= 2021–22 SSC Napoli season =

Napoli
2021–22 season
- President: Aurelio De Laurentiis
- Head coach: Luciano Spalletti
- Stadium: Stadio Diego Armando Maradona
- Serie A: 3rd
- Coppa Italia: Round of 16
- UEFA Europa League: Knockout round play-offs
- Top goalscorer: League: Victor Osimhen (14); All: Victor Osimhen (18)
| colours | Away colours | Third colours |

The 2021–22 season was the 96th season in the existence of SSC Napoli and the club's 15th consecutive season in the top flight of Italian football. In addition to the domestic league, Napoli participated in this season's editions of the Coppa Italia and the UEFA Europa League.

== Kits ==
Supplier: (Italy) EA7
Sponsor(s): (Italy) Acqua Lete, (Italy) MSC Cruises (only for domestic matches), (United States) Amazon (left sleeve)

| Home | Away | Third | Fourth | Home (Europe) | Third (Europe) | Fourth (Europe) | Halloween | Maradona (Navy) | Maradona (White) | Maradona (Blue) | Maradona (Red) |

== Players ==
=== First-team squad ===
As of 2 January 2022

Note: Flags indicate national team as defined under FIFA eligibility rules; some limited exceptions apply. Players may hold more than one non-FIFA nationality.

| No. | Pos. | Nation | Player |
|---|---|---|---|
| 1 | GK | ITA | Alex Meret |
| 2 | DF | FRA | Kévin Malcuit |
| 3 | DF | ENG | Axel Tuanzebe (on loan from Manchester United) |
| 4 | MF | GER | Diego Demme |
| 5 | DF | BRA | Juan Jesus |
| 6 | DF | POR | Mário Rui |
| 7 | MF | MKD | Eljif Elmas |
| 8 | MF | ESP | Fabián Ruiz |
| 9 | FW | NGR | Victor Osimhen |
| 11 | FW | MEX | Hirving Lozano |
| 12 | GK | ITA | Davide Marfella |
| 13 | DF | KOS | Amir Rrahmani |
| 14 | FW | BEL | Dries Mertens (3rd captain) |

| No. | Pos. | Nation | Player |
|---|---|---|---|
| 20 | MF | POL | Piotr Zieliński (4th captain) |
| 21 | FW | ITA | Matteo Politano |
| 22 | DF | ITA | Giovanni Di Lorenzo |
| 24 | FW | ITA | Lorenzo Insigne (captain) |
| 25 | GK | COL | David Ospina |
| 26 | DF | SEN | Kalidou Koulibaly (vice-captain) |
| 31 | DF | ALG | Faouzi Ghoulam |
| 33 | FW | ALG | Adam Ounas |
| 37 | FW | ITA | Andrea Petagna |
| 59 | DF | ITA | Alessandro Zanoli |
| 68 | MF | SVK | Stanislav Lobotka |
| 99 | MF | CMR | André-Frank Zambo Anguissa (on loan from Fulham) |

=== Out on loan ===
As of 18 January 2022

Note: Flags indicate national team as defined under FIFA eligibility rules; some limited exceptions apply. Players may hold more than one non-FIFA nationality.

| No. | Pos. | Nation | Player |
|---|---|---|---|
| — | GK | ITA | Nikita Contini (at Crotone until 30 June 2022) |
| — | DF | ITA | Sebastiano Luperto (at Empoli until 30 June 2023) |
| — | DF | ITA | Francesco Mezzoni (at Pistoiese until 30 June 2022) |
| — | MF | ITA | Gianluca Gaetano (at Cremonese until 30 June 2022) |
| — | MF | ITA | Luca Palmiero (at Cosenza until 30 June 2022) |
| — | MF | FRA | Zinédine Machach (at Honvéd until 30 June 2022) |
| — | MF | ITA | Francesco Marrazzo (at Lanusei until 30 June 2022) |
| — | MF | ITA | Filippo Costa (at Parma until 30 June 2022) |

| No. | Pos. | Nation | Player |
|---|---|---|---|
| — | MF | FRA | Karim Zedadka (at Charleroi until 30 June 2022) |
| — | FW | ITA | Leonardo Candellone (at Südtirol until 30 June 2022) |
| — | FW | ITA | Eugenio D'Ursi (at Pescara until 30 June 2022) |
| — | FW | ARG | Franco Ferrari (at Pescara until 30 June 2022) |
| — | FW | ITA | Michael Folorunsho (at Pordenone until 30 June 2022) |
| — | FW | ITA | Gennaro Tutino (at Parma until 30 June 2022) |
| — | FW | ITA | Alessio Zerbin (at Frosinone until 30 June 2022) |

== Transfers ==
=== In ===
| Date | Pos. | Player | Age | Moving from | Fee | Notes | Source |
|---|---|---|---|---|---|---|---|
| 30 June 2021 | FW | (Italy) Matteo Politano | 27 | (Italy) Internazionale | €25M | Loan deal made permanent | |
| 30 June 2021 | DF | (France) Kévin Malcuit | 29 | (Italy) Fiorentina | N/A | Loan return | |
| 30 June 2021 | FW | (Algeria) Adam Ounas | 24 | (Italy) Crotone | N/A | Loan return | |
| 30 June 2021 | DF | (Italy) Alessandro Zanoli | 20 | (Italy) Legnago | N/A | Loan return | |
| 18 August 2021 | DF | (Brazil) Juan Jesus | 30 | (Italy) Roma | Free | End of contract | |
| 18 January 2022 | MF | (Germany) Amin Younes | 28 | (Germany) Eintracht Frankfurt | N/A | Loan terminated early | |

==== Loans in ====
| Date | Pos. | Player | Age | Moving from | Fee | Notes | Source |
|---|---|---|---|---|---|---|---|
| 31 August 2021 | MF | (Cameroon) André-Frank Zambo Anguissa | 25 | (England) Fulham | N/A | One year loan with option to buy | |
| 8 January 2022 | DF | (England) Axel Tuanzebe | 24 | (England) Manchester United | N/A | Six month loan | |

=== Out ===
| Date | Pos. | Player | Age | Moving to | Fee | Notes | Source |
|---|---|---|---|---|---|---|---|
| 30 June 2021 | MF | (France) Tiémoué Bakayoko | 26 | (England) Chelsea | N/A | End of loan | |
| 30 June 2021 | DF | (Albania) Elseid Hysaj | 27 | (Italy) Lazio | Free | End of contract | |
| 30 June 2021 | DF | (Serbia) Nikola Maksimović | 29 | (Italy) Genoa | Free | End of contract | |
| 1 January 2022 | DF | (Greece) Kostas Manolas | 30 | (Greece) Olympiacos | €2.5M | | |
| 23 January 2022 | MF | (Germany) Amin Younes | 28 | (Saudi Arabia) Al-Ettifaq | Free | | |

==== Loans out ====
| Date | Pos. | Player | Age | Moving to | Fee | Notes | Source |
|---|---|---|---|---|---|---|---|
| 31 August 2021 | MF | (Italy) Gianluca Gaetano | 21 | (Italy) Cremonese | N/A | One year loan | |

== Pre-season and friendlies ==
Win Draw Loss Fixtures

| 18 July 2021 Friendly | Napoli (Italy) | 12–0 | (Italy) Anaunia | Trento, Italy |
| 17:30 CEST (UTC+2) | Elmas 3'; Osimhen 8', 19', 35', 37'; Manolas 15'; Lobotka 44'; Tutino 60'; Palmiero 62'; Ciciretti 64'; Machach 78'; Petagna 90' | Report | | Stadium: Campo sportivo Dimaro |

| 24 July 2021 Friendly | Napoli (Italy) | 1–0 | (Italy) Pro Vercelli | Trento, Italy |
| 17:30 CEST (UTC+2) | Osimhen 26' | Report | | Stadium: Campo sportivo Dimaro |

| 31 July 2021 2021 Audi Cup | Bayern Munich (Germany) | 0–3 | (Italy) Napoli | Munich, Germany |
| 16:30 CEST (UTC+2) | Richards (yellow card) 78' | Report | Osimhen 69', 71'; Machach 85' | Stadium: Allianz Arena; Attendance: 10,000; Referee: Felix Brych |

| 4 August 2021 Friendly | Wisła Kraków (Poland) | 1–2 | (Italy) Napoli | Kraków, Poland |
| 18:00 CEST (UTC+2) | Brown Forbes 6' | Report | Politano 67'; Machach 85' | Stadium: Stadion Miejski Wisły; Attendance: 16 614; Referee: Mariusz Złotek |

| 8 August 2021 Friendly | Napoli (Italy) | 2–1 | (Italy) Ascoli | Castel di Sangro, Italy |
| 17:30 CEST (UTC+2) | Insigne 7'; Elmas 62' | Report | Bidaoui 25' | Stadium: Stadio Teofilo Patini; Referee: Federico Dionisi |

| 14 August 2021 Friendly | Napoli (Italy) | 4–0 | (Italy) Pescara | Castel di Sangro, Italy |
| 17:30 CEST (UTC+2) | Osimhen 9'; Insigne 18'; Ounas 48'; Zedadka 79' | Report | | Stadium: Stadio Teofilo Patini; Referee: Davide Miele |

| 6 September 2021 Friendly | Napoli (Italy) | 1–5 | (Italy) Benevento | Naples, Italy |
| 21:00 CEST (UTC+2) | Politano 63' (pen.) | Report | Calò 23'; Improta 34', (yellow card) 44'; Basit (yellow card) 54'; Vokić (yellow card) 60'; Foulon 67'; Tello (yellow card) 79'; Insigne 85' (pen.); Umile 89' | Stadium: Stadio San Paolo; Referee: Davide Miele |

== Competitions ==
=== Overall record ===
| Competition | First match | Last match | Starting round | Final position | Record | | | | | | | |
| Competition | First match | Last match | Starting round | Final position | Pld | W | D | L | GF | GA | GD | Win % |
|---|---|---|---|---|---|---|---|---|---|---|---|---|
| Serie A | 22 August 2021 | 22 May 2022 | Matchday 1 | 3rd | 38 | 24 | 7 | 7 | 74 | 31 | +43 | 63.16 |
| Coppa Italia | 13 January 2022 | | Round of 16 | Round of 16 | 1 | 0 | 0 | 1 | 2 | 5 | −3 | 0.00 |
| UEFA Europa League | 16 September 2021 | 24 February 2022 | Group stage | Knockout round play-offs | 8 | 3 | 2 | 3 | 18 | 15 | +3 | 37.50 |
| Total | | | | | 47 | 27 | 9 | 11 | 94 | 51 | +43 | 57.45 |

Source: Soccerway

=== Serie A ===
==== League table ====
| Pos | Team | Pld | W | D | L | GF | GA | GD | Pts | Qualification or relegation |
|---|---|---|---|---|---|---|---|---|---|---|
| 1 | Milan (C) | 38 | 26 | 8 | 4 | 69 | 31 | +38 | 86 | Qualification for the Champions League group stage |
| 2 | Inter Milan | 38 | 25 | 9 | 4 | 84 | 32 | +52 | 84 | Qualification for the Champions League group stage |
| 3 | Napoli | 38 | 24 | 7 | 7 | 74 | 31 | +43 | 79 | Qualification for the Champions League group stage |
| 4 | Juventus | 38 | 20 | 10 | 8 | 57 | 37 | +20 | 70 | Qualification for the Champions League group stage |
| 5 | Lazio | 38 | 18 | 10 | 10 | 77 | 58 | +19 | 64 | Qualification for the Europa League group stage (Note: Since the winners of the 2021–22 Coppa Italia, Inter Milan, qualified for the Champions League, the Europa League berth awarded to the Coppa Italia winners was passed to the sixth-placed team, and the Europa Conference League berth awarded to the sixth-placed team was passed to the seventh-placed team.) |

Source: Serie A
Rules for classification: 1) Points; 2) Head-to-head points; 3) Head-to-head goal difference; 4) Goal difference; 5) Goals scored; 6) Draw. (Note: Head-to-head record is used only after all the matches between the teams in question have been played)
(C) Champions

==== Results summary ====
| Overall | | | | | | | | Home | | | | | | Away | | | | | |
| Pld | W | D | L | GF | GA | GD | Pts | W | D | L | GF | GA | GD | W | D | L | GF | GA | GD |
|---|---|---|---|---|---|---|---|---|---|---|---|---|---|---|---|---|---|---|---|
| 38 | 24 | 7 | 7 | 74 | 31 | +43 | 79 | 11 | 3 | 5 | 37 | 16 | +21 | 13 | 4 | 2 | 37 | 15 | +22 |

Source: Serie A

==== Results by round ====
| Round | 1 | 2 | 3 | 4 | 5 | 6 | 7 | 8 | 9 | 10 | 11 | 12 | 13 | 14 | 15 | 16 | 17 | 18 | 19 | 20 | 21 | 22 | 23 | 24 | 25 | 26 | 27 | 28 | 29 | 30 | 31 | 32 | 33 | 34 | 35 | 36 | 37 | 38 |
|---|---|---|---|---|---|---|---|---|---|---|---|---|---|---|---|---|---|---|---|---|---|---|---|---|---|---|---|---|---|---|---|---|---|---|---|---|---|---|
| Ground | H | A | H | A | A | H | A | H | A | H | A | H | A | H | A | H | H | A | H | A | H | A | H | A | H | A | A | H | A | H | A | H | H | A | H | A | H | A |
| Result | W | W | W | W | W | W | W | W | D | W | W | D | L | W | D | L | L | W | L | D | W | W | W | W | D | D | W | L | W | W | W | L | D | L | W | W | W | W |
| Position | 4 | 5 | 3 | 1 | 1 | 1 | 1 | 1 | 1 | 1 | 1 | 1 | 1 | 1 | 1 | 3 | 4 | 2 | 3 | 3 | 3 | 3 | 2 | 2 | 3 | 3 | 1 | 3 | 2 | 2 | 2 | 3 | 3 | 3 | 3 | 3 | 3 | 3 |

Source: Serie A
A = Away; H = Home; W = Win; D = Draw; L = Loss

==== Matches ====
The league fixtures were announced on 14 July 2021.

| 22 August 2021 1 | Napoli | 2–0 | Venezia | Naples |
| 20:45 CEST (UTC+2) | Osimhen (red card) 23'; Fabián (yellow card) 52'; Insigne (penalty missed) 56', 62' (pen.); Elmas 73' | Report | Fiordilino (yellow card) 12'; Caldara (yellow card) 30'; Heymans (yellow card) 38'; Ebuehi (yellow card) 45+1'; Forte (yellow card) 50'; Ceccaroni (yellow card) 61'; Tessmann (yellow card) 75' | Stadium: Stadio San Paolo; Attendance: 18,299; Referee: Gianluca Aureliano |

| 29 August 2021 2 | Genoa | 1–2 | Napoli | Genoa |
| 18:30 CEST (UTC+2) | Ekuban (yellow card) 11'; Criscito (yellow card) 51'; Cambiaso 69' | Report | Fabián 39'; Di Lorenzo (yellow card) 45'; Politano (yellow card) 49'; Petagna 84'; Mário Rui (yellow card) 90' | Stadium: Stadio Luigi Ferraris; Attendance: 6,000; Referee: Marco Di Bello |

| 11 September 2021 3 | Napoli | 2–1 | Juventus | Naples |
| 18:00 CEST (UTC+2) | Elmas (yellow card) 31'; Politano 57'; Koulibaly 85'; Lozano (yellow card) 88' | Report | Morata 10'; Locatelli (yellow card) 45' | Stadium: Stadio San Paolo; Attendance: 16,331; Referee: Massimiliano Irrati |

| 20 September 2021 4 | Udinese | 0–4 | Napoli | Udine |
| 20:45 CEST (UTC+2) | Samir (yellow card) 56'; Molina (yellow card) 66' | Report | Osimhen 24'; Rrahmani 35'; Koulibaly 52'; Mário Rui (yellow card) 82'; Lozano 84' | Stadium: Stadio Friuli; Attendance: 11,484; Referee: Gianluca Manganiello |

| 23 September 2021 5 | Sampdoria | 0–4 | Napoli | Genoa |
| 18:30 CEST (UTC+2) | Damsgaard (yellow card) 28'; Depaoli (yellow card) 76' | Report | Osimhen 10', 50'; Fabián 39'; Zieliński 59'; Manolas (yellow card) 87' | Stadium: Stadio Luigi Ferraris; Attendance: 4,596; Referee: Paolo Valeri |

| 26 September 2021 6 | Napoli | 2–0 | Cagliari | Naples |
| 20:45 CEST (UTC+2) | Osimhen 11', (yellow card) 66'; Insigne 57' (pen.); Elmas (yellow card) 76' | Report | Walukiewicz (yellow card) 60' | Stadium: Stadio San Paolo; Attendance: 17,723; Referee: Marco Piccinini |

| 3 October 2021 7 | Fiorentina | 1–2 | Napoli | Florence |
| 18:00 CEST (UTC+2) | Martínez Quarta 28', (yellow card) 36'; Bonaventura (yellow card) 31'; Pulgar (yellow card) 53' | Report | Insigne (penalty missed) 39'; Lozano 39'; Rrahmani 50'; Zambo Anguissa (yellow card) 54'; Mário Rui (yellow card) 68'; Demme (yellow card) 90+1' | Stadium: Stadio Artemio Franchi; Attendance: 15,264; Referee: Simone Sozza |

| 17 October 2021 8 | Napoli | 1–0 | Torino | Naples |
| 18:00 CEST (UTC+2) | Insigne (penalty missed) 27'; Koulibaly (yellow card) 79'; Osimhen 81'; Zambo Anguissa (yellow card) 85' | Report | Rodriguez (yellow card) 37'; Linetty (yellow card) 56'; Pobega (yellow card) 75'; Milinković-Savić (yellow card) 90+7' | Stadium: Stadio San Paolo; Attendance: 27,579; Referee: Juan Luca Sacchi |

| 24 October 2021 9 | Roma | 0–0 | Napoli | Rome |
| 18:00 CEST (UTC+2) | Abraham (yellow card) 30'; Karsdorp (yellow card) 90+4'; Veretout (yellow card) 90+4'; Mancini (yellow card) 90+5' | Report | Mertens (yellow card) 90+5' | Stadium: Stadio Olimpico; Attendance: 47,801; Referee: Davide Massa |

| 28 October 2021 10 | Napoli | 3–0 | Bologna | Naples |
| 20:45 CEST (UTC+2) | Fabián 18'; Zambo Anguissa (yellow card) 32'; Insigne 41' (pen.), 62' (pen.) | Report | Medel (yellow card) 40' | Stadium: Stadio San Paolo; Attendance: 19,000; Referee: Marco Serra |

| 31 October 2021 11 | Salernitana | 0–1 | Napoli | Salerno |
| 18:00 CET (UTC+1) | Kastanos (red card) 70' | Report | Zambo Anguissa (yellow card) 41'; Zieliński 61'; Mário Rui (yellow card) 74'; Koulibaly (red card) 77' | Stadium: Stadio Arechi; Attendance: 17,043; Referee: Michael Fabbri |

| 7 November 2021 12 | Napoli | 1–1 | Hellas Verona | Naples |
| 18:00 CET (UTC+1) | Di Lorenzo 18'; Rrahmani (yellow card) 31'; Osimhen (yellow card) 87' | Report | Simeone 13'; Barák (yellow card) 41'; Veloso (yellow card) 59'; Dawidowicz (yellow card) 68'; Bessa (yellow card) 80' (yellow-red card) 88'; Kalinić (yellow card) 85' (yellow-red card) 90+3' | Stadium: Stadio San Paolo; Attendance: 28,000; Referee: Giovanni Ayroldi |

| 21 November 2021 13 | Internazionale | 3–2 | Napoli | Milan |
| 18:00 CET (UTC+1) | Çalhanoğlu 25' (pen.), (yellow card) 41'; Perišić 44'; Martínez 61'; Vidal (yellow card) 72'; Handanović (yellow card) 84'; Džeko (yellow card) 90+3' | Report | Osimhen (yellow card) 10'; Zieliński 17'; Koulibaly (yellow card) 24'; Rrahmani (yellow card) 35'; Mertens 79' | Stadium: San Siro; Attendance: 56,649; Referee: Paolo Valeri |

| 28 November 2021 14 | Napoli | 4–0 | Lazio | Naples |
| 20:45 CET (UTC+1) | Zieliński 7'; Mertens 10', 29'; Di Lorenzo (yellow card) 78'; Fabián 85'; Demme (yellow card) 88' | Report | Luiz Felipe (yellow card) 13'; Patric (yellow card) 35'; Cataldi (yellow card) 59'; Zaccagni (yellow card) 79' | Stadium: Stadio San Paolo; Attendance: 36,000; Referee: Daniele Orsato |

| 1 December 2021 15 | Sassuolo | 2–2 | Napoli | Reggio Emilia |
| 20:45 CET (UTC+1) | Rogério (yellow card) 25'; Berardi (yellow card) 54'; Scamacca 71'; Matheus Henrique (yellow card) 87'; Ferrari 89'; Defrel (yellow card) 90+4' | Report | Fabián 51'; Mertens 59'; Politano (yellow card) 84'; Demme (yellow card) 88' | Stadium: Mapei Stadium – Città del Tricolore; Attendance: 8,192; Referee: Ivano Pezzuto |

| 4 December 2021 16 | Napoli | 2–3 | Atalanta | Naples |
| 20:45 CET (UTC+1) | Zieliński 40'; Mertens 47'; Rrahmani (yellow card) 58'; Malcuit (yellow card) 64' | Report | Malinovskyi 7', (yellow card) 17'; Demiral 66'; Freuler 71'; Pašalić (yellow card) 82'; Djimsiti (yellow card) 87' | Stadium: Stadio Diego Armando Maradona; Attendance: 30,000; Referee: Maurizio Mariani |

| 12 December 2021 17 | Napoli | 0–1 | Empoli | Naples |
| 18:00 CET (UTC+1) | | Report | Żurkowski (yellow card) 60'; Cutrone 70' | Stadium: Stadio Diego Armando Maradona; Attendance: 24,000; Referee: Livio Marinelli |

| 19 December 2021 18 | Milan | 0–1 | Napoli | Milan |
| 20:45 CET (UTC+1) | | Report | Elmas 5'; Di Lorenzo (yellow card) 33'; Malcuit (yellow card) 67' | Stadium: San Siro; Attendance: 54,647; Referee: Davide Massa |

| 22 December 2021 19 | Napoli | 0–1 | Spezia | Naples |
| 20:45 CET (UTC+1) | Mário Rui (yellow card) 45+1'; Petagna (yellow card) 75' | Report | Maggiore (yellow card) 19'; Juan Jesus 37' (o.g.); Kiwior (yellow card) 48'; Manaj (yellow card) 51' | Stadium: Stadio Diego Armando Maradona; Attendance: 25,000; Referee: Luca Massimi |

| 6 January 2022 20 | Juventus | 1–1 | Napoli | Turin |
| 20:45 CET (UTC+1) | Alex Sandro (yellow card) 44'; Chiesa 54'; Dybala (yellow card) 90+7' | Report | Mertens 23'; Demme (yellow card) 87' | Stadium: Juventus Stadium; Attendance: 19,301; Referee: Simone Sozza |

| 9 January 2022 21 | Napoli | 1–0 | Sampdoria | Naples |
| 16:30 CET (UTC+1) | Petagna 43' | Report | Chabot (yellow card) 45+1'; Murru (yellow card) 90+1' | Stadium: Stadio Diego Armando Maradona; Attendance: 9,000; Referee: Marco Di Bello |

| 17 January 2022 22 | Bologna | 0–2 | Napoli | Bologna |
| 18:30 CET (UTC+1) | Soumaoro (yellow card) 43'; Theate (yellow card) 57'; Binks (yellow card) 90+4' | Report | Lozano 20', 47'; Zieliński (yellow card) 52' | Stadium: Stadio Renato Dall'Ara; Attendance: 5,000; Referee: Livio Marinelli |

| 23 January 2022 23 | Napoli | 4–1 | Salernitana | Naples |
| 15:00 CET (UTC+1) | Juan Jesus 17'; Mertens 45+4' (pen.); Rrahmani 47'; Insigne 53' (pen.) | Report | Delli Carri (yellow card) 23'; Obi (yellow card) 30'; Bonazzoli 33'; Veseli (yellow card) 45+3' (yellow-red card) 51' | Stadium: Stadio Diego Armando Maradona; Attendance: 3,000; Referee: Luca Pairetto |

| 6 February 2022 24 | Venezia | 0–2 | Napoli | Venice |
| 15:00 CET (UTC+1) | Busio (yellow card) 76'; Ceccaroni (yellow card) 88'; Ebuehi (red card) 90+5' | Report | Osimhen 59'; Mário Rui (yellow card) 74'; Lobotka (yellow card) 83'; Petagna 90+10' | Stadium: Stadio Pier Luigi Penzo; Attendance: 5,554; Referee: Maurizio Mariani |

| 12 February 2022 25 | Napoli | 1–1 | Internazionale | Naples |
| 18:00 CET (UTC+1) | Insigne 7' (pen.), (yellow card) 38' | Report | Džeko 47'; Brozović (yellow card) 60' | Stadium: Stadio Diego Armando Maradona; Attendance: 27,000; Referee: Daniele Doveri |

| 21 February 2022 26 | Cagliari | 1–1 | Napoli | Cagliari |
| 19:00 CET (UTC+1) | João Pedro (yellow card) 35'; Pereiro 58' | Report | Malcuit (yellow card) 42'; Koulibaly (yellow card) 64'; Osimhen 87' | Stadium: Unipol Domus; Attendance: 12,063; Referee: Simone Sozza |

| 27 February 2022 27 | Lazio | 1–2 | Napoli | Rome |
| 20:50 CET (UTC+1) | Radu (yellow card) 71'; Immobile (yellow card) 79'; Zaccagni (yellow card) 82'; Pedro 88' | Report | Insigne 62'; Mário Rui (yellow card) 90+3'; Fabián 90+4', (yellow card) 90+7' | Stadium: Stadio Olimpico; Attendance: 25,000; Referee: Marco Di Bello |

| 6 March 2022 28 | Napoli | 0–1 | Milan | Naples |
| 20:45 CET (UTC+1) | Koulibaly (yellow card) 24'; Rrahmani (yellow card) 37'; Osimhen (yellow card) 77'; Ounas (yellow card) 90+2' | Report | Giroud (yellow card) 39', (goal) 49'; Hernandez (yellow card) 77'; Maignan (yellow card) 83'; Florenzi (yellow card) 90+3' | Stadium: Stadio Diego Armando Maradona; Attendance: 42,000; Referee: Daniele Orsato |

| 13 March 2022 29 | Hellas Verona | 1–2 | Napoli | Verona |
| 15:00 CET (UTC+1) | Günter (yellow card) 69'; Ceccherini (yellow card) 70' (yellow-red card) 83'; Faraoni 77', (yellow card) 90+7' (yellow-red card) 90+8'; Ilić (yellow card) 86' | Report | Osimhen 14', 71' | Stadium: Stadio Marcantonio Bentegodi; Attendance: 18,782; Referee: Daniele Doveri |

| 19 March 2022 30 | Napoli | 2–1 | Udinese | Naples |
| 15:00 CET (UTC+1) | Osimhen 52', 63', (yellow card) 90+2'; Rrahmani (yellow card) 65' | Report | Deulofeu 22'; Zeegelaar (yellow card) 45+2'; Udogie (yellow card) 50'; Marí (red card) 83' | Stadium: Stadio Diego Armando Maradona; Attendance: 37,363; Referee: Francesco Fourneau |

| 3 April 2022 31 | Atalanta | 1–3 | Napoli | Bergamo |
| 15:00 CEST (UTC+2) | Palomino (yellow card) 35'; De Roon 58', (yellow card) 86' | Report | Insigne 14' (pen.); Politano 37'; Juan Jesus (yellow card) 67'; Ospina (yellow card) 76'; Elmas 81'; Zambo Anguissa (yellow card) 85' | Stadium: Gewiss Stadium; Attendance: 17,709; Referee: Marco Di Bello |

| 10 April 2022 32 | Napoli | 2–3 | Fiorentina | Naples |
| 15:00 CEST (UTC+2) | Mertens 58'; Osimhen 84' | Report | Milenković (yellow card) 11'; González 29'; Ikoné 66', (yellow card) 88'; Cabral 72', (yellow card) 73' | Stadium: Stadio Diego Armando Maradona; Attendance: 50,000; Referee: Maurizio Mariani |

| 18 April 2022 33 | Napoli | 1–1 | Roma | Naples |
| 19:00 CEST (UTC+2) | Insigne 11' (pen.), (yellow card) 64'; Koulibaly (yellow card) 37'; Zanoli (yellow card) 52'; Lozano (yellow card) 62' | Report | Cristante (yellow card) 17'; Zaniolo (yellow card) 71'; Fuzato (red card) 80'; El Shaarawy 90+1' | Stadium: Stadio Diego Armando Maradona; Attendance: 41,822; Referee: Marco Di Bello |

| 24 April 2022 34 | Empoli | 3–2 | Napoli | Empoli |
| 15:00 CEST (UTC+2) | Bandinelli (yellow card) 4'; Viti (yellow card) 72'; Henderson 80'; Stojanović (yellow card) 81'; Pinamonti 83', 88', (yellow card) 89' | Report | Zanoli (yellow card) 22'; Mertens 44'; Insigne 53' | Stadium: Stadio Carlo Castellani; Attendance: 10,245; Referee: Livio Marinelli |

| 30 April 2022 35 | Napoli | 6–1 | Sassuolo | Naples |
| 15:00 CEST (UTC+2) | Koulibaly 7'; Osimhen 15'; Lozano 19'; Mertens 21', 54'; Rrahmani 80' | Report | Lopez (yellow card) 18', (goal) 87'; Frattesi (yellow card) 53'; Berardi (yellow card) 84' | Stadium: Stadio Diego Armando Maradona; Attendance: 20,000; Referee: Antonio Rapuano |

| 7 May 2022 36 | Torino | 0–1 | Napoli | Turin |
| 15:00 CEST (UTC+2) | Vojvoda (yellow card) 55'; Singo (yellow card) 79' | Report | Mertens (yellow card) 53'; Lozano (yellow card) 56'; Insigne (penalty missed) 61'; Fabián 73'; Elmas (yellow card) 90+6' | Stadium: Stadio Olimpico Grande Torino; Attendance: 14,619; Referee: Alessandro Prontera |

| 15 May 2022 37 | Napoli | 3–0 | Genoa | Naples |
| 15:00 CEST (UTC+2) | Osimhen 32'; Insigne 65' (pen.); Lobotka 81', (yellow card) 87' | Report | Galdames (yellow card) 38' | Stadium: Stadio Diego Armando Maradona; Attendance: 50,871; Referee: Michael Fabbri |

| 22 May 2022 38 | Spezia | 0–3 | Napoli | La Spezia |
| 12:30 CEST (UTC+2) | Manaj (yellow card) 45+10' | Report | Politano 4', (yellow card) 51'; Zieliński 25'; Demme 36'; Ghoulam (yellow card) 66' | Stadium: Stadio Alberto Picco; Attendance: 10,415; Referee: Matteo Marchetti |

=== Coppa Italia ===
| 13 January 2022 Round of 16 | Napoli | 2–5 (a.e.t.) | Fiorentina | Naples |
| 18:00 CET (UTC+1) | Mertens 44'; Rrahmani (yellow card) 56'; Fabián (yellow card) 77' (yellow-red card) 90+3'; Lozano (red card) 84'; Tuanzebe (yellow card) 85'; Petagna 90+5' | Report | Duncan (yellow card) 23'; Vlahović 41'; Drągowski (red card) 45+2'; Biraghi 57'; Castrovilli (yellow card) 59'; Venuti 105+1'; Piątek 108'; Maleh 119' | Stadium: Stadio Diego Armando Maradona; Attendance: 4,500; Referee: Giovanni Ayroldi |

=== UEFA Europa League ===
==== Group stage ====
The draw for the group stage was held on 27 August 2021.

| Pos | Team | Pld | W | D | L | GF | GA | GD | Pts | Qualification | SPM | NAP | LEI | LEG |
|---|---|---|---|---|---|---|---|---|---|---|---|---|---|---|
| 1 | (Russia) Spartak Moscow | 6 | 3 | 1 | 2 | 10 | 9 | +1 | 10 (Note: Head–to–head points: Spartak Moscow 6, Napoli 0.) | Advance to round of 16 | — | 2–1 | 3–4 | 0–1 |
| 2 | (Italy) Napoli | 6 | 3 | 1 | 2 | 15 | 10 | +5 | 10 | Advance to knockout round play-offs | 2–3 | — | 3–2 | 3–0 |
| 3 | (England) Leicester City | 6 | 2 | 2 | 2 | 12 | 11 | +1 | 8 | Transfer to Europa Conference League | 1–1 | 2–2 | — | 3–1 |
| 4 | (Poland) Legia Warsaw | 6 | 2 | 0 | 4 | 4 | 11 | −7 | 6 | | 0–1 | 1–4 | 1–0 | — |

Source: UEFA
Rules for classification: Group stage tiebreakers
Notes:

| 16 September 2021 1 | Leicester City (England) | 2–2 | (Italy) Napoli | Leicester, England |
| 21:00 CET (UTC+1) | Pérez 9'; Ndidi (yellow card) 21' (yellow-red card) 90+3'; Soumaré (yellow card) 32'; Vestergaard (yellow card) 53'; Barnes 64'; Söyüncü (yellow card) 76' | Report | Di Lorenzo (yellow card) 34'; Osimhen 69', 87'; Rrahmani (yellow card) 90+5' | Stadium: King Power Stadium; Attendance: 29,579; Referee: Tiago Martins (Portugal) |

| 30 September 2021 2 | Napoli (Italy) | 2–3 | (Russia) Spartak Moscow | Naples, Italy |
| 18:45 CEST (UTC+2) | Elmas 1'; Mário Rui (red card) 29'; Di Lorenzo (yellow card) 45+8'; Koulibaly (yellow card) 65'; Fabián (yellow card) 78'; Manolas (yellow card) 85'; Osimhen 90+4' | Report | Ponce (yellow card) 43'; Litvinov (yellow card) 45+1'; Sobolev (yellow card) 45+8'; Promes 55', 90'; Caufriez (yellow card) 65' (yellow-red card) 82'; Ayrton (yellow card) 77'; Ignatov 81'; Maksimenko (yellow card) 89'; Umyarov (yellow card) 90+10' | Stadium: Stadio Diego Armando Maradona; Attendance: 13,373; Referee: Ivan Kružliak (Slovakia) |

| 21 October 2021 3 | Napoli (Italy) | 3–0 | (Poland) Legia Warsaw | Naples, Italy |
| 21:00 CEST (UTC+2) | Juan Jesus (yellow card) 13'; Manolas (yellow card) 44'; Insigne 76'; Osimhen 80'; Politano 90+5' | Report | Johansson (yellow card) 73' | Stadium: Stadio Diego Armando Maradona; Attendance: 10,346; Referee: Carlos del Cerro Grande (Spain) |

| 4 November 2021 4 | Legia Warsaw (Poland) | 1–4 | (Italy) Napoli | Warsaw, Poland |
| 18:45 CET (UTC+1) | Emreli 10'; Jędrzejczyk (yellow card) 68'; Miszta (yellow card) 73'; Josué (yellow card) 75' | Report | Zieliński 51' (pen.); Elmas (yellow card) 54'; Mertens 75' (pen.); Lozano 79'; Ounas 90' | Stadium: Stadion Wojska Polskiego; Attendance: 25,706; Referee: Lawrence Visser (Belgium) |

| 24 November 2021 5 | Spartak Moscow (Russia) | 2–1 | (Italy) Napoli | Moscow, Russia |
| 18:30 MSK (UTC+3) | Sobolev 3' (pen.), 28', (yellow card) 88'; Litvinov (yellow card) 14'; Promes (yellow card) 90+2' | Report | Elmas 64'; Koulibaly (yellow card) 78' | Stadium: Otkritie Arena; Attendance: 10,852; Referee: Clément Turpin (France) |

| 9 December 2021 6 | Napoli (Italy) | 3–2 | (England) Leicester City | Naples, Italy |
| 18:45 CET (UTC+1) | Ounas 4'; Elmas 24', 53'; Petagna (yellow card) 33'; Demme (yellow card) 77' | Report | Evans 27'; Dewsbury-Hall 33' | Stadium: Stadio Diego Armando Maradona; Attendance: 14,646; Referee: Antonio Mateu Lahoz (Spain) |

==== Knockout phase ====
===== Knockout round play-offs =====
The knockout round play-offs draw was held on 13 December 2021.

| 17 February 2022 First leg | Barcelona (Spain) | 1–1 | (Italy) Napoli | Barcelona, Spain |
| 18:45 CET (UTC+1) | Torres 59' (pen.) | Report | Zieliński 29'; Zambo Anguissa (yellow card) 39'; Fabián (yellow card) 70'; Mário Rui (yellow card) 90'; Meret (yellow card) 90+1' | Stadium: Camp Nou; Attendance: 73,525; Referee: István Kovács (Romania) |

| 24 February 2022 Second leg | Napoli (Italy) | 2–4 (3–5 agg.) | (Spain) Barcelona | Naples, Italy |
| 21:00 CET (UTC+1) | Insigne 23' (pen.); Zieliński (yellow card) 56'; Fabián (yellow card) 62'; Politano 87' | Report | Alba 8'; F. de Jong 13'; Piqué 45'; Aubameyang 59'; Gavi (yellow card) 90+3' | Stadium: Stadio Diego Armando Maradona; Attendance: 37,858; Referee: Sergei Karasev (Russia) |

== Statistics ==
=== Appearances and goals ===
Last updated on 22 May 2022

| No. | Pos | Nat | Player | Total | | Serie A | | Coppa Italia | | Europa League | |
| No. | Pos | Nat | Player | Apps | Goals | Apps | Goals | Apps | Goals | Apps | Goals |
Goalkeepers
| 1 | GK | (Italy) ITA | Alex Meret | 15 | 0 | 7 | 0 | 0+1 | 0 | 7 | 0 |
| 12 | GK | (Italy) ITA | Davide Marfella | 1 | 0 | 0+1 | 0 | 0 | 0 | 0 | 0 |
| 25 | GK | (Colombia) COL | David Ospina | 33 | 0 | 31 | 0 | 1 | 0 | 1 | 0 |
| 46 | GK | (Poland) POL | Hubert Idasiak | 0 | 0 | 0 | 0 | 0 | 0 | 0 | 0 |
Defenders
| 2 | DF | (France) FRA | Kévin Malcuit | 13 | 0 | 2+6 | 0 | 0+1 | 0 | 1+3 | 0 |
| 3 | DF | (England) ENG | Axel Tuanzebe | 2 | 0 | 0+1 | 0 | 1 | 0 | 0 | 0 |
| 5 | DF | (Brazil) BRA | Juan Jesus | 28 | 1 | 14+7 | 1 | 0+1 | 0 | 5+1 | 0 |
| 6 | DF | (Portugal) POR | Mário Rui | 39 | 0 | 34 | 0 | 0 | 0 | 4+1 | 0 |
| 13 | DF | (Kosovo) KOS | Amir Rrahmani | 41 | 4 | 33 | 4 | 1 | 0 | 5+2 | 0 |
| 22 | DF | (Italy) ITA | Giovanni Di Lorenzo | 42 | 1 | 33 | 1 | 1 | 0 | 8 | 0 |
| 26 | DF | (Senegal) SEN | Kalidou Koulibaly | 34 | 3 | 27 | 3 | 0 | 0 | 7 | 0 |
| 31 | DF | (Algeria) ALG | Faouzi Ghoulam | 16 | 0 | 3+11 | 0 | 1 | 0 | 0+1 | 0 |
| 38 | DF | (Italy) ITA | Davide Costanzo | 0 | 0 | 0 | 0 | 0 | 0 | 0 | 0 |
| 59 | DF | (Italy) ITA | Alessandro Zanoli | 13 | 0 | 5+7 | 0 | 0 | 0 | 0+1 | 0 |
Midfielders
| 4 | MF | (Germany) GER | Diego Demme | 25 | 1 | 7+12 | 1 | 1 | 0 | 4+1 | 0 |
| 7 | MF | (North Macedonia) MKD | Eljif Elmas | 46 | 7 | 12+25 | 3 | 1 | 0 | 7+1 | 4 |
| 8 | MF | (Spain) ESP | Fabián Ruiz | 38 | 7 | 29+3 | 7 | 0+1 | 0 | 4+1 | 0 |
| 20 | MF | (Poland) POL | Piotr Zieliński | 42 | 8 | 26+9 | 6 | 0 | 0 | 7 | 2 |
| 68 | MF | (Slovakia) SVK | Stanislav Lobotka | 26 | 1 | 19+4 | 1 | 1 | 0 | 1+1 | 0 |
| 99 | MF | (Cameroon) CMR | André-Frank Zambo Anguissa | 30 | 0 | 21+4 | 0 | 0 | 0 | 4+1 | 0 |
Forwards
| 9 | FW | (Nigeria) NGR | Victor Osimhen | 32 | 18 | 23+4 | 14 | 0 | 0 | 3+2 | 4 |
| 11 | FW | (Mexico) MEX | Hirving Lozano | 37 | 6 | 20+10 | 5 | 0+1 | 0 | 5+1 | 1 |
| 14 | FW | (Belgium) BEL | Dries Mertens | 37 | 13 | 16+14 | 11 | 1 | 1 | 2+4 | 1 |
| 21 | FW | (Italy) ITA | Matteo Politano | 39 | 5 | 20+13 | 3 | 1 | 0 | 1+4 | 2 |
| 24 | FW | (Italy) ITA | Lorenzo Insigne | 37 | 13 | 28+4 | 11 | 0 | 0 | 5 | 2 |
| 33 | FW | (Algeria) ALG | Adam Ounas | 21 | 2 | 1+14 | 0 | 0 | 0 | 1+5 | 2 |
| 37 | FW | (Italy) ITA | Andrea Petagna | 32 | 4 | 4+20 | 3 | 1 | 1 | 4+3 | 0 |
| 58 | FW | (Italy) ITA | Antonio Cioffi | 1 | 0 | 0 | 0 | 0+1 | 0 | 0 | 0 |
Players transferred out during the season
| 44 | DF | (Greece) GRE | Kostas Manolas | 7 | 0 | 3+1 | 0 | 0 | 0 | 2+1 | 0 |
| 70 | MF | (Italy) ITA | Gianluca Gaetano | 2 | 0 | 0+2 | 0 | 0 | 0 | 0 | 0 |

Source: Competitions

=== Goalscorers ===
| Rank | No. | Pos. | Nat. | Player | Serie A | Coppa Italia | Europa League | Total |
|---|---|---|---|---|---|---|---|---|
| 1 | 9 | FW | (Nigeria) | Victor Osimhen | 14 | 0 | 4 | 18 |
| 2 | 14 | FW | (Belgium) | Dries Mertens | 11 | 1 | 1 | 13 |
| 2 | 24 | FW | (Italy) | Lorenzo Insigne | 11 | 0 | 2 | 13 |
| 4 | 20 | MF | (Poland) | Piotr Zieliński | 6 | 0 | 2 | 8 |
| 5 | 7 | MF | (North Macedonia) | Eljif Elmas | 3 | 0 | 4 | 7 |
| 5 | 8 | MF | (Spain) | Fabián Ruiz | 7 | 0 | 0 | 7 |
| 7 | 11 | FW | (Mexico) | Hirving Lozano | 5 | 0 | 1 | 6 |
| 8 | 21 | FW | (Italy) | Matteo Politano | 3 | 0 | 2 | 5 |
| 9 | 13 | DF | (Kosovo) | Amir Rrahmani | 4 | 0 | 0 | 4 |
| 9 | 37 | FW | (Italy) | Andrea Petagna | 3 | 1 | 0 | 4 |
| 11 | 26 | DF | (Senegal) | Kalidou Koulibaly | 3 | 0 | 0 | 3 |
| 12 | 33 | FW | (Algeria) | Adam Ounas | 0 | 0 | 2 | 2 |
| 13 | 4 | MF | (Germany) | Diego Demme | 1 | 0 | 0 | 1 |
| 13 | 5 | DF | (Brazil) | Juan Jesus | 1 | 0 | 0 | 1 |
| 13 | 22 | DF | (Italy) | Giovanni Di Lorenzo | 1 | 0 | 0 | 1 |
| 13 | 68 | MF | (Slovakia) | Stanislav Lobotka | 1 | 0 | 0 | 1 |
| Totals | | | | | 74 | 2 | 18 | 94 |
