= Alessandro Zanoli =

Italian footballer (born 2000)

Personal information
- Date of birth: 3 October 2000 (age 26)
- Place of birth: Carpi, Italy
- Height: 1.88 m (6 ft 2 in)
- Position: Right-back

Team information
- Current team: Udinese
- Number: 59

Youth career
- 2016–2018: Carpi
- 2018–2020: Napoli

Senior career*
Years	Team	Apps	(Gls)
2020–2026	Napoli	17	(0)
2020–2021	→ Legnago (loan)	35	(1)
2023	→ Sampdoria (loan)	22	(2)
2024	→ Salernitana (loan)	17	(0)
2024–2025	→ Genoa (loan)	31	(1)
2025–2026	→ Udinese (loan)	19	(1)
2026–	Udinese	0	(0)

International career^{‡}
2022–2023	Italy U21	2	(0)
- * Club domestic league appearances and goals as of 23:32, 26 January 2026 (UTC) ‡ National team caps and goals as of 24 March 2023

Alessandro Zanoli (born 3 October 2000) is an Italian professional footballer who plays as a right-back for Serie A club Udinese.

== Club career ==
Zanoli made his Napoli debut on 20 September 2021, replacing Mário Rui after 86 minutes in a 4−0 Serie A away win against Udinese. On 4 October 2022, he made his UEFA Champions League debut as a substitute in a 6–1 away win over Ajax.

In January 2023, he joined Sampdoria on loan. Later that year, on 19 March, he netted his first Serie A goal in the stoppage time of a 3–1 win over Hellas Verona.

On 17 January 2024, Zanoli moved on loan to Salernitana. Later that year, on 11 July, he completed a one-season loan move to Genoa. On 4 April 2025, he scored his first goal for the latter in a 1–0 victory over Udinese.

On 1 September 2025, Zanoli joined Udinese on loan with an obligation to buy.

== International career ==
On 6 June 2022, Zanoli made his debut for the Italy U21 squad, in a match won 3–0 against Luxembourg.

== Career statistics ==
As of match played 26 January 2026

Appearances and goals by club, season and competition
Club	Season	League			Cup		Continental		Other		Total	
Club	Season	Division	Apps	Goals	Apps	Goals	Apps	Goals	Apps	Goals	Apps	Goals
Legnago (loan)	2020–21	Serie C	35	1	0	0	—		2 (Note: Appearance(s) in Serie C relegation play-outs)	0	37	1
Napoli	2021–22	Serie A	12	0	0	0	1 (Note: Appearance(s) in UEFA Europa League)	0	—		13	0
Napoli	2022–23	Serie A	1	0	0	0	2 (Note: Appearance(s) in UEFA Champions League)	0	—		3	0
Napoli	2023–24	Serie A	4	0	1	0	1	0	—		6	0
Napoli	Total		17	0	1	0	4	0	—		22	0
Sampdoria (loan)	2022–23	Serie A	22	2	1	0	—		—		23	2
Salernitana (loan)	2023–24	Serie A	17	0	0	0	—		—		17	0
Genoa (loan)	2024–25	Serie A	31	1	2	0	—		—		33	1
Udinese (loan)	2025–26	Serie A	19	1	1	0	—		—		20	1
Career total			141	5	5	0	4	0	2	0	152	5
