= Gianluca Gaetano =

Italian footballer (born 2000)

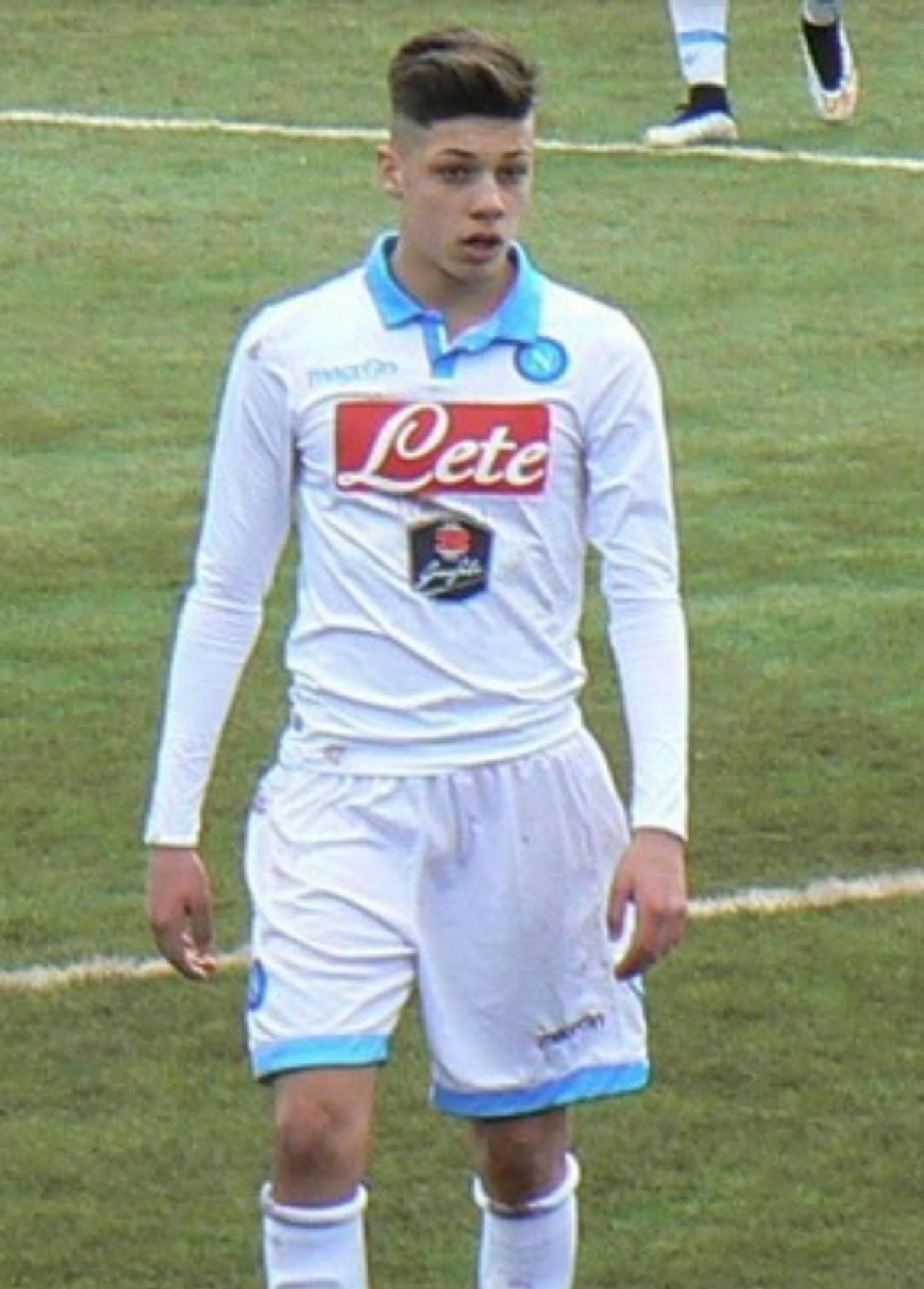
- Gaetano with Napoli in 2017

Personal information
- Date of birth: 5 May 2000 (age 26)
- Place of birth: Naples, Italy
- Height: 1.81 m (5 ft 11 in)
- Position: Midfielder

Team information
- Current team: Atalanta
- Number: 70

Youth career
- 2005–2011: Future Boys di Cimitile
- 2011–2019: Napoli

Senior career*
Years	Team	Apps	(Gls)
2019–2025	Napoli	21	(2)
2020–2021	→ Cremonese (loan)	49	(8)
2021–2022	→ Cremonese (loan)	35	(7)
2024	→ Cagliari (loan)	11	(4)
2024–2025	→ Cagliari (loan)	28	(2)
2025–2026	Cagliari	33	(2)
2026–	Atalanta	6	(1)

International career^{‡}
2015	Italy U15	2	(0)
2015	Italy U16	6	(1)
2016	Italy U17	2	(0)
2018	Italy U19	2	(0)
2019	Italy U20	1	(0)
2022	Italy U21	3	(1)
- * Club domestic league appearances and goals as of 18:15, 18 October 2026 (UTC) ‡ National team caps and goals as of 9 June 2022

Gianluca Gaetano (Italian pronunciation: [dʒanˈluːka ɡaeˈtaːno]; born 5 May 2000) is an Italian professional footballer who plays as a midfielder for Serie A club Atalanta.

He is an academy graduate of Napoli, having joined the club in 2011, and the youngest-ever player in the club's history to have signed a professional contract with the club at the age of 16. On 10 December 2019, Gaetano made his debut in UEFA Champions League against Belgian side Genk.

== Early and personal life ==
Gianluca Gaetano was born and raised in Cimitile, in the Metropolitan City of Naples area. He was born into a family of athletes, his older brother Felice Gaetano is also a professional football player, who also came through the Napoli youth system, he also has two cousins Michele Peluso and Felice Raiola both of whom are professional footballers.

A lifelong supporter of SSC Napoli, Gaetano joined the Campania club when he was just eleven years old and dreams of one day becoming their Captain.

== Club career ==
=== Early youth career ===
Born in Cimitile in Southern Italy just North-East of Naples, Gaetano got his football start with the local team ASD Future Boys di Cimitile at the age of five. During this time at the club, he played with his older brother Felice. While at ASD Future Boys di Cimitile, he along with his older brother were spotted by a Napoli scout, joining their youth system in 2011. Gaetano joined the youth academy of Napoli in 2010,5, and worked his way up through their youth categories.

In the 2017–18 Season Gaetano went on to score 17 goals with 14 assists in all youth competitions forming a formidable partnership with fellow youth player Ciro Palmieri.

In the 2018–19 season Gaetano managed to score five goals in six games in the UEFA Youth League where he stood out against some of the best youth in Europe, his first goal in the competition would come in the 94th minute in a game against Liverpool that ended in a 1–1 draw, he also managed to score a hat trick against Red Star Belgrade in a game Napoli went on to win 5–3.

He went on to captain the Youth team and scored 22 goals with 8 assists in all competitions which was enough for him to be called up to the Napoli first team by manager Carlo Ancelotti and get his professional debut for the Napoli first team.

=== Napoli ===
In 2016 Gaetano became the youngest ever player to sign a professional contract with Napoli at the age of 16. Gaetano made his professional debut with Napoli in a 2–0 Coppa Italia win over U.S. Sassuolo Calcio on 13 January 2019.

On 12 May 2019, he was called on by Napoli coach Carlo Ancelotti in which he made his first ever Serie A debut in a game against S.P.A.L., which would be marked in tragedy, with his grandmother Carmela dying of a heart attack after a confrontation with neighbours during celebrations.

On 10 December 2019, Gaetano made his first UEFA Champions League debut in a home game against Belgian side Genk which Napoli went on to win 4–0 a progressed to the last 16 of the competition.

==== Loans to Cremonese ====
On 21 January 2020, he joined Serie B club Cremonese on loan. On 16 February 2020 he scored his first goal for the club (and in the professional football) in a 5–0 win against Trapani.

On 18 September 2020, the loan was renewed for the 2020–21 season. After appearing for Napoli in the first two games of the 2021–22 Serie A season, on 31 August 2021 he returned to Cremonese on a new loan.

==== Loans to Cagliari ====
On 1 February 2024, Gaetano moved to Cagliari on loan until the end of the season.

On 30 August 2024, the loan was renewed to Cagliari with the obligation to buy set at €6 million, upon the occurrence of certain sporting conditions. Gaetano has signed a contract with Cagliari Calcio till June 2029 that will be in effect if the conditions are fulfilled.

=== Atalanta ===
On 9 July 2026, Atalanta announced the signing of Gaetano on a permanent transfer.

== International career ==
Gaetano is a youth international for Italy he has represented Italy at almost every youth level, and most recently represented the Italy U19s in a pair of friendlies in October 2018.

== Career statistics ==
=== Club ===
As of match played 18 October 2026

Appearances and goals by club, season and competition
Club	Season	League			Coppa Italia		Europe		Other		Total	
Club	Season	Division	Apps	Goals	Apps	Goals	Apps	Goals	Apps	Goals	Apps	Goals
Napoli	2018–19	Serie A	2	0	1	0	0	0	–		3	0
Napoli	2019–20	Serie A	0	0	0	0	1	0	–		1	0
Napoli	2021–22	Serie A	2	0	0	0	0	0	–		2	0
Napoli	2022–23	Serie A	8	1	1	0	3	0	–		12	1
Napoli	2023–24	Serie A	9	1	1	0	1	0	2	0	13	1
Napoli	Total		21	2	3	0	5	0	2	0	31	2
Cremonese (loan)	2019–20	Serie B	15	3	0	0	–		–		15	3
Cremonese (loan)	2020–21	Serie B	34	5	2	2	–		–		36	7
Cremonese (loan)	2021–22	Serie B	35	7	0	0	–		–		35	7
Cremonese (loan)	Total		84	15	2	2	–		–		86	17
Cagliari	2023–24	Serie A	11	4	–		–		–		11	4
Cagliari	2024–25	Serie A	28	2	2	0	–		–		30	2
Cagliari	2025–26	Serie A	33	2	2	1	–		–		35	3
Cagliari	Total		72	8	4	1	–		–		76	9
Atalanta	2026–27	Serie A	6	1	0	0	3	0	0	0	9	1
Career total			183	26	9	3	8	0	2	0	202	29

== Honours ==
Napoli

- Serie A: 2022–23
