= Piotr Zieliński =

Polish footballer (born 1994)

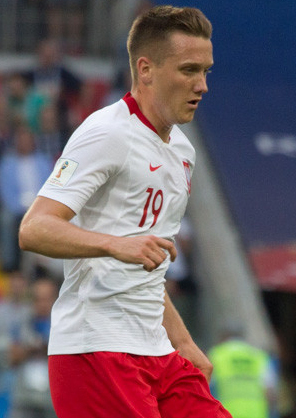
- Zieliński with Poland at the 2018 FIFA World Cup

Personal information
- Full name: Piotr Sebastian Zieliński
- Date of birth: 20 May 1994 (age 32)
- Place of birth: Ząbkowice Śląskie, Poland
- Height: 1.80 m (5 ft 11 in)
- Position: Midfielder

Team information
- Current team: Inter Milan
- Number: 7

Youth career
- 2003–2007: Orzeł Ząbkowice Śląskie
- 2007–2011: Zagłębie Lubin
- 2011–2012: Udinese

Senior career*
Years	Team	Apps	(Gls)
2012–2016	Udinese	19	(0)
2014–2016	→ Empoli (loan)	63	(5)
2016–2024	Napoli	281	(37)
2024–	Inter Milan	70	(10)

International career^{‡}
2009	Poland U15	5	(1)
2009–2010	Poland U16	6	(0)
2010–2011	Poland U17	10	(1)
2012	Poland U18	5	(1)
2011–2012	Poland U19	15	(5)
2012–2013	Poland U21	3	(1)
2013–	Poland	114	(18)
- * Club domestic league appearances and goals as of 22:32, 8 November 2026 (UTC) ‡ National team caps and goals as of 23:23, 17 November 2026 (UTC)

Piotr Sebastian Zieliński (Polish pronunciation: [ˈpjɔtr ʑɛˈlij̃skʲi]; born 20 May 1994) is a Polish professional footballer who plays as a midfielder for Serie A club Inter Milan and the Poland national team. Known for his versatility, precision passing, dribbling, and endurance, he is considered one of the greatest Polish footballers of all time.

Zieliński began his senior club career at Italian club Udinese in 2012 before joining Empoli on loan in 2014. He then joined fellow Italian club Napoli for a reported €16 million fee in 2016. During his spell at Napoli, he established himself as a key player of the team, winning the Coppa Italia and helping the club to win the first Serie A title in 33 years. He appeared in 364 official matches for Napoli, which makes him one of the club's most consistent and long-serving players during his tenure from 2016 to 2024. In 2024, he moved to Inter Milan.

At the international level, Zieliński has earned over 100 caps for Poland since 2013. He was selected to represent the nation at UEFA Euro 2016 in France, where he helped his team reach the quarter-finals. He also participated at the 2018 FIFA World Cup in Russia, the pan-European UEFA Euro 2020, the 2022 World Cup in Qatar, and the UEFA Euro 2024 in Germany. In 2023, he was named the Polish Footballer of the Year.

== Club career ==
=== Early career ===
Zieliński started his career at his local club, Orzeł Ząbkowice Śląskie, where he was coached by his father. At the age of 14, he joined Zagłębie Lubin, even though he was wanted by Bayer Leverkusen and Liverpool and also had trials at Feyenoord and Heerenveen. He spent four years at the academy playing in the Młoda Ekstraklasa League and was regularly called up to the Poland national under-17 football team. He rose through the ranks and started training with the first team at the age of 15, under Franciszek Smuda. At 17, he moved abroad to join Udinese after they scouted him on international youth tournament.

=== Udinese ===
In the 2011–12 season, he played in the Campionato Nazionale Primavera scoring two goals in twelve matches. Zieliński made his debut in Serie A on 2 November 2012 when he replaced Antonio Di Natale in 91st minute of a match against Cagliari. On 14 April 2013, he made his first appearance in the club's starting lineup and registered an assist in Udinese's convincing 3–0 victory over Parma.

==== Empoli (loan) ====
In 2014, Zieliński joined Empoli on loan. On 13 August 2014, he made his official debut for Empoli replacing Daniele Croce in the 80th minute of the match against AS Roma, which ended in a 0–1 loss for his club. On 3 December 2014, he made his debut appearance in Coppa Italia in a 2–0 victory over Genoa. On 26 April 2015, he provided an assist in a 2–2 draw against Atalanta. Zieliński ended his season-long loan to Empoli with 30 appearances and 3 assists. In July 2015, he extended his contract with the club for another season.

He began the 2015–16 Serie A season as a starter in Maurizio Sarri's team. On 13 September 2015, he assisted Riccardo Saponara's goal in a 2–2 draw against Napoli. On 4 October 2015, he registered an assist for Massimo Maccarone's deciding goal in Empoli's 1–0 victory over Sassuolo. In the 90th minute of the match, he was given a second yellow card forcing him to leave the pitch. On 24 October 2015, he scored his first goal in Serie A with a well-placed header in a 2–0 victory over Genoa.

On 23 January 2016, he scored against AC Milan in a match, which concluded in a 1–1 draw. On 21 February 2016, he scored a goal against Sassuolo in a match which concluded in Empoli's 2–3 loss and on 10 April he scored again against Fiorentina securing a 2–0 victory for his team. Zieliński played a total of 37 matches for Empoli in the season scoring 5 goals and delivering 3 assists. Before the start of the next season, Zieliński prepared to change clubs and held talks with a number of clubs including Liverpool.

=== Napoli ===
==== 2016–2017 season ====
On 4 August 2016, after months of transfer speculation, Zieliński moved from Udinese to Napoli for a reported €16 million. On 21 August 2016, he made his debut appearance for Napoli, alongside his compatriot Arkadiusz Milik, substituting Marek Hamšík in the 71st minute of the match against Pescara, which ultimately concluded in a 2–2 draw. On 10 September 2016, he debuted in Napoli's starting lineup and provided an assist to José Callejón's goal against Palermo in Napoli's 3–0 victory. On 13 September 2016, Zieliński made his Champions League debut in Napoli's match against Dynamo Kyiv, which concluded in his team's 2–1 victory. He became the 57th Polish player to participate in Champions League representing a foreign club.

On 7 January 2017, his performance in the match against Sampdoria (2–1) marked his 100th match played in Serie A. On 14 May 2017, he netted the final goal in Napoli's decisive 5–0 away win against Torino. He scored his first goal with Partenopei's shirt on 3 December, in a 3–0 home win against Inter Milan; he ended his first season with six goals and six assists in 47 mataches.

==== 2017–2018 season ====
Zieliński began the 2017–18 Serie A season as a starting lineup player in the match against Verona, which took place on 19 August and concluded with Napoli's 3–1 win. On 27 August 2017, he scored an equalizer to make it 1–1 in Napoli's 3–1 win over Atalanta. On 10 September 2017, he netted a goal against Bologna contributing to a comfortable 3–0 victory for Napoli. On 18 November 2017, he entered the pitch in the 69th minute of the match against AC Milan as a substitute for Marek Hamšík and scored the second goal in Napoli's narrow 2–1 victory.

On 21 November 2017, Zieliński scored his first Champions League goal in the match against Shakhtar Donetsk, which ended with Napoli's decisive 3–0 win. He netted another Champions League goal on 6 December 2017, in the match against Feyenoord, which ultimately concluded with his club's 1–2 loss. On 16 December 2017, he scored in a Serie A match against Torino to make it 2–0 after an assist from Jorginho, the match eventually ending in Napoli's 3–1 victory. On 22 February 2018, he scored his first goal in UEFA Europa League in the match against RB Leipzig, contributing to a 2–0 victory for Napoli. He finished the season having played in 36 Serie A matches and scoring 4 goals while Napoli finished as runners-up four points behind Juventus.

==== 2018–2019 season ====
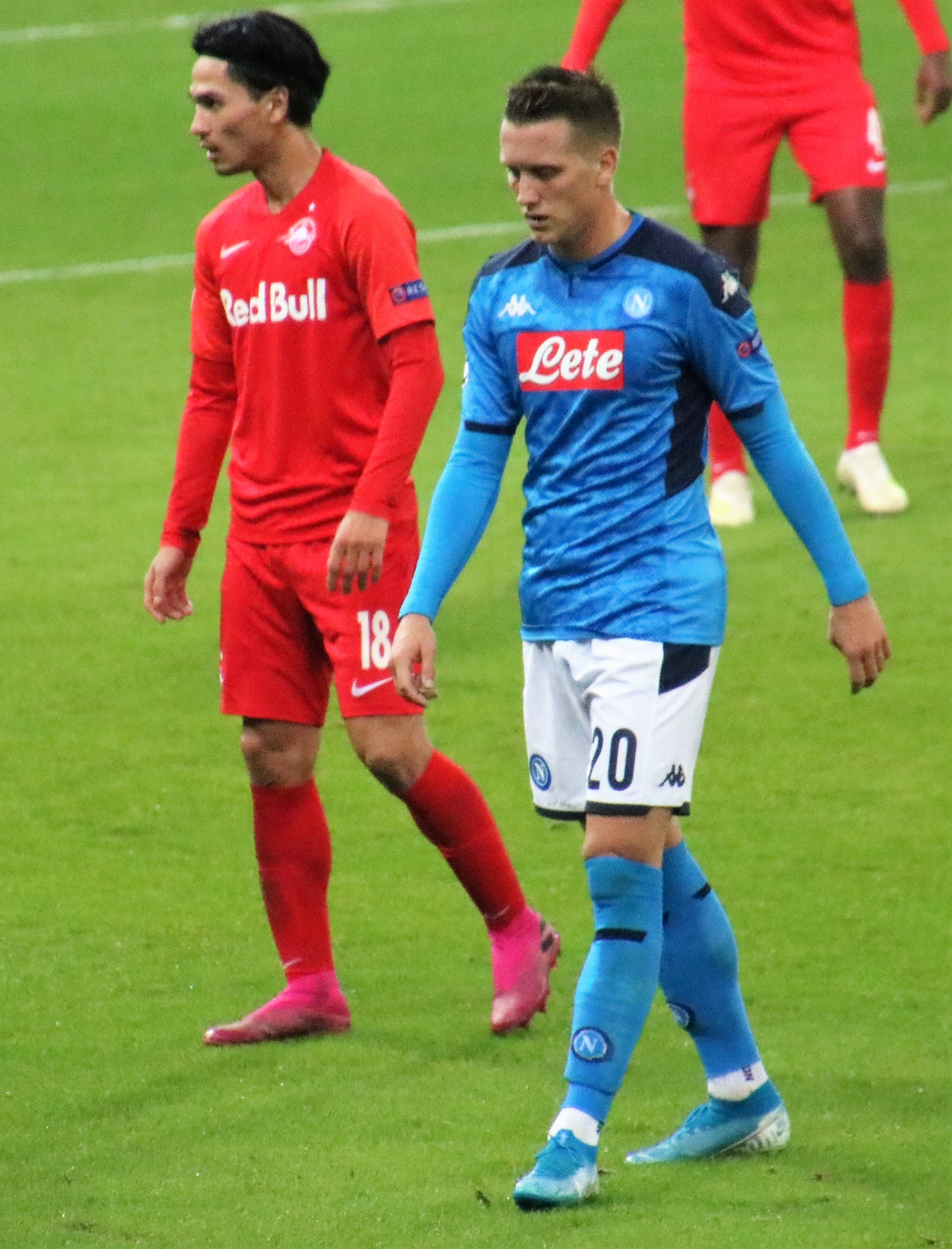
Piotr Zieliński (right) in a UEFA Champions League match against Red Bull Salzburg, 2019.

In the first round of the 2018–19 Serie A season, Zieliński played in the match against Lazio that his club won 2–1. In his next match, on 25 August 2018, he netted a brace in a hard-fought win against AC Milan in which his team came back from a 2–0 deficit. On 8 December 2018, he scored again in Napoli's emphatic 4–0 win over Frosinone. On 14 February 2019, he scored a goal in a UEFA Europa League match against FC Zürich (3–1).

On 24 February 2019, Zieliński scored a goal after an assist from Elseid Hysaj in the match against Parma (4–0). On 7 May 2019, Dries Mertens scored a goal after collecting a pass from Zieliński in a 1–1 draw against Genoa. On 19 May 2019, he scored Napoli's first goal in the club's 4–1 victory over Inter Milan.

==== 2019–2020 season ====
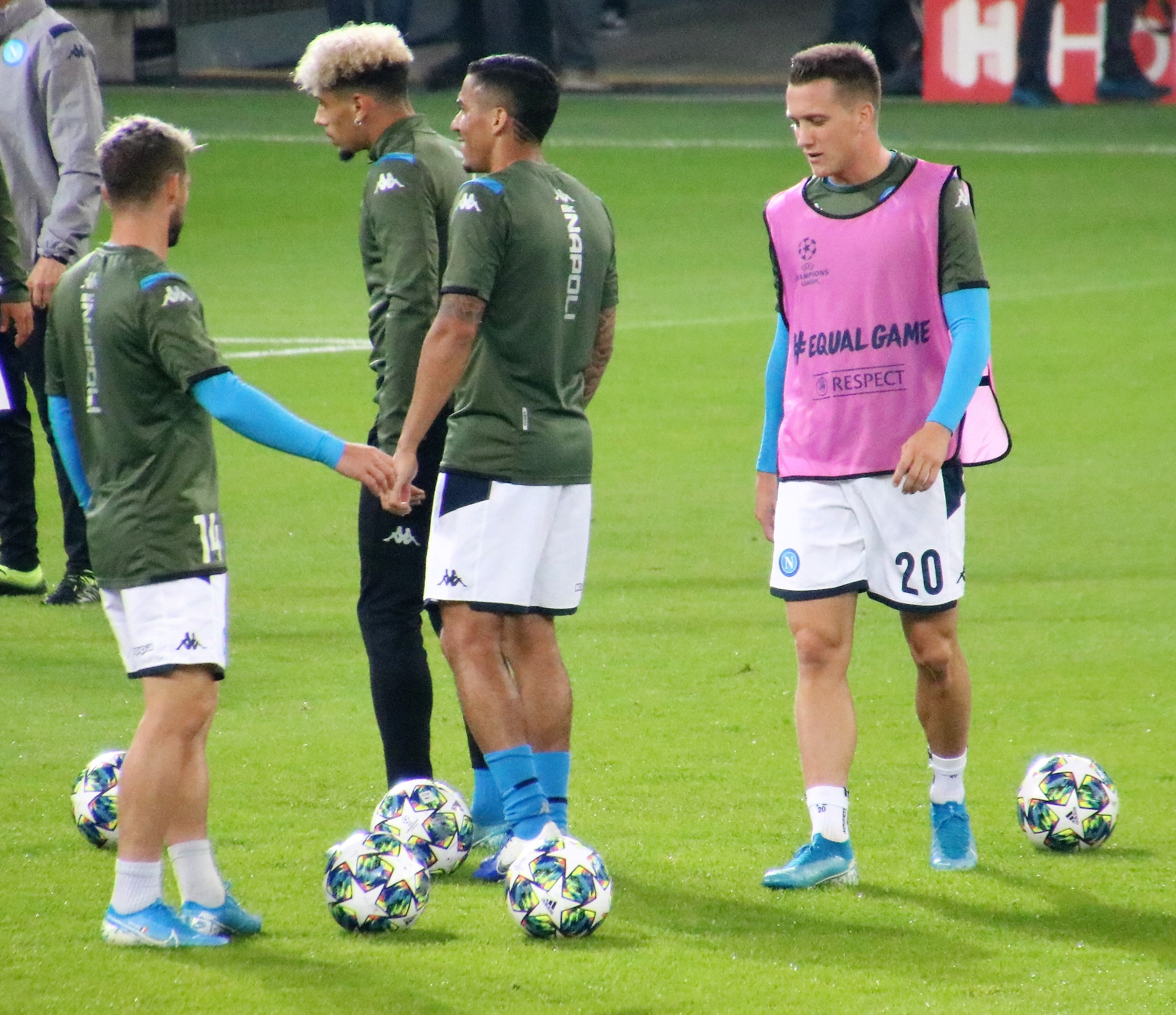
Zieliński (first from right) during a warm-up with Napoli in 2019

On 31 August 2019, he registered an assist to Hirving Lozano's goal in Napoli's 3–4 loss to Juventus. On 7 December 2019, he netted an equalizer and secured a 1–1 draw against Udinese. On 26 January 2020, he scored the first goal in Napoli's 2–1 win against Juventus. On 3 February 2020, he provided an assist to compatriot Arkadiusz Milik's goal in Napoli's 4–2 victory over Sampdoria. On 25 February 2020, he provided an assist in a Champions League match against Barcelona, which concluded in a 1–1 draw. On 17 June 2020, Zieliński won the Coppa Italia with Napoli beating Juventus in the final penalty shootout. On 31 August 2020, he signed new contract with Napoli until June 2023.

==== 2020–2021 season ====
Zieliński started the season playing the full 90 minutes against Parma (2–0) in the first round of Serie A. On 27 September 2020, he scored a goal and registered an assist in Napoli's resounding 6–0 win over Genoa. Zieliński tested positive for COVID-19 and as a result missed the next two matches against Atalanta and Benevento. He returned to the starting line-up on 29 November 2020 in the match against AS Roma (4–0) after making a full recovery. On 10 December 2020, he scored a goal in a UEFA Europa League group stage match against Real Sociedad (1–1).

On 3 January 2021, he scored two goals in a 4–1 win over Cagliari. On 17 January 2021, he scored again in the match against Fiorentina (6–0) delivering a precise strike from outside the penalty area. On 6 February 2021, he played as Napoli's captain for the first time in the match against Genoa (1–2). On 3 March 2021, he netted a goal contributing to a 3–3 draw against Sassuolo and in the next Serie A match against Bologna (3–1), he delivered two assists to Lorenzo Insigne's and Victor Osimhen's goals respectively. On 14 March 2021, he registered an assist to Matteo Politano's decisive goal in Napoli's 1–0 victory over AC Milan. On 8 May 2021, he scored a goal and registered an assist in the match against Spezia, which concluded in Napoli's 4–1 win. Zieliński ended the season scoring 10 goals and delivering 13 assists for the club in 46 official matches.

==== 2021–2022 season ====
On 21 August 2021, he sustained a quadriceps injury in a match against Venezia (2–0), which prevented him from playing in the next match against Genoa. On 23 September 2021, he returned to the starting lineup and scored his first goal in the 2021–22 Serie A season in a 4–0 victory over Sampdoria. On 26 September 2021, he registered an assist in Napoli's 2–0 victory over Cagliari and repeated this in the next match on 3 October against Fiorentina (2–1).

On 31 October 2021, not only did he decide the derby between Salernitana and Napoli, scoring the only goal of the game, but with 32 goals he also became the second best Polish goal-scorer in Serie A's history (behind Arkadiusz Milik), beating Zbigniew Boniek's record. On 17 February 2022, he scored a goal for Napoli in a Europa League match against Barcelona which ended in a 1–1 draw. On 15 August 2022, he scored against Hellas Verona contributing to his side's 5–2 victory at the Stadio Marcantonio Bentegodi.

==== 2022–2023 season ====
On 21 August 2022, he registered two assists in Napoli's 4–0 victory over Monza. On 4 October 2022, he scored another Champions League goal in a match against Ajax, which concluded in Napoli's 6–1 demolition of the Dutch side. On 4 May 2023, after a 1–1 draw against Udinese, Zielinski celebrated with Napoli the club's first Serie A title in 33 years since Diego Maradona won the title in 1990. On 24 December 2023, he was named Polish Footballer of the Year beating Robert Lewandowski by 12 points and breaking his four consecutive win streak.

==== 2023–2024: final season with Napoli ====
On 7 April 2024, he scored a goal in the match against Monza, which ended in Napoli's 4–2 win. On 7 September 2022, he scored two goals and provided one assist in a Champions League group stage match against Liverpool, which concluded in a 4–1 victory for Napoli. At the end of June 2024, it was announced on the official website that Zieliński along with five other players left the club, following the contract expiration. At Napoli, Zieliński played a total of 364 matches scoring 51 goals and providing 46 assists.

=== Inter Milan ===
On 3 July 2024, Zieliński signed for the fellow Serie A club Inter Milan on a free transfer following the expiration of his Napoli contract. On 27 October 2024, Zieliński scored two goals, both from penalty kicks, in a Derby d'Italia match against Juventus, which ended in a 4–4 draw. The two goals were his first goals scored for Inter Milan. On 26 November 2024, Zieliński received the UEFA Man of the Match award for his performance in Inter Milan's 1–0 victory over RB Leipzig at San Siro in a league phase match of the 2024–25 UEFA Champions League. On 23 December 2024, Zieliński entered the pitch in the second half and of the match against Como and provided an assist contributing to Inter's 2–0 victory.

On 2 November 2025, Zieliński scored an absolute screamer against Hellas Verona to make it 1–0, scoring a spectacular goal with a perfect cross by Hakan Çalhanoğlu, with the match ending 2–1 in favour of Inter. The goal led to him winning the Serie A Goal of the Month.

On 24 February 2026, Zieliński scored the decisive goal in the 90th minute of the match against Juventus, sealing a 3–2 victory for Inter. On 17 April 2026, Zieliński scored in a 3–0 victory against Cagliari. It was his 50th goal in Serie A, which made him the most successful Polish goalscorer in Serie A history. On 25 October 2026, Zieliński scored a goal for Inter Milan from a penalty kick in the 97th minute of the match against Fiorentina, securing a 2–1 victory for his side.

== International career ==
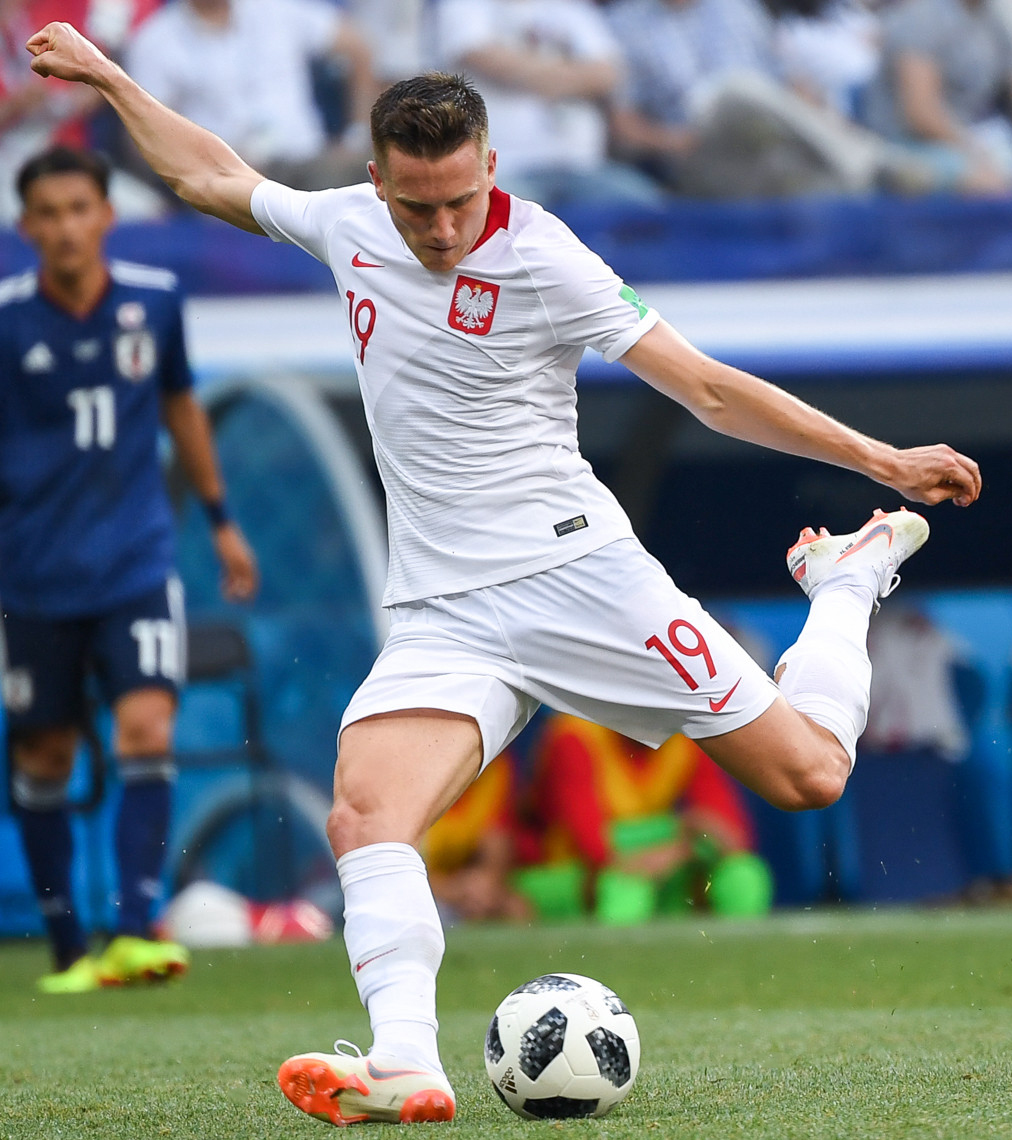
Zieliński with Poland at the 2018 FIFA World Cup playing against Japan.

On 4 June 2013, Zieliński made his senior international debut for the Poland national team in a friendly match against Liechtenstein. On 31 July 2013, he was called up for a friendly match against Denmark scoring his first goal for the national team in the second half and securing a 3–2 win for Poland.

On 27 March 2018, he scored a goal in a friendly match against South Korea, which concluded in Poland's 3–2 win. In May 2018, he was named in Poland's preliminary 35-man squad for the 2018 World Cup in Russia. On 7 September 2018, he scored a goal after an assist from Robert Lewandowski against Italy in a UEFA Nations League match that ended in a 1–1 draw. On 10 June 2019, he registered an assist to Kamil Grosicki's goal in a UEFA European Championship elimination match against Israel contributing to a 4–0 victory for Poland.

On 5 March 2021, he provided an assist to Kamil Jóźwiak's goal in a FIFA World Cup elimination match against Hungary at the Puskás Aréna, which concluded in a 3–3 draw. On 8 June 2021, he netted a goal in a friendly match against Iceland. On 23 June 2021, he provided an assist to Robert Lewandowski's goal to make it 1–2 in a UEFA Euro 2020 group stage match against Sweden, which ended in Poland's 2–3 loss. On 26 November 2022, he scored the first goal in Poland's 2–0 victory over Saudi Arabia in a group stage match at the 2022 World Cup. On 7 June 2024, he scored a goal in a friendly match against Ukraine at the National Stadium contributing to Poland's 3–1 victory. He provided an assist in the Euro 2024 group stage match against the Netherlands. On 15 October 2024, he scored a goal in a 3–3 draw against Croatia in the group stage of the UEFA Nations League.

On 8 June 2025, Zieliński was named new captain of the Poland national team by head coach Michał Probierz, taking over from Robert Lewandowski. He made no appearances as captain before the role was handed back to Lewandowski by newly appointed head coach Jan Urban in August 2025. Later that year, on 4 September, he featured in his 100th international match in a 1–1 away draw against the Netherlands during the 2026 FIFA World Cup qualification.

== Style of play ==
Zieliński usually plays the left-sided midfielder role as a part of the midfield three or two, and has occasionally played on the right side to implement specific in-game tactics. Exceptional ball control, precision passing and the ability of maneuvering through tight spaces are seen as his distinctive strengths. One of Zieliński's other notable skills on the pitch is the ability to shoot with either foot equally well. His ambidexterity had been perfected with much work and practice since early childhood.

His consistency, the ability to read the game and crucial passes made him one of the pillars of the team during his spell at Napoli contributing to his club winning the Coppa Italia in 2020 and the Serie A title in 2023. Zieliński cites Zinedine Zidane and Marek Hamšík as his footballing inspirations. He also admired Tomáš Rosický in his youth.

== Personal life ==
His older brothers Tomasz and Paweł are also footballers. On 15 June 2019, Zieliński married Laura Słowiak with whom he has a son, Maksymilian (born 2021). In 2021, he passed an Italian language exam at the B2 level at the University of Naples.

On 9 January 2023, he was awarded the Father Albert Medal for establishing and funding two children's homes in Lower Silesia. On 6 October 2023, Zieliński also formally received the Italian citizenship. On 27 December 2023, he became an honorary citizen of Giugliano in Campania.

== Career statistics ==
=== Club ===
As of match played 8 November 2026

Appearances and goals by club, season and competition
Club	Season	League			Coppa Italia		Europe		Other		Total	
Club	Season	Division	Apps	Goals	Apps	Goals	Apps	Goals	Apps	Goals	Apps	Goals
Udinese	2012–13	Serie A	9	0	0	0	0	0	—		9	0
Udinese	2013–14	Serie A	10	0	0	0	1 (Note: Appearance(s) in UEFA Europa League)	0	—		11	0
Udinese	Total		19	0	0	0	1	0	—		20	0
Empoli (loan)	2014–15	Serie A	28	0	2	0	—		—		30	0
Empoli (loan)	2015–16	Serie A	35	5	1	0	—		—		36	5
Empoli (loan)	Total		63	5	3	0	—		—		66	5
Napoli	2016–17	Serie A	36	5	4	1	7 (Note: Appearances in UEFA Champions League)	0	—		47	6
Napoli	2017–18	Serie A	36	4	2	0	9 (Note: Seven appearances and two goals in UEFA Champions League, two appearances and one goal in UEFA Europa League)	3	—		47	7
Napoli	2018–19	Serie A	36	6	1	0	12 (Note: Six appearances in UEFA Champions League, six appearances and one goal in UEFA Europa League)	1	—		49	7
Napoli	2019–20	Serie A	37	2	5	0	7	0	—		49	2
Napoli	2020–21	Serie A	36	8	4	0	6	2	1 (Note: Appearance in Supercoppa Italiana)	0	47	10
Napoli	2021–22	Serie A	35	6	0	0	7	2	—		42	8
Napoli	2022–23	Serie A	37	3	1	0	10	4	—		48	7
Napoli	2023–24	Serie A	28	3	0	0	6	1	1	0	35	4
Napoli	Total		281	37	17	1	64	13	2	0	364	51
Inter Milan	2024–25	Serie A	26	2	2	0	10	0	1	0	39	2
Inter Milan	2025–26	Serie A	34	6	4	0	10	1	1	0	49	7
Inter Milan	2026–27	Serie A	10	2	0	0	4	1	0	0	14	3
Inter Milan	Total		70	10	6	0	24	2	2	0	102	12
Career total			433	52	26	1	89	15	4	0	552	68

=== International ===
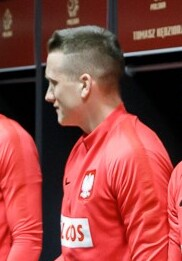
Zieliński with Poland in 2019

As of match played 17 November 2026

Appearances and goals by national team and year
National team	Year	Apps	Goals
Poland	2013	7	3
Poland	2014	1	0
Poland	2015	3	0
Poland	2016	10	0
Poland	2017	8	0
Poland	2018	12	3
Poland	2019	10	0
Poland	2020	5	0
Poland	2021	10	1
Poland	2022	12	3
Poland	2023	8	0
Poland	2024	13	4
Poland	2025	6	2
Poland	2026	9	2
Total		114	18

Scores and results list Poland's goal tally first, score column indicates score after each Zieliński goal.

List of international goals scored by Piotr Zieliński
No.	Date	Venue	Opponent	Score	Result	Competition
1	14 August 2013	Gdańsk Stadium, Gdańsk, Poland	Denmark	3–2	3–2	Friendly
2	10 September 2013	San Marino Stadium, Serravalle, San Marino	San Marino	1–0	5–1	2014 FIFA World Cup qualification
3	10 September 2013	San Marino Stadium, Serravalle, San Marino	San Marino	4–1	5–1	2014 FIFA World Cup qualification
4	27 March 2018	Silesian Stadium, Chorzów, Poland	South Korea	3–2	3–2	Friendly
5	8 June 2018	Poznań Stadium, Poznań, Poland	Chile	2–0	2–2	Friendly
6	7 September 2018	Stadio Renato Dall'Ara, Bologna, Italy	Italy	1–0	1–1	2018–19 UEFA Nations League A
7	8 June 2021	Poznań Stadium, Poznań, Poland	Iceland	1–1	2–2	Friendly
8	29 March 2022	Silesian Stadium, Chorzów, Poland	Sweden	2–0	2–0	2022 FIFA World Cup qualification
9	11 June 2022	De Kuip, Rotterdam, Netherlands	Netherlands	2–0	2–2	2022–23 UEFA Nations League A
10	26 November 2022	Education City Stadium, Al Rayyan, Qatar	Saudi Arabia	1–0	2–0	2022 FIFA World Cup
11	21 March 2024	Stadion Narodowy, Warsaw, Poland	Estonia	2–0	5–1	UEFA Euro 2024 qualifying
12	7 June 2024	Stadion Narodowy, Warsaw, Poland	Ukraine	2–0	3–1	Friendly
13	12 October 2024	Stadion Narodowy, Warsaw, Poland	Portugal	1–2	1–3	2024–25 UEFA Nations League A
14	15 October 2024	Stadion Narodowy, Warsaw, Poland	Croatia	1–0	3–3	2024–25 UEFA Nations League A
15	9 October 2025	Silesian Stadium, Chorzów, Poland	New Zealand	1–0	1–0	Friendly
16	17 November 2025	National Stadium, Ta' Qali, Malta	Malta	3–2	3–2	2026 FIFA World Cup qualification
17	26 March 2026	Stadion Narodowy, Warsaw, Poland	Albania	2–1	2–1	2026 FIFA World Cup qualification
18	2 October 2026	Stadion Narodowy, Warsaw, Poland	Romania	4–0	6–0	2026–27 UEFA Nations League B

== Honours ==
Napoli

- Serie A: 2022–23
- Coppa Italia: 2019–20

Inter Milan

- Serie A: 2025–26
- Coppa Italia: 2025–26
- UEFA Champions League runner-up: 2024–25

Poland U21

- Four Nations Tournament: 2014–15

Individual

- Polish Footballer of the Year: 2023
- Serie A Goal of the Month: November 2025
- Premio Gentleman Fairplay Award (2026)

== See also ==
- List of men's footballers with 100 or more international caps
