= Davide Marfella =

Italian footballer (born 1999) that plays as a goalkeeper for S.S.C.Bari

Personal information
- Date of birth: 15 September 1999 (age 27)
- Place of birth: Pozzuoli, Italy
- Height: 1.80 m (5 ft 11 in)
- Position: Goalkeeper

Team information
- Current team: Foggia
- Number: 12

Youth career
- 2005–2015: Puteolana
- 2015–2016: Savoia
- 2016–2017: Napoli

Senior career*
Years	Team	Apps	(Gls)
2017–2019	Napoli	0	(0)
2017–2018	→ Vis Pesaro (loan)	0	(0)
2018–2019	→ Bari (loan)	34	(0)
2019–2021	Bari	4	(0)
2021–2023	Napoli	1	(0)
2023–2024	Casertana	1	(0)
2024–2026	Bari	0	(0)
2026–	Foggia	0	(0)
- * Club domestic league appearances and goals as of 24 August 2026

Davide Marfella (Napoli 15 September 1999) is an Italian professional footballer who plays as a goalkeeper for Serie C Group C club Foggia.

== Club career ==
Formed in the Napoli youth system, Marfella joined to Bari on 24 July 2019.

== Career statistics ==
=== Club ===
As of match played 4 October 2023

Appearances and goals by club, season and competition
Club	Season	League			National Cup		Other		Europe		Total	
Club	Season	Division	Apps	Goals	Apps	Goals	Apps	Goals	Apps	Goals	Apps	Goals
Napoli	2018–19	Serie A	0	0	—		—		—		0	0
Vis Pesaro (loan)	2017–18	Serie D	34	0	—		—		2 (Note: One appearance in Serie D Playoffs, one appearance in Coppa Italia Serie D)	0	36	0
Bari (loan)	2018–19	Serie D	34	0	—		—		2 (Note: Appearance(s) in Serie D Playoffs)	0	36	0
Bari	2019–20	Serie C	3	0	—		—		0	0	3	0
Bari	2020–21	Serie C	1	0	1	0	—		0	0	2	0
Bari	Total		38	0	1	0	—		2	0	41	0
Napoli	2021–22	Serie A	1	0	0	0	0	0	—		1	0
Napoli	2022–23	Serie A	0	0	0	0	0	0	—		0	0
Napoli	Total		1	0	0	0	0	0	—		1	0
Casertana	2023–24	Serie C	1	0	0	0	—		1 (Note: Appearance(s) in Coppa Italia Serie C)	0	1	0
Career total			73	0	1	0	0	0	5	0	79	0

== Honours ==
Napoli

- Serie A: 2022–23
