= 2022–23 SSC Napoli season =

Napoli
2022–23 season
- President: Aurelio De Laurentiis
- Head coach: Luciano Spalletti
- Stadium: Stadio Diego Armando Maradona
- Serie A: 1st
- Coppa Italia: Round of 16
- UEFA Champions League: Quarter-finals
- Top goalscorer: League: Victor Osimhen (26); All: Victor Osimhen (31)
- Highest home attendance: 54,000 vs Lazio, 3 March 2023, Serie A
- Lowest home attendance: 32,000 vs Cremonese, 17 January 2023, Coppa Italia
- Average home league attendance: 44,912
- Biggest win: 6–1 vs Ajax (away), 4 October 2022, Champions League
- Biggest defeat: 0–4 vs Milan (home), 2 April 2023, Serie A
Home colours	Away colours	Third colours

The 2022–23 season was the 97th season in the history of SSC Napoli and their 16th consecutive season in the Italian top flight. The club participated in the Serie A, the Coppa Italia, and the UEFA Champions League.

Napoli secured a third Serie A title with five matches to spare, marking a first top league title since the 1989–90 season. The club also reached the quarter-finals of the Champions League for the first time in history.

The season was the first since 2009–10 without Lorenzo Insigne, who departed to Toronto FC, and the first since 2012–13 without Dries Mertens, who departed to Galatasaray.

== Players ==
As of 25 January 2023

Note: Flags indicate national team as defined under FIFA eligibility rules; some limited exceptions apply. Players may hold more than one non-FIFA nationality.

No.	Pos.	Nation	Player
1	GK	ITA	Alex Meret (5th captain)
3	DF	KOR	Kim Min-jae
4	MF	GER	Diego Demme
5	DF	BRA	Juan Jesus
6	DF	POR	Mário Rui (vice-captain)
7	MF	MKD	Eljif Elmas (4th captain)
9	FW	NGR	Victor Osimhen
11	FW	MEX	Hirving Lozano
12	GK	ITA	Davide Marfella
13	DF	KOS	Amir Rrahmani
16	GK	POL	Hubert Idasiak
17	DF	URU	Mathías Olivera
18	FW	ARG	Giovanni Simeone (on loan from Hellas Verona)
19	DF	POL	Bartosz Bereszyński (on loan from Sampdoria)

No.	Pos.	Nation	Player
20	MF	POL	Piotr Zieliński (3rd captain)
21	FW	ITA	Matteo Politano
22	DF	ITA	Giovanni Di Lorenzo (captain)
23	FW	ITA	Alessio Zerbin
31	MF	ALG	Karim Zedadka
55	DF	NOR	Leo Skiri Østigård
68	MF	SVK	Stanislav Lobotka
70	MF	ITA	Gianluca Gaetano
77	FW	GEO	Khvicha Kvaratskhelia
81	FW	ITA	Giacomo Raspadori (on loan from Sassuolo)
91	MF	FRA	Tanguy Ndombele (on loan from Tottenham Hotspur)
95	GK	ITA	Pierluigi Gollini (on loan from Atalanta)
99	MF	CMR	André-Frank Zambo Anguissa

== Transfers ==
=== In ===
Pos.	Player	Transferred from	Fee	Date	Source
DF	(Uruguay) Mathías Olivera	(Spain) Getafe	€11M	1 July 2022	
MF	(Cameroon) André-Frank Zambo Anguissa	(England) Fulham	€15M	1 July 2022	
MF	(Georgia (country)) Khvicha Kvaratskhelia	(Georgia (country)) Dinamo Batumi	€10M	1 July 2022	
DF	(Norway) Leo Skiri Østigård	(England) Brighton & Hove Albion	€5M	18 July 2022	
DF	(South Korea) Kim Min-jae	(Turkey) Fenerbahçe	€18M	27 July 2022	
GK	(Italy) Salvatore Sirigu	(Italy) Genoa	Free	11 August 2022	
FW	(Argentina) Giovanni Simeone	(Italy) Hellas Verona	Loan	18 August 2022	
MF	(France) Tanguy Ndombele	(England) Tottenham Hotspur	Loan	19 August 2022	
FW	(Italy) Giacomo Raspadori	(Italy) Sassuolo	Loan	20 August 2022	
DF	(Poland) Bartosz Bereszyński	(Italy) Sampdoria	Loan	7 January 2023	
GK	(Italy) Pierluigi Gollini	(Italy) Atalanta	Loan	25 January 2023	

=== Out ===
Pos.	Player	Transferred to	Fee	Date	Source
MF	(Italy) Lorenzo Insigne	(Canada) Toronto FC	Free	1 July 2022	
FW	(Poland) Arkadiusz Milik	(France) Marseille	€8M	1 July 2022	
DF	(Algeria) Faouzi Ghoulam	Unattached	Free	1 July 2022	
FW	(Belgium) Dries Mertens	(Turkey) Galatasaray	Free	1 July 2022	
GK	(Colombia) David Ospina	(Saudi Arabia) Al Nassr	Free	1 July 2022	
DF	(Senegal) Kalidou Koulibaly	(England) Chelsea	€38M	16 July 2022	
FW	(Italy) Andrea Petagna	(Italy) Monza	Loan	12 August 2022	
MF	(Spain) Fabián Ruiz	(France) Paris Saint-Germain	€25M	30 August 2022	
MF	(Algeria) Adam Ounas	(France) Lille	Undisclosed	1 September 2022	
DF	(Italy) Alessandro Zanoli	(Italy) Sampdoria	Loan	7 January 2023	
GK	(Italy) Salvatore Sirigu	(Italy) Fiorentina	Free	25 January 2023	

== Pre-season and friendlies ==
Win Draw Loss Fixtures

14 July 2022 Friendly	Napoli (Italy)	10–0	(Italy) Bassa Anaunia	Dimaro Folgarida, Italy
18:00 CEST (UTC+2)	Rrahmani 5'; Kvaratskhelia 27', 38'; Zambo Anguissa 34'; Zerbin 55'; Osimhen 68'; Politano 69', 87'; Fellini 73' (o.g.); Ambrosino 90+1'	Report		Stadium: Stadio di Carciato; Referee: Drigo di Portogruaro

17 July 2022 Friendly	Napoli (Italy)	4–1	(Italy) Perugia	Dimaro Folgarida, Italy
18:00 CEST (UTC+2)	Kvaratskhelia 5'; Zambo Anguissa 36'; Rrahmani (yellow card) 44'; Politano 63'; Petagna 90+1' (pen.)	Report	Onischenko (yellow card) 9'; Vulikić (yellow card) 32'; Melchiorri 48'	Stadium: Stadio di Carciato; Referee: Lorenzo Maggioni

27 July 2022 Friendly	Napoli (Italy)	2–2	(Turkey) Adana Demirspor	Castel di Sangro, Italy
20:30 CEST (UTC+2)	Lozano 56'; Çokçalış 90+3' (o.g.)	Report	Ndiaye (yellow card) 41'; Balotelli 74' (pen.); Sari 87' (pen.)	Stadium: Stadio Teofilo Patini; Referee: Giacomo Camplone (Italy)

31 July 2022 Friendly	Napoli (Italy)	1–1	(Spain) Mallorca	Castel di Sangro, Italy
20:30 CEST (UTC+2)	Osimhen 9' (pen.); Zambo Anguissa (yellow card) 79'	Report	Baba (yellow card) 39'; Raíllo 55'	Stadium: Stadio Teofilo Patini

3 August 2022 Friendly	Napoli (Italy)	3–1	(Spain) Girona	Castel di Sangro, Italy
20:30 CEST (UTC+2)	López 27' (o.g.); Petagna 77'; Kvaratskhelia 80' (pen.)	Report	Castellanos 56'	Stadium: Stadio Teofilo Patini; Referee: Juan Luca Sacchi (Italy)

6 August 2022 Friendly	Napoli (Italy)	0–0	(Spain) Espanyol	Castel di Sangro, Italy
20:30 CEST (UTC+2)	Osimhen (yellow card) 44'; Juan Jesus (yellow card) 82'; Demme (yellow card) 88'	Report	Gómez (yellow card) 44'; Vinícius (yellow card) 45'; Cabrera (yellow card) 45'; Oliván (yellow card) 79'; Villahermosa (yellow card) 90+3'	Stadium: Stadio Teofilo Patini; Referee: Gabriele Scatena (Italy)

24 August 2022 Friendly	Napoli (Italy)	3–0	(Italy) Juve Stabia	Naples, Italy
18:00 CEST (UTC+2)	Ndombele 57'; Ambrosino 81'; Zerbin 90'	Report	Ricci (yellow card) 19'	Stadium: Stadio Diego Armando Maradona; Attendance: 30,000; Referee: Mattia Pascarella

7 December 2022 Winter Football Series	Antalyaspor (Turkey)	2–3	(Italy) Napoli	Antalya, Turkey
20:45 TRT (UTC+3)	Mehmedi 55'; Özmert 86'	Report	Raspadori 8', 61'; Politano 14'	Stadium: Antalya Stadium; Referee: Feridun Daldas (Turkey)

11 December 2022 Winter Football Series	Napoli (Italy)	3–1	(England) Crystal Palace	Belek, Turkey
18:00 TRT (UTC+3)	Ndombele (yellow card) 21'; Osimhen 35'; Raspadori 65', 82'	Report	Zaha 33'; Eze (yellow card) 72'	Stadium: Regnum Carya; Referee: Raşit Yorgancılar (Turkey)

17 December 2022 Friendly	Napoli (Italy)	2–3	(Spain) Villarreal	Naples, Italy
20:30 CET (UTC+1)	Osimhen 14'; Kvaratskhelia 79' (pen.)	Report	Capoue 12'; Jackson 67'; Gerard 70'	Stadium: Stadio Diego Armando Maradona; Attendance: 24,600; Referee: Federico Dionisi (Italy)

21 December 2022 Friendly	Napoli (Italy)	1–4	(France) Lille	Naples, Italy
20:00 CET (UTC+1)	Mário Rui (yellow card) 68'; Raspadori (yellow card) 78', (goal) 90+3'	Report	Diakité 18'; David 63'; Ounas 78'; Bamba 82'	Stadium: Stadio Diego Armando Maradona; Attendance: 15,000; Referee: Fabio Maresca (Italy)

== Competitions ==
=== Overall record ===
Competition	First match	Last match	Starting round	Final position	Record							
Competition	First match	Last match	Starting round	Final position	Pld	W	D	L	GF	GA	GD	Win %
Serie A	15 August 2022	4 June 2023	Matchday 1	Winners	38	28	6	4	77	28	+49	73.68
Coppa Italia	17 January 2023		Round of 16	Round of 16	1	0	1	0	2	2	+0	0.00
UEFA Champions League	7 September 2022	18 April 2023	Group stage	Quarter-finals	10	7	1	2	26	8	+18	70.00
Total					49	35	8	6	105	38	+67	71.43

Source: Soccerway

=== Serie A ===
==== League table ====
Pos	Team	Pld	W	D	L	GF	GA	GD	Pts	Qualification or relegation
1	Napoli (C)	38	28	6	4	77	28	+49	90	Qualification for the Champions League group stage (Note: Should the first and second, or 17th and 18th-placed teams at the end of the season be tied on points, a play-off tiebreaker match was held at a neutral site to determine the title and final team relegated respectively.)
2	Lazio	38	22	8	8	60	30	+30	74	Qualification for the Champions League group stage
3	Inter Milan	38	23	3	12	71	42	+29	72	Qualification for the Champions League group stage
4	Milan	38	20	10	8	64	43	+21	70	Qualification for the Champions League group stage
5	Atalanta	38	19	7	12	66	48	+18	64	Qualification for the Europa League group stage (Note: Since the winners of the 2022–23 Coppa Italia, Inter Milan, qualified for the Champions League, the Europa League berth awarded to the Coppa Italia winners was passed to the sixth-placed team, and the Europa Conference League berth awarded to the sixth-placed team was passed to the seventh-placed team.)

Source: Serie A
Rules for classification: 1) Points; 2) Tiebreaker for Champions team and third relegated team; 3) Head-to-head points; 4) Head-to-head goal difference; 5) Goal difference; 6) Goals scored; 7) Draw. (Note: Head-to-head record is used only after all the matches between the teams in question have been played)
(C) Champions

==== Results summary ====
Overall								Home						Away					
Pld	W	D	L	GF	GA	GD	Pts	W	D	L	GF	GA	GD	W	D	L	GF	GA	GD
38	28	6	4	77	28	+49	90	14	3	2	40	15	+25	14	3	2	37	13	+24

Source: Serie A

==== Results by round ====
Round	1	2	3	4	5	6	7	8	9	10	11	12	13	14	15	16	17	18	19	20	21	22	23	24	25	26	27	28	29	30	31	32	33	34	35	36	37	38
Ground	A	H	A	H	A	H	A	H	A	H	A	H	A	H	H	A	A	H	A	H	A	H	A	A	H	H	A	H	A	H	A	H	A	H	A	H	A	H
Result	W	W	D	D	W	W	W	W	W	W	W	W	W	W	W	L	W	W	W	W	W	W	W	W	L	W	W	L	W	D	W	D	D	W	L	W	D	W
Position	1	1	1	4	2	1	1	1	1	1	1	1	1	1	1	1	1	1	1	1	1	1	1	1	1	1	1	1	1	1	1	1	1	1	1	1	1	1

Source: Serie A
A = Away; H = Home; W = Win; D = Draw; L = Loss

==== Matches ====
The league fixtures were announced on 24 June 2022.

15 August 2022 1	Hellas Verona	2–5	Napoli	Verona
18:30 CEST (UTC+2)	Lasagna 29'; Hongla (yellow card) 45+1'; Henry 48'; Amione (yellow card) 52'	Report	Kvaratskhelia 37'; Osimhen 45+3', (yellow card) 54'; Zieliński 55'; Lobotka 65'; Politano 79'; Kim (yellow card) 90+3'	Stadium: Stadio Marcantonio Bentegodi; Attendance: 16,967; Referee: Michael Fabbri

21 August 2022 2	Napoli	4–0	Monza	Naples
18:30 CEST (UTC+2)	Kvaratskhelia 35', 62'; Osimhen 45+2'; Mário Rui (yellow card) 59'; Di Lorenzo (yellow card) 73'; Kim 90+3'	Report	Caprari (yellow card) 38'	Stadium: Stadio Diego Armando Maradona; Attendance: 36,559; Referee: Francesco Fourneau

28 August 2022 3	Fiorentina	0–0	Napoli	Florence
20:45 CEST (UTC+2)	Martínez Quarta (yellow card) 60'; Jović (yellow card) 68'	Report	Zambo Anguissa (yellow card) 3'; Raspadori (yellow card) 90'; Ndombele (yellow card) 90+3'	Stadium: Stadio Artemio Franchi; Attendance: 32,000; Referee: Livio Marinelli

31 August 2022 4	Napoli	1–1	Lecce	Naples
20:45 CEST (UTC+2)	Politano (yellow card) 13'; Elmas 27'	Report	Colombo (penalty missed) 25', 31', (yellow card) 40'; Hjulmand (yellow card) 33'; Gendrey (yellow card) 90+7'; Gonzàlez (yellow card) 90+7'	Stadium: Stadio Diego Armando Maradona; Attendance: 37,573; Referee: Matteo Marcenaro

3 September 2022 5	Lazio	1–2	Napoli	Rome
20:45 CEST (UTC+2)	Zaccagni 4'; Milinković-Savić (yellow card) 67'; Cataldi (yellow card) 70'; Felipe Anderson (yellow card) 70'; Marušić (yellow card) 90+4'	Report	Kim 38'; Kvaratskhelia 61'	Stadium: Stadio Olimpico; Attendance: 39,000; Referee: Simone Sozza

10 September 2022 6	Napoli	1–0	Spezia	Naples
15:00 CEST (UTC+2)	Elmas (yellow card) 71'; Raspadori 89'	Report	Gyasi (yellow card) 45'; Drągowski (yellow card) 77'	Stadium: Stadio Diego Armando Maradona; Attendance: 35,000; Referee: Alberto Santoro

18 September 2022 7	Milan	1–2	Napoli	Milan
20:45 CEST (UTC+2)	Kjær (yellow card) 18'; Calabria (yellow card) 45'; Krunić (yellow card) 53'; Giroud 69'; Tomori (yellow card) 74'	Report	Politano 55' (pen.); Rrahmani (yellow card) 63'; Simeone (yellow card) 71', (goal) 78'; Zerbin (yellow card) 87'	Stadium: San Siro; Attendance: 72,573; Referee: Maurizio Mariani

1 October 2022 8	Napoli	3–1	Torino	Naples
15:00 CEST (UTC+2)	Zambo Anguissa 6', 12'; Kvaratskhelia 37'	Report	Sanabria 44'; Singo (yellow card) 70'; Lukić (yellow card) 74'	Stadium: Stadio Diego Armando Maradona; Attendance: 35,953; Referee: Luca Massimi

9 October 2022 9	Cremonese	1–4	Napoli	Cremona
18:00 CEST (UTC+2)	Zanimacchia (yellow card) 17'; Dessers 47'; Sernicola (yellow card) 69'	Report	Politano 26' (pen.); Simeone 76'; Lozano 90+3'; Olivera 90+5'	Stadium: Stadio Giovanni Zini; Attendance: 14,238; Referee: Rosario Abisso

16 October 2022 10	Napoli	3–2	Bologna	Naples
18:00 CEST (UTC+2)	Juan Jesus 45'; Lozano 49'; Osimhen 69'	Report	Domínguez (yellow card) 21'; Zirkzee 41'; Barrow 51'; Skorupski (yellow card) 58'; Sansone (yellow card) 90+1'; Lykogiannis (yellow card) 90+3'	Stadium: Stadio Diego Armando Maradona; Attendance: 45,599; Referee: Francesco Cosso

23 October 2022 11	Roma	0–1	Napoli	Rome
20:45 CEST (UTC+2)	Smalling (yellow card) 22'; Cristante (yellow card) 51'; Ibañez (yellow card) 74'	Report	Lozano (yellow card) 45+3'; Ndombele (yellow card) 47'; Olivera (yellow card) 78'; Lobotka (yellow card) 79'; Osimhen 80'	Stadium: Stadio Olimpico; Attendance: 61,633; Referee: Massimiliano Irrati

29 October 2022 12	Napoli	4–0	Sassuolo	Naples
15:00 CEST (UTC+2)	Osimhen 4', 19', 77'; Kvaratskhelia 36'	Report	Lopez (yellow card) 75'; Laurienté (yellow card) 76' (yellow-red card) 84'	Stadium: Stadio Diego Armando Maradona; Attendance: 47,156; Referee: Antonio Rapuano

5 November 2022 13	Atalanta	1–2	Napoli	Bergamo
18:00 CET (UTC+1)	Lookman 19' (pen.); Demiral (yellow card) 36'; Højlund (yellow card) 58'; Mæhle (yellow card) 90+2'; Tolói (yellow card) 90+3'; Zapata (yellow card) 90+4'	Report	Osimhen 23'; Elmas 35'; Kim (yellow card) 57'	Stadium: Gewiss Stadium; Attendance: 19,363; Referee: Maurizio Mariani

8 November 2022 14	Napoli	2–0	Empoli	Naples
18:30 CET (UTC+1)	Østigård (yellow card) 57'; Lozano 69' (pen.); Zieliński 88'	Report	Bandinelli (yellow card) 15'; Satriano (yellow card) 22'; Luperto (yellow card) 39' (yellow-red card) 74'; Parisi (yellow card) 61'; Henderson (yellow card) 90'	Stadium: Stadio Diego Armando Maradona; Attendance: 40,000; Referee: Luca Pairetto

12 November 2022 15	Napoli	3–2	Udinese	Naples
15:00 CET (UTC+1)	Osimhen 15'; Juan Jesus (yellow card) 25'; Zieliński 31'; Elmas 58'; Mário Rui (yellow card) 78'	Report	Walace (yellow card) 27'; Pereyra (yellow card) 37'; Nestorovski 79'; Samardžić 82'; Ebosse (yellow card) 84'	Stadium: Stadio Diego Armando Maradona; Attendance: 51,000; Referee: Giovanni Ayroldi

4 January 2023 16	Internazionale	1–0	Napoli	Milan
20:45 CET (UTC+1)	Džeko (yellow card) 27', (goal) 56'; Barella (yellow card) 84'; Dumfries (yellow card) 87'	Report	Di Lorenzo (yellow card) 85'; Kim (yellow card) 88'	Stadium: San Siro; Attendance: 75,479; Referee: Simone Sozza

8 January 2023 17	Sampdoria	0–2	Napoli	Genoa
18:00 CET (UTC+1)	Murru (yellow card) 5'; Rincón (red card) 38'; Murillo (yellow card) 44'; Léris (yellow card) 72'	Report	Politano (penalty missed) 6'; Osimhen 19'; Juan Jesus (yellow card) 53'; Zambo Anguissa (yellow card) 60'; Elmas 82' (pen.)	Stadium: Stadio Luigi Ferraris; Attendance: 24,490; Referee: Rosario Abisso

13 January 2023 18	Napoli	5–1	Juventus	Naples
20:45 CET (UTC+1)	Osimhen 14', 65'; Kvaratskhelia 39'; Rrahmani 55'; Elmas 72'	Report	Di María 42'; Danilo (yellow card) 44'	Stadium: Stadio Diego Armando Maradona; Attendance: 52,000; Referee: Daniele Doveri

21 January 2023 19	Salernitana	0–2	Napoli	Salerno
18:00 CET (UTC+1)	Bradarić (yellow card) 75'; Pirola (yellow card) 78'	Report	Kim (yellow card) 44'; Di Lorenzo 45+3'; Osimhen 48'; Ndombele (yellow card) 90+4'	Stadium: Stadio Arechi; Attendance: 18,550; Referee: Daniele Chiffi

29 January 2023 20	Napoli	2–1	Roma	Naples
20:45 CET (UTC+1)	Osimhen 17', (yellow card) 68'; Simeone 86'	Report	Dybala (yellow card) 33'; El Shaarawy (yellow card) 70', (goal) 75'	Stadium: Stadio Diego Armando Maradona; Attendance: 50,000; Referee: Daniele Orsato

5 February 2023 21	Spezia	0–3	Napoli	La Spezia
12:30 CET (UTC+1)	Ampadu (yellow card) 16'; Caldara (yellow card) 50'; Reca (yellow card) 85'	Report	Lozano (yellow card) 19'; Kvaratskhelia 47' (pen.); Zieliński (yellow card) 52'; Osimhen 68', 73'	Stadium: Stadio Alberto Picco; Attendance: 10,000; Referee: Marco Di Bello

12 February 2023 22	Napoli	3–0	Cremonese	Naples
20:45 CET (UTC+1)	Kvaratskhelia 21'; Osimhen 65'; Elmas 79'	Report	Vásquez (yellow card) 13'; Aiwu (yellow card) 74'	Stadium: Stadio Diego Armando Maradona; Attendance: 50,250; Referee: Luca Massimi

17 February 2023 23	Sassuolo	0–2	Napoli	Reggio Emilia
20:45 CET (UTC+1)	Laurienté (yellow card) 43'; Lopez (yellow card) 81'	Report	Kvaratskhelia 12'; Osimhen 33'; Elmas (yellow card) 53'; Zieliński (yellow card) 68'	Stadium: Mapei Stadium – Città del Tricolore; Attendance: 15,911; Referee: Andrea Colombo

25 February 2023 24	Empoli	0–2	Napoli	Empoli
18:00 CET (UTC+1)	Henderson (yellow card) 25'; Grassi (yellow card) 62'	Report	Ismajli 17' (o.g.); Osimhen 28'; Lozano (yellow card) 63'; Mário Rui (red card) 67'	Stadium: Stadio Carlo Castellani; Attendance: 12,624; Referee: Giovanni Ayroldi

3 March 2023 25	Napoli	0–1	Lazio	Naples
20:45 CET (UTC+1)	Osimhen (yellow card) 63'; Elmas (yellow card) 89'	Report	Patric (yellow card) 21'; Vecino 67'; Marušić (yellow card) 90+4'	Stadium: Stadio Diego Armando Maradona; Attendance: 54,000; Referee: Luca Pairetto

11 March 2023 26	Napoli	2–0	Atalanta	Naples
18:00 CET (UTC+1)	Osimhen (yellow card) 18'; Kvaratskhelia 60'; Rrahmani 77'	Report	Ruggeri (yellow card) 15'; Scalvini (yellow card) 30'	Stadium: Stadio Diego Armando Maradona; Attendance: 50,601; Referee: Andrea Colombo

19 March 2023 27	Torino	0–4	Napoli	Turin
15:00 CET (UTC+1)	Gravillon (yellow card) 20'	Report	Osimhen 9', 51'; Kvaratskhelia 35' (pen.); Ndombele 68', (yellow card) 69'	Stadium: Stadio Olimpico Grande Torino; Attendance: 26,058; Referee: Matteo Marchetti

2 April 2023 28	Napoli	0–4	Milan	Naples
20:45 CEST (UTC+2)	Lobotka (yellow card) 40'	Report	Leão 17', 59'; Brahim 25'; Giroud (yellow card) 35'; Krunić (yellow card) 63'; Saelemaekers 67'	Stadium: Stadio Diego Armando Maradona; Attendance: 50,000; Referee: Antonio Rapuano

7 April 2023 29	Lecce	1–2	Napoli	Lecce
19:00 CEST (UTC+2)	Di Francesco 52'; Gendrey (yellow card) 62'; Umtiti (yellow card) 86'	Report	Di Lorenzo 18'; Gallo 64' (o.g.); Ndombele (yellow card) 72'	Stadium: Stadio Via del mare Attendance: 25,799; Referee: Gianluca Manganiello

15 April 2023 30	Napoli	0–0	Hellas Verona	Naples
18:00 CEST (UTC+2)	Kvaratskhelia (yellow card) 90+1'	Report	Ceccherini (yellow card) 14'; Terracciano (yellow card) 78'; Dawidowicz (yellow card) 90'; Verdi (yellow card) 90+4'	Stadium: Stadio Diego Armando Maradona; Attendance: 39,216; Referee: Federico La Penna

23 April 2023 31	Juventus	0–1	Napoli	Turin
20:45 CEST (UTC+2)	Locatelli (yellow card) 23'; Rabiot (yellow card) 40'; Fagioli (yellow card) 85'; Di María (yellow card) 89'	Report	Raspadori 90+3'; Zambo Anguissa (yellow card) 90+8'	Stadium: Juventus Stadium; Attendance: 39,839; Referee: Michael Fabbri

30 April 2023 32	Napoli	1–1	Salernitana	Naples
15:00 CEST (UTC+2)	Zieliński (yellow card) 55'; Olivera 62', (yellow card) 71'	Report	Daniliuc (yellow card) 74'; Pirola (yellow card) 75'; Dia 84'	Stadium: Stadio Diego Armando Maradona; Attendance: 50,672; Referee: Matteo Marcenaro

4 May 2023 33	Udinese	1–1	Napoli	Udine
20:45 CEST (UTC+2)	Lovrić 13'; Ehizibue (yellow card) 17'	Report	Osimhen 52'	Stadium: Stadio Friuli; Attendance: 24,911; Referee: Rosario Abisso

7 May 2023 34	Napoli	1–0	Fiorentina	Naples
18:00 CEST (UTC+2)	Osimhen (penalty missed) 48', 74' (pen.)	Report		Stadium: Stadio Diego Armando Maradona; Attendance: 50,719; Referee: Matteo Marchetti

14 May 2023 35	Monza	2–0	Napoli	Monza
15:00 CEST (UTC+2)	Mota 18'; Caldirola (yellow card) 23'; Petagna 54'	Report	Elmas (yellow card) 53'	Stadium: Stadio Brianteo; Attendance: 14,455; Referee: Francesco Cosso

21 May 2023 36	Napoli	3–1	Internazionale	Naples
18:00 CEST (UTC+2)	Elmas (yellow card) 64'; Zambo Anguissa 67'; Di Lorenzo 85'; Gaetano 90+4'	Report	Gagliardini (yellow card) 19' (yellow-red card) 41'; Lukaku 82'	Stadium: Stadio Diego Armando Maradona; Attendance: 50,653; Referee: Livio Marinelli

28 May 2023 37	Bologna	2–2	Napoli	Bologna
15:00 CEST (UTC+2)	Ferguson 63'; Domínguez (yellow card) 67'; De Silvestri 84'	Report	Osimhen 14', 54'; Kim (yellow card) 39'; Rrahmani (yellow card) 66'; Bereszyński (yellow card) 80'	Stadium: Stadio Renato Dall'Ara; Attendance: 27,209; Referee: Matteo Marceenaro

4 June 2023 38	Napoli	2–0	Sampdoria	Naples
18:30 CEST (UTC+2)	Osimhen 64' (pen.); Simeone 85'	Report	Murru (yellow card) 63'	Stadium: Stadio Diego Armando Maradona; Attendance: 51,000; Referee: Ermanno Feliciani

=== Coppa Italia ===
17 January 2023 Round of 16	Napoli	2–2 (a.e.t.) (4–5 p)	Cremonese	Naples
21:00 CET (UTC+1)	Juan Jesus 33', (yellow card) 90+2'; Simeone 36'; Zerbin (yellow card) 61'	Report	Pickel 18'; Vásquez (yellow card) 29'; Okereke (yellow card) 45+5'; Quagliata (yellow card) 59'; Afena-Gyan 87'; Meïté (yellow card) 90+3'; Sernicola (yellow card) 90+7' (yellow-red card) 100'; Valeri (yellow card) 93'	Stadium: Stadio Diego Armando Maradona; Attendance: 32,000; Referee: Maria Sole Ferrieri Caputi
	Penalties
	Politano (penalty scored); Simeone (penalty scored); Zieliński (penalty scored); Lobotka (penalty missed); Osimhen (penalty scored)		(penalty scored) Vásquez; (penalty scored) Buonaiuto; (penalty scored) Tsadjout; (penalty scored) Valeri; (penalty scored) Afena-Gyan

=== UEFA Champions League ===
==== Group stage ====
The draw for the group stage was held on 25 August 2022.

Pos	Team	Pld	W	D	L	GF	GA	GD	Pts	Qualification	NAP	LIV	AJX	RAN
1	(Italy) Napoli	6	5	0	1	20	6	+14	15 (Note: Tied on head-to-head points. Head-to-head goal difference: Napoli +1, Liverpool −1.)	Advance to knockout phase	—	4–1	4–2	3–0
2	(England) Liverpool	6	5	0	1	17	6	+11	15	Advance to knockout phase	2–0	—	2–1	2–0
3	(Netherlands) Ajax	6	2	0	4	11	16	−5	6	Transfer to Europa League	1–6	0–3	—	4–0
4	(Scotland) Rangers	6	0	0	6	2	22	−20	0		0–3	1–7	1–3	—

Source: UEFA
Rules for classification: Group stage tiebreakers
Notes:

7 September 2022 1	Napoli (Italy)	4–1	(England) Liverpool	Naples
21:00 CEST (UTC+2)	Zieliński 5' (pen.), 47'; Osimhen (penalty missed) 19'; Zambo Anguissa 31'; Simeone 44'; Rrahmani (yellow card) 66'	Report	Milner (yellow card) 10'; Van Dijk (yellow card) 18'; Díaz 49'	Stadium: Stadio Diego Armando Maradona; Attendance: 51,793; Referee: Carlos del Cerro Grande (Spain)

14 September 2022 2	Rangers (Scotland)	0–3	(Italy) Napoli	Glasgow, Scotland
21:00 CEST (UTC+2)	Morelos (yellow card) 21'; Lundstram (yellow card) 35'; Sands (yellow card) 53' (yellow-red card) 55'; Barišić (yellow card) 67'; Tavernier (yellow card) 74'	Report	Politano (yellow card) 42', (goal) 68' (pen.); Zieliński (penalty missed) 60'; Raspadori 85'; Ndombele 90+1'	Stadium: Ibrox Stadium; Attendance: 50,121; Referee: Antonio Mateu Lahoz (Spain)
Note: The match was originally scheduled to be played on 13 September 2022, but was rescheduled to the following day at the same time due to conditions related to the death of Elizabeth II.

4 October 2022 3	Ajax (Netherlands)	1–6	(Italy) Napoli	Amsterdam, Netherlands
21:00 CEST (UTC+2)	Kudus 9', (yellow card) 90+2'; Timber (yellow card) 30'; Tadić (yellow card) 38' (yellow-red card) 73'	Report	Raspadori 18', 47', (yellow card) 21'; Di Lorenzo 33'; Zieliński 45'; Kvaratskhelia 63'; Simeone 81'	Stadium: Johan Cruyff Arena; Attendance: 52,896; Referee: François Letexier (France)

12 October 2022 4	Napoli (Italy)	4–2	(Netherlands) Ajax	Naples
18:45 CEST (UTC+2)	Lozano 4'; Raspadori 16'; Kvaratskhelia 62' (pen.); Juan Jesus (yellow card) 87'; Osimhen 90', (yellow card) 90'; Politano (yellow card) 90+2'	Report	Taylor (yellow card) 27'; Sánchez (yellow card) 33'; Klaassen 49'; Álvarez (yellow card) 52'; Timber (yellow card) 61'; Bassey (yellow card) 66'; Bergwijn (yellow card) 76', (goal) 83' (pen.)	Stadium: Stadio Diego Armando Maradona; Attendance: 52,229; Referee: Felix Zwayer (Germany)

26 October 2022 5	Napoli (Italy)	3–0	(Scotland) Rangers	Naples
21:00 CEST (UTC+2)	Simeone 11', 16'; Østigård 80'; Kim (yellow card) 88'; Mário Rui (yellow card) 90'	Report	Davies (yellow card) 9'; Lundstram (yellow card) 42'	Stadium: Stadio Diego Armando Maradona; Attendance: 39,835; Referee: Halil Umut Meler (Turkey)

1 November 2022 6	Liverpool (England)	2–0	(Italy) Napoli	Liverpool, England
21:00 CET (UTC+1)	Konaté (yellow card) 36'; Alexander-Arnold (yellow card) 73'; Salah 85'; Núñez (yellow card) 90+4', (goal) 90+8'	Report		Stadium: Anfield; Attendance: 52,077; Referee: Tobias Stieler (Germany)

==== Knockout phase ====
===== Round of 16 =====
The round of 16 draw was held on 7 November 2022.

21 February 2023 First leg	Eintracht Frankfurt (Germany)	0–2	(Italy) Napoli	Frankfurt, Germany
21:00 CET (UTC+1)	Kolo Muani (red card) 58'; Götze (yellow card) 60'	Report	Kvaratskhelia (penalty missed) 36'; Kim (yellow card) 38'; Osimhen 40'; Di Lorenzo 65'; Elmas (yellow card) 83'	Stadium: Waldstadion; Attendance: 47,500; Referee: Artur Soares Dias (Portugal)

15 March 2023 Second leg	Napoli (Italy)	3–0 (5–0 agg.)	(Germany) Eintracht Frankfurt	Naples
21:00 CET (UTC+1)	Osimhen 45+2', 53'; Zieliński 64' (pen.); Juan Jesus (yellow card) 77'	Report	Ndicka (yellow card) 26'; Lenz (yellow card) 32'; Götze (yellow card) 65'	Stadium: Stadio Diego Armando Maradona; Attendance: 49,082; Referee: Anthony Taylor (England)

===== Quarter-finals =====
The quarter-finals draw was held on 17 March 2023.

12 April 2023 First leg	Milan (Italy)	1–0	(Italy) Napoli	Milan
21:00 CEST (UTC+2)	Bennacer 40', (yellow card) 60'; Saelemaekers (yellow card) 90+3'; Calabria (yellow card) 90+6'	Report	Zieliński (yellow card) 38'; Di Lorenzo (yellow card) 70'; Zambo Anguissa (yellow card) 70' (yellow-red card) 74'; Kim (yellow card) 78'; Rrahmani (yellow card) 90+3'	Stadium: San Siro; Attendance: 74,742; Referee: István Kovács (Romania)

18 April 2023 Second leg	Napoli (Italy)	1–1 (1–2 agg.)	(Italy) Milan	Naples
21:00 CEST (UTC+2)	Di Lorenzo (yellow card) 45+7'; Kvaratskhelia (penalty missed) 82'; Osimhen 90+3'; Olivera (yellow card) 90+3'	Report	Giroud (penalty missed) 22', 43'; Hernandez (yellow card) 45+1'; Maignan (yellow card) 45+6'	Stadium: Stadio Diego Armando Maradona; Attendance: 52,728; Referee: Szymon Marciniak (Poland)

== Statistics ==
=== Appearances and goals ===
Last updated on 4 June 2023

No.	Pos	Nat	Player	Total		Serie A		Coppa Italia		Champions League	
No.	Pos	Nat	Player	Apps	Goals	Apps	Goals	Apps	Goals	Apps	Goals
Goalkeepers
1	GK	(Italy) ITA	Alex Meret	45	0	34	0	1	0	10	0
12	GK	(Italy) ITA	Davide Marfella	0	0	0	0	0	0	0	0
16	GK	(Poland) POL	Hubert Idasiak	0	0	0	0	0	0	0	0
95	GK	(Italy) ITA	Pierluigi Gollini	4	0	4	0	0	0	0	0
Defenders
3	DF	(South Korea) KOR	Kim Min-jae	45	2	35	2	0+1	0	9	0
5	DF	(Brazil) BRA	Juan Jesus	19	2	10+5	1	1	1	2+1	0
6	DF	(Portugal) POR	Mário Rui	28	0	21+1	0	0	0	5+1	0
13	DF	(Kosovo) KOS	Amir Rrahmani	36	2	27+2	2	0	0	7	0
17	DF	(Uruguay) URU	Mathías Olivera	39	2	17+13	2	1	0	5+3	0
19	DF	(Poland) POL	Bartosz Bereszyński	4	0	2+1	0	1	0	0	0
22	DF	(Italy) ITA	Giovanni Di Lorenzo	47	5	36+1	3	0	0	10	2
55	DF	(Norway) NOR	Leo Skiri Østigård	11	1	4+3	0	1	0	2+1	1
Midfielders
4	MF	(Germany) GER	Diego Demme	7	0	2+5	0	0	0	0	0
7	MF	(North Macedonia) MKD	Eljif Elmas	47	6	14+22	6	1	0	2+8	0
20	MF	(Poland) POL	Piotr Zieliński	48	7	27+10	3	0+1	0	8+2	4
31	MF	(Algeria) ALG	Karim Zedadka	3	0	0+3	0	0	0	0	0
68	MF	(Slovakia) SVK	Stanislav Lobotka	49	1	34+4	1	0+1	0	10	0
70	MF	(Italy) ITA	Gianluca Gaetano	12	1	0+8	1	1	0	0+3	0
91	MF	(France) FRA	Tanguy Ndombele	40	2	8+22	1	1	0	3+6	1
99	MF	(Cameroon) CMR	André-Frank Zambo Anguissa	45	4	36	3	0+1	0	8	1
Forwards
9	FW	(Nigeria) NGR	Victor Osimhen	39	31	30+2	26	0+1	0	5+1	5
11	FW	(Mexico) MEX	Hirving Lozano	41	4	20+12	3	0	0	4+5	1
18	FW	(Argentina) ARG	Giovanni Simeone	33	9	1+24	4	1	1	2+5	4
21	FW	(Italy) ITA	Matteo Politano	37	4	14+13	3	0+1	0	6+3	1
23	FW	(Italy) ITA	Alessio Zerbin	14	0	2+8	0	1	0	0+3	0
77	FW	(Georgia (country)) GEO	Khvicha Kvaratskhelia	43	14	30+4	12	0	0	9	2
81	FW	(Italy) ITA	Giacomo Raspadori	33	6	10+15	2	1	0	3+4	4
Players transferred out during the season
30	GK	(Italy) ITA	Salvatore Sirigu	0	0	0	0	0	0	0	0
33	FW	(Algeria) ALG	Adam Ounas	2	0	0+2	0	0	0	0	0
59	DF	(Italy) ITA	Alessandro Zanoli	3	0	0+1	0	0	0	0+2	0

Source: Competitions
