= Adam Ounas =

Footballer (born 1996)

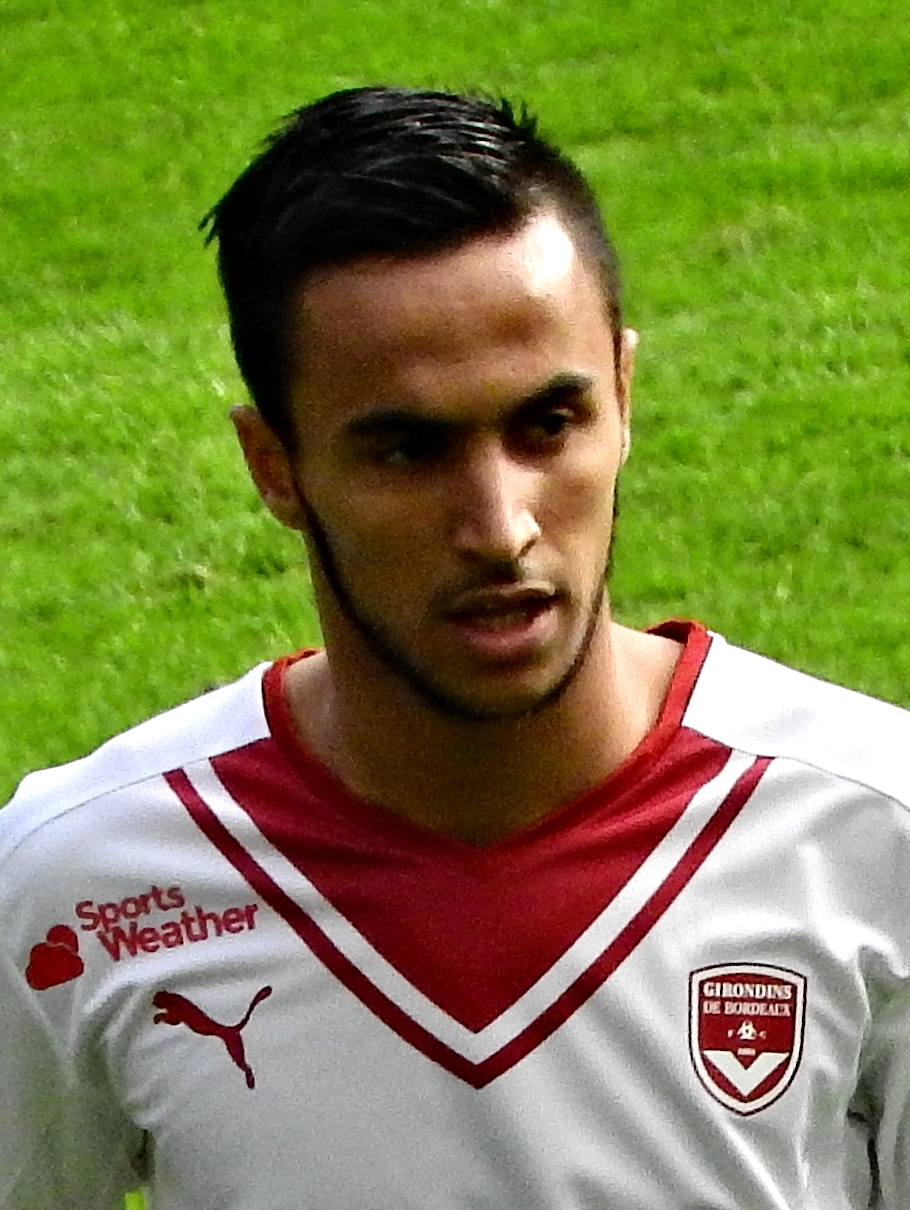
- Ounas with Bordeaux in 2016

Personal information
- Full name: Adam Mohamed Ounas
- Date of birth: 11 November 1996 (age 30)
- Place of birth: Chambray-lès-Tours, France
- Height: 1.72 m (5 ft 8 in)
- Positions: Right winger; attacking midfielder

Team information
- Current team: Al-Gharafa SC
- Number: 96

Youth career
- 2003–2011: Tours
- 2011–2012: FC de l'Ouest Tourangeau 37
- 2012: SC Tours Nord
- 2012–2013: FC de l'Ouest Tourangeau 37

Senior career*
Years	Team	Apps	(Gls)
2013–2015	Bordeaux B	21	(3)
2015–2017	Bordeaux	49	(8)
2017–2022	Napoli	42	(3)
2019–2020	→ Nice (loan)	16	(2)
2020–2021	→ Cagliari (loan)	7	(0)
2021	→ Crotone (loan)	15	(4)
2022–2024	Lille	38	(2)
2024–2025	Al Sadd	0	(0)
2025–2026	Al-Sailiya	8	(1)
2026	Al-Shamal	9	(2)
2026–	Al-Gharafa SC	0	(0)

International career^{‡}
2015–2016	France U20	2	(1)
2017–	Algeria	31	(5)
Medal record
Men's football
Representing Algeria
Africa Cup of Nations
Winner	2019 Egypt
- * Club domestic league appearances and goals as of 27 April 2026 ‡ National team caps and goals as of 3 December 2025

Adam Mohamed Ounas (Arabic: آدم أوناس; born 11 November 1996) is a professional footballer who plays as a right winger or attacking midfielder. Born in France, he plays for the Algeria national team.

== Club career ==
=== Early career ===
Ounas was four years old when he joined the local club Tours encouraged by his father, Hadji Ounas, a former goalkeeper. He played for Tours for ten years before joining the U14 youth team of Châteauroux.

One year later, due to juvenile mistakes, he left Châteauroux and played for a small local club, Football Club Ouest Tourangeau 37, where Arnaud Vaillant, scout for Bordeaux and Yannick Stopyra discovered him.

=== Bordeaux ===
In April 2013, Ounas joined Bordeaux on a one-year contract and in April 2014, he signed a two-year trainee contract.

Ounas made his first-team debut for Bordeaux on 4 October 2015, being introduced in the 72nd minute and scoring the last goal in his club's 3–2 defeat away to Lorient. He started in the following match against Montpellier, before being substituted in the 59th minute, and was introduced in the 77th minute of Bordeaux's 0–1 defeat to Sion in the Europa League on 22 October. On 25 October, Ounas scored his second Ligue 1 goal 11 minutes after having come on in the 67th minute, helping his club to a 1–0 win over Troyes AC. In December, Bordeaux rewarded him with a professional contract running until June 2019.

=== Napoli ===
On 3 July 2017, Napoli confirmed the signing of Ounas from Bordeaux. He scored his first goal for the club in a 1–3 loss to RB Leipzig in the Europa League 1st knockout round first leg.

==== Loan to Nice ====
On 30 August 2019, Ounas moved to Ligue 1 side OGC Nice, on a loan deal with a purchase option. On 6 May 2020, Nice decided not to trigger the purchase option and Ounas returned to Napoli.

==== Loan to Cagliari ====
On 6 October 2020, Ounas joined Serie A side Cagliari on a season-long loan with an option to buy. On 28 January 2021, Ounas parted ways with Cagliari due to lack of playing time.

==== Loan to Crotone ====
On 1 February 2021, Ounas joined Italian club Crotone on a loan deal. He scored his first goal for the club on 14 February in a 2–1 home loss to Sassuolo. His second marker came against Torino on 7 March; following the match, he became the target of cyber racism, allegedly from Torino fans, which included direct messages on Instagram, of which he published screenshots, calling him a "monkey", telling him to "return to Africa", and even hoping for his death.

=== Lille ===
On 1 September 2022, Ounas signed with Lille for two seasons, with an option for a third season. As his contract ended, it was not renewed and he was linked to a move to Greek club Olympiacos.

=== Al-Sadd SC ===
Ounas rejected the offer of Olympiacos and joined Qatar Stars League Club Al Sadd SC.

=== Al-Sailiya SC ===
On 12 September 2025, Ounas joined Qatar Stars League Club Al-Sailiya.

=== Al-Shamal SC ===
On 14 January 2026, Ounas joined Qatar Stars League Club Al-Shamal.

== International career ==
Born in France to Algerian parents, Ounas is eligible to represent both countries internationally because he holds both nationality. After initially playing for the France under-20 team, he opted to change his allegiance to Algeria in October 2016. Shortly after the switch, Ounas was called up to the Algeria national team for the first time for a 2018 World Cup qualifier against Nigeria.

Ounas made his debut for the senior Algeria in a 1–0 2018 FIFA World Cup qualification loss to Zambia on 5 September 2017.

Ounas opened his scoring record For Algeria on 1 July 2019, scoring twice against Tanzania in a 3–0 victory in the 2019 Africa Cup of Nations.

In December 2023, he was named in Algeria's squad for the 2023 Africa Cup of Nations.

== Career statistics ==
=== Club ===
As of match played 5 April 2024

Appearances and goals by club, season and competition
Club	Season	League			National cup		League cup		Continental		Total	
Club	Season	Division	Apps	Goals	Apps	Goals	Apps	Goals	Apps	Goals	Apps	Goals
Bordeaux	2015–16	Ligue 1	23	5	2	0	3	1	2	0	30	6
Bordeaux	2016–17	Ligue 1	26	3	2	0	2	1	—		30	4
Bordeaux	Total		49	8	4	0	5	2	2	0	60	10
Napoli	2017–18	Serie A	7	0	2	0	—		4	1	13	1
Napoli	2018–19	Serie A	18	3	2	0	—		6	1	26	4
Napoli	2021–22	Serie A	15	0	0	0	—		6	2	21	2
Napoli	2022–23	Serie A	2	0	0	0	—		0	0	2	0
Napoli	Total		42	3	4	0	—		16	4	62	7
Nice (loan)	2019–20	Ligue 1	16	2	3	2	0	0	—		19	4
Cagliari (loan)	2020–21	Serie A	7	0	3	0	—		—		10	0
Crotone (loan)	2020–21	Serie A	15	4	0	0	—		—		15	4
Lille	2022–23	Ligue 1	21	1	1	0	—		—		22	1
Lille	2023–24	Ligue 1	17	1	1	0	—		4 (Note: Appearances in UEFA Europa Conference League)	0	22	1
Lille	Total		38	2	2	0	—		4	0	44	2
Career total			167	19	16	2	5	2	22	4	210	27

=== International ===
As of match played 3 December 2025

Appearances and goals by national team and year
National team	Year	Apps	Goals
Algeria	2017	1	0
Algeria	2018	2	0
Algeria	2019	6	3
Algeria	2020	2	0
Algeria	2021	4	1
Algeria	2022	6	1
Algeria	2023	2	0
Algeria	2024	4	0
Algeria	2025	1	0
Total		28	5

Scores and results list Algeria's goal tally first, score column indicates score after each Ounas goal.

List of international goals scored by Adam Ounas
No.	Date	Venue	Opponent	Score	Result	Competition
1	1 July 2019	Al Salam Stadium, Cairo, Egypt	Tanzania	1–0	3–0	2019 Africa Cup of Nations
2	1 July 2019	Al Salam Stadium, Cairo, Egypt	Tanzania	2–0	3–0	2019 Africa Cup of Nations
3	7 July 2019	30 June Stadium, Cairo, Egypt	Guinea	3–0	3–0	2019 Africa Cup of Nations
4	3 June 2021	Mustapha Tchaker Stadium, Blida, Algeria	Mauritania	3–0	4–1	Friendly
5	5 January 2022	Education City Stadium, Doha, Qatar	Ghana	1–0	3–0	Friendly

== Honours ==
Napoli

- Serie A: 2022–23

Algeria

- Africa Cup of Nations: 2019
