= Alessio Zerbin =

Italian footballer (born 1999)

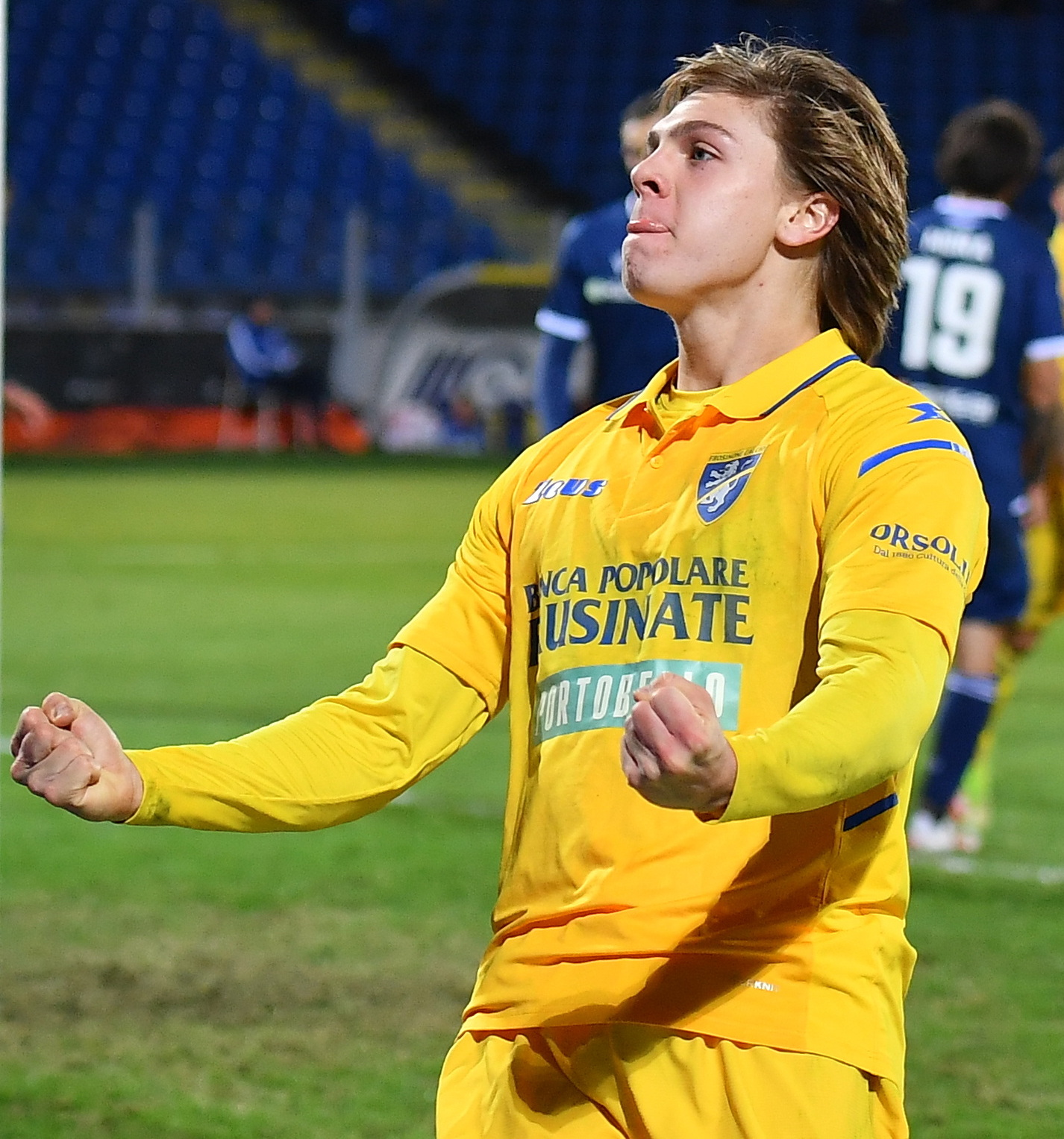
- Zerbin with Frosinone in 2021

Personal information
- Date of birth: 3 March 1999 (age 27)
- Place of birth: Novara, Italy
- Height: 1.82 m (6 ft 0 in)
- Position: Forward

Team information
- Current team: Frosinone
- Number: 24

Youth career
- 2007–2013: Inter Milan
- 2013–2014: Novara
- 2014: Suno
- 2014–2016: Gozzano
- 2017–2018: Napoli

Senior career*
Years	Team	Apps	(Gls)
2016–2017	Gozzano	20	(8)
2017–2026	Napoli	19	(0)
2018–2019	→ Viterbese Castrense (loan)	22	(1)
2019–2020	→ Cesena (loan)	21	(2)
2020–2021	→ Pro Vercelli (loan)	33	(5)
2021–2022	→ Frosinone (loan)	31	(9)
2024	→ Monza (loan)	13	(0)
2025	→ Venezia (loan)	18	(1)
2025–2026	→ Cremonese (loan)	32	(0)
2026–	Frosinone	1	(0)

International career^{‡}
2017	Italy U18	4	(1)
2022	Italy	1	(0)
- * Club domestic league appearances and goals as of 16 August 2026 ‡ National team caps and goals as of 7 June 2022

Alessio Zerbin (born 3 March 1999) is an Italian professional footballer who plays as a winger for Serie A club Frosinone. He also plays for the Italy national team.

== Club career ==
Zerbin started his senior career with Gozzano in Serie D in the 2015–16 season.

He signed with Napoli on 31 January 2017. He was assigned to their Under-19 squad and scored four goals in the 2017–18 UEFA Youth League. He made one bench appearance for Napoli's senior squad, late in the 2016–17 Serie A season.

On 19 July 2018, he joined Serie C club Viterbese Castrense on a season-long loan. He made his Serie C debut for Viterbese Castrense on 3 November 2018 in a game against Rieti as a 69th-minute substitute for Simone Palermo.

On 24 July 2019, he joined Cesena on loan.

On 17 September 2020, he joined Pro Vercelli on loan.

On 28 July 2021, Zerbin joined Serie B side Frosinone on loan. He scored his first goal for the club on 20 August 2021, converting past Italian football legend Gianluigi Buffon, in his debut league match against Parma.

On 25 January 2024, Zerbin was loaned to Monza.

On 18 January 2025, Zerbin moved on loan to Venezia, with a conditional obligation to buy.

On 29 July 2025, Zerbin joined recently Serie A promoted club Cremonese, on a one-year loan for the 2025–26 season, for €250,000 with a conditional obligation to buy.

On 24 July 2026, Zerbin signed a three-season contract and returned to Frosinone.

== International career ==
In the spring of 2017, Zerbin played in several friendlies for Italy U18 national team and scored a goal against Denmark.

He was selected in the senior Italy squad for the 2022 Finalissima against Argentina on 1 June 2022 and for 2022–23 UEFA Nations League group stage matches against Germany, Hungary, England between 4 and 14 June 2022. He made his full international debut as a substitute on 7 June 2022 in a 2–1 win against Hungary.

== Career statistics ==
=== Club ===
As of match played 25 May 2025

Appearances and goals by club, season and competition
Club	Season	League			Cup		Europe		Other		Total	
Club	Season	Division	Apps	Goals	Apps	Goals	Apps	Goals	Apps	Goals	Apps	Goals
Gozzano	2015–16	Serie D	4	3	–		–		–		4	3
Gozzano	2016–17	Serie D	16	5	–		–		–		16	5
Gozzano	Total		20	8	0	0	0	0	0	0	20	8
Viterbese (loan)	2018–19	Serie C	22	1	3	1	–		–		25	2
Cesena (loan)	2019–20	Serie C	21	2	–		–		–		21	2
Pro Vercelli (loan)	2020–21	Serie C	33	5	–		–		3 (Note: Appearances in Serie C promotion play-offs)	0	36	5
Frosinone (loan)	2021–22	Serie B	31	9	1	0	–		–		32	9
Napoli	2022–23	Serie A	10	0	1	0	3	0	–		14	0
Napoli	2023–24	Serie A	7	0	0	0	0	0	2 (Note: Appearances in Supercoppa Italiana)	2	9	2
Napoli	2024–25	Serie A	2	0	2	0	–		–		4	0
Napoli	Total		19	0	3	0	3	0	2	2	27	2
Monza (loan)	2023–24	Serie A	13	0	–		–		–		13	0
Venezia (loan)	2024–25	Serie A	18	1	–		–		–		18	1
Career total			177	26	7	1	3	0	5	2	192	29

== Honours ==
Napoli

- Serie A: 2022–23
