= 2024–25 SSC Napoli season =

Napoli
2024–25 season
- Owner: Filmauro
- President: Aurelio De Laurentiis
- Head coach: Antonio Conte
- Stadium: Stadio Diego Armando Maradona
- Serie A: 1st
- Coppa Italia: Round of 16
- Top goalscorer: League: Romelu Lukaku (14); All: Romelu Lukaku (14)
- Highest home attendance: 54,726 vs Hellas Verona; 12 January 2025 (Serie A)
- Lowest home attendance: 45,000 vs Bologna; 25 August 2024 (Serie A)
- Average home league attendance: 50,989
- Biggest win: 5–0 vs Palermo (H); 26 September 2024 (Coppa Italia)
- Biggest defeat: 0–3 vs Hellas Verona (A); 18 August 2024 (Serie A); 0–3 vs Atalanta (H); 3 November 2024 (Serie A)
Home colours	Away colours	Third colours

The 2024–25 season was the 99th season in the history of SSC Napoli, and the club's 18th consecutive season in the Serie A. In addition to the domestic league, the club participated in the Coppa Italia. The club did not play in any European competition for the first time since the 2009–10 season.

== Season summary ==
On 5 June 2024, Napoli officially completed the appointment of head coach Antonio Conte, to be in charge of the team for the next three seasons.

For the month of September 2024, Khvicha Kvaratskhelia was named the Serie A Player of the Month while Antonio Conte picked up the Coach of the Month award.

On 17 January 2025, Kvaratskhelia moved to French club PSG for a reported transfer fee of €80 million (70 million + 10 million in attainable bonuses). It was the second biggest sale in club history, only behind Gonzalo Higuaín's €90 million move to Juventus in 2016.

Napoli secured a fourth Serie A title and a second in three seasons after defeating Cagliari 2–0 at home on the final match day of the season, ending on 82 points, one ahead of second-placed Internazionale.

Following the final match day, summer signing Scott McTominay was named the Serie MVP of the season. Conte would go on to be named the Coach of the Season.

== Players ==
=== First-team squad ===
As of 4 February 2025

Note: Flags indicate national team as defined under FIFA eligibility rules; some limited exceptions apply. Players may hold more than one non-FIFA nationality.

No.	Pos.	Nation	Player
1	GK	ITA	Alex Meret
4	DF	ITA	Alessandro Buongiorno
5	DF	BRA	Juan Jesus
6	MF	SCO	Billy Gilmour
7	FW	BRA	David Neres
8	MF	SCO	Scott McTominay
9	FW	SUI	Noah Okafor (on loan from Milan)
11	FW	BEL	Romelu Lukaku
12	GK	ITA	Claudio Turi
13	DF	KOS	Amir Rrahmani
14	GK	ITA	Nikita Contini
15	MF	DEN	Philip Billing (on loan from Bournemouth)
16	DF	ESP	Rafa Marín

No.	Pos.	Nation	Player
17	DF	URU	Mathías Olivera
18	FW	ARG	Giovanni Simeone
21	FW	ITA	Matteo Politano
22	DF	ITA	Giovanni Di Lorenzo (captain)
26	FW	BEL	Cyril Ngonge
29	MF	ITA	Luis Hasa
30	DF	ITA	Pasquale Mazzocchi
37	DF	ITA	Leonardo Spinazzola
68	MF	SVK	Stanislav Lobotka
81	FW	ITA	Giacomo Raspadori
96	GK	ITA	Simone Scuffet (on loan from Cagliari)
99	MF	CMR	André-Frank Zambo Anguissa

=== Out on loan ===
As of 4 February 2025

Note: Flags indicate national team as defined under FIFA eligibility rules; some limited exceptions apply. Players may hold more than one non-FIFA nationality.

No.	Pos.	Nation	Player
—	GK	ITA	Elia Caprile (at Cagliari until 30 June 2025)
—	DF	ITA	Luigi D'Avino (at Gubbio until 30 June 2025)
—	DF	ITA	Francesco Mezzoni (at Perugia until 30 June 2025)
—	DF	BRA	Natan (at Real Betis until 30 June 2025)
—	DF	ITA	Nosa Edward Obaretin (at Bari until 30 June 2025)
—	DF	ITA	Alessandro Zanoli (at Genoa until 30 June 2025)
—	MF	SWE	Jens Cajuste (at Ipswich Town until 30 June 2025)
—	MF	ITA	Michael Folorunsho (at Fiorentina until 30 June 2025)
—	MF	ITA	Gianluca Gaetano (at Cagliari until 30 June 2025)
—	MF	ITA	Gennaro Iaccarino (at Gubbio until 30 June 2025)
—	MF	DEN	Jesper Lindstrøm (at Everton until 30 June 2025)

No.	Pos.	Nation	Player
—	MF	ITA	Matteo Marchisano (at Cavese until 30 June 2025)
—	MF	MLI	Coli Saco (at Bari until 30 June 2025)
—	MF	ITA	Antonio Vergara (at Reggiana until 30 June 2025)
—	MF	ITA	Alessio Zerbin (at Venezia until 30 June 2025)
—	MF	ITA	Alessandro Spavone (at Guidonia until 30 June 2025)
—	FW	ITA	Giuseppe Ambrosino (at Frosinone until 30 June 2025)
—	FW	MAR	Walid Cheddira (at Espanyol until 30 June 2025)
—	FW	ITA	Antonio Cioffi (at Rimini until 30 June 2025)
—	FW	ITA	Giuseppe D'Agostino (at Giugliano until 30 June 2025)
—	FW	NGR	Victor Osimhen (at Galatasaray until 30 June 2025)
—	FW	ITA	Lorenzo Sgarbi (at Juve Stabia until 30 June 2025)

== Transfers ==
=== Summer window ===
==== In ====
Date	Pos.	Player	From	Fee	Notes	Ref.
30 June 2024	GK	(Italy) Elia Caprile	(Italy) Empoli	End of loan		
30 June 2024	DF	(Italy) Matteo Marchisano	(Italy) Potenza	End of loan		
30 June 2024	DF	(Italy) Nosa Edward Obaretin	(Italy) Trento	End of loan		
30 June 2024	DF	(Italy) Alessandro Zanoli	(Italy) Salernitana	End of loan		
30 June 2024	MF	(Italy) Michael Folorunsho	(Italy) Hellas Verona	End of loan		
30 June 2024	MF	(Italy) Gianluca Gaetano	(Italy) Cagliari	End of loan		
30 June 2024	MF	(Italy) Gennaro Iaccarino	(Italy) Monopoli	End of loan		
30 June 2024	MF	(Italy) Francesco Mezzoni	(Italy) Perugia	End of loan		
30 June 2024	MF	(Mali) Coli Saco	(Italy) Ancona	End of loan		
30 June 2024	FW	(Italy) Giuseppe Ambrosino	(Italy) Catanzaro	End of loan		
30 June 2024	FW	(Italy) Antonio Cioffi	(Italy) Ancona	End of loan		
30 June 2024	FW	(Italy) Giuseppe D'Agostino	(Italy) Picerno	End of loan		
30 June 2024	FW	(Italy) Lorenzo Sgarbi	(Italy) Avellino	End of loan		
30 June 2024	FW	(Italy) Alessio Zerbin	(Italy) Monza	End of loan		
1 July 2024	MF	(Serbia) Matija Popović	(Italy) Monza	Free	To Primavera squad	
10 July 2024	DF	(Italy) Leonardo Spinazzola	(Italy) Roma	Free		
10 July 2024	DF	(Spain) Rafa Marín	(Spain) Real Madrid	€12,000,000		
13 July 2024	DF	(Italy) Alessandro Buongiorno	(Italy) Torino	€35,000,000		
21 August 2024	FW	(Brazil) David Neres	(Portugal) Benfica	€28,000,000		
29 August 2024	FW	(Belgium) Romelu Lukaku	(England) Chelsea	€30,000,000		
30 August 2024	MF	(Scotland) Scott McTominay	(England) Manchester United	€30,500,000		
30 August 2024	MF	(Scotland) Billy Gilmour	(England) Brighton & Hove Albion	€14,000,000		

==== Loans in ====
Date	Pos.	Player	From	Fee	Notes	Ref.

==== Out ====
Date	Pos.	Player	To	Fee	Notes	Ref.
30 June 2024	GK	(Italy) Pierluigi Gollini	(Italy) Atalanta	End of loan		
30 June 2024	MF	(Belgium) Leander Dendoncker	(England) Aston Villa	End of loan		
30 June 2024	MF	(Ivory Coast) Hamed Traorè	(England) Bournemouth	End of loan		
1 July 2024	GK	(Poland) Hubert Idasiak	(Poland) ŁKS Łódź	Free	End of contract	
1 July 2024	MF	(Germany) Diego Demme	(Germany) Hertha BSC	Free	End of contract	
1 July 2024	MF	(Poland) Piotr Zieliński	(Italy) Inter Milan	Free	End of contract	
30 July 2024	DF	(Norway) Leo Skiri Østigård	(France) Rennes	€7,000,000		
30 December 2024	DF	(Portugal) Mário Rui	Unattached	Free	Contract terminated	
17 January 2025	FW	(Georgia (country)) Khvicha Kvaratskhelia	(France) Paris Saint-Germain	€80,000,000		

==== Loans out ====
Date	Pos.	Player	To	Fee	Notes	Ref.
10 July 2024	DF	(Italy) Nosa Edward Obaretin	(Italy) Bari	Free		
11 July 2024	DF	(Italy) Alessandro Zanoli	(Italy) Genoa	Free	Option to buy for €7,000,000, obligation to buy for €7,000,000 under certain conditions	
11 July 2024	FW	(Italy) Lorenzo Sgarbi	(Italy) Bari	Free		
17 July 2024	FW	(Italy) Giuseppe D'Agostino	(Italy) Giugliano	Free		
22 July 2024	FW	(Italy) Antonio Cioffi	(Italy) Rimini	Free		
24 July 2024	FW	(Italy) Giuseppe Ambrosino	(Italy) Frosinone	Free		
26 July 2024	FW	(Denmark) Jesper Lindstrøm	(England) Everton	€2,000,000	Option to buy for €20,000,000	
30 July 2024	DF	(Italy) Matteo Marchisano	(Italy) Cavese	Free		
15 August 2024	DF	(Brazil) Natan	(Spain) Real Betis	€1,000,000	Option to buy for €9,000,000	
19 August 2024	MF	(Sweden) Jens Cajuste	(England) Ipswich Town	€1,500,000	Option to buy for €13,500,000	
27 August 2024	FW	(Morocco) Walid Cheddira	(Spain) Espanyol	Free		
30 August 2024	MF	(Italy) Gianluca Gaetano	(Italy) Cagliari	Free	Obligation to buy for €6,000,000 under certain conditions	
30 August 2024	MF	(Italy) Gennaro Iaccarino	(Italy) Gubbio	Free		
30 August 2024	MF	(Italy) Francesco Mezzoni	(Italy) Perugia	Free		
30 August 2024	MF	(Mali) Coli Saco	(Italy) Bari	Free		
4 September 2024	FW	(Nigeria) Victor Osimhen	(Turkey) Galatasaray	Free	Option to buy for €75,000,000	

=== Winter window ===
==== In ====
Date	Pos.	Player	From	Fee	Notes	Ref.
7 January 2025	FW	(Italy) Lorenzo Sgarbi	(Italy) Bari	Loan terminated early		
8 January 2025	MF	(Italy) Luis Hasa	(Italy) Lecce	€500,000		
29 January 2025	MF	(Italy) Alessandro Spavone	(Italy) Virtus Francavilla	Loan terminated early		

==== Loans in ====
Date	Pos.	Player	From	Fee	Notes	Ref.
7 January 2025	GK	(Italy) Simone Scuffet	(Italy) Cagliari	Free		
11 January 2025	MF	(Denmark) Philip Billing	(England) Bournemouth	Free	Option to buy for €10,000,000	
3 February 2025	FW	(Switzerland) Noah Okafor	(Italy) Milan	€1,500,000	Option to buy for €23,500,000	

==== Out ====
Date	Pos.	Player	To	Fee	Notes	Ref.
17 January 2025	FW	(Georgia (country)) Khvicha Kvaratskhelia	(France) Paris Saint-Germain	€70,000,000		

==== Loans out ====
Date	Pos.	Player	To	Fee	Notes	Ref.
7 January 2025	GK	(Italy) Elia Caprile	(Italy) Cagliari	Free	Option to buy for €8,000,000	
8 January 2025	FW	(Italy) Lorenzo Sgarbi	(Italy) Juve Stabia	Free		
11 January 2025	MF	(Italy) Michael Folorunsho	(Italy) Fiorentina	€1,000,000	Option to buy for €8,000,000	
18 January 2025	FW	(Italy) Alessio Zerbin	(Italy) Venezia	Free	Obligation to buy for an undisclosed fee under certain conditions	
30 January 2025	MF	(Italy) Alessandro Spavone	(Italy) Guidonia	Free		

== Friendlies ==
=== Pre-season ===
16 July 2024 Friendly	Napoli (Italy)	4–0	(Italy) Anaune Val di Non	Dimaro
19:00 CEST (UTC+2)	Spinazzola 44'; Cheddira 54' (pen.); Gaetano 58'; Ngonge 75'	Report		Stadium: Stadio Comunale; Referee: Marco Schmid

20 July 2024 Friendly	Napoli (Italy)	3–0	(Italy) Mantova	Dimaro
18:00 CEST (UTC+2)	Lindstrøm 4'; Spinazzola 11'; Cheddira 17'	Report	Redolfi (yellow card) 13'	Stadium: Stadio Comunale; Referee: Luca Zufferli

28 July 2024 Friendly	Napoli (Italy)	Cancelled	(Turkey) Adana Demirspor	Castel di Sangro
20:00 CEST (UTC+2)				Stadium: Stadio Teofilo Patini
Note: The match was cancelled due to travel issues.

28 July 2024 Friendly	Napoli (Italy)	4–0	(Albania) Egnatia	Castel di Sangro
20:00 CEST (UTC+2)	Kvaratskhelia 22'; Politano 29'; Simeone 52'; Ngonge 68'; Folorunsho (yellow card) 76'; Marín (yellow card) 85'	Report	Zejnullai (yellow card) 78'; Aliyev (yellow card) 85'	Stadium: Stadio Teofilo Patini; Referee: Marco Guida (Italy)

31 July 2024 Friendly	Napoli (Italy)	1–0	(France) Brest	Castel di Sangro
20:00 CEST (UTC+2)	Raspadori 42'	Report		Stadium: Stadio Teofilo Patini; Referee: Alberto Ruben Arena (Italy)

3 August 2024 Friendly	Napoli (Italy)	0–2	(Spain) Girona	Castel di Sangro
18:30 CEST (UTC+2)	Di Lorenzo (yellow card) 80'	Report	Van de Beek 23'; Valery (yellow card) 61'; Martínez (yellow card) 63'; Toni 83'	Stadium: Stadio Teofilo Patini; Referee: Gabriele Scatena (Italy)

== Competitions ==
=== Overall record ===
Competition	First match	Last match	Starting round	Final position	Record							
Competition	First match	Last match	Starting round	Final position	Pld	W	D	L	GF	GA	GD	Win %
Serie A	18 August 2024	23 May 2025	Matchday 1	Winners	38	24	10	4	59	27	+32	63.16
Coppa Italia	10 August 2024	5 December 2024	First round	Round of 16	3	1	1	1	6	3	+3	33.33
Total					41	25	11	5	65	30	+35	60.98

Source: Soccerway

=== Serie A ===
==== League table ====
Pos	Team	Pld	W	D	L	GF	GA	GD	Pts	Qualification or relegation
1	Napoli (C)	38	24	10	4	59	27	+32	82	Qualification for the Champions League league phase
2	Inter Milan	38	24	9	5	79	35	+44	81	Qualification for the Champions League league phase
3	Atalanta	38	22	8	8	78	37	+41	74	Qualification for the Champions League league phase
4	Juventus	38	18	16	4	58	35	+23	70	Qualification for the Champions League league phase
5	Roma	38	20	9	9	56	35	+21	69	Qualification for the Europa League league phase

Source: Serie A
Rules for classification: 1) Points; 2) Tiebreaker for Champions team and third relegated team; 3) Head-to-head points; 4) Head-to-head goal difference; 5) Goal difference; 6) Goals scored; 7) Draw.
(Note: Head-to-head record is used only after all the matches between the teams in question have been played)
(C) Champions

==== Results summary ====
Overall								Home						Away					
Pld	W	D	L	GF	GA	GD	Pts	W	D	L	GF	GA	GD	W	D	L	GF	GA	GD
38	24	10	4	59	27	+32	82	14	3	2	32	13	+19	10	7	2	27	14	+13

Source: Serie A

==== Results by round ====
Round	1	2	3	4	5	6	7	8	9	10	11	12	13	14	15	16	17	18	19	20	21	22	23	24	25	26	27	28	29	30	31	32	33	34	35	36	37	38
Ground	A	H	H	A	A	H	H	A	H	A	H	A	H	A	H	A	A	H	A	H	A	H	A	H	A	A	H	H	A	H	A	H	A	H	A	H	A	H
Result	L	W	W	W	D	W	W	W	W	W	L	D	W	W	L	W	W	W	W	W	W	W	D	D	D	L	D	W	D	W	D	W	W	W	W	D	D	W
Position	19	11	6	2	2	1	1	1	1	1	1	1	1	1	2	2	2	2	1	1	1	1	1	1	1	2	2	2	2	2	2	2	2	1	1	1	1	1

Source: Serie A
A = Away; H = Home; W = Win; D = Draw; L = Loss

==== Matches ====
The match schedule was released on 4 July 2024.

18 August 2024 1	Hellas Verona	3–0	Napoli	Verona
18:30 CEST (UTC+2)	Coppola (yellow card) 20'; Tchatchoua (yellow card) 30'; Livramento 50'; Mosquera 75', 90+4'; Duda (yellow card) 77'; Belahyane (yellow card) 90+1'	Report	Raspadori (yellow card) 89'	Stadium: Stadio Marcantonio Bentegodi; Attendance: 20,027; Referee: Matteo Marchetti

25 August 2024 2	Napoli	3–0	Bologna	Naples
20:45 CEST (UTC+2)	Mazzocchi (yellow card) 43'; Di Lorenzo 45+2'; Rrahmani (yellow card) 56'; Kvaratskhelia 75'; Simeone 90+4'	Report	Lucumí (yellow card) 49'; Posch (yellow card) 50'	Stadium: Stadio Diego Armando Maradona; Attendance: 45,000; Referee: Luca Pairetto

31 August 2024 3	Napoli	2–1	Parma	Naples
20:45 CEST (UTC+2)	Zambo Anguissa (yellow card) 43', (goal) 90+6'; Lobotka (yellow card) 58'; Lukaku 90+2'	Report	Bonny 19' (pen.); Mihăilă (yellow card) 61'; Suzuki (yellow card) 63' (yellow-red card) 75'; Del Prato (yellow card) 88'	Stadium: Stadio Diego Armando Maradona; Attendance: 51,520; Referee: Paride Tremolada

15 September 2024 4	Cagliari	0–4	Napoli	Cagliari
18:00 CEST (UTC+2)	Mina (yellow card) 75'	Report	Di Lorenzo 18'; Lobotka (yellow card) 42'; Lukaku (yellow card) 57', (goal) 70'; Kvaratskhelia 66'; Buongiorno 90+3'	Stadium: Unipol Domus; Attendance: 15,733; Referee: Federico La Penna

21 September 2024 5	Juventus	0–0	Napoli	Turin
18:00 CEST (UTC+2)	McKennie (yellow card) 33'	Report		Stadium: Juventus Stadium; Attendance: 40,295; Referee: Daniele Doveri

29 September 2024 6	Napoli	2–0	Monza	Naples
20:45 CEST (UTC+2)	Politano 22'; Kvaratskhelia (yellow card) 26', (goal) 33'	Report	Maldini (yellow card) 24'; Izzo (yellow card) 36'	Stadium: Stadio Diego Armando Maradona; Attendance: 50,500; Referee: Gianluca Manganiello

4 October 2024 7	Napoli	3–1	Como	Naples
18:30 CEST (UTC+2)	McTominay 1'; Lukaku 53' (pen.); Buongiorno (yellow card) 59'; Neres 86'	Report	Strefezza 43', (yellow card) 59'	Stadium: Stadio Diego Armando Maradona; Attendance: 50,900; Referee: Ermanno Feliciani

20 October 2024 8	Empoli	0–1	Napoli	Empoli
12:30 CEST (UTC+2)	Grassi (yellow card) 33'; Haas (yellow card) 90+6'	Report	Zambo Anguissa (yellow card) 37'; Kvaratskhelia 63' (pen.); Di Lorenzo (yellow card) 76'	Stadium: Stadio Carlo Castellani; Attendance: 15,164; Referee: Rosario Abisso

26 October 2024 9	Napoli	1–0	Lecce	Naples
15:00 CEST (UTC+2)	Ngonge (yellow card) 19'; Di Lorenzo (yellow card) 51', (goal) 73'; Olivera (yellow card) 90'	Report	Pierotti (yellow card) 77'; Rebić (yellow card) 90+3'	Stadium: Stadio Diego Armando Maradona; Attendance: 51,103; Referee: Paride Tremolada

29 October 2024 10	Milan	0–2	Napoli	Milan
20:45 CET (UTC+1)		Report	Lukaku 5'; Kvaratskhelia 43'; Olivera (yellow card) 73'	Stadium: San Siro; Attendance: 73,507; Referee: Andrea Colombo

3 November 2024 11	Napoli	0–3	Atalanta	Naples
12:30 CET (UTC+1)	Mazzocchi (yellow card) 90+3'	Report	Lookman 10', 31'; Kolašinac (yellow card) 65'; Retegui 90+2', (yellow card) 90+4'; Djimsiti (yellow card) 90+4'	Stadium: Stadio Diego Armando Maradona; Attendance: 50,873; Referee: Daniele Doveri

10 November 2024 12	Internazionale	1–1	Napoli	Milan
20:45 CET (UTC+1)	Çalhanoğlu 43', (penalty missed) 74'; Dumfries (yellow card) 80'	Report	McTominay 23'	Stadium: San Siro; Attendance: 72,951; Referee: Maurizio Mariani

24 November 2024 13	Napoli	1–0	Roma	Naples
18:00 CET (UTC+1)	Lukaku 54'	Report	Ndicka (yellow card) 38'; Pisilli (yellow card) 60'; Cristante (yellow card) 90+1'	Stadium: Stadio Diego Armando Maradona; Attendance: 51,164; Referee: Davide Massa

1 December 2024 14	Torino	0–1	Napoli	Turin
15:00 CET (UTC+1)	Walukiewicz (yellow card) 39'; Pedersen (yellow card) 41'; Coco (yellow card) 56'; Ricci (yellow card) 84'	Report	McTominay 31'; Zambo Anguissa (yellow card) 81'	Stadium: Stadio Olimpico Grande Torino; Attendance: 25,060; Referee: Michael Fabbri

8 December 2024 15	Napoli	0–1	Lazio	Naples
20:45 CET (UTC+1)	McTominay (yellow card) 46'; Rrahmani (yellow card) 51'	Report	Dia (yellow card) 19'; Guendouzi (yellow card) 45+1'; Castellanos (yellow card) 62'; Isaksen 79'	Stadium: Stadio Diego Armando Maradona; Attendance: 50,000; Referee: Andrea Colombo

14 December 2024 16	Udinese	1–3	Napoli	Udine
18:00 CET (UTC+1)	Thauvin 22'; Atta (yellow card) 39'	Report	Lukaku 50'; Politano (yellow card) 67'; Giannetti 76' (o.g.); Zambo Anguissa 81'	Stadium: Stadio Friuli; Attendance: 19,981; Referee: Daniele Doveri

21 December 2024 17	Genoa	1–2	Napoli	Genoa
18:00 CET (UTC+1)	Pinamonti 51'; Sabelli (yellow card) 62'; Frendrup (yellow card) 84'	Report	Zambo Anguissa 15'; Rrahmani 23'; Juan Jesus (yellow card) 32'	Stadium: Stadio Luigi Ferraris; Attendance: 33,435; Referee: Federico La Penna

29 December 2024 18	Napoli	1–0	Venezia	Naples
15:00 CET (UTC+1)	Lukaku (penalty missed) 37'; Raspadori 79'	Report	Altare (yellow card) 31'; Stanković (yellow card) 74'; Idzes (yellow card) 90+5'	Stadium: Stadio Diego Armando Maradona; Attendance: 51,199; Referee: Matteo Marchetti

4 January 2025 19	Fiorentina	0–3	Napoli	Florence
18:00 CET (UTC+1)		Report	Neres 29'; Di Lorenzo (yellow card) 39'; Lukaku 54' (pen.); McTominay 68'	Stadium: Stadio Artemio Franchi; Attendance: 21,685; Referee: Gianluca Manganiello

12 January 2025 20	Napoli	2–0	Hellas Verona	Naples
20:45 CET (UTC+1)	Montipò 5' (o.g.); Zambo Anguissa 61'	Report		Stadium: Stadio Diego Armando Maradona; Attendance: 54,726; Referee: Luca Zufferli

18 January 2025 21	Atalanta	2–3	Napoli	Bergamo
20:45 CET (UTC+1)	Retegui 16'; Lookman 55'; Djimsiti (yellow card) 64'; Ruggeri (yellow card) 66'; Scalvini (yellow card) 76'; Hien (yellow card) 85'	Report	Politano 27'; McTominay 40', (yellow card) 88'; Neres (yellow card) 42'; Lukaku 78'	Stadium: Gewiss Stadium; Attendance: 22,874; Referee: Andrea Colombo

25 January 2025 22	Napoli	2–1	Juventus	Naples
18:00 CET (UTC+1)	Zambo Anguissa 57'; Lukaku 69' (pen.); Lobotka (yellow card) 72'; Spinazzola (yellow card) 90+1'	Report	Kolo Muani 43'; Cambiaso (yellow card) 45'; Koopmeiners (yellow card) 90+5'	Stadium: Stadio Diego Armando Maradona; Attendance: 53,589; Referee: Daniele Chiffi

2 February 2025 23	Roma	1–1	Napoli	Rome
20:45 CET (UTC+1)	Koné (yellow card) 51'; Pisilli (yellow card) 72'; Angeliño 90+2'	Report	Politano (yellow card) 14'; Spinazzola 29'	Stadium: Stadio Olimpico; Attendance: 60,788; Referee: Michael Fabbri

9 February 2025 24	Napoli	1–1	Udinese	Naples
20:45 CET (UTC+1)	McTominay 37'	Report	Ekkelenkamp 40'; Lucca (yellow card) 54'	Stadium: Stadio Diego Armando Maradona; Attendance: 50,938; Referee: Livio Marinelli

15 February 2025 25	Lazio	2–2	Napoli	Rome
18:00 CET (UTC+1)	Isaksen 6'; Zaccagni (yellow card) 79'; Dia 87'; Rovella (yellow card) 90+1'	Report	Raspadori 13'; Zambo Anguissa (yellow card) 35'; Marušić 64' (o.g.); Juan Jesus (yellow card) 78'	Stadium: Stadio Olimpico; Attendance: 41,500; Referee: Davide Massa

23 February 2025 26	Como	2–1	Napoli	Como
12:30 CET (UTC+1)	Rrahmani 7' (o.g.); Paz (yellow card) 24'; Diao 77'	Report	Raspadori 17'; Di Lorenzo (yellow card) 68'; McTominay (yellow card) 83'; Simeone (yellow card) 87'	Stadium: Stadio Giuseppe Sinigaglia; Attendance: 10,500; Referee: Gianluca Manganiello

1 March 2025 27	Napoli	1–1	Internazionale	Naples
18:00 CET (UTC+1)	Billing 87'; Contini (yellow card) 88'	Report	Dimarco 22'	Stadium: Stadio Diego Armando Maradona; Attendance: 53,851; Referee: Daniele Doveri

9 March 2025 28	Napoli	2–1	Fiorentina	Naples
15:00 CET (UTC+1)	Lukaku 26'; Buongiorno (yellow card) 47'; Raspadori 60'	Report	Guðmundsson (yellow card) 64', (goal) 66'; Pongračić (yellow card) 88'	Stadium: Stadio Diego Armando Maradona; Attendance: 51,504; Referee: Andrea Colombo

16 March 2025 29	Venezia	0–0	Napoli	Venice
12:30 CET (UTC+1)	Candé (yellow card) 43'; Nicolussi Caviglia (yellow card) 47'	Report	Olivera (yellow card) 88'	Stadium: Stadio Pier Luigi Penzo; Attendance: 11,440; Referee: Maurizio Mariani

30 March 2025 30	Napoli	2–1	Milan	Naples
20:45 CEST (UTC+2)	Politano 2'; Lukaku 19', (yellow card) 40'	Report	Giménez (penalty missed) 69'; Jović 84'; Jiménez (yellow card) 90'	Stadium: Stadio Diego Armando Maradona; Attendance: 52,836; Referee: Simone Sozza

7 April 2025 31	Bologna	1–1	Napoli	Bologna
20:45 CEST (UTC+2)	Ndoye 64'; Aebischer (yellow card) 90+2'	Report	Zambo Anguissa 18', (yellow card) 89'; Di Lorenzo (yellow card) 60'; Olivera (yellow card) 79'	Stadium: Stadio Renato Dall'Ara; Attendance: 31,974; Referee: Davide Massa

14 April 2025 32	Napoli	3–0	Empoli	Naples
20:45 CEST (UTC+2)	McTominay 18', 61'; Lukaku (yellow card) 42', (goal) 56'	Report	Goglichidze (yellow card) 87'	Stadium: Stadio Diego Armando Maradona; Attendance: 50,898; Referee: Michael Fabbri

19 April 2025 33	Monza	0–1	Napoli	Monza
18:00 CEST (UTC+2)	Mota (yellow card) 33'; Akpro (yellow card) 54'; Bianco (yellow card) 70'; Caldirola (yellow card) 86'	Report	Marín (yellow card) 30'; McTominay 72'; Ngonge (yellow card) 90'	Stadium: Stadio Brianteo; Attendance: 13,784; Referee: Federico La Penna

27 April 2025 34	Napoli	2–0	Torino	Naples
20:45 CEST (UTC+2)	McTominay 7', 41'	Report	Maripán (yellow card) 44'; Ilić (yellow card) 53'; Lazaro (yellow card) 90+2'	Stadium: Stadio Diego Armando Maradona; Attendance: 51,144; Referee: Maurizio Mariani

3 May 2025 35	Lecce	0–1	Napoli	Lecce
18:00 CEST (UTC+2)	Krstović (yellow card) 66'; Morente (yellow card) 82'	Report	Raspadori 24'	Stadium: Stadio Via del mare Attendance: 28,403; Referee: Davide Massa

11 May 2025 36	Napoli	2–2	Genoa	Naples
20:45 CEST (UTC+2)	Lukaku 15'; Raspadori 64'; Billing (yellow card) 89'	Report	Meret 32' (o.g.); Vásquez (yellow card) 45', (goal) 84'; Vitinha (yellow card) 58'	Stadium: Stadio Diego Armando Maradona; Attendance: 51,426; Referee: Marco Piccinini

18 May 2025 37	Parma	0–0	Napoli	Parma
20:45 CEST (UTC+2)	Estévez (yellow card) 36'; Del Prato (yellow card) 70'	Report	Di Lorenzo (yellow card) 73'; Mazzocchi (yellow card) 90+4'	Stadium: Stadio Ennio Tardini; Attendance: 20,338; Referee: Daniele Doveri

23 May 2025 38	Napoli	2–0	Cagliari	Naples
20:45 CEST (UTC+2)	Politano (yellow card) 31'; McTominay 42'; Lukaku 51', (yellow card) 52'	Report	Makoumbou (yellow card) 31'	Stadium: Stadio Diego Armando Maradona; Attendance: 53,400; Referee: Federico La Penna

=== Coppa Italia ===
10 August 2024 First round	Napoli	0–0 (4–3 p)	Modena	Naples
21:15 CEST (UTC+2)	Zambo Anguissa (yellow card) 26'	Report		Stadium: Stadio Diego Armando Maradona; Attendance: 40,000; Referee: Kevin Bonacina
	Penalties
	Di Lorenzo (penalty scored); Cheddira (penalty missed); Ngonge (penalty scored); Simeone (penalty scored); Kvaratskhelia (penalty scored)		(penalty scored) Palumbo; (penalty scored) Magnino; (penalty missed) Battistella; (penalty scored) Bozhanaj; (penalty missed) Zaro

26 September 2024 Second round	Napoli	5–0	Palermo	Naples
21:00 CEST (UTC+2)	Ngonge 7', 12'; Juan Jesus 42'; Neres 70'; McTominay 77'; Marín (yellow card) 86'	Report	Vasic (red card) 58'	Stadium: Stadio Diego Armando Maradona; Attendance: 51,000; Referee: Giuseppe Collu

5 December 2024 Round of 16	Lazio	3–1	Napoli	Rome
21:00 CET (UTC+1)	Zaccagni (penalty missed) 21', (yellow card) 57'; Noslin 32', 41', 50'; Hysaj (yellow card) 80'	Report	Marín (yellow card) 26'; Simeone 36'; Neres (yellow card) 84'	Stadium: Stadio Olimpico; Attendance: 35,303; Referee: Luca Pairetto

== Statistics ==
=== Appearances and goals ===
No.	Pos	Nat	Player	Total		Serie A		Coppa Italia	
No.	Pos	Nat	Player	Apps	Goals	Apps	Goals	Apps	Goals
Goalkeepers
1	GK	(Italy) ITA	Alex Meret	35	0	34	0	1	0
14	GK	(Italy) ITA	Nikita Contini	0	0	0	0	0	0
96	GK	(Italy) ITA	Simone Scuffet	1	0	1	0	0	0
Defenders
4	DF	(Italy) ITA	Alessandro Buongiorno	23	1	22	1	1	0
5	DF	(Brazil) BRA	Juan Jesus	17	1	12+3	0	2	1
13	DF	(Kosovo) KOS	Amir Rrahmani	39	1	38	1	1	0
16	DF	(Spain) ESP	Rafa Marín	6	0	1+3	0	2	0
17	DF	(Uruguay) URU	Mathías Olivera	33	0	26+6	0	0+1	0
22	DF	(Italy) ITA	Giovanni Di Lorenzo	39	3	37	3	1+1	0
30	DF	(Italy) ITA	Pasquale Mazzocchi	22	0	7+13	0	2	0
37	DF	(Italy) ITA	Leonardo Spinazzola	30	1	17+10	1	3	0
Midfielders
6	MF	(Scotland) SCO	Billy Gilmour	28	0	13+13	0	2	0
8	MF	(Scotland) SCO	Scott McTominay	36	13	33+1	12	0+2	1
15	MF	(Denmark) DEN	Philip Billing	10	1	1+9	1	0	0
40	MF	(Italy) ITA	Luis Hasa	0	0	0	0	0	0
68	MF	(Slovakia) SVK	Stanislav Lobotka	35	0	31+1	0	2+1	0
79	MF	(Serbia) SRB	Matija Popović	0	0	0	0	0	0
99	MF	(Cameroon) CMR	André-Frank Zambo Anguissa	36	6	31+3	6	1+1	0
Forwards
7	FW	(Brazil) BRA	David Neres	30	3	13+15	2	2	1
9	FW	(Switzerland) SUI	Noah Okafor	4	0	0+4	0	0	0
11	FW	(Belgium) BEL	Romelu Lukaku	38	14	35+1	14	0+2	0
18	FW	(Argentina) ARG	Giovanni Simeone	33	2	1+29	1	2+1	1
21	FW	(Italy) ITA	Matteo Politano	39	4	34+3	4	1+1	0
26	FW	(Belgium) BEL	Cyril Ngonge	21	2	1+17	0	2+1	2
81	FW	(Italy) ITA	Giacomo Raspadori	29	6	11+15	6	3	0
Players transferred/loaned out during the season
11	FW	(Morocco) MAR	Walid Cheddira	2	0	0+1	0	0+1	0
23	FW	(Italy) ITA	Alessio Zerbin	4	0	0+2	0	1+1	0
25	GK	(Italy) ITA	Elia Caprile	6	0	3+1	0	2	0
77	FW	(Georgia (country)) GEO	Khvicha Kvaratskhelia	19	5	15+2	5	1+1	0
90	MF	(Italy) ITA	Michael Folorunsho	7	0	0+6	0	1	0

Source: Competitions
