= 2026–27 SSC Napoli season =

Napoli
2026–27 season
- Owner: Filmauro
- President: Aurelio De Laurentiis
- Head coach: Massimiliano Allegri
- Stadium: Stadio Diego Armando Maradona
- Serie A: 10th
- Coppa Italia: Round of 16
- UEFA Champions League: League phase
- Top goalscorer: League: Kevin De Bruyne (4); All: Scott McTominay (5)
- Highest home attendance: 50,463 vs Frosinone; 10 October 2026 (Serie A)
- Lowest home attendance: 35,096 vs Bodø/Glimt; 20 October 2026 (UEFA Champions League)
- Average home league attendance: 45,093
- Biggest win: 3–0 vs Frosinone; 10 October 2026 (Serie A); 4–1 vs Monza; 28 October 2026 (Serie A)
- Biggest defeat: 1–4 vs Porto; 4 November 2026 (UEFA Champions League)
Home colours	Away colours	Third colours

The 2026–27 season is the 101st season in the history of SSC Napoli, and the club's 20th consecutive season in the Serie A. In addition to the domestic league, the club is participating in the Coppa Italia and the UEFA Champions League.

== Players ==
=== First-team squad ===
As of 2 September 2026

Note: Flags indicate national team as defined under FIFA eligibility rules; some limited exceptions apply. Players may hold more than one non-FIFA nationality.

No.	Pos.	Nation	Player
1	GK	ITA	Alex Meret
2	DF	ITA	Costantino Favasuli (on loan from Catanzaro)
4	DF	ITA	Alessandro Buongiorno
5	DF	FRA	Benoît Badiashile (on loan from Chelsea)
6	MF	SCO	Billy Gilmour
7	FW	BRA	David Neres
8	MF	SCO	Scott McTominay
11	MF	BEL	Kevin De Bruyne
13	DF	KOS	Amir Rrahmani
14	GK	UKR	Nikita Contini
16	DF	ESP	Rafa Marín
17	DF	URU	Mathías Olivera
19	FW	DEN	Rasmus Højlund

No.	Pos.	Nation	Player
20	FW	ITA	Lorenzo Lucca
21	FW	ITA	Matteo Politano
22	DF	ITA	Giovanni Di Lorenzo (captain)
23	FW	BRA	Giovane
26	MF	ITA	Antonio Vergara
27	FW	BRA	Alisson Santos
31	DF	NED	Sam Beukema
32	GK	SRB	Vanja Milinković-Savić
35	DF	ITA	Luca Marianucci
37	DF	ITA	Leonardo Spinazzola
68	MF	SVK	Stanislav Lobotka
70	FW	NED	Noa Lang
99	MF	CMR	André-Frank Zambo Anguissa

=== Out on loan ===
As of 1 September 2026

Note: Flags indicate national team as defined under FIFA eligibility rules; some limited exceptions apply. Players may hold more than one non-FIFA nationality.

No.	Pos.	Nation	Player
—	GK	ITA	Mathias Ferrante (at Ospitaletto until 30 June 2027)
—	GK	ITA	Claudio Turi (at Pineto until 30 June 2027)
—	DF	ITA	Luigi D'Avino (at Giugliano until 30 June 2027)
—	DF	ITA	Pasquale Mazzocchi (at Venezia until 30 June 2027)
—	DF	ITA	Nosa Edward Obaretin (at Lorient until 30 June 2027)
—	MF	SWE	Jens Cajuste (at Málaga until 30 June 2027)
—	MF	ITA	Michael Folorunsho (at Monza until 30 June 2027)
—	MF	ITA	Lorenzo Russo (at Crotone until 30 June 2027)

No.	Pos.	Nation	Player
—	FW	ITA	Giuseppe Ambrosino (at Modena until 30 June 2027)
—	FW	ITA	Mattia Esposito (at Bari until 30 June 2027)
—	FW	DEN	Jesper Lindstrøm (at Red Bull Salzburg until 30 June 2027)
—	FW	BEL	Cyril Ngonge (at Monza until 30 June 2027)
—	FW	ITA	Emanuele Rao (at Pisa until 30 June 2027)
—	FW	POR	Dinis Rodrigues (at Eldense B until 30 June 2027)
—	FW	ITA	Lorenzo Sgarbi (at Sambenedettese until 30 June 2027)
—	FW	ITA	Gianluca Vigliotti (at Pineto until 30 June 2027)

== Transfers ==
=== Summer window ===
==== In ====
Date	Pos.	Player	From	Fee	Notes	Ref.
1 July 2026	GK	(Serbia) Vanja Milinković-Savić	(Italy) Torino	€21,000,000	From loan to definitive purchase	
1 July 2026	FW	(Denmark) Rasmus Højlund	(England) Manchester United	€44,000,000	From loan to definitive purchase	
1 July 2026	FW	(Brazil) Alisson Santos	(Portugal) Sporting CP	€16,500,000	From loan to definitive purchase	
3 August 2026	FW	(Italy) Mattia Esposito	(Italy) Sorrento	€700,000		

==== Loans in ====
Date	Pos.	Player	From	Fee	Notes	Ref.
19 August 2026	DF	(Italy) Costantino Favasuli	(Italy) Catanzaro	€1,000,000	Obligation to buy	
22 August 2026	DF	(France) Benoît Badiashile	(England) Chelsea	€4,000,000	Option to buy	

==== Loan returns ====
Date	Pos.	Player	From	Fee	Notes	Ref.
30 June 2026	GK	(Italy) Claudio Turi	(Italy) Team Altamura	Free		
30 June 2026	DF	(Italy) Luca Marianucci	(Italy) Torino	Free		
30 June 2026	DF	(Spain) Rafa Marín	(Spain) Villarreal	Free	Option to buy not exercised	
30 June 2026	DF	(Italy) Nosa Edward Obaretin	(Italy) Empoli	Free	Purchase conditions not met	
30 June 2026	MF	(Sweden) Jens Cajuste	(England) Ipswich Town	Free	Option to buy not exercised	
30 June 2026	MF	(Italy) Michael Folorunsho	(Italy) Cagliari	Free	Option to buy not exercised	
30 June 2026	MF	(Albania) Luis Hasa	(Italy) Carrarese	Free		
30 June 2026	MF	(Italy) Gennaro Iaccarino	(Italy) Arezzo	Free		
30 June 2026	MF	(Italy) Lorenzo Russo	(Italy) Guidonia Montecelio	Free		
30 June 2026	MF	(Mali) Coli Saco	(Italy) Casertana	Free	Option to buy not exercised	
30 June 2026	FW	(Morocco) Walid Cheddira	(Italy) Lecce	Free	Option to buy not exercised	
30 June 2026	FW	(Italy) Antonio Cioffi	(Italy) Latina	Free		
30 June 2026	FW	(Netherlands) Noa Lang	(Turkey) Galatasaray	Free	Option to buy not exercised	
30 June 2026	FW	(Denmark) Jesper Lindstrøm	(Germany) VfL Wolfsburg	Free	Option to buy not exercised	
30 June 2026	FW	(Italy) Lorenzo Lucca	(England) Nottingham Forest	Free	Option to buy not exercised	
30 June 2026	FW	(Belgium) Cyril Ngonge	(Spain) Espanyol	Free	Option to buy not exercised	
30 June 2026	FW	(Italy) Emanuele Rao	(Italy) Bari	Free		
30 June 2026	FW	(Italy) Lorenzo Sgarbi	(Italy) Avellino	Free	Option to buy not exercised	
30 June 2026	FW	(Italy) Alessio Zerbin	(Italy) Cremonese	Free	Option to buy not exercised, purchase conditions not met	

==== Out ====
Date	Pos.	Player	To	Fee	Notes	Ref.
1 July 2026	DF	(Brazil) Juan Jesus	Unattached	Free	End of contract	
1 July 2026	DF	(Italy) Alessandro Zanoli	(Italy) Udinese	€5,000,000	From loan to definitive purchase	
1 July 2026	FW	(Argentina) Giovanni Simeone	(Italy) Torino	€6,000,000	From loan to definitive purchase	
24 July 2026	MF	(Albania) Luis Hasa	(Italy) Frosinone	€2,500,000		
24 July 2026	FW	(Italy) Alessio Zerbin	(Italy) Frosinone	€2,000,000		
30 July 2026	MF	(Mali) Coli Saco	(Latvia) Riga	Undisclosed		
5 August 2026	DF	(Spain) Miguel Gutiérrez	(Germany) Bayer Leverkusen	€26,000,000		
12 August 2026	MF	(Italy) Gennaro Iaccarino	(Italy) Arezzo	Undisclosed		
12 August 2026	FW	(Belgium) Romelu Lukaku	(Turkey) Fenerbahçe	€6,000,000		
15 August 2026	FW	(Italy) Antonio Cioffi	(Italy) Latina	Undisclosed		
28 August 2026	FW	(Morocco) Walid Cheddira	(Italy) Avellino	€2,500,000		

==== Loans out ====
Date	Pos.	Player	To	Fee	Notes	Ref.
1 July 2026	DF	(Italy) Luigi D'Avino	(Italy) Giugliano	Free	Loan extended until June 2027	
1 July 2026	FW	(Italy) Gianluca Vigliotti	(Italy) Pineto	Free	Loan extended until June 2027	
16 July 2026	GK	(Italy) Mathias Ferrante	(Italy) Ospitaletto	Free		
23 July 2026	GK	(Italy) Claudio Turi	(Italy) Pineto	Free		
24 July 2026	FW	(Italy) Giuseppe Ambrosino	(Italy) Modena	Undisclosed	Option to buy, loan extended until June 2027	
31 July 2026	FW	(Italy) Emanuele Rao	(Italy) Pisa	€1,000,000		
4 August 2026	FW	(Italy) Mattia Esposito	(Italy) Bari	Free		
7 August 2026	FW	(Italy) Lorenzo Sgarbi	(Italy) Sambenedettese	Free		
28 August 2026	FW	(Belgium) Cyril Ngonge	(Italy) Monza	€1,000,000	Option to buy	
28 August 2026	MF	(Italy) Michael Folorunsho	(Italy) Monza	€500,000	Option to buy	
31 August 2026	DF	(Italy) Pasquale Mazzocchi	(Italy) Venezia	€1,000,000	Conditional obligation to buy	
1 September 2026	MF	(Denmark) Jesper Lindstrøm	(Austria) Red Bull Salzburg	Free	Option to buy	
1 September 2026	MF	(Sweden) Jens Cajuste	(Spain) Málaga	Free	Option to buy	

==== Loan returns ====
Date	Pos.	Player	To	Fee	Notes	Ref.
1 July 2026	MF	(North Macedonia) Eljif Elmas	(Germany) RB Leipzig	Free	Option to buy not exercised	

=== Winter window ===
==== In ====
Date	Pos.	Player	From	Fee	Notes	Ref.

==== Loans in ====
Date	Pos.	Player	From	Fee	Notes	Ref.

==== Out ====
Date	Pos.	Player	To	Fee	Notes	Ref.

==== Loans out ====
Date	Pos.	Player	To	Fee	Notes	Ref.

== Competitions ==
=== Overall record ===
Competition	First match	Last match	Starting round	Final position	Record							
Competition	First match	Last match	Starting round	Final position	Pld	W	D	L	GF	GA	GD	Win %
Serie A	22 August 2026	30 May 2027	Matchday 1	TBD	11	4	3	4	18	14	+4	36.36
Coppa Italia	16 December 2026	TBD	Round of 16	TBD	0	0	0	0	0	0	+0	—
UEFA Champions League	9 September 2026	TBD	League phase	TBD	4	1	0	3	6	11	−5	25.00
Total					15	5	3	7	24	25	−1	33.33

Last updated: 8 November 2026
Source: Soccerway

=== Serie A ===
==== League table ====
Pos	Team	Pld	W	D	L	GF	GA	GD	Pts
8	Bologna	11	5	2	4	16	14	+2	17
9	Cagliari	12	5	1	6	10	17	−7	16
10	Napoli	11	4	3	4	18	14	+4	15
11	Torino	11	4	2	5	15	17	−2	14
12	Atalanta	11	4	2	5	17	20	−3	14

Updated to match(es) played on 21 November 2026. Source: Serie A
Rules for classification: 1) Points; 2) Head-to-head points; 3) Head-to-head goal difference; 4) Goal difference; 5) Goals scored; 6) Drawing of lots.
End-of-season ties on points for 1st or 17th are instead decided by a one- or two-leg play-off, respectively, unless the play-off would involve a UEFA competition finalist (in which case rules 2–6 apply). Rules 2–6 determine home advantage (for 17th, the better-ranked team hosts the second leg); if three or more teams are tied, they also select the two play-off teams.

==== Results summary ====
Overall								Home						Away					
Pld	W	D	L	GF	GA	GD	Pts	W	D	L	GF	GA	GD	W	D	L	GF	GA	GD
12	5	3	4	19	14	+5	18	3	2	1	10	6	+4	2	1	3	9	8	+1

Last updated: 21 November 2026.
Source: Serie A

==== Results by round ====
Round	1	2	3	4	5	6	7	8	9	10	11	12	13	14	15	16	17	18	19	20	21	22	23	24	25	26	27	28	29	30	31	32	33	34	35	36	37	38
Ground	A	H	A	H	A	H	A	H	A	A	H	H	A	H	H	A	A	H	A	H	A	H	A	H	A	A	H	A	H	A	H	A	H	A	H	H	A	H
Result	W	L	L	W	D	W	L	D	W	L	D	W																										
Position	3	10	12	10	9	8	9	10	7	8	10																											

Updated to match(es) played on 21 November 2026. Source: Serie A
A = Away; H = Home; W = Win; D = Draw; L = Loss

==== Matches ====
The match schedule was released on 5 June 2026.

22 August 2026 1	Genoa	0–2	Napoli	Genoa
20:45 CEST (UTC+2)	Østigård (yellow card) 85'; Sabelli (yellow card) 85'	Report	Politano (yellow card) 54'; De Bruyne 82'; Vergara 87'	Stadium: Stadio Luigi Ferraris; Attendance: 33,113; Referee: Marco Di Bello

30 August 2026 2	Napoli	1–2	Como	Naples
18:30 CEST (UTC+2)	Højlund 30'; Di Lorenzo (yellow card) 37'	Report	Baturina 17'; Douvikas 34'	Stadium: Stadio Diego Armando Maradona; Attendance: 45,000; Referee: Luca Pairetto

5 September 2026 3	Internazionale	3–2	Napoli	Milan
18:00 CEST (UTC+2)	L. Martínez 56', 90+1', (yellow card) 68'; Thuram 82'	Report	Vergara (yellow card) 35'; Politano 50'; Højlund 53'; Marín (yellow card) 77'	Stadium: San Siro; Attendance: 75,423; Referee: Simone Sozza

13 September 2026 4	Napoli	1–0	Bologna	Naples
18:00 CEST (UTC+2)	Lobotka 66'	Report	Amondarain (yellow card) 31'	Stadium: Stadio Diego Armando Maradona; Attendance: 41,000; Referee: Kevin Bonacina

20 September 2026 5	Fiorentina	1–1	Napoli	Florence
12:30 CEST (UTC+2)	Mastantuono (yellow card) 42'; Jiménez 51'; Ranieri (yellow card) 62'; De Gea (yellow card) 83'	Report	Gilmour 23'	Stadium: Stadio Artemio Franchi; Attendance: 22,567; Referee: Daniele Doveri

10 October 2026 6	Napoli	3–0	Frosinone	Naples
20:45 CEST (UTC+2)	De Bruyne 29' (pen.), 90+4'; Lang 32'; Rrahmani (yellow card) 80'; Badiashile (yellow card) 86'	Report		Stadium: Stadio Diego Armando Maradona; Attendance: 50,463; Referee: Ermanno Feliciani

17 October 2026 7	Venezia	1–0	Napoli	Venice
15:00 CEST (UTC+2)	Adams 49'; Bašić (yellow card) 61'; Pérez (yellow card) 80'	Report	De Bruyne (penalty missed) 68'	Stadium: Stadio Pier Luigi Penzo; Attendance: 11,332; Referee: Juan Luca Sacchi

24 October 2026 8	Napoli	3–3	Roma	Naples
18:00 CEST (UTC+2)	Marín (yellow card) 4'; Zambo Anguissa 28'; McTominay 48', 83'	Report	Cristante (yellow card) 30'; Rensch (yellow card) 45'; Balerdi (yellow card) 61', (goal) 74', 89'; Soulé 69'; de Roon (yellow card) 86'	Stadium: Stadio Diego Armando Maradona; Attendance: 42,000; Referee: Andrea Colombo

28 October 2026 9	Monza	1–4	Napoli	Monza
20:45 CET (UTC+1)	Goglichidze (yellow card) 8'; Varela 43'; Ondoa (yellow card) 52'; Colombo (yellow card) 88'	Report	Højlund 10'; Politano 48'; Marín 62'; De Bruyne 67'	Stadium: Stadio Brianteo; Attendance: 13,694; Referee: Giovanni Ayroldi

1 November 2026 10	Juventus	2–0	Napoli	Turin
20:45 CET (UTC+1)	Douglas Luiz (yellow card) 16'; Lucumí (yellow card) 20'; Alajbegović 70', (yellow card) 71'; Boga 87'	Report	Marianucci (yellow card) 38' (yellow-red card) 75'; Marín (yellow card) 90+1'	Stadium: Juventus Stadium; Attendance: 41,691; Referee: Simone Sozza

8 November 2026 11	Napoli	1–1	Lazio	Naples
12:30 CET (UTC+1)	Lang (yellow card) 44'; Pedraza 48' (o.g.); Gilmour (yellow card) 65'; Vergara (yellow card) 65'	Report	Frattesi 28'; Pedraza (yellow card) 78'	Stadium: Stadio Diego Armando Maradona; Attendance: 47,000; Referee: Luca Pairetto

21 November 2026 12	Napoli	1–0	Torino	Naples
20:45 CET (UTC+1)	Gilmour (yellow card) 56'; McTominay 73'; Anguissa (yellow card) 76'	Report	Comuzzo (yellow card) 54'	Stadium: Stadio Diego Armando Maradona; Referee: Marco Di Bello

29 November 2026 13	Sassuolo	v	Napoli	Reggio Emilia
15:00 CET (UTC+1)		Report		Stadium: Mapei Stadium – Città del Tricolore

5 December 2026 14	Napoli	v	Lecce	Naples
20:45 CET (UTC+1)		Report		Stadium: Stadio Diego Armando Maradona

13 December 2026 15	Napoli	v	Milan	Naples
20:45 CET (UTC+1)		Report		Stadium: Stadio Diego Armando Maradona

20 December 2026 16	Atalanta	v	Napoli	Bergamo
20:45 CET (UTC+1)		Report		Stadium: Gewiss Stadium

3 January 2027 17	Parma	v	Napoli	Parma
18:00 CET (UTC+1)		Report		Stadium: Stadio Ennio Tardini

7 January 2027 18	Napoli	v	Cagliari	Naples
20:45 CET (UTC+1)		Report		Stadium: Stadio Diego Armando Maradona

11 January 2027 19	Udinese	v	Napoli	Udine
20:45 CET (UTC+1)		Report		Stadium: Stadio Friuli

16 January 2027 20	Napoli	v	Fiorentina	Naples
--:-- CET (UTC+1)		Report		Stadium: Stadio Diego Armando Maradona

23 January 2027 21	Como	v	Napoli	Como
--:-- CET (UTC+1)		Report		Stadium: Stadio Giuseppe Sinigaglia

30 January 2027 22	Napoli	v	Internazionale	Naples
--:-- CET (UTC+1)		Report		Stadium: Stadio Diego Armando Maradona

6 February 2027 23	Lecce	v	Napoli	Lecce
--:-- CET (UTC+1)		Report		Stadium: Stadio Via del mare

13 February 2027 24	Napoli	v	Juventus	Naples
--:-- CET (UTC+1)		Report		Stadium: Stadio Diego Armando Maradona

20 February 2027 25	Lazio	v	Napoli	Rome
--:-- CET (UTC+1)		Report		Stadium: Stadio Olimpico

27 February 2027 26	Frosinone	v	Napoli	Frosinone
--:-- CET (UTC+1)		Report		Stadium: Stadio Benito Stirpe

6 March 2027 27	Napoli	v	Parma	Naples
--:-- CET (UTC+1)		Report		Stadium: Stadio Diego Armando Maradona

13 March 2027 28	Bologna	v	Napoli	Bologna
--:-- CET (UTC+1)		Report		Stadium: Stadio Renato Dall'Ara

20 March 2027 29	Napoli	v	Venezia	Naples
--:-- CET (UTC+1)		Report		Stadium: Stadio Diego Armando Maradona

3 April 2027 30	Cagliari	v	Napoli	Cagliari
--:-- CEST (UTC+2)		Report		Stadium: Unipol Domus

10 April 2027 31	Napoli	v	Sassuolo	Naples
--:-- CEST (UTC+2)		Report		Stadium: Stadio Diego Armando Maradona

17 April 2027 32	Milan	v	Napoli	Milan
--:-- CEST (UTC+2)		Report		Stadium: San Siro

24 April 2027 33	Napoli	v	Udinese	Naples
--:-- CEST (UTC+2)		Report		Stadium: Stadio Diego Armando Maradona

1 May 2027 34	Roma	v	Napoli	Rome
--:-- CEST (UTC+2)		Report		Stadium: Stadio Olimpico

8 May 2027 35	Napoli	v	Monza	Naples
--:-- CEST (UTC+2)		Report		Stadium: Stadio Diego Armando Maradona

15 May 2027 36	Napoli	v	Genoa	Naples
--:-- CEST (UTC+2)		Report		Stadium: Stadio Diego Armando Maradona

22 May 2027 37	Torino	v	Napoli	Turin
--:-- CEST (UTC+2)		Report		Stadium: Stadio Olimpico Grande Torino

29 May 2027 38	Napoli	v	Atalanta	Naples
--:-- CEST (UTC+2)		Report		Stadium: Stadio Diego Armando Maradona

=== Coppa Italia ===
16 December 2026 Round of 16	Napoli	v	Fiorentina	Naples
21:00 CET (UTC+1)		Report		Stadium: Stadio Diego Armando Maradona

=== UEFA Champions League ===
==== League phase ====
The draw for the league phase was held on 27 August 2026.

Pos	Team	Pld	W	D	L	GF	GA	GD	Pts
25	(Norway) Bodø/Glimt	4	1	1	2	4	9	−5	4
26	(Portugal) Porto	4	1	0	3	6	7	−1	3
27	(Italy) Napoli	4	1	0	3	6	11	−5	3
28	(Spain) Villarreal	4	1	0	3	8	14	−6	3
29	(Greece) AEK Athens	4	1	0	3	5	11	−6	3

Updated to match(es) played on 4 November 2026. Source: UEFA
Rules for classification: League phase tiebreakers

Round	1	2	3	4	5	6	7	8
Ground	H	A	H	A	A	H	H	A
Result	L	L	W	L				
Position	27	32	22	27				

Updated to match(es) played on 4 November 2026. Source: UEFA
A = Away; H = Home; W = Win; D = Draw; L = Loss

9 September 2026 1	Napoli (Italy)	0–1	(England) Arsenal	Naples, Italy
21:00 CEST (UTC+2)	Gilmour (yellow card) 42'; Lucca (yellow card) 85'	Report	Ødegaard 75', (yellow card) 90+1'	Stadium: Stadio Diego Armando Maradona; Attendance: 44,083; Referee: Glenn Nyberg (Sweden)

13 October 2026 2	Villarreal (Spain)	3–1	(Italy) Napoli	Villarreal, Spain
21:00 CEST (UTC+2)	Mikautadze 23', (yellow card) 33'; Mouriño 26'; Saliba (yellow card) 67'; Oluwaseyi 86'	Report	Rrahmani 8'; Giovane (yellow card) 55'; De Bruyne (yellow card) 62'; Di Lorenzo (yellow card) 85'	Stadium: Estadio de la Cerámica; Attendance: 19,128; Referee: Daniel Siebert (Germany)

20 October 2026 3	Napoli (Italy)	4–3	(Norway) Bodø/Glimt	Naples, Italy
21:00 CEST (UTC+2)	Politano 1'; McTominay 41', 75'; Zambo Anguissa (yellow card) 48'; Lang (yellow card) 58'; Di Lorenzo (yellow card) 86'; Bjørtuft 88' (o.g.)	Report	Hague 27'; Helmersen 62'; Fet 90+4'	Stadium: Stadio Diego Armando Maradona; Attendance: 35,096; Referee: José María Sánchez Martínez (Spain)

4 November 2026 4	Porto (Portugal)	4–1	(Italy) Napoli	Porto, Portugal
21:00 CET (UTC+1)	Bednarek 11'; Veiga (yellow card) 45+2', (goal) 71'; Kiwior 80'; Aghehowa 90' (pen.)	Report	Vergara (yellow card) 2'; Zambo Anguissa (yellow card) 21'; Rrahmani (yellow card) 36'; McTominay (yellow card) 36', (goal) 43'; Marín (red card) 89'	Stadium: Estádio do Dragão; Attendance: 49,190; Referee: Michael Oliver (England)

24 November 2026 5	Manchester City (England)	v	(Italy) Napoli	Manchester, England
21:00 GMT (UTC±0)		Report		Stadium: Etihad Stadium

8 December 2026 6	Napoli (Italy)	v	(Belgium) Club Brugge	Naples, Italy
21:00 CET (UTC+1)		Report		Stadium: Stadio Diego Armando Maradona

20 January 2027 7	Sabah (Azerbaijan)	v	(Italy) Napoli	Baku, Azerbaijan
21:45 AZT (UTC+4)		Report		Stadium: Tofiq Bahramov Republican Stadium

27 January 2027 8	Napoli (Italy)	v	(Norway) Viking	Naples, Italy
21:00 CET (UTC+1)		Report		Stadium: Stadio Diego Armando Maradona

== Statistics ==
=== Appearances and goals ===
No.	Pos	Nat	Player	Total		Serie A		Coppa Italia		Champions League	
No.	Pos	Nat	Player	Apps	Goals	Apps	Goals	Apps	Goals	Apps	Goals
Goalkeepers
1	GK	(Italy) ITA	Alex Meret	10	0	7	0	0	0	3	0
14	GK	(Ukraine) UKR	Nikita Contini	0	0	0	0	0	0	0	0
32	GK	(Serbia) SRB	Vanja Milinković-Savić	5	0	3	0	0	0	1+1	0
Defenders
2	DF	(Italy) ITA	Costantino Favasuli	3	0	0+2	0	0	0	0+1	0
4	DF	(Italy) ITA	Alessandro Buongiorno	0	0	0	0	0	0	0	0
5	DF	(France) FRA	Benoît Badiashile	5	0	3+1	0	0	0	1	0
13	DF	(Kosovo) KOS	Amir Rrahmani	13	1	8+1	0	0	0	4	1
16	DF	(Spain) ESP	Rafa Marín	13	1	9	1	0	0	4	0
17	DF	(Uruguay) URU	Mathías Olivera	10	0	5+3	0	0	0	1+1	0
22	DF	(Italy) ITA	Giovanni Di Lorenzo	13	0	10	0	0	0	3	0
31	DF	(Netherlands) NED	Sam Beukema	5	0	1+2	0	0	0	1+1	0
35	DF	(Italy) ITA	Luca Marianucci	2	0	1+1	0	0	0	0	0
37	DF	(Italy) ITA	Leonardo Spinazzola	9	0	5+2	0	0	0	1+1	0
Midfielders
6	MF	(Scotland) SCO	Billy Gilmour	10	1	3+4	1	0	0	3	0
8	MF	(Scotland) SCO	Scott McTominay	10	5	6+1	2	0	0	3	3
11	MF	(Belgium) BEL	Kevin De Bruyne	14	4	5+5	4	0	0	4	0
26	MF	(Italy) ITA	Antonio Vergara	8	1	2+4	1	0	0	1+1	0
68	MF	(Slovakia) SVK	Stanislav Lobotka	12	1	8+1	1	0	0	1+2	0
99	MF	(Cameroon) CMR	André-Frank Zambo Anguissa	9	1	6+1	1	0	0	2	0
Forwards
7	FW	(Brazil) BRA	David Neres	6	0	1+3	0	0	0	0+2	0
19	FW	(Denmark) DEN	Rasmus Højlund	13	3	8+1	3	0	0	4	0
20	FW	(Italy) ITA	Lorenzo Lucca	12	0	2+7	0	0	0	0+3	0
21	FW	(Italy) ITA	Matteo Politano	14	3	8+2	2	0	0	4	1
23	FW	(Brazil) BRA	Giovane	7	0	1+3	0	0	0	1+2	0
27	FW	(Brazil) BRA	Alisson Santos	5	0	2+2	0	0	0	1	0
70	FW	(Netherlands) NED	Noa Lang	11	1	6+2	1	0	0	1+2	0
Players transferred/loaned out during the season

Last updated: 4 November 2026
Source: Competitions
