= Billy Gilmour =

Scottish footballer (born 2001)

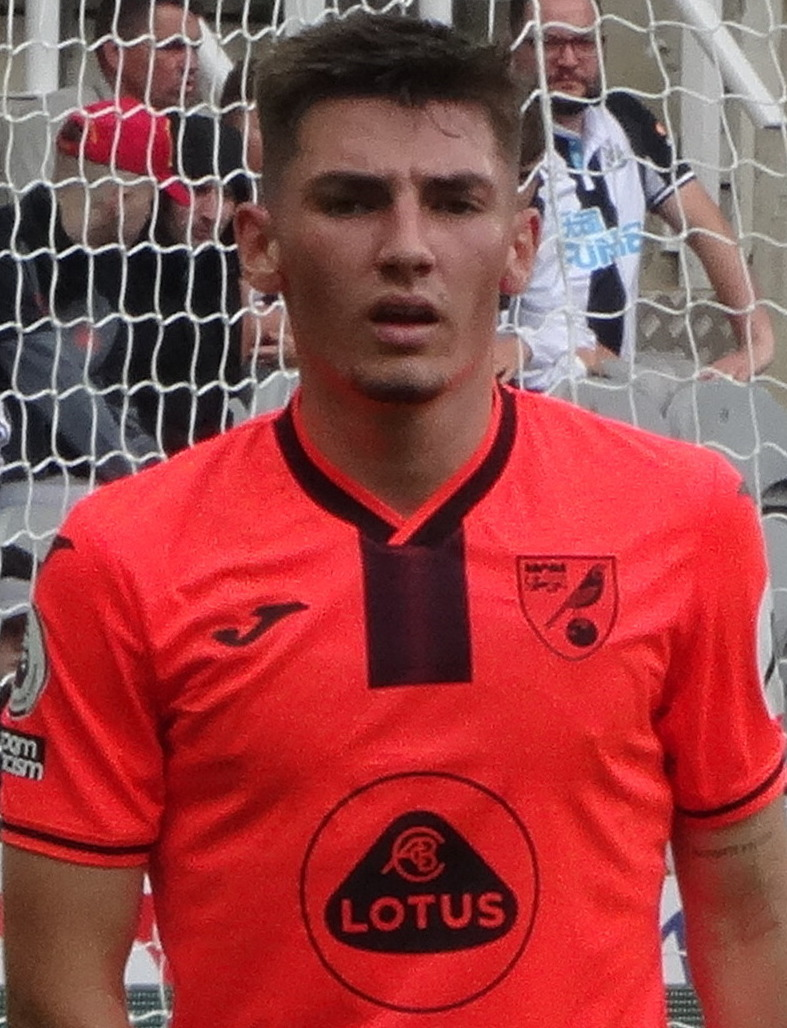
- Gilmour playing for Norwich City in 2021

Personal information
- Full name: Billy Clifford Gilmour
- Date of birth: 11 June 2001 (age 25)
- Place of birth: Irvine, Ayrshire, Scotland
- Height: 5 ft 7 in (1.70 m)
- Position: Defensive midfielder

Team information
- Current team: Napoli
- Number: 6

Youth career
- 2009–2017: Rangers
- 2017–2019: Chelsea

Senior career*
Years	Team	Apps	(Gls)
2019–2022	Chelsea	11	(0)
2021–2022	→ Norwich City (loan)	24	(0)
2022–2024	Brighton & Hove Albion	46	(0)
2024–	Napoli	52	(2)

International career^{‡}
2015–2016	Scotland U15	1	(0)
2016–2017	Scotland U16	1	(0)
2017–2018	Scotland U17	7	(2)
2017–2019	Scotland U19	7	(3)
2018–2021	Scotland U21	12	(1)
2021–	Scotland	52	(2)
- * Club domestic league appearances and goals as of 13:17, 21 November 2026 (UTC) ‡ National team caps and goals as of 16 November 2026

Billy Clifford Gilmour (born 11 June 2001) is a Scottish professional footballer who plays as a defensive midfielder for Serie A club Napoli and the Scotland national team. He is considered one of Scotland's best players, particularly due to his passing skills and his style of midfield play.

Gilmour developed in the Rangers academy and trained with their first-team squad aged 15. He joined Chelsea in 2017 after turning down a professional contract with Rangers, made 22 appearances, and was on the bench for their UEFA Champions League and FA Cup finals in 2021. He spent a season on loan at Norwich City where the club were relegated, before he signed with Brighton & Hove Albion on a permanent basis in September 2022. Gilmour signed for Italian side Napoli on a permanent deal on deadline day in August 2024, winning the Scudetto in his first season.

Gilmour represented Scotland at all youth levels from under-15, under-16, under-17, under-19 and under-21 levels before making his senior debut in 2021. He was selected for their UEFA Euro 2020 squad later that year, and was subsequently selected for UEFA Euro 2024. In October 2026, Gilmour became the youngest Scotsman ever to gain 50 caps, surpassing a 36-year record.

== Early life ==
Gilmour was born on 11 June 2001 at Ayrshire Central Hospital in Irvine, North Ayrshire, and was raised in nearby Ardrossan. His father, William Gilmour, served with the Royal Navy and played junior football for Ardrossan Winton Rovers. As a boy, Gilmour attended Stanley Primary School in Ardrossan and then, as a teenager, attended Grange Academy in Kilmarnock, where he was part of the Scottish Football Association (SFA) Performance School programme. He listed Cesc Fàbregas, Luka Modrić and Andrés Iniesta as his football role models.

== Club career ==
=== Rangers ===
Gilmour spent three days at a young age playing for the Celtic academy, but he then joined the Rangers academy and he rapidly rose through their ranks. He made his debut for the under-20 development team in December 2016 at the age of 15, and was invited to train with the first-team squad the following month by manager Mark Warburton. Gilmour was given a squad number and, following Warburton's departure from the club, was twice included in the provisional squad for the Scottish Cup matches by Rangers caretaker manager Graeme Murty.

The next Rangers manager, Pedro Caixinha, described Gilmour as a player with a "bright future" and held talks with the player's family in an attempt to persuade him to stay with the club. Rangers, however, announced in May 2017 that they had reached an agreement for Gilmour to join Chelsea for a "significant fee". Reports suggested that Chelsea would pay an initial development fee of around £500,000, with potential further payments dependent on his progress. SFA Performance Director Malky Mackay had advised Gilmour and his family that he should stay at Rangers, as he would have had more chance of gaining first team experience. Mackay said, "I really hope he goes out on loan quickly to someone and keeps progressing".

=== Chelsea ===
==== Youth ====
Gilmour became officially contracted to Chelsea in July 2017, following his 16th birthday. He joined the club's under-18 squad, making a goalscoring debut in an Under-18 Premier League match against Arsenal during September 2017, and going on to score in each of his first three appearances. In July 2018, after turning 17, Gilmour signed his first professional contract with Chelsea.

==== 2019–20 ====
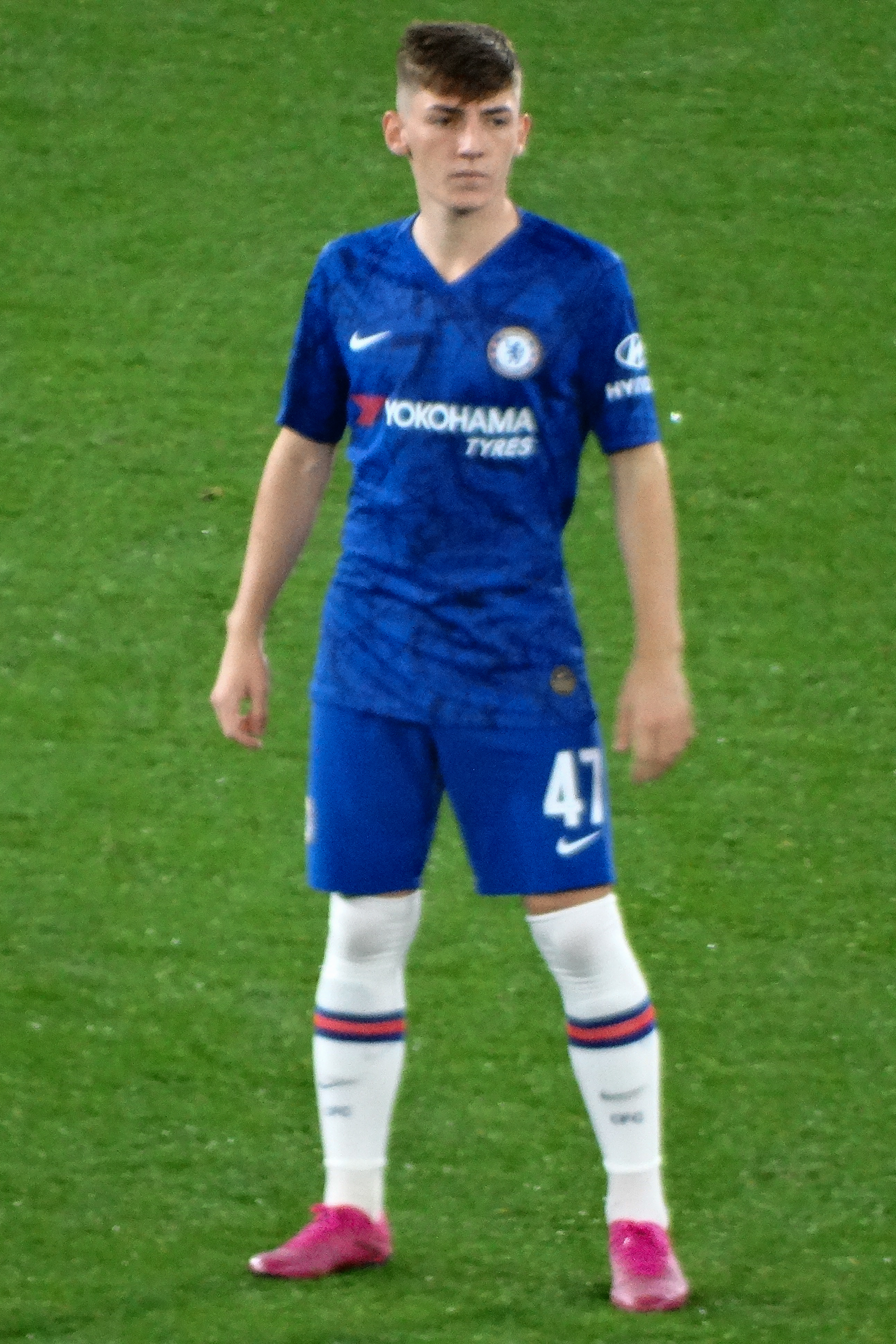
Gilmour playing for Chelsea in 2019

Newly appointed Chelsea manager Frank Lampard gave Gilmour his senior debut on 10 July 2019, in a pre-season friendly against Bohemians in Dublin. His first appearance in a competitive matchday squad for the first-team came in the 2019 UEFA Super Cup against Liverpool, when he was an unused substitute.

He made his Premier League debut on 31 August against Sheffield United, coming on in the 84th minute for Tammy Abraham. He made his full debut on 25 September, playing the full 90 minutes in a 7–1 EFL Cup win against Grimsby Town. Gilmour was added to the Chelsea first-team squad on a permanent basis in February 2020. He was widely praised for his performance in a 2–0 win against Liverpool in an FA Cup tie on 3 March. Gilmour later made his first Premier League start later that week on 8 March against Everton, earning Man of the Match honours in a 4–0 win. He did not play much for the next six months or so, due to the lockdown caused by COVID-19 and a knee injury. Gilmour made 11 appearances for the Chelsea first team during the 2019–20 season, and was awarded the club's Academy Player of the Year award.

==== 2020–21 ====
In September 2020, Gilmour took the 23 squad number for 2020–21 season after Michy Batshuayi returned to Crystal Palace on loan. Gilmour returned to the Chelsea starting lineup on 8 December 2020, when he made his first Champions League start in a 1–1 draw with Krasnodar. Under Thomas Tuchel, Gilmour featured periodically. He was an unused substitute as Chelsea defeated Manchester City 1–0 in the 2021 UEFA Champions League Final on 29 May.

==== 2021–22: Loan to Norwich City ====
In July 2021, Gilmour joined fellow Premier League club Norwich City on a season-long loan. Gilmour cited fellow Scotland international Grant Hanley as an influencing factor in his decision to join the club. He played 28 times for Norwich during the 2021–22 season, but the team finished last in the 2021–22 Premier League and were relegated.

In June 2022, Chelsea exercised an option to extend Gilmour's contract to the end of the 2023–24 season.

=== Brighton & Hove Albion ===
On 1 September 2022, Gilmour transferred to fellow Premier League club Brighton & Hove Albion on a four-year deal. He made his debut three days later, coming on as a 93rd-minute substitute for Moisés Caicedo in the 5–2 home win over Leicester. Gilmour made his first Brighton start on 9 November, playing the whole match of the 3–1 EFL Cup third round victory away at Arsenal, assisting Tariq Lamptey's goal. His first Premier League start for Brighton came on his sixth appearance, playing the whole match and picking up a yellow card in the 4–2 home loss against Arsenal on 31 December.

After almost three months without an appearance, on 29 April 2023, Gilmour played the whole of the 6–0 home thrashing of Wolverhampton Wanderers, Brighton's biggest Premier League victory; he was also selected to start in subsequent wins over Manchester United at home and Arsenal away. Gilmour and Brighton finished the season 6th in Premier League, which qualified them for the Europa League for the first time in the club's history.

On 21 September 2023, Gilmour started in Brighton's first European match in the club's history, against AEK Athens.

=== Napoli ===
On 30 August 2024, Gilmour joined Serie A side Napoli, signing a five-year contract for a reported transfer fee of £12 million plus £4 million in add-ons. His international teammate Scott McTominay joined Napoli from Manchester United on the same day. By January 2025, he seemed to have lost his place to teammate Stanislav Lobotka, but returned to the starting lineup in March.

Napoli won Serie A on the final day of the season, giving Gilmour and compatriot McTominay the first league titles of their careers.

On 22 September 2025, Gilmour scored the first goal of his club career when he opened the scoring for Napoli in their 3–2 win over Pisa.

== International career ==
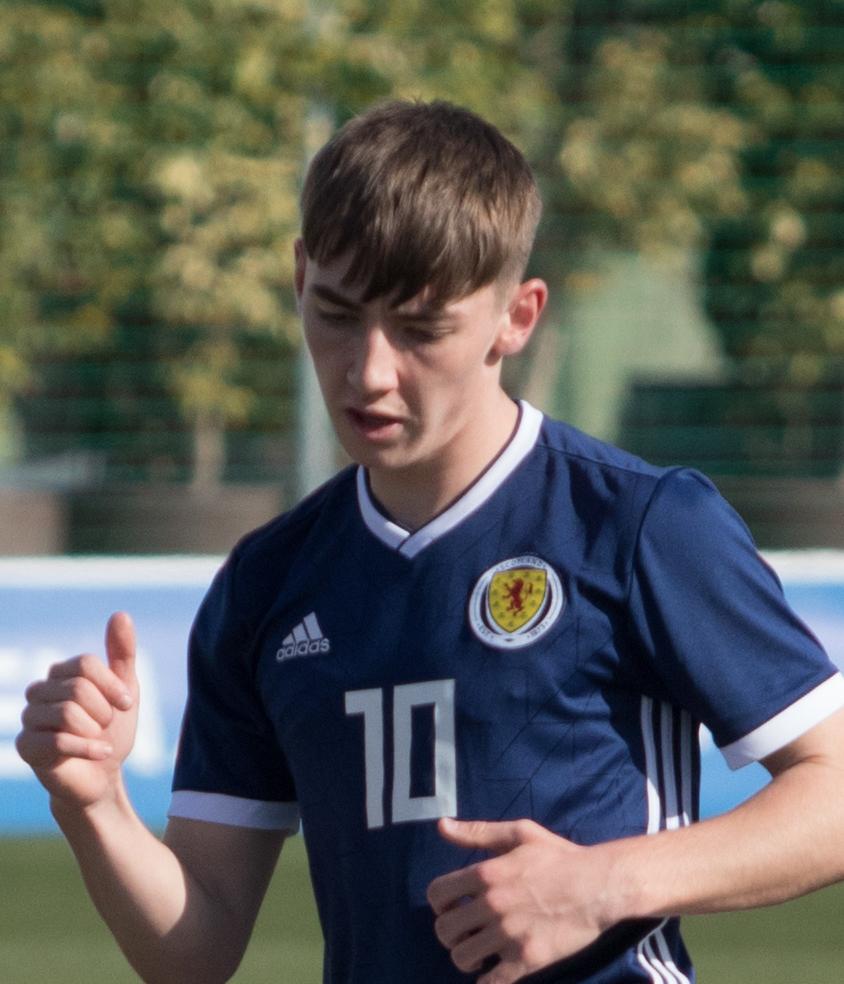
Gilmour playing for Scotland U19 in 2019

Gilmour played for the Scotland under-16s in the 2016 Victory Shield tournament. He made his Scotland under-17 debut against Italy in August 2017, and scored his first international goal in a 2–1 defeat against England two days later. Under-21 debut followed when he featured in a 1–0 win against France at the 2018 Toulon Tournament, and won the Revelation of the Tournament award after helping Scotland to a fourth-placed finish.

Gilmour was included in the Scotland for UEFA Euro 2020 by Steve Clarke. He made his full international debut on 2 June 2021, coming off the bench in the 81st minute of a pre-tournament friendly against the Netherlands. Gilmour made his first start for Scotland in a goalless draw against England on 18 June, and was awarded man of the match by UEFA. He then tested positive for COVID-19, meaning that he missed Scotland's final group game against Croatia.

Gilmour remained in the squad for Scotland's continuing 2022 World Cup qualifiers in September, starting all five games against Denmark, Moldova, Austria, Israel and the Faroe Islands. His performances were widely acclaimed, with him winning man of the match in the 1–0 victory over Moldova at Hampden. On 17 October 2023, Gilmour scored his first career goal in a 4–1 friendly loss to France in Lille.

On 7 June 2024, Gilmour was named in Scotland's squad for the UEFA Euro 2024 finals in Germany. A week later, he came on as a 67th-minute substitute for Callum McGregor in the opening match of the tournament, where Scotland lost 5–1 to hosts Germany. He went on to start against both Switzerland and Hungary as Scotland finished bottom of Group A with one point from three matches. Gilmour gained his 40th Scotland cap on 9 June 2025 as Scotland beat Liechtenstein 4–0 in Vaduz.

Gilmour was named in the Scotland squad for the 2026 FIFA World Cup, but he was forced to withdraw from the squad due to a knee injury sustained in a pre-tournament friendly against Curaçao. He was replaced by Manchester United midfielder Tyler Fletcher.

Gilmour returned to the Scotland side for the 2026–27 Nations League qualifiers in September and October 2026, starting all four matches against Slovenia, Switzerland and North Macedonia. In the final match against Slovenia at Hampden on 6 October, he became the youngest man to reach 50 caps for Scotland (25 years and 117 days), surpassing the record set in September 1990 by Paul McStay (25 years and 325 days).

== Personal life ==
In May 2023, TikTok model Orla Melissa Sloan pleaded guilty to stalking Gilmour and his former Chelsea teammate Mason Mount, as well as harassing Ben Chilwell, another former teammate.

== Career statistics ==
=== Club ===
As of match played 21 November 2026

Appearances and goals by club, season and competition
Club	Season	League			National cup (Note: Includes FA Cup, Coppa Italia)		League cup (Note: Includes EFL Cup)		Europe		Other		Total	
Club	Season	Division	Apps	Goals	Apps	Goals	Apps	Goals	Apps	Goals	Apps	Goals	Apps	Goals
Chelsea U21	2018–19	—			—		—		—		5 (Note: Appearance(s) in EFL Trophy)	0	5	0
Chelsea U21	2019–20	—			—		—		—		2	0	2	0
Chelsea U21	2020–21	—			—		—		—		1	0	1	0
Chelsea U21	Total		—		—		—		—		8	0	8	0
Chelsea	2019–20	Premier League	6	0	3	0	2	0	0	0	0	0	11	0
Chelsea	2020–21	Premier League	5	0	4	0	0	0	2 (Note: Appearances in UEFA Champions League)	0	—		11	0
Chelsea	Total		11	0	7	0	2	0	2	0	0	0	22	0
Norwich City (loan)	2021–22	Premier League	24	0	2	0	2	0	—		—		28	0
Brighton & Hove Albion	2022–23	Premier League	14	0	1	0	2	0	—		—		17	0
Brighton & Hove Albion	2023–24	Premier League	30	0	2	0	1	0	8 (Note: Appearances in UEFA Europa League)	0	—		41	0
Brighton & Hove Albion	2024–25	Premier League	2	0	—		0	0	—		—		2	0
Brighton & Hove Albion	Total		46	0	3	0	3	0	8	0	—		60	0
Napoli	2024–25	Serie A	26	0	2	0	—		—		—		28	0
Napoli	2025–26	Serie A	17	1	0	0	—		3	0	0	0	20	1
Napoli	2026–27	Serie A	9	1	0	0	—		3	0	—		12	1
Napoli	Total		52	2	2	0	—		6	0	0	0	60	2
Career total			133	2	14	0	7	0	16	0	8	0	178	2

=== International ===
As of match played 16 November 2026

Appearances and goals by national team and year
National team	Year	Apps	Goals
Scotland	2021	10	0
Scotland	2022	6	0
Scotland	2023	7	1
Scotland	2024	13	1
Scotland	2025	7	0
Scotland	2026	9	0
Total		52	2

Scores and results list Scotland's goal tally first, score column indicates score after each Gilmour goal.

List of international goals scored by Billy Gilmour
No.	Date	Venue	Cap	Opponent	Score	Result	Competition
1	17 October 2023	Stade Pierre-Mauroy, Villeneuve-d'Ascq, France	22	France	1–0	1–4	Friendly
2	5 September 2024	Hampden Park, Glasgow, Scotland	31	Poland	1–2	2–3	2024–25 UEFA Nations League A

== Honours ==
Chelsea Youth

- U18 Premier League: 2017–18
- FA Youth Cup: 2017–18

Chelsea

- UEFA Champions League: 2020–21
- FA Cup runner-up: 2020–21

Napoli

- Serie A: 2024–25

Individual

- Toulon Tournament Breakthrough of the Tournament: 2018
- Toulon Tournament Best XI: 2018
- Chelsea Academy Player of the Season: 2019–20
