= Rafa Marín =

Spanish footballer (born 2002)

Personal information
- Full name: Rafael Marín Zamora
- Date of birth: 19 May 2002 (age 24)
- Place of birth: Carmona, Spain
- Height: 1.91 m (6 ft 3 in)
- Position: Centre-back

Team information
- Current team: Napoli
- Number: 16

Youth career
- 2009–2013: Alcolea
- 2013–2014: Centro Histórico
- 2014–2016: Sevilla
- 2016–2021: Real Madrid

Senior career*
Years	Team	Apps	(Gls)
2021–2023	Real Madrid B	65	(3)
2023–2024	Real Madrid	0	(0)
2023–2024	→ Alavés (loan)	33	(0)
2024–	Napoli	12	(1)
2025–2026	→ Villarreal (loan)	23	(1)

International career^{‡}
2019	Spain U17	7	(0)
2019–2020	Spain U18	7	(1)
2023–2025	Spain U21	12	(0)
- * Club domestic league appearances and goals as of 20:04, 29 October 2026 (UTC) ‡ National team caps and goals as of 14:21, 20 June 2025 (UTC)

Rafael Marín Zamora (born 19 May 2002) is a Spanish professional footballer who plays as a centre-back for Serie A club Napoli.

== Club career ==
=== Real Madrid ===
Marín made his debut for the Castilla side on 2 May 2021, coming on as a substitute in a 3–1 win over Badajoz. He would later be called up to the senior team for the first time on 22 December 2021, spending the entirety of the match on the bench in a 2–1 victory at Athletic Bilbao in La Liga.

==== Loan to Alavés ====
On 28 July 2023, Marín was sent to Alavés on a season-long loan.

=== Napoli ===
On 10 July 2024, Marín signed for Serie A club Napoli on a five-year contract.

==== Loan to Villarreal ====
On 3 July 2025, Marín returned to Spain after agreeing to a one-year loan deal with Villarreal, with the transfer fee set at €1 million. The Yellow Submarine held a purchase option valued at €15 million, but they decided not to use it and he came back to Napoli for the 2026/2027 season.

== International career ==
Marín has represented Spain at the under-21 level, featuring at the 2025 UEFA European Under-21 Championship in Slovakia.

== Career statistics ==
As of match played 28 October 2026

Appearances and goals by club, season and competition
Club	Season	League			National cup (Note: Includes Copa del Rey, Coppa Italia)		Europe		Other		Total	
Club	Season	Division	Apps	Goals	Apps	Goals	Apps	Goals	Apps	Goals	Apps	Goals
Real Madrid Castilla	2020–21	Segunda División B	2	0	—		—		—		2	0
Real Madrid Castilla	2021–22	Primera División RFEF	27	1	—		—		—		27	1
Real Madrid Castilla	2022–23	Primera Federación	36	2	—		—		4 (Note: Appearances in Primera Federación play-offs)	1	40	3
Real Madrid Castilla	Total		65	3	—		—		4	1	69	4
Alavés (loan)	2023–24	La Liga	33	0	2	0	—		—		35	0
Napoli	2024–25	Serie A	4	0	2	0	—		—		6	0
Napoli	2026–27	Serie A	8	1	0	0	3 (Note: Appearances in UEFA Champions League)	0	—		11	1
Napoli	Total		12	1	2	0	3	0	—		17	1
Villarreal (loan)	2025–26	La Liga	23	1	3	0	5	0	—		31	1
Career total			133	5	7	0	8	0	4	1	152	6

== Honours ==
Napoli

- Serie A: 2024–25
