= Leonardo Spinazzola =

Italian footballer (born 1993)

Leonardo Spinazzola Cavaliere OMRI
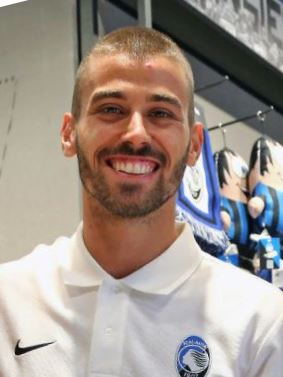
- Spinazzola with Atalanta in 2017

Personal information
- Full name: Leonardo Spinazzola
- Date of birth: 25 March 1993 (age 33)
- Place of birth: Foligno, Umbria, Italy
- Height: 1.86 m (6 ft 1 in)
- Position: Left-back

Team information
- Current team: Napoli
- Number: 37

Youth career
- 1999–2007: Virtus Foligno
- 2007–2012: Siena
- 2010–2012: → Juventus (loan)

Senior career*
Years	Team	Apps	(Gls)
2012–2019	Juventus	10	(0)
2012–2013	→ Empoli (loan)	7	(1)
2013	→ Lanciano (loan)	3	(0)
2013–2014	→ Siena (loan)	24	(1)
2014–2015	→ Atalanta (loan)	2	(0)
2015	→ Vicenza (loan)	10	(0)
2015–2016	→ Perugia (loan)	34	(0)
2016–2018	→ Atalanta (loan)	48	(0)
2019–2024	Roma	104	(5)
2024–	Napoli	62	(4)

International career^{‡}
2011	Italy U19	1	(0)
2012	Italy U20	1	(0)
2017–	Italy	27	(0)
Medal record
Men's Football
Representing Italy
UEFA European Championship
Winner	2020 Europe
CONMEBOL–UEFA Cup of Champions
Runner-up	2022 England
- * Club domestic league appearances and goals as of 23:01, 5 September 2026 (UTC) ‡ National team caps and goals as of 31 March 2026

Leonardo Spinazzola (Italian pronunciation: [leoˈnardo spinatˈtsɔːla]; born 25 March 1993) is an Italian professional footballer who plays as a left wing-back for Serie A club Napoli and the Italy national team.

== Club career ==
=== Early years with Siena and loan spells across Italy from Juventus ===
Born in Foligno, Spinazzola started his career at Siena's youth setup. In 2010, he joined Juventus in a temporary deal, being assigned to the Primavera squad. In June 2012 Juventus signed half of the registration rights for €400,000.

On 5 July 2012 Spinazzola and Filippo Boniperti were loaned to Serie B side Empoli in a season-long loan. On 1 September he played his first match as a professional, coming on as a second-half substitute in a 2–2 away draw against Novara.

Spinazzola scored his first professional goal on the 15th, but in a 2–4 loss at Livorno. After appearing in only seven matches, his loan spell was cut short and he moved to Virtus Lanciano also in a temporary deal in January 2013.

Spinazzola only appeared in three matches with Virtus, all from the bench. On 10 August 2013 he was again loaned, this time to his first club Siena; he appeared regularly with the latter, contributing with 24 matches and one goal for the latter, which narrowly missed out play-offs.

In June 2014 the co-ownership agreement between Siena and Juventus was renewed again. However, after the bankruptcy of Siena in July, Juventus acquired the remaining 50% registration rights of Spinazzola from Siena for free.

On 11 August 2014, Spinazzola joined Serie A side Atalanta also in a loan deal. On 23 August, he made his debut for the club, scoring the last goal of a 2–0 home win against Pisa in the Coppa Italia. Spinazzola made his debut in the Italian top flight on 31 August, replacing Marcelo Estigarribia in the 82nd minute of a 0–0 home draw against Verona. After spells on loan with Vicenza and Perugia, Spinazzola returned to Atalanta in July 2016.

=== Juventus ===
After spending two seasons on loan with Atalanta, Spinazzola returned to Juventus in mid 2018. An ACL injury ruled him out for the first half of the 2018–19 season. On 11 November, Spinazzola played a match for Juventus U19 in which he scored a goal after 35 minutes in a 3–1 away win against Sassuolo U19. Spinazzola made his Juventus debut on 12 January 2019, in a 2–0 away win over Bologna in the Coppa Italia. Prior to his debut for Juventus, Spinazzola had played two matches for Juventus U19. He made his Champions League debut on 12 March, starting in a 3–0 home win over Atlético Madrid, in the round of 16 of the tournament, which enabled Juventus to advance to the quarter-finals 3–2 on aggregate.

=== Roma ===
On 1 July 2019, Spinazzola joined Roma from Juventus for €29.5 million, signing a four-year contract with the club, while Luca Pellegrini moved in the opposite direction. In January 2020, Spinazzola was close to a transfer move to Inter Milan in exchange for Matteo Politano, but the deal collapsed at the last minute as Inter was not entirely satisfied with Spinazzola's physical conditions.

=== Napoli ===
On 10 July 2024, Spinazzola signed for Serie A club Napoli on a free transfer.

== International career ==
On 28 March 2017, Spinazzola made his senior international debut for the Italy national team, along with four other players, coming on as a substitute in a 2–1 friendly away win against the Netherlands.

In June 2021, Spinazzola was included in Italy's squad for UEFA Euro 2020 by manager Roberto Mancini. In the opening match of the tournament on 11 June, a 3–0 win over Turkey, Spinazzola was named man of the match by UEFA for his performance, during which he was credited with an assist on his team's second goal, after his parried shot was scored by Ciro Immobile off the rebound. On 26 June, he assisted the opening goal scored by Federico Chiesa in extra-time on an eventual 2–1 win over Austria in the round of 16, and was also later also involved in the match-winning goal scored by Matteo Pessina; due to his performance, he was named man of the match for the second time in the tournament by UEFA. On 2 July, late in the 2–1 quarter-final win over Belgium, Spinazzola was stretchered off the pitch with an Achilles tendon rupture, ending his time in the tournament. On 5 July, Spinazzola underwent a successful surgery of his left Achilles tendon, by surgeon Lasse Lempainen in Turku, Finland. On 11 July, Spinazzola won the European Championship with Italy following a 3–2 penalty shoot-out victory over England in the final at Wembley Stadium after a 1–1 draw in extra-time. Spinazzola was clocked as the fastest player of the tournament, tied with Hungary's Loïc Négo, reaching a top speed of 33.8 km/h. For his performances, he was included in the team of the tournament.

== Style of play ==
Although naturally right-footed, Spinazzola prefers playing on the left flank, either as a full-back, wing-back, or winger. He is also capable of playing on the right side of the pitch. He is known for his stamina, speed and acceleration, physicality, and his dribbling skills, which enable him to beat his man in one on one situations on the wing with feints or changes of pace. He is also capable of playing the ball first time, cutting into the centre and providing in-swinging crosses to teammates, or providing depth to his team with his attacking runs down the flank. Defensively, he is known for his anticipation and ability in the air. His versatility, characteristics, role, and playing style have drawn comparisons with former Italy and Juventus wing-back Gianluca Zambrotta, whom Spinazzola himself has cited as one of his major influences.

== Personal life ==
In May 2018, Spinazzola and then girlfriend Miriam Sette had a son together. On 24 December 2020, the couple married. In February 2021, the couple had a daughter, their second child together.

== Career statistics ==
=== Club ===
As of match played 5 September 2026

Appearances and goals by club, season and competition
Club	Season	League			Coppa Italia		Europe		Other		Total	
Club	Season	Division	Apps	Goals	Apps	Goals	Apps	Goals	Apps	Goals	Apps	Goals
Juventus	2011–12	Serie A	0	0	0	0	—		—		0	0
Juventus	2018–19	Serie A	10	0	1	0	1 (Note: Appearance(s) in UEFA Champions League)	0	0	0	12	0
Juventus	Total		10	0	1	0	1	0	0	0	12	0
Empoli (loan)	2012–13	Serie B	7	1	1	0	—		—		8	1
Virtus Lanciano (loan)	2012–13	Serie B	3	0	0	0	—		—		3	0
Siena (loan)	2013–14	Serie B	24	1	2	0	—		—		26	1
Atalanta (loan)	2014–15	Serie A	2	0	3	1	—		—		5	1
Vicenza (loan)	2014–15	Serie B	10	0	0	0	—		—		10	0
Perugia (loan)	2015–16	Serie B	34	0	2	0	—		—		36	0
Atalanta (loan)	2016–17	Serie A	30	0	2	0	—		—		32	0
Atalanta (loan)	2017–18	Serie A	18	0	1	0	6 (Note: Appearances in UEFA Europa League)	0	—		25	0
Atalanta (loan)	Total		48	0	3	1	6	0	—		57	1
Roma	2019–20	Serie A	24	1	0	0	8	1	—		32	2
Roma	2020–21	Serie A	27	2	1	0	11	0	—		39	2
Roma	2021–22	Serie A	3	0	0	0	1 (Note: Appearance in UEFA Europa Conference League)	0	—		4	0
Roma	2022–23	Serie A	26	1	1	0	13	1	—		40	2
Roma	2023–24	Serie A	24	1	2	0	10	0	—		36	1
Roma	Total		104	5	4	0	43	2	—		151	7
Napoli	2024–25	Serie A	27	1	3	0	—		—		30	1
Napoli	2025–26	Serie A	32	3	2	0	6	0	2 (Note: Appearances in Supercoppa Italiana)	0	42	3
Napoli	2026–27	Serie A	3	0	0	0	0	0	—		3	0
Napoli	Total		62	4	5	0	6	0	2	0	75	4
Career total			304	11	21	1	56	2	2	0	383	14

=== International ===
As of match played 31 March 2026

Appearances and goals by national team and year
National team	Year	Apps	Goals
Italy	2017	5	0
Italy	2018	0	0
Italy	2019	3	0
Italy	2020	2	0
Italy	2021	8	0
Italy	2022	3	0
Italy	2023	3	0
Italy	2024	0	0
Italy	2025	2	0
Italy	2026	1	0
Total		27	0

== Honours ==
Juventus Youth

- Torneo di Viareggio: 2012

Juventus

- Serie A: 2018–19
- Supercoppa Italiana: 2018

Roma

- UEFA Europa Conference League: 2021–22
- UEFA Europa League runner-up: 2022–23

Napoli

- Serie A: 2024–25
- Supercoppa Italiana: 2025–26

Italy

- UEFA European Championship: 2020

Individual

- UEFA European Championship Team of the Tournament: 2020
- UEFA Europa League Squad of the Season: 2020–21
- Torneo di Viareggio Best Player: 2012

Orders

- 5th Class / Knight: Cavaliere Ordine al Merito della Repubblica Italiana: 2021
