= Matteo Politano =

Italian footballer (born 1993)

Personal information
- Date of birth: 3 August 1993 (age 33)
- Place of birth: Rome, Italy
- Height: 1.71 m (5 ft 7 in)
- Positions: Right winger; right wing-back

Team information
- Current team: Napoli
- Number: 21

Youth career
- 2004–2012: Roma

Senior career*
Years	Team	Apps	(Gls)
2012–2013	Roma	0	(0)
2012–2013	→ Perugia (loan)	28	(8)
2013–2015	Pescara	72	(11)
2015–2019	Sassuolo	96	(20)
2018–2019	→ Inter Milan (loan)	36	(5)
2019–2021	Inter Milan	11	(0)
2020–2021	→ Napoli (loan)	52	(11)
2021–	Napoli	180	(21)

International career^{‡}
2011–2012	Italy U19	3	(0)
2012–2014	Italy U20	7	(3)
2013	Italy U21	2	(0)
2018–	Italy	20	(4)
Medal record
Men's Football
Representing Italy
CONMEBOL–UEFA Cup of Champions
Runner-up	2022 England
- * Club domestic league appearances and goals as of 23:07, 21 November 2026 (UTC) ‡ National team caps and goals as of 31 March 2026

Matteo Politano (Italian pronunciation: [matˈtɛːo poliˈtaːno]; born 3 August 1993) is an Italian professional footballer who plays as a right winger or right wing-back for Serie A club Napoli and the Italy national team.

== Club career ==
=== Roma ===
Of Calabrian origin from Fiumefreddo Bruzio, Politano is a youth product of A.S. Roma, with whom he won the 2010 "Allievi" U17 league, as well as the 2011 Campionato Nazionale Primavera and the 2012 Coppa Italia Primavera. He was the sixth highest scorer of Roma's youth squad in the 2011–12 season (7 goals), behind Junior Tallo, Nicolás López, Gianluca Leonardi, Federico Viviani and Giammario Piscitella. In July 2012, Politano was loaned to Perugia. He made his professional debut in the Coppa Italia. Politano was the starting forward in the 2012–13 Lega Pro Prima Divisione, with 3 goals in first 5 league matches in September.

=== Pescara ===
On 30 June 2013, Pescara signed Politano (€500,000) and Piscitella (€1.5 million) as part of the deal that Caprari returned to Roma (€2 million); however, Caprari returned to Pescara again (€1.5 million) for Piscitella (€1.5 million) in January 2014.

On 27 June 2015, Roma bought back Politano for €601,000, with Caprari moving to Pescara outright for €125,000.

=== Sassuolo ===
On 2 July 2015, Serie A club Sassuolo signed Politano in a temporary deal with an option to purchase. In June 2016, Sassuolo exercised their option to buy Politano.

=== Inter Milan ===
On 30 June 2018, Politano signed for Inter Milan on a season-long loan deal from Sassuolo, with an option to buy in June 2019.

He made his official debut for the club on 19 August in the first match of 2018–19 Serie A against his parent club Sassuolo, which ended in a 1–0 away loss. On 15 September, Politano played his 100th Serie A match in a 1–0 shock loss to Parma at home. Two weeks later, he made his debut in the UEFA Champions League in a 2–1 comeback win over Tottenham Hotspur at San Siro in the first group stage match.

On 29 September, he opened his scoring account for Inter in the league match against Cagliari, netting the second with a long-range strike in a 2–0 home win. During the course of 2018–19 season, Politano was the most used out-field player, having made 48 appearances in all competitions; only goalkeeper Samir Handanović playing more than him. As a result, on 19 June 2019 Inter exercised their option to buy Politano from Sassuolo.

However, with the appointment of head coach Antonio Conte and subsequent switch of formation from 4–3–3 to 3–5–2, Politano soon lost his place in the team's usual starting line-up. In January 2020, Politano passed the medical at Roma and was due to be exchanged for Leonardo Spinazzola yet the transfer collapsed as Inter were not entirely satisfied with Spinazzola's physical conditions and failed at re-negotiation of the deal.

=== Napoli ===
On 28 January 2020, Politano moved to Napoli on a two-year loan with an obligation to make deal permanent. On 29 October 2020, he scored the only goal in a 1–0 away win over Real Sociedad in the 2020–21 UEFA Europa League.

== International career ==
Politano received his first Italy U19 call-up against the Italy U20 "C" side in December 2011. He then played two times during the team's 2012 UEFA European Under-19 Football Championship elite qualification campaign (featuring as a substitute for Elio De Silvestro) and appeared in two friendlies before the elite round of the competition.

On 5 November 2016, Politano was called up to the senior squad for the first time for the 2018 FIFA World Cup qualification match against Liechtenstein and a friendly match against Germany by manager Gian Piero Ventura. He later made his senior international debut for the national team on 28 May 2018, under manager Roberto Mancini, starting for Italy in a 2–1 friendly win over Saudi Arabia. On 20 November 2018, he scored his first goal for Italy on his second cap in the 94th minute of a 1–0 friendly match win over the United States, held in Genk.

== Style of play ==
Politano is a left-footed player who primarily plays as a winger on either flank. He can also play in other attacking positions, including as a second striker.[12][26] He is noted for his pace, dribbling, passing and long-range shooting.[12][27]

== Personal life ==
Politano got married in June 2018 to Silvia Di Vincenzo, he later became engaged to PR Ginevra Sozzi. On June 17, 2021, their first daughter, Giselle, was born.

== Career statistics ==
=== Club ===
As of match played 21 November 2026

Appearances and goals by club, season and competition
Club	Season	League			Coppa Italia		Europe		Other		Total	
Club	Season	Division	Apps	Goals	Apps	Goals	Apps	Goals	Apps	Goals	Apps	Goals
Perugia (loan)	2012–13	Lega Pro	28	8	3	0	—		4 (Note: Appearances in Lega Pro promotion play-offs)	2	35	10
Pescara	2013–14	Serie B	31	6	1	0	—		—		32	6
Pescara	2014–15	Serie B	41	5	3	0	—		5 (Note: Appearances in Serie B promotion play-offs)	1	49	6
Pescara	Total		72	11	4	0	—		5	1	81	12
Sassuolo	2015–16	Serie A	28	5	1	0	—		—		29	5
Sassuolo	2016–17	Serie A	32	5	1	0	9 (Note: Appearances in UEFA Europa League)	3	—		42	8
Sassuolo	2017–18	Serie A	36	10	3	1	—		—		39	11
Sassuolo	Total		96	20	5	1	9	3	—		110	24
Inter Milan (loan)	2018–19	Serie A	36	5	2	0	10 (Note: Six appearances in UEFA Champions League, four appearances and one goal in UEFA Europa League)	1	—		48	6
Inter Milan	2019–20	Serie A	11	0	0	0	4 (Note: Appearances in UEFA Champions League)	0	—		15	0
Inter Milan	Inter total		47	5	2	0	14	1	—		63	6
Napoli (loan)	2019–20	Serie A	15	2	3	0	2	0	—		20	2
Napoli (loan)	2020–21	Serie A	37	9	4	1	8	1	1 (Note: Appearance(s) in Supercoppa Italiana)	0	50	11
Napoli	2021–22	Serie A	33	3	1	0	5	2	—		39	5
Napoli	2022–23	Serie A	27	3	1	0	9	1	—		37	4
Napoli	2023–24	Serie A	37	8	1	0	8	1	2	0	48	9
Napoli	2024–25	Serie A	37	3	2	0	—		—		39	3
Napoli	2025–26	Serie A	34	2	2	0	6	0	2	0	44	2
Napoli	2026–27	Serie A	12	2	0	0	4	1	—		16	3
Napoli	Napoli total		232	32	14	1	42	6	5	0	293	39
Career total			475	76	28	2	65	10	14	3	582	91

=== International ===
As of match played 31 March 2026

Appearances and goals by national team and year
National team	Year	Apps	Goals
Italy	2018	2	1
Italy	2019	1	0
Italy	2020	0	0
Italy	2021	1	2
Italy	2022	4	0
Italy	2023	4	0
Italy	2024	0	0
Italy	2025	6	1
Italy	2026	2	0
Total		20	4

Scores and results list Italy's goal tally first.

List of international goals scored by Matteo Politano
No.	Date	Venue	Opponent	Score	Result	Competition
1.	20 November 2018	Luminus Arena, Genk, Belgium	United States	1–0	1–0	Friendly
2.	28 May 2021	Sardegna Arena, Cagliari, Italy	San Marino	3–0	7–0	Friendly
3.	28 May 2021	Sardegna Arena, Cagliari, Italy	San Marino	6–0	7–0	Friendly
4.	8 September 2025	Nagyerdei Stadion, Debrecen, Hungary	Israel	3–2	5–4	2026 FIFA World Cup qualification

== Honours ==
Napoli

- Serie A: 2022–23, 2024–25
- Coppa Italia: 2019–20
- Supercoppa Italiana: 2025–26

Individual

- Serie A Goal of the Month: April 2024
