= Frank Anguissa =

Cameroonian footballer (born 1995)

André-Frank Zambo Anguissa
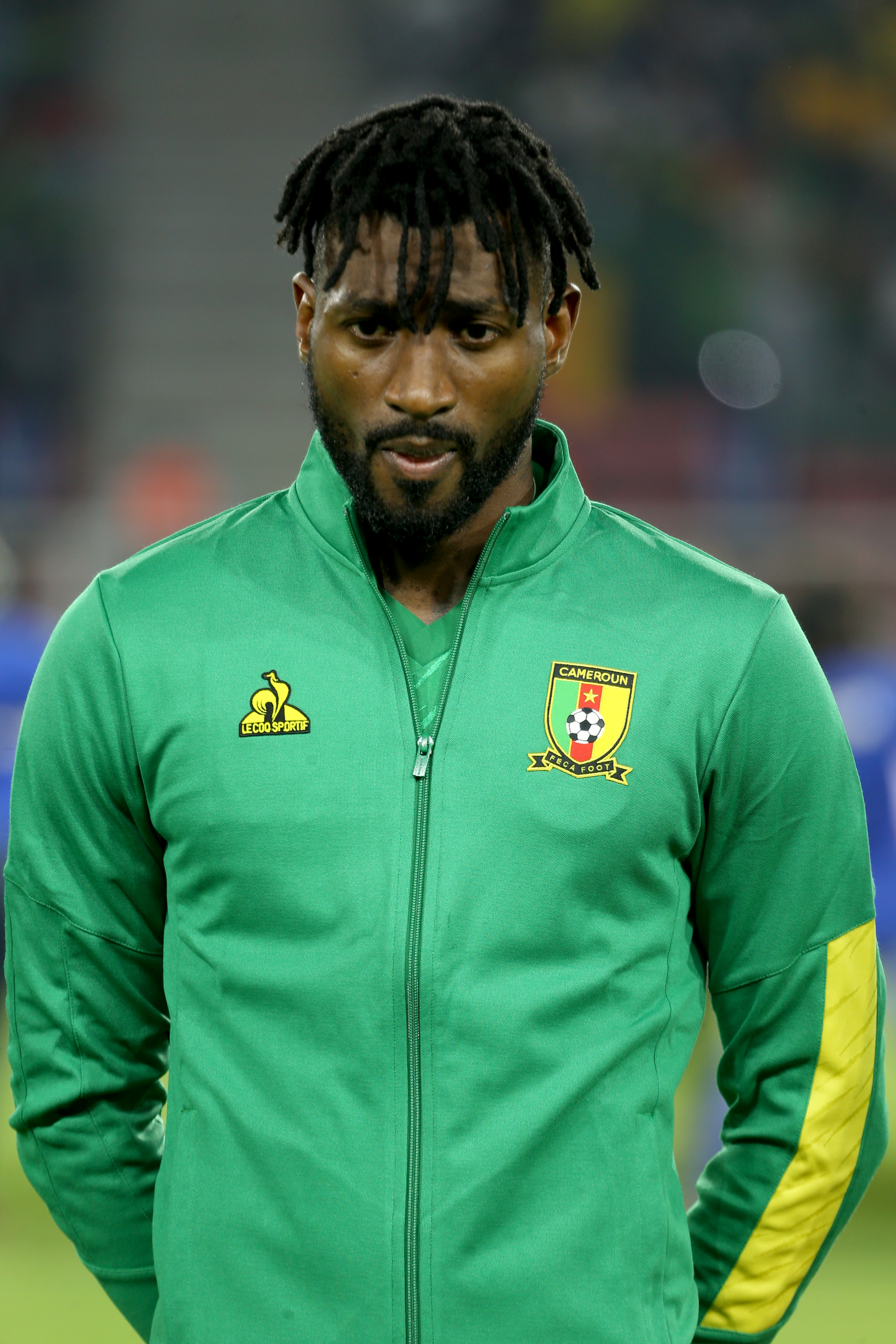
- Zambo Anguissa with Cameroon at the 2021 Africa Cup of Nations

Personal information
- Full name: André-Frank Zambo Anguissa
- Date of birth: 16 November 1995 (age 31)
- Place of birth: Yaoundé, Cameroon
- Height: 1.84 m (6 ft 0 in)
- Position: Central midfielder

Team information
- Current team: Napoli
- Number: 99

Youth career
- 2004–2013: Fortuna
- 2013–2014: Coton Sport
- 2014–2015: → Reims (loan)

Senior career*
Years	Team	Apps	(Gls)
2015–2018	Marseille	79	(0)
2018–2022	Fulham	61	(0)
2019–2020	→ Villarreal (loan)	36	(2)
2021–2022	→ Napoli (loan)	25	(0)
2022–	Napoli	132	(14)

International career^{‡}
2017–2026	Cameroon	67	(5)
Medal record
Men's football
Representing Cameroon
Africa Cup of Nations
Third place	2021 Cameroon
- * Club domestic league appearances and goals as of 23:14, 21 November 2026 (UTC) ‡ National team caps and goals as of 23:38, 13 October 2025 (UTC)

André-Frank Zambo Anguissa (born 16 November 1995), commonly known as Frank Anguissa, is a Cameroonian professional footballer who plays as a central midfielder for Serie A club Napoli and the Cameroon national team.

== Early life ==
Zambo Anguissa was born on 16 November 1995 in Yaoundé to Louis and Juliette Anguissa. He is one of six children. Anguissa also holds French nationality from his mother.

== Club career ==
=== Early career ===
Zambo Anguissa began his career in Coton Sport, a club in his native country. He was loaned to French club Reims in 2014, where he mostly played for their reserves team. Reims was given the opportunity to sign him at the end of the 2014–15 season, but decided against it.

=== Marseille ===
After going on trials at Valenciennes and Marseille, Zambo Anguissa joined Marseille on 31 July 2015, when he signed his first professional contract. He made his first team debut on 17 September 2015 in the UEFA Europa League against FC Groningen, where he provided an assist in a 3–0 victory for Marseille. Three days later, he made his Ligue 1 debut against Lyon.

On 16 May 2018, Zambo Anguissa played in the 2018 UEFA Europa League final, lost against Atlético Madrid at the Parc Olympique Lyonnais in Lyon, France.

=== Fulham ===
==== 2018–19: Debut season ====
On 9 August 2018, Fulham signed Zambo Anguissa on a then-club record transfer fee. He made his debut in a 3–1 defeat against Tottenham Hotspur.

==== 2019–20: Loan to Villarreal ====
He was loaned to Villarreal in July 2019 following Fulham's relegation from the Premier League. He made his Villarreal debut on 17 August, playing the full 90 minutes in a 4–4 home draw against Granada.

==== 2021–22: Contract extension and loan to Napoli ====
On 31 August 2021, Zambo Anguissa signed a new three-year contract with the Championship club before heading out on loan to Napoli for the 2021–22 season.

=== Napoli ===
On 26 May 2022, Napoli purchased Zambo Anguissa's rights from Fulham. On 7 September, he scored his first Champions League goal in a 4–1 win over Liverpool. On 1 October, he scored his first Serie A goals, by netting a brace in a 3–1 win over Torino. At the end of the season, Zambo Anguissa and Napoli won the Serie A title for the first time in 33 years.

== International career ==
=== 2017: Debut and FIFA Confederations Cup ===
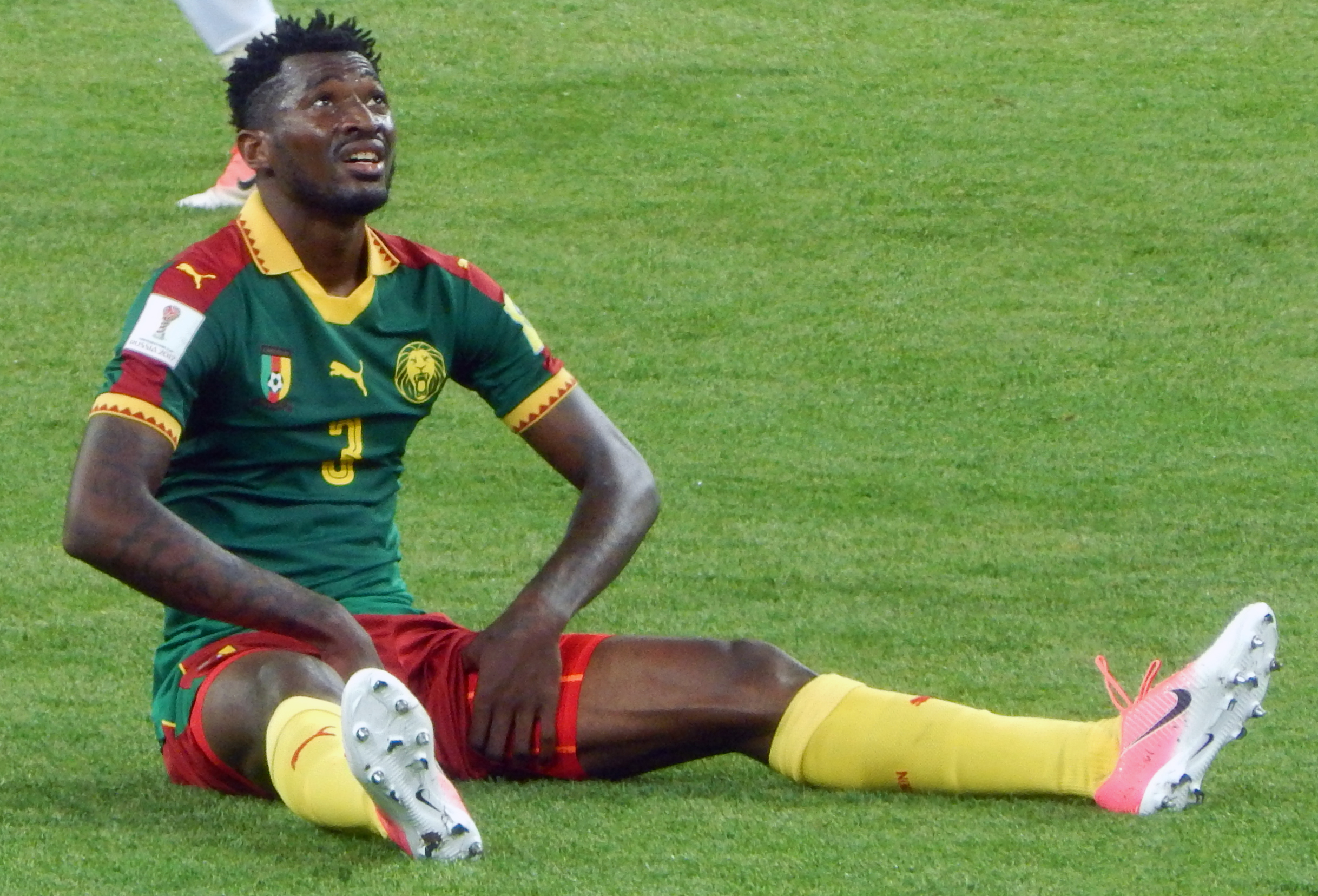
Zambo Anguissa playing against Chile at the 2017 FIFA Confederations Cup

Zambo Anguissa made his international debut for the Cameroon national team in a friendly 1–0 win over Tunisia on 24 March 2017.

Zambo Anguissa was included in the Indomitable Lions' squad for the 2017 FIFA Confederations Cup in Russia. He would score his first international goal in Cameroon's 1–1 group stage draw against Australia, where he also won the man of the match award for his performance.

=== 2019–2022: First and second Africa Cup of Nations and FIFA World Cup ===
In June 2019, Zambo Anguissa was named to Cameroon's squad for the 2019 Africa Cup of Nations in Egypt. He would also feature at the 2021 tournament, in which Cameroon were hosts and finished in third place.

At the end of the 2022 calendar year, Zambo Anguissa would be called up by new national team manager Rigobert Song to Cameroon's squad for the 2022 FIFA World Cup in Qatar. He played in all three group stage matches as his side failed to progress to the second round.

=== 2023–present: Third Africa Cup of Nations and assuming the captaincy ===
On 29 December 2023, Zambo Anguissa was included in the 27-man squad for the 2023 Africa Cup of Nations.

== Style of play ==
His style of play is definitely robust, highlighted by a dominant aerial presence and a high duel win rate. However, Anguissa's progressive carrying is notably lower, which suggests he does not frequently advance the ball through dribbling but favours a play style rooted in stability and distribution.

== Career statistics ==
=== Club ===
As of match played 21 November 2026

Appearances and goals by club, season and competition
Club	Season	League			National cup (Note: Includes Coupe de France, FA Cup, Copa del Rey, Coppa Italia)		League cup (Note: Includes Coupe de la Ligue, EFL Cup)		Europe		Other		Total	
Club	Season	Division	Apps	Goals	Apps	Goals	Apps	Goals	Apps	Goals	Apps	Goals	Apps	Goals
Marseille	2015–16	Ligue 1	9	0	1	0	2	0	1 (Note: Appearances in UEFA Europa League)	0	—		13	0
Marseille	2016–17	Ligue 1	33	0	3	0	1	0	—		—		37	0
Marseille	2017–18	Ligue 1	37	0	2	0	1	0	16	0	—		56	0
Marseille	Total		79	0	6	0	4	0	17	0	—		106	0
Fulham	2018–19	Premier League	22	0	0	0	3	0	—		—		25	0
Fulham	2020–21	Premier League	36	0	1	0	1	0	—		—		38	0
Fulham	2021–22	Championship	3	0	0	0	0	0	—		—		3	0
Fulham	Total		61	0	1	0	4	0	—		—		66	0
Villarreal (loan)	2019–20	La Liga	36	2	3	0	—		—		—		39	2
Napoli (loan)	2021–22	Serie A	25	0	0	0	—		5	0	—		30	0
Napoli	2022–23	Serie A	36	3	1	0	—		8 (Note: Appearances in UEFA Champions League)	1	—		45	4
Napoli	2023–24	Serie A	34	0	0	0	—		7	1	0	0	41	1
Napoli	2024–25	Serie A	35	6	2	0	—		—		—		37	6
Napoli	2025–26	Serie A	18	4	0	0	—		4	0	0	0	22	4
Napoli	2026–27	Serie A	9	1	0	0	—		2	0	—		11	1
Napoli	Napoli total		157	14	3	0	—		26	2	0	0	186	16
Career total			330	16	13	0	8	0	43	2	0	0	394	18

=== International ===
As of match played 13 October 2025

Appearances and goals by national team and year
National team	Year	Apps	Goals
Cameroon	2017	11	2
Cameroon	2018	4	0
Cameroon	2019	9	0
Cameroon	2020	2	1
Cameroon	2021	9	2
Cameroon	2022	11	0
Cameroon	2023	5	0
Cameroon	2024	12	0
Cameroon	2025	4	0
Total		67	5

Scores and results list Cameroon's goal tally first.

List of international goals scored by André-Frank Zambo Anguissa
No.	Date	Venue	Opponent	Score	Result	Competition
1	22 June 2017	Krestovsky Stadium, Saint Petersburg, Russia	Australia	1–0	1–1	2017 FIFA Confederations Cup
2	11 November 2017	Levy Mwanawasa Stadium, Ndola, Zambia	Zambia	1–1	2–2	2018 FIFA World Cup qualification
3	12 November 2020	Stade de la Réunification, Douala, Cameroon	Mozambique	3–0	4–1	2021 Africa Cup of Nations qualification
4	4 June 2021	Stadion Wiener Neustadt, Wiener Neustadt, Austria	Nigeria	1–0	1–0	Friendly
5	13 November 2021	Orlando Stadium, Johannesburg, South Africa	Malawi	2–0	4–0	2022 FIFA World Cup qualification

== Honours ==
Marseille

- UEFA Europa League runner-up: 2017–18

Napoli

- Serie A: 2022–23, 2024–25

Cameroon

- Africa Cup of Nations third place: 2021

Individual

- CAF Team of the Year: 2023
- Serie A Player of the Month: January 2025, October 2025

== See also ==
- List of Olympique de Marseille players
- List of Fulham F.C. players
- List of SSC Napoli players
