= Coli Saco =

Malian footballer (born 2002)

Personal information
- Date of birth: 15 May 2002 (age 24)
- Place of birth: Créteil, France
- Height: 1.97 m (6 ft 6 in)
- Position: Central midfielder

Team information
- Current team: Riga
- Number: 6

Youth career
- 2017–2018: Le Havre
- 2018–2020: Sochaux
- 2020–2021: AC Milan
- 2021–2022: Napoli

Senior career*
Years	Team	Apps	(Gls)
2022–2026	Napoli	0	(0)
2022–2023	→ Pro Vercelli (loan)	34	(3)
2023–2024	→ Ancona (loan)	32	(7)
2024–2025	→ Bari (loan)	11	(0)
2025–2026	→ Yverdon-Sport (loan)	8	(0)
2026	→ Casertana (loan)	11	(1)
2026–	Riga	8	(0)

International career^{‡}
2023–2024	Mali U23	8	(0)
Medal record
Representing Mali
U-23 Africa Cup of Nations
Bronze medal – third place	Morocco 2023	U-23 Team
- * Club domestic league appearances and goals as of 12 November 2026 ‡ National team caps and goals as of 30 July 2024

Coli Saco (born 15 May 2002) is a professional footballer who plays as a central midfielder for Latvian Higher League club Riga. Born in France, Saco has represented Mali at under-23 level.

== Club career ==
=== Early years ===
Born in Créteil, Saco joined Le Havre's youth sector in 2017, aged 15, before moving to Sochaux one year later. He then came through the youth ranks of the Lionceaux, taking part in the 2019–20 Coupe Gambardella, where Sochaux reached the round of 16 before the competition was cancelled, due to the emergency caused by the COVID-19 pandemic.

In October 2020, Saco entered AC Milan's academy; however, he was released after just one season, having not managed to break into the under-19 team consistently.

=== Napoli ===
In September 2021, he officially joined fellow Italian club Napoli after a successful trial.

Having impressed with his performances for Napoli's under-19 squad, during the 2021–22 season Saco started training with the first team, under manager Luciano Spalletti. The midfielder originally received his first official call-up to the senior team for a Serie A match against Juventus on 6 January 2022: however, having tested positive for COVID-19, he eventually had to withdraw from the match-day squad.

==== Loan to Pro Vercelli ====
On 15 July 2022, Saco joined Serie C side Pro Vercelli on a season-long loan. He then made his professional debut for the club on 3 September, starting and playing 90 minutes in a 1–0 league win against Padova. On 5 November, he scored his first professional goal in a 3–1 league loss against AlbinoLeffe.

==== Loan to Ancona ====
On 1 September 2023, Saco joined fellow Serie C club Ancona on loan for the remainder of the season.

==== Loan to Bari ====
On 30 August 2024, Saco moved on loan to Bari in Serie B.

==== Loan to Casertana ====
On 26 January 2026, Saco joined Casertana in Serie C on loan.

== International career ==
In June 2023, Saco was included in the final squad of the Malian under-23 national team for the 2023 U-23 Africa Cup of Nations, hosted in Morocco, where the Eagles finished in third place and qualified for the 2024 Summer Olympics in Paris.

In July 2024, he was included by head coach Aliou Badra Diallo in the Malian squad for the men's football tournament at the Summer Olympics in Paris, where The Eagles were eventually eliminated in the group stage.

== Style of play ==
Saco is a left-footed midfielder, who has been mainly regarded for his physical attributes, which allow him to win many headers and keep possession. Despite his slow pace, he has proved to have good abilities in reading the game and finding goal opportunities, thanks to his off-the-ball movement and his heading. He has also been noticed for his vision and his long-range passing prowess.

Although he has been compared to André-Frank Zambo Anguissa, he cited Paul Pogba and Yaya Touré as his main sources of inspiration.

== Personal life ==
Born in France, Saco is of Malian descent.

== Career statistics ==
=== Club ===
As of match played 4 May 2024

Appearances and goals by club, season and competition
Club	Season	League			Cup		Europe		Other		Total	
Club	Season	Division	Apps	Goals	Apps	Goals	Apps	Goals	Apps	Goals	Apps	Goals
Napoli	2022–23	Serie A	0	0	0	0	0	0	—		0	0
Pro Vercelli (loan)	2022–23	Serie C	34	3	0	0	—		—		34	3
Ancona (loan)	2023–24	Serie C	31	7	0	0	—		—		31	7
Career total			65	10	0	0	0	0	0	0	65	10

== Honours ==
Mali U23

- U-23 Africa Cup of Nations bronze medal: 2023
