= Francesco Mezzoni =

Italian footballer (born 2000)

Personal information
- Date of birth: 24 July 2000 (age 26)
- Place of birth: Rome, Italy
- Height: 1.81 m (5 ft 11 in)
- Position: Midfielder

Team information
- Current team: Virtus Entella
- Number: 94

Youth career
- 2010–2013: ASD Orange
- 2013–2017: Carpi
- 2017–2019: Napoli

Senior career*
Years	Team	Apps	(Gls)
2016–2017	Carpi	0	(0)
2019–2025	Napoli	0	(0)
2019–2020	→ Carrarese (loan)	13	(1)
2020	→ Pontedera (loan)	4	(0)
2020–2021	→ Feralpisalò (loan)	8	(0)
2021	→ Pro Vercelli (loan)	9	(0)
2021–2022	→ Pistoiese (loan)	27	(1)
2022–2023	→ Ancona (loan)	35	(0)
2023–2024	→ Perugia (loan)	30	(2)
2024–2025	→ Perugia (loan)	28	(2)
2025–	Virtus Entella	27	(0)

International career^{‡}
2018	Italy U18	1	(0)
- * Club domestic league appearances and goals as of 13 May 2026 ‡ National team caps and goals as of 7 February 2018

Francesco Mezzoni (born 24 July 2000) is an Italian professional footballer who plays as a midfielder for Serie B club Virtus Entella.

== Club career ==
=== Carpi ===
He spent his youth years at Carpi and was called up for the senior squad on several occasions during 2016–17 Serie B and 2017–18 Serie B seasons, but did not see any field time.

=== Napoli ===
On 31 August 2017, he joined Serie A club Napoli. For the next two seasons, he played for the club's Under-19 squad in Campionato Primavera 1 and UEFA Youth League, without any call-ups to the senior squad.

==== Loan to Carrarese ====
On 1 August 2019, he joined Serie C club Carrarese on loan.

He made his professional Serie C debut for Carrarese on 24 August 2019 in a game against Pontedera, playing the whole game. He finished the loan with 13 league appearances, 8 of them as a starter, and 1 goal.

==== Loan to Pontedera ====
On 30 January 2020, he moved on loan to Pontedera. He played in 4 games (3 as a starter) before Serie C season was abandoned due to the COVID-19 pandemic in Italy.

==== Loan to Feralpisalò ====
On 17 September 2020, he joined Feralpisalò on loan.

==== Loan to Pro Vercelli ====
On 8 January 2021, he joined Pro Vercelli on loan.

==== Loan to Pistoiese ====
On 31 August 2021, he was loaned to Pistoiese.

==== Loan to Ancona ====
On 14 July 2022, Mezzoni moved on loan to Ancona.

==== Loans to Perugia ====
On 10 August 2023, Mezzoni joined Perugia on loan.

Mezzoni was included in Napoli's matchday squad for the first time since signing in the first three games of the 2024–25 season; however, he remained on the bench. On 30 August 2024, he returned to Perugia on a new loan.

=== Virtus Entella ===
For the 2025–26 season, Mezzoni signed with Virtus Entella in Serie B.

== International career ==
He first represented his country with the Under-18 squad on 7 February 2018 in a friendly against France.
