= Antonio Cioffi =

Italian footballer (born 2002)

Personal information
- Date of birth: 19 December 2002 (age 23)
- Place of birth: Maddaloni, Italy
- Height: 1.80 m (5 ft 11 in)
- Position: Forward

Team information
- Current team: Latina (on loan from Napoli)
- Number: 77

Youth career
- –2012: ASD Oasi San Feliciana
- 2012–2020: Napoli

Senior career*
Years	Team	Apps	(Gls)
2021–2026	Napoli	1	(0)
2022–2023	→ Pontedera (loan)	31	(6)
2023–2024	→ Ancona (loan)	29	(0)
2024–2025	→ Rimini (loan)	25	(3)
2025–2026	→ Livorno (loan)	18	(2)
2026	→ Latina (loan)	17	(0)
2026–	Latina	1	(0)
- * Club domestic league appearances and goals as of 18 August 2026

Antonio Cioffi (born 19 December 2002) is an Italian professional footballer who plays as a forward for Serie C Group B club Latina.

== Early life ==
Cioffi was born in Maddaloni in Campania, growing up in San Felice a Cancello, where he started playing football before joining Napoli's academy in 2012.

== Club career ==
After coming through Napoli's youth ranks, Cioffi was called to the first team by Gennaro Gattuso as he had just turned 18, in the very early days of January 2021.

After featuring on the bench several times, he made his professional debut for Napoli on 17 January 2021, coming in as a substitute of Lorenzo Insigne in the 6–0 Serie A win against Fiorentina.

In the following season, while he mostly featured for the Under-19 squad, Cioffi also made his debut in Coppa Italia on 13 January 2022, as he took the place of Stanislav Lobotka in the injury time of the match against Fiorentina, as his side eventually suffered a 2–5 loss after extra time.

On 9 July 2022, Cioffi was officially sent on a season-long loan to Serie C club Pontedera.

On 22 July 2024, Cioffi joined Serie C club Rimini on a season-long loan.

On 11 August 2025, Cioffi joined Livorno on a season long loan.

On 15 August 2026 Cioffi joined Latina on a permanent dela, after having been on loan for the last part of the 2025-2026 season).
