= Stanislav Lobotka =

Slovak footballer (born 1994)

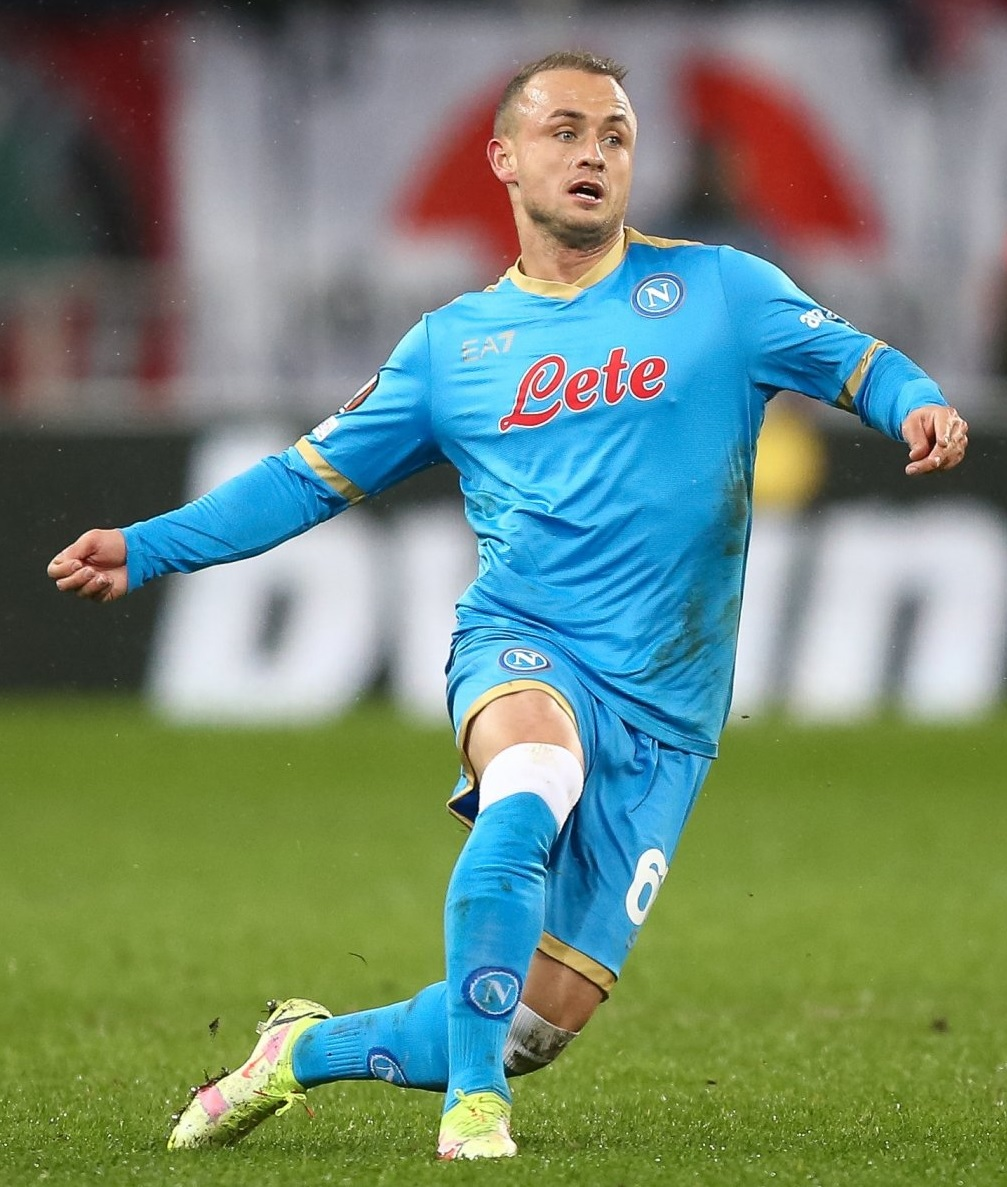
- Lobotka playing for Napoli in 2021

Personal information
- Full name: Stanislav Lobotka
- Date of birth: 25 November 1994 (age 31)
- Place of birth: Trenčín, Slovakia
- Height: 1.68 m (5 ft 6 in)
- Position: Defensive midfielder

Team information
- Current team: Napoli
- Number: 68

Youth career
- TJ Družstevník Veľká Hradná
- AAC Sparta Trenčín
- AS Trenčín

Senior career*
Years	Team	Apps	(Gls)
2011–2015	AS Trenčín	76	(3)
2013–2014	→ Jong Ajax (loan)	30	(3)
2015–2017	Nordsjælland	61	(0)
2017–2020	Celta Vigo	86	(0)
2020–	Napoli	201	(4)

International career^{‡}
2011–2012	Slovakia U18	3	(1)
2012–2013	Slovakia U19	6	(1)
2015	Slovakia U20	1	(0)
2013–2017	Slovakia U21	27	(2)
2016–	Slovakia	76	(4)
- * Club domestic league appearances and goals as of 18:43, 28 October 2026 (UTC) ‡ National team caps and goals as of 11:50, 4 October 2026 (UTC)

Stanislav Lobotka (Slovak pronunciation: [ˈstaɲislaw ˈlɔbɔtka]; born 25 November 1994) is a Slovak professional footballer who plays as a defensive midfielder for Serie A club Napoli and the Slovakia national team.

== Club career ==
=== AS Trenčín ===
Lobotka made his Corgoň Liga debut for AS Trenčín against FK Dukla Banská Bystrica on 4 March 2012.

==== Ajax (loan) ====
Lobotka joined AFC Ajax for the 2013–14 season on 30 June 2013 on a one-year loan with option to buy. He played his first match for Ajax on 13 July 2013 in a pre-season friendly encounter against RKC Waalwijk. He came on as a 60th minute substitute for Christian Eriksen in the 5–1 win in Waalwijk at the Mandemakers Stadion.

=== Nordsjælland ===
Stanislav Lobotka came to FC Nordsjælland in August shortly before the transfer window closed, and made his debut against Brøndby on 30 August 2015. Lobotka entered as a regular on the midfield, and in his first season has played all the matches except for one because of illness. The 21-year-old Slovak was voted player of the year in his first season at the FCN Awards. In 2017, he was again voted club's player of the year after another great season.

=== Celta Vigo ===
On 15 July 2017, Lobotka joined Celta on a five-year deal.

On 3 June 2019, Lobotka admitted that after Celta's unsuccessful season, he was open to a transfer, looking to find a club set to play in European competitions next season. According to Pravda, Lobotka also claimed that he was aware of an interest from other Spanish and German clubs.

=== Napoli ===
On 15 January 2020, Lobotka signed for Serie A club Napoli, for a reported €24m deal until 2024. On 18 January 2020, Lobotka was benched in his first possible fixture against Fiorentina in a 0–2 defeat. Instead, he made a brief, 22-minute appearance in the 2019–20 Coppa Italia against Lazio, being featured in the starting line-up. Lobotka had to be replaced early due to tactical changes following Elseid Hysaj's red card, but witnessed an early winning goal by Lorenzo Insigne in the second minute.

Lobotka made his league debut against table-leaders Juventus on 26 January 2020. He came on as a replacement for Diego Demme, who was booked with a yellow card in the first half. Napoli managed to earn an upset victory over the favourites, by winning 2–1, with goals scored by Piotr Zieliński and Lorenzo Insigne. Cristiano Ronaldo's stoppage time goal did not change the result. He had his first league start in the next round, in a 4–2 away victory at Stadio Luigi Ferraris against Sampdoria. Lobotka played for over an hour and was replaced by Diego Demme, as Napoli led 2–1, after goals by Arkadiusz Milik and Eljif Elmas. Demme went on to score the third goal and Dries Mertens sealed the win in stoppage time.

Lobotka had also been added to Napoli's UEFA Champions League squad, thus making him eligible to participate in the Round of 16 fixtures against Barcelona. The first competitive set of fixtures between the clubs was also dubbed by the Maradona derby.

== International career ==
Having represented various youth Slovak teams, Lobotka was called up to the senior Slovakia squad for matches against Lithuania and Austria. On 15 November 2016, he debuted in the latter friendly match alongside Matúš Bero and Albert Rusnák.

Later, Lobotka was called up to multiple fixtures, but had to wait for his competitive debut until 1 September 2017, for a 2018 FIFA World Cup qualifier against Slovenia. He played the entire match being a valuable midfielder, fulfilling the expectations following the successful performances of Lobotka and Slovakia U21 at the 2017 UEFA European Under-21 Championship, as well as his move to Celta Vigo. His performance contributed to Slovakia's 1-0 home victory.

On 4 September 2017, Lobotka scored his first international goal for the Slovak senior team, becoming the first to score at Wembley, in a qualifier against England. He scored after he tackled and took the ball from Marcus Rashford and exchanged a pass with Adam Nemec, before beating Joe Hart in the 3rd minute of the match. However, Slovakia went on to lose the game 1-2, after goals by Eric Dier and Rashford. The 8th game of the campaign was a direct battle for the 1st place in qualifying Group F. Similarly, like after the previous game, Lobotka received praise for his performance. By the end of the year, he scored again in a friendly match against Norway in the 93rd minute, providing Slovakia a 1-0 victory in a final international game of Ján Ďurica.

Lobotka was included in the 26-man squad for the UEFA Euro 2024. He went on to win the Man of the Match in the opening fixture win by 1–0 against Belgium.

== Career statistics ==
=== Club ===
As of match played 28 October 2026

Appearances and goals by club, season and competition
Club	Season	League			National cup (Note: Includes Slovak Cup, Danish Cup, Copa del Rey, Coppa Italia)		Europe		Other		Total	
Club	Season	Division	Apps	Goals	Apps	Goals	Apps	Goals	Apps	Goals	Apps	Goals
Trenčín	2010–11	Slovak 2. Liga	2	0	0	0	—		—		2	0
Trenčín	2011–12	Slovak First League	5	0	0	0	—		—		5	0
Trenčín	2012–13	Slovak First League	31	2	0	0	—		—		31	2
Trenčín	2014–15	Slovak First League	32	1	4	0	4 (Note: Appearances in UEFA Europa League)	0	—		40	1
Trenčín	2015–16	Slovak First League	6	0	0	0	2 (Note: Appearance(s) in UEFA Champions League)	0	—		8	0
Trenčín	Total		76	3	4	0	6	0	—		86	3
Jong Ajax (loan)	2013–14	Eerste Divisie	30	3	0	0	—		—		30	3
Nordsjælland	2015–16	Danish Superliga	26	0	0	0	—		—		26	0
Nordsjælland	2016–17	Danish Superliga	35	0	1	0	—		—		36	0
Nordsjælland	Total		61	0	1	0	—		—		62	0
Celta Vigo	2017–18	La Liga	38	0	3	0	—		—		41	0
Celta Vigo	2018–19	La Liga	31	0	1	0	—		—		32	0
Celta Vigo	2019–20	La Liga	17	0	0	0	—		—		17	0
Celta Vigo	Total		86	0	4	0	—		—		90	0
Napoli	2019–20	Serie A	14	0	1	0	1	0	—		16	0
Napoli	2020–21	Serie A	15	0	3	0	5	0	0	0	23	0
Napoli	2021–22	Serie A	23	1	1	0	2	0	—		26	1
Napoli	2022–23	Serie A	38	1	1	0	10	0	—		49	1
Napoli	2023–24	Serie A	38	0	1	0	8	0	2 (Note: Appearances in Supercoppa Italiana)	0	49	0
Napoli	2024–25	Serie A	32	0	3	0	—		—		35	0
Napoli	2025–26	Serie A	32	1	1	0	6	0	2	0	41	1
Napoli	2026–27	Serie A	9	1	0	0	3	0	—		12	1
Napoli	Total		201	4	11	0	35	0	4	0	251	4
Career total			454	10	20	0	41	0	4	0	519	10

=== International ===
As of match played 2 October 2026

Appearances and goals by national team and year
National team	Year	Apps	Goals
Slovakia	2016	1	0
Slovakia	2017	6	2
Slovakia	2018	7	0
Slovakia	2019	8	1
Slovakia	2020	5	0
Slovakia	2021	7	0
Slovakia	2022	9	0
Slovakia	2023	9	1
Slovakia	2024	13	0
Slovakia	2025	6	0
Slovakia	2026	5	0
Total		76	4

Slovakia's score listed first, score column indicates score after each Lobotka goal.

International goals by date, venue, cap, opponent, score, result and competition
No.	Date	Venue	Cap	Opponent	Score	Result	Competition
1	4 September 2017	Wembley Stadium, London, England	3	England	1–0	1–2	2018 FIFA World Cup qualification
2	14 November 2017	Štadión Antona Malatinského, Trnava, Slovakia	7	Norway	1–0	1–0	Friendly
3	11 June 2019	Bakcell Arena, Baku, Azerbaijan	17	Azerbaijan	1–0	5–1	UEFA Euro 2020 qualification
4	13 October 2023	Estádio do Dragão, Porto, Portugal	50	Portugal	2–3	2–3	UEFA Euro 2024 qualification

== Honours ==
AS Trenčín

- Slovak First Football League: 2014–15
- Slovak Cup: 2014–15

Napoli

- Serie A: 2022–23, 2024–25
- Coppa Italia: 2019–20
- Supercoppa Italiana: 2025–26

Slovakia

- King's Cup: 2018

Individual

- Slovak Footballer of the Year: Fan Award: 2022
- Slovak Footballer of the Year: 2023, 2024
- Serie A Team of the Year: 2022–23
