= Lorenzo Sgarbi =

Italian footballer (born 2001)

Personal information
- Date of birth: 24 March 2001 (age 25)
- Place of birth: Bolzano, Italy
- Height: 1.89 m (6 ft 2 in)
- Position: Forward

Team information
- Current team: Sambenedettese (on loan from Napoli)
- Number: 9

Youth career
- 2016–2017: Südtirol
- 2017–2019: → Napoli (loan)
- 2019–2020: Napoli

Senior career*
Years	Team	Apps	(Gls)
2020–	Napoli	0	(0)
2020–2022	→ Legnago Salus (loan)	40	(3)
2022–2023	→ Renate (loan)	10	(1)
2023	→ Pro Sesto (loan)	16	(0)
2023–2024	→ Avellino (loan)	34	(7)
2024–2025	→ Bari (loan)	8	(0)
2025	→ Juve Stabia (loan)	8	(0)
2025–2026	→ Pescara (loan)	14	(1)
2026	→ Avellino (loan)	3	(0)
2026–	→ Sambenedettese (loan)	1	(0)

International career^{‡}
2018–2019	Italy U18	4	(0)
- * Club domestic league appearances and goals as of 23 August 2026 ‡ National team caps and goals as of 8 May 2019

Lorenzo Sgarbi (born 24 March 2001) is an Italian professional footballer who plays as a striker for Serie C Group B club Sambenedettese, on loan from Napoli.

== Club career ==
Born in Bolzano, Sgarbi joined the Napoli youth system in 2017, on loan from Südtirol, and permanently in 2019.

The forward was loaned to Legnago Salus for the 2020–21 Serie C season, and he made his professional debut on 26 September 2020 against Vis Pesaro. This loan was extended one year more.

On 11 July 2022, Sgarbi was loaned to Renate. On 12 January 2023, he moved on a new loan to Pro Sesto. On 17 July, Sgarbi was loaned to Avellino. On 11 July 2024, he moved on loan to Bari. On 8 January 2025, Sgarbi was loaned to Juve Stabia. On 8 August 2025, he moved on loan to Pescara in Serie B. On 2 January 2026, Sgarbi joined Avellino on loan with an option to buy.

== International career ==
Sgarbi was a youth international for Italy U18.
