= Nosa Edward Obaretin =

Italian footballer (born 2003)

Personal information
- Date of birth: 26 January 2003 (age 23)
- Place of birth: Forlì, Italy
- Height: 1.93 m (6 ft 4 in)
- Positions: Centre back; left back

Team information
- Current team: Lorient (on loan from Napoli)
- Number: 55

Youth career
- –2018: Cesena
- 2018–2023: AC Milan
- 2023–2024: Napoli

Senior career*
| Years | Team | Apps | (Gls) |
| 2022– | Napoli | 0 | (0) |
| 2023–2024 | → Trento (loan) | 34 | (2) |
| 2024–2025 | → Bari (loan) | 25 | (0) |
| 2025–2026 | → Empoli (loan) | 29 | (0) |
| 2026– | → Lorient (loan) | 0 | (0) |
- * Club domestic league appearances and goals as of 28 June 2026

Nosa Edward Obaretin (born 26 January 2003) is an Italian professional footballer who plays as a defender for Ligue 1 club Lorient, on loan from Serie A club Napoli.

Primarily deployed as a centre back, he also plays as a left back.

== Club career ==
=== Early years ===
Obaretin started his youth career with Cesena's academy, he later joined to the AC Milan youth academy, with whom he progressed from 2018 until 2023. He renewed his contract with AC Milan in 2021, thanking the club for their trust and support as he had made 19 appearances for the reserves in the previous season. Obaretin then moved to the academy of Napoli in 2023.

==== Loan to Trento ====
His professional start was on a loan with Serie C club Trento during the 2023–24 season.

==== Loan to Bari ====
Obaretin joined Serie B club Bari for the 2024–25 season, where he was primarily utilized in a three-man defense.

==== Loan to Empoli ====
He joined Empoli, on loan for the 2025–26 season in Serie B.

== Personal life ==
Born in Forlì, Italy, Obaretin is of Nigerian descent.
