= 2020 Supercoppa Italiana =

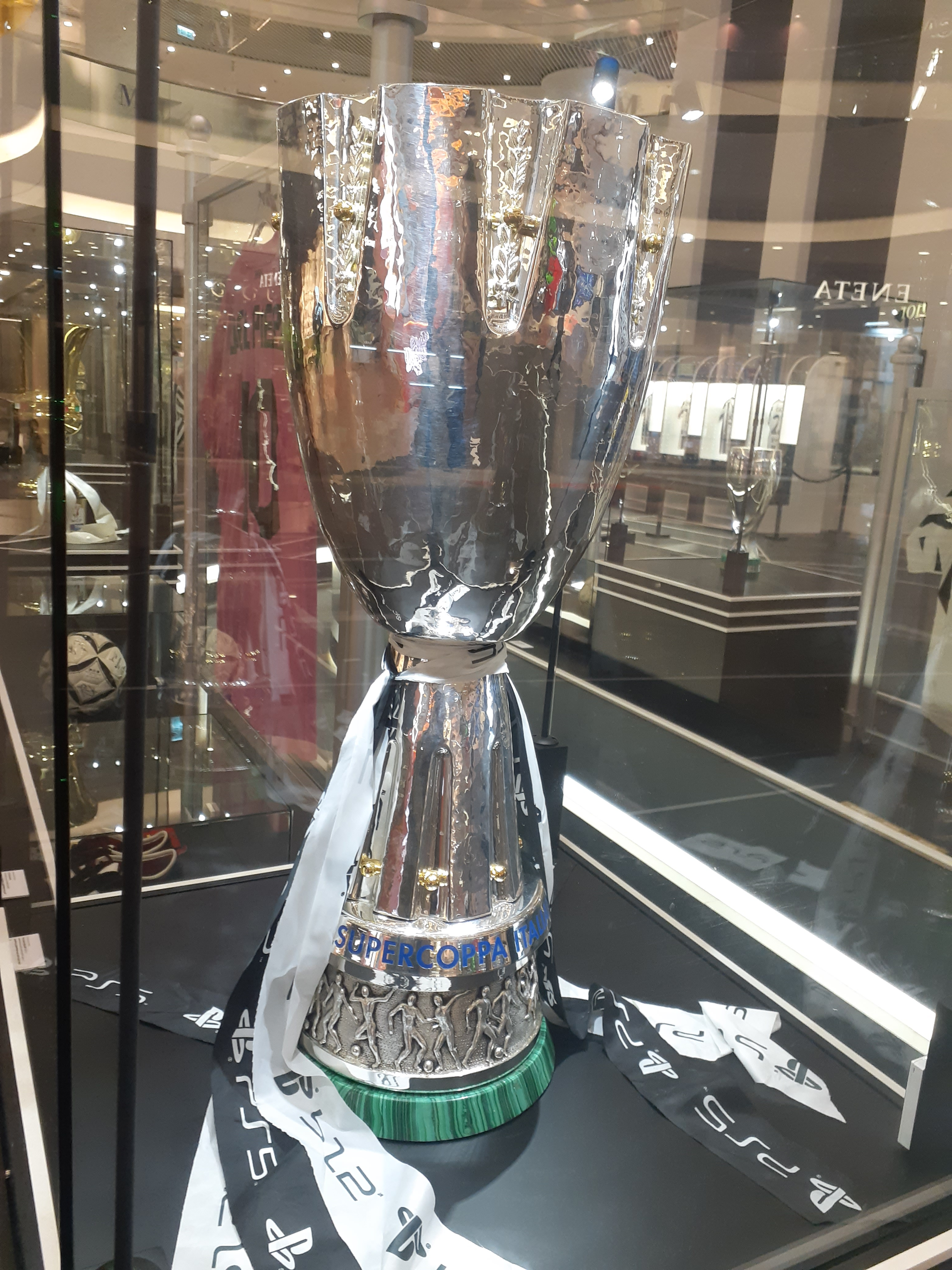
- The Cup displayed in September 2021
- Event: Supercoppa Italiana
Juventus	Napoli
Serie A	Coppa Italia
2	0
- Date: 20 January 2021
- Venue: Mapei Stadium – Città del Tricolore, Reggio Emilia
- Man of the Match: Cristiano Ronaldo (Juventus)
- Referee: Paolo Valeri
- Attendance: 0 (Note: The match was played behind closed doors due to the COVID-19 pandemic in Italy.)

The 2020 Supercoppa Italiana (branded as the PS5 Supercup for sponsorship reasons) was the 33rd edition of the Supercoppa Italiana. It was played on 23 December 2020 for the first time at the Mapei Stadium – Città del Tricolore, Reggio Emilia, between Juventus, the winners of the 2019–20 Serie A championship, and Napoli, the winners of the 2019–20 Coppa Italia. The match was initially supposed to be held in December in Saudi Arabia like the previous year, but restrictions related to the global COVID-19 pandemic forced it to remain in Italy.

Juventus won the match 2–0 and claimed their record-extending ninth Supercoppa Italiana title.

== Background ==
Juventus made its ninth consecutive Supercoppa Italiana appearance, and 16th overall. They had a 4–4 record during this run, and were 8–7 overall. Napoli took part in the competition for the fourth time, having already participated as Serie A champions once (1990) and as Coppa Italia winners twice (2012, 2014). Napoli won two of the previous three editions in which they played. On all three occasions Juventus had been the opponent. The match was a rematch of the 2020 Coppa Italia final, in which Napoli defeated Juventus 4–2 on penalties.

== Match ==
=== Summary ===
Cristiano Ronaldo opened the scoring in the 64th minute when a corner from the left broke to him off the back of Napoli's Tiémoué Bakayoko, he finished to the net from six yards out. Napoli was awarded a penalty kick in the 80th minute, but with a chance to tie the game at 1–1, Lorenzo Insigne missed the net, wide to the left. Álvaro Morata made it 2–0 in the 5th minute of added time with a low shot to the net from the right, after Juan Cuadrado ran into the penalty area and drew goalkeeper David Ospina before passing to him.

=== Details ===
20 January 2021
21:00 CET

Juventus	2–0	Napoli
Ronaldo 64'; Morata 90+5'	Report

Mapei Stadium – Città del Tricolore, Reggio Emilia
Attendance: 0
Referee: Paolo Valeri

Juventus	Napoli

GK	1	(Poland) Wojciech Szczęsny
RB	16	(Colombia) Juan Cuadrado
CB	19	(Italy) Leonardo Bonucci
CB	3	(Italy) Giorgio Chiellini (c)
LB	13	(Brazil) Danilo
RM	14	(United States) Weston McKennie
CM	30	(Uruguay) Rodrigo Bentancur		(substituted off) 83'
CM	5	(Brazil) Arthur
LM	22	(Italy) Federico Chiesa		(substituted off) 46'
CF	44	(Sweden) Dejan Kulusevski		(substituted off) 83'
CF	7	(Portugal) Cristiano Ronaldo	(yellow card) 74'
Substitutes:
GK	31	(Italy) Carlo Pinsoglio
GK	77	(Italy) Gianluigi Buffon
DF	36	(Italy) Alessandro Di Pardo
DF	37	(Romania) Radu Drăgușin
DF	38	(Italy) Gianluca Frabotta
MF	8	(Wales) Aaron Ramsey
MF	25	(France) Adrien Rabiot		(substituted on) 83'
MF	33	(Italy) Federico Bernardeschi		(substituted on) 46'
MF	41	(Italy) Nicolò Fagioli
MF	56	(Italy) Filippo Ranocchia
FW	9	(Spain) Álvaro Morata		(substituted on) 83'
Manager:
(Italy) Andrea Pirlo

GK	25	(Colombia) David Ospina
RB	22	(Italy) Giovanni Di Lorenzo
CB	44	(Greece) Kostas Manolas
CB	26	(Senegal) Kalidou Koulibaly
LB	6	(Portugal) Mário Rui		(substituted off) 84'
CM	4	(Germany) Diego Demme		(substituted off) 84'
CM	5	(France) Tiémoué Bakayoko		(substituted off) 67'
RW	11	(Mexico) Hirving Lozano
AM	20	(Poland) Piotr Zieliński	(yellow card) 89'
LW	24	(Italy) Lorenzo Insigne (c)
CF	37	(Italy) Andrea Petagna		(substituted off) 72'
Substitutes:
GK	1	(Italy) Alex Meret
GK	16	(Italy) Nikita Contini
DF	19	(Serbia) Nikola Maksimović
DF	23	(Albania) Elseid Hysaj
DF	31	(Algeria) Faouzi Ghoulam
DF	33	(Kosovo) Amir Rrahmani
MF	7	(North Macedonia) Eljif Elmas		(substituted on) 67'
MF	68	(Slovakia) Stanislav Lobotka
FW	14	(Belgium) Dries Mertens		(substituted on) 72'
FW	18	(Spain) Fernando Llorente		(substituted on) 84'
FW	21	(Italy) Matteo Politano		(substituted on) 84'
FW	58	(Italy) Antonio Cioffi
Manager:
(Italy) Gennaro Gattuso

Man of the Match:
Cristiano Ronaldo (Juventus)

Assistant referees:
Daniele Bindoni
Stefano Del Giovane
Fourth official:
Maurizio Mariani
Video assistant referee:
Marco Di Bello
Assistant video assistant referee:
Giacomo Paganessi

Match rules

- 90 minutes.
- 30 minutes of extra time if necessary.
- Penalty shoot-out if scores still level.
- Maximum of twelve named substitutes.
- Maximum of five substitutions, with a sixth allowed in extra time. (Note: Each team was given only three opportunities to make substitutions, excluding substitutions made at half-time, before the start of extra time and at half-time in extra time.)

== See also ==
- 2020–21 Serie A
- 2020–21 Coppa Italia
- 2020–21 Juventus FC season
- 2020–21 SSC Napoli season
- Juventus FC–SSC Napoli rivalry
