= 2020–21 SSC Napoli season =

Napoli
2020–21 season
- President: Aurelio De Laurentiis
- Manager: Gennaro Gattuso
- Stadium: Stadio Diego Armando Maradona
- Serie A: 5th
- Coppa Italia: Semi-finals
- UEFA Europa League: Round of 32
- Supercoppa Italiana: Runners-up
- Top goalscorer: League: Lorenzo Insigne (19); All: Lorenzo Insigne (19)
Home colours	Away colours	Third colours

Fourth kit, used in tribute to Diego Maradona

The 2020–21 season was Società Sportiva Calcio Napoli's 75th season in Serie A. Besides the Serie A, the club competed in Italy's main domestic cup competition, the Coppa Italia, as well as the UEFA Europa League and the Supercoppa Italiana as winners of the 2019–20 Coppa Italia.

== Players ==
=== Squad information ===
Last updated on 7 October 2020

No.	Name	Nat.	Position(s)	Date of birth (age)	Signed from	Signed in	Contract ends	Apps.	Goals
Goalkeepers
1	Alex Meret	(Italy)	GK	22 March 1997 (age 29)	(Italy) Udinese	2018	2023	29	0
16	Nikita Contini	(Italy)	GK	21 May 1996 (age 30)	(Italy) Youth Sector	2014	2025	0	0
25	David Ospina	(Colombia)	GK	31 August 1988 (age 38)	(England) Arsenal	2019	2022	25	0
Defenders
6	Mário Rui	(Portugal)	LB	27 May 1991 (age 35)	(Italy) Roma	2017	2025	58	3
19	Nikola Maksimović	(Serbia)	CB	25 November 1991 (age 34)	(Italy) Torino	2016	2021	36	2
22	Giovanni Di Lorenzo	(Italy)	RB	4 August 1993 (age 33)	(Italy) Empoli	2019	2025	22	1
23	Elseid Hysaj	(Albania)	RB	2 February 1994 (age 32)	(Italy) Empoli	2015	2021	145	0
26	Kalidou Koulibaly	(Senegal)	CB	20 June 1991 (age 35)	(Belgium) Genk	2014	2023	173	10
31	Faouzi Ghoulam	(Algeria)	LB	1 February 1991 (age 35)	(France) Saint-Étienne	2014	2022	131	3
33	Amir Rrahmani	(Kosovo)	CB	24 February 1994 (age 32)	(Italy) Hellas Verona	2020	2024	0	0
44	Kostas Manolas	(Greece)	CB	14 June 1991 (age 35)	(Italy) Roma	2019	2024	16	2
Midfielders
4	Diego Demme	(Germany)	DM / RB / CM	21 November 1991 (age 34)	(Germany) RB Leipzig	2020	2024	4	1
5	Tiémoué Bakayoko	(France)	DM / CM	17 August 1994 (age 32)	(England) Chelsea (loan)	2020	2021	0	0
7	Eljif Elmas	(North Macedonia)	CM / AM	24 September 1999 (age 27)	(Turkey) Fenerbahçe	2019	2025	13	1
8	Fabián Ruiz	(Spain)	CM	3 April 1996 (age 30)	(Spain) Real Betis	2018	2023	46	6
20	Piotr Zieliński	(Poland)	CM / RW / LW	20 May 1994 (age 32)	(Italy) Udinese	2016	2024	131	17
68	Stanislav Lobotka	(Slovakia)	DM / CM	25 November 1994 (age 31)	(Spain) Celta Vigo	2020	2024	3	0
Forwards
9	Victor Osimhen	(Nigeria)	CF	29 December 1998 (age 27)	(France) Lille	2020	2025	0	0
11	Hirving Lozano	(Mexico)	LW / RW	30 July 1995 (age 31)	(Netherlands) PSV Eindhoven	2019	2024	16	2
14	Dries Mertens	(Belgium)	CF / ST / LW	6 May 1987 (age 39)	(Netherlands) PSV Eindhoven	2013	2022	223	89
21	Matteo Politano	(Italy)	LW / RW / ST	3 August 1993 (age 33)	(Italy) Internazionale (loan)	2020	2022	2	3
24	Lorenzo Insigne	(Italy)	LW	4 June 1991 (age 35)	(Italy) Youth Sector	2009	2022	256	63
37	Andrea Petagna	(Italy)	ST	30 June 1995 (age 31)	(Italy) SPAL	2020	2024	0	0

== Transfers ==
=== In ===
Date	Pos.	Player	Age	Moving from	Fee	Notes	Source
31 July 2020	FW	(Nigeria) Victor Osimhen	21	(France) Lille	€70M	€10M in add-ons	
8 August 2020	GK	(Italy) Nikita Contini	24	(Italy) Virtus Entella	N/A	Loan return	
8 August 2020	FW	(Algeria) Adam Ounas	23	(France) Nice	N/A	Loan return	
8 August 2020	FW	(Italy) Andrea Petagna	25	(Italy) SPAL	N/A	Loan return	
8 August 2020	DF	(Kosovo) Amir Rrahmani	26	(Italy) Hellas Verona	N/A	Loan return	

==== Loans in ====
Date	Pos.	Player	Age	Moving from	Fee	Notes	Source
5 October 2020	MF	(France) Tiémoué Bakayoko	26	(England) Chelsea	N/A	One year loan	

=== Out ===
Date	Pos.	Player	Age	Moving to	Fee	Notes	Source
9 August 2020	FW	(Spain) José Callejón	33	(Italy) Fiorentina	Free	End of contract	
4 September 2020	GK	(Greece) Orestis Karnezis	35	(France) Lille	Free	Included as part of Osimhen transfer	
5 September 2020	MF	(Brazil) Allan	29	(England) Everton	€25M	Plus bonuses	
27 January 2021	FW	(Spain) Fernando Llorente	35	(Italy) Udinese	Free		

==== Loans out ====
Date	Pos.	Player	Age	Moving to	Fee	Notes	Source
3 October 2020	MF	(Germany) Amin Younes	27	(Germany) Eintracht Frankfurt	N/A	Two year loan with option to buy	
5 October 2020	DF	(Italy) Sebastiano Luperto	24	(Italy) Crotone	N/A	One year loan	
5 October 2020	FW	(Algeria) Adam Ounas	23	(Italy) Cagliari	N/A	One year loan with option to buy	
21 January 2021	FW	(Poland) Arkadiusz Milik	26	(France) Marseille	N/A	18 month loan with obligation to buy	
27 January 2021	DF	(France) Kévin Malcuit	29	(Italy) Fiorentina	N/A	Six month loan with option to buy	
1 February 2021	FW	(Algeria) Adam Ounas	24	(Italy) Crotone	N/A	Six month loan, after Cagliari loan was terminated	

== Pre-season and friendlies ==
Win Draw Loss Fixtures

28 August 2020 Friendly	Castel di Sangro (Italy)	0–10	(Italy) Napoli	Castel di Sangro, Italy
18:30 CEST		Report	Politano 5', 23', 40'; Di Lorenzo 6'; Milik 8', 17'; Koulibaly 16'; Younes 18', 33'; Gaetano 26'	Stadium: Stadio Teofilo Patini
Note: One 45-minute half was played.

28 August 2020 Friendly	Napoli (Italy)	11–0	(Italy) L'Aquila	Castel di Sangro, Italy
19:30 CEST	Osimhen 1', 3', 7'; Mertens 5', 32'; Lozano 17', 28'; Ghoulam 20'; Insigne 22', 30', 45+3'	Report		Stadium: Stadio Teofilo Patini
Note: One 45-minute half was played.

4 September 2020 Friendly	Napoli (Italy)	4–0	(Italy) Teramo	Castel di Sangro, Italy
17:00 CEST	Osimhen 3', 60', 65'; Lozano 13'	Report		Stadium: Stadio Teofilo Patini; Referee: Claudio Petrella

11 September 2020 Friendly	Napoli (Italy)	4–0	(Italy) Pescara	Naples, Italy
18:00 CEST	Zieliński 23'; Ciciretti 71'; Mertens 74'; Petagna 90+2'	Report		Stadium: Stadio San Paolo; Referee: Domenico Mirabella

== Competitions ==
=== Overview ===
Competition	First match	Last match	Starting round	Final position	Record							
Competition	First match	Last match	Starting round	Final position	Pld	W	D	L	GF	GA	GD	Win %
Serie A	20 September 2020	23 May 2021	Matchday 1	5th	38	24	5	9	86	41	+45	63.16
Coppa Italia	13 January 2021	10 February 2021	Round of 16	Semi-finals	4	2	1	1	8	7	+1	50.00
UEFA Europa League	22 October 2020	25 February 2021	Group stage	Round of 32	8	4	2	2	9	7	+2	50.00
Supercoppa Italiana	20 January 2021		Final	Runners-up	1	0	0	1	0	2	−2	0.00
Total					51	30	8	13	103	57	+46	58.82

Source: Soccerway

=== Serie A ===
==== League table ====
Pos	Team	Pld	W	D	L	GF	GA	GD	Pts	Qualification or relegation
3	Atalanta	38	23	9	6	90	47	+43	78 (Note: Atalanta finished ahead of Juventus on head-to-head points: Juventus 1–1 Atalanta, Atalanta 1–0 Juventus.)	Qualification for Champions League group stage
4	Juventus	38	23	9	6	77	38	+39	78	Qualification for Champions League group stage
5	Napoli	38	24	5	9	86	41	+45	77	Qualification for Europa League group stage (Note: Since the winners of the 2020–21 Coppa Italia, Juventus, qualified for the Champions League, the Europa League berth awarded to the Coppa Italia winners was passed to the sixth-placed team, and the Europa Conference League berth awarded to the sixth-placed team was passed to the seventh-placed team.)
6	Lazio	38	21	5	12	61	55	+6	68	Qualification for Europa League group stage
7	Roma	38	18	8	12	68	58	+10	62	Qualification for Conference League play-off round

Source: Serie A, Soccerway
Rules for classification: 1) Points; 2) Head-to-head points; 3) Head-to-head goal difference; 4) Goal difference; 5) Goals scored; 6) Draw. (Note: Head-to-head record is used only after all the matches between the teams in question have been played)

==== Results summary ====
Overall								Home						Away					
Pld	W	D	L	GF	GA	GD	Pts	W	D	L	GF	GA	GD	W	D	L	GF	GA	GD
38	24	5	9	86	41	+45	77	12	4	3	50	20	+30	12	1	6	36	21	+15

Source: Serie A

==== Results by round ====
Round	1	2	3	4	5	6	7	8	9	10	11	12	13	14	15	16	17	18	19	20	21	22	23	24	25	26	27	28	29	30	31	32	33	34	35	36	37	38
Ground	A	H	A	H	A	H	A	H	H	A	H	A	A	H	A	H	A	H	A	H	A	H	A	H	A	H	A	A	H	A	H	H	A	H	A	H	A	H
Result	W	W	L	W	W	L	W	L	W	W	W	L	L	D	W	L	W	W	L	W	L	W	L	W	D	W	W	W	W	W	D	W	W	D	W	W	W	D
Position	5	1	8	4	2	5	3	6	5	3	3	5	3	5	4	6	6	3	6	5	6	5	7	6	6	6	5	5	5	5	5	5	3	5	4	4	4	5

Source: Serie A
A = Away; H = Home; W = Win; D = Draw; L = Loss

==== Matches ====
The league fixtures were announced on 2 September 2020.

20 September 2020 1	Parma	0–2	Napoli	Parma
12:30 CEST (UTC+2)	Darmian (yellow card) 36'; Alves (yellow card) 59'; Pezzella (yellow card) 73'; Kucka (yellow card) 75'	Report	Demme (yellow card) 35'; Mertens 63'; Insigne 77'	Stadium: Stadio Ennio Tardini; Referee: Maurizio Mariani

27 September 2020 2	Napoli	6–0	Genoa	Naples
15:00 CEST (UTC+2)	Lozano 42', 65'; Zieliński 46'; Mertens 57'; Elmas 69'; Politano 72'; Osimhen (yellow card) 90+1'	Report	Destro (yellow card) 90'; Masiello (yellow card) 90+1'	Stadium: Stadio San Paolo; Referee: Juan Luca Sacchi

17 October 2020 4	Napoli	4–1	Atalanta	Naples
15:00 CEST (UTC+2)	Lozano 23', 27', (yellow card) 79'; Politano 30'; Osimhen 43'	Report	Toloi (yellow card) 38'; Gosens (yellow card) 45+1'; Lammers 69'; Djimsiti (yellow card) 81'	Stadium: Stadio San Paolo; Referee: Marco Di Bello

25 October 2020 5	Benevento	1–2	Napoli	Benevento
15:00 CET (UTC+1)	R. Insigne 30'; Caprari (yellow card) 45+1'; Foulon (yellow card) 57'; Glik (yellow card) 85'	Report	L. Insigne 60'; Petagna 67'; Politano (yellow card) 90+7'	Stadium: Stadio Ciro Vigorito; Referee: Daniele Doveri

1 November 2020 6	Napoli	0–2	Sassuolo	Naples
18:00 CET (UTC+1)	Manolas (yellow card) 61'; Ospina (yellow card) 90+6'	Report	Locatelli (yellow card) 49', (goal) 59' (pen.); Bourabia (yellow card) 90'; Lopez 90+5'	Stadium: Stadio San Paolo; Attendance: 0 Referee: Maurizio Mariani

8 November 2020 7	Bologna	0–1	Napoli	Bologna
18:00 CET (UTC+1)	Domínguez (yellow card) 25'; Danilo (yellow card) 27'; Schouten (yellow card) 62'	Report	Osimhen 23'	Stadium: Stadio Renato Dall'Ara; Attendance: 0 Referee: Fabrizio Pasqua

22 November 2020 8	Napoli	1–3	Milan	Naples
20:45 CET (UTC+1)	Bakayoko (yellow card) 16' (yellow-red card) 65'; Mertens 63'; Mário Rui (yellow card) 82'	Report	Ibrahimović 20', 54'; Calabria (yellow card) 47'; Rebić (yellow card) 59'; Kessié (yellow card) 76'; Castillejo (yellow card) 85'; Hauge 90+5'	Stadium: Stadio San Paolo; Attendance: 0 Referee: Paolo Valeri

29 November 2020 9	Napoli	4–0	Roma	Naples
20:45 CET (UTC+1)	Insigne 31'; Di Lorenzo (yellow card) 32'; Fabián 65'; Mertens 81'; Politano 87'	Report	Ibañez (yellow card) 29'; Cristante (yellow card) 77'	Stadium: Stadio San Paolo; Attendance: 0 Referee: Marco Di Bello

6 December 2020 10	Crotone	0–4	Napoli	Crotone
18:00 CET (UTC+1)	Cuomo (yellow card) 45'; Petriccione (red card) 50'; Pereira (yellow card) 53'; Reca (yellow card) 67'	Report	Koulibaly (yellow card) 6'; Insigne 31'; Lozano 58'; Demme 76'; Lobotka (yellow card) 81'; Politano (yellow card) 84'; Petagna 90+1'	Stadium: Stadio Ezio Scida; Attendance: 0 Referee: Livio Marinelli

13 December 2020 11	Napoli	2–1	Sampdoria	Naples
15:00 CET (UTC+1)	Lozano 53'; Petagna 68'; Di Lorenzo (yellow card) 84'; Insigne (yellow card) 90+2'; Mário Rui (yellow card) 90+5'	Report	Jankto 20'; Thorsby (yellow card) 38'; Ekdal (yellow card) 52'; Colley (yellow card) 83'; Ramírez (yellow card) 90+2'	Stadium: Stadio San Paolo; Attendance: 0 Referee: Federico La Penna

16 December 2020 12	Internazionale	1–0	Napoli	Milan
20:45 CET (UTC+1)	Brozović (yellow card) 57'; Lukaku 71' (pen.), (yellow card) 80'; Škriniar (yellow card) 85'; D'Ambrosio (yellow card) 88'; Handanović (yellow card) 90+1'	Report	Bakayoko (yellow card) 59'; Ospina (yellow card) 71'; Insigne (red card) 72'; Lozano (yellow card) 74'	Stadium: San Siro; Attendance: 0 Referee: Davide Massa

20 December 2020 13	Lazio	2–0	Napoli	Rome
20:45 CET (UTC+1)	Immobile 9', (yellow card) 43'; Hoedt (yellow card) 11'; Escalante (yellow card) 24'; Luis Alberto 56'; Lazzari (yellow card) 90+1'	Report	Lozano (yellow card) 13'; Koulibaly (yellow card) 30'; Lobotka (yellow card) 75'	Stadium: Stadio Olimpico; Attendance: 0 Referee: Daniele Orsato

23 December 2020 14	Napoli	1–1	Torino	Naples
20:45 CET (UTC+1)	Bakayoko (yellow card) 63'; Elmas (yellow card) 87'; Insigne 90+2'; Di Lorenzo (yellow card) 90+6'	Report	Izzo (yellow card) 33', (goal) 56'; Buongiorno (yellow card) 40'; Linetty (yellow card) 76'	Stadium: Stadio San Paolo; Attendance: 0 Referee: Paolo Valeri

3 January 2021 15	Cagliari	1–4	Napoli	Cagliari
15:00 CET (UTC+1)	Lykogiannis (yellow card) 30' (yellow-red card) 65'; Sottil (yellow card) 53'; João Pedro 60'; Caligara (yellow card) 85'	Report	Zieliński 25', 62', (yellow card) 72'; Lozano 74'; Insigne 86' (pen.)	Stadium: Sardegna Arena; Attendance: 0 Referee: Gianluca Manganiello

6 January 2021 16	Napoli	1–2	Spezia	Naples
18:00 CET (UTC+1)	Petagna 58'; Di Lorenzo (yellow card) 87'; Manolas (yellow card) 90+3'	Report	Ismajli (yellow card) 61' (yellow-red card) 77'; Pobega (yellow card) 65', (goal) 82'; Nzola 68' (pen.); Maggiore (yellow card) 72'; Terzi (yellow card) 88'	Stadium: Stadio San Paolo; Attendance: 0 Referee: Maurizio Mariani

10 January 2021 17	Udinese	1–2	Napoli	Udine
15:00 CET (UTC+1)	Lasagna 27'; Arslan (yellow card) 44'; Samir (yellow card) 67'; Zeegelaar (yellow card) 86'	Report	Insigne 15' (pen.); Di Lorenzo (yellow card) 37'; Bakayoko 90'	Stadium: Stadio Friuli; Attendance: 0 Referee: Fabrizio Pasqua

17 January 2021 18	Napoli	6–0	Fiorentina	Naples
12:30 CET (UTC+1)	Insigne 5', 72' (pen.), (yellow card) 51'; Demme 36'; Lozano 38'; Zieliński 45'; Politano 89'	Report		Stadium: Stadio San Paolo; Attendance: 0 Referee: Daniele Chiffi

24 January 2021 19	Hellas Verona	3–1	Napoli	Verona
15:00 CET (UTC+1)	Dimarco 34'; Magnani (yellow card) 60'; Barák 62'; Zaccagni 79', (yellow card) 80'	Report	Lozano 1'; Demme (yellow card) 16'; Di Lorenzo (yellow card) 54'; Koulibaly (yellow card) 71'	Stadium: Stadio Marcantonio Bentegodi; Attendance: 0 Referee: Michael Fabbri

31 January 2021 20	Napoli	2–0	Parma	Naples
18:00 CET (UTC+1)	Elmas 32', (yellow card) 75'; Demme (yellow card) 71'; Politano 82'	Report	Gagliolo (yellow card) 5'; Pezzella (yellow card) 31'; Conti (yellow card) 71'; Brugman (yellow card) 76'	Stadium: Stadio San Paolo; Attendance: 0 Referee: Federico La Penna

6 February 2021 21	Genoa	2–1	Napoli	Genoa
20:45 CET (UTC+1)	Pandev 11', 26'; Badelj (yellow card) 29'; Czyborra (yellow card) 57'	Report	Lozano (yellow card) 74'; Politano 79'; Mário Rui (yellow card) 90+4'	Stadium: Stadio Luigi Ferraris; Attendance: 0 Referee: Gianluca Manganiello

13 February 2021 22	Napoli	1–0	Juventus	Naples
18:00 CET (UTC+1)	Di Lorenzo (yellow card) 23'; Insigne 31' (pen.); Bakayoko (yellow card) 56'	Report	Chiellini (yellow card) 30'; Cuadrado (yellow card) 45'; Rabiot (yellow card) 90+3'	Stadium: Stadio San Paolo; Attendance: 0 Referee: Daniele Doveri

21 February 2021 23	Atalanta	4–2	Napoli	Bergamo
18:00 CET (UTC+1)	Zapata 52'; Djimsiti (yellow card) 55'; Gosens 64', (yellow card) 87'; Muriel 71'; Romero 79'	Report	Di Lorenzo (yellow card) 6'; Zieliński 58'; Gosens 76' (o.g.)	Stadium: Gewiss Stadium; Attendance: 0 Referee: Marco Di Bello

28 February 2021 24	Napoli	2–0	Benevento	Naples
18:00 CET (UTC+1)	Mertens 34'; Koulibaly (yellow card) 58' (yellow-red card) 81'; Di Lorenzo (yellow card) 61'; Politano 66'	Report	Barba (yellow card) 80'; Hetemaj (yellow card) 84'	Stadium: Stadio San Paolo; Attendance: 0 Referee: Rosario Abisso

3 March 2021 25	Sassuolo	3–3	Napoli	Reggio Emilia
18:30 CET (UTC+1)	Đuričić (yellow card) 30'; Maksimović 36' (o.g.); Berardi 45+1' (pen.); Marlon (yellow card) 79'; Caputo 90+5' (pen.)	Report	Zieliński 38'; Demme (yellow card) 69'; Di Lorenzo 72'; Ghoulam (yellow card) 77'; Insigne 90' (pen.)	Stadium: Mapei Stadium; Attendance: 0 Referee: Valerio Marini

7 March 2021 26	Napoli	3–1	Bologna	Naples
20:45 CET (UTC+1)	Insigne 8', 76'; Koulibaly (yellow card) 52'; Osimhen 65'; Mário Rui (yellow card) 85'	Report	Soriano 73'	Stadium: Stadio San Paolo; Attendance: 0 Referee: Daniele Chiffi

14 March 2021 27	Milan	0–1	Napoli	Milan
20:45 CET (UTC+1)	Hernandez (yellow card) 86'; Rebić (red card) 90+2'	Report	Maksimović (yellow card) 26'; Politano 49'; Di Lorenzo (yellow card) 70'	Stadium: San Siro; Attendance: 0 Referee: Fabrizio Pasqua

21 March 2021 28	Roma	0–2	Napoli	Rome
20:45 CET (UTC+1)	Ibañez (yellow card) 26'; Mancini (yellow card) 45+1'; Diawara (yellow card) 59'; El Shaarawy (yellow card) 64'; Villar (yellow card) 85'	Report	Mertens 27', 34'; Zieliński (yellow card) 47'; Koulibaly (yellow card) 78'; Osimhen (yellow card) 90+1'	Stadium: Stadio Olimpico; Attendance: 0 Referee: Marco Di Bello

3 April 2021 29	Napoli	4–3	Crotone	Naples
15:00 CEST (UTC+2)	Insigne 19'; Osimhen 22'; Mertens 34'; Di Lorenzo 72'	Report	Rispoli (yellow card) 19'; Simy 25', 48'; Messias 59'; Benali (yellow card) 67'; Pereira (yellow card) 78'; Rojas (yellow card) 87'	Stadium: Stadio San Paolo; Attendance: 0 Referee: Antonio Di Martino

7 April 2021 3	Juventus	2–1	Napoli	Turin
18:45 CEST (UTC+2)	Ronaldo 13'; Alex Sandro (yellow card) 54'; Dybala 73'	Report	Koulibaly (yellow card) 22'; Rrahmani (yellow card) 81'; Insigne 90' (pen.)	Stadium: Allianz Stadium; Attendance: 0 Referee: Maurizio Mariani
Note: The match was initially scheduled to take place on 4 October 2020, but Napoli abandoned the match sub judice after they did not travel due to the COVID-19 pandemic. On 14 October 2020, Juventus were awarded a 3–0 victory by default and Napoli docked one point as the Disciplinary Commission ruled Napoli did not follow the COVID-19 protocol. However, Napoli appealed the result to the Italian National Olympic Committee, and the verdict was overturned on 22 December 2020, to be replayed. On 3 March 2021, it was announced that the match was to be replayed on 17 March 2021. On 12 March 2021, the match was moved to 7 April 2021.

11 April 2021 30	Sampdoria	0–2	Napoli	Genoa
15:00 CEST (UTC+2)		Report	Manolas (yellow card) 24'; Fabián 35'; Koulibaly (yellow card) 46'; Lozano (yellow card) 78'; Osimhen 87'	Stadium: Stadio Luigi Ferraris; Attendance: 0 Referee: Paolo Valeri

18 April 2021 31	Napoli	1–1	Internazionale	Naples
20:45 CEST (UTC+2)	Handanović 36' (o.g.); Koulibaly (yellow card) 38'; Demme (yellow card) 80'; Politano (yellow card) 87'; Mertens (yellow card) 88'; Manolas (yellow card) 90+4'	Report	Eriksen 55'; Darmian (yellow card) 63'; Hakimi (yellow card) 90+5'	Stadium: Stadio San Paolo; Attendance: 0 Referee: Daniele Doveri

22 April 2021 32	Napoli	5–2	Lazio	Naples
20:45 CEST (UTC+2)	Insigne 7' (pen.), 53'; Politano 12'; Manolas (yellow card) 15'; Fabián (yellow card) 42'; Mertens (yellow card) 45+1', (goal) 65'; Di Lorenzo (yellow card) 73'; Osimhen 80'	Report	Milinković-Savić (yellow card) 6', (goal) 74'; Lucas (yellow card) 30'; Immobile (yellow card) 48', (goal) 70'; Pereira (yellow card) 75'	Stadium: Stadio San Paolo; Attendance: 0 Referee: Marco Di Bello

26 April 2021 33	Torino	0–2	Napoli	Turin
18:30 CEST (UTC+2)	Verdi (yellow card) 45+1'; Mandragora (yellow card) 58' (yellow-red card) 86'	Report	Bakayoko 11'; Osimhen 13', (yellow card) 68'	Stadium: Stadio Olimpico Grande Torino; Attendance: 0 Referee: Paolo Valeri

2 May 2021 34	Napoli	1–1	Cagliari	Naples
15:00 CEST (UTC+2)	Osimhen 13'; Demme (yellow card) 56'	Report	Godín (yellow card) 32'; Deiola (yellow card) 34'; Pavoletti (yellow card) 46'; Nández 90+4'	Stadium: Stadio San Paolo; Attendance: 0 Referee: Michael Fabbri

8 May 2021 35	Spezia	1–4	Napoli	La Spezia
15:00 CEST (UTC+2)	Ricci (yellow card) 34'; Estévez (yellow card) 58'; Vignali (yellow card) 62'; Piccoli 64'	Report	Hysaj (yellow card) 6'; Zieliński 15'; Osimhen 23', 44', (yellow card) 65'; Lozano 79'	Stadium: Stadio Alberto Picco; Attendance: 0 Referee: Massimiliano Irrati

11 May 2021 36	Napoli	5–1	Udinese	Naples
20:45 CEST (UTC+2)	Zieliński 28'; Fabián 31'; Lozano 56'; Di Lorenzo 66'; Insigne 90+1'	Report	Okaka 41'; Bonifazi (yellow card) 54'	Stadium: Stadio San Paolo; Attendance: 0 Referee: Gianpaolo Calvarese

16 May 2021 37	Fiorentina	0–2	Napoli	Florence
12:30 CEST (UTC+2)	Milenković (yellow card) 31'; Ribéry (yellow card) 43'; Cáceres (yellow card) 49'; Drągowski (red card) 56'; Castrovilli (yellow card) 61'; Pezzella (yellow card) 80'	Report	Rrahmani (yellow card) 22'; Insigne (penalty missed) 56', 56'; Venuti 67' (o.g.); Contini (yellow card) 68'	Stadium: Stadio Artemio Franchi; Attendance: 0 Referee: Rosario Abisso
Note: Drągowski was sent off for dissent while a substitute.

23 May 2021 38	Napoli	1–1	Hellas Verona	Naples
20:45 CEST (UTC+2)	Lozano (yellow card) 20'; Rrahmani 60'; Bakayoko (yellow card) 71'; Hysaj (yellow card) 88'	Report	Ilić (yellow card) 32'; Dawidowicz (yellow card) 38'; Udogie (yellow card) 54'; Dimarco (yellow card) 56'; Faraoni 69'	Stadium: Stadio San Paolo; Attendance: 0 Referee: Daniele Chiffi

=== Coppa Italia ===
13 January 2021 Round of 16	Napoli	3–2	Empoli	Naples
17:45 CET (UTC+1)	Di Lorenzo 18'; Lozano 38'; Petagna 77'	Report	Bajrami 33', 68'; Olivieri (yellow card) 45+1'	Stadium: Stadio San Paolo; Referee: Antonio Giua

28 January 2021 Quarter-finals	Napoli	4–2	Spezia	Naples
21:00 CET (UTC+1)	Koulibaly 5'; Lozano (yellow card) 10', (goal) 20'; Politano 30'; Elmas 40'; Mário Rui (yellow card) 61'	Report	Gyasi 71'; Acampora 73'	Stadium: Stadio San Paolo; Referee: Francesco Fourneau

3 February 2021 Semi-finals; First leg	Napoli	0–0	Atalanta	Naples
20:45 CET (UTC+1)	Koulibaly (yellow card) 88'	Report	Romero (yellow card) 64'	Stadium: Stadio San Paolo; Referee: Michael Fabbri

10 February 2021 Semi-finals; Second leg	Atalanta	3–1 (3–1 agg.)	Napoli	Bergamo
20:45 CET (UTC+1)	Palomino (yellow card) 7'; Zapata 10'; Pessina 16', 78'	Report	Hysaj (yellow card) 25'; Lozano 53'; Zieliński (yellow card) 57'; Di Lorenzo (yellow card) 75'; Insigne (yellow card) 90+2'	Stadium: Gewiss Stadium; Referee: Federico La Penna

=== Supercoppa Italiana ===
==== Background ====
The 2020 Supercoppa Italiana was the fourth time Napoli took part in the competition, having already participated as Serie A champions once (1990) and as Coppa Italia winners twice (2012 and 2014). Napoli won two of the previous three editions in which they played.

20 January 2021 Final	Juventus	2–0	Napoli	Reggio Emilia
21:00 CET (UTC+1)	Ronaldo 64', (yellow card) 74'; Morata 90+6'	Report	Insigne (penalty missed) 80'; Zieliński (yellow card) 89'	Stadium: Mapei Stadium – Città del Tricolore; Attendance: 0 Referee: Paolo Valeri

=== UEFA Europa League ===
==== Group stage ====
The group stage draw was held on 2 October 2020.

Pos	Team	Pld	W	D	L	GF	GA	GD	Pts	Qualification	NAP	RSO	AZ	RJK
1	(Italy) Napoli	6	3	2	1	7	4	+3	11	Advance to knockout phase	—	1–1	0–1	2–0
2	(Spain) Real Sociedad	6	2	3	1	5	4	+1	9	Advance to knockout phase	0–1	—	1–0	2–2
3	(Netherlands) AZ	6	2	2	2	7	5	+2	8		1–1	0–0	—	4–1
4	(Croatia) Rijeka	6	1	1	4	6	12	−6	4		1–2	0–1	2–1	—

Source: UEFA
Rules for classification: Group stage tiebreakers

22 October 2020 1	Napoli (Italy)	0–1	(Netherlands) AZ	Naples, Italy
18:55 CEST (UTC+2)	Koulibaly (yellow card) 90'	Report	De Wit 57', (yellow card) 81'	Stadium: Stadio San Paolo; Attendance: 494; Referee: Daniel Stefański (Poland)

29 October 2020 2	Real Sociedad (Spain)	0–1	(Italy) Napoli	San Sebastián, Spain
21:00 CET (UTC+1)	Le Normand (yellow card) 72'	Report	Lozano (yellow card) 45'; Politano 56'; Osimhen (yellow card) 81' (yellow-red card) 90+2'	Stadium: Anoeta; Attendance: 0 (Note: Due to the COVID-19 pandemic in Europe, the match was played behind closed doors.); Referee: Craig Pawson (England)

5 November 2020 3	Rijeka (Croatia)	1–2	(Italy) Napoli	Rijeka, Croatia
18:55 CET (UTC+1)	Murić 13'; Smolčić (yellow card) 30'; Braut (yellow card) 44'	Report	Politano (yellow card) 22'; Demme 43'; Koulibaly (yellow card) 45+2'; Braut 62' (o.g.)	Stadium: Stadion Rujevica; Attendance: 0 Referee: Mattias Gestranius (Finland)

26 November 2020 4	Napoli (Italy)	2–0	(Croatia) Rijeka	Naples, Italy
21:00 CET (UTC+1)	Anastasio 41' (o.g.); Lozano 75'	Report	Anastasio (yellow card) 74'	Stadium: Stadio San Paolo; Attendance: 0 Referee: Halis Özkahya (Turkey)

3 December 2020 5	AZ (Netherlands)	1–1	(Italy) Napoli	Alkmaar, Netherlands
21:00 CET (UTC+1)	Martins Indi (yellow card) 41', (goal) 54'; Wijndal (yellow card) 56'; Koopmeiners (penalty missed) 60'	Report	Mertens 6'; Demme (yellow card) 90+2'	Stadium: AZ Stadion; Attendance: 0 Referee: Ruddy Buquet (France)

10 December 2020 6	Napoli (Italy)	1–1	(Spain) Real Sociedad	Naples, Italy
18:55 CET (UTC+1)	Mertens (yellow card) 25'; Zieliński 35'; Lozano (yellow card) 41'; Fabián (yellow card) 59'	Report	Zubimendi (yellow card) 39'; Le Normand (yellow card) 68'; Zubeldia (yellow card) 82'; Willian José 90+2'	Stadium: Stadio San Paolo; Attendance: 0 Referee: Orel Grinfeld (Israel)

==== Knockout phase ====
===== Round of 32 =====
The draw for the round of 32 was held on 14 December 2020.

18 February 2021 First leg	Granada (Spain)	2–0	(Italy) Napoli	Granada, Spain
21:00 CET (UTC+1)	Herrera 19'; Kenedy 21'; Foulquier (yellow card) 38'; Silva (yellow card) 77'; Díaz (yellow card) 86'; Eteki (yellow card) 90+2'; Montoro (yellow card) 90+2'	Report	Elmas (yellow card) 26'; Di Lorenzo (yellow card) 27'; Insigne (yellow card) 79'; Zieliński (yellow card) 83'; Mário Rui (yellow card) 90+1'	Stadium: Nuevo Los Cármenes; Attendance: 0 Referee: Sergei Karasev (Russia)

25 February 2021 Second leg	Napoli (Italy)	2–1 (2–3 agg.)	(Spain) Granada	Naples, Italy
18:55 CET (UTC+1)	Zieliński 2'; Politano (yellow card) 37'; Maksimović (yellow card) 41'; Insigne (yellow card) 42'; Fabián 59'; Bakayoko (yellow card) 88'; Koulibaly (yellow card) 90'	Report	Montoro 25', (yellow card) 39'; Kenedy (yellow card) 37'; Duarte (yellow card) 40'; Germán (yellow card) 55'; Herrera (yellow card) 62'; Foulquier (yellow card) 90'	Stadium: Stadio San Paolo; Attendance: 0 Referee: Daniel Siebert (Germany)

== Statistics ==
=== Appearances and goals ===
No.	Pos	Nat	Player	Total		Serie A		Supercoppa Italiana		Coppa Italia		Europa League	
No.	Pos	Nat	Player	Apps	Goals	Apps	Goals	Apps	Goals	Apps	Goals	Apps	Goals
Goalkeepers
1	GK	(Italy) ITA	Alex Meret	28	0	22	0	0	0	1	0	5	0
16	GK	(Italy) ITA	Nikita Contini	0	0	0	0	0	0	0	0	0	0
25	GK	(Colombia) COL	David Ospina	23	0	16	0	1	0	3	0	3	0
Defenders
6	DF	(Portugal) POR	Mário Rui	36	0	17+10	0	1	0	1+1	0	4+2	0
19	DF	(Serbia) SRB	Nikola Maksimović	27	0	12+5	0	0	0	2	0	8	0
22	DF	(Italy) ITA	Giovanni Di Lorenzo	49	4	36	3	1	0	3+1	1	7+1	0
23	DF	(Albania) ALB	Elseid Hysaj	29	0	20+4	0	0	0	3	0	2	0
26	DF	(Senegal) SEN	Kalidou Koulibaly	37	1	25+1	0	1	0	3	1	7	0
31	DF	(Algeria) ALG	Faouzi Ghoulam	17	0	3+8	0	0	0	1	0	2+3	0
33	DF	(Kosovo) KOS	Amir Rrahmani	20	1	12+4	1	0	0	2	0	2	0
44	DF	(Greece) GRE	Kostas Manolas	33	0	27+3	0	1	0	2	0	0	0
Midfielders
4	MF	(Germany) GER	Diego Demme	35	3	20+4	2	1	0	3+1	0	3+3	1
5	MF	(France) FRA	Tiémoué Bakayoko	44	2	23+9	2	1	0	2+2	0	5+2	0
7	MF	(North Macedonia) MKD	Eljif Elmas	44	3	3+30	2	0+1	0	3+1	1	4+2	0
8	MF	(Spain) ESP	Fabián Ruiz	42	4	29+4	3	0	0	0+1	0	5+3	1
20	MF	(Poland) POL	Piotr Zieliński	47	10	32+4	8	1	0	2+2	0	4+2	2
68	MF	(Slovakia) SVK	Stanislav Lobotka	23	0	0+15	0	0	0	1+2	0	4+1	0
Forwards
9	FW	(Nigeria) NGR	Victor Osimhen	30	10	16+8	10	0	0	1+2	0	2+1	0
11	FW	(Mexico) MEX	Hirving Lozano	43	15	23+9	11	1	0	4	3	2+4	1
14	FW	(Belgium) BEL	Dries Mertens	38	10	18+11	9	0+1	0	0+1	0	4+3	1
21	FW	(Italy) ITA	Matteo Politano	50	11	22+15	9	0+1	0	3+1	1	7+1	1
24	FW	(Italy) ITA	Lorenzo Insigne	48	19	33+2	19	1	0	3+1	0	5+3	0
37	FW	(Italy) ITA	Andrea Petagna	36	5	9+17	4	1	0	1+2	1	3+3	0
58	FW	(Italy) ITA	Antonio Cioffi	1	0	0+1	0	0	0	0	0	0	0
Players transferred out during the season
2	DF	(France) FRA	Kévin Malcuit	2	0	0+2	0	0	0	0	0	0	0
13	DF	(Italy) ITA	Sebastiano Luperto	0	0	0	0	0	0	0	0	0	0
34	MF	(Germany) GER	Amin Younes	0	0	0	0	0	0	0	0	0	0
18	FW	(Spain) ESP	Fernando Llorente	5	0	0+3	0	0+1	0	0+1	0	0	0
99	FW	(Poland) POL	Arkadiusz Milik	0	0	0	0	0	0	0	0	0	0

Source: Competitions

=== Goalscorers ===
Rank	No.	Pos.	Nat	Name	Serie A	Coppa Italia	Europa League	Supercoppa Italiana	Total
1	24	FW	(Italy)	Lorenzo Insigne	19	0	0	0	19
2	11	FW	(Mexico)	Hirving Lozano	11	3	1	0	15
3	21	FW	(Italy)	Matteo Politano	9	1	1	0	11
4	9	FW	(Nigeria)	Victor Osimhen	10	0	0	0	10
4	14	FW	(Belgium)	Dries Mertens	9	0	1	0	10
4	20	MF	(Poland)	Piotr Zieliński	8	0	2	0	10
7	37	FW	(Italy)	Andrea Petagna	4	1	0	0	5
8	8	MF	(Spain)	Fabián Ruiz	3	0	1	0	4
8	22	DF	(Italy)	Giovanni Di Lorenzo	3	1	0	0	4
10	4	MF	(Germany)	Diego Demme	2	0	1	0	3
10	7	MF	(North Macedonia)	Eljif Elmas	2	1	0	0	3
12	5	MF	(France)	Tiémoué Bakayoko	2	0	0	0	2
13	26	DF	(Senegal)	Kalidou Koulibaly	0	1	0	0	1
13	33	DF	(Kosovo)	Amir Rrahmani	1	0	0	0	1
Own goals					3	0	2	0	5
Totals					86	8	9	0	103
