= Juventus FC–SSC Napoli rivalry =

Italian professional football rivalry

- Juventus Napoli
- First meeting: 21 December 1926; Divisione Nazionale; Napoli 0–3 Juventus
- Latest meeting: 1 November 2026; Serie A Juventus 2–0 Napoli
- Next meeting: 13 February 2027; Serie A Napoli v Juventus
- Stadiums: Allianz Stadium (Juventus); Stadio Diego Armando Maradona (Napoli)

Statistics
- Total meetings: Official matches: 187; Unofficial matches: 7 Total matches: 194
- Most wins: Official matches: Juventus (86); Unofficial matches: Juventus (3); Total matches: Juventus (89)
- Largest victory: Juventus 8–0 Napoli; Divisione Nazionale (6 March 1927)

Juventus	Napoli

The Juventus–Napoli rivalry is an inter-city football rivalry contested between Turin-based Juventus and Naples-based Napoli.

== History ==
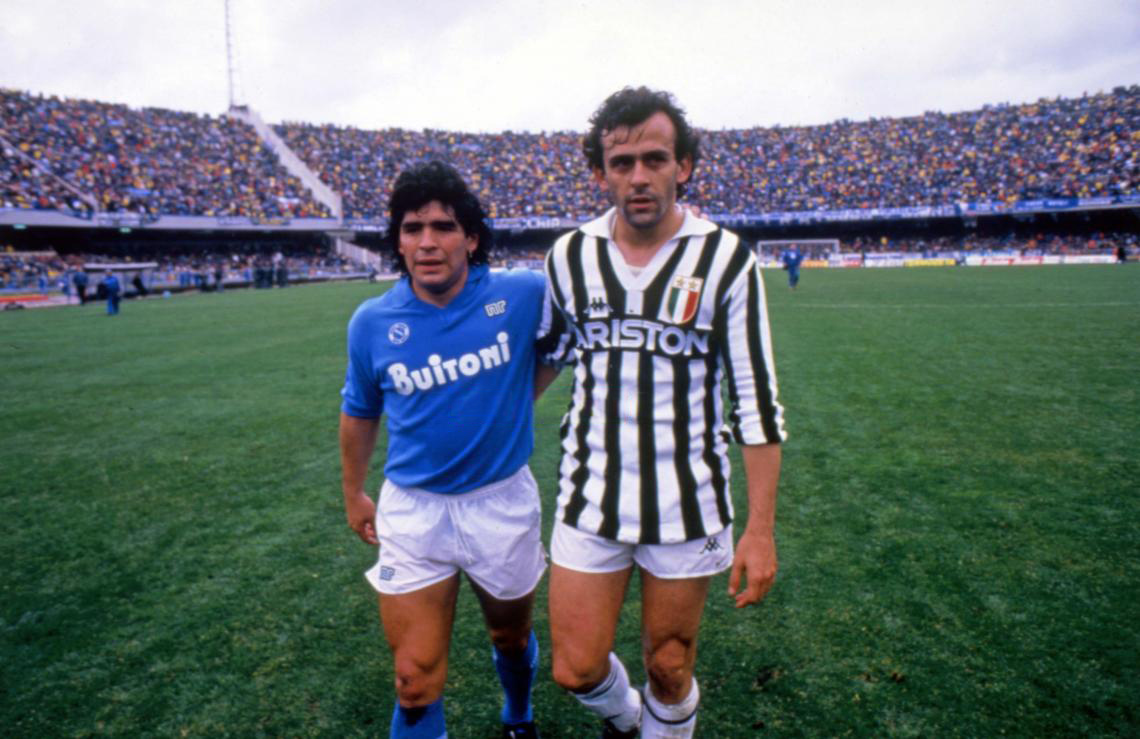
From left to right: Napoli's Diego Armando Maradona and Juventus' Michel Platini in the Serie A game of March 29, 1987

The rivalry between Juventus and Napoli stems from a historical regional rivalry between Northern Italy and Southern Italy, of which the clubs' respective home cities of Turin and Naples are major metropolitan and economic centers. The rivalry started to gain more attention in the 1980s when Napoli became league contenders.

Juventus won the 1985–86 Serie A title with star player Michel Platini, six points clear of third placed Napoli. In the 1986–87 Serie A, Napoli won their first scudetto with star player Diego Maradona, three points ahead of second placed Juventus, the first and only Southern Italian team to win the league. Napoli won another, and final title in the 1989–90 Serie A. After that time, Juventus shared success with Milan in regards to scudetti as Napoli started to decline in the 1990s. In the 1997–98 Serie A, Napoli were relegated to Serie B after winning only two matches. By August 2004, Napoli was declared bankrupt. Film producer Aurelio De Laurentiis refounded Napoli under the name Napoli Soccer, and were placed in the 2004–05 Serie C1. In the 2005–06 Serie C1, they secured promotion to Serie B and De Laurentiis bought back the name Società Sportiva Calcio Napoli in May 2006.

After one season back in the 2006–07 Serie B, Napoli were promoted to Serie A, along with that season's Serie B champions, Juventus, after the bianconeri had been controversially relegated at the end of the 2005–06 Serie A and had their two most recent league titles stripped because of involvement in the Calciopoli scandal. On the pitch, the rivalry intensified in the 2010s with Napoli's 2–0 win over Juventus in the 2012 Coppa Italia final, Juventus captain Alessandro Del Piero's last game for Juventus. Between the 2011–12 Serie A and the 2016–17 Serie A league seasons, Juventus won each title, with Napoli finishing in at least the top five in each of the seasons. The summer before the 2016–17 season, Argentine forward Gonzalo Higuaín became the third highest football transfer of all-time and highest ever transfer for an Italian club, when he was signed by Juventus for €90 million from Napoli. Higuaín jerseys were burned in the streets of Naples.

Since Higuaín joined Juventus in 2016, Napoli fans were not allowed to travel to Turin for Juventus match-ups and vice versa. That season, Juventus paid many fines and had a partial stadium ban because of the repeated chant "Vesuvius wash them with lava". On 22 April 2018, Napoli fans were allowed to travel to Turin but not those from the Campania region of Italy, where Naples is located. Napoli won the match 1–0 with a 90th-minute header from Kalidou Koulibaly to close the gap to one point behind Juventus in the league table. Despite this, Juventus ended up winning the 2017–18 Serie A title, four points ahead of second placed Napoli, extending their record-breaking run of consecutive championships to seven.

== Official matches ==
- SF = Semi-final
- QF = Quarter-final
- R16 = Round of 16
- R32 = Round of 32
- GS = Group stage
- R1 = Round 1
- R2 = Round 2
- R3 = Round 3

Juventus win Draw Napoli win

Season	Competition	Date	Home team	Result	Away team
1926–27	Divisione Nazionale	21 November 1926	Napoli	0–3	Juventus
1926–27	Divisione Nazionale	6 March 1927	Juventus	8–0	Napoli
1928–29	Divisione Nazionale	23 December 1928	Juventus	3–1	Napoli
1928–29	Divisione Nazionale	19 May 1929	Napoli	1–0	Juventus
1929–30	Serie A	6 October 1929	Juventus	3–2	Napoli
1929–30	Serie A	23 February 1930	Napoli	2–2	Juventus
1930–31	Serie A	23 November 1930	Juventus	1–2	Napoli
1930–31	Serie A	3 May 1931	Napoli	1–2	Juventus
1931–32	Serie A	27 September 1931	Juventus	5–3	Napoli
1931–32	Serie A	7 February 1932	Napoli	2–0	Juventus
1932–33	Serie A	2 October 1932	Napoli	1–0	Juventus
1932–33	Serie A	5 March 1933	Juventus	3–0	Napoli
1933–34	Serie A	1 November 1933	Napoli	2–0	Juventus
1933–34	Serie A	11 March 1934	Juventus	2–0	Napoli
1934–35	Serie A	7 October 1934	Juventus	2–1	Napoli
1934–35	Serie A	24 February 1935	Napoli	0–0	Juventus
1935–36	Serie A	15 December 1935	Napoli	0–1	Juventus
1935–36	Serie A	12 April 1936	Juventus	2–2	Napoli
1936–37	Serie A	27 September 1936	Napoli	0–1	Juventus
1936–37	Serie A	31 January 1937	Juventus	2–0	Napoli
1936–37	Coppa Italia R16	6 May 1937	Napoli	2–1	Juventus
1937–38	Serie A	10 October 1937	Juventus	2–1	Napoli
1937–38	Serie A	13 February 1938	Napoli	1–1	Juventus
1938–39	Serie A	9 October 1938	Juventus	1–0	Napoli
1938–39	Serie A	19 February 1939	Napoli	4–1	Juventus
1939–40	Serie A	7 January 1940	Napoli	0–0	Juventus
1939–40	Serie A	26 May 1940	Juventus	2–1	Napoli
1940–41	Serie A	27 October 1940	Napoli	2–2	Juventus
1940–41	Serie A	16 February 1941	Juventus	0–0	Napoli
1941–42	Serie A	25 January 1942	Juventus	1–1	Napoli
1941–42	Serie A	7 June 1942	Napoli	4–1	Juventus
1945–46	Serie A-B	9 June 1946	Juventus	6–0	Napoli
1945–46	Serie A-B	28 July 1946	Napoli	1–1	Juventus
1946–47	Serie A	27 October 1946	Juventus	1–0	Napoli
1946–47	Serie A	23 March 1947	Napoli	3–3	Juventus
1947–48	Serie A	16 November 1947	Napoli	0–0	Juventus
1947–48	Serie A	22 April 1948	Juventus	1–3	Napoli
1950–51	Serie A	5 November 1950	Juventus	3–2	Napoli
1950–51	Serie A	18 March 1951	Napoli	1–1	Juventus
1951–52	Serie A	30 December 1951	Napoli	1–2	Juventus
1951–52	Serie A	25 May 1952	Juventus	1–1	Napoli
1952–53	Serie A	18 January 1953	Napoli	3–2	Juventus
1952–53	Serie A	31 May 1953	Juventus	1–1	Napoli
1953–54	Serie A	17 January 1954	Napoli	1–2	Juventus
1953–54	Serie A	30 May 1954	Juventus	3–2	Napoli
1954–55	Serie A	31 October 1954	Juventus	1–1	Napoli
1954–55	Serie A	23 March 1955	Napoli	1–1	Juventus
1955–56	Serie A	4 December 1955	Napoli	1–1	Juventus
1955–56	Serie A	15 April 1956	Juventus	0–1	Napoli
1956–57	Serie A	23 December 1956	Napoli	1–2	Juventus
1956–57	Serie A	28 April 1957	Juventus	1–0	Napoli
1957–58	Serie A	24 November 1957	Juventus	1–3	Napoli
1957–58	Serie A	20 April 1958	Napoli	4–3	Juventus
1958–59	Serie A	12 October 1958	Juventus	2–0	Napoli
1958–59	Serie A	22 February 1959	Napoli	0–0	Juventus
1959–60	Serie A	6 December 1959	Napoli	2–1	Juventus
1959–60	Serie A	17 April 1960	Juventus	4–2	Napoli
1960–61	Serie A	16 January 1961	Juventus	2–2	Napoli
1960–61	Serie A	21 May 1961	Napoli	0–4	Juventus
1962–63	Serie A	4 November 1962	Juventus	1–0	Napoli
1962–63	Serie A	17 March 1963	Napoli	0–0	Juventus
1965–66	Serie A	19 September 1965	Juventus	0–0	Napoli
1965–66	Serie A	6 February 1966	Napoli	1–0	Juventus
1966–67	Serie A	20 November 1966	Napoli	0–1	Juventus
1966–67	Serie A	2 April 1967	Juventus	2–0	Napoli
1967–68	Serie A	9 December 1967	Juventus	1–1	Napoli
1967–68	Serie A	31 March 1968	Napoli	1–2	Juventus
1968–69	Serie A	1 December 1968	Napoli	2–1	Juventus
1968–69	Serie A	6 April 1969	Juventus	2–0	Napoli
1969–70	Serie A	9 November 1969	Napoli	1–0	Juventus
1969–70	Serie A	8 March 1970	Juventus	0–0	Napoli
1970–71	Serie A	8 November 1970	Napoli	1–0	Juventus
1970–71	Serie A	7 March 1971	Juventus	4– 1	Napoli
1971–72	Serie A	28 November 1971	Juventus	2–2	Napoli
1971–72	Serie A	19 March 1972	Napoli	1–1	Juventus
1972–73	Serie A	19 November 1972	Napoli	1–1	Juventus
1972–73	Serie A	17 March 1973	Juventus	0–0	Napoli
1973–74	Serie A	14 October 1973	Napoli	2–0	Juventus
1973–74	Serie A	10 February 1974	Juventus	4–1	Napoli
1974–75	Serie A	15 December 1974	Napoli	2–6	Juventus
1974–75	Serie A	6 April 1975	Juventus	2–1	Napoli
1975–76	Serie A	4 January 1976	Juventus	2–1	Napoli
1975–76	Serie A	18 April 1976	Napoli	1–1	Juventus
1976–77	Serie A	9 January 1977	Napoli	0–2	Juventus
1976–77	Serie A	30 April 1977	Juventus	2–1	Napoli
1977–78	Serie A	18 September 1977	Napoli	1–2	Juventus
1977–78	Serie A	5 February 1978	Juventus	1–0	Napoli
1977–78	Coppa Italia R2	14 May 1978	Napoli	5–0	Juventus
1977–78	Coppa Italia R2	28 May 1978	Juventus	1–0	Napoli
1978–79	Serie A	12 November 1978	Napoli	0–0	Juventus
1978–79	Serie A	18 March 1979	Juventus	1–0	Napoli

Season	Competition	Date	Home team	Result	Away team
1979–80	Serie A	28 October 1979	Juventus	1–0	Napoli
1979–80	Serie A	2 March 1980	Napoli	0–0	Juventus
1980–81	Serie A	25 January 1981	Juventus	1–1	Napoli
1980–81	Serie A	17 May 1981	Napoli	0–1	Juventus
1981–82	Serie A	10 January 1982	Napoli	0–0	Juventus
1981–82	Serie A	9 May 1982	Juventus	0–0	Napoli
1982–83	Serie A	3 October 1982	Juventus	3–0	Napoli
1982–83	Serie A	6 February 1983	Napoli	0–0	Juventus
1983–84	Serie A	25 September 1983	Juventus	2–0	Napoli
1983–84	Serie A	29 January 1984	Napoli	1–1	Juventus
1984–85	Serie A	23 December 1984	Juventus	2–0	Napoli
1984–85	Serie A	5 May 1985	Napoli	0–0	Juventus
1985–86	Serie A	3 November 1985	Napoli	1–0	Juventus
1985–86	Serie A	9 March 1986	Juventus	1–1	Napoli
1986–87	Serie A	9 November 1986	Juventus	1–3	Napoli
1986–87	Serie A	29 March 1987	Napoli	2–1	Juventus
1987–88	Serie A	13 December 1987	Napoli	2–1	Juventus
1987–88	Serie A	17 April 1988	Juventus	3–1	Napoli
1988–89	Serie A	20 November 1988	Juventus	3–5	Napoli
1988–89	UEFA Cup QF	1 March 1989	Juventus	2–0	Napoli
1988–89	UEFA Cup QF	15 March 1989	Napoli	3–0	Juventus
1988–89	Serie A	1 April 1989	Napoli	2–4	Juventus
1989–90	Serie A	26 November 1989	Juventus	1–1	Napoli
1989–90	Serie A	25 March 1990	Napoli	3–1	Juventus
1990–91	Supercoppa Italiana	1 September 1990	Napoli	5–1	Juventus
1990–91	Serie A	6 January 1991	Juventus	1–0	Napoli
1990–91	Serie A	12 May 1991	Napoli	1–1	Juventus
1991–92	Serie A	20 October 1991	Napoli	0–1	Juventus
1991–92	Serie A	8 March 1992	Juventus	3–1	Napoli
1992–93	Serie A	4 October 1992	Napoli	2–3	Juventus
1992–93	Serie A	7 March 1993	Juventus	4–3	Napoli
1993–94	Serie A	5 December 1993	Juventus	1–0	Napoli
1993–94	Serie A	10 April 1994	Napoli	0–0	Juventus
1994–95	Serie A	18 September 1994	Napoli	0–2	Juventus
1994–95	Serie A	19 February 1995	Juventus	1–0	Napoli
1995–96	Serie A	1 October 1995	Juventus	1–1	Napoli
1995–96	Serie A	18 February 1996	Napoli	0–1	Juventus
1996–97	Serie A	3 November 1996	Juventus	1–1	Napoli
1996–97	Serie A	23 March 1997	Napoli	0–0	Juventus
1997–98	Serie A	9 November 1997	Napoli	1–2	Juventus
1997–98	Serie A	14 March 1998	Juventus	2–2	Napoli
1999–2000	Coppa Italia R16	1 December 1999	Napoli	1–3	Juventus
1999–2000	Coppa Italia R16	16 December 1999	Juventus	1–0	Napoli
2000–01	Serie A	30 September 2000	Napoli	1–2	Juventus
2000–01	Serie A	11 February 2001	Juventus	3–0	Napoli
2006–07	Coppa Italia R3	27 August 2006	Napoli	3–3 (Note: Napoli won the match 5–4 on penalties.)	Juventus
2006–07	Serie B	6 November 2006	Napoli	1–1	Juventus
2006–07	Serie B	10 April 2007	Juventus	2–0	Napoli
2007–08	Serie A	27 October 2007	Napoli	3–1	Juventus
2007–08	Serie A	16 March 2008	Juventus	1–0	Napoli
2008–09	Serie A	18 October 2008	Napoli	2–1	Juventus
2008–09	Coppa Italia QF	4 February 2009	Juventus	0–0 (Note: Juventus won the match 4–3 on penalties.)	Napoli
2008–09	Serie A	28 February 2009	Juventus	1–0	Napoli
2009–10	Serie A	31 October 2009	Juventus	2–3	Napoli
2009–10	Coppa Italia R16	13 January 2010	Juventus	3–0	Napoli
2009–10	Serie A	25 March 2010	Napoli	3–1	Juventus
2010–11	Serie A	9 January 2011	Napoli	3–0	Juventus
2010–11	Serie A	22 May 2011	Juventus	2–2	Napoli
2011–12	Serie A	29 November 2011	Napoli	3–3	Juventus
2011–12	Serie A	1 April 2012	Juventus	3–0	Napoli
2011–12	Coppa Italia Final	20 May 2012	Juventus	0–2	Napoli
2012–13	Supercoppa Italiana	11 August 2012	Juventus	4–2	Napoli
2012–13	Serie A	20 October 2012	Juventus	2–0	Napoli
2012–13	Serie A	1 March 2013	Napoli	1–1	Juventus
2013–14	Serie A	10 November 2013	Juventus	3–0	Napoli
2013–14	Serie A	30 March 2014	Napoli	2–0	Juventus
2014–15	Supercoppa Italiana	22 December 2014	Juventus	2–2 (Note: Napoli won the match 6–5 on penalties.)	Napoli
2014–15	Serie A	11 January 2015	Napoli	1–3	Juventus
2014–15	Serie A	23 May 2015	Juventus	3–1	Napoli
2015–16	Serie A	26 September 2015	Napoli	2–1	Juventus
2015–16	Serie A	13 February 2016	Juventus	1–0	Napoli
2016–17	Serie A	29 October 2016	Juventus	2–1	Napoli
2016–17	Coppa Italia SF	28 February 2017	Juventus	3–1	Napoli
2016–17	Serie A	2 April 2017	Napoli	1–1	Juventus
2016–17	Coppa Italia SF	5 April 2017	Napoli	3–2	Juventus
2017–18	Serie A	1 December 2017	Napoli	0–1	Juventus
2017–18	Serie A	22 April 2018	Juventus	0–1	Napoli
2018–19	Serie A	29 September 2018	Juventus	3–1	Napoli
2018–19	Serie A	3 March 2019	Napoli	1–2	Juventus
2019–20	Serie A	31 August 2019	Juventus	4–3	Napoli
2019–20	Serie A	26 January 2020	Napoli	2–1	Juventus
2019–20	Coppa Italia Final	17 June 2020	Napoli	0–0 (Note: Napoli won the match 4–2 on penalties.)	Juventus
2020–21	Supercoppa Italiana	20 January 2021	Juventus	2–0	Napoli
2020–21	Serie A	13 February 2021	Napoli	1–0	Juventus
2020–21	Serie A	7 April 2021	Juventus	2–1	Napoli
2021–22	Serie A	11 September 2021	Napoli	2–1	Juventus
2021–22	Serie A	6 January 2022	Juventus	1–1	Napoli
2022–23	Serie A	13 January 2023	Napoli	5–1	Juventus
2022–23	Serie A	23 April 2023	Juventus	0–1	Napoli
2023–24	Serie A	8 December 2023	Juventus	1–0	Napoli
2023–24	Serie A	3 March 2024	Napoli	2–1	Juventus
2024–25	Serie A	21 September 2024	Juventus	0–0	Napoli
2024–25	Serie A	25 January 2025	Napoli	2–1	Juventus
2025–26	Serie A	7 December 2025	Napoli	2–1	Juventus
2025–26	Serie A	25 January 2026	Juventus	3–0	Napoli
2026–27	Serie A	1 November 2026	Juventus	2–0	Napoli
2026–27	Serie A	13 February 2027	Napoli		Juventus

== Head-to-head ranking in Serie A (1930–2026) ==
P.	30	31	32	33	34	35	36	37	38	39	40	41	42	43	47	48	49	50	51	52	53	54	55	56	57	58	59	60	61	62	63	64	65	66	67	68	69	70	71	72	73	74	75	76	77	78	79	80	81	82	83	84	85	86	87	88	89	90	91	92	93	94	95	96	97	98	99	00	01	02	03	04	05	06	07	08	09	10	11	12	13	14	15	16	17	18	19	20	21	22	23	24	25	26
1		1	1	1	1	1												1		1						1		1	1						1					1	1		1		1	1			1	1		1		1	1			1					1		1	1				1	1		1							1	1	1	1	1	1	1	1	1			1		1	
2									2						2	2					2	2									2					2						2	2	2				2			2				2	2	2			2		2		2				2	2								2				2			2		2	2							2
3	3			3	3						3			3					3															3		3		3	3			3					3		3					3																		3				3			3			3			3					3		3		
4																	4				4					4	4					4	4		4				4											4							4	4		4	4																												4	4			4	
5	5						5	5		5		5										5												5			5							5																																				5			5						5					
6		6											6						6	6			6															6								6	6						6			6						6																6																6
7						7																	7				7										7								7														7				7				7											7	7									7			7			
8							8			8		8			8																									8													8						8																	8																		
9			9																					9	9																9																																																					
10									10																																							10			10																																									10		
11																									11																											11									11																																	
12																														12																																		12													12																	
13								13																				13																																					13																													
14											14													14																																																																						
15													15																																																																																	
16																															16																																																															
17																													17																																								17																									
18																																																																		18																												
19																																																																																														
20																																																																										20																				

• Total: Juventus with 65 higher finishes, Napoli with 15 higher finishes (as of the end of the 2025–26 season). No head-to-heads in 14 seasons, since Napoli was in Serie B. Another one, the 2006–07 season, took place in the Serie B, with Juventus finishing first and Napoli second.

Notes:

- The 1945–46 Italian Football Championship is not included in Serie A statistics.
- Due to the Calciopoli scandal, Juventus' 2004–05 Serie A title was voided. Their 2005–06 Serie A title was awarded to third-placed Inter Milan and they were relegated.

== Statistics ==
As of 1 November 2026

Competition	Total matches played	Juventus victories	Draws	Napoli victories	Juventus goals	Napoli goals
Divisione Nazionale and Serie A-B	6	4	1	1	21	3
Serie A	161	73	49	39	234	179
Serie B	2	1	1	0	3	1
Total (league)	169	78	51	40	258	183
Coppa Italia	12	5	3	4	17	17
Supercoppa Italiana	4	2	1	1	9	9
UEFA Cup	2	1	0	1	2	3
Total (official)	187	86	55	46	286	212
Other meetings	7	3	4	0	6	2
Total	194	89	59	46	292	214

== Trophies ==
As of 22 December 2025

- Numbers with this background denote the competition record.

Juventus	Competition	Napoli
Domestic
36	Serie A	4
15	Coppa Italia	6
9	Supercoppa Italiana	3
60	Domestic total	13
International
2	UEFA Champions League	—
1	UEFA Cup Winners' Cup (defunct)	—
3	UEFA Europa League	1
2	UEFA Super Cup	—
1	UEFA Intertoto Cup (defunct)	—
2	Intercontinental Cup (defunct)	—
11	International total	1
71	Grand total	14
