= 2020 Coppa Italia final =

72nd Coppa Italia final
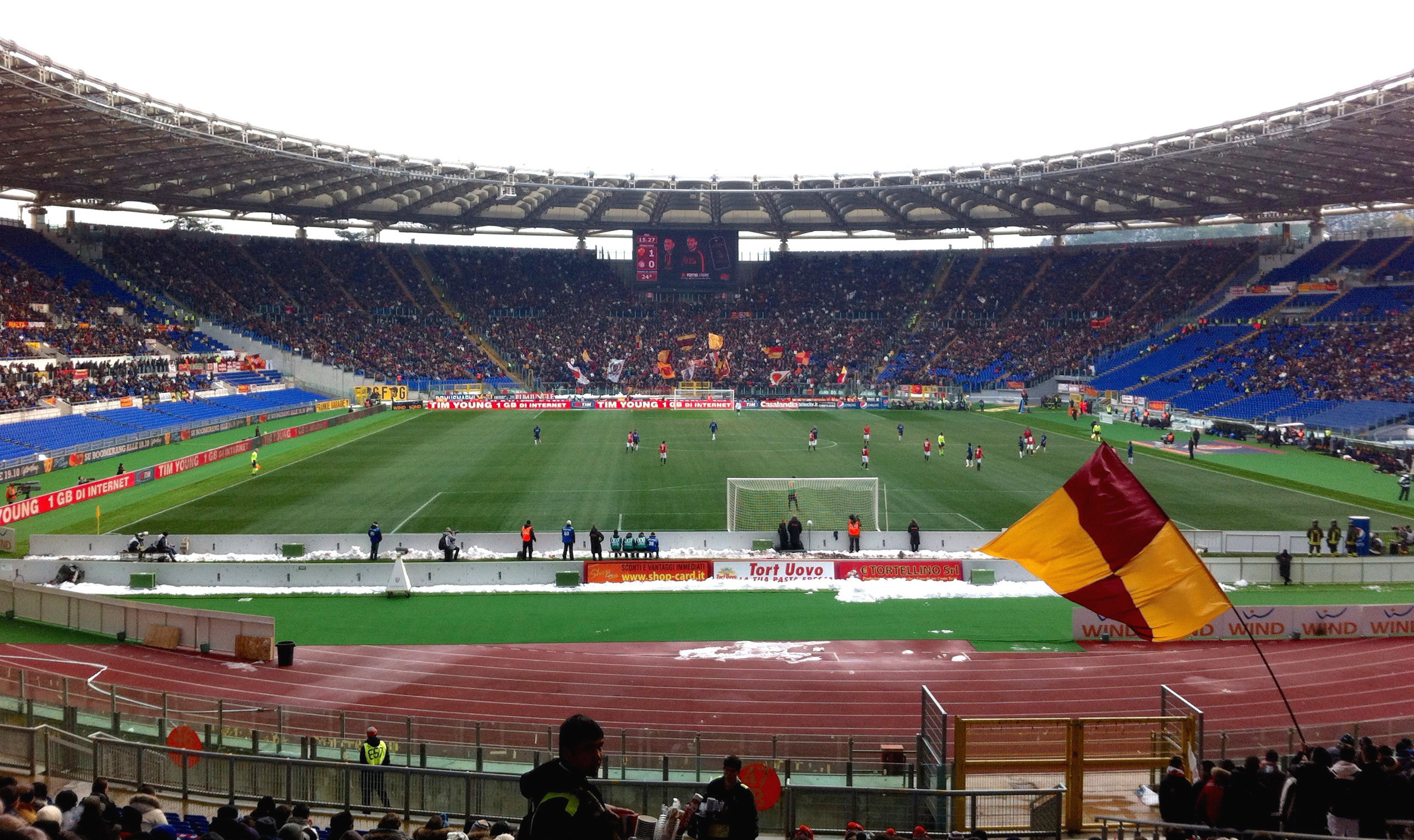
- The Stadio Olimpico in Rome hosted the final
- Event: 2019–20 Coppa Italia
Napoli	Juventus
0	0
- Napoli won 4–2 on penalties
- Date: 17 June 2020
- Venue: Stadio Olimpico, Rome
- Referee: Daniele Doveri
- Attendance: 0 (Note: The final was played behind closed doors due to the COVID-19 pandemic in Italy.)

The 2020 Coppa Italia final decided the winners of the 2019–20 Coppa Italia, Italy's main football cup.

It was originally scheduled to be played on 13 May 2020, at the Stadio Olimpico in Rome. However, due to the COVID-19 pandemic in Italy, it was first postponed to 20 May, and then to 17 June. Following the second leg of both semi-finals, also delayed until 12 and 13 June 2020, the finalists were determined to be Napoli and Juventus. Napoli won the match 4–2 on penalties after a goalless draw.

As the cup winners, Napoli automatically qualified to the group stage of the 2020–21 UEFA Europa League and to the 2020 Supercoppa Italiana against the champions of the 2019–20 Serie A, Juventus.

== Background ==
Napoli appeared in the final for the 10th time, with a record of five wins and four losses in their first nine appearances. It was a record 19th appearance for Juventus in a Coppa Italia final, and fifth appearance in the last six years. Going into the final, Juventus had won in 13 of their 18 final appearances. The teams had met in the final only once in 2012, a match Napoli won 2–0.

== Road to the final ==
Note: In all results below, the score of the finalist is given first (H: home; A: away).

Napoli		Round	Juventus
Opponent	Result	2019–20 Coppa Italia	Opponent	Result
Perugia (H)	2–0	Round of 16	Udinese (H)	4–0
Lazio (H)	1–0	Quarter-finals	Roma (H)	3–1
Internazionale	1–0 (A), 1–1 (H) (2–1 agg.)	Semi-finals	Milan	1–1 (A), 0–0 (H) (1–1 (a) agg.)

== Match ==
=== Details ===
17 June 2020
21:00 CEST (UTC+2)

Napoli	0–0	Juventus
	Report
Penalties
Insigne (penalty scored); Politano (penalty scored); Maksimović (penalty scored); Milik (penalty scored)	4–2	(penalty missed) Dybala; (penalty missed) Danilo; (penalty scored) Bonucci; (penalty scored) Ramsey

Stadio Olimpico, Rome
Attendance: 0
Referee: Daniele Doveri

Napoli	Juventus

GK	1	(Italy) Alex Meret
RB	22	(Italy) Giovanni Di Lorenzo
CB	19	(Serbia) Nikola Maksimović
CB	26	(Senegal) Kalidou Koulibaly
LB	6	(Portugal) Mário Rui	(yellow card) 77'	(substituted off) 81'
CM	8	(Spain) Fabián Ruiz		(substituted off) 80'
CM	4	(Germany) Diego Demme
CM	20	(Poland) Piotr Zieliński		(substituted off) 88'
RF	7	(Spain) José Callejón		(substituted off) 66'
CF	14	(Belgium) Dries Mertens		(substituted off) 67'
LF	24	(Italy) Lorenzo Insigne (c)
Substitutes:
GK	27	(Greece) Orestis Karnezis
DF	13	(Italy) Sebastiano Luperto
DF	23	(Albania) Elseid Hysaj		(substituted on) 81'
DF	31	(Algeria) Faouzi Ghoulam
DF	44	(Greece) Kostas Manolas
MF	5	(Brazil) Allan		(substituted on) 80'
MF	12	(North Macedonia) Eljif Elmas		(substituted on) 88'
MF	34	(Germany) Amin Younes
FW	9	(Spain) Fernando Llorente
FW	11	(Mexico) Hirving Lozano
FW	21	(Italy) Matteo Politano		(substituted on) 66'
FW	99	(Poland) Arkadiusz Milik		(substituted on) 67'
Manager:
(Italy) Gennaro Gattuso

GK	77	(Italy) Gianluigi Buffon
RB	16	(Colombia) Juan Cuadrado		(substituted off) 85'
CB	4	(Netherlands) Matthijs de Ligt
CB	19	(Italy) Leonardo Bonucci (c)	(yellow card) 51'
LB	12	(Brazil) Alex Sandro
CM	30	(Uruguay) Rodrigo Bentancur
CM	5	(Bosnia and Herzegovina) Miralem Pjanić		(substituted off) 74'
CM	14	(France) Blaise Matuidi
RW	11	(Brazil) Douglas Costa		(substituted off) 65'
CF	10	(Argentina) Paulo Dybala	(yellow card) 83'
LW	7	(Portugal) Cristiano Ronaldo
Substitutes:
GK	1	(Poland) Wojciech Szczęsny
GK	31	(Italy) Carlo Pinsoglio
DF	2	(Italy) Mattia De Sciglio
DF	13	(Brazil) Danilo		(substituted on) 65'
DF	24	(Italy) Daniele Rugani
MF	8	(Wales) Aaron Ramsey		(substituted on) 85'
MF	25	(France) Adrien Rabiot
MF	38	(Italy) Simone Muratore
FW	33	(Italy) Federico Bernardeschi		(substituted on) 74'
FW	35	(Italy) Marco Olivieri
FW	44	(Albania) Giacomo Vrioni
FW	46	(Italy) Luca Zanimacchia
Manager:
(Italy) Maurizio Sarri

Assistant referees:
Giacomo Paganessi
Stefano Alassio
Fourth official:
Gianpaolo Calvarese
Video assistant referee:
Massimiliano Irrati
Assistant video assistant referees:
Giorgio Schenone

Match rules

- 90 minutes.
- Penalty shoot-out if scores level.
- Twelve named substitutes.
- Maximum of five substitutions. (Note: Each team was given three opportunities to make substitutions, excluding substitutions made at half-time.)

== See also ==
- 2019–20 Juventus FC season
- 2019–20 SSC Napoli season
- Juventus FC–SSC Napoli rivalry
