= Alex Meret =

Italian footballer (born 1997)

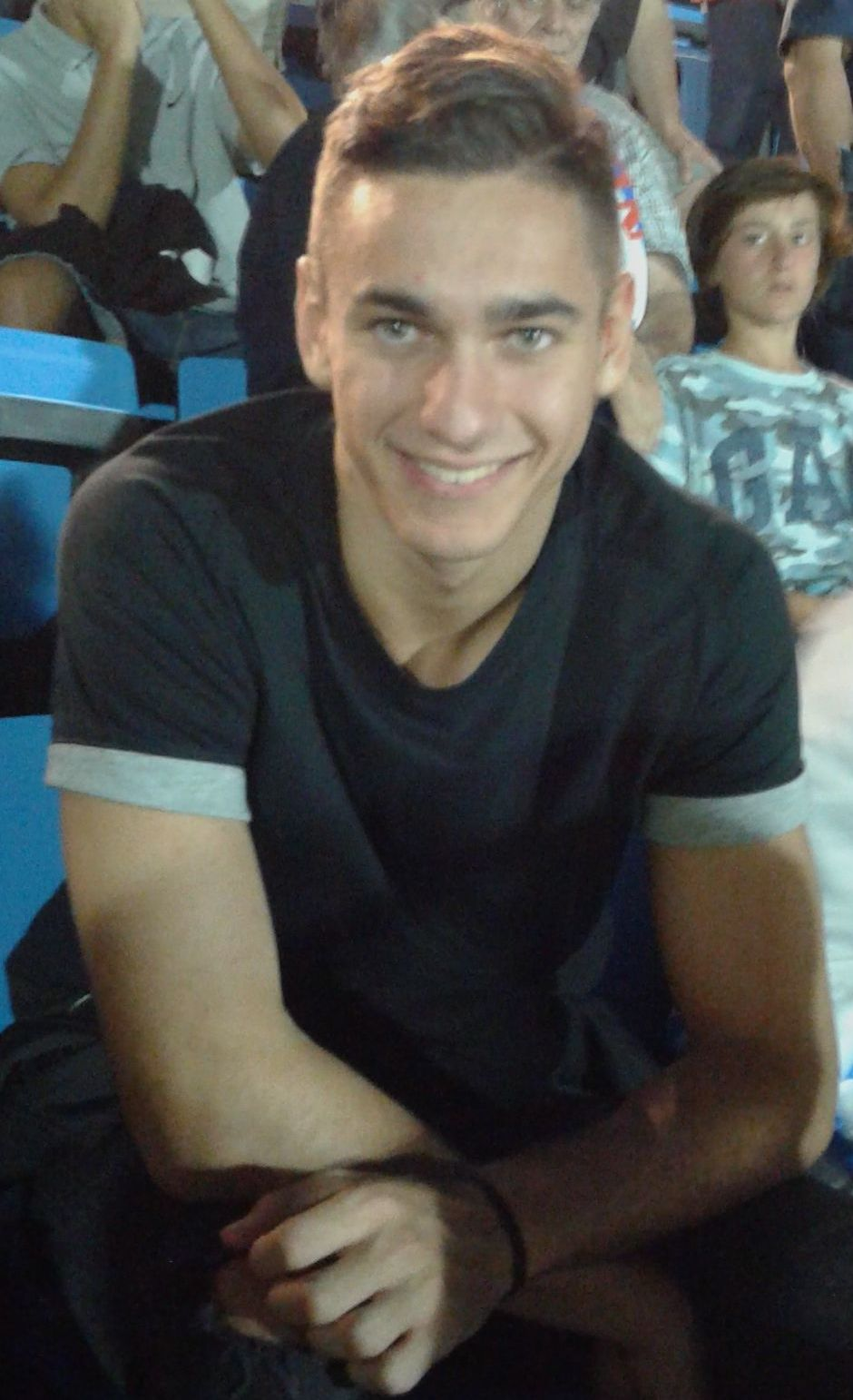
- Meret in 2017

Personal information
- Full name: Alex Meret
- Date of birth: 22 March 1997 (age 29)
- Place of birth: Udine, Italy
- Height: 1.90 m (6 ft 3 in)
- Position: Goalkeeper

Team information
- Current team: Napoli
- Number: 1

Youth career
- 2007–2012: Donatello Calcio
- 2012–2015: Udinese

Senior career*
| Years | Team | Apps | (Gls) |
| 2015–2018 | Udinese | 0 | (0) |
| 2016–2017 | → SPAL (loan) | 30 | (0) |
| 2017–2018 | → SPAL (loan) | 13 | (0) |
| 2018– | Napoli | 182 | (0) |

International career^{‡}
| 2012–2013 | Italy U16 | 4 | (0) |
| 2013–2014 | Italy U17 | 13 | (0) |
| 2014 | Italy U18 | 2 | (0) |
| 2014–2016 | Italy U19 | 19 | (0) |
| 2018–2019 | Italy U21 | 5 | (0) |
| 2019–2022 | Italy | 3 | (0) |
Medal record
Men's Football
Representing Italy
UEFA European Championship
| Winner | 2020 Europe |
UEFA Nations League
| Third place | 2021 Italy |
| Third place | 2023 Netherlands |
CONMEBOL–UEFA Cup of Champions
| Runner-up | 2022 England |
UEFA European Under-19 Championship
| Runner-up | 2016 Germany |
- * Club domestic league appearances and goals as of 23:11, 1 November 2026 (UTC) ‡ National team caps and goals as of 16 November 2022

Alex Meret Cavaliere OMRI (Italian pronunciation: [ˈaːleks meˈrɛt]; born 22 March 1997) is an Italian professional footballer who plays as a goalkeeper for Serie A club Napoli and the Italy national team.

Born in Udine, Meret began his career at an early age with amateur club Donatello Calcio before making a switch to the famous Udinese youth system in 2012. After rising through the academy system at the club, he made his senior debut in 2015. He later had spells on loan with SPAL, whom he helped win the Serie B title in 2017, and achieve promotion to Serie A. He joined Napoli in 2018, winning a league title in 2023 and 2025.

At international level, Meret has represented Italy at U16, U17, U18, U19 and U21 levels, and made his senior debut for Italy in 2019, also representing the nation at their victorious UEFA Euro 2020 campaign.

== Club career ==
=== Udinese ===
An Udinese youth product, Meret was promoted to the first team as second-choice goalkeeper behind Orestis Karnezis during the 2015–16 season. He made his senior professional debut on 2 December 2015 in the Coppa Italia against Atalanta.

In July 2016, Meret was sent on loan to Serie B club SPAL. He returned to SPAL on loan for the 2017–18 season.

=== Napoli ===
On 5 July 2018, Meret signed with Napoli until 30 June 2023. The transfer fee agreed with Udinese was reported as €35 million. He made his European debut on 14 February 2019, in a 3–1 away win over FC Zürich in the first leg of the round of 32 of the Europa League.

During his first two seasons with Napoli, he was frequently used in a rotational role alongside David Ospina. However, under the club's new manager Gennaro Gattuso, he found himself relegated to the bench until the season break due to the COVID-19 pandemic in March 2020. The coach favoured the Colombian shot-stopper due to his superior ability with the ball at his feet. Following a suspension to Ospina, Meret started in the 2020 Coppa Italia Final against Juventus on 17 June. After a goalless draw in regulation time, Meret saved Paulo Dybala's spot kick, contributing to his team's 4–2 penalty shoot-out victory. Subsequently, Meret found himself back in rotation with Ospina, starting about half of the matches until the end of the season. This rotational role continued into the following 2020–21 season, with Ospina and Meret alternating every other match in the Europa League, Serie A, and Coppa Italia. However, in the next season, Meret assumed the role as the second goalkeeper in the league for the majority of the season under the new coach Luciano Spalletti. He was the first-choice keeper in the UEFA Europa League and the Coppa Italia.

In the subsequent 2022–23 season, Meret regained the role as the starting goalkeeper for Napoli after Ospina departed the club. He played the majority of the games in Serie A and the Champions League, playing a crucial role in winning the first scudetto in 33 years and reaching the quarterfinals of the Champions League.

== International career ==
Meret was a crucial member in the Italy U19 national team which took part in the 2016 UEFA European Under-19 Championship, finishing as runner-up after losing in the final; he was named in the team of the tournament alongside Kylian Mbappé of France.

In March 2017, following impressive performances for SPAL in Serie B, he was called up to the Italy national team squad for the World Cup qualification for a match against Albania and a friendly against the Netherlands.

On 22 March 2018, he made his debut with the Italy U21, playing as starter in a friendly match against Norway.

He took part in the 2019 UEFA European Under-21 Championship under manager Luigi Di Biagio, as the team's first-choice goalkeeper.

Meret made his international debut for the senior national team under manager Roberto Mancini, on 18 November 2019, coming on as a substitute for Salvatore Sirigu in a 9–1 home win over Armenia, in Italy's final Euro 2020 qualifier.

In June 2021, he was included in Italy's squad for UEFA Euro 2020. On 11 July, Meret won the European Championship with Italy following a 3–2 penalty shoot-out victory over England at Wembley Stadium in the final, after a 1–1 draw in extra-time. He was the only squad member not to make an appearance in the competition.

In June 2024, he was included in Italy's final squad for UEFA Euro 2024, as a back-up goalkeeper to Gianluigi Donnarumma, by manager Luciano Spalletti. Italy were eliminated from the tournament in the round of 16 following a 2–0 loss to Switzerland.

== Style of play ==
Considered to be one of the best goalkeepers in Serie A, Meret is known for his powerful physique, and goalkeeping technique, and possesses excellent reflexes and agility, despite his size, which makes him an effective shot-stopper. He is also known for his consistency, as well as ability to rush off his line quickly to collect the ball, or punch away crosses, even though these were once considered areas of weakness. Moreover, throughout his career, he has stood out for his penalty-stopping abilities. His distribution and ability with his feet have been cited as areas in need of improvement, however.

== Career statistics ==
=== Club ===
As of match played 4 November 2026

Appearances and goals by club, season and competition
| Club | Season | League | | | Coppa Italia | | Europe | | Other | | Total | |
| Club | Season | Division | Apps | Goals | Apps | Goals | Apps | Goals | Apps | Goals | Apps | Goals |
|---|---|---|---|---|---|---|---|---|---|---|---|---|
| Udinese | 2015–16 | Serie A | 0 | 0 | 2 | 0 | — | | — | | 2 | 0 |
| SPAL (loan) | 2016–17 | Serie B | 30 | 0 | 2 | 0 | — | | — | | 32 | 0 |
| SPAL (loan) | 2017–18 | Serie A | 13 | 0 | 0 | 0 | — | | — | | 13 | 0 |
| SPAL (loan) | Total | | 43 | 0 | 2 | 0 | — | | — | | 45 | 0 |
| Napoli | 2018–19 | Serie A | 14 | 0 | 1 | 0 | 6 (Note: Appearances in UEFA Europa League) | 0 | — | | 21 | 0 |
| Napoli | 2019–20 | Serie A | 22 | 0 | 1 | 0 | 6 (Note: Appearance(s) in UEFA Champions League) | 0 | — | | 29 | 0 |
| Napoli | 2020–21 | Serie A | 22 | 0 | 1 | 0 | 5 | 0 | 0 | 0 | 28 | 0 |
| Napoli | 2021–22 | Serie A | 7 | 0 | 1 | 0 | 7 | 0 | — | | 15 | 0 |
| Napoli | 2022–23 | Serie A | 34 | 0 | 1 | 0 | 10 | 0 | — | | 45 | 0 |
| Napoli | 2023–24 | Serie A | 31 | 0 | 0 | 0 | 8 | 0 | 0 | 0 | 39 | 0 |
| Napoli | 2024–25 | Serie A | 34 | 0 | 1 | 0 | — | | — | | 35 | 0 |
| Napoli | 2025–26 | Serie A | 11 | 0 | 0 | 0 | 1 | 0 | 0 | 0 | 12 | 0 |
| Napoli | 2026–27 | Serie A | 7 | 0 | 0 | 0 | 3 | 0 | — | | 10 | 0 |
| Napoli | Total | | 182 | 0 | 6 | 0 | 46 | 0 | 0 | 0 | 234 | 0 |
| Career total | | | 225 | 0 | 10 | 0 | 46 | 0 | 0 | 0 | 281 | 0 |

=== International ===
As of match played 16 November 2022

Appearances and goals by national team and year
| National team | Year | Apps | Goals |
|---|---|---|---|
| Italy | 2017 | 0 | 0 |
| Italy | 2019 | 1 | 0 |
| Italy | 2020 | 0 | 0 |
| Italy | 2021 | 1 | 0 |
| Italy | 2022 | 1 | 0 |
| Italy | 2023 | 0 | 0 |
| Italy | 2024 | 0 | 0 |
| Italy | 2025 | 0 | 0 |
| Total | | 3 | 0 |

== Honours ==
SPAL

- Serie B: 2016–17

Napoli

- Serie A: 2022–23, 2024–25
- Coppa Italia: 2019–20

Italy U19

- UEFA Euro U-19 Championship runners-up: 2016

Italy

- UEFA European Championship: 2020
- UEFA Nations League third place: 2020–21, 2022–23

Individual

- Primavera Girone B Goalkeeper of the Year: 2014–15
- UEFA European Under-19 Championship team of the tournament: 2016
- Serie B Goalkeeper of the Year: 2016–17
- UEFA Champions League Breakthrough XI: 2019

Orders

- 5th Class / Knight: Cavaliere Ordine al Merito della Repubblica Italiana: 2021
