= Mário Rui =

Portuguese footballer (born 1991)

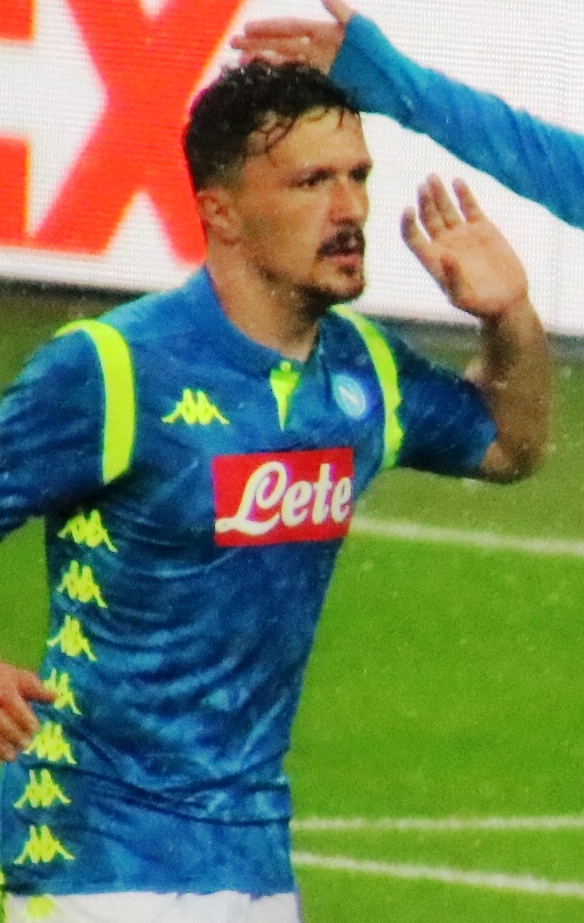
- Mário Rui with Napoli in 2019

Personal information
- Full name: Mário Rui Silva Duarte
- Date of birth: 27 May 1991 (age 35)
- Place of birth: Sines, Portugal
- Height: 1.68 m (5 ft 6 in)
- Position: Left-back

Team information
- Current team: Belenenses
- Number: 6

Youth career
- 2001–2003: Vasco Gama Sines
- 2003–2007: Sporting CP
- 2008: Valencia
- 2009–2010: Benfica

Senior career*
Years	Team	Apps	(Gls)
2010–2011	Benfica	0	(0)
2010–2011	→ Fátima (loan)	25	(1)
2011–2013	Parma	0	(0)
2011–2012	→ Gubbio (loan)	31	(2)
2012–2013	→ Spezia (loan)	23	(0)
2013–2017	Empoli	96	(0)
2016–2017	→ Roma (loan)	5	(0)
2017–2018	Roma	0	(0)
2017–2018	→ Napoli (loan)	25	(2)
2018–2024	Napoli	148	(1)
2026	Forte Virtus	12	(1)
2026–	Belenenses	0	(0)

International career
2006–2007	Portugal U16	8	(0)
2007–2008	Portugal U17	5	(0)
2008–2010	Portugal U19	18	(0)
2010–2011	Portugal U20	17	(1)
2011	Portugal U21	3	(0)
2018–2022	Portugal	12	(0)
Medal record
Men's football
Representing Portugal
UEFA Nations League
Winner	2019 Portugal
FIFA U-20 World Cup
Runner-up	2011 Colombia
- * Club domestic league appearances and goals as of 23:53, 14 April 2024 (UTC)

Mário Rui Silva Duarte CvIH (born 27 May 1991), known as Mário Rui, is a Portuguese professional footballer who plays as a left-back for Liga 3 club Belenenses.

Developed at Benfica, he spent most of his career in Italy, making 248 appearances in Serie A for Empoli, Roma and Napoli and winning the 2022–23 Serie A and the 2019–20 Coppa Italia with the last of those clubs.

Mário Rui was part of the Portugal squad at the 2018 World Cup.

== Club career ==
=== Early years and Empoli ===
Born in Sines, Setúbal District, Mário Rui started his career at local Vasco da Gama Atlético Clube. He then played for the youth teams of Sporting CP, Valencia and Benfica, being signed by Parma in summer 2011 and being loaned immediately to fellow Italians Gubbio; he joined the Serie B club following that year's FIFA U-20 World Cup, with the international transfer certificate arriving on 2 September.

In June 2012, Parma signed Mário Rui for €595,000 on a five-year contract (paid to Gubbio), effectively on 1 July. Also that month, he joined Spezia on a temporary deal for free.

Mário Rui moved to Empoli on 28 June 2013, for €550,000. He contributed 26 matches in his first season, as his new team returned to Serie A after a six-year absence.

In June 2014, Parma gave up the remaining 50% rights of Mário Rui to Empoli. He first appeared in the Italian top flight on 31 August, coming on as a 66th-minute substitute for Elseid Hysaj in a 2–0 away loss against Udinese.

=== Roma ===
On 8 July 2016, Mário Rui agreed to a temporary deal at Roma for a loan fee of €3 million, plus €1.5 million in bonuses, with a conditional obligation to sign him outright for an additional €6 million. He started the season injured, only making his debut on 19 January 2017 when he played 78 minutes in a 4–0 home win over Sampdoria in the Coppa Italia.

=== Napoli ===
On 13 July 2017, Mário Rui joined Napoli on an initial €3.75 million loan; depending on the achievement of certain sporting targets, the club would have an obligation to buy him outright for a further €5.5 million. He made his debut in the seventh game of the season at home to Cagliari on 1 October, as a late substitute in a 3–0 win. His first goal in the Italian top division came the following 10 February, helping the hosts to defeat Lazio 4–1. He became the starting left-back after Faouzi Ghoulam's knee injury in November, and in April his agent threatened to find him a new team if he would not retain that place after the Algeria international's recovery.

Mário Rui played the first 81 minutes of the 2020 Coppa Italia final on 17 June, which Napoli won on penalties after a goalless draw with Juventus. On 6 August, he extended his contract to 2025, with an annual salary of €2.5 million. He and Ghoulam were both dropped by manager Gennaro Gattuso for the 1–0 victory at Bologna on 8 November for breaking curfew.

Mário Rui made 22 appearances in the 2022–23 campaign, helping Napoli to their first league title in 33 years. On 30 December 2024, he left the Stadio Diego Armando Maradona by mutual consent, with 227 games and 26 assists to his credit.

=== Later career ===
Subsequently, Mário Rui represented Forte Virtus in the UAE Second Division League. The 35-year-old returned to his country in October 2026, signing for Belenenses of Liga 3.

== International career ==
All youth levels comprised, Mário Rui earned 51 caps for Portugal. During the 2011 FIFA U-20 World Cup he appeared in five out of seven matches for the eventual finalists, scoring his only goal for his country in a 1–0 group stage victory over New Zealand. His debut with the under-21 team arrived on 5 September 2011, when he played the entirety of a 1–0 friendly defeat of France.

In March 2018, Mário Rui was called by full side manager Fernando Santos for exhibition games with Egypt and the Netherlands as a replacement for the injured Fábio Coentrão, making his debut against the latter by playing the full 90 minutes in the 3–0 loss in Switzerland. He was included in the final 23-man squad for the 2018 FIFA World Cup in Russia.

In September 2022, Santos called Mário Rui up for the first time in nearly two years in place of the injured Raphaël Guerreiro, for UEFA Nations League fixtures against the Czech Republic and Spain; he started the first fixture in Prague, a 4–0 win. The following month, he was one of 55 players pre-selected for the 2022 World Cup in Qatar.

== Career statistics ==
=== Club ===
As of match played 14 April 2024

Appearances and goals by club, season and competition
Club	Season	League			National cup (Note: Includes Taça de Portugal, Coppa Italia)		Continental		Other		Total	
Club	Season	Division	Apps	Goals	Apps	Goals	Apps	Goals	Apps	Goals	Apps	Goals
Fátima (loan)	2010–11	Segunda Liga	25	1	5	0	—		—		30	1
Gubbio (loan)	2011–12	Serie B	31	2	1	0	—		—		32	2
Spezia (loan)	2012–13	Serie B	23	0	1	0	—		—		24	0
Empoli	2013–14	Serie B	26	0	1	0	—		—		27	0
Empoli	2014–15	Serie A	34	0	3	0	—		—		37	0
Empoli	2015–16	Serie A	36	0	1	0	—		—		37	0
Empoli	Total		96	0	5	0	—		—		101	0
Roma (loan)	2016–17	Serie A	5	0	2	0	2 (Note: Appearances in UEFA Europa League)	0	—		9	0
Napoli (loan)	2017–18	Serie A	25	2	1	0	4 (Note: Two appearances in UEFA Champions League, two appearances in UEFA Europa League)	0	—		30	2
Napoli	2018–19	Serie A	20	1	1	0	10 (Note: Six appearances in UEFA Champions League, four appearances in UEFA Europa League)	0	—		31	1
Napoli	2019–20	Serie A	24	0	4	0	7 (Note: Appearances in UEFA Champions League)	0	—		35	0
Napoli	2020–21	Serie A	27	0	2	0	6	0	1 (Note: Appearances in Supercoppa Italiana)	0	36	0
Napoli	2021–22	Serie A	34	0	0	0	5	0	—		39	0
Napoli	2022–23	Serie A	22	0	0	0	6	0	—		28	0
Napoli	2023–24	Serie A	21	0	1	0	4	0	2	0	28	0
Napoli	Total		173	3	9	0	42	0	3	0	227	3
Belenenses	2026–27	Liga 3	0	0	—		—		—		0	0
Career total			347	6	22	0	42	0	3	0	414	6

=== International ===
National team	Year	Apps	Goals
Portugal	2018	8	0
Portugal	2019	1	0
Portugal	2020	2	0
Portugal	2022	1	0
Total		12	0

== Honours ==
Napoli

- Serie A: 2022–23
- Coppa Italia: 2019–20

Portugal U20

- FIFA U-20 World Cup runner-up: 2011

Portugal

- UEFA Nations League: 2018–19

Orders

- Knight of the Order of Prince Henry
