= Fabrizio Pasqua =

Italian Football referee

Fabrizio Pasqua is an Italian football referee in Serie A.

== Career ==
=== Early Career (1998 - 2013) ===
Pasqua began his career as a referee in 1998 in Serie D, subsequently working as a referee for Serie C, Lega Pro, Serie B and finally Serie A. His Serie A debut took place on 11 May 2013, in Catania - Pescara (1-0), assisted by the assistants Maurizio Liberti and Giovanni Colella.

He has also refereed in the Coppa Italia.

=== Serie-A (2013 - present) ===
In the 2017-2018 season, he refereed 15 matches. He won the Stefano Farina Award in 2019.
