= Kalidou Koulibaly =

Senegalese footballer (born 1991)

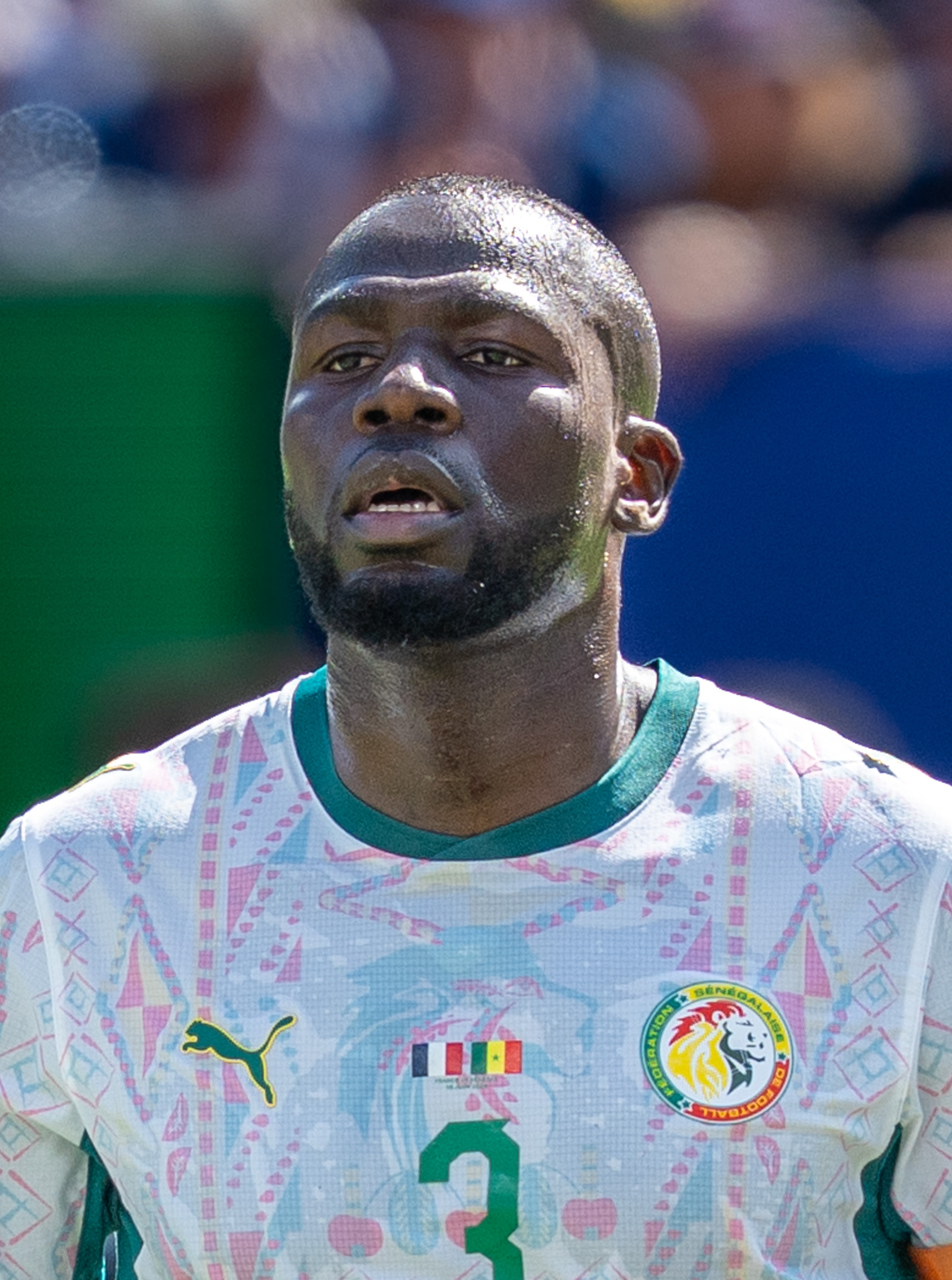
- Koulibaly with Senegal at the 2026 FIFA World Cup

Personal information
- Full name: Kalidou Koulibaly
- Date of birth: 20 June 1991 (age 35)
- Place of birth: Saint-Dié-des-Vosges, France
- Height: 1.86 m (6 ft 1 in)
- Position: Centre-back

Team information
- Current team: Al-Hilal
- Number: 3

Youth career
- 1999–2003: Saint-Dié
- 2003–2006: Metz
- 2006–2009: Saint-Dié
- 2009–2010: Metz

Senior career*
Years	Team	Apps	(Gls)
2009–2011	Metz II	31	(2)
2010–2012	Metz	41	(1)
2012–2014	Genk	64	(3)
2014–2022	Napoli	236	(13)
2022–2023	Chelsea	23	(2)
2023–	Al-Hilal	89	(5)

International career^{‡}
2011–2012	France U20	11	(0)
2015–	Senegal	108	(2)
Medal record
Men's football
Representing Senegal
Africa Cup of Nations
Winner	2021
Runner-up	2019
Runner-up	2025
- * Club domestic league appearances and goals as of 21:17, 31 October 2026 (UTC) ‡ National team caps and goals as of 21:40, 12 November 2026 (UTC)

Kalidou Koulibaly (born 20 June 1991) is a professional footballer who plays as a centre-back for Saudi Pro League club Al-Hilal. Born in France, he plays for and captains the Senegal national team.

Koulibaly began his professional club career with French team Metz in 2010, before moving to Belgian club Genk in 2012, winning the Belgian Cup in his first season. He joined Italian team Napoli in 2014, where he won the Supercoppa Italiana title; he also won the Coppa Italia in 2020.

As Koulibaly was born in France to Senegalese parents, he was eligible to represent both nations at international level, and initially played for the France national under-20 team. He later made his senior debut with Senegal in 2015, and was a member of the Senegal squad that participated in the 2017 Africa Cup of Nations. He was named to the side that represented Senegal at the 2018 FIFA World Cup the following year, and subsequently helped his team to the final of the 2019 Africa Cup of Nations. Koulibaly and Senegal then won the 2021 and finished as runner-up in the 2025 edition of the tournament, defeating Egypt and forfeiting against Morocco in the respective finals.

== Early life ==
Koulibaly was born on 20 June 1991 to Senegalese parents in Saint-Dié-des-Vosges, France. His father worked in a textile mill in Senegal for seven days a week and never took weekends off for five years before he saved enough money to take his mother to France. He grew up in Saint-Dié-des-Vosges, revealing that: "When you grow up in this environment, you see everyone as your brother. We are black, white, Arab, African, Muslim, Christian, yes — but we are all French. We are all hungry, so let’s go have a Turkish meal together. Or tonight, let’s all go to my house and eat Senegalese food. Yes, we have differences, but we are all equal." Koulibaly says his upbringing was "heavily influenced by the multi-cultural nature" growing up.

Koulibaly revealed that he first started playing football, saying: "All the kids were running around playing football with no shoes, and I was really upset by this, I guess. My mom says that I was begging her to go to the store and buy shoes for everybody, so I could play football with them. But my mother said, “Kalidou, just take your shoes off. Go play like they do.” In the end, I threw off my shoes and went to play barefoot with my cousins — and this is where my football story begins. When we got back to France, I was playing every day in the little park by our house." His footballing career began with local club Saint-Dié. He then joined Metz in his first spell but was subsequently released at fifteen; according to the club's academy manager, Denis Schaeffer, Koulibaly was let go "because he was too introverted, and his level was a little below our expectations."

== Club career ==
=== Early career ===
Koulibaly began his career playing for his hometown club Saint-Dié's youth team; he spent two seasons playing for the club's team in the Championnat de France Amateur 2, before joining the youth academy of professional club Metz on 1 July 2009. While at Metz, Koulibaly helped the club's under-19 team win the 2009–10 Coupe Gambardella after the team defeated Sochaux 5–4 on penalties in the final. He also played for the club's amateur team in the Championnat de France Amateur appearing in 15 matches as Metz were crowned champions of the league finishing with 107 points.

=== Metz ===
Prior to the start of the 2010–11 season, Koulibaly signed his first professional contract agreeing to a one-year deal. He was, subsequently, promoted to the senior team by new manager Dominique Bijotat. Koulibaly made his professional debut on 20 August 2010 in a league match against Vannes. He appeared as a substitute in a 1–0 victory. Following this, Koulibaly became a first team regular for the side after dispatching the place from Nuno Frechaut. On 15 April 2011, he scored his first goal for Metz, as they drew 3–3 against Clermont. Three days later, Koulibaly signed a three–year contract extension with the club, keeping him until 2014. At the end of the 2010–11 season, he went on to make nineteen appearances and scoring once in all competitions. Reflecting on his first season at Metz, Manager Bijotat was quoted as saying of him: "Kalidou Koulibaly is perhaps the one who surprised the most people, while being the one who surprised me the least personally. I knew that it would come to him because it was already showing a good maturity. He's always in the right mood and does not catch fire, it's important to the job he's doing. He also knows how to analyze his own matches, which brings him to a certain regularity in his performances. Conversely, we thought Yeni Ngbakoto was the closest to the group, but it took longer to come. He had a difficult start, between suspension and injury. It took him longer to settle on the team. His game was not settled, in this area he has progressed in recent weeks and must still win in consistency".

However, at the start of the 2011–12 season, Koulibaly missed the first five league matches of the season, due to international commitments. His first appearance of the 2011–12 season came on 9 September 2011, coming as a substitute in the 60th minutes, in a 2–2 draw with Laval. However, he served a two match suspension after being sent–off for an unprofessional conduct on Guillaume Moullec, as Metz lost 1–0 on 30 September 2011. Despite this, Koulibaly returned to the first team and then captained the side for the first time on 2 December 2011, in a 2–0 win over Monaco. He continued to regain his first team place until suspension and injury, which eventually kept him out for the rest of the 2011–12 season. At the end of the 2011–12 season, Koulibaly went on to make 23 appearances in all competitions, including ten alongside his future international teammate Sadio Mané.

=== Genk ===
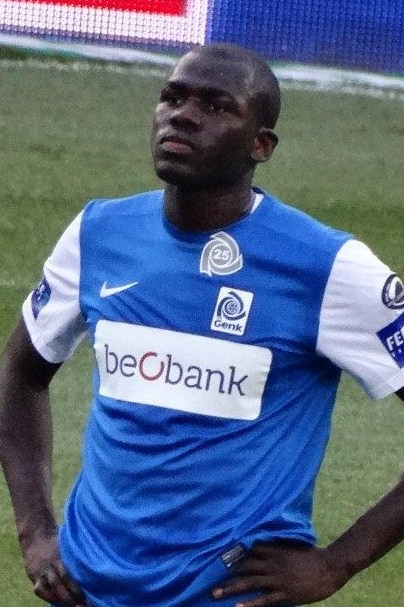
Koulibaly playing for Genk in 2014

Koulibaly joined Belgian club Genk on 29 June 2012 after agreeing a four-year contract. On 23 August, he made his Genk debut in a UEFA Europa League play-off qualifying round, in which they were defeated by Swiss team Luzern 2–1 in the first leg of two. Since joining the club, he became a first team regular for the side, playing mostly in the centre–back position. In a match against OH Leuven on 25 November 2012, Koulibaly made a foul in the penalty box at the last minute of the game, which was successfully converted by Ibou, as Genk drew 1–1. On 23 December 2012, Koulibaly scored his first Racing Genk goal in a 4–2 home defeat to Anderlecht, in which he scored a free header from a corner, to make amends for his mistake. He later helped Genk win the 2012–13 Belgian Cup after starting the whole game to beat Cercle Brugge. At the end of the 2012–13 season, Koulibaly went on to make 46 appearances and scoring once in all competitions.

The 2013–14 season saw Koulibaly began playing in the centre–back position, where he continued to form a partnership with Kara Mbodji. He then scored two goals in two matches between 6 October 2013 and 19 October 2013. Koulibaly started in every match since the start of the season until he suffered a knee injury during a 2–0 loss against Lokeren on 8 December 2013. A month later on 19 January 2014, Koulibaly returned to the starting lineup from injury, starting the whole game, in a 1–0 loss against Zulte Waregem. Koulibaly kept his place in the first team for the rest of the season. However, he missed the remaining three league matches of the season, due to his imminent transfer move to Napoli. Despite this, Koulibaly went on to make 46 appearances and scored two times in all competitions.

=== Napoli ===
==== 2014–15: Debut season ====
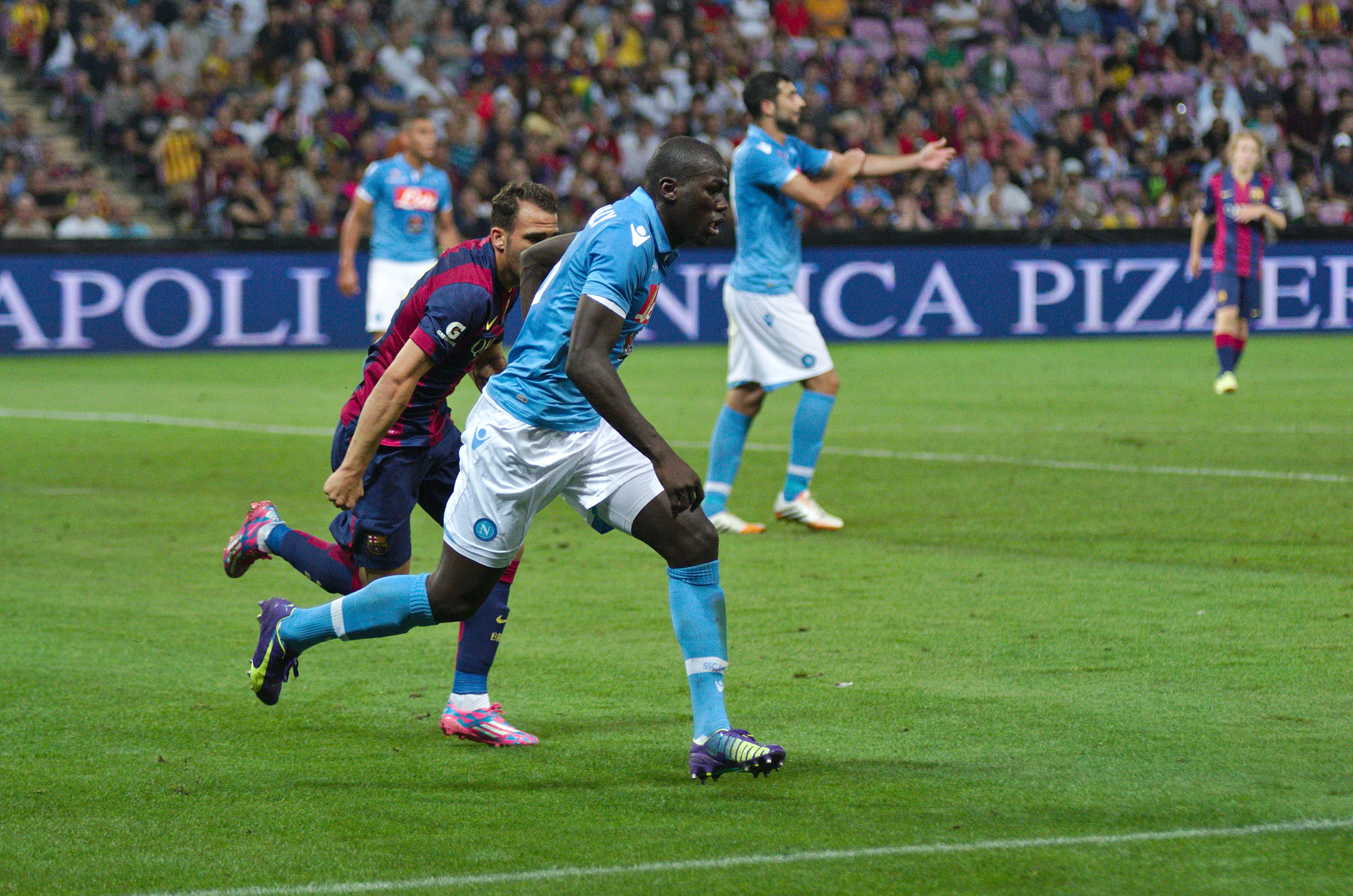
Koulibaly playing for Napoli in 2014

Koulibaly joined Serie A club Napoli on 2 July 2014 on a five-year contract, for a fee around £6.5 million. When the President Aurelio De Laurentiis met Koulibaly for the first time, he expected the player to be 1.92/1.93m tall, as he had read, and said he should have paid him less because he was smaller; Koulibaly replied that he would have delivered his value on the pitch.

He made his debut on 19 August in a UEFA Champions League play-off round qualifier, in which Napoli drew 1–1 with Athletic Bilbao. Napoli went on to lose the second leg 3–1, thus sending them out of the competition. Koulibaly made his Serie A debut in the opening game of the season against Genoa, playing the whole match as Napoli won 2–1. He scored his first goal for the side on 24 September in a 3–3 draw with Palermo. Koulibaly played in every match from the start of the season, before being sent off for a second bookable offence in a 1–1 draw against Sampdoria on 1 December 2014.

In the 2014 Supercoppa Italiana against Juventus in Doha, Qatar, on 22 December, Koulibaly scored the winning penalty in the shootout to secure Napoli victory. Towards the end of the 2014–15 season, Koulibaly found himself placed in and out of the starting eleven for the side, as manager Rafael Benítez preferred Raúl Albiol and Miguel Britos in the central defence positions. In his first season at Napoli, Koulibaly went on to make 39 appearances and scored one goal in all competitions.

==== 2015–16 season ====
Ahead of the 2015–16 season, Koulibaly was linked with a move to Premier League side Southampton, but he eventually stayed at the club. Despite this, Koulibaly became a regular starter for Napoli under coach Maurizio Sarri, and saw an improvement in his performances for the side in the number of matches.

During a 2–0 win over Lazio on 3 February 2016, Koulibaly was subjected to racist abuse from Lazio supporters, prompting referee Massimiliano Irrati to suspend the match temporally; Koulibaly later reflected on this as "the first time that he really experienced any racism in football". After the match, Lazio would go on to be sanctioned €50,000 by the league for these racist chants, and were ordered to play two home matches behind closed doors. In a follow-up match against Carpi, Napoli supporters wore masks of Koulibaly in support of him; he played a vital role during the game as he set up Gonzalo Higuaín to score the only goal of the match in a Napoli victory.

The matches against Lazio and Carpi saw Napoli keep two consecutive clean sheets for the second time during the season, having previously achieved this in matches between 20 and 23 September 2015. Koulibaly made 42 appearances in the 2015–16 season in all competitions.

==== 2016–2018 ====
In the 2016–17 season, Koulibaly continued to be a regular starter for Napoli under coach Maurizio Sarri and helped the side start the season well, earning four wins from their first six league matches. On 19 September 2016, he signed a five–year contract with the club, keeping him at Napoli until 2021. It was not until 15 October 2016 that Koulibaly scored his first goal of the season, in a 3–1 loss to Roma. Koulibaly continued to start every match of the season, until he sustained a knee injury during a 5–0 win over Cagliari on 11 December 2016, resulting in him being sidelined for a month. After spending two months away from Napoli's first team, due to both injury and international commitment, Koulibaly made his return to the starting lineup, playing the full 90 minutes, in a 2–0 win over Genoa on 10 February 2017. Koulibaly regained his first team place for the side towards the end of the 2016–17 season. He later scored his second goal of the season, in a 4–1 win over Fiorentina, on 20 May 2017. By the end of the 2016–17 season, Koulibaly had made 38 appearances and scored two times in all competitions.

In the 2017–18 season, Koulibaly played an integral role as Napoli won their first eight matches of the Serie A campaign. During this streak, he scored two goals for the side, netting against Lazio and Cagliari on 20 September and 1 October 2017 respectively. Koulibaly then helped Napoli go on a ten match winning streak in the league between 16 December 2017 and 26 February 2018. During this streak, he scored two goals for the side against Torino and Hellas Verona on 16 December 2017 and 6 January 2018 respectively. Napoli continued to closely challenge for the 2017–18 Serie A title. On 22 April 2018, Koulibaly scored a 90th-minute header against league leaders Juventus at the Allianz Stadium to seal a 1–0 win for the visitors and move Napoli within one point of Juventus with four games remaining. However, in their next match against Fiorentina, Koulibaly was sent off within ten minutes for a rash foul, as Napoli lost 3–0. Napoli would go on to achieve a club record 91 points, but finished the season 4 points behind league winners Juventus. By the end of the 2017–18 season, Koulibaly had made 45 appearances and scored five times in all competitions, his highest-scoring season for the club.

==== 2018–19 season ====
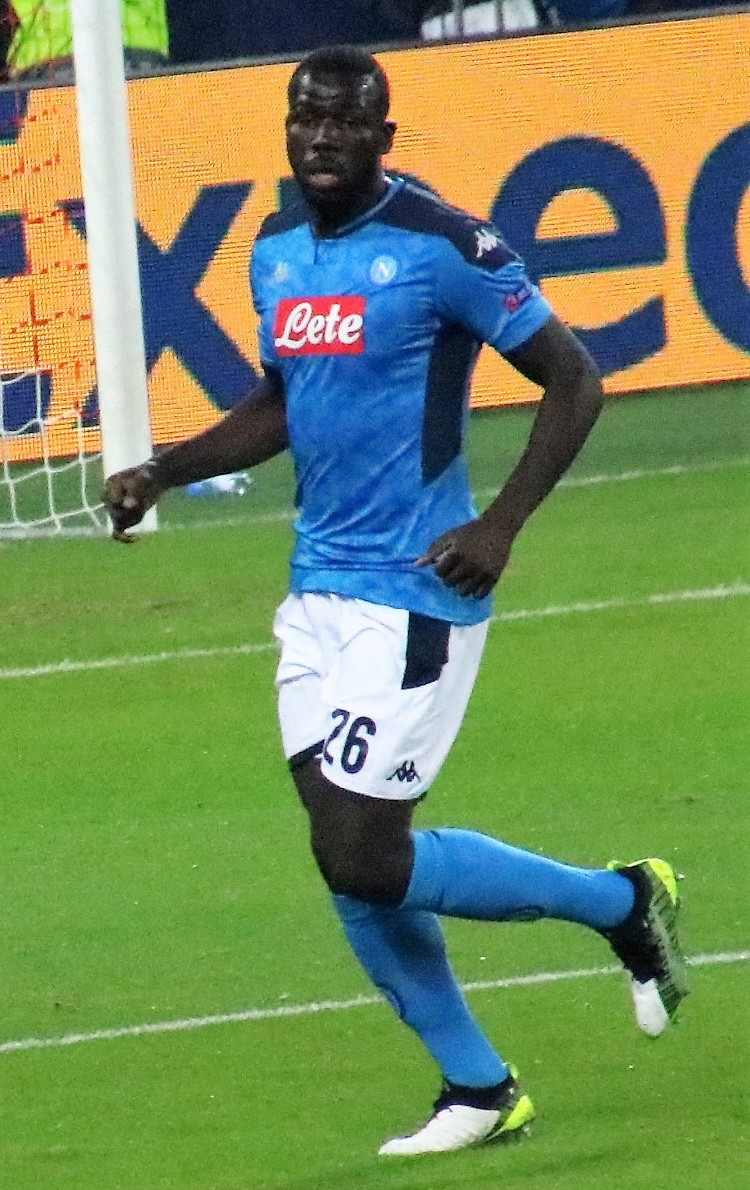
Koulibaly playing for Napoli in 2019

At the start of the 2018–19 season, Koulibaly signed a contract extension with Napoli, keeping him at the club until 2023. He continued to be a regular starter for Napoli under coach Carlo Ancelotti and spoke positively about playing under him. Koulibaly helped the side win thirteen matches in the league to stay near the higher positions and challenge for the league title once again. He then captained Napoli for the first time in his career, helping the side beat Cagliari 1–0 on 16 December 2018. However, on 26 December 2018, Koulibaly received two yellow cards in quick succession for a foul and for sarcastically applauding the referee and was sent off, as Napoli lost 1–0 to Inter Milan at the San Siro. According to Ancelotti, Koulibaly was the target of racist chants from the Inter fans and his team asked for the match to be suspended three times. Posting on social media after the match, Koulibaly wrote: "I'm sorry about the defeat and especially to have let my brothers down. But I'm proud of the colour of my skin. To be French, Senegalese, Neapolitan, and a man." Inter would go on to be sanctioned by the league for these racist chants, and was ordered to play two home matches behind closed doors.

After serving a two match suspension, Koulibaly returned to the starting lineup, playing the whole game and keeping a clean sheet, in a 2–0 win over Sassuolo in the round of 16 of the Coppa Italia. He helped the side keep five consecutive clean sheets in the league between 26 January and 24 February 2019, including matches against Milan, Sampdoria and Parma. On 12 April 2019, Koulibaly was involved in another racial incident, after reportedly suffering racist abuse from an Arsenal fan during a Europa League match between the two teams. Two days later on 14 April 2019, he scored twice for the side, in a 3–1 win over Chievo. Napoli once again finished the season as runners-up to Juventus, with Koulibaly earning the inaugural Serie A Best Defender award for the season. By the end of the 2018–19 season, he had made 48 appearances and scored two goals in all competitions.

==== 2019–22: Coppa Italia ====
On 17 June 2020, Koulibaly started in the Coppa Italia final against Juventus; Napoli won the match 4–2 on penalties after a goalless draw. Koulibaly has on a number of occasions talked about his desire to retire at Napoli, and that a departure would only occur due to an economic decision made by the club.

In September 2021, he was named as Serie A Player of the Month. On 24 November 2021, he played his 300th match with Napoli in a 2–1 defeat against Spartak Moscow in the Europa League.

=== Chelsea ===
On 16 July 2022, Koulibaly signed for Premier League club Chelsea on a four-year contract for a fee reported to be in the region of £33 million. On 6 August, he made his Chelsea debut in a 1–0 away league win over Everton. Koulibaly scored his first Chelsea goal in his home debut on 14 August, flashing home a powerful volley in a 2–2 home league draw against London rivals Tottenham Hotspur.

=== Al-Hilal ===
On 25 June 2023, it was announced that Koulibaly signed for Saudi Pro League club Al-Hilal for a fee of around £20 million. In his debut season, he won the league title along with the King's Cup and the Saudi Super Cup with his club.

== International career ==
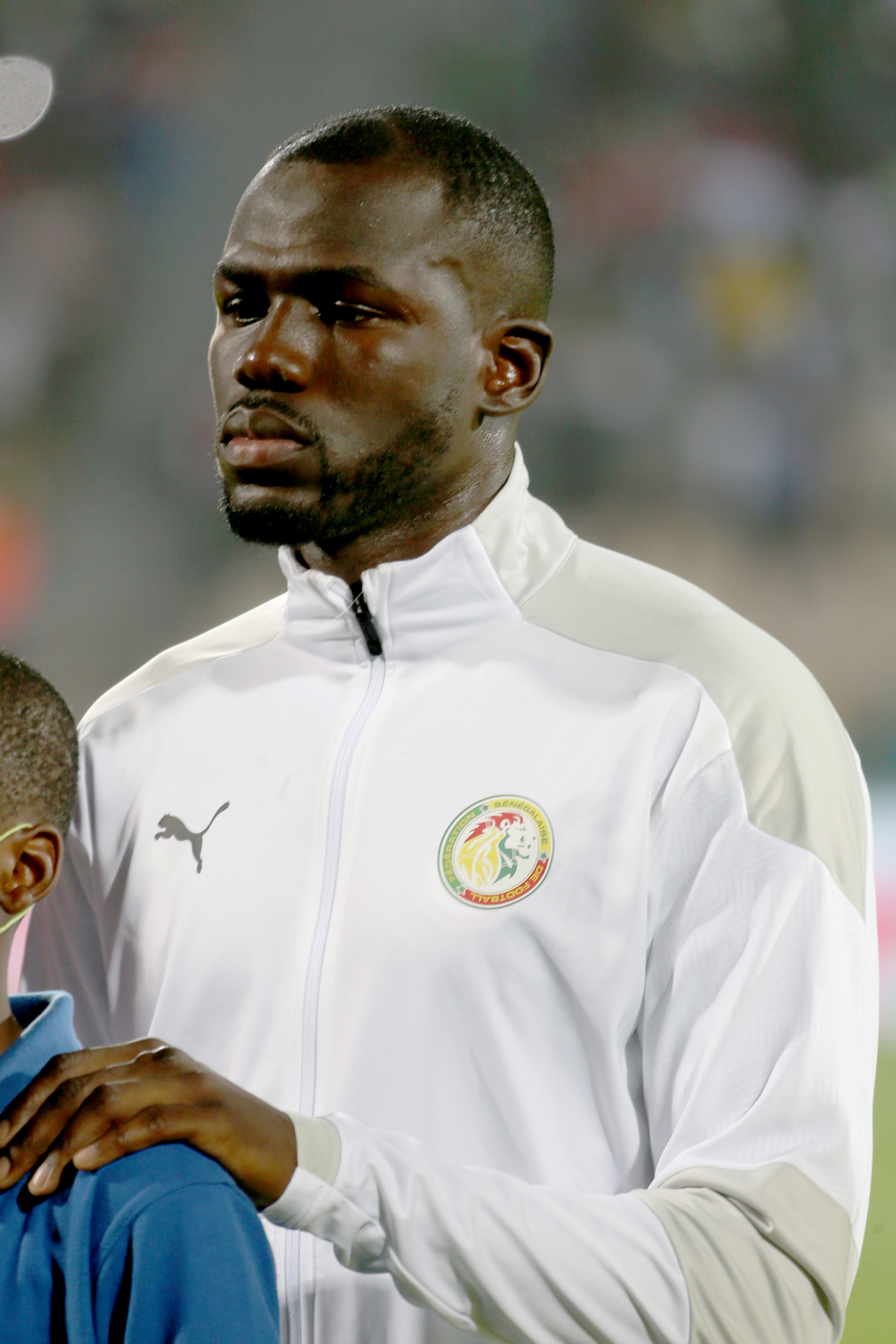
Koulibaly with Senegal at the 2021 Africa Cup of Nations

Koulibaly was born and raised in France by Senegalese parents, and was therefore eligible for both nations. He played for the French under-20 team starting in 2011 and played six times during the FIFA U-20 World Cup in Colombia. However, in early September 2015, Koulibaly changed federations and joined the Senegal national football team, despite the interest to call him for Les Bleus from Didier Deschamps. He later explained his decision, saying: "I don't have any regrets because I want to write the story of the future of Senegal football and I hope I'll be able to do that."

Koulibaly made his debut on 5 September 2015 in an AFCON qualifier against Namibia in a 2–0 victory. He was a member of the Senegal squad that took part at the 2017 Africa Cup of Nations.

In May 2018, he was named in Senegal's 23-man squad for the 2018 FIFA World Cup in Russia. Koulibaly played all three matches, as Senegal were knocked out in the group stage of the tournament after becoming the first team in FIFA World Cup history to be eliminated due to fair play tiebreaker rules.

In December 2021, he was named in Senegal's 23-man squad for the 2021 Africa Cup of Nations in Cameroon. As captain, he became the first Senegalese to lift the trophy, following a victory in the final against Egypt, in which he scored the first penalty shootout in a 4–2 win after a goalless draw.

Koulibaly was named in Senegal's 23-man squad for the 2022 FIFA World Cup in Qatar. He scored his first international goal on 29 November in the 70th minute of Senegal's 2–1 win over Ecuador in their final match of the group stage. This goal proved decisive in securing the win for Senegal, which ensured that the team progressed to the round of 16.

In December 2023, he was named in Senegal's squad for the postponed 2023 Africa Cup of Nations held in the Ivory Coast. On 27 December 2025, he made his 100th international appearance in a 1–1 draw against DR Congo during the 2025 Africa Cup of Nations. He ultimately missed the final match as Senegal defeated host nation Morocco 1–0 after extra time. The title would then be revoked by AFCON (Africa Cup of Nations) and FIFA on 17 March 2026 due to Senegal’s walk-off in added time.

On 21 May 2026, Koulibaly was officially selected by Senegal's coach Pape Thiaw from his list of 28 players to participate in the 2026 FIFA World Cup.

== Style of play ==
A large, aggressive, quick and physically strong yet elegant player, Koulibaly is recognised for his aerial prowess, anticipation, positioning, tackling, character, technique and passing ability as a defender. He has also been praised by pundits for his overall solidity as a player and his ability to make interceptions; however, he has also drawn criticism for giving away too many fouls. Due to his versatility, he can play both in his usual role as a central defender, or as a full-back on either the right or left flank, in both a three or four-man defence; he has even been deployed as a defensive midfielder. During his time at Napoli, his ability to play the ball out from the back saw him function as a ball-playing centre-back in manager Maurizio Sarri's attacking, possession based-system.

== Personal life ==
Koulibaly is a citizen of both Senegal and France. In May 2019, it was announced that Koulibaly was named as an honorary citizen of Naples. In April 2015, he was previously named as an honorary citizen of Saint-Dié-des-Vosges. He is so popular in Naples that an entrepreneur created a pizza after him and Koulibaly himself has spoken of his fondness for the city.

He is a Muslim and stated that his name derives from the Quran. In addition to French and Pulaar, Koulibaly speaks English and Italian.

Throughout his time at Napoli, Koulibaly spoke out about racism in Italian football. In October 2019, Koulibaly called on the Italian football authorities to tackle racism by giving offenders a lifetime ban from entering the stadium. He had previously criticised the Italian football authorities for their lack of effort to tackle racism in January of that year.

He has been involved in several activities to help poor people both in Naples and his motherland: in June 2021, while vacationing in Senegal, Koulibaly collaborated with local organizations to assist underprivileged children and coordinated the arrival of a ship carrying sanitary tools and essential needs from the port of Naples.

Koulibaly was appointed a Grand Officer of the National Order of the Lion by President of Senegal Macky Sall following the nation's victory at the 2021 Africa Cup of Nations.

== Career statistics ==
=== Club ===
As of match played 19 October 2026

Appearances and goals by club, season and competition
Club	Season	League			National cup (Note: Includes Coupe de France, Belgian Cup, Coppa Italia, FA Cup, King's Cup)		League cup (Note: Includes EFL Cup)		Continental		Other		Total	
Club	Season	Division	Apps	Goals	Apps	Goals	Apps	Goals	Apps	Goals	Apps	Goals	Apps	Goals
Metz II	2009–10	CFA 2	16	0	—		—		—		—		16	0
Metz II	2010–11	CFA	15	2	—		—		—		—		15	2
Metz II	Total		31	2	—		—		—		—		31	2
Metz	2010–11	Ligue 2	19	1	2	0	0	0	—		—		21	1
Metz	2011–12	Ligue 2	22	0	3	0	0	0	—		—		25	0
Metz	Total		41	1	5	0	0	0	—		—		46	1
Genk	2012–13	Belgian Pro League	31	1	6	0	—		9 (Note: Appearances in UEFA Europa League)	0	—		46	1
Genk	2013–14	Belgian Pro League	33	2	3	0	—		9	0	1 (Note: Appearance in Belgian Super Cup)	0	46	2
Genk	Total		64	3	9	0	—		18	0	1	0	92	3
Napoli	2014–15	Serie A	27	1	2	0	—		9 (Note: Two appearances in UEFA Champions League, seven appearances in UEFA Europa League)	0	1 (Note: Appearance in Supercoppa Italiana)	0	39	1
Napoli	2015–16	Serie A	33	0	2	0	—		7	0	—		42	0
Napoli	2016–17	Serie A	28	2	2	0	—		8 (Note: Appearances in UEFA Champions League)	0	—		38	2
Napoli	2017–18	Serie A	35	5	2	0	—		8 (Note: Seven appearances in UEFA Champions League, one appearance in UEFA Europa League)	0	—		45	5
Napoli	2018–19	Serie A	35	2	2	0	—		11 (Note: Six appearances in UEFA Champions League, five appearances in UEFA Europa League)	0	—		48	2
Napoli	2019–20	Serie A	25	0	2	0	—		7	0	—		34	0
Napoli	2020–21	Serie A	26	0	3	1	—		7	0	1	0	37	1
Napoli	2021–22	Serie A	27	3	0	0	—		7	0	—		34	3
Napoli	Total		236	13	15	1	—		64	0	2	0	317	14
Chelsea	2022–23	Premier League	23	2	1	0	1	0	7	0	—		32	2
Al-Hilal	2023–24	Saudi Pro League	30	2	4	0	—		8 (Note: Appearances in AFC Champions League)	0	8 (Note: Six appearances in Arab Club Champions Cup, two appearances in Saudi Super Cup)	0	50	2
Al-Hilal	2024–25	Saudi Pro League	30	2	2	0	—		12	0	6 (Note: One appearance in Saudi Super Cup, five appearances and one goal in FIFA Club World Cup)	1	50	3
Al-Hilal	2025–26	Saudi Pro League	18	1	4	0	—		4	1	—		26	2
Al-Hilal	2026–27	Saudi Pro League	9	0	1	0	—		2	0	—		12	0
Al-Hilal	Total		87	5	11	0	—		26	1	14	1	138	7
Career total			482	26	41	1	1	0	115	1	17	1	656	29

=== International ===
As of match played 12 November 2026

Appearances and goals by national team and year
National team	Year	Apps	Goals
Senegal	2015	5	0
Senegal	2016	7	0
Senegal	2017	10	0
Senegal	2018	9	0
Senegal	2019	11	0
Senegal	2020	2	0
Senegal	2021	9	0
Senegal	2022	15	1
Senegal	2023	7	0
Senegal	2024	14	0
Senegal	2025	12	1
Senegal	2026	7	0
Total		108	2

As of match played 5 September 2025
Senegal score listed first, score column indicates score after each Koulibaly goal

List of international goals scored by Kalidou Koulibaly
No.	Date	Venue	Cap	Opponent	Score	Result	Competition	Ref.
1	29 November 2022	Khalifa International Stadium, Al Rayyan, Qatar	67	Ecuador	2–1	2–1	2022 FIFA World Cup	
2	5 September 2025	Diamniadio Olympic Stadium, Diamniadio, Senegal	93	Sudan	1–0	2–0	2026 FIFA World Cup qualification	

== Honours ==
Genk

- Belgian Cup: 2012–13

Napoli

- Coppa Italia: 2019–20
- Supercoppa Italiana: 2014

Al-Hilal

- Saudi Pro League: 2023–24
- King's Cup: 2023–24, 2025–26
- Saudi Super Cup: 2023, 2024

Senegal

- Africa Cup of Nations: 2021

Individual

- CAF Team of the Year: 2018, 2019, 2023, 2024
- Serie A Team of the Year: 2015–16, 2016–17, 2017–18, 2018–19
- Golden Lion (Senegal Player of the Year): 2017, 2018
- Serie A Best Defender: 2018–19
- Serie A Player of the Month: September 2021
- Africa Cup of Nations Team of the Tournament: 2019
- IFFHS CAF Men Team of The Year: 2020
- IFFHS CAF Men's Team of the Decade: 2011–2020
- Saudi Pro League Team of the Season: 2023–24

Orders

- Grand Officer of the National Order of the Lion: 2022

== See also ==
- List of men's footballers with 100 or more international caps
