= 2025 Supercoppa Italiana final (December) =

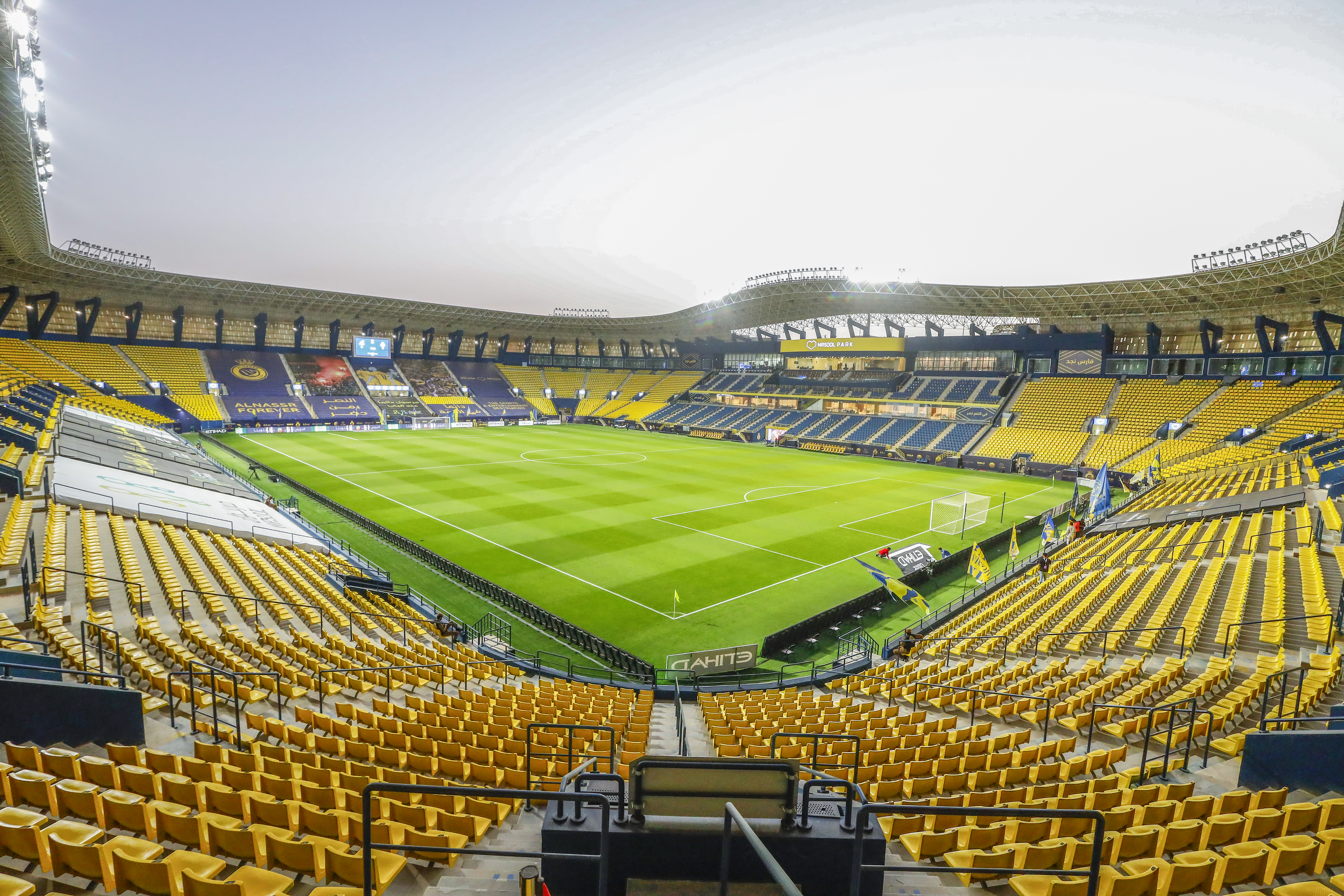
- The King Saud University Stadium in Riyadh hosted the final.
- Event: 2025–26 Supercoppa Italiana
| Napoli | Bologna |
| 2 | 0 |
- Date: 22 December 2025
- Venue: King Saud University Stadium, Riyadh
- Man of the Match: David Neres (Napoli)
- Referee: Andrea Colombo
- Attendance: 17,869

The 2025–26 Supercoppa Italiana final was a football match to decide the winners of the 2025–26 Supercoppa Italiana, the Italian football super cup. It was the 38th edition of the annual tournament, which was also the third edition to feature a final match in the new four-team format. The match was played on 22 December 2025 at the King Saud University Stadium in Riyadh, Saudi Arabia. It featured the 2024–25 Serie A champions, Napoli, and the 2024–25 Coppa Italia winners, Bologna.

Napoli won the match 2–0 for their third Supercoppa Italiana title.

== Teams ==
| Team | Qualification for tournament | Previous finals appearances (bold indicates winners) |
|---|---|---|
| Napoli | 2024–25 Serie A champions | 5 (**1990**, 2012, **2014**, 2020, 2023) |
| Bologna | 2024–25 Coppa Italia winners | None |

== Route to the final ==
| Napoli | | Round | Bologna | |
|---|---|---|---|---|
| Opponent | Result | 2025–26 Supercoppa Italiana | Opponent | Result |
| AC Milan | 2–0 | Semi-finals | Inter Milan | 1–1 (3–2 p) |

== Match ==
=== Details ===
22 December 2025
22:00 AST

| Napoli | 2–0 | Bologna |
|---|---|---|
| Neres 39', 57' | Report |

King Saud University Stadium, Riyadh
Attendance: 17,869
Referee: Andrea Colombo

| **Napoli** | **Bologna** |

| GK | 32 | (Serbia) Vanja Milinković-Savić |
| CB | 22 | (Italy) Giovanni Di Lorenzo (c) |
| CB | 13 | (Kosovo) Amir Rrahmani |
| CB | 5 | (Brazil) Juan Jesus | | (substituted off) 83' |
| RM | 21 | (Italy) Matteo Politano | (yellow card) 79' |
| CM | 68 | (Slovakia) Stanislav Lobotka |
| CM | 8 | (Scotland) Scott McTominay |
| LM | 37 | (Italy) Leonardo Spinazzola | | (substituted off) 68' |
| RW | 7 | (Brazil) David Neres | | (substituted off) 78' |
| LW | 20 | (North Macedonia) Eljif Elmas | | (substituted off) 68' |
| CF | 19 | (Denmark) Rasmus Højlund |
Substitutes:
| GK | 14 | (Italy) Nikita Contini |
| GK | 25 | (Italy) Mathias Ferrante |
| DF | 3 | (Spain) Miguel Gutiérrez | | (substituted on) 68' |
| DF | 4 | (Italy) Alessandro Buongiorno | | (substituted on) 83' |
| DF | 17 | (Uruguay) Mathías Olivera |
| DF | 30 | (Italy) Pasquale Mazzocchi | | (substituted on) 78' |
| DF | 31 | (Netherlands) Sam Beukema |
| DF | 35 | (Italy) Luca Marianucci |
| MF | 98 | (Italy) Emmanuele De Chiara |
| FW | 9 | (Belgium) Romelu Lukaku |
| FW | 26 | (Italy) Antonio Vergara |
| FW | 27 | (Italy) Lorenzo Lucca |
| FW | 69 | (Italy) Giuseppe Ambrosino |
| FW | 70 | (Netherlands) Noa Lang | | (substituted on) 68' |
| FW | 96 | (Argentina) Francisco Baridó |
Manager:
| (Italy) Antonio Conte | | | (yellow card) 26' |

| GK | 13 | (Italy) Federico Ravaglia |
| RB | 2 | (Sweden) Emil Holm | (yellow card) 77' |
| CB | 14 | (Norway) Torbjørn Heggem | (yellow card) 44' |
| CB | 26 | (Colombia) Jhon Lucumí |
| LB | 33 | (Spain) Juan Miranda |
| CM | 19 | (Scotland) Lewis Ferguson (c) | | (substituted off) 68' |
| CM | 4 | (Italy) Tommaso Pobega |
| RW | 7 | (Italy) Riccardo Orsolini | | (substituted off) 80' |
| AM | 21 | (Denmark) Jens Odgaard | | (substituted off) 46' |
| LW | 28 | (Italy) Nicolò Cambiaghi | (yellow card) 50' | (substituted off) 68' |
| CF | 9 | (Argentina) Santiago Castro | | (substituted off) 80' |
Substitutes:
| GK | 1 | (Poland) Łukasz Skorupski |
| GK | 25 | (Italy) Massimo Pessina |
| GK | 82 | (Italy) Matteo Franceschelli |
| DF | 15 | (Montenegro) Bodin Tomašević |
| DF | 20 | (Italy) Nadir Zortea |
| DF | 22 | (Greece) Charalampos Lykogiannis |
| DF | 29 | (Italy) Lorenzo De Silvestri |
| DF | 41 | (Czech Republic) Martin Vitík |
| MF | 6 | (Croatia) Nikola Moro | | (substituted on) 46' |
| MF | 77 | (Ghana) Ibrahim Sulemana |
| MF | 80 | (Italy) Giovanni Fabbian |
| FW | 11 | (England) Jonathan Rowe | | (substituted on) 68' |
| FW | 17 | (Italy) Ciro Immobile | | (substituted on) 80' |
| FW | 24 | (Netherlands) Thijs Dallinga | | (substituted on) 68' |
| FW | 30 | (Argentina) Benjamín Domínguez | | (substituted on) 80' |
Manager:
(Italy) Vincenzo Italiano

Man of the Match:
David Neres (Napoli)

Assistant referees:
Alessio Berti
Valerio Vecchi
Fourth official:
Federico La Penna
Video assistant referee:
Marco Di Bello
Assistant video assistant referee:
Ivano Pezzuto

**Match rules**

- 90 minutes.
- Penalty shoot-out if scores level.
- Maximum of fifteen named substitutes.
- Maximum of five substitutions. (Note: Each team was given only three opportunities to make substitutions, excluding substitutions made at half-time.)

== See also ==
- 2025–26 Serie A
- 2025–26 Coppa Italia
- 2025–26 SSC Napoli season
- 2025–26 Bologna FC 1909 season
