= 2025 Supercoppa Italiana final =

Two Supercoppa Italiana finals were played in 2025:

- 2025 Supercoppa Italiana final (January), final of the 2024–25 Supercoppa Italiana, Inter Milan 2–3 AC Milan
- 2025 Supercoppa Italiana final (December), final of the 2025–26 Supercoppa Italiana, Napoli 2–0 Bologna
