= 2025–26 SSC Napoli season =

Napoli
2025–26 season
- Owner: Filmauro
- President: Aurelio De Laurentiis
- Head coach: Antonio Conte
- Stadium: Stadio Diego Armando Maradona
- Serie A: 2nd
- Coppa Italia: Quarter-finals
- Supercoppa Italiana: Winners
- UEFA Champions League: League phase
- Top goalscorer: League: Rasmus Højlund (12); All: Rasmus Højlund (16)
- Highest home attendance: 54,200 vs Internazionale; 25 October 2025 (Serie A)
- Lowest home attendance: 32,019 vs Qarabağ; 25 November 2025 (UEFA Champions League)
- Average home league attendance: 47,632
- Biggest win: 4–0 vs Cremonese; 24 April 2026 (Serie A)
- Biggest defeat: 2–6 vs PSV Eindhoven; 21 October 2025 (UEFA Champions League)
| Home colours | Away colours | Third colours |

The 2025–26 season was the 100th season in the history of SSC Napoli, and the club's 19th consecutive season in the Serie A. In addition to the domestic league, the club participated in the Coppa Italia, the Supercoppa Italiana and the UEFA Champions League.

== Players ==
=== First-team squad ===
As of 2 February 2026

Note: Flags indicate national team as defined under FIFA eligibility rules; some limited exceptions apply. Players may hold more than one non-FIFA nationality.

| No. | Pos. | Nation | Player |
|---|---|---|---|
| 1 | GK | ITA | Alex Meret |
| 3 | DF | ESP | Miguel Gutiérrez |
| 4 | DF | ITA | Alessandro Buongiorno |
| 5 | DF | BRA | Juan Jesus |
| 6 | MF | SCO | Billy Gilmour |
| 7 | FW | BRA | David Neres |
| 8 | MF | SCO | Scott McTominay |
| 9 | FW | BEL | Romelu Lukaku |
| 11 | MF | BEL | Kevin De Bruyne |
| 13 | DF | KOS | Amir Rrahmani |
| 14 | GK | ITA | Nikita Contini |
| 17 | DF | URU | Mathías Olivera |
| 19 | FW | DEN | Rasmus Højlund (on loan from Manchester United) |

| No. | Pos. | Nation | Player |
|---|---|---|---|
| 20 | MF | MKD | Eljif Elmas (on loan from RB Leipzig) |
| 21 | FW | ITA | Matteo Politano |
| 22 | DF | ITA | Giovanni Di Lorenzo (captain) |
| 23 | FW | BRA | Giovane |
| 26 | MF | ITA | Antonio Vergara |
| 27 | FW | BRA | Alisson Santos (on loan from Sporting CP) |
| 30 | DF | ITA | Pasquale Mazzocchi |
| 31 | DF | NED | Sam Beukema |
| 32 | GK | SRB | Vanja Milinković-Savić (on loan from Torino) |
| 37 | DF | ITA | Leonardo Spinazzola |
| 68 | MF | SVK | Stanislav Lobotka |
| 99 | MF | CMR | André-Frank Zambo Anguissa |

=== Out on loan ===
As of 2 February 2026

Note: Flags indicate national team as defined under FIFA eligibility rules; some limited exceptions apply. Players may hold more than one non-FIFA nationality.

| No. | Pos. | Nation | Player |
|---|---|---|---|
| — | GK | ITA | Claudio Turi (at Team Altamura until 30 June 2026) |
| — | DF | ITA | Luigi D'Avino (at Giugliano until 30 June 2026) |
| — | DF | ITA | Luca Marianucci (at Torino until 30 June 2026) |
| — | DF | ESP | Rafa Marín (at Villarreal until 30 June 2026) |
| — | DF | ITA | Nosa Edward Obaretin (at Empoli until 30 June 2026) |
| — | DF | ITA | Alessandro Zanoli (at Udinese until 30 June 2026) |
| — | MF | SWE | Jens Cajuste (at Ipswich Town until 30 June 2026) |
| — | MF | ITA | Michael Folorunsho (at Cagliari until 30 June 2026) |
| — | MF | ITA | Gennaro Iaccarino (at Arezzo until 30 June 2026) |
| — | MF | ITA | Lorenzo Russo (at Guidonia Montecelio until 30 June 2026) |
| — | MF | MLI | Coli Saco (at Casertana until 30 June 2026) |
| — | FW | ITA | Giuseppe Ambrosino (at Modena until 30 June 2026) |

| No. | Pos. | Nation | Player |
|---|---|---|---|
| — | FW | MAR | Walid Cheddira (at Lecce until 30 June 2026) |
| — | FW | ITA | Antonio Cioffi (at Latina until 30 June 2026) |
| — | FW | ITA | Luis Hasa (at Carrarese until 30 June 2026) |
| — | FW | NED | Noa Lang (at Galatasaray until 30 June 2026) |
| — | FW | DEN | Jesper Lindstrøm (at VfL Wolfsburg until 30 June 2026) |
| — | FW | ITA | Lorenzo Lucca (at Nottingham Forest until 30 June 2026) |
| — | FW | BEL | Cyril Ngonge (at Espanyol until 30 June 2026) |
| — | FW | ITA | Emanuele Rao (at Bari until 30 June 2026) |
| — | FW | ITA | Lorenzo Sgarbi (at Pescara until 30 June 2026) |
| — | FW | ARG | Giovanni Simeone (at Torino until 30 June 2026) |
| — | FW | ITA | Gianluca Vigliotti (at Pineto until 30 June 2026) |
| — | FW | ITA | Alessio Zerbin (at Cremonese until 30 June 2026) |

== Transfers ==
=== Summer window ===
==== In ====
| Date | Pos. | Player | From | Fee | Notes | Ref. |
|---|---|---|---|---|---|---|
| 12 June 2025 | MF | (Belgium) Kevin De Bruyne | (England) Manchester City | Free | End of contract | |
| 13 June 2025 | DF | (Italy) Luca Marianucci | (Italy) Empoli | €9,000,000 | | |
| 16 July 2025 | GK | (Italy) Mathias Ferrante | (Italy) NovaRomentin | €100,000 | Joined Primavera squad | |
| 17 July 2025 | FW | (Netherlands) Noa Lang | (Netherlands) PSV Eindhoven | €25,000,000 | | |
| 20 July 2025 | DF | (Netherlands) Sam Beukema | (Italy) Bologna | €30,000,000 | | |
| 20 July 2025 | FW | (Italy) Manuel Nardozi | (Italy) Roma | Undisclosed | Joined Primavera squad | |
| 19 August 2025 | DF | (Spain) Miguel Gutiérrez | (Spain) Girona | €20,000,000 | | |
| 1 September 2025 | MF | (Argentina) Francisco Baridó | (Italy) Juventus | Undisclosed | Joined Primavera squad | |

==== Loans in ====
| Date | Pos. | Player | From | Fee | Notes | Ref. |
|---|---|---|---|---|---|---|
| 18 July 2025 | FW | (Italy) Lorenzo Lucca | (Italy) Udinese | €9,000,000 | With obligation to buy | |
| 26 July 2025 | GK | (Serbia) Vanja Milinković-Savić | (Italy) Torino | €15,000,000 | With conditional obligation to buy | |
| 1 September 2025 | MF | (North Macedonia) Eljif Elmas | (Germany) RB Leipzig | €2,000,000 | With option to buy | |
| 1 September 2025 | FW | (Denmark) Rasmus Højlund | (England) Manchester United | €6,000,000 | With conditional obligation to buy | |

==== Out ====
| Date | Pos. | Player | To | Fee | Notes | Ref. |
|---|---|---|---|---|---|---|
| 9 June 2025 | DF | (Brazil) Natan | (Spain) Real Betis | €9,000,000 | From loan to definitive purchase | |
| 24 June 2025 | GK | (Italy) Elia Caprile | (Italy) Cagliari | €8,000,000 | From loan to definitive purchase | |
| 30 June 2025 | GK | (Italy) Simone Scuffet | (Italy) Cagliari | End of loan | | |
| 30 June 2025 | MF | (Denmark) Philip Billing | (England) Bournemouth | End of loan | Option to buy not exercised | |
| 30 June 2025 | FW | (Switzerland) Noah Okafor | (Italy) Milan | End of loan | Option to buy not exercised | |
| 1 July 2025 | MF | (Italy) Gianluca Gaetano | (Italy) Cagliari | €6,000,000 | From loan to definitive purchase | |
| 1 July 2025 | MF | (Italy) Francesco Mezzoni | (Italy) Virtus Entella | Free | After return from loan | |
| 1 July 2025 | MF | (Italy) Francesco Gioielli | (Italy) Afragolese | Free | From Primavera squad | |
| 17 July 2025 | FW | (Italy) Alessandro Spavone | (Italy) Guidonia | Free | From Primavera squad | |
| 18 July 2025 | DF | (Italy) Christian Di Martino | (Italy) Nuova Igea Virtus | Free | From Primavera squad | |
| 18 July 2025 | FW | (Italy) Giuseppe D'Agostino | (Italy) Guidonia | Free | From Primavera squad | |
| 25 July 2025 | MF | (Italy) Matteo Marchisano | (Italy) Avellino | Free | From Primavera squad | |
| 31 July 2025 | FW | (Nigeria) Victor Osimhen | (Turkey) Galatasaray | €75,000,000 | From loan to definitive purchase | |
| 11 August 2025 | FW | (Italy) Giacomo Raspadori | (Spain) Atlético Madrid | €22,000,000 | | |
| 11 September 2025 | MF | (Serbia) Matija Popović | (Russia) CSKA Moscow | Free | From Primavera squad | |

==== Loans out ====
| Date | Pos. | Player | To | Fee | Notes | Ref. |
|---|---|---|---|---|---|---|
| 3 July 2025 | DF | (Spain) Rafa Marín | (Spain) Villarreal | €1,000,000 | With option to buy | |
| 14 July 2025 | FW | (Italy) Pasquale Marranzino | (Italy) Sambenedettese | Free | From Primavera squad | |
| 17 July 2025 | FW | (Italy) Emanuele Rao | (Italy) Bari | Free | From Primavera squad | |
| 19 July 2025 | DF | (Italy) Luigi D'Avino | (Italy) Giugliano | Free | From Primavera squad | |
| 21 July 2025 | FW | (Italy) Gianluca Viglotti | (Italy) Pineto | Free | From Primavera squad | |
| 23 July 2025 | MF | (Italy) Gennaro Iaccarino | (Italy) Arezzo | Free | From Primavera squad | |
| 23 July 2025 | FW | (Denmark) Jesper Lindstrøm | (Germany) VfL Wolfsburg | €1,500,000 | After return from loan, with option to buy | |
| 24 July 2025 | FW | (Belgium) Cyril Ngonge | (Italy) Torino | €1,000,000 | With option to buy | |
| 24 July 2025 | MF | (Italy) Michael Folorunsho | (Italy) Cagliari | €500,000 | After return from loan, with option to buy | |
| 29 July 2025 | FW | (Italy) Alessio Zerbin | (Italy) Cremonese | €250,000 | After return from loan, with conditional obligation to buy | |
| 31 July 2025 | GK | (Italy) Claudio Turi | (Italy) Altamura | Free | From Primavera squad | |
| 7 August 2025 | FW | (Argentina) Giovanni Simeone | (Italy) Torino | €1,000,000 | After return from loan, with conditional obligation to buy | |
| 7 August 2025 | MF | (Sweden) Jens Cajuste | (England) Ipswich Town | €1,200,000 | After return from loan, with conditional obligation to buy | |
| 8 August 2025 | FW | (Italy) Lorenzo Sgarbi | (Italy) Pescara | Free | After return from loan | |
| 1 September 2025 | FW | (Italy) Alessandro Zanoli | (Italy) Udinese | Free | With obligation to buy | |
| 1 September 2025 | MF | (Italy) Luis Hasa | (Italy) Carrarese | Free | | |
| 1 September 2025 | FW | (Morocco) Walid Cheddira | (Italy) Sassuolo | Free | With option to buy | |

=== Winter window ===
==== In ====
| Date | Pos. | Player | From | Fee | Notes | Ref. |
|---|---|---|---|---|---|---|
| 22 January 2026 | FW | (Morocco) Walid Cheddira | (Italy) Sassuolo | Loan return | Loan terminated | |
| 23 January 2026 | FW | (Italy) Lorenzo Lucca | (Italy) Udinese | €26,000,000 | From loan to definitive purchase | |
| 24 January 2026 | FW | (Brazil) Giovane | (Italy) Hellas Verona | €20,000,000 | | |
| 31 January 2026 | FW | (Belgium) Cyril Ngonge | (Italy) Torino | Loan return | Loan terminated | |

==== Loans in ====
| Date | Pos. | Player | From | Fee | Notes | Ref. |
|---|---|---|---|---|---|---|
| 2 February 2026 | FW | (Brazil) Alisson Santos | (Portugal) Sporting CP | €3,000,000 | With option to buy | |

==== Out ====
| Date | Pos. | Player | To | Fee | Notes | Ref. |

==== Loans out ====
| Date | Pos. | Player | To | Fee | Notes | Ref. |
|---|---|---|---|---|---|---|
| 22 January 2026 | FW | (Morocco) Walid Cheddira | (Italy) Lecce | €200,000 | With option to buy | |
| 23 January 2026 | FW | (Italy) Lorenzo Lucca | (England) Nottingham Forest | €2,000,000 | With option to buy | |
| 23 January 2026 | FW | (Netherlands) Noa Lang | (Turkey) Galatasaray | €2,000,000 | With option to buy | |
| 31 January 2026 | FW | (Belgium) Cyril Ngonge | (Spain) Espanyol | €2,000,000 | With option to buy | |
| 31 January 2026 | DF | (Italy) Luca Marianucci | (Italy) Torino | Free | | |
| 2 February 2026 | FW | (Italy) Giuseppe Ambrosino | (Italy) Modena | Free | | |

== Friendlies ==
=== Pre-season ===
| 22 July 2025 Friendly | Napoli (Italy) | 0–2 | (Italy) Arezzo | Dimaro |
| 18:00 CEST (UTC+2) | | Report | Pattarello 38' (pen.); Djamanca 90' | Stadium: Stadio Comunale; Referee: Kevin Bonacina |

| 26 July 2025 Friendly | Napoli (Italy) | 2–1 | (Italy) Catanzaro | Dimaro |
| 18:00 CEST (UTC+2) | Raspadori 8'; Lucca 10' (pen.) | Report | Iemmello 49' | Stadium: Stadio Comunale; Referee: Daniele Perenzoni |

| 3 August 2025 Friendly | Napoli (Italy) | 1–2 | (France) Brest | Castel di Sangro |
| 19:00 CEST (UTC+2) | Lucca 63' | Report | Ajorque 30', 33'; Diaz (yellow card) 52' | Stadium: Stadio Teofilo Patini; Referee: Marco Guida (Italy) |

| 4 August 2025 Friendly | Napoli (Italy) | 1–1 | (Italy) Casertana | Castel di Sangro |
| 10:00 CEST (UTC+2) | Politano 44' | Report | Vano 35' | Stadium: Stadio Teofilo Patini; Referee: Marco Ventrone |

| 9 August 2025 Friendly | Napoli (Italy) | 3–2 | (Spain) Girona | Castel di Sangro |
| 19:00 CEST (UTC+2) | Di Lorenzo 4'; De Bruyne 15', 23' | Report | Stuani 33', 42' | Stadium: Stadio Teofilo Patini; Referee: Fabio Rosario Luongo (Italy) |

| 10 August 2025 Friendly | Napoli (Italy) | 4–0 | (Italy) Sorrento | Castel di Sangro |
| 10:00 CEST (UTC+2) | Lucca 12'; McTominay 22', (yellow card) 31'; Hasa 75'; Lukaku 85' | Report | | Stadium: Stadio Teofilo Patini; Referee: Maria Marotta |

| 14 August 2025 Friendly | Napoli (Italy) | 2–1 | (Greece) Olympiacos | Castel di Sangro |
| 18:00 CEST (UTC+2) | Politano 16'; De Bruyne (yellow card) 29'; Lucca 54' | Report | Hezze (yellow card) 27'; El Kaabi (yellow card) 37'; Chiquinho 90+1' | Stadium: Stadio Teofilo Patini; Referee: Federico Dionisi |

== Competitions ==
=== Overall record ===
| Competition | First match | Last match | Starting round | Final position | Record | | | | | | | |
| Competition | First match | Last match | Starting round | Final position | Pld | W | D | L | GF | GA | GD | Win % |
|---|---|---|---|---|---|---|---|---|---|---|---|---|
| Serie A | 23 August 2025 | 24 May 2026 | Matchday 1 | 2nd | 38 | 23 | 7 | 8 | 58 | 36 | +22 | 60.53 |
| Coppa Italia | 3 December 2025 | 10 February 2026 | Round of 16 | Quarter-finals | 2 | 0 | 2 | 0 | 2 | 2 | +0 | 0.00 |
| Supercoppa Italiana | 18 December 2025 | 22 December 2025 | Semi-finals | Winners | 2 | 2 | 0 | 0 | 4 | 0 | +4 | 100.00 |
| UEFA Champions League | 18 September 2025 | 28 January 2026 | League phase | League phase | 8 | 2 | 2 | 4 | 9 | 15 | −6 | 25.00 |
| Total | | | | | 50 | 27 | 11 | 12 | 73 | 53 | +20 | 54.00 |

Source: Soccerway

=== Serie A ===
==== League table ====
| Pos | Team | Pld | W | D | L | GF | GA | GD | Pts | Qualification or relegation |
|---|---|---|---|---|---|---|---|---|---|---|
| 1 | Inter Milan (C) | 38 | 27 | 6 | 5 | 89 | 35 | +54 | 87 | Qualification for the UEFA Champions League league phase |
| 2 | Napoli | 38 | 23 | 7 | 8 | 58 | 36 | +22 | 76 | Qualification for the UEFA Champions League league phase |
| 3 | Roma | 38 | 23 | 4 | 11 | 59 | 31 | +28 | 73 | Qualification for the UEFA Champions League league phase |
| 4 | Como | 38 | 20 | 11 | 7 | 65 | 29 | +36 | 71 | Qualification for the UEFA Champions League league phase |
| 5 | AC Milan | 38 | 20 | 10 | 8 | 53 | 35 | +18 | 70 | Qualification for the UEFA Europa League league phase (Note: Since the 2025–26 Coppa Italia winners, Inter Milan, qualified for the Champions League via league position, the Europa League spot awarded to the cup winners was passed to the sixth-placed team, and the Conference League spot was moved down one league position.) |

Source: Serie A
Rules for classification: 1) Points; 2) Tiebreaker for Champions team and third relegated team; 3) Head-to-head points; 4) Head-to-head goal difference; 5) Goal difference; 6) Goals scored; 7) Draw.
(Note: Head-to-head record is used only after all the matches between the teams in question have been played)
(C) Champions

==== Results summary ====
| Overall | | | | | | | | Home | | | | | | Away | | | | | |
| Pld | W | D | L | GF | GA | GD | Pts | W | D | L | GF | GA | GD | W | D | L | GF | GA | GD |
|---|---|---|---|---|---|---|---|---|---|---|---|---|---|---|---|---|---|---|---|
| 38 | 23 | 7 | 8 | 58 | 36 | +22 | 76 | 14 | 4 | 2 | 35 | 19 | +16 | 9 | 3 | 6 | 23 | 17 | +6 |

Source: Serie A

==== Results by round ====
| Round | 1 | 2 | 3 | 4 | 5 | 6 | 7 | 8 | 9 | 10 | 11 | 12 | 13 | 14 | 15 | 17 | 18 | 19 | 20 | 16^{1} | 21 | 22 | 23 | 24 | 25 | 26 | 27 | 28 | 29 | 30 | 31 | 32 | 33 | 34 | 35 | 36 | 37 | 38 |
|---|---|---|---|---|---|---|---|---|---|---|---|---|---|---|---|---|---|---|---|---|---|---|---|---|---|---|---|---|---|---|---|---|---|---|---|---|---|---|
| Ground | A | H | A | H | A | H | A | H | A | H | A | H | A | H | A | A | A | H | A | H | H | A | H | A | H | A | A | H | H | A | H | A | H | H | A | H | A | H |
| Result | W | W | W | W | L | W | L | W | W | D | L | W | W | W | L | W | W | D | D | D | W | L | W | W | D | L | W | W | W | W | W | D | L | W | D | L | W | W |
| Position | 4 | 2 | 1 | 1 | 2 | 1 | 3 | 1 | 1 | 1 | 4 | 3 | 2 | 2 | 3 | 3 | 3 | 3 | 4 | 3 | 3 | 4 | 3 | 3 | 3 | 3 | 3 | 3 | 3 | 3 | 2 | 2 | 3 | 2 | 2 | 2 | 2 | 2 |

Source: Serie A
A = Away; H = Home; W = Win; D = Draw; L = Loss

^{1} Matchday 16 (vs Parma) was postponed due to Napoli's participation in the Supercoppa Italiana.

==== Matches ====
The match schedule was released on 6 June 2025.

| 23 August 2025 1 | Sassuolo | 0–2 | Napoli | Reggio Emilia |
| 18:30 CEST (UTC+2) | Berardi (yellow card) 56'; Koné (yellow card) 67' (yellow-red card) 79' | Report | McTominay 17'; Lucca (yellow card) 46'; De Bruyne 57' | Stadium: Mapei Stadium – Città del Tricolore; Attendance: 19,106; Referee: Giovanni Ayroldi |

| 30 August 2025 2 | Napoli | 1–0 | Cagliari | Naples |
| 20:45 CEST (UTC+2) | De Bruyne (yellow card) 52'; Juan Jesus (yellow card) 67'; Zambo Anguissa 90+5' | Report | Zappa (yellow card) 5' | Stadium: Stadio Diego Armando Maradona; Attendance: 50,497; Referee: Kevin Bonacina |

| 13 September 2025 3 | Fiorentina | 1–3 | Napoli | Florence |
| 20:45 CET (UTC+1) | Ranieri 79' | Report | De Bruyne 6' (pen.); Højlund 14'; Beukema 51' | Stadium: Stadio Artemio Franchi; Attendance: 21,579; Referee: Luca Zufferli |

| 22 September 2025 4 | Napoli | 3–2 | Pisa | Naples |
| 20:45 CEST (UTC+2) | Gilmour 39'; Spinazzola (yellow card) 69', (goal) 73'; Lucca 82' | Report | Caracciolo (yellow card) 50'; Nzola 60' (pen.); Lusuardi (yellow card) 82'; Lorran 90' | Stadium: Stadio Diego Armando Maradona; Attendance: 50,312; Referee: Valerio Crezzini |

| 28 September 2025 5 | Milan | 2–1 | Napoli | Milan |
| 20:45 CEST (UTC+2) | Saelemaekers 3'; Pulisic 31'; Estupiñán (red card) 57'; Rabiot (yellow card) 90' | Report | De Bruyne 60' (pen.) | Stadium: San Siro; Attendance: 73,754; Referee: Daniele Chiffi |

| 5 October 2025 6 | Napoli | 2–1 | Genoa | Naples |
| 18:00 CEST (UTC+2) | Neres (yellow card) 55'; Zambo Anguissa 57'; Højlund 75' | Report | Marcandalli (yellow card) 28'; Ekhator 34'; Malinovskyi (yellow card) 38'; Otoa (yellow card) 63' | Stadium: Stadio Diego Armando Maradona; Attendance: 50,000; Referee: Federico La Penna |

| 18 October 2025 7 | Torino | 1–0 | Napoli | Turin |
| 18:00 CEST (UTC+2) | Simeone 32'; Israel (yellow card) 47' | Report | Juan Jesus (yellow card) 10'; Lang (yellow card) 90+4' | Stadium: Stadio Olimpico Grande Torino; Attendance: 26,802; Referee: Matteo Marcenaro |

| 25 October 2025 8 | Napoli | 3–1 | Internazionale | Naples |
| 18:00 CEST (UTC+2) | De Bruyne 33' (pen.); Di Lorenzo (yellow card) 43'; Gilmour (yellow card) 45+6'; McTominay 54'; Zambo Anguissa 67' | Report | Çalhanoğlu 59' (pen.); Bastoni (yellow card) 77' | Stadium: Stadio Diego Armando Maradona; Attendance: 54,200; Referee: Maurizio Mariani |

| 28 October 2025 9 | Lecce | 0–1 | Napoli | Lecce |
| 18:30 CET (UTC+1) | Camarda (penalty missed) 56'; Ramadani (yellow card) 62'; N'Dri (yellow card) 88' | Report | Olivera (yellow card) 26'; Zambo Anguissa 69' | Stadium: Stadio Via del mare Attendance: 25,569; Referee: Giuseppe Collu |

| 1 November 2025 10 | Napoli | 0–0 | Como | Naples |
| 18:00 CET (UTC+1) | Zambo Anguissa (yellow card) 21'; Politano (yellow card) 67'; Elmas (yellow card) 72' | Report | Perrone (yellow card) 16'; Morata (penalty missed) 26'; Smolčić (yellow card) 39' | Stadium: Stadio Diego Armando Maradona; Attendance: 52,000; Referee: Luca Zufferli |

| 9 November 2025 11 | Bologna | 2–0 | Napoli | Bologna |
| 15:00 CET (UTC+1) | Dallinga 50'; Lucumí 66'; Orsolini (yellow card) 74' | Report | Højlund (yellow card) 63'; Lang (yellow card) 71'; Neres (yellow card) 76' | Stadium: Stadio Renato Dall'Ara; Attendance: 33,174; Referee: Daniele Chiffi |

| 22 November 2025 12 | Napoli | 3–1 | Atalanta | Naples |
| 20:45 CET (UTC+1) | Neres 17', 38'; Lang 45'; Juan Jesus (yellow card) 75' | Report | Scamacca 52'; De Roon (yellow card) 59'; Zappacosta (yellow card) 62' | Stadium: Stadio Diego Armando Maradona; Attendance: 45,000; Referee: Marco Di Bello |

| 30 November 2025 13 | Roma | 0–1 | Napoli | Rome |
| 20:45 CET (UTC+1) | Cristante (yellow card) 54'; Baldanzi (yellow card) 73'; Ndicka (yellow card) 86'; El Shaarawy (yellow card) 90+3' | Report | Neres 36'; Lobotka (yellow card) 63'; Beukema (yellow card) 64'; Olivera (yellow card) 90+6' | Stadium: Stadio Olimpico; Attendance: 63,937; Referee: Davide Massa |

| 7 December 2025 14 | Napoli | 2–1 | Juventus | Naples |
| 20:45 CET (UTC+1) | Højlund 7', 78'; Buongiorno (yellow card) 33'; Beukema (yellow card) 70' | Report | Kalulu (yellow card) 52'; Yıldız 59' | Stadium: Stadio Diego Armando Maradona; Attendance: 53,000; Referee: Federico La Penna |

| 14 December 2025 15 | Udinese | 1–0 | Napoli | Udine |
| 15:00 CET (UTC+1) | Zaniolo (yellow card) 33'; Ekkelenkamp 73' | Report | | Stadium: Stadio Friuli; Attendance: 24,502; Referee: Simone Sozza |

| 28 December 2025 17 | Cremonese | 0–2 | Napoli | Cremona |
| 15:00 CET (UTC+1) | Barbieri (yellow card) 58'; Bonazzoli (yellow card) 84' | Report | Højlund 13', 45'; Juan Jesus (yellow card) 34'; McTominay (yellow card) 45+3' | Stadium: Stadio Giovanni Zini; Attendance: 14,236; Referee: Maurizio Mariani |

| 4 January 2026 18 | Lazio | 0–2 | Napoli | Rome |
| 12:30 CET (UTC+1) | Zaccagni (yellow card) 43'; Cataldi (yellow card) 64'; Noslin (yellow card) 69' (yellow-red card) 81'; Marušić (red card) 88' | Report | Spinazzola 13'; Rrahmani 32', (yellow card) 69'; Mazzocchi (red card) 88' | Stadium: Stadio Olimpico; Attendance: 45,000; Referee: Davide Massa |

| 7 January 2026 19 | Napoli | 2–2 | Hellas Verona | Naples |
| 18:30 CET (UTC+1) | McTominay 54'; Di Lorenzo 82' | Report | Frese 16'; Orban 27' (pen.), (yellow card) 28'; Bradarić (yellow card) 52'; Bella-Kotchap (yellow card) 75' | Stadium: Stadio Diego Armando Maradona; Attendance: 35,000; Referee: Matteo Marchetti |

| 11 January 2026 20 | Internazionale | 2–2 | Napoli | Milan |
| 20:45 CET (UTC+1) | Dimarco 9'; Çalhanoğlu 73' (pen.) | Report | McTominay 26', 81'; Juan Jesus (yellow card) 90+2' | Stadium: San Siro; Attendance: 72,567; Referee: Daniele Doveri |

| 14 January 2026 16 | Napoli | 0–0 | Parma | Naples |
| 18:30 CET (UTC+1) | Neres (yellow card) 87' | Report | Troilo (yellow card) 58'; Britschgi (yellow card) 67'; Rinaldi (yellow card) 81' | Stadium: Stadio Diego Armando Maradona; Attendance: 40,000; Referee: Michael Fabbri |
Note: The match was originally scheduled for 21 December 2025, but was postponed due to Napoli's participation in the Supercoppa Italiana.

| 17 January 2026 21 | Napoli | 1–0 | Sassuolo | Naples |
| 18:00 CET (UTC+1) | Lobotka 7' | Report | Vranckx (yellow card) 53'; Iannoni (yellow card) 84' | Stadium: Stadio Diego Armando Maradona; Attendance: 40,000; Referee: Francesco Fourneau |

| 25 January 2026 22 | Juventus | 3–0 | Napoli | Turin |
| 18:00 CET (UTC+1) | David 22'; Yıldız (yellow card) 57', (goal) 77'; Kostić 86' | Report | Juan Jesus (yellow card) 34'; Vergara (yellow card) 73' | Stadium: Juventus Stadium; Attendance: 41,654; Referee: Maurizio Mariani |

| 31 January 2026 23 | Napoli | 2–1 | Fiorentina | Naples |
| 18:00 CET (UTC+1) | Vergara 11'; Gutiérrez 49'; Buongiorno (yellow card) 54' | Report | Fabbian (yellow card) 44'; Solomon 57' | Stadium: Stadio Diego Armando Maradona; Attendance: 40,000; Referee: Federico La Penna |

| 7 February 2026 24 | Genoa | 2–3 | Napoli | Genoa |
| 18:00 CET (UTC+1) | Malinovskyi 3' (pen.); Vásquez (yellow card) 50'; Colombo 57'; Marcandalli (yellow card) 82' | Report | Meret (yellow card) 2'; Højlund 20', 90+5' (pen.); McTominay 22'; Juan Jesus (yellow card) 59' (yellow-red card) 76'; Spinazzola (yellow card) 90+2' | Stadium: Stadio Luigi Ferraris; Attendance: 30,748; Referee: Davide Massa |

| 15 February 2026 25 | Napoli | 2–2 | Roma | Naples |
| 20:45 CET (UTC+1) | Spinazzola 40'; Rrahmani (yellow card) 69'; Alisson 82' | Report | Malen 7', 71' (pen.); Mancini (yellow card) 26' | Stadium: Stadio Diego Armando Maradona; Attendance: 52,000; Referee: Andrea Colombo |

| 22 February 2026 26 | Atalanta | 2–1 | Napoli | Bergamo |
| 15:00 CET (UTC+1) | Pašalić 61'; Zalewski (yellow card) 77'; Samardžić 81' | Report | Beukema 18'; Juan Jesus (yellow card) 37' | Stadium: Gewiss Stadium; Attendance: 22,015; Referee: Daniele Chiffi |

| 28 February 2026 27 | Hellas Verona | 1–2 | Napoli | Verona |
| 18:00 CET (UTC+1) | Akpa Akpro (yellow card) 45+2', (goal) 65'; Suslov (yellow card) 74'; Harroui (yellow card) 82' | Report | Højlund 2'; Vergara (yellow card) 56'; Elmas (yellow card) 71'; Juan Jesus (yellow card) 90'; Lukaku 90+6', (yellow card) 90+7' | Stadium: Stadio Marcantonio Bentegodi; Attendance: 21,027; Referee: Andrea Colombo |

| 6 March 2026 28 | Napoli | 2–1 | Torino | Naples |
| 20:45 CET (UTC+1) | Alisson 7'; Elmas 68' | Report | Gineitis (yellow card) 63'; Ismajli (yellow card) 64'; Lazaro (yellow card) 73'; Casadei 87' | Stadium: Stadio Diego Armando Maradona; Attendance: 49,000; Referee: Michael Fabbri |

| 14 March 2026 29 | Napoli | 2–1 | Lecce | Naples |
| 18:00 CET (UTC+1) | Højlund 46'; Politano 67' | Report | Siebert 3', (yellow card) 19' | Stadium: Stadio Diego Armando Maradona; Attendance: 50,000; Referee: Rosario Abisso |

| 20 March 2026 30 | Cagliari | 0–1 | Napoli | Cagliari |
| 18:30 CET (UTC+1) | Zé Pedro (yellow card) 35'; Dossena (yellow card) 90+4' | Report | McTominay 2'; Lobotka (yellow card) 17'; Olivera (yellow card) 69' | Stadium: Unipol Domus; Attendance: 15,620; Referee: Maurizio Mariani |

| 6 April 2026 31 | Napoli | 1–0 | Milan | Naples |
| 20:45 CEST (UTC+2) | Buongiorno (yellow card) 12'; Politano 79', (yellow card) 82' | Report | | Stadium: Stadio Diego Armando Maradona; Attendance: 50,000; Referee: Daniele Doveri |

| 12 April 2026 32 | Parma | 1–1 | Napoli | Parma |
| 15:00 CEST (UTC+2) | Strefezza 1'; Circati (yellow card) 83' | Report | McTominay 60' | Stadium: Stadio Ennio Tardini; Attendance: 21,611; Referee: Marco Di Bello |

| 18 April 2026 33 | Napoli | 0–2 | Lazio | Naples |
| 18:00 CEST (UTC+2) | Lobotka (yellow card) 29' | Report | Cancellieri 6'; Zaccagni (penalty missed) 31'; Cataldi (yellow card) 33'; Bašić 57'; Taylor (yellow card) 60'; Dia (yellow card) 90+1' | Stadium: Stadio Diego Armando Maradona; Attendance: 50,000; Referee: Luca Zufferli |

| 24 April 2026 34 | Napoli | 4–0 | Cremonese | Naples |
| 20:45 CEST (UTC+2) | McTominay 3', (penalty missed) 83'; Terracciano 45' (o.g.); De Bruyne 45+3'; Alisson 52' | Report | | Stadium: Stadio Diego Armando Maradona; Attendance: 47,000; Referee: Daniele Doveri |

| 2 May 2026 35 | Como | 0–0 | Napoli | Como |
| 18:00 CEST (UTC+2) | Ramón (yellow card) 69' | Report | Politano (yellow card) 89' | Stadium: Stadio Giuseppe Sinigaglia; Attendance: 11,969; Referee: Michael Fabbri |

| 11 May 2026 36 | Napoli | 2–3 | Bologna | Naples |
| 20:45 CEST (UTC+2) | Di Lorenzo 45+2'; Alisson 48'; Politano (yellow card) 84' | Report | Bernardeschi 10', (yellow card) 47'; Orsolini 34' (pen.); João Mário (yellow card) 38'; Helland (yellow card) 58'; Lucumí (yellow card) 69'; Rowe 90+1' | Stadium: Stadio Diego Armando Maradona; Attendance: 47,000; Referee: Marco Piccinini |

| 17 May 2026 37 | Pisa | 0–3 | Napoli | Pisa |
| 12:00 CEST (UTC+2) | Calabresi (yellow card) 53'; Caracciolo (yellow card) 78' | Report | McTominay 21'; Rrahmani 27'; Elmas (yellow card) 53'; Alisson (yellow card) 78'; Højlund 90+2' | Stadium: Stadio Romeo Anconetani; Attendance: 8,000; Referee: Francesco Fourneau |

| 24 May 2026 38 | Napoli | 1–0 | Udinese | Naples |
| 18:00 CEST (UTC+2) | Højlund 24' | Report | Karlström (yellow card) 51'; Kabasele (red card) 65'; Buksa (yellow card) 81'; Miller (yellow card) 90' | Stadium: Stadio Diego Armando Maradona; Attendance: 50,000; Referee: Andrea Zanotti |

=== Coppa Italia ===
| 3 December 2025 Round of 16 | Napoli | 1–1 (9–8 p) | Cagliari | Naples |
| 18:00 CET (UTC+1) | Lucca 28' | Report | Luperto (yellow card) 22'; Esposito 67'; Prati (yellow card) 80' | Stadium: Stadio Diego Armando Maradona; Attendance: 45,000; Referee: Juan Luca Sacchi |
| | Penalties |
| | Politano (penalty scored); McTominay (penalty scored); Lang (penalty scored); Højlund (penalty scored); Neres (penalty missed); Elmas (penalty scored); Milinković-Savić (penalty scored); Spinazzola (penalty scored); Juan Jesus (penalty scored); Buongiorno (penalty scored) | | (penalty scored) Obert; (penalty scored) Borrelli; (penalty scored) Prati; (penalty missed) Felici; (penalty scored) Esposito; (penalty scored) Luperto; (penalty scored) Adopo; (penalty scored) Idrissi; (penalty scored) De Pardo; (penalty missed) Luvumbo |

| 10 February 2026 Quarter-finals | Napoli | 1–1 (6–7 p) | Como | Naples |
| 21:00 CET (UTC+1) | Vergara 46'; Elmas (yellow card) 70' | Report | Baturina 39' (pen.); Ramón (yellow card) 44'; Roberto (yellow card) 62' | Stadium: Stadio Diego Armando Maradona; Attendance: 50,000; Referee: Gianluca Manganiello |
| | Penalties |
| | Politano (penalty scored); Lukaku (penalty missed); Spinazzola (penalty scored); Alisson (penalty scored); Elmas (penalty scored); Milinković-Savić (penalty scored); Gutiérrez (penalty scored); Lobotka (penalty missed) | | (penalty scored) Da Cunha; (penalty scored) Douvikas; (penalty scored) Baturina; (penalty missed) Perrone; (penalty scored) Smolčić; (penalty scored) Diego Carlos; (penalty scored) Vojvoda; (penalty scored) Kempf |

=== Supercoppa Italiana ===
| 18 December 2025 Semi-finals | Napoli | 2–0 | Milan | Riyadh, Saudi Arabia |
| 22:00 SAST (UTC+3) | Neres 39'; Højlund 64'; Spinazzola (yellow card) 81'; McTominay (yellow card) 83' | Report | Rabiot (yellow card) 38'; Tomori (yellow card) 83'; Athekame (yellow card) 85' | Stadium: King Saud University Stadium; Attendance: 24,941; Referee: Luca Zufferli |

| 22 December 2025 Final | Napoli | 2–0 | Bologna | Riyadh, Saudi Arabia |
| 22:00 SAST (UTC+3) | Neres 39', 57'; Politano (yellow card) 79' | Report | Heggem (yellow card) 44'; Cambiaghi (yellow card) 50'; Holm (yellow card) 77' | Stadium: King Saud University Stadium; Attendance: 17,869; Referee: Andrea Colombo |

=== UEFA Champions League ===
==== League phase ====
The draw for the league phase was held on 28 August 2025.

| Pos | Team | Pld | W | D | L | GF | GA | GD | Pts |
|---|---|---|---|---|---|---|---|---|---|
| 28 | (Royal Dutch Football Association) PSV Eindhoven | 8 | 2 | 2 | 4 | 16 | 16 | 0 | 8 |
| 29 | (Royal Spanish Football Federation) Athletic Bilbao | 8 | 2 | 2 | 4 | 9 | 14 | −5 | 8 |
| 30 | (Italian Football Federation) Napoli | 8 | 2 | 2 | 4 | 9 | 15 | −6 | 8 |
| 31 | (Danish Football Association) Copenhagen | 8 | 2 | 2 | 4 | 12 | 21 | −9 | 8 |
| 32 | (Royal Dutch Football Association) Ajax | 8 | 2 | 0 | 6 | 8 | 21 | −13 | 6 |

Source: UEFA
Rules for classification: League phase tiebreakers

| Round | 1 | 2 | 3 | 4 | 5 | 6 | 7 | 8 |
|---|---|---|---|---|---|---|---|---|
| Ground | A | H | A | H | H | A | A | H |
| Result | L | W | L | D | W | L | D | L |
| Position | 30 | 19 | 23 | 24 | 20 | 23 | 25 | 30 |

Source: UEFA
A = Away; H = Home; W = Win; D = Draw; L = Loss

| 18 September 2025 1 | Manchester City (England) | 2–0 | (Italy) Napoli | Manchester, England |
| 20:00 BST (UTC+1) | Haaland 56'; Doku 65' | Report | Di Lorenzo (red card) 21'; Politano (yellow card) 52' | Stadium: City of Manchester Stadium; Attendance: 49,531; Referee: Felix Zwayer (Germany) |

| 1 October 2025 2 | Napoli (Italy) | 2–1 | (Portugal) Sporting CP | Naples, Italy |
| 21:00 CEST (UTC+2) | Højlund 36', 79' | Report | Suárez 62' (pen.) | Stadium: Stadio Diego Armando Maradona; Attendance: 47,364; Referee: Danny Makkelie (Netherlands) |

| 21 October 2025 3 | PSV Eindhoven (Netherlands) | 6–2 | (Italy) Napoli | Eindhoven, Netherlands |
| 21:00 CEST (UTC+2) | Gasiorowski (yellow card) 28'; Veerman (yellow card) 30'; Buongiorno 35' (o.g.); Saibari 38', (yellow card) 70'; Man 54', 80'; Pepi 87'; Driouech 89', (yellow card) 90' | Report | McTominay 31', 86'; Spinazzola (yellow card) 42'; Lucca (red card) 76' | Stadium: Philips Stadion; Attendance: 34,700; Referee: Daniel Siebert (Germany) |

| 4 November 2025 4 | Napoli (Italy) | 0–0 | (Germany) Eintracht Frankfurt | Naples, Italy |
| 18:45 CET (UTC+1) | Rrahmani (yellow card) 50'; Gutiérrez (yellow card) 90+6' | Report | Zetterer (yellow card) 89' | Stadium: Stadio Diego Armando Maradona; Attendance: 45,840; Referee: João Pinheiro (Portugal) |

| 25 November 2025 5 | Napoli (Italy) | 2–0 | (Azerbaijan) Qarabağ | Naples, Italy |
| 21:00 CET (UTC+1) | Lang (yellow card) 50'; Højlund (penalty missed) 56'; McTominay 65'; Janković 72' (o.g.); Rrahmani (yellow card) 77' | Report | Medina (yellow card) 43'; Janković (yellow card) 55' | Stadium: Stadio Diego Armando Maradona; Attendance: 32,019; Referee: Szymon Marciniak (Poland) |

| 10 December 2025 6 | Benfica (Portugal) | 2–0 | (Italy) Napoli | Lisbon, Portugal |
| 21:00 CET (UTC+1) | Ríos 20'; Barreiro 49'; Dedić (yellow card) 78' | Report | Lang (yellow card) 52'; Vergara (yellow card) 87' | Stadium: Estádio da Luz; Attendance: 54,353; Referee: Slavko Vinčić (Slovenia) |

| 20 January 2026 7 | Copenhagen (Denmark) | 1–1 | (Italy) Napoli | Copenhagen, Denmark |
| 21:00 CET (UTC+1) | Delaney (red card) 35'; Elyounoussi (yellow card) 42'; Larsson (penalty missed) 72', 72'; Clem (yellow card) 90+7' | Report | McTominay 39'; Højlund (yellow card) 40'; Di Lorenzo (yellow card) 82' | Stadium: Parken Stadium; Attendance: 35,022; Referee: Irfan Peljto (Bosnia and Herzegovina) |

| 28 January 2026 8 | Napoli (Italy) | 2–3 | (England) Chelsea | Naples, Italy |
| 21:00 CET (UTC+1) | Juan Jesus (yellow card) 17'; Vergara 33'; Højlund 43'; Elmas (yellow card) 75' | Report | Fernández 19' (pen.); João Pedro 61', 82'; Fofana (yellow card) 88' | Stadium: Stadio Diego Armando Maradona; Attendance: 46,513; Referee: Clément Turpin (France) |

== Statistics ==
=== Appearances and goals ===
| No. | Pos | Nat | Player | Total | | Serie A | | Coppa Italia | | Supercoppa Italiana | | Champions League | |
| No. | Pos | Nat | Player | Apps | Goals | Apps | Goals | Apps | Goals | Apps | Goals | Apps | Goals |
Goalkeepers
| 1 | GK | (Italy) ITA | Alex Meret | 12 | 0 | 11 | 0 | 0 | 0 | 0 | 0 | 1 | 0 |
| 14 | GK | (Italy) ITA | Nikita Contini | 1 | 0 | 0+1 | 0 | 0 | 0 | 0 | 0 | 0 | 0 |
| 32 | GK | (Serbia) SRB | Vanja Milinković-Savić | 38 | 0 | 27 | 0 | 2 | 0 | 2 | 0 | 7 | 0 |
Defenders
| 3 | DF | (Spain) ESP | Miguel Gutiérrez | 36 | 1 | 15+13 | 1 | 0+1 | 0 | 0+2 | 0 | 3+2 | 0 |
| 4 | DF | (Italy) ITA | Alessandro Buongiorno | 42 | 0 | 28+5 | 0 | 0+1 | 0 | 0+1 | 0 | 7 | 0 |
| 5 | DF | (Brazil) BRA | Juan Jesus | 35 | 0 | 19+5 | 0 | 2 | 0 | 2 | 0 | 3+4 | 0 |
| 13 | DF | (Kosovo) KOS | Amir Rrahmani | 27 | 2 | 21 | 2 | 1 | 0 | 2 | 0 | 3 | 0 |
| 17 | DF | (Uruguay) URU | Mathías Olivera | 33 | 0 | 15+10 | 0 | 2 | 0 | 0 | 0 | 3+3 | 0 |
| 22 | DF | (Italy) ITA | Giovanni Di Lorenzo | 35 | 2 | 26 | 2 | 0 | 0 | 2 | 0 | 7 | 0 |
| 30 | DF | (Italy) ITA | Pasquale Mazzocchi | 20 | 0 | 2+14 | 0 | 2 | 0 | 0+2 | 0 | 0 | 0 |
| 31 | DF | (Netherlands) NED | Sam Beukema | 32 | 2 | 18+6 | 2 | 2 | 0 | 0 | 0 | 5+1 | 0 |
| 37 | DF | (Italy) ITA | Leonardo Spinazzola | 42 | 3 | 22+10 | 3 | 1+1 | 0 | 2 | 0 | 5+1 | 0 |
Midfielders
| 6 | MF | (Scotland) SCO | Billy Gilmour | 20 | 1 | 8+9 | 1 | 0 | 0 | 0 | 0 | 1+2 | 0 |
| 8 | MF | (Scotland) SCO | Scott McTominay | 44 | 14 | 31+2 | 10 | 0+1 | 0 | 2 | 0 | 8 | 4 |
| 11 | MF | (Belgium) BEL | Kevin De Bruyne | 21 | 5 | 13+5 | 5 | 0 | 0 | 0 | 0 | 3 | 0 |
| 20 | MF | (North Macedonia) MKD | Eljif Elmas | 44 | 1 | 20+13 | 1 | 2 | 0 | 2 | 0 | 4+3 | 0 |
| 26 | MF | (Italy) ITA | Antonio Vergara | 19 | 3 | 8+4 | 1 | 2 | 1 | 0+1 | 0 | 2+2 | 1 |
| 68 | MF | (Slovakia) SVK | Stanislav Lobotka | 41 | 1 | 29+3 | 1 | 1 | 0 | 2 | 0 | 6 | 0 |
| 99 | MF | (Cameroon) CMR | André-Frank Zambo Anguissa | 22 | 4 | 14+4 | 4 | 0 | 0 | 0 | 0 | 4 | 0 |
Forwards
| 7 | FW | (Brazil) BRA | David Neres | 25 | 6 | 10+6 | 3 | 0+1 | 0 | 2 | 3 | 2+4 | 0 |
| 9 | FW | (Belgium) BEL | Romelu Lukaku | 7 | 1 | 0+5 | 1 | 0+1 | 0 | 0 | 0 | 0+1 | 0 |
| 19 | FW | (Denmark) DEN | Rasmus Højlund | 44 | 16 | 32+1 | 12 | 1+1 | 0 | 2 | 1 | 7 | 3 |
| 21 | FW | (Italy) ITA | Matteo Politano | 44 | 2 | 26+8 | 2 | 1+1 | 0 | 2 | 0 | 4+2 | 0 |
| 23 | FW | (Brazil) BRA | Giovane | 13 | 0 | 2+10 | 0 | 1 | 0 | 0 | 0 | 0 | 0 |
| 27 | FW | (Brazil) BRA | Alisson Santos | 15 | 4 | 9+5 | 4 | 0+1 | 0 | 0 | 0 | 0 | 0 |
Players transferred/loaned out during the season
| 27 | FW | (Italy) ITA | Lorenzo Lucca | 23 | 2 | 4+12 | 1 | 1 | 1 | 0+1 | 0 | 1+4 | 0 |
| 35 | DF | (Italy) ITA | Luca Marianucci | 2 | 0 | 1+1 | 0 | 0 | 0 | 0 | 0 | 0 | 0 |
| 69 | FW | (Italy) ITA | Giuseppe Ambrosino | 5 | 0 | 0+3 | 0 | 1 | 0 | 0 | 0 | 0+1 | 0 |
| 70 | FW | (Netherlands) NED | Noa Lang | 27 | 1 | 7+11 | 1 | 0+1 | 0 | 0+2 | 0 | 2+4 | 0 |

Source: Competitions
