= Milinković-Savić =

Milinković-Savić is the surname of two Serbian footballer brothers who were born in Spain.

- Sergej Milinković-Savić (born 1995), Serbian footballer, playing for Al Hilal SFC
- Vanja Milinković-Savić (born 1997), Serbian footballer, playing for SSC Napoli
