= Francisco Baridó =

Argentine footballer (born 2007)

Personal information
- Full name: Francisco Martín Baridó
- Date of birth: 31 December 2007 (age 18)
- Place of birth: Adrogué, Argentina
- Height: 1.75 m (5 ft 9 in)
- Position: Midfielder

Team information
- Current team: Napoli
- Number: 18

Youth career
- 2012–2013: Cultural Mármol (futsal)
- 2014–2024: Boca Juniors
- 2024–2025: Juventus
- 2025–: Napoli

Senior career*
Years	Team	Apps	(Gls)
2025–	Napoli	0	(0)

International career^{‡}
2023–2024	Argentina U15	13	(1)
2025	Argentina U17	4	(0)
- * Club domestic league appearances and goals as of 1 November 2026 ‡ National team caps and goals as of 12 December 2025

Francisco Martín Baridó (born 31 December 2007) is an Argentine footballer who plays as a midfielder for the under-20 team (Campionato Primavera 2) of Serie A club Napoli.

== Club career ==
=== Early career ===
Born in the city of Adrogué, Baridó began his career playing for Central Marmól in futsal, at just five years old. His insinuating dribbles ended up catching the attention of Boca Juniors, the team where he did most of his training as a youngster. Besieged by European teams such as Spanish club Barcelona, he remained with the Xeneize team until January 2024, when he signed for Italian club Juventus on a free transfer, since his parents emigrated to Italy via acquired citizenship and emancipated him (patria potestad).

=== Napoli ===
On 1 September 2025, he moved to the youth academy of fellow Serie A club Napoli, ahead of the 2025–26 season.

Baridó received his first call-up with Napoli for the 2–0 win Supercoppa Italiana semi-final match against AC Milan on 18 December 2025, as an unused substitute. Four days later he was called up again for the final, which Napoli won 2–0 against Bologna on 22 December, but did not play.

He was called-up with the senior team by head coach Massimiliano Allegri during the 2026–27 season, on 1 November 2026, for a 2–0 away loss league match against Juventus, but did not play.

== International career ==
Born in Argentina, Baridó is of Croatian descent through his mother. He represented the Argentine youth teams that competed in the 2023 South American U-15 Championship (held in October 2024), and in the 2025 South American U-17 Championship.

== Career statistics ==
As of match played 1 November 2026

Appearances and goals by club, season and competition
Club	Season	League			Cup		Continental		Other		Total	
Club	Season	Division	Apps	Goals	Apps	Goals	Apps	Goals	Apps	Goals	Apps	Goals
Napoli	2025–26	Serie A	—		—		—		0	0	0	0
Napoli	2026–27	Serie A	0	0	0	0	0	0	0	0	0	0
Career Total			0	0	0	0	0	0	0	0	0	0

== Honours ==
Napoli

- Supercoppa Italiana: 2025–26
