= David Neres =

Brazilian footballer (born 1997)

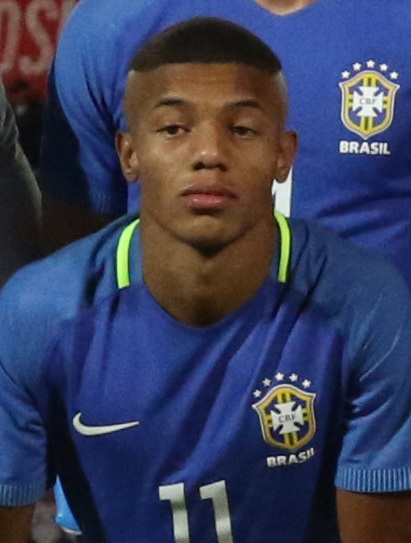
- Neres with Brazil U20 in 2017

Personal information
- Full name: David Neres Campos
- Date of birth: 3 March 1997 (age 29)
- Place of birth: São Paulo, Brazil
- Height: 1.75 m (5 ft 9 in)
- Position: Winger

Team information
- Current team: Napoli
- Number: 7

Youth career
- 2007–2016: São Paulo

Senior career*
Years	Team	Apps	(Gls)
2016	São Paulo	8	(3)
2017	Jong Ajax	5	(3)
2017–2022	Ajax	121	(37)
2022	Shakhtar Donetsk	0	(0)
2022–2024	Benfica	55	(11)
2024–	Napoli	48	(5)

International career
2017	Brazil U20	9	(0)
2020	Brazil U23	2	(0)
2019–2023	Brazil	8	(1)
Medal record
Men's football
Representing Brazil
Copa América
Winner	2019 Brazil
- * Club domestic league appearances and goals as of 23:59, 10 October 2026 (UTC)

David Neres Campos (Brazilian Portuguese: [ˈdejvid ˈnɛɾis]; born 3 March 1997) is a Brazilian professional footballer who plays as a winger for Serie A club Napoli.

Neres is a graduate of São Paulo's youth system and was promoted to the first team in 2016. He joined Ajax in January 2017. At Ajax, Neres established himself as one of the best young wingers in Europe, after winning a domestic double and being an instrumental part of Ajax's first UEFA Champions League semi-final appearance in 22 years, in a breakthrough 2018–19 season. The following seasons were marked by continuous injuries, resulting in Neres playing a limited number of games and declining in performances, leading him to move to Shakhtar Donetsk. Due to the 2022 Russian invasion of Ukraine that occurred in February, he then transferred to Benfica four months later, where he won the domestic double in his debut season. After two years at the Portuguese club, he joined the Italian side Napoli, winning Serie A in his first season.

After representing Brazil at various youth levels, Neres was called up to the full international team for the first time in March 2019, and was part of the squad that won the 2019 Copa América.

== Club career ==
=== São Paulo ===
Born in São Paulo, Neres joined São Paulo's youth setup in September 2007, aged ten. In February 2016, after being regularly used in that year's U-20 Copa Libertadores, he suffered a shoulder injury which kept him sidelined for months.

Neres was promoted to the main squad by manager Ricardo Gomes in August 2016. He made his first team – and Série A debut – on 17 October, coming on as a second-half substitute for Robson in a 2–1 away win against Fluminense.

On 22 October 2016 Neres scored his first goal, netting the last in a 2–0 home win against Ponte Preta. Fourteen days later he scored his second goal, netting the second in a 4–0 home routing of local rival Corinthians.

=== Ajax ===
On 30 January 2017, Neres moved to the Dutch club Ajax for a reported fee of €12 million.

==== 2016–2019: Breakthrough and European semi-final ====
Neres made his debut for Ajax against Heracles Almelo, on 26 February 2017. In that season, he managed to get 3 goals in 8 league matches. He also featured in an Ajax team that went to the UEFA Europa League final that year.

Neres managed to get 14 goals and 13 assists in 32 league matches, making him the most valuable player of Ajax that year, having scored the most goals and assists combined. Neres himself sees the game against Feyenoord, on 22 October 2017, as his breakthrough, where he racked up three assists in a 4–1 away win.

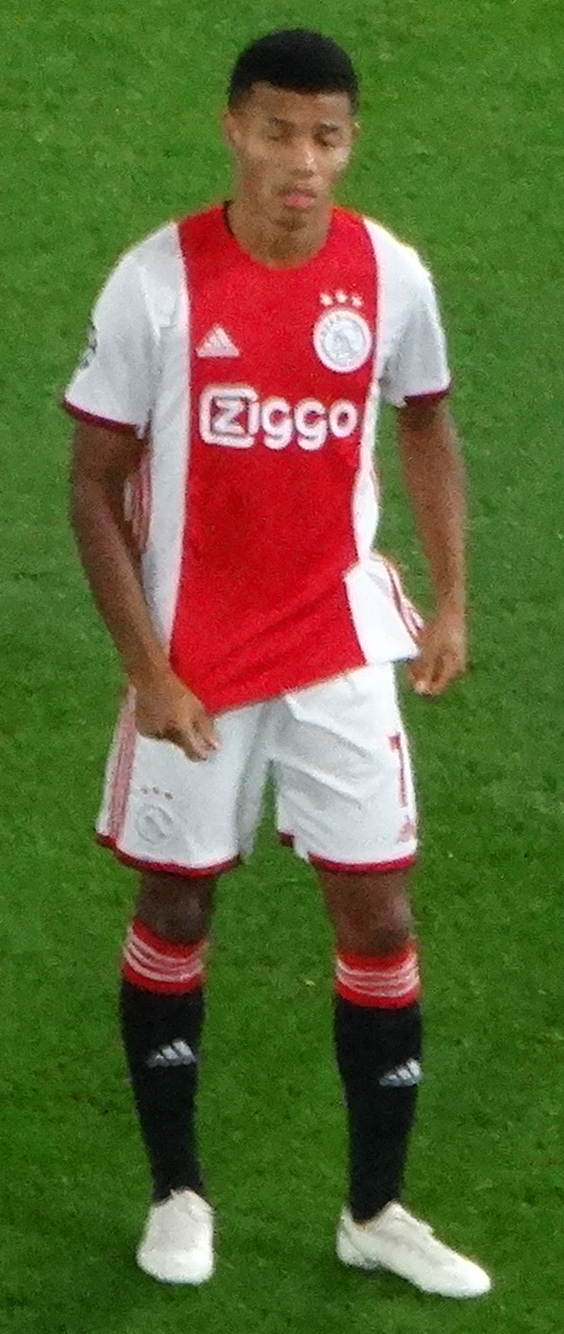
Neres with Ajax in 2019

In his third season, Neres scored his first official European goal against Standard Liège in the second leg of the third qualifying round of the Champions League. In that year, Neres wasn't guaranteed a starting spot up until February. Because of this, there were rumours that Neres wanted to leave. In January, Guangzhou Evergrande made a £36.9 million bid on Neres, but Ajax ultimately refused, because they wanted to keep the team together to win prizes that year and make it far in the UEFA Champions League. In the second leg in the round of 16 of the UEFA Champions League, in a memorable game against Real Madrid, Neres scored the second goal to give Ajax the lead on aggregate, and the Dutch side eventually won the tie by a margin of 5–3, thus knocking the three-time defending European champions out of the competition.

On 31 March 2019, Neres scored the winning goal and picked up a penalty in the championship clash against PSV, to win 3–1. He also scored an important equaliser against Juventus at home to secure hopes for Ajax's semi-final qualification in the first leg at home.

Neres won his first Eredivisie title as Ajax finished three points ahead of rivals PSV. Neres also won his first KNVB Cup when Ajax won 4–0 against Willem II in the final.

==== 2019–2021: Stagnation and final seasons ====
Despite reported interest from the likes of Manchester United and Atlético Madrid, Neres signed a new contract with Ajax on 7 August 2019 that runs through 2023. The deal added a further year to his prior deal that was set to expire in 2022.

At the start of the 2020–21 season, Neres came back after his injury. On 22 November, he scored his first goal in more than a year. Since Ajax acquired Mohamed Daramy and Steven Berghuis as wingers at the beginning of the season, competition for Neres increased, as a result of which he was often no longer included in the starting lineup.

=== Shakhtar Donetsk ===
On 11 January 2022 it was reported that Neres was sold to Ukrainian Premier League side Shakhtar Donetsk for a reported fee of €15 million, which could potentially run up to €17 million with bonuses. On 14 January, Ajax confirmed that the transfer had been completed. On 24 February 2022 following the 2022 Russian invasion of Ukraine, a video was shared online of various Brazilian men's footballers pleading for help from the Brazilian government to help them flee the country. On 1 March 2022 it was reported that the Brazilian players had successfully made it to Romania, from where they travelled home. UEFA president Aleksander Čeferin was personally involved in helping to facilitate the return to safety.

=== Benfica ===
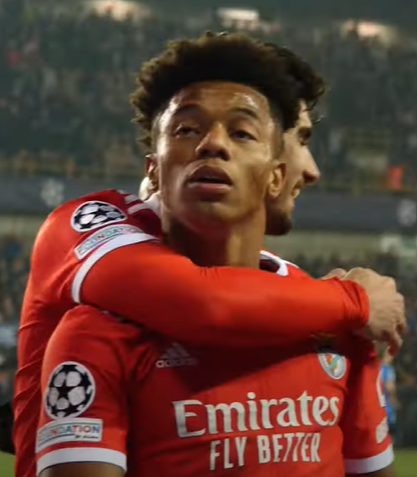
Neres with Benfica in 2023, after scoring the winning goal against Club Brugge during UEFA Champions League

On 20 June 2022, Neres signed a five-year contract with Primeira Liga side Benfica, for a reported fee of €15.3 million. The net cost of the transaction was only €300,000, with both Benfica and Shakhtar settling an agreement for the latter's debt, due to the transfer of compatriot and former teammate Pedrinho, which whom Shakhtar had only paid €3 million of a total of €18 million.

He made his debut for the club on 2 August, providing two assists to Gonçalo Ramos in the 4–1 home win over Midtjylland in the 1st leg of the 2022–23 UEFA Champions League third qualifying round. On 23 August, Neres scored his first goal for the club and provided an assist in the 3–0 home win over Dynamo Kyiv in the 2nd leg of the 2022–23 UEFA Champions League play-off round, helping his side qualify to the tournament. Seven days later, he scored his first Primeira Liga goal in a 3–2 home victory over Paços de Ferreira, reaching six goal contributions in six games.

=== Napoli ===
On 21 August 2024, Neres signed with Napoli in Serie A. Later that year, on 4 October, he came off the bench to score his first Napoli goal in a 3–1 win against Como. He managed to win the 2024–25 Serie A on his debut season with the club. On 22 December 2025, he scored a brace in a 2–0 victory over Bologna in the Supercoppa Italiana final.

== International career ==
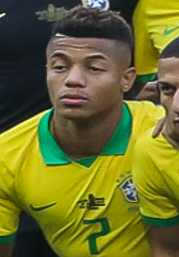
Neres with Brazil at the 2019 Copa América

On 8 March 2019, Neres received his first senior team call-up by coach Tite for the Brazil national football team, replacing an injured Vinícius Júnior, for the friendlies against Panama and the Czech Republic to be held later that month. Neres made his senior team debut against Czech Republic on 26 March 2019, in the 63rd minute as a replacement for Richarlison. In that game, he made an assist and produced a backheel which led to a goal, contributing to two goals in the 3–1 win against Czech Republic.

== Personal life ==
On 12 July 2020, Neres' girlfriend, German model Kira Winona, gave birth to their first child. Their daughter is named Hope Winona Neres.

== Career statistics ==
=== Club ===
As of match played 13 October 2026

Appearances and goals by club, season and competition
Club	Season	League			National cup (Note: Includes KNVB Cup, Taça de Portugal, Coppa Italia)		Continental		Other		Total	
Club	Season	Division	Apps	Goals	Apps	Goals	Apps	Goals	Apps	Goals	Apps	Goals
São Paulo	2016	Série A	8	3	0	0	0	0	3 (Note: Appearances in Copa Paulista)	0	11	3
Jong Ajax	2016–17	Eerste Divisie	4	2	—		—		—		4	2
Jong Ajax	2017–18	Eerste Divisie	1	1	—		—		—		1	1
Jong Ajax	Total		5	3	—		—		—		5	3
Ajax	2016–17	Eredivisie	8	3	0	0	4 (Note: Appearances in UEFA Europa League)	0	—		12	3
Ajax	2017–18	Eredivisie	32	14	2	0	3 (Note: Two appearances in UEFA Champions League, one appearance in UEFA Europa League)	0	—		37	14
Ajax	2018–19	Eredivisie	29	8	6	1	15 (Note: Appearances in UEFA Champions League)	3	—		50	12
Ajax	2019–20	Eredivisie	12	6	0	0	8	0	0	0	20	6
Ajax	2020–21	Eredivisie	25	3	4	2	10 (Note: Four appearances and one goal in UEFA Champions League, six appearances and two goals in UEFA Europa League)	3	—		39	8
Ajax	2021–22	Eredivisie	15	3	1	0	5	1	1 (Note: Appearance in Johan Cruyff Shield)	0	22	4
Ajax	Total		121	37	13	3	45	7	1	0	180	47
Shakhtar Donetsk	2021–22	Ukrainian Premier League	0	0	0	0	0	0	—		0	0
Benfica	2022–23	Primeira Liga	31	6	3	1	12	4	2 (Note: Appearances in Taca da Liga)	1	48	12
Benfica	2023–24	Primeira Liga	24	5	2	0	9 (Note: Three appearances in UEFA Champions League, six appearances in UEFA Europa League)	0	0	0	35	5
Benfica	Total		55	11	5	1	21	4	2	1	83	17
Napoli	2024–25	Serie A	28	2	2	1	—		—		30	3
Napoli	2025–26	Serie A	16	3	1	0	6	0	2 (Note: Appearances in Supercoppa Italiana)	3	25	6
Napoli	2026–27	Serie A	4	0	0	0	2	0	—		6	0
Napoli	Total		48	5	3	1	8	0	2	3	61	9
Career total			235	58	20	5	72	11	8	4	340	79

=== International ===
As of match played 18 October 2023

National team	Year	Apps	Goals
Brazil	2019	7	1
Brazil	2020	0	0
Brazil	2021	0	0
Brazil	2022	0	0
Brazil	2023	1	0
Total		8	1

Scores and results list Brazil's goal tally first.

List of international goals scored by David Neres
No.	Date	Venue	Opponent	Score	Result	Competition
1.	9 June 2019	Estádio Beira-Rio, Porto Alegre, Brazil	Honduras	5–0	7–0	Friendly

== Honours ==
São Paulo

- U-20 Copa Libertadores: 2016

Ajax

- Eredivisie: 2018–19, 2020–21, 2021–22
- KNVB Cup: 2018–19, 2020–21
- Johan Cruyff Shield: 2019

Benfica

- Primeira Liga: 2022–23
- Supertaça Cândido de Oliveira: 2023

Napoli

- Serie A: 2024–25
- Supercoppa Italiana: 2025–26

Brazil

- Copa América: 2019

Individual

- Eredivisie U21 Player of the Year: 2017–18
- Eredivisie Talent of the Month: October 2017
- Eredivisie Player of the Month: April 2018
- UEFA Champions League Squad of the Season: 2018–19
