= Luca Marianucci =

Italian footballer (born 2004)

Personal information
- Date of birth: 23 July 2004 (age 22)
- Place of birth: Livorno, Italy
- Height: 1.94 m (6 ft 4 in)
- Position: Centre-back

Team information
- Current team: Napoli
- Number: 35

Youth career
- 2011–2023: Empoli

Senior career*
Years	Team	Apps	(Gls)
2023–2025	Empoli	18	(0)
2023–2024	→ Pro Sesto (loan)	32	(0)
2025–	Napoli	2	(0)
2026	→ Torino (loan)	10	(0)

International career^{‡}
2025–	Italy U21	4	(1)
- * Club domestic league appearances and goals as of 25 May 2026 ‡ National team caps and goals as of 14 October 2025

Luca Marianucci (born 23 July 2004) is an Italian professional footballer who plays as a centre-back for Serie A club Napoli.

== Career ==
=== Empoli ===
A youth product of Empoli since 2011, Marianucci worked his way up their youth categories. In the summer of 2023 he signed a contract with Empoli until 2027. On 1 September 2023 he joined Pro Sesto on loan in the Serie C for the 2023–24 season. The following season he returned to Empoli, and made his senior and professional debut with Empoli in a 4–1 Coppa Italia win over Catanzaro on 10 August 2024 where he made an assist.

=== Napoli ===
On 14 June 2025, Marianucci signed a contract with Serie A club Napoli.

On 31 January 2026, he was loaned by Torino.

== Playing style ==
Marianucci is a versatile player who can play as a centre-back or right-back. He is very strong physically, and quick which allows him to play both positions.

== Career statistics ==
As of match played 7 January 2026

Appearances and goals by club, season and competition
Club	Season	League			Coppa Italia		Europe		Other		Total	
Club	Season	Division	Apps	Goals	Apps	Goals	Apps	Goals	Apps	Goals	Apps	Goals
Pro Sesto (loan)	2023–24	Serie C	32	0	0	0	—		—		32	0
Empoli	2024–25	Serie A	18	0	6	0	—		—		24	0
Napoli	2025–26	Serie A	2	0	0	0	0	0	0	0	2	0
Career total			52	0	6	0	0	0	0	0	58	0

== Honours ==
Napoli

- Supercoppa Italiana: 2025–26
