= Alessandro Buongiorno =

Italian footballer (born 1999)

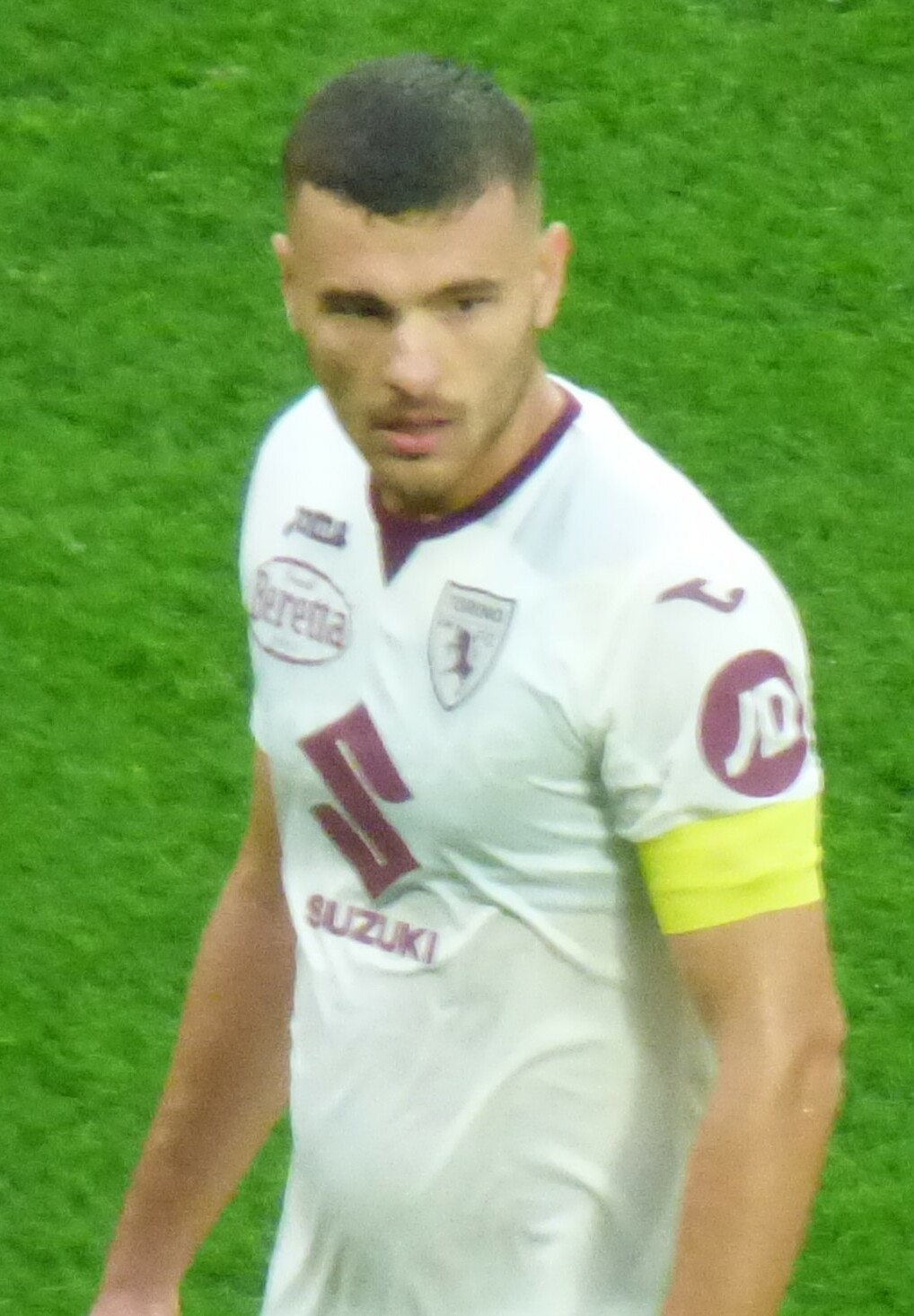
- Buongiorno with Torino in 2023

Personal information
- Full name: Alessandro Buongiorno
- Date of birth: 6 June 1999 (age 27)
- Place of birth: Turin, Italy
- Height: 1.90 m (6 ft 3 in)
- Position: Centre-back

Team information
- Current team: Napoli
- Number: 4

Youth career
- Torino

Senior career*
Years	Team	Apps	(Gls)
2018–2024	Torino	99	(4)
2018–2019	→ Carpi (loan)	18	(0)
2020	→ Trapani (loan)	13	(0)
2024–	Napoli	55	(1)

International career^{‡}
2016–2017	Italy U18	6	(0)
2017–2018	Italy U19	9	(0)
2018–2019	Italy U20	11	(0)
2020	Italy U21	2	(0)
2023–	Italy	12	(0)
Medal record
Men's football
Representing Italy
UEFA Nations League
Third place	2023 Netherlands
- * Club domestic league appearances and goals as of 23:08, 17 May 2026 (UTC) ‡ National team caps and goals as of 16 November 2025

Alessandro Buongiorno (Italian pronunciation: [alesˈsandro ˌbwɔnˈdʒorno]; born 6 June 1999) is an Italian professional footballer who plays as a centre-back for Serie A club Napoli and the Italy national team.

== Early life ==
Born in Turin, but originally from Campania on his grandparents' side, Buongiorno is a childhood fan of Torino.

== Club career ==
=== Early career ===
Buongiorno grew up playing in the Torino youth sector, with whom he won a Coppa Italia Primavera in 2017–18. On 14 February 2018, Buongiorno signed a professional contract with Torino, keeping him in the club until 2022. He made his Serie A debut for Torino in a 4–1 win over Crotone on 4 April 2018, coming on as a substitute in the 82nd minute, but was forced off due to injury in the 88th minute.

=== Loans to Carpi and Trapani ===
In the 2018–19 season, he was loaned to Carpi in Serie B coached by Fabrizio Castori. He debuted on 25 September in a 0–1 loss against Perugia as a substitute for Enrico Pezzi in the 66th minute.

Buongiorno returned to Torino the following season, but did not make any appearance. On 11 January 2020, he joined Serie B club Trapani for the remainder of the season. He played 13 matches, failing to avoid the relegation for the Sicilian club.

=== Torino ===
Returning to Turin, Buongiorno renewed his contract with the club until 2024. On 17 December 2020, he made his debut as a starter in Serie A in the 3–1 defeat against Roma. The following season, with the arrival of Ivan Jurić on Torino's bench, he began to play more regularly in the club's three-man defence, entering the team's rotations.

Buongiorno became a regular starter during the 2022–23 Serie A, and served as club captain on 17 September 2022 in a 1–0 home defeat to Sassuolo. On 3 May 2023, he scored his first league goal in a 2–0 victory against Sampdoria in Genoa. At the end of the season, he renewed his contract until 2028.

=== Napoli ===
On 13 July 2024, Buongiorno was sold to fellow Italian club Napoli for a reported transfer fee of €35 million plus €5 million in bonuses. With Napoli he signed a five-year contract with minimum release clause of €70 million valid from 2027.

== International career ==
On 17 March 2023, Buongiorno received his first official call up to the Italy senior squad for two UEFA Euro 2024 qualifying matches against England and Malta. On 18 June, he debuted in the 2022–23 UEFA Nations League third place play-off against the Netherlands, ending in a 3–2 victory for the Italians.

== Personal life ==
In February 2023, he obtained a three-year degree in Business Economics at the Pegaso Telematic University, presenting a thesis on Torino's marketing model.

== Career statistics ==
=== Club ===
As of match played 17 May 2026

Appearances and goals by club, season and competition
Club	Season	League			Coppa Italia		Europe		Other		Total	
Club	Season	Division	Apps	Goals	Apps	Goals	Apps	Goals	Apps	Goals	Apps	Goals
Torino	2017–18	Serie A	1	0	0	0	—		—		1	0
Torino	2020–21	Serie A	12	0	2	0	—		—		14	0
Torino	2021–22	Serie A	23	0	2	0	—		—		25	0
Torino	2022–23	Serie A	34	1	4	0	—		—		38	1
Torino	2023–24	Serie A	29	3	2	0	—		—		31	3
Torino	Total		99	4	10	0	0	0	0	0	109	4
Carpi (loan)	2018–19	Serie B	18	0	0	0	—		—		18	0
Trapani (loan)	2019–20	Serie B	13	0	0	0	—		—		13	0
Napoli	2024–25	Serie A	22	1	1	0	—		—		23	1
Napoli	2025–26	Serie A	33	0	1	0	7 (Note: Appearances in UEFA Champions League)	0	1 (Note: Appearance in Supercoppa Italiana)	0	42	0
Napoli	Total		55	1	2	0	7	0	1	0	65	1
Career total			185	5	12	0	7	0	1	0	205	5

=== International ===
As of match played 16 November 2025

Appearances and goals by national team and year
National team	Year	Apps	Goals
Italy	2023	2	0
Italy	2024	7	0
Italy	2025	3	0
Total		12	0

== Honours ==
Torino

- Coppa Italia Primavera: 2017–18

Napoli

- Serie A: 2024–25
- Supercoppa Italiana: 2025–26

Individual

- Serie A Team of the Season: 2024–25
