= Mathías Olivera =

Uruguayan footballer (born 1997)

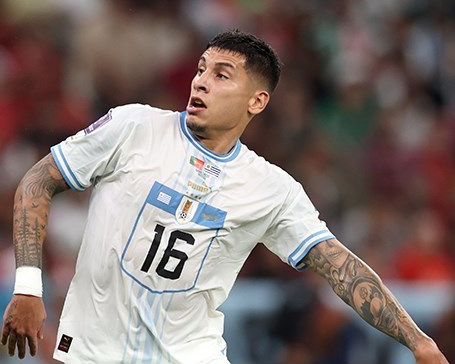
- Olivera playing for Uruguay at the 2022 FIFA World Cup

Personal information
- Full name: Mathías Olivera Miramontes
- Date of birth: 31 October 1997 (age 29)
- Place of birth: Montevideo, Uruguay
- Height: 1.84 m (6 ft 0 in)
- Positions: Left-back; centre-back

Team information
- Current team: Napoli
- Number: 17

Youth career
- Nacional

Senior career*
| Years | Team | Apps | (Gls) |
| 2016–2017 | Nacional | 2 | (0) |
| 2017 | Atenas | 0 | (0) |
| 2017–2022 | Getafe | 105 | (2) |
| 2018–2019 | → Albacete (loan) | 15 | (1) |
| 2022– | Napoli | 119 | (3) |

International career^{‡}
| 2015 | Uruguay U18 | 3 | (0) |
| 2015–2017 | Uruguay U20 | 28 | (3) |
| 2022– | Uruguay | 42 | (2) |
Medal record
Men's football
Representing Uruguay
Copa América
| Third place | 2024 United States |
South American U-20 Championship
| Winner | 2017 Ecuador |
- * Club domestic league appearances and goals as of 23:32, 21 November 2026 (UTC) ‡ National team caps and goals as of 18 November 2026

Mathías Olivera Miramontes (born 31 October 1997) is a Uruguayan professional footballer who plays as a left-back or centre-back for Serie A club Napoli and the Uruguay national team.

After starting his career with few appearance at his home country, he moved to Spanish club Getafe, where he spent five seasons while also being loaned to Albacete in 2018–19. After five years in Spain, he joined Italian club Napoli, winning the Serie A titles in 2022–23 and 2024–25.

Olivera is a former youth international for Uruguay, he made his debut at senior level in January 2022, representing the country at the FIFA World Cup in 2022 and 2026, and the Copa América in 2024.

== Club career ==
=== Uruguay ===
Born in Montevideo, Olivera is a Nacional youth graduate. After progressing through the youth setup, he made his professional debut on 13 February 2016, starting and being booked in a 3–0 away win against River Plate.

Olivera appeared in only one further match for the club, a 2–0 loss at Plaza Colonia on 29 February 2016. In December of that year, he was bought outright by his agent Daniel Fonseca and assigned to Atenas de San Carlos in Segunda División.

In July 2017, Oliveira passed a medical examination at Galatasaray, but eventually did not sign a contract and subsequently returned to Uruguay.

=== Getafe ===
On 14 August 2017, Olivera signed a six-year deal with La Liga club Getafe. He scored his first professional goal on 21 April 2018, netting the game's only in a 1–0 win against Eibar.

==== Loan to Albacete ====
On 4 July 2018, Segunda División side Albacete announced the signing of Olivera on a season-long loan deal. He played 15 matches and scored a goal for the club before his loan was cut short by Getafe on 25 January 2019.

=== Napoli ===
On 26 May 2022, Serie A club Napoli announced the signing of Olivera on a three-year deal.

== International career ==
Olivera has represented Uruguay at youth level. He was part of Uruguay under-20 team which won the 2017 South American U-20 Championship and finished fourth at the 2017 FIFA U-20 World Cup.

On 7 January 2022, Olivera was named in Uruguay's 50-man preliminary squad for 2022 FIFA World Cup qualifying matches against Paraguay and Venezuela. He made his senior team debut on 27 January 2022 in a 1–0 win over Paraguay. He scored his first goal for Uruguay in a 2–2 2026 FIFA World Cup qualifying draw against Colombia on 12 October 2023.

In June 2024, Olivera was called up to represent Uruguay at the 2024 Copa América. In their final group stage match against the United States, he scored the only goal of a 1–0 victory.

On 31 May 2026, Olivera was named in Uruguay's 26-man squad for the 2026 FIFA World Cup.

== Career statistics ==
=== Club ===
As of match played 21 November 2026

Appearances and goals by club, season and competition
| Club | Season | League | | | National cup (Note: Includes Copa del Rey, Coppa Italia) | | Continental | | Total | |
| Club | Season | Division | Apps | Goals | Apps | Goals | Apps | Goals | Apps | Goals |
|---|---|---|---|---|---|---|---|---|---|---|
| Nacional | 2015–16 | Uruguayan Primera División | 2 | 0 | — | | 0 | 0 | 2 | 0 |
| Nacional | 2016 | Uruguayan Primera División | 0 | 0 | — | | — | | 0 | 0 |
| Nacional | Total | | 2 | 0 | 0 | 0 | 0 | 0 | 2 | 0 |
| Atenas | 2017 | Uruguayan Segunda División | 0 | 0 | — | | — | | 0 | 0 |
| Getafe | 2017–18 | La Liga | 3 | 1 | 1 | 0 | — | | 4 | 1 |
| Getafe | 2018–19 | La Liga | 14 | 0 | 0 | 0 | — | | 14 | 0 |
| Getafe | 2019–20 | La Liga | 24 | 0 | 0 | 0 | 5 (Note: Appearances in UEFA Europa League) | 0 | 29 | 0 |
| Getafe | 2020–21 | La Liga | 31 | 0 | 1 | 0 | — | | 32 | 0 |
| Getafe | 2021–22 | La Liga | 32 | 1 | 0 | 0 | — | | 32 | 1 |
| Getafe | Total | | 104 | 2 | 2 | 0 | 5 | 0 | 111 | 2 |
| Albacete (loan) | 2018–19 | Segunda División | 15 | 1 | 0 | 0 | — | | 15 | 1 |
| Napoli | 2022–23 | Serie A | 30 | 2 | 1 | 0 | 8 (Note: Appearances in UEFA Champions League) | 0 | 39 | 2 |
| Napoli | 2023–24 | Serie A | 23 | 1 | 0 | 0 | 6 | 0 | 29 | 1 |
| Napoli | 2024–25 | Serie A | 32 | 0 | 1 | 0 | — | | 33 | 0 |
| Napoli | 2025–26 | Serie A | 25 | 0 | 2 | 0 | 6 | 0 | 33 | 0 |
| Napoli | 2026–27 | Serie A | 9 | 0 | 0 | 0 | 2 | 0 | 11 | 0 |
| Napoli | Total | | 119 | 3 | 4 | 0 | 22 | 0 | 145 | 3 |
| Career total | | | 240 | 6 | 6 | 0 | 27 | 0 | 259 | 6 |

=== International ===
As of match played 17 November 2026

Appearances and goals by national team and year
| National team | Year | Apps | Goals |
|---|---|---|---|
| Uruguay | 2022 | 11 | 0 |
| Uruguay | 2023 | 5 | 1 |
| Uruguay | 2024 | 10 | 1 |
| Uruguay | 2025 | 7 | 0 |
| Uruguay | 2026 | 9 | 0 |
| Total | | 42 | 2 |

Scores and results list Uruguay’s goal tally first, score column indicates score after each Olivera goal.

List of international goals scored by Mathías Olivera
| No. | Date | Venue | Opponent | Score | Result | Competition |
|---|---|---|---|---|---|---|
| 1 | 12 October 2023 | Estadio Metropolitano Roberto Meléndez, Barranquilla, Colombia | Colombia | 1–1 | 2–2 | 2026 FIFA World Cup qualification |
| 2 | 1 July 2024 | Arrowhead Stadium, Kansas City, United States | United States | 1–0 | 1–0 | 2024 Copa América |

== Honours ==
Napoli

- Serie A: 2022–23, 2024–25
- Supercoppa Italiana: 2025–26

Uruguay U-20

- South American U-20 Championship: 2017

Uruguay

- Copa América third place: 2024
