= Giuseppe Ambrosino =

Italian footballer (born 2003)

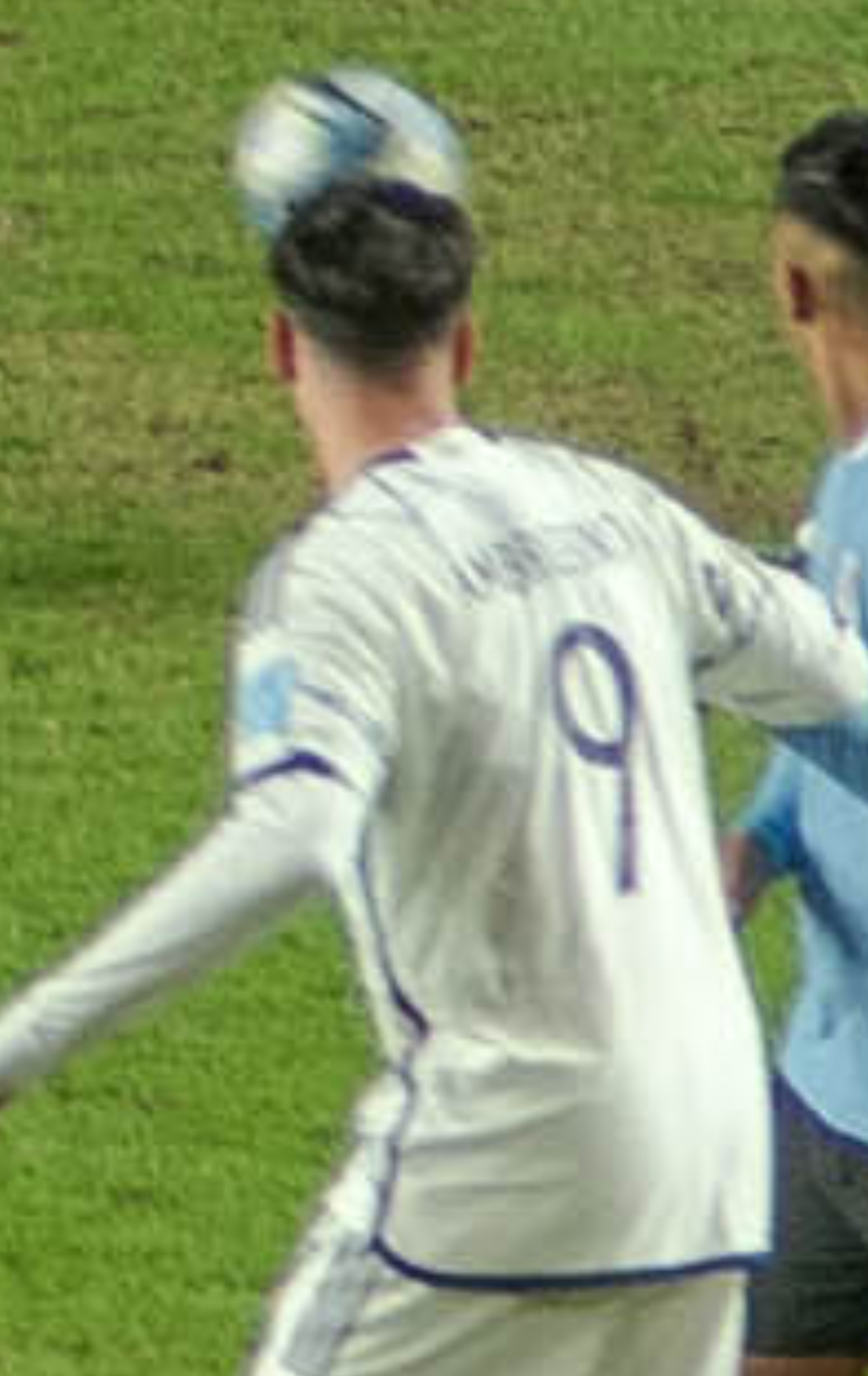
- Ambrosino playing for Italy U20 in 2023

Personal information
- Full name: Giuseppe Ambrosino Di Bruttopilo
- Date of birth: 10 September 2003 (age 23)
- Place of birth: Procida, Italy
- Height: 1.85 m (6 ft 1 in)
- Position: Forward

Team information
- Current team: Modena (on loan from Napoli)
- Number: 70

Youth career
- 2009–2013: Procida Calcio
- 2013–2022: Napoli

Senior career*
| Years | Team | Apps | (Gls) |
| 2022– | Napoli | 3 | (0) |
| 2022–2023 | → Como (loan) | 4 | (1) |
| 2023 | → Cittadella (loan) | 15 | (1) |
| 2023–2024 | → Catanzaro (loan) | 28 | (3) |
| 2024–2025 | → Frosinone (loan) | 36 | (5) |
| 2026– | → Modena (loan) | 14 | (2) |

International career^{‡}
| 2022 | Italy U19 | 8 | (1) |
| 2022–2023 | Italy U20 | 12 | (4) |
| 2023–2025 | Italy U21 | 11 | (2) |
Medal record
Men's football
Representing Italy
FIFA U-20 World Cup
| Runner-up | 2023 Argentina |
- * Club domestic league appearances and goals as of 10 May 2026 ‡ National team caps and goals as of 22 June 2025

Giuseppe Ambrosino Di Bruttopilo (born 10 September 2003) is an Italian professional footballer who plays as a forward for Serie B club Modena, on loan from Napoli.

== Club career ==
Born in the island of Procida, Ambrosino first started playing football at the eponymous local grassroots club, where he was coached by his father, before joining Napoli's youth sector in 2013, aged ten. Having traveled from his hometown to Naples and vice versa for several years, the forward eventually relocated to Castel Volturno in 2020, in order to stay closer to the club's training facilities.

Following his performances in the Campionato Primavera 1, Ambrosino signed his first professional contract with Napoli in January 2022, and then became the under-19 league's top goalscorer at the end of the 2021–22 campaign. Around the same period of time, he also received his first call-ups to the first team, under head coach Luciano Spalletti.

On 1 September 2022, Ambrosino joined Serie B club Como on a season-long loan. He made his professional debut on 8 December, coming in as a substitute for Leonardo Mancuso at the 80th minute of a 0–0 league draw against Palermo. Then, he scored his first professional goal on 18 December, as he took part in a 3-0 league win against Ternana.

On 18 January 2023, Ambrosino was re-called by Napoli and subsequently sent out on a new loan to fellow Serie B side Cittadella. Three days later, he made his debut for the club, replacing Tommy Maistrello in the 71st minute of a goalless league draw against Cagliari. On 28 January, he made his first professional start in a 1–1 league draw against Venezia.

On 4 August 2023, Ambrosino joined newly promoted Serie B club Catanzaro on a season-long loan.

On 24 July 2024, Ambrosino moved on a new loan to Frosinone.

Upon his return from Frosinone loan, Ambrosino made his Serie A debut for Napoli against Cagliari on 30 August 2025. He also made his European debut in the Champions League game against Copenhagen.

On 2 February 2026, Ambrosini was loaned once again, this time to Serie B club Modena.

== International career ==
Ambrosino has represented Italy at youth international level, having played for the under-19 and under-20 national teams.

In June 2022, he was included in the Italian squad that took part in the 2022 UEFA European Under-19 Championship in Slovakia. He featured in every match, as the Azzurrini reached the semi-finals, before losing to eventual winners England.

In December 2022, he was involved in a training camp led by the Italian senior national team's manager, Roberto Mancini, and aimed to the most promising national talents.

In May 2023, he was included in the Italian squad that took part in the FIFA U-20 World Cup in Argentina, where the Azzurrini finished runners-up after losing to Uruguay in the final match.

== Style of play ==
Ambrosino has been described as a complete forward, who can play either as a number 9 or a shadow striker. He has been mainly regarded for his pace, his technique and his shooting abilities, but his ambidexterity, his tactical intelligence and his vision were also noticed.

He cited Zlatan Ibrahimović as his main source of inspiration, although he received comparisons to Dries Mertens, as well.

== Personal life ==
His father, Domenico, was also a footballer.

== Career statistics ==
=== Club ===
As of match played 20 January 2026

Appearances and goals by club, season and competition
| Club | Season | League | | | Coppa Italia | | Other | | Total | |
| Club | Season | Division | Apps | Goals | Apps | Goals | Apps | Goals | Apps | Goals |
|---|---|---|---|---|---|---|---|---|---|---|
| Napoli | 2021–22 | Serie A | 0 | 0 | 0 | 0 | 0 | 0 | 0 | 0 |
| Napoli | 2025–26 | Serie A | 3 | 0 | 1 | 0 | 1 (Note: Appearance in UEFA Champions League) | 0 | 5 | 0 |
| Napoli | Total | | 3 | 0 | 1 | 0 | 1 | 0 | 5 | 0 |
| Como (loan) | 2022–23 | Serie B | 4 | 1 | — | | — | | 4 | 1 |
| Cittadella (loan) | 2022–23 | Serie B | 15 | 1 | — | | — | | 15 | 1 |
| Catanzaro (loan) | 2023–24 | Serie B | 28 | 3 | 0 | 0 | 0 | 0 | 28 | 3 |
| Frosinone (loan) | 2024–25 | Serie B | 36 | 5 | 1 | 0 | — | | 37 | 5 |
| Career total | | | 86 | 10 | 2 | 0 | 1 | 0 | 89 | 10 |

== Honours ==
Napoli

- Supercoppa Italiana: 2025–26

Italy U20

- FIFA U-20 World Cup runner-up: 2023

Individual

- Campionato Primavera 1 top scorer: 2021–22
- UEFA European Under-19 Championship Team of the Tournament: 2022
