= Antonio Vergara =

Italian footballer (born 2003)

Personal information
- Date of birth: 16 January 2003 (age 23)
- Place of birth: Frattaminore, Italy
- Height: 1.82 m (6 ft 0 in)
- Positions: Attacking midfielder; winger

Team information
- Current team: Napoli
- Number: 26

Youth career
- 2007–2008: Frattese 2000
- 2008–2010: Virtus Crispano
- 2010–2014: PD F.lli Lod
- 2014–2022: Napoli

Senior career*
| Years | Team | Apps | (Gls) |
| 2022– | Napoli | 19 | (2) |
| 2022–2023 | → Pro Vercelli (loan) | 34 | (3) |
| 2023–2025 | → Reggiana (loan) | 39 | (5) |

International career^{‡}
| 2022 | Italy U19 | 1 | (0) |
| 2026– | Italy | 4 | (0) |
- * Club domestic league appearances and goals as of 8 November 2026 ‡ National team caps and goals as of 15 November 2026

Antonio Vergara (born 16 January 2003) is an Italian professional footballer who plays as an attacking midfielder and right winger for Serie A club Napoli and the Italy national team.

== Club career ==
Born in Frattaminore, Vergara is a product of the youth academies of Frattese 2000, Virtus Crispano, PD F.lli Lod and Napoli. On 11 March 2021, he signed his first professional contract with Napoli. On 15 July 2022, he joined Pro Vercelli on a season long loan in the Serie C where he made his professional debut. On 24 July 2023, he was loaned to Reggiana in the Serie B for a season. His first season was cut short by a rupture to the anterior cruciate ligament, but on 1 February 2024 his loan with Reggiana was extended an additional season until 30 June 2025.

Vergara returned to Napoli for the 2025–26 season, and made his debut as a substitute in a 2–0 win over Sassuolo on 23 August 2025. On 28 January 2026, he scored his first goal with a solo run in a 2–3 defeat against Chelsea in the Champions League.

== International career ==
Vergara was called up to the Italy U19s for a set of friendlies in February 2022.

He was one of the players who were called up with the Italy national team by head coach Roberto Mancini for the 2026–27 UEFA Nations League matches against Belgium, Turkey and France between 25 September and 5 October 2026.

== Career statistics ==
=== Club ===
As of match played 8 November 2026

Appearances and goals by club, season and competition
| Club | Season | League | | | National cup | | Europe | | Other | | Total | |
| Club | Season | Division | Apps | Goals | Apps | Goals | Apps | Goals | Apps | Goals | Apps | Goals |
|---|---|---|---|---|---|---|---|---|---|---|---|---|
| Pro Vercelli (loan) | 2022–23 | Serie C | 34 | 3 | 1 | 0 | — | | — | | 35 | 3 |
| Reggiana (loan) | 2023–24 | Serie B | 7 | 0 | 2 | 0 | — | | — | | 9 | 0 |
| Reggiana (loan) | 2024–25 | Serie B | 32 | 5 | 1 | 0 | — | | — | | 33 | 5 |
| Reggiana (loan) | Total | | 39 | 5 | 3 | 0 | — | | — | | 42 | 5 |
| Napoli | 2025–26 | Serie A | 12 | 1 | 2 | 1 | 4 (Note: Appearances in UEFA Champions League) | 1 | 1 (Note: Appearance in Supercoppa Italiana) | 0 | 19 | 3 |
| Napoli | 2026–27 | Serie A | 7 | 1 | 0 | 0 | 2 | 0 | — | | 9 | 1 |
| Napoli | Total | | 19 | 2 | 2 | 1 | 6 | 1 | 1 | 0 | 28 | 4 |
| Career total | | | 92 | 10 | 6 | 1 | 6 | 1 | 1 | 0 | 105 | 12 |

=== International ===
As of match played 15 November 2026

Appearances and goals by national team and year
| National team | Year | Apps | Goals |
|---|---|---|---|
| Italy | 2026 | 4 | 0 |
| Total | | 4 | 0 |

== Honours ==
Napoli

- Supercoppa Italiana: 2025–26

Individual

- Serie A Rising Star of the Month: February 2026
