= Rasmus Højlund =

Danish footballer (born 2003)

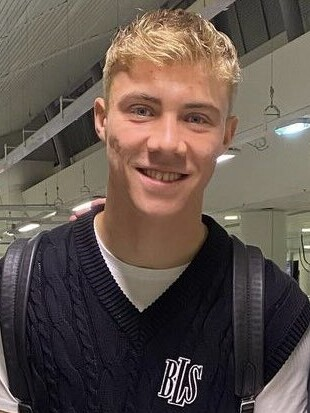
- Højlund in 2023

Personal information
- Full name: Rasmus Winther Højlund
- Date of birth: 4 February 2003 (age 23)
- Place of birth: Copenhagen, Denmark
- Height: 1.91 m (6 ft 3 in)
- Position: Striker

Team information
- Current team: Napoli
- Number: 19

Youth career
- 2007–2014: Hørsholm-Usserød
- 2015–2016: Brøndby
- 2016–2020: Copenhagen

Senior career*
Years	Team	Apps	(Gls)
2020–2022	Copenhagen	19	(0)
2022	Sturm Graz	18	(9)
2022–2023	Atalanta	32	(9)
2023–2026	Manchester United	62	(14)
2025–2026	→ Napoli (loan)	33	(12)
2026–	Napoli	11	(3)

International career^{‡}
2018–2019	Denmark U16	10	(1)
2019	Denmark U17	5	(1)
2021–2022	Denmark U19	9	(1)
2022	Denmark U21	3	(0)
2022–	Denmark	41	(19)
- * Club domestic league appearances and goals as of 14:20, 21 November 2026 (UTC) ‡ National team caps and goals as of 21:50, 17 November 2026 (UTC)

Rasmus Winther Højlund (Danish pronunciation: [ˈʁɑsmus ˈhʌjˌlɔnˀ]; born 4 February 2003) is a Danish professional footballer who plays as a striker for Serie A club Napoli and the Denmark national team.

Højlund graduated from Copenhagen's youth academy, making his first-team debut for the club aged 17 in October 2020. After scoring five goals in 32 appearances for Copenhagen, he joined Austrian club Sturm Graz in January 2022. Later that year, he was signed by Atalanta for €17 million, before moving to Manchester United in 2023, for an initial fee of £64 million.

Højlund played youth international football for Denmark from under-16 to under-21 level. He made his senior international debut in September 2022.

== Club career ==
=== Early career ===
Højlund was born in Copenhagen and grew up in Hørsholm, Capital Region. He played youth football for Hørsholm-Usserød from 2007 to 2014, and then Brøndby, before joining Copenhagen's youth system.

On 25 October 2020, Højlund made his professional debut for Copenhagen at the age of 17. In December 2020, he extended his contract with the club until 31 December 2023. After the 2021 summer break, he was promoted to the first team squad.

During the 2021–22 season, Højlund made his debut in European competitions, contributing five goals in the UEFA Europa Conference League across qualification rounds and the tournament proper. He scored his first two goals for the club on 29 July 2021, when he was substituted at half-time in a match against Torpedo-BelAZ Zhodino in the Conference League.

=== Sturm Graz ===
In January 2022, Højlund joined Austrian Bundesliga club Sturm Graz for a reported fee of €1.8 million. He scored 12 goals in 21 games across all competitions during the remainder of the 2021–22 season and the start of the 2022–23 season.

=== Atalanta ===
On 27 August 2022, Højlund signed for Serie A club Atalanta in a deal worth a reported €17 million. He scored his first goal for Atalanta on 5 September in a 2–0 away win over Monza. Initially confined to a substitute role at the beginning of the season, he carved out a place for himself in the squad due to the poor form and injuries of usual starter, Duván Zapata. In January 2023, he went on to deliver several convincing performances, notably scoring four goals in four consecutive games.

=== Manchester United ===
On 29 July 2023, Premier League side Manchester United agreed a deal to sign Højlund from Atalanta for an initial £64 million fee plus £8 million in performance related add-ons, with the player agreeing a five-year deal with the option of an extra year. He was then announced officially as a United player on 5 August 2023, subject to international clearance.

==== 2023–24: Debut season and adaptation ====
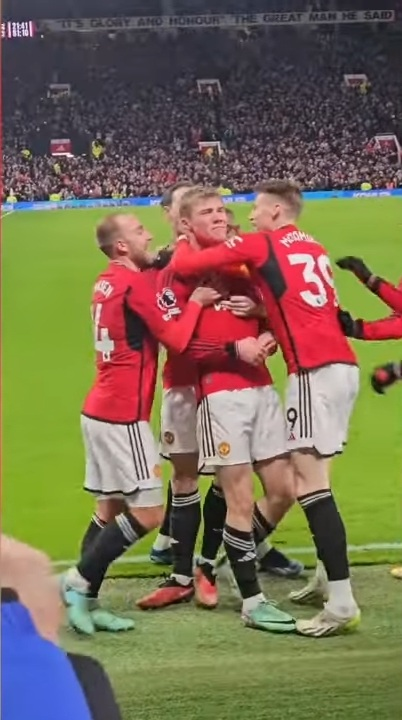
Højlund (centre) celebrating a goal scored in 2023

Højlund made his debut on 3 September, replacing Anthony Martial in the 67th minute of a Premier League match against Arsenal, which ended in a 3–1 defeat. On 20 September, Højlund scored his first goal for the club in a 4–3 away defeat against Bayern Munich in the opening match of the 2023–24 Champions League. In United's second Champions League fixture against Galatasaray at Old Trafford, he scored twice as United lost 3–2, and was named man of the match despite the defeat. On 8 November, Højlund scored twice on his return to Parken in a 4–3 defeat to his former club Copenhagen. He became the youngest player to score twice in an away Champions League match for Manchester United. On 26 December, Højlund scored his first Premier League goal, the winner in a 3–2 home victory over Aston Villa. The goal came in his fifteenth appearance for the club, as United fought from 2–0 down to win.

On 4 February 2024, his 21st birthday, Højlund scored the opener in Manchester United's 3–0 victory over West Ham United. A week later on 11 February, Højlund opened the scoring again, this time against Aston Villa in a 2–1 away victory, becoming the second youngest player to ever score in five successive Premier League appearances, behind only Nicolas Anelka. On 18 February, he scored both of United's goals in a 2–1 victory over Luton Town, the first of which came just 37 seconds into the match. This made him the youngest player to score in six consecutive Premier League games ahead of Joe Willock's previous record. After his performances in February, Højlund won the Premier League Player of the Month, becoming the first Danish player in Premier League history to win the award. On 21 April, in the FA Cup semi-final against Coventry City, Højlund scored the winning kick of the penalty shootout to send Manchester United to the 2024 FA Cup final after a 3–3 draw after extra time in a match that notably saw United throw away a 3–0 lead. In the final on 25 May, Højlund won his first trophy with the club as he featured as a late substitute for Marcus Rashford, helping secure a 2–1 victory over local rivals Manchester City.

After scoring in the final two fixtures against Newcastle United and Brighton & Hove Albion, Højlund ended his first season at Manchester United with ten Premier League goals. He also scored five goals from six Champions League appearances as well as one goal in the FA Cup.

==== 2024–25: Struggles and goal-drought ====
Ahead of the 2024–25 season in which he wore number 11, Højlund was assigned the squad number 9, taking the shirt from the recently departed Anthony Martial. On 3 October 2024, he scored his first goal of the season in a 3–3 draw with Porto in the UEFA Europa League. On 19 October, Højlund scored his first league goal of the season in a 2–1 home victory against Brentford, ending Manchester United's winless run of five games in the process.

On 12 December 2024, Højlund scored a brace off the bench to give United a 2–1 comeback victory away to Viktoria Plzeň. This made him one of three United players to have scored nine goals in Europe at 21 years of age or below, the others being Marcus Rashford and Wayne Rooney.

During the season, Højlund came under fire from pundits and fans for his lacklustre performances; he experienced a streak of 16 Premier League matches without scoring, with his last league goal coming on 7 December 2024 in a 2–3 home defeat to Nottingham Forest. Former United player Rio Ferdinand said he "always [tries] to fight [defenders] and make contact".

On 16 March 2025, Højlund ended his 21-game goalless streak, netting the opening goal in a 3–0 win away over Leicester City. Following a poor performance in the UEFA Europa League final against Tottenham, Manchester United put Højlund and several other players on the transfer list.

=== Napoli ===
On 1 September 2025, Højlund joined Napoli on a season-long loan deal, with an obligation to buy if Napoli qualified for the 2026–27 UEFA Champions League. The deal included a €6 million loan fee, and potential fee for the permanent transfer to be around £38 million (€44 million) if Napoli qualified for the Champions League. On 13 September, he scored his first goal on his debut in a 3–1 away win over Fiorentina. On 1 October, he scored a brace in the league phase of the Champions League against Sporting CP.

Højlund scored a stoppage-time goal as Napoli secured qualification for the Champions League with a 3–0 away victory over Pisa on 17 May 2026. The qualification triggered Napoli's obligation to buy Højlund permanently from Manchester United. On 3 June 2026, Napoli officially confirmed that the conditions for Højlund's permanent transfer had been met.

== International career ==
In September 2022, Højlund played his first international matches for Denmark against Croatia and France during the UEFA Nations League, debuting against the former opponent on 1 September. On 23 March 2023, he made his first international start, scoring a hat-trick in a 3–1 victory against Finland during the UEFA Euro 2024 qualifying, his first goals for his country. He ended the qualification phase as Denmark's top-scorer with seven goals. Højlund was selected for Denmark's UEFA Euro 2024 squad, debuting in their opening fixture against Slovenia.

== Personal life ==
Rasmus's younger twin brothers, Emil and Oscar Højlund, are both professional footballers.

== Career statistics ==
=== Club ===
As of match played 21 November 2026

Appearances and goals by club, season and competition
Club	Season	League			National cup (Note: Includes Danish Cup, Austrian Cup, Coppa Italia, FA Cup)		League cup (Note: Includes EFL Cup)		Europe		Other		Total	
Club	Season	Division	Apps	Goals	Apps	Goals	Apps	Goals	Apps	Goals	Apps	Goals	Apps	Goals
Copenhagen	2020–21	Danish Superliga	4	0	1	0	—		0	0	—		5	0
Copenhagen	2021–22	Danish Superliga	15	0	1	0	—		11 (Note: Appearances in UEFA Europa Conference League)	5	—		27	5
Copenhagen	Total		19	0	2	0	—		11	5	—		32	5
Sturm Graz	2021–22	Austrian Bundesliga	13	6	—		—		—		—		13	6
Sturm Graz	2022–23	Austrian Bundesliga	5	3	1	2	—		2 (Note: Appearances in UEFA Champions League)	1	—		8	6
Sturm Graz	Total		18	9	1	2	—		2	1	—		21	12
Atalanta	2022–23	Serie A	32	9	2	1	—		—		—		34	10
Manchester United	2023–24	Premier League	30	10	5	1	2	0	6	5	—		43	16
Manchester United	2024–25	Premier League	32	4	3	0	2	0	15 (Note: Appearances in UEFA Europa League)	6	0	0	52	10
Manchester United	Total		62	14	8	1	4	0	21	11	0	0	95	26
Napoli (loan)	2025–26	Serie A	33	12	2	0	—		7	3	2 (Note: Appearances in Supercoppa Italiana)	1	44	16
Napoli	2026–27	Serie A	11	3	0	0	—		4	0	—		15	3
Napoli	Napoli total		44	15	2	0	—		11	3	2	1	59	19
Career total			175	47	15	4	4	0	45	20	2	1	241	72

=== International ===
As of match played 17 November 2026

Appearances and goals by national team and year
National team	Year	Apps	Goals
Denmark	2022	2	0
Denmark	2023	8	7
Denmark	2024	12	0
Denmark	2025	9	6
Denmark	2026	10	6
Total		41	19

Denmark score listed first, score column indicates score after each Højlund goal.

List of international goals scored by Rasmus Højlund
No.	Date	Venue	Cap	Opponent	Score	Result	Competition
1	23 March 2023	Parken Stadium, Copenhagen, Denmark	3	Finland	1–0	3–1	UEFA Euro 2024 qualifying
2	23 March 2023	Parken Stadium, Copenhagen, Denmark	3	Finland	2–1	3–1	UEFA Euro 2024 qualifying
3	23 March 2023	Parken Stadium, Copenhagen, Denmark	3	Finland	3–1	3–1	UEFA Euro 2024 qualifying
4	26 March 2023	Astana Arena, Astana, Kazakhstan	4	Kazakhstan	1–0	2–3	UEFA Euro 2024 qualifying
5	26 March 2023	Astana Arena, Astana, Kazakhstan	4	Kazakhstan	2–0	2–3	UEFA Euro 2024 qualifying
6	19 June 2023	Stožice Stadium, Ljubljana, Slovenia	6	Slovenia	1–1	1–1	UEFA Euro 2024 qualifying
7	17 October 2023	San Marino Stadium, Serravalle, San Marino	10	San Marino	1–0	2–1	UEFA Euro 2024 qualifying
8	20 March 2025	Parken Stadium, Copenhagen, Denmark	23	Portugal	1–0	1–0	2024–25 UEFA Nations League A
9	8 September 2025	Karaiskakis Stadium, Piraeus, Greece	28	Greece	3–0	3–0	2026 FIFA World Cup qualification
10	9 October 2025	ZTE Arena, Zalaegerszeg, Hungary	29	Belarus	2–0	6–0	2026 FIFA World Cup qualification
11	9 October 2025	ZTE Arena, Zalaegerszeg, Hungary	29	Belarus	3–0	6–0	2026 FIFA World Cup qualification
12	12 October 2025	Parken Stadium, Copenhagen, Denmark	30	Greece	1–0	3–1	2026 FIFA World Cup qualification
13	18 November 2025	Hampden Park, Glasgow, Scotland	31	Scotland	1–1	2–4	2026 FIFA World Cup qualification
14	24 September 2026	Ullevaal Stadion, Oslo, Norway	36	Norway	2–2	2–3	2026–27 UEFA Nations League A
15	1 October 2026	Parken Stadium, Copenhagen, Denmark	38	Portugal	2–2	2–4	2026–27 UEFA Nations League A
16	4 October 2026	Cardiff City Stadium, Cardiff, Wales	39	Wales	1–0	1–0	2026–27 UEFA Nations League A
17	14 November 2026	Estádio Municipal de Braga, Braga, Portugal	40	Portugal	2–0	4–1	2026–27 UEFA Nations League A
18	14 November 2026	Estádio Municipal de Braga, Braga, Portugal	40	Portugal	3–0	4–1	2026–27 UEFA Nations League A
19	17 November 2026	Parken Stadium, Copenhagen, Denmark	41	Norway	1–0	2–3	2026–27 UEFA Nations League A

== Honours ==
Copenhagen

- Danish Superliga: 2021–22

Manchester United

- FA Cup: 2023–24
- UEFA Europa League runner-up: 2024–25

Napoli

- Supercoppa Italiana: 2025–26

Individual

- Danish Talent of the Year: 2023
- Premier League Player of the Month: February 2024
- Serie A Rising Star of the Month: December 2025
- EA Sports FC Serie A Team of the Season: 2025–26
