= Vanja Milinković-Savić =

Spanish-born Serbian footballer (born 1997)

Vanja Milinković-Savić Вања Милинковић-Савић
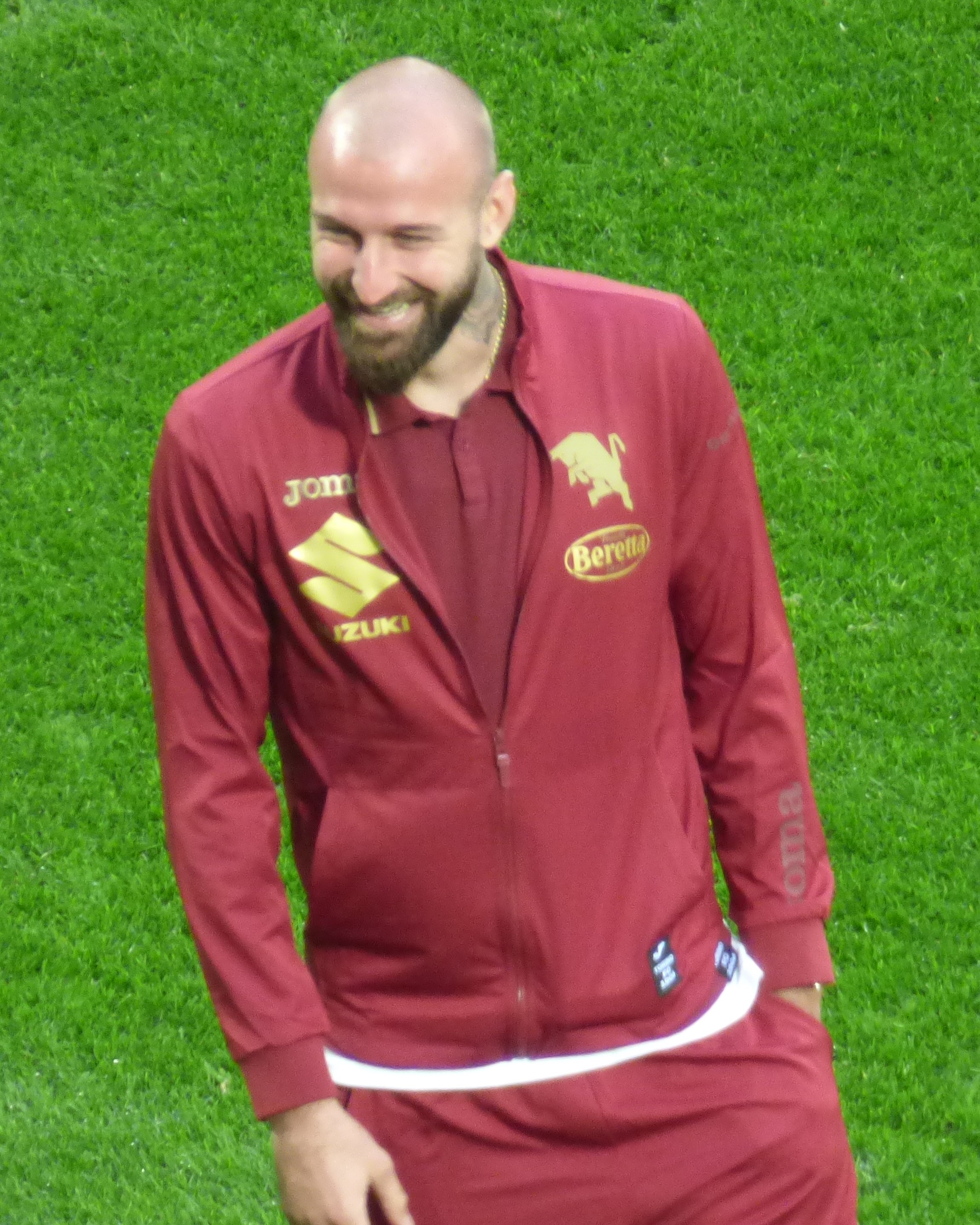
- Milinković-Savić with Torino in 2023

Personal information
- Full name: Vanja Milinković-Savić
- Date of birth: 20 February 1997 (age 29)
- Place of birth: Ourense, Galicia, Spain
- Height: 2.02 m (6 ft 8 in)
- Position: Goalkeeper

Team information
- Current team: Napoli
- Number: 32

Youth career
- Grazer AK
- 2006–2014: Vojvodina

Senior career*
Years	Team	Apps	(Gls)
2014–2015	Manchester United	0	(0)
2014–2015	→ Vojvodina (loan)	17	(0)
2016–2017	Lechia Gdańsk	29	(0)
2017–2026	Torino	144	(0)
2018–2019	→ SPAL (loan)	2	(0)
2019	→ Ascoli (loan)	8	(0)
2019–2020	→ Standard Liège (loan)	0	(0)
2025–2026	→ Napoli (loan)	27	(0)
2026–	Napoli	5	(0)

International career^{‡}
2013–2014	Serbia U17	6	(0)
2014–2016	Serbia U19	9	(0)
2014–2015	Serbia U20	3	(0)
2016–2017	Serbia U21	10	(1)
2021–	Serbia	24	(0)
Medal record
Men's football
Representing Serbia
FIFA U-20 World Cup
Winner	2015
- * Club domestic league appearances and goals as of 23:54, 21 November 2026 (UTC) ‡ National team caps and goals as of 13 November 2026

Vanja Milinković-Savić (Serbian Cyrillic: Вања Милинковић-Савић, pronounced [ʋâɲa milǐːŋkoʋitɕ sǎːʋitɕ]; born 20 February 1997) is a professional footballer who plays as a goalkeeper for Serie A club Napoli. Born in Spain, he plays for the Serbia national team.

== Club career ==
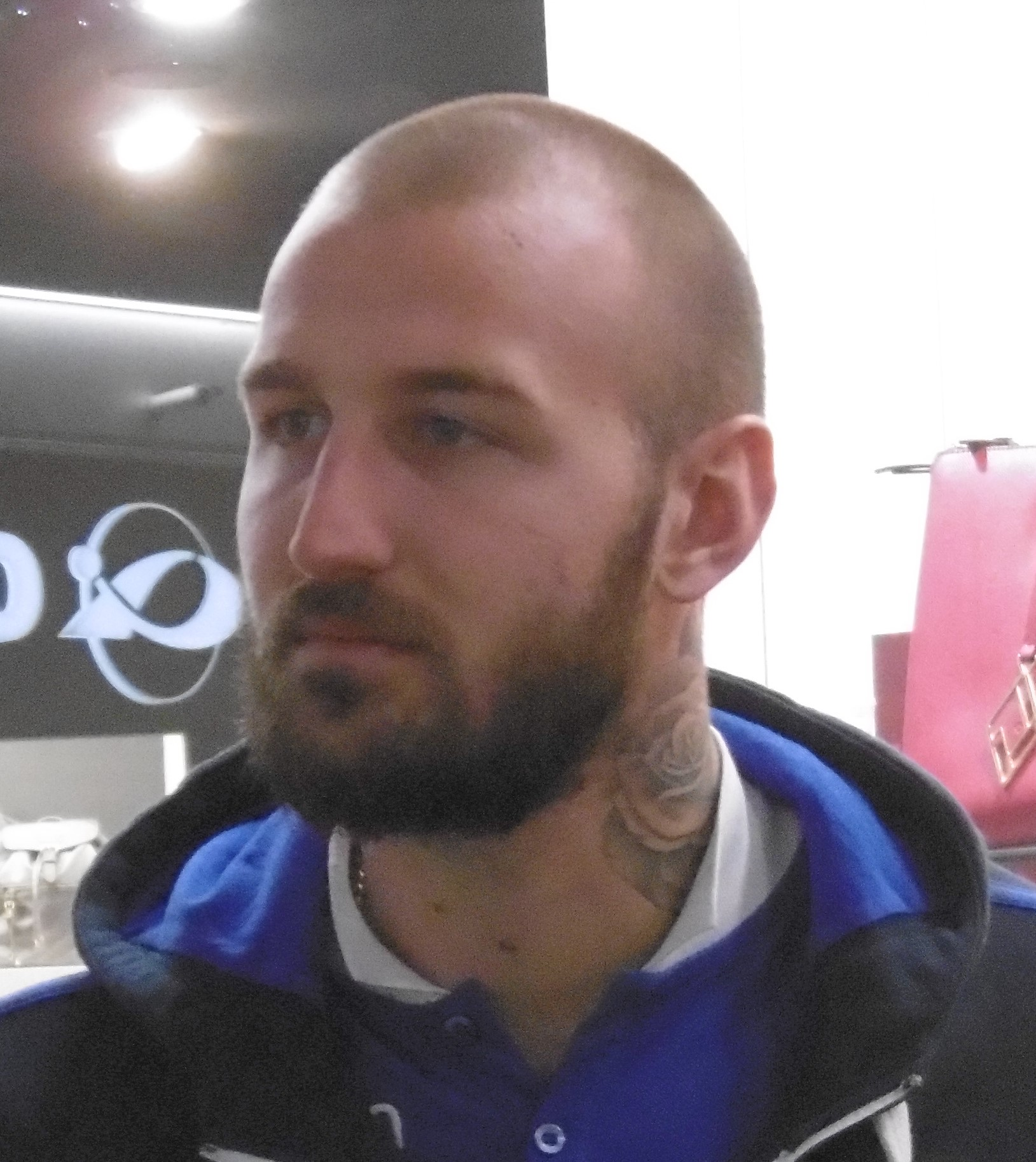
Milinković-Savić with SPAL in 2018

=== Vojvodina ===
On 2 April 2014, Milinković-Savić signed his first professional contract with Vojvodina, penning a three-year deal.

=== Manchester United ===
On 17 May 2014, it was announced that Premier League club Manchester United had reached an agreement with Vojvodina for the transfer of Milinković-Savić. Both clubs agreed that the player would stay with Vojvodina for another season on loan. The deal was completed on 5 August, for a transfer fee of €1.75 million.

==== Loan to Vojvodina ====
Milinković-Savić made his competitive debut for Vojvodina on 10 August, keeping a clean sheet in a 3–0 home league victory over OFK Beograd. He played the full 90 minutes in all 15 league games in the first part of the 2014–15 season. After the winter break, Milinković-Savić lost his place as first-choice goalkeeper to experienced Srđan Žakula, making only two more league appearances.

=== Lechia Gdańsk ===
After failing to obtain a work permit to play in England, Milinković-Savić was released by United in November 2015 and he signed a four-and-a-half-year contract with Ekstraklasa club Lechia Gdańsk on 26 November; the contract commenced on 1 January 2016.

=== Torino ===
On 30 January 2017, Serie A club Torino announced they had purchased him and he would join the club on 1 July. He was the first-choice goalkeeper for the national cup, while being the second choice, behind Salvatore Sirigu, in the league. During the Coppa Italia match against Carpi, he hit the crossbar with a free-kick in injury time.

==== Loan to SPAL ====
On 6 July 2018, Milinković-Savić signed with SPAL on loan from Torino until 30 June 2019.

==== Loan to Ascoli ====
On 31 January 2019, Milinković-Savić joined Serie B side Ascoli on loan until 30 June 2019.

==== Loan to Standard Liège ====
On 29 June 2019, he joined Belgian club Standard Liège on loan with an option to buy.

On 15 June 2021, Torino announced a contract extension until 30 June 2024.

==== Loan to Napoli ====
On 26 July 2025, Milinković-Savić was signed on loan by Napoli for the 2025–26 season, with a conditional obligation to buy set at €21 million, payable over four years.

== International career ==
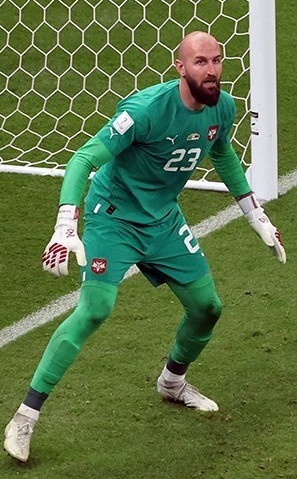
Milinković-Savić playing for Serbia at the 2022 FIFA World Cup

Milinković-Savić was selected to represent the Serbia U19 national team at the 2014 UEFA Under-19 Championship. He served as a backup to Predrag Rajković, failing to make an appearance at the tournament, as the team was eliminated by Portugal on penalties in the semi-finals of the competition.

Milinković-Savić again served as a backup to Rajković at the 2015 FIFA U-20 World Cup, where the Serbian team won the gold medal.

He made his debut for the senior national team on 11 November 2021 in a friendly against Qatar.

In November 2022, he was selected in Serbia's squad for the 2022 FIFA World Cup in Qatar. He played in all three group stage matches, against Brazil, Cameroon, and Switzerland. Serbia finished fourth in the group.

Milinković-Savić was selected in Serbia's squad for the UEFA Euro 2024, but didn't make any appearances in the tournament.

== Personal life ==
Milinković-Savić was born in Ourense, Galicia, Spain, to parents Nikola Milinković, who was a former professional footballer, and Milana Savić, a professional basketball player. He is the younger brother of Sergej Milinković-Savić, who plays as a midfielder for Saudi Pro League club Al Hilal.

== Career statistics ==
=== Club ===
As of match played 21 November 2026

Appearances and goals by club, season and competition
Club	Season	League			National cup (Note: Includes Serbian Cup, Coppa Italia)		Europe		Other		Total	
Club	Season	Division	Apps	Goals	Apps	Goals	Apps	Goals	Apps	Goals	Apps	Goals
Vojvodina (loan)	2014–15	Serbian SuperLiga	17	0	2	0	0	0	—		19	0
Lechia Gdańsk	2015–16	Ekstraklasa	11	0	0	0	—		—		11	0
Lechia Gdańsk	2016–17	Ekstraklasa	18	0	0	0	—		—		18	0
Lechia Gdańsk	Total		29	0	0	0	—		—		29	0
Torino	2017–18	Serie A	1	0	3	0	—		—		4	0
Torino	2020–21	Serie A	5	0	3	0	—		—		8	0
Torino	2021–22	Serie A	27	0	1	0	—		—		28	0
Torino	2022–23	Serie A	38	0	4	0	—		—		42	0
Torino	2023–24	Serie A	36	0	1	0	—		—		37	0
Torino	2024–25	Serie A	37	0	2	0	—		—		39	0
Torino	Total		144	0	14	0	—		—		158	0
SPAL (loan)	2018–19	Serie A	2	0	1	0	—		—		3	0
Ascoli (loan)	2018–19	Serie B	8	0	0	0	—		—		8	0
Standard Liège (loan)	2019–20	Belgian Pro League	0	0	0	0	3 (Note: Appearances in UEFA Europa League)	0	—		3	0
Napoli (loan)	2025–26	Serie A	27	0	2	0	7 (Note: Appearances in UEFA Champions League)	0	2 (Note: Appearances in Supercoppa Italiana)	0	38	0
Napoli	2026–27	Serie A	5	0	0	0	2	0	—		7	0
Napoli	Napoli total		32	0	2	0	9	0	2	0	45	0
Career total			232	0	18	0	12	0	2	0	265	0

=== International ===
As of match played 13 November 2026

Appearances and goals by national team and year
National team	Year	Apps	Goals
Serbia	2021	1	0
Serbia	2022	9	0
Serbia	2023	8	0
Serbia	2024	1	0
Serbia	2025	0	0
Serbia	2026	5	0
Total		24	0

== Honours ==
Napoli

- Supercoppa Italiana: 2025–26

Serbia U20

- FIFA U-20 World Cup: 2015

Individual

- Serie A Fair Play Moment of the Season: 2025–26
