= 2025–26 Supercoppa Italiana =

Tournament details
- Host country: Saudi Arabia
- Dates: 18–22 December 2025
- Teams: 4
- Venue: 1 (in 1 host city)

Final positions
- Champions: Napoli (3rd title)
- Runners-up: Bologna

Tournament statistics
- Matches played: 3
- Goals scored: 6 (2 per match)
- Attendance: 59,401 (19,800 per match)
- Top scorer: David Neres (3 goals)

The 2025–26 Supercoppa Italiana (branded as the EA SPORTS FC Supercup for sponsorship reasons) was the 38th edition of the Supercoppa Italiana.

2024–25 Serie A champions Napoli defeated 2024–25 Coppa Italia winners Bologna 2–0 in the final, securing their third Supercoppa Italiana title.

== Qualification ==
The tournament featured the winners and runners-up of the 2024–25 Serie A and 2024–25 Coppa Italia.

=== Qualified teams ===
The following four teams qualified for the tournament.

Team	Method of qualification	Appearance	Last appearance as	Years performance		
Team	Method of qualification	Appearance	Last appearance as	Winner(s)	Runners-up	Semi-finalists
Napoli	2024–25 Serie A champions	6th	2023–24 runners-up	2	3	1
Bologna	2024–25 Coppa Italia winners	1st	–	–	–	–
Inter Milan	2024–25 Serie A runners-up	14th	2024–25 runners-up	8	5	2
AC Milan	2024–25 Coppa Italia runners-up	14th	2024–25 winners	8	5	1

== Format ==
The competition featured two semi-finals to determine the two teams that then play in the final. All three matches were played as single-leg fixtures. Matches consisted of two periods of 45 minutes each. In the case of a draw, the matches were decided by a penalty shoot-out.

== Venue ==
The matches were played at the King Saud University Stadium in Riyadh, Saudi Arabia, marking the sixth time that the Supercoppa Italiana had been held in the Middle Eastern country.

Location of the host city of the 2025–26 Supercoppa Italiana.	City	Stadium
Location of the host city of the 2025–26 Supercoppa Italiana.	Riyadh	King Saud University Stadium
Location of the host city of the 2025–26 Supercoppa Italiana.	Capacity: 25,000	

== Matches ==
- Times listed are SAST (UTC+3).

=== Bracket ===
Semi-finals
18 December 2025 – Riyadh
Napoli	2
AC Milan	0
19 December 2025 – Riyadh
Bologna (p)	1 (3)
Inter Milan	1 (2)

Final
22 December 2025 – Riyadh
Napoli	2
Bologna	0

=== Semi-finals ===
18 December 2025
22:00

Napoli	2–0	AC Milan
Neres 39'; Højlund 64'	Report

King Saud University Stadium, Riyadh
Attendance: 24,941
Referee: Luca Zufferli

19 December 2025
22:00

Bologna	1–1	Inter Milan
Orsolini 35' (pen.)	Report	Thuram 2'
Penalties
Ferguson (penalty scored); Moro (penalty missed); Miranda (penalty missed); Rowe (penalty scored); Immobile (penalty scored)	3–2	(penalty scored) L. Martínez; (penalty missed) Bastoni; (penalty missed) Barella; (penalty missed) Bonny; (penalty scored) De Vrij

King Saud University Stadium, Riyadh
Attendance: 16,591
Referee: Daniele Chiffi

=== Final ===
22 December 2025
22:00

Napoli	2–0	Bologna
Neres 39', 57'	Report

King Saud University Stadium, Riyadh
Attendance: 17,869
Referee: Andrea Colombo
