= 2016–17 AC Milan season =

Milan
2016–17 season
- Honorary Chairman Chairman: Silvio Berlusconi (until 13 April 2017); Li Yonghong (from 13 April 2017)
- Head Coach: Vincenzo Montella
- Stadium: San Siro
- Serie A: 6th
- Coppa Italia: Quarter-finals
- Supercoppa Italiana: Winners
- Top goalscorer: League: Carlos Bacca (13); All: Carlos Bacca (14)
- Average home league attendance: 40,326
Home colours	Away colours	Third colours

The 2016–17 season was Associazione Calcio Milan's 83rd season in Serie A and 34th consecutive season in the top flight of Italian football. Milan competed in Serie A, the Supercoppa Italiana (as finalist of 2015–16 Coppa Italia) and the Coppa Italia.

== Players ==
=== Squad information ===
No.	Player	Nat.	Position(s)	Date of birth (age)	Signed in	Contract until	Signed from	Transfer fee	Notes
Goalkeepers
30	Marco Storari	(Italy)	GK	7 January 1977 (aged 40)	2017	2017	(Italy) Cagliari	Free	
35	Alessandro Plizzari	(Italy)	GK	12 March 2000 (aged 17)	2016	2018	(Italy) Milan Primavera	Free	From Youth system
99	Gianluigi Donnarumma	(Italy)	GK	25 February 1999 (aged 18)	2015	2018	(Italy) Milan Primavera	€250,000	From Youth system
Defenders
2	Mattia De Sciglio	(Italy)	RB / LB	20 October 1992 (aged 24)	2011	2018	(Italy) Milan Primavera	Free	From Youth system
13	Alessio Romagnoli	(Italy)	CB	12 January 1995 (aged 22)	2015	2020	(Italy) Roma	€25,000,000	
15	Gustavo Gómez	(Paraguay)	CB	6 May 1993 (aged 24)	2016	2021	(Argentina) Lanús	€8,500,000	
17	Cristián Zapata	(Colombia)	CB	30 September 1986 (aged 30)	2012	2019	(Spain) Villarreal	€6,000,000	
20	Ignazio Abate	(Italy)	RB	12 November 1986 (aged 30)	2009	2019	(Italy) Torino	€2,800,000	From Youth system
21	Leonel Vangioni	(Argentina)	LB	5 May 1987 (aged 30)	2016	2019	(Argentina) River Plate	Free	
29	Gabriel Paletta	(Italy)	CB	15 February 1986 (aged 31)	2015	2018	(Italy) Parma	€880,000	
31	Luca Antonelli	(Italy)	LB	11 February 1987 (aged 30)	2015	2019	(Italy) Genoa	€4,500,000	From Youth system
96	Davide Calabria	(Italy)	RB / LB	6 December 1996 (aged 20)	2015	2020	(Italy) Milan Primavera	Free	From Youth system
Midfielders
5	Giacomo Bonaventura	(Italy)	CM / LW	22 August 1989 (aged 27)	2014	2020	(Italy) Atalanta	€7,000,000	
14	Matías Fernández	(Chile)	CM	15 May 1986 (aged 31)	2016	2017	(Italy) Fiorentina	On loan	
16	Andrea Poli	(Italy)	CM	29 September 1989 (aged 27)	2013	2018	(Italy) Sampdoria	€9,700,000	
18	Riccardo Montolivo	(Italy)	DM / CM	18 January 1985 (aged 32)	2012	2019	(Italy) Fiorentina	Free	Captain
23	José Sosa	(Argentina)	DM / CM	19 June 1985 (aged 32)	2016	2018	(Turkey) Beşiktaş	€7,500,000	
33	Juraj Kucka	(Slovakia)	CM	26 February 1987 (aged 30)	2015	2019	(Italy) Genoa	€3,000,000	
73	Manuel Locatelli	(Italy)	DM / CM	8 January 1998 (aged 19)	2016	2018	(Italy) Milan Primavera	Free	From Youth system
80	Mario Pašalić	(Croatia)	CM	9 February 1995 (aged 22)	2016	2017	(England) Chelsea	On loan	
91	Andrea Bertolacci	(Italy)	CM	11 January 1991 (aged 26)	2015	2019	(Italy) Roma	€20,000,000	
Forwards
7	Gerard Deulofeu	(Spain)	LW / RW	13 March 1994 (aged 23)	2017	2017	(England) Everton	On loan	
8	Suso	(Spain)	RW	19 November 1993 (aged 23)	2015	2019	(England) Liverpool	€1,300,000	
9	Gianluca Lapadula	(Italy)	ST	7 February 1990 (aged 27)	2016	2021	(Italy) Pescara	€9,000,000	
10	Keisuke Honda	(Japan)	RW	13 June 1986 (aged 31)	2014	2017	(Russia) CSKA Moscow	Free	
11	Lucas Ocampos	(Argentina)	LW	11 July 1994 (aged 22)	2017	2017	(France) Marseille	On loan	
63	Patrick Cutrone	(Italy)	ST	3 January 1998 (aged 19)	2017	2018	(Italy) Milan Primavera	Free	From Youth system
70	Carlos Bacca	(Colombia)	ST	8 September 1986 (aged 30)	2015	2019	(Spain) Sevilla	€30,000,000	

== Transfers ==
=== Summer window ===
==== In ====
Date	Pos.	Player	Age	Moving from	Fee	Notes	Source
24 June 2016	FW	(Italy) Gianluca Lapadula	26	(Italy) Pescara	€9,000,000		
1 July 2016	DF	(Argentina) Leonel Vangioni	29	(Argentina) River Plate	Free		
18 July 2016	GK	(Italy) Alessandro Plizzari	16	Promoted from Youth	Free		
5 August 2016	DF	(Paraguay) Gustavo Gómez	23	(Argentina) Lanús	€8,500,000		
17 August 2016	MF	(Argentina) José Sosa	31	(Turkey) Beşiktaş	€7,500,000		

==== On loan ====
Date	Pos.	Player	Age	Moving from	Fee	Notes	Source
27 August 2016	MF	(Croatia) Mario Pašalić	21	(England) Chelsea	€200,000		
31 August 2016	MF	(Chile) Matías Fernández	30	(Italy) Fiorentina	€800,000	With option to buy	

==== Loan returns ====
Date	Pos.	Player	Age	Moving from	Fee	Notes	Source
1 July 2016	GK	(Brazil) Gabriel	23	(Italy) Napoli	Free		
1 July 2016	DF	(Italy) Giorgio Altare	17	(Italy) Virtus Bergamo	Free	Re-joined Primavera squad	
1 July 2016	DF	(Italy) Gabriel Paletta	30	(Italy) Atalanta	Free		
1 July 2016	FW	(Spain) Suso	22	(Italy) Genoa	Free		

Total spending: ▼€26M

==== Out ====
Date	Pos.	Player	Age	Moving to	Fee	Notes	Source
22 May 2016	GK	(Italy) Christian Abbiati	38	Unattached	Free	Retired	
21 June 2016	FW	(Italy) Stephan El Shaarawy	23	(Italy) Roma	€13,000,000	Buy option exercised	
1 July 2016	DF	(Brazil) Alex	34	Unattached	Free	End of contract	
1 July 2016	DF	(France) Philippe Mexès	34	Unattached	Free	End of contract	
1 July 2016	MF	(Ghana) Kevin-Prince Boateng	29	(Spain) Las Palmas	Free	End of contract	
1 July 2016	FW	(Spain) Fernando Torres	32	(Spain) Atlético Madrid	Free	From loan to definitive acquisition	
1 July 2016	DF	(Italy) Guido Turano	19	(Italy) FeralpiSalò	Undisclosed	From Primavera squad	
1 July 2016	GK	(Italy) Francesco Cancelli	18	(Italy) Grosseto	Undisclosed	From Primavera squad	
1 July 2016	DF	(Italy) Francesco Bordi	19	(Italy) Siena	Free	From Primavera squad	
6 July 2016	GK	(Italy) Luca Crosta	18	(Italy) Cagliari	Undisclosed	From Primavera squad	
7 July 2016	MF	(Bolivia) Sebastián Gamarra	19	(Italy) FeralpiSalò	Undisclosed	From Primavera squad	
7 July 2016	FW	(Italy) Andrea Vassallo	18	(Italy) Bologna	Free	From Primavera squad	
8 July 2016	AM	(Italy) Simone Verdi	23	(Italy) Bologna	€1,500,000	After return from loan	
13 July 2016	DF	(Italy) Christian Maldini	20	(Italy) Reggiana	Free	From Primavera squad	
15 July 2016	FW	(Italy) Gianmario Comi	24	(Italy) Carpi	Undisclosed	After return from loan	
15 July 2016	DF	(Italy) Giorgio Piacentini	19	(Italy) Como	Undisclosed	From Primavera squad	
18 July 2016	DF	(Italy) Claudio Bonanni	19	(Italy) Varese	Undisclosed	From Primavera squad	
18 July 2016	GK	(Italy) Michael Agazzi	32	(Italy) Cesena	Undisclosed	After return from loan	
18 July 2016	FW	(Italy) Matteo Chinellato	24	(Italy) Como	Free	After return from loan	
31 July 2016	FW	(France) Jérémy Ménez	29	(France) Bordeaux	Free		
3 August 2016	MF	(Italy) Alessandro Mastalli	20	(Italy) Juve Stabia	Undisclosed		
4 August 2016	DF	(Italy) Andrea Malberti	18	(Italy) Novara	Undisclosed	From Primavera squad	
16 August 2016	GK	(Italy) Alessandro Livieri	19	(Italy) FeralpiSalò	Undisclosed	From Primavera squad	
16 August 2016	FW	(Italy) Alessandro Matri	31	(Italy) Sassuolo	Free	After return from loan	
18 August 2016	DF	(Italy) Davide Mondonico	19	(Italy) AlbinoLeffe	Undisclosed	From Primavera squad	
2 September 2016	FW	(Italy) Andrea Casiraghi	19	(Italy) Pro Patria	Free	From Primavera squad	
18 September 2016	MF	(Nigeria) Favour Aniekan	22	Unattached	Free	After return from loan	

==== Loans ended ====
Date	Pos.	Player	Age	Moving to	Fee	Notes	Source
1 July 2016	FW	(Italy) Mario Balotelli	25	(England) Liverpool	Free		

==== Out on loan ====
Date	Pos.	Player	Age	Moving to	Fee	Notes	Source
7 July 2016	DF	(Czech Republic) Stefan Simić	21	(Belgium) Mouscron	Free	Buy option included	
13 July 2016	MF	(Italy) Gian Filippo Felicioli	18	(Italy) Ascoli	Free	Buy & buy-back options included	
14 July 2016	FW	(Morocco) Hachim Mastour	18	(Netherlands) PEC Zwolle	Free	After return from loan	
15 July 2016	MF	(Italy) Matteo Pessina	19	(Italy) Como	Free	After return from loan	
15 July 2016	MF	(Bosnia and Herzegovina) Andrej Modić	20	(Italy) Brescia	Free	After return from loan	
15 July 2016	FW	(Italy) Gianmarco Zigoni	24	(Italy) SPAL	Free	Loan confirmed	
18 July 2016	FW	(Italy) Giovanni Crociata	18	(Italy) Brescia	Free	Buy option included	
18 July 2016	FW	(Italy) Davide Di Molfetta	20	(Italy) Prato	Free	After return from loan	
10 August 2016	DF	(Senegal) Ameth Lo	19	(Italy) Reggina	Free	From Primavera squad	
10 August 2016	FW	(Italy) Andrea Bianchimano	19	(Italy) Reggina	Free	From Primavera squad	
22 August 2016	DF	(Italy) Ivan De Santis	19	(Italy) Catania	Free	From Primavera squad	
25 August 2016	FW	(Italy) Giacomo Beretta	24	(Italy) Virtus Entella	Free	After return from loan	
30 August 2016	MF	(Italy) José Mauri	20	(Italy) Empoli	Free		
31 August 2016	DF	(Colombia) Jherson Vergara	22	(Russia) Arsenal Tula	Free	After return from loan	
31 August 2016	GK	(Spain) Diego López	34	(Spain) Espanyol	Free		
7 September 2016	MF	(Argentina) Juan Mauri	27	(Italy) Paganese	Free	After return from loan	

Total income: ▲€14,500,000
Net income: ▼€11,500,000

=== Winter window ===
==== In ====
Date	Pos.	Player	Age	Moving from	Fee	Notes	Source
10 January 2017	GK	(Italy) Marco Storari	40	(Italy) Cagliari	Free		
17 January 2017	FW	(Italy) Patrick Cutrone	19	Promoted from youth team	Free		
1 February 2017	MF	(Italy) Mattia El Hilali	19	A.C. Milan Primavera	Free	Signed a 3-year contract extension	

==== On loan ====
Date	Pos.	Player	Age	Moving from	Fee	Notes	Source
23 January 2017	FW	(Spain) Gerard Deulofeu	22	(England) Everton	€750,000	With option to buy	
30 January 2017	FW	(Argentina) Lucas Ocampos	22	(France) Marseille	Undisclosed	Previously at (Italy) Genoa	

==== Loan returns ====
Date	Pos.	Player	Age	Moving from	Fee	Notes	Source
1 January 2017	FW	(Nigeria) Nnamdi Oduamadi	26	(Finland) HJK	Free		

Total spending: ▼€0,75 M

==== Out ====
Date	Pos.	Player	Age	Moving to	Fee	Notes	Source
16 January 2017	FW	(Brazil) Luiz Adriano	29	(Russia) Spartak Moscow	Undisclosed		

==== Out on loan ====
Date	Pos.	Player	Age	Moving to	Fee	Notes	Source
10 January 2017	GK	(Brazil) Gabriel	24	(Italy) Cagliari	Free		
18 January 2017	FW	(Italy) Giacomo Beretta	24	(Italy) Carpi	Free	After return from loan	
26 January 2017	FW	(France) M'Baye Niang	22	(England) Watford	€500,000	With option to buy	
27 January 2017	DF	(Italy) Ivan De Santis	19	(Italy) Paganese	Free	After return from loan	
30 January 2017	FW	(Italy) Luca Vido	19	(Italy) Cittadella	Free	With option to buy & buyback	
30 January 2017	DF	(Brazil) (Italy) Rodrigo Ely	23	(Spain) Deportivo Alavés	Free		

Total income: ▲€500,000
Net income: ▼€250,000

== Pre-season and friendlies ==
16 July 2016 Friendly	Bordeaux	1–2	Milan	Stade Armandie, Agen
20:00 CDT	Malcom 78'	Report	Suso 28', 38'

27 July 2016 2016 ICC	Bayern Munich	3–3 (3–5 p)	Milan	Soldier Field, Chicago
20:00 CDT	Ribéry 29', 90' (pen.); Alaba 38'	Report	Niang 23' Bertolacci 49' Kucka 61'	Referee: Mark Geiger (United States)
	Penalties
	Lahm (penalty scored); Alaba (penalty scored); Bernat (penalty scored); Rafinha (penalty missed)		(penalty scored) Honda; (penalty scored) Matri; (penalty scored) Kucka; (penalty scored) Romagnoli; (penalty scored) Bonaventura

30 July 2016 2016 ICC	Liverpool	2–0	Milan	Levi's Stadium, Santa Clara, California
19:00 PDT	Origi 59'; Firmino 73'	Report		Referee: Kevin Stott

3 August 2016 2016 ICC	Milan	1–3	Chelsea	U.S. Bank Stadium, Minneapolis
20:00 CDT	Bonaventura 38'	Report	Traoré 24'; Oscar 70' (pen.), 87'

10 August 2016 TIM Trophy	Milan	0–0 (4–2 p)	Celta Vigo	Reggio Emilia, Italy
				Stadium: Mapei Stadium – Città del Tricolore
	Penalties
	(penalty scored) Bacca; (penalty scored) Niang; (penalty scored) Montolivo; (penalty missed) Honda; (penalty scored) Bonaventura		(penalty missed) Aspas; (penalty missed) Wass; (penalty scored) Díaz; (penalty scored) Sisto
Note: 45-minute match

10 August 2016 TIM Trophy	Sassuolo	3–2	Milan	Reggio Emilia, Italy
	Falcinelli 18'; Politano 32'; Trotta 40'		Niang 2' (pen.), 10'	Stadium: Mapei Stadium – Città del Tricolore
Note: 45-minute match

14 August 2016 Friendly	SC Freiburg	0–2	Milan	Schwarzwald-Stadion, Freiburg
16:30 CEST		Report	Luiz Adriano 39', 44'	Attendance: 25,000; Referee: Matthias Jollenbeck

3 September 2016 Friendly	AFC Bournemouth	1–2	Milan	Dean Court, Bournemouth
17:00 CEST	Mousset 66'	Report	Suso 64'; Niang 67' (pen.)	Referee: James Linington

8 October 2016 Friendly	Chiasso	0–5	Milan	Stadio Riva IV, Chiasso
16:00 CEST		Report	Lapadula 7', 20'; Poli 13'; Niang 18'; Luiz Adriano 29'	Referee: Vladimir Ovcharov

== Competitions ==
=== Overall ===
Competition	Started round	Final position	First match	Last match
Serie A	Matchday 1	6th	21 August 2016	28 May 2017
Coppa Italia	Round of 16	Quarter-finals	12 January 2017	25 January 2017
Supercoppa Italiana	Final	Winners	23 December 2016	

Last updated: 28 May 2017

=== Serie A ===
==== League table ====
Pos	Team	Pld	W	D	L	GF	GA	GD	Pts	Qualification or relegation
4	Atalanta	38	21	9	8	62	41	+21	72	Qualification for the Europa League group stage (Note: Since the winners of the 2016–17 Coppa Italia, Juventus, qualified for European competition based on league position, the spot awarded to the cup winners (Europa League group stage) was passed to the fifth-placed team and the spot awarded to the fifth-placed team (Europa League third qualifying round) was passed to the sixth-placed team.)
5	Lazio	38	21	7	10	74	51	+23	70	Qualification for the Europa League group stage
6	Milan	38	18	9	11	57	45	+12	63	Qualification for the Europa League third qualifying round
7	Internazionale	38	19	5	14	72	49	+23	62	
8	Fiorentina	38	16	12	10	63	57	+6	60	

Source: Serie A, Soccerway
Rules for classification: 1) Points; 2) Head-to-head points; 3) Head-to-head goal difference; 4) Goal difference; 5) Goals scored; 6) Draw.

==== Results summary ====
Overall								Home						Away					
Pld	W	D	L	GF	GA	GD	Pts	W	D	L	GF	GA	GD	W	D	L	GF	GA	GD
38	18	9	11	57	45	+12	63	12	2	5	32	20	+12	6	7	6	25	25	0

Last updated: 28 May 2017.
Source: Competitive matches

==== Results by round ====
Round	1	2	3	4	5	6	7	8	9	10	11	12	13	14	15	16	17	18	19	20	21	22	23	24	25	26	27	28	29	30	31	32	33	34	35	36	37	38
Ground	H	A	H	A	H	A	H	A	H	A	H	A	H	A	H	A	H	A	H	A	H	A	H	A	H	A	H	A	H	A	H	A	H	A	H	A	H	A
Result	W	L	L	W	W	D	W	W	W	L	W	W	D	W	W	L	D	W	W	D	L	L	L	D	W	W	W	L	W	D	W	D	L	D	L	D	W	L
Position	5	11	15	10	6	6	6	3	3	4	3	3	3	3	3	3	5	5	5	5	7	7	7	7	7	7	7	7	7	7	6	6	6	6	6	6	6	6

Updated to match(es) played on 28 May 2017. Source: Competitive matches
A = Away; H = Home; W = Win; D = Draw; L = Loss

==== Matches ====
21 August 2016 1	Milan	3–2	Torino	Milan
18:00 CEST	Bacca 38', 50', 62' (pen.); Paletta (yellow card) 45' (yellow-red card) 90+4'	Report	Martínez (yellow card) 26'; Rossettini (yellow card) 35'; Belotti 48'; Obi (yellow card) 61'; Baselli 90+1'	Stadium: San Siro; Attendance: 32,254; Referee: Antonio Damato

27 August 2016 2	Napoli	4–2	Milan	Naples
20:45 CEST	Milik 18', 33'; Koulibaly (yellow card) 55'; Hysaj (yellow card) 70'; Callejón 74', 90+4'; Jorginho (yellow card) 85'; Albiol (yellow card) 86'; Zieliński (yellow card) 90'	Report	Niang 51', (yellow card) 53' (yellow-red card) 88'; Suso 55', (yellow card) 66'; Gómez (yellow card) 61'; Kucka (red card) 75'; Romagnoli (yellow card) 90+4'	Stadium: Stadio San Paolo; Attendance: 27,231; Referee: Paolo Valeri

11 September 2016 3	Milan	0–1	Udinese	Milan
15:00 CEST	Bacca (yellow card) 29'	Report	Felipe (yellow card) 34'; Badu (yellow card) 63'; Perica (yellow card) 73', (goal) 88'; De Paul (yellow card) 74'; Armero (yellow card) 90+4'	Stadium: San Siro; Attendance: 28,303; Referee: Gianpaolo Calvarese

16 September 2016 4	Sampdoria	0–1	Milan	Genoa
20:45 CEST	Pereira (yellow card) 71'; Muriel (yellow card) 84'	Report	Lapadula (yellow card) 39'; Bonaventura (yellow card) 47'; Bacca 85'; Donnarumma (yellow card) 90+6'	Stadium: Stadio Luigi Ferraris; Attendance: 19,708; Referee: Massimiliano Irrati

20 September 2016 5	Milan	2–0	Lazio	Milan
20:45 CEST	Bacca 37'; Calabria (yellow card) 62'; Niang 74' (pen.)	Report	Bastos (yellow card) 45+1'; Cataldi (yellow card) 59'; Radu (yellow card) 73'; De Vrij (yellow card) 76'	Stadium: San Siro; Attendance: 26,464; Referee: Davide Massa

25 September 2016 6	Fiorentina	0–0	Milan	Florence
20:45 CEST	Rodríguez (yellow card) 3'; Milić (yellow card) 90+1'	Report	Calabria (yellow card) 23'; Montolivo (yellow card) 45'; Locatelli (yellow card) 80'; Antonelli (yellow card) 90+6'	Stadium: Stadio Artemio Franchi; Attendance: 29,786; Referee: Daniele Orsato

2 October 2016 7	Milan	4–3	Sassuolo	Milan
18:00 CEST	Bonaventura 9'; Montolivo (yellow card) 51'; Bacca 69' (pen.); Locatelli 73'; Paletta 77'	Report	Politano 10', (yellow card) 90+1'; Adjapong (yellow card) 23'; Acerbi 54'; Pellegrini 56', (yellow card) 76'; Antei (yellow card) 68'; Biondini (yellow card) 90+3'	Stadium: San Siro; Attendance: 31,738; Referee: Marco Guida

16 October 2016 8	Chievo	1–3	Milan	Verona
20:45 CEST	Dainelli (yellow card) 14'; Birsa 76'; Meggiorini (yellow card) 78'; Cacciatore (yellow card) 90+1'	Report	Locatelli (yellow card) 35'; Kucka 45'; Niang 46'; Paletta (yellow card) 75'; Dainelli 90+4' (o.g.)	Stadium: Stadio Marc'Antonio Bentegodi; Attendance: 24,000; Referee: Gianluca Rocchi

22 October 2016 9	Milan	1–0	Juventus	Milan
20:45 CEST	Kucka (yellow card) 44'; Donnarumma (yellow card) 50'; Locatelli 65', (yellow card) 79'; Poli (yellow card) 83'	Report	Bonucci (yellow card) 30'; Pjanić (yellow card) 38'; Alves (yellow card) 76'	Stadium: San Siro; Attendance: 75,829; Referee: Nicola Rizzoli

25 October 2016 10	Genoa	3–0	Milan	Genoa
20:45 CEST	Ninković 11'; Izzo (yellow card) 40'; Pavoletti (yellow card) 74', (goal) 86'; Kucka 80' (o.g.); Veloso (yellow card) 85'	Report	Paletta (red card) 56'	Stadium: Stadio Luigi Ferraris; Attendance: 21,248; Referee: Luca Banti

30 October 2016 11	Milan	1–0	Pescara	Milan
15:00 CET	Abate (yellow card) 41'; Bonaventura 49'	Report	Brugman (yellow card) 37'; Mitriță (yellow card) 48'	Stadium: San Siro; Attendance: 36,535; Referee: Daniele Doveri

6 November 2016 12	Palermo	1–2	Milan	Palermo
15:00 CET	Cionek (yellow card) 64'; Nestorovski 71'; Diamanti (yellow card) 89'	Report	Suso 15'; De Sciglio (yellow card) 26'; Lapadula 82'	Stadium: Stadio Renzo Barbera; Attendance: 13,545; Referee: Paolo Mazzoleni

20 November 2016 13	Milan	2–2	Inter	Milan
20:45 CET	Kucka (yellow card) 22'; De Sciglio (yellow card) 32'; Suso 42', 58'	Report	Kondogbia (yellow card) 19'; Ansaldi (yellow card) 49'; Candreva 53'; Jovetić (yellow card) 78'; Perišić 90+2', (yellow card) 90+3'	Stadium: San Siro; Attendance: 77,882; Referee: Paolo Tagliavento

26 November 2016 14	Empoli	1–4	Milan	Empoli
20:45 CET	Saponara 17'; Krunić (yellow card) 37'; Bellusci (yellow card) 89'	Report	Romagnoli (yellow card) 4'; Lapadula 15', 77'; Kucka (yellow card) 31'; Bonaventura (yellow card) 43'; Suso 61'; Costa 64' (o.g.)	Stadium: Stadio Carlo Castellani; Attendance: 12,577; Referee: Gianpaolo Calvarese

4 December 2016 15	Milan	2–1	Crotone	Milan
12:30 CET	Pašalić 41'; Locatelli (yellow card) 49'; Sosa (yellow card) 63'; Lapadula 86', (yellow card) 87'; Kucka (yellow card) 90+2'	Report	Falcinelli 26'; Rosi (yellow card) 43'; Crisetig (yellow card) 53'; Rohdén (yellow card) 60'; Stoian (yellow card) 67'	Stadium: San Siro; Attendance: 37,294; Referee: Marco Di Bello

12 December 2016 16	Roma	1–0	Milan	Rome
21:00 CET	Nainggolan 62'; Rüdiger (yellow card) 84'	Report	Pašalić (yellow card) 18'; Paletta (yellow card) 79'	Stadium: Stadio Olimpico; Attendance: 41,841; Referee: Paolo Mazzoleni

17 December 2016 17	Milan	0–0	Atalanta	Milan
18:00 CET	Bonaventura (yellow card) 26'; Bertolacci (yellow card) 64'; Pašalić (yellow card) 74'	Report	Spinazzola (yellow card) 25'; Masiello (yellow card) 36'; Conti (yellow card) 79'; Petagna (yellow card) 86'; Gómez (yellow card) 90+1'; Sportiello (yellow card) 90+4'	Stadium: San Siro; Attendance: 35,584; Referee: Davide Massa

8 January 2017 19	Milan	1–0	Cagliari	Milan
18:00 CET	Bacca 88'	Report	Isla (yellow card) 89'; Alves (red card) 90+4'	Stadium: San Siro; Attendance: 31,113; Referee: Piero Giacomelli

16 January 2017 20	Torino	2–2	Milan	Turin
20:45 CET	Belotti 21', (yellow card) 50'; Benassi 26'; Moretti (yellow card) 40'; Obi (yellow card) 57'; Rossettini (yellow card) 59'; Falque (yellow card) 79'	Report	Locatelli (yellow card) 25'; Romagnoli (yellow card) 45' (yellow-red card) 89'; Bertolacci 55'; Bacca 60' (pen.)	Stadium: Stadio Olimpico Grande Torino; Attendance: 22,418; Referee: Paolo Tagliavento

21 January 2017 21	Milan	1–2	Napoli	Milan
20:45 CET	Calabria (yellow card) 22'; Sosa (yellow card) 26'; Kucka 37'; Gómez (yellow card) 51'; Bacca (yellow card) 56'	Report	Insigne 6'; Callejón 9', (yellow card) 82'; Mertens (yellow card) 12'; Strinić (yellow card) 38'; Tonelli (yellow card) 45+1'	Stadium: San Siro; Attendance: 54,257; Referee: Gianluca Rocchi

29 January 2017 22	Udinese	2–1	Milan	Udine
15:00 CET	Théréau 31'; Samir (yellow card) 62'; De Paul (yellow card) 71', (goal) 73'; Angella (yellow card) 82'	Report	Bonaventura 8'; Pašalić (yellow card) 45+4'; Romagnoli (yellow card) 55'	Stadium: Stadio Friuli; Attendance: 25,155; Referee: Luca Banti

5 February 2017 23	Milan	0–1	Sampdoria	Milan
12:30 CET	Bacca (yellow card) 45'; Suso (yellow card) 60'; Kucka (yellow card) 63'; Sosa (yellow card) 85' (yellow-red card) 90'	Report	Torreira (yellow card) 28'; Muriel 70' (pen.); Đuričić (yellow card) 90+4'	Stadium: San Siro; Attendance: 31,974; Referee: Marco Guida

8 February 2017 18	Bologna	0–1	Milan	Bologna
20:45 CET	Mbaye (yellow card) 18'; Gastaldello (yellow card) 45'; Verdi (yellow card) 47'; Nagy (yellow card) 90+2'; Džemaili (yellow card) 90+5'	Report	Paletta (yellow card) 18' (yellow-red card) 37'; Abate (yellow card) 23'; Kucka (yellow card) 53' (yellow-red card) 59'; Vangioni (yellow card) 71'; Pašalić 89'	Stadium: Stadio Renato Dall'Ara; Attendance: 23,863; Referee: Daniele Doveri
Note: The match was originally scheduled for 22 December 2016, but was postponed due to a scheduling conflict with 2016 Supercoppa Italiana.

13 February 2017 24	Lazio	1–1	Milan	Rome
20:45 CET	Biglia 45+1'; Radu (yellow card) 63'; Milinković-Savić (yellow card) 89'	Report	Vangioni (yellow card) 24'; Fernández (yellow card) 81'; Suso 85'	Stadium: Stadio Olimpico; Attendance: 25,000; Referee: Antonio Damato

19 February 2017 25	Milan	2–1	Fiorentina	Milan
20:45 CET	Kucka 16'; Deulofeu 31'; Vangioni (yellow card) 45+1'; Gómez (yellow card) 51'; Suso (yellow card) 74'	Report	Kalinić 20'; Salcedo (yellow card) 44'; Vecino (yellow card) 52'	Stadium: San Siro; Attendance: 32,743; Referee: Paolo Valeri

26 February 2017 26	Sassuolo	0–1	Milan	Sassuolo
15:00 CET	Berardi (yellow card) 8'; Aquilani (yellow card) 21'; Defrel (yellow card) 24'; Peluso (yellow card) 25'; Pellegrini (yellow card) 58'; Duncan (yellow card) 90+3'	Report	Kucka (yellow card) 11'; Bacca 22' (pen.); Sosa (yellow card) 30'; Bertolacci (yellow card) 38'	Stadium: Mapei Stadium – Città del Tricolore; Attendance: 18,842; Referee: Gianpaolo Calvarese

4 March 2017 27	Milan	3–1	Chievo	Milan
20:45 CET	Bacca 24', 70'; Deulofeu (yellow card) 33'; Lapadula 82' (pen.); Ocampos (yellow card) 90+2'	Report	de Guzmán 42' (pen.); Cesar (yellow card) 45+2'	Stadium: San Siro; Attendance: 27,357; Referee: Fabio Maresca

10 March 2017 28	Juventus	2–1	Milan	Turin
20:45 CET	Benatia 30', (yellow card) 36'; Pjanić (yellow card) 78'; Khedira (yellow card) 87'; Dybala 90+7' (pen.)	Report	Pašalić (yellow card) 23'; Deulofeu (yellow card) 39'; Bacca 43'; Ocampos (yellow card) 57'; Romagnoli (yellow card) 62'; Sosa (yellow card) 89' (yellow-red card) 90+3'	Stadium: Juventus Stadium; Attendance: 40,573; Referee: Davide Massa

18 March 2017 29	Milan	1–0	Genoa	Milan
20:45 CET	Fernández 33'; De Sciglio (yellow card) 78'	Report	Cataldi (yellow card) 36'; Gentiletti (yellow card) 90+2'	Stadium: San Siro; Attendance: 34,851; Referee: Carmine Russo

2 April 2017 30	Pescara	1–1	Milan	Pescara
15:00 CEST	Paletta 12' (o.g.); Biraghi (yellow card) 25'; Bovo (yellow card) 52'; Coulibaly (yellow card) 62'; Memushaj (yellow card) 75'; Bruno (yellow card) 85'	Report	Pašalić 41'; Paletta (yellow card) 58'; Sosa (yellow card) 63'; Locatelli (yellow card) 78'	Stadium: Stadio Adriatico – Giovanni Cornacchia; Attendance: 19,809; Referee: Paolo Silvio Mazzoleni

9 April 2017 31	Milan	4–0	Palermo	Milan
15:00 CEST	Suso 6'; Pašalić 19', (yellow card) 20'; Bacca 37'; Deulofeu 70'	Report	Goldaniga (yellow card) 5'; González (yellow card) 22' (yellow-red card) 83'; Cionek (yellow card) 75'	Stadium: San Siro; Attendance: 36,808; Referee: Marco Di Bello

15 April 2017 32	Inter	2–2	Milan	Milan
12:30 CEST	Candreva 36', (yellow card) 37'; Icardi 44'; Handanović (yellow card) 87'; Gagliardini (yellow card) 90+3'	Report	Kucka (yellow card) 34'; Romagnoli 83'; Locatelli (yellow card) 90+5'; Zapata 90+7'	Stadium: San Siro; Attendance: 78,328; Referee: Daniele Orsato

23 April 2017 33	Milan	1–2	Empoli	Milan
15:00 CEST	Sosa (yellow card) 21'; De Sciglio (yellow card) 48'; Lapadula 72', (yellow card) 82'	Report	Mchedlidze 40'; Thiam (yellow card) 56', (goal) 67'; Tello (yellow card) 82'; El Kaddouri (yellow card) 89'; Bellusci (yellow card) 90+6'	Stadium: San Siro; Attendance: 39,529; Referee: Claudio Gavillucci

30 April 2017 34	Crotone	1–1	Milan	Crotone
15:00 CEST	Trotta 8'; Ferrari (yellow card) 20'; Crisetig (yellow card) 26'; Falcinelli (yellow card) 90+4'	Report	Kucka (yellow card) 24' (yellow-red card) 90+6'; Deulofeu (yellow card) 43'; Paletta 50'	Stadium: Stadio Ezio Scida; Attendance: 14,518; Referee: Luca Banti

7 May 2017 35	Milan	1–4	Roma	Milan
20:45 CEST	Vangioni (yellow card) 48'; Lapadula (yellow card) 59'; Bertolacci (yellow card) 63'; Pašalić 76'; Ocampos (yellow card) 77'; Paletta (red card) 86'	Report	Džeko 8', 28'; Manolas (yellow card) 64'; El Shaarawy 78'; De Rossi 87' (pen.)	Stadium: San Siro; Attendance: 54,022; Referee: Nicola Rizzoli

13 May 2017 36	Atalanta	1–1	Milan	Bergamo
20:45 CEST	Toloi (yellow card) 35'; Conti 44', (yellow card) 45'	Report	Suso (yellow card) 51'; Deulofeu 87'	Stadium: Stadio Atleti Azzurri d'Italia; Attendance: 19,656; Referee: Gianluca Rocchi

21 May 2017 37	Milan	3–0	Bologna	Milan
15:00 CEST	Deulofeu 69', (yellow card) 70'; Honda 73'; Lapadula 90+1'; Cutrone (yellow card) 90+2'	Report	Helander (yellow card) 6'; Gastaldello (yellow card) 72'	Stadium: San Siro; Attendance: 41,054; Referee: Piero Giacomelli

28 May 2017 38	Cagliari	2–1	Milan	Cagliari
15:00 CEST	João Pedro 17', (yellow card) 42'; Deiola (yellow card) 61'; Padoin (yellow card) 78'; Pisacane 90+3'	Report	Gómez (yellow card) 65'; Paletta (yellow card) 68' (yellow-red card) 75'; Lapadula 72' (pen.)	Stadium: Stadio Sant'Elia; Attendance: 12,225; Referee: Rosario Abisso

=== Coppa Italia ===
12 January 2017 Round of 16	Milan	2–1	Torino	Milan
21:00 CET	Lapadula (yellow card) 49'; Kucka 61'; Bonaventura 64'; Abate (yellow card) 78'	Report	Belotti 27'; Barreca (yellow card) 57' (yellow-red card) 87'	Stadium: San Siro; Attendance: 13,892; Referee: Carmine Russo

25 January 2017 Quarter-finals	Juventus	2–1	Milan	Turin
20:45 CET (UTC+01:00)	Dybala 10'; Pjanić 21', (yellow card) 30'; Mandžukić (yellow card) 44'; Bonucci (yellow card) 69'; Alex Sandro (yellow card) 71'	Report	Kucka (yellow card) 20'; Locatelli (yellow card) 33' (yellow-red card) 54'; Bacca 53'; Antonelli (yellow card) 72'; Zapata (yellow card) 74'	Stadium: Juventus Stadium; Attendance: 40,142; Referee: Massimiliano Irrati

=== Supercoppa Italiana ===
23 December 2016	Juventus	1–1 (a.e.t.) (3–4 p)	Milan	Doha, Qatar
19:30 AST	Chiellini 18'; Lichtsteiner (yellow card) 35'; Higuaín (yellow card) 120+1'	Report	Bonaventura 38'; Romagnoli (yellow card) 43'; Kucka (yellow card) 59'; De Sciglio (yellow card) 70'	Stadium: Jassim Bin Hamad Stadium; Attendance: 11,356; Referee: Antonio Damato
	Penalties
	Marchisio (penalty scored); Mandžukić (penalty missed); Higuaín (penalty scored); Khedira (penalty scored); Dybala (penalty missed)		(penalty missed) Lapadula; (penalty scored) Bonaventura; (penalty scored) Kucka; (penalty scored) Suso; (penalty scored) Pašalić

== Statistics ==
=== Appearances and goals ===
No.	Pos	Nat	Player	Total		Serie A		Coppa Italia		Supercoppa	
No.	Pos	Nat	Player	Apps	Goals	Apps	Goals	Apps	Goals	Apps	Goals
Goalkeepers
30	GK	(Italy) ITA	Marco Storari	0	0	0	0	0	0	0	0
35	GK	(Italy) ITA	Alessandro Plizzari	0	0	0	0	0	0	0	0
99	GK	(Italy) ITA	Gianluigi Donnarumma	41	0	38	0	2	0	1	0
Defenders
2	DF	(Italy) ITA	Mattia De Sciglio	27	0	23+2	0	1	0	1	0
13	DF	(Italy) ITA	Alessio Romagnoli	29	1	27	1	1	0	1	0
15	DF	(Paraguay) PAR	Gustavo Gómez	19	0	11+7	0	1	0	0	0
17	DF	(Colombia) COL	Cristián Zapata	16	1	12+3	1	1	0	0	0
20	DF	(Italy) ITA	Ignazio Abate	26	0	22+1	0	2	0	1	0
21	DF	(Argentina) ARG	Leonel Vangioni	15	0	11+4	0	0	0	0	0
29	DF	(Italy) ITA	Gabriel Paletta	32	2	30	2	1	0	1	0
31	DF	(Italy) ITA	Luca Antonelli	9	0	3+4	0	1	0	0+1	0
96	DF	(Italy) ITA	Davide Calabria	13	0	11+1	0	0+1	0	0	0
Midfielders
5	MF	(Italy) ITA	Giacomo Bonaventura	22	5	19	3	2	1	1	1
10	MF	(Japan) JPN	Keisuke Honda	9	1	2+6	1	0+1	0	0	0
14	MF	(Chile) CHI	Matías Fernández	13	1	8+5	1	0	0	0	0
16	MF	(Italy) ITA	Andrea Poli	13	0	3+10	0	0	0	0	0
18	MF	(Italy) ITA	Riccardo Montolivo	9	0	9	0	0	0	0	0
23	MF	(Argentina) ARG	José Sosa	19	0	15+3	0	1	0	0	0
33	MF	(Slovakia) SVK	Juraj Kucka	33	4	23+7	3	2	1	1	0
73	MF	(Italy) ITA	Manuel Locatelli	28	2	17+8	2	1+1	0	1	0
80	MF	(Croatia) CRO	Mario Pašalić	27	5	20+4	5	0+2	0	0+1	0
91	MF	(Italy) ITA	Andrea Bertolacci	18	1	9+6	1	2	0	1	0
Forwards
7	FW	(Spain) ESP	Gerard Deulofeu	18	4	16+1	4	0+1	0	0	0
8	FW	(Spain) ESP	Suso	37	7	33+1	7	2	0	1	0
9	FW	(Italy) ITA	Gianluca Lapadula	29	8	12+15	8	1	0	0+1	0
11	FW	(Argentina) ARG	Lucas Ocampos	12	0	4+8	0	0	0	0	0
63	FW	(Italy) ITA	Patrick Cutrone	1	0	0+1	0	0	0	0	0
70	FW	(Colombia) COL	Carlos Bacca	34	14	26+6	13	1	1	1	0
Players transferred out during the season
1	GK	(Brazil) BRA	Gabriel	0	0	0	0	0	0	0	0
4	DF	(Brazil) BRA	Rodrigo Ely	0	0	0	0	0	0	0	0
7	FW	(Brazil) BRA	Luiz Adriano	7	0	1+6	0	0	0	0	0
11	FW	(France) FRA	M'Baye Niang	18	3	13+5	3	0	0	0	0
Other
NN			Own goals	0	2	0	2	0	0	0	0

Last updated: 28 May 2017
Source: Competitions

=== Goalscorers ===
In italics players that left the team during the season.

Rank	No.	Pos	Nat	Name	Serie A	Coppa Italia	Supercoppa Italia	Total
1	70	FW	(Colombia)	Carlos Bacca	13	1	0	14
2	9	FW	(Italy)	Gianluca Lapadula	8	0	0	8
3	8	FW	(Spain)	Suso	7	0	0	7
4	5	MF	(Italy)	Giacomo Bonaventura	3	1	1	5
4	80	MF	(Croatia)	Mario Pašalić	5	0	0	5
6	33	MF	(Slovakia)	Juraj Kucka	3	1	0	4
6	7	FW	(Spain)	Gerard Deulofeu	4	0	0	4
8	11	FW	(France)	M'Baye Niang	3	0	0	3
9	29	DF	(Italy)	Gabriel Paletta	2	0	0	2
9	73	MF	(Italy)	Manuel Locatelli	2	0	0	2
11	10	MF	(Japan)	Keisuke Honda	1	0	0	1
11	13	DF	(Italy)	Alessio Romagnoli	1	0	0	1
11	14	MF	(Chile)	Matías Fernández	1	0	0	1
11	17	DF	(Colombia)	Cristián Zapata	1	0	0	1
11	91	MF	(Italy)	Andrea Bertolacci	1	0	0	1
Own goals					2	0	0	2
Totals					57	3	1	61

Last updated: 28 May 2017

=== Clean sheets ===
Rank	No.	Pos	Nat	Name	Serie A	Coppa Italia	Supercoppa Italia	Total
1	99	GK	(Italy)	Gianluigi Donnarumma	12	0	0	12
Totals					12	0	0	12

Last updated: 28 May 2017

=== Disciplinary record ===
Includes all competitive matches. Players listed below made at least one appearance for A.C. Milan first squad during the season.

N	P	Nat.	Name	Serie A			Coppa Italia			Supercoppa Italiana			Total			Notes
N	P	Nat.	Name	Yellow card	Second yellow card	Red card	Yellow card	Second yellow card	Red card	Yellow card	Second yellow card	Red card	Yellow card	Second yellow card	Red card	Notes
2	DF	(Italy)	Mattia De Sciglio	4						1			5			
5	MF	(Italy)	Giacomo Bonaventura	3									3			
7	FW	(Spain)	Gerard Deulofeu	4									4			
8	FW	(Spain)	Suso	5									5			
9	FW	(Italy)	Gianluca Lapadula	3			1						4			
11	FW	(Argentina)	Lucas Ocampos	3									3			
11	FW	(France)	M'Baye Niang		1									1		
13	DF	(Italy)	Alessio Romagnoli	4	1					1			5	1		
14	MF	(Chile)	Matías Fernández	1									1			
15	DF	(Paraguay)	Gustavo Gómez	4									4			
16	MF	(Italy)	Andrea Poli	1									1			
17	DF	(Colombia)	Cristián Zapata				1						1			
18	MF	(Italy)	Riccardo Montolivo	2									2			
20	DF	(Italy)	Ignazio Abate	2			1						3			
21	DF	(Argentina)	Leonel Vangioni	4									4			
23	MF	(Argentina)	José Sosa	5	2								5	2		
29	DF	(Italy)	Gabriel Paletta	3	3	2							3	3	2	
31	DF	(Italy)	Luca Antonelli	1			1						2			
33	MF	(Slovakia)	Juraj Kucka	8	2	1	1			1			10	2	1	
70	FW	(Colombia)	Carlos Bacca	3									3			
63	FW	(Italy)	Patrick Cutrone	1									1			
73	MF	(Italy)	Manuel Locatelli	7				1					7	1		
80	MF	(Croatia)	Mario Pašalić	5									5			
91	MF	(Italy)	Andrea Bertolacci	3									3			
96	DF	(Italy)	Davide Calabria	3									3			
99	GK	(Italy)	Gianluigi Donnarumma	2									2			

Last updated: 28 May 2017
Only competitive matches
(yellow card) = Number of bookings; (second yellow card) = Number of sending offs after a second yellow card; (red card) = Number of sending offs by a direct red card.
