= 2014–15 Genoa CFC season =

Genoa
2014–15 season
- President: Enrico Preziosi
- Manager: Gian Piero Gasperini
- Stadium: Stadio Luigi Ferraris
- Serie A: 6th
- Coppa Italia: Fourth round
- Top goalscorer: League: Iago Falque (13); All: Iago Falque (13)
- Highest home attendance: 29,800 vs Sampdoria (28 September 2014, Serie A)
- Lowest home attendance: 17,568 vs Parma (15 April 2015, Serie A)
- Average home league attendance: 20,045
Home colours	Away colours

The 2014–15 season was Genoa Cricket and Football Club's eighth consecutive season in Serie A following the club's promotion from Serie B at the end of the 2006–07 season. The team competed in Serie A, finishing 6th, and in the Coppa Italia, where the club was eliminated in the fourth round.

== Players ==
=== Squad information ===
As of 30 September 2014.

Note: Flags indicate national team as defined under FIFA eligibility rules; some limited exceptions apply. Players may hold more than one non-FIFA nationality.

No.	Pos.	Nation	Player
1	GK	ITA	Mattia Perin
3	DF	ITA	Luca Antonini
4	DF	FRA	Sebastian De Maio
5	DF	ITA	Armando Izzo
8	DF	ARG	Nicolás Burdisso
9	FW	CHI	Mauricio Pinilla
10	MF	ARG	Diego Perotti
13	DF	ITA	Luca Antonelli
14	DF	ARG	Facundo Roncaglia (on loan from Fiorentina)
15	DF	ITA	Giovanni Marchese
16	MF	BEL	Maxime Lestienne (on loan from Al-Arabi)
18	MF	GRE	Giannis Fetfatzidis
19	MF	ITA	Leandro Greco
21	MF	BRA	Edenílson

No.	Pos.	Nation	Player
23	GK	ITA	Eugenio Lamanna
24	MF	ESP	Iago Falque
27	MF	ITA	Antonino Ragusa (on loan from Pescara)
32	FW	ITA	Alessandro Matri (on loan from Milan)
33	MF	SVK	Juraj Kucka
38	MF	ITA	Rolando Mandragora
69	MF	ITA	Stefano Sturaro (on loan from Juventus)
87	DF	ITA	Aleandro Rosi
88	MF	VEN	Tomás Rincón
91	MF	ITA	Andrea Bertolacci
92	MF	ARG	Franco Mussis (on loan from Copenhagen)

== Competitions ==
=== Serie A ===
==== League table ====
Pos	Team	Pld	W	D	L	GF	GA	GD	Pts	Qualification or relegation
4	Fiorentina	38	18	10	10	61	46	+15	64	Qualification for the Europa League group stage (Note: Since the winners of the 2014–15 Coppa Italia (Juventus) qualified for European competition based on league position, the spot awarded to the cup winners (Europa League group stage) was passed to the fifth-placed team and the spot originally meant for the fifth-placed team (Europa League third qualifying round) was given to the highest placed team that has obtained an UEFA licence and not already qualified for European competition.)
5	Napoli	38	18	9	11	70	54	+16	63	Qualification for the Europa League group stage
6	Genoa (Note: Genoa failed to obtain a UEFA licence from Italian Football Federation. Therefore, they were barred to participate in European competitions. Genoa appealed the decision, but the appeal was denied.)	38	16	11	11	62	47	+15	59	
7	Sampdoria	38	13	17	8	48	42	+6	56	Qualification for the Europa League third qualifying round
8	Internazionale	38	14	13	11	59	48	+11	55	

Source: 2014–15 Serie A, 2014-15 Serie A classification.
Rules for classification: 1) points; 2) head-to-head points; 3) head-to-head goal difference; 4) goal difference; 5) number of goals scored; 6) draw. (Head-to-head record is applied for clubs with the same number of points only once all matches between said clubs have been played.).

==== Results summary ====
Overall								Home						Away					
Pld	W	D	L	GF	GA	GD	Pts	W	D	L	GF	GA	GD	W	D	L	GF	GA	GD
38	16	11	11	62	47	+15	59	9	6	4	33	21	+12	7	5	7	29	26	+3

Last updated: 31 May 2015.
Source: Competitive matches

==== Results by round ====
Round	1	2	3	4	5	6	7	8	9	10	11	12	13	14	15	16	17	18	19	20	21	22	23	24	25	26	27	28	29	30	31	32	33	34	35	36	37	38
Ground	H	A	H	A	H	A	H	A	H	A	A	H	A	H	H	A	H	A	H	A	H	A	H	A	H	A	H	A	H	H	A	H	A	A	H	A	H	A
Result	L	D	W	D	L	W	D	W	W	W	D	D	W	W	L	L	D	L	D	L	D	W	W	D	P	D	L	L	D	W	L	W	W	L	W	W	W	L
Position	15	15	9	8	11	11	10	9	9	6	6	5	4	3	5	6	5	7	7	7	9	7	6	7	7	7	8	10	10	10	7	7	6	7	7	6	6	6

Updated to match(es) played on 31 May 2015. Source: Competitive matches
A = Away; H = Home; W = Win; D = Draw; L = Loss

==== Matches ====
31 August 2014 1	Genoa	1–2	Napoli	Genoa
20:45 CEST (UTC+02:00)	Pinilla 40'; Marchese (yellow card) 53'; Sturaro (yellow card) 55'; Ragusa (yellow card) 80'	Report	Callejón 3'; Albiol (yellow card) 77'; De Guzmán 90+5'	Stadium: Stadio Luigi Ferraris; Attendance: 21,963; Referee: Luca Banti

14 September 2014 2	Fiorentina	0–0	Genoa	Florence
15:00 CEST (UTC+02:00)	Tomović (yellow card) 51'	Report	Bertolacci (yellow card) 16'; Roncaglia (yellow card) 31' (yellow-red card) 72'; Rincón (yellow card) 78'; Perotti (yellow card) 85'	Stadium: Stadio Artemio Franchi; Attendance: 34,058; Referee: Daniele Orsato

21 September 2014 3	Genoa	1–0	Lazio	Genoa
15:00 CEST (UTC+02:00)	Rincón (yellow card) 47'; Pinilla 87'; De Maio (yellow card) 90+3'	Report	Ledesma (yellow card) 57'; De Vrij (yellow card) 70' (yellow-red card) 85'	Stadium: Stadio Luigi Ferraris; Attendance: 18,279; Referee: Marco Guida

24 September 2014 4	Hellas Verona	2–2	Genoa	Verona
20:45 CEST (UTC+02:00)	Tachtsidis (yellow card) 45', (goal) 52'; Márquez (yellow card) 55'; Ioniță 64'	Report	Falque (yellow card) 25'; Matri 34', 47'; Sturaro (yellow card) 54'	Stadium: Stadio Marc'Antonio Bentegodi; Attendance: 16,785; Referee: Dino Tommasi

28 September 2014 5	Genoa	0–1	Sampdoria	Genoa
20:45 CEST (UTC+02:00)	Burdisso (yellow card) 49'; Pinilla (yellow card) 53'; Sturaro (yellow card) 78'	Report	Silvestre (yellow card) 38'; Éder (yellow card) 50'; Gabbiadini 75'; Okaka (yellow card) 77'; Obiang (yellow card) 80'	Stadium: Stadio Luigi Ferraris; Attendance: 29,800; Referee: Antonio Damato

5 October 2014 6	Parma	1–2	Genoa	Parma
15:00 CEST (UTC+02:00)	Coda 66'; Lucarelli (yellow card) 75'; Gobbi (yellow card) 82'	Report	Roncaglia (yellow card) 35' (yellow-red card) 55'; Perotti 53'; Matri (yellow card) 76', (goal) 90+3'; Antonelli (yellow card) 89'	Stadium: Stadio Ennio Tardini; Attendance: 11,898; Referee: Daniele Doveri

20 October 2015 7	Genoa	1–1	Empoli	Genoa
20:45 CEST (UTC+02:00)	Bertolacci 14', (yellow card) 90+2'; Antonini (yellow card) 71'; Perotti (yellow card) 78'	Report	Croce (yellow card) 76'; Tonelli 77'	Stadium: Stadio Luigi Ferraris; Attendance: 17,843; Referee: Angelo Cervellera

26 October 2014 8	Chievo	1–2	Genoa	Verona
15:00 CET (UTC+01:00)	Meggiorini (yellow card) 15'; Radovanović (yellow card) 27' (red card) 73'; Zukanović 36', (yellow card) 88'	Report	Burdisso (yellow card) 22'; Kucka (yellow card) 30'; Greco (yellow card) 54'; Matri 72'; Pinilla 84'	Stadium: Stadio Marc'Antonio Bentegodi; Attendance: 7,000; Referee: Marco Di Bello

29 October 2014 9	Genoa	1–0	Juventus	Genoa
20:45 CET (UTC+01:00)	Greco (yellow card) 73'; De Maio (yellow card) 88'; Antonini 90+4'	Report	Ogbonna (yellow card) 16'; Vidal (yellow card) 44'; Chiellini (yellow card) 58'; Lichtsteiner (yellow card) 90+2'	Stadium: Stadio Luigi Ferraris; Attendance: 21,971; Referee: Paolo Mazzoleni

2 November 2014 10	Udinese	2–4	Genoa	Udine
15:00 CET (UTC+01:00)	Di Natale 1'; Fernandes (yellow card) 39'; Widmer 41'; Guilherme (yellow card) 90'	Report	Marchese 21'; Falque 24', (yellow card) 36'; De Maio (yellow card) 30'; Roncaglia (yellow card) 34'; Matri 54'; Kucka 87'	Stadium: Stadio Friuli; Attendance: 8,701; Referee: Massimiliano Irrati

9 November 2014 11	Cagliari	1–1	Genoa	Cagliari
12:30 CET (UTC+01:00)	João Pedro (yellow card) 10'; Farias 16'; Conti (yellow card) 39'; Sau (yellow card) 44'; Avelar (yellow card) 69'; Balzano (yellow card) 90+2'	Report	Sturaro (yellow card) 12' (yellow-red card) 76'; Edenílson (yellow card) 19'; Rossettini 53' (o.g.); Antonelli (yellow card) 41'; Burdisso (yellow card) 73'	Stadium: Stadio Sant'Elia; Attendance: 8,000; Referee: Sebastiano Peruzzo

24 November 2014 12	Genoa	1–1	Palermo	Genoa
20:45 CET (UTC+01:00)	Antonelli 30'; Roncaglia (yellow card) 33'; Greco (yellow card) 56'	Report	Dybala 7'	Stadium: Stadio Luigi Ferraris; Attendance: 18,588; Referee: Michael Fabbri

30 November 2014 13	Cesena	0–3	Genoa	Cesena
15:00 CET (UTC+01:00)	Lucchini (yellow card) 29'; Giorgi (yellow card) 33'; Carbonero (yellow card) 51'	Report	Matri 4'; Antonelli 7'; Roncaglia (yellow card) 34'; Volta 43' (o.g.); Burdisso (yellow card) 89'	Stadium: Stadio Dino Manuzzi; Attendance: 14,650; Referee: Carmine Russo

7 December 2014 14	Genoa	1–0	Milan	Genoa
15:00 CET (UTC+01:00)	Antonelli 32', (yellow card) 56'; Sturaro (yellow card) 73'; Perotti (yellow card) 90+1'	Report	Rami (yellow card) 58'; Mexès (yellow card) 62'	Stadium: Stadio Luigi Ferraris; Attendance: 21,319; Referee: Paolo Tagliavento

14 December 2014 15	Genoa	0–1	Roma	Genoa
15:00 CET (UTC+01:00)	Perin (red card) 29'; Pinilla (yellow card) 80'; Perotti (yellow card) 84'	Report	Astori (yellow card) 25'; Yanga-Mbiwa (yellow card) 28'; Nainggolan 40'; Pjanić (yellow card) 90+1'	Stadium: Stadio Luigi Ferraris; Attendance: 20,055; Referee: Luca Banti

21 December 2014 16	Torino	2–1	Genoa	Turin
15:00 CET (UTC+01:00)	Moretti (yellow card) 19'; Glik 52', 63'	Report	Falque (yellow card) 15', (goal) 42'; Burdisso (yellow card) 33'; Rincón (yellow card) 36'; Marchese (yellow card) 55'	Stadium: Stadio Olimpico di Torino; Attendance: 15,611; Referee: Dino Tommasi

6 January 2015 17	Genoa	2–2	Atalanta	Genoa
15:00 CET (UTC+01:00)	Burdisso (yellow card) 9'; Roncaglia (yellow card) 13'; Falque 51' (pen.); Matri 69', (yellow card) 85'; Costa (yellow card) 90+2'	Report	Baselli (yellow card) 9'; Dramé (yellow card) 19'; Zappacosta 37'; Moralez 49'; Benalouane (yellow card) 51'; D'Alessandro (yellow card) 52'	Stadium: Stadio Luigi Ferraris; Attendance: 18,415; Referee: Massimiliano Irrati

11 January 2015 18	Internazionale	3–1	Genoa	Milan
12:30 CET (UTC+01:00)	Palacio 12'; Icardi 39'; Campagnaro (yellow card) 85'; Vidić 88'	Report	De Maio (yellow card) 71'; Bertolacci (yellow card) 82'; Izzo 85'	Stadium: San Siro; Attendance: 37,525; Referee: Carmine Russo

18 January 2015 19	Genoa	3–3	Sassuolo	Genoa
15:00 CET (UTC+01:00)	Falque 25'; Fetfatzidis 53', 90+2' (pen.); Lestienne (yellow card) 75'	Report	Berardi 19' (pen.), 69', (yellow card) 43'; Missiroli 50'; Brighi (yellow card) 55'; Magnanelli (yellow card) 76'; Zaza (yellow card) 81'	Stadium: Stadio Luigi Ferraris; Attendance: 17,822; Referee: Piero Giacomelli

26 January 2015 20	Napoli	2–1	Genoa	Naples
21:00 CET (UTC+01:00)	Higuaín 7', 75' (pen.); Albiol (yellow card) 25'; Koulibaly (yellow card) 81'; Inler (yellow card) 88'	Report	Bertolacci (yellow card) 40'; Falque 56'; Perotti (yellow card) 60'; Antonelli (yellow card) 61'; Kucka (yellow card) 80'; Niang (yellow card) 90+1'	Stadium: Stadio San Paolo; Attendance: 30,821; Referee: Gianpaolo Calvarese

31 January 2015 21	Genoa	1–1	Fiorentina	Genoa
18:00 CET (UTC+01:00)	Tătărușanu 14' (o.g.); Burdisso (yellow card) 45' (yellow-red card) 81'; Sturaro (yellow card) 83'	Report	Gonzalo 54'; Valero (yellow card) 73'	Stadium: Stadio Luigi Ferraris; Attendance: 18,829; Referee: Nicola Rizzoli

9 February 2015 22	Lazio	0–1	Genoa	Rome
20:45 CET (UTC+01:00)	Mauri (yellow card) 14'; Cana (yellow card) 16'; Marchetti (red card) 27'; Candreva (yellow card) 44'; De Vrij (yellow card) 45+3'	Report	Bertolacci (yellow card) 18'; Perotti 30' (pen.); Roncaglia (yellow card) 50'; De Maio (yellow card) 70'; Lestienne (yellow card) 88'; Pavoletti (yellow card) 89'	Stadium: Stadio Olimpico; Attendance: 28,355; Referee: Andrea Gervasoni

15 February 2015 23	Genoa	5–2	Hellas Verona	Genoa
15:00 CET (UTC+01:00)	Agostini 10' (o.g.); Niang 12', 30'; Kucka (yellow card) 63'; Bertolacci 65'; Laxalt (yellow card) 73'; Perotti 86'	Report	Toni 20', 57'; Tachtsidis (yellow card) 25'; Greco (yellow card) 44'; Sørensen (yellow card) 50'; Pisano (yellow card) 81'	Stadium: Stadio Luigi Ferraris; Attendance: 17,823; Referee: Antonio Damato

24 February 2015 24	Sampdoria	1–1	Genoa	Genoa
20:45 CET (UTC+01:00)	Viviano (yellow card) 17'; Éder 19', (yellow card) 73'; Soriano (yellow card) 40'; Obiang (yellow card) 76'	Report	Falque 17'; Roncaglia (yellow card) 26'	Stadium: Stadio Luigi Ferraris; Attendance: 30,585; Referee: Gianluca Rocchi

15 April 2015 25	Genoa	2–0	Parma	Genoa
18:30 CEST (UTC+02:00)	Falque 14', (yellow card) 62'; Roncaglia (yellow card) 45'; Pavoletti 76'; Kucka (yellow card) 83'	Report	Lila (yellow card) 20'; Belfodil (yellow card) 55'; Nocerino (yellow card) 71'; Jorquera (yellow card) 80'; Lucarelli (yellow card) 84'	Stadium: Stadio Luigi Ferraris; Attendance: 17,568; Referee: Claudio Gavilucci
Note: Postponed from 1 March due to Parma's financial troubles.

8 March 2015 26	Empoli	1–1	Genoa	Empoli
15:00 CET (UTC+01:00)	Barba 66'; Mário Rui (yellow card) 75'; Valdifiori (yellow card) 88'	Report	Niang 27'; Burdisso (yellow card) 61'; Bertolacci (yellow card) 69'	Stadium: Stadio Carlo Castellani; Attendance: 10,392; Referee: Fabio Maresca

15 March 2015 27	Genoa	0–2	Chievo	Genoa
15:00 CET (UTC+01:00)	Bertolacci (yellow card) 11'; Falque (yellow card) 26'; Rincón (yellow card) 70'; De Maio (yellow card) 81'	Report	Hetemaj (yellow card) 21'; Paloschi 49', 68'; Dainelli (yellow card) 61'; Birsa (yellow card) 90+2'	Stadium: Stadio Luigi Ferraris; Attendance: 17,630; Referee: Daniele Doveri

22 March 2015 28	Juventus	1–0	Genoa	Turin
15:00 CET (UTC+01:00)	Tevez 25'; Bonucci (yellow card) 49'	Report	Perotti (yellow card) 14'; Bertolacci (yellow card) 23'; Borriello (yellow card) 49'; Roncaglia (yellow card) 61'	Stadium: Juventus Stadium; Attendance: 39,919; Referee: Marco Di Bello

4 April 2015 29	Genoa	1–1	Udinese	Genoa
15:00 CEST (UTC+02:00)	De Maio 19'; Costa (yellow card) 62'; Rincón (yellow card) 78'	Report	Pinzi (yellow card) 18'; Piris (yellow card) 44'; Guilherme (yellow card) 49'; Théréau 68'	Stadium: Stadio Luigi Ferraris; Attendance: 18,117; Referee: Paolo Mazzoleni

11 April 2015 30	Genoa	2–0	Cagliari	Genoa
18:00 CEST (UTC+02:00)	Edenílson (yellow card) 10'; Niang 52', (yellow card) 57'; Falque 58'	Report	Dessena (yellow card) 9'; Ceppitelli (yellow card) 45+1'; Crisetig (yellow card) 88'	Stadium: Stadio Luigi Ferraris; Attendance: 17,727; Referee: Carmine Russo

19 April 2015 31	Palermo	2–1	Genoa	Palermo
15:00 CEST (UTC+02:00)	Chochev 9', 30'; Vitiello (yellow card) 36'; Jajalo (yellow card) 55'; Vázquez (yellow card) 66'; Belotti (yellow card) 83'	Report	Falque 52'; Rincón (yellow card) 71'; De Maio (yellow card) 78'; Pavoletti (yellow card) 90'	Stadium: Stadio Renzo Barbera; Attendance: 15,471; Referee: Angelo Cervellera

26 April 2015 32	Genoa	3–1	Cesena	Genoa
15:00 CEST (UTC+02:00)	Bertolacci (yellow card) 10', (goal) 38'; Perotti 45+3' (pen.); Pavoletti 53', (yellow card) 74'	Report	Volta (yellow card) 11'; Carbonero 69', (yellow card) 86'; Cascione (yellow card) 78'; Zé Eduardo (red card) 90+2'	Stadium: Stadio Luigi Ferraris; Attendance: 19,663; Referee: Sebastiano Peruzzo

29 April 2015 33	Milan	1–3	Genoa	Milan
20:45 CEST (UTC+02:00)	Ménez (yellow card) 29' (yellow-red card) 72'; Mexès (yellow card) 50', (goal) 66'; Abate (yellow card) 90+1'	Report	Edenílson (yellow card) 28'; Bertolacci 36'; Burdisso (yellow card) 45'; Niang 49'; Costa (yellow card) 54'; Falque (yellow card) 79', (goal) 90+3' (pen.)	Stadium: San Siro; Attendance: 25,916; Referee: Piero Giacomelli

3 May 2015 34	Roma	2–0	Genoa	Rome
15:00 CEST (UTC+02:00)	Doumbia 35'; Manolas (yellow card) 51'; Torosidis (yellow card) 65'; De Rossi (yellow card) 90+1'; Florenzi 90+3'	Report	Rincón (yellow card) 32'; Laxalt (yellow card) 55'; Izzo (yellow card) 61'	Stadium: Stadio Olimpico; Attendance: 37,068; Referee: Antonio Damato

11 May 2015 35	Genoa	5–1	Torino	Genoa
20:45 CEST (UTC+02:00)	Falque 18'; De Maio (yellow card) 66'; Costa 69', 90+5'; Roncaglia (yellow card) 77'; Bertolacci 87'; Pavoletti 90+2'	Report	Maxi López (yellow card) 39'; Peres (yellow card) 56'; El Kaddouri 61'; Moretti (yellow card) 68'; Amauri (yellow card) 88'	Stadium: Stadio Luigi Ferraris; Attendance: 20,282; Referee: Daniele Orsato

17 May 2015 36	Atalanta	1–4	Genoa	Bergamo
15:00 CEST (UTC+02:00)	Pinilla 18' (pen.), (yellow card) 86'; Migliaccio (yellow card) 54'; Carmona (yellow card) 71'	Report	Pavoletti 30'; Izzo (yellow card) 48'; Bertolacci 57'; Falque 61', 73'	Stadium: Stadio Atleti Azzurri d'Italia; Attendance: 16,881; Referee: Andrea Gervasoni

23 May 2015 37	Genoa	3–2	Internazionale	Genoa
20:45 CEST (UTC+02:00)	Pavoletti 24'; Lestienne 41'; Kucka (yellow card) 44', (goal) 89'; De Maio (yellow card) 63'; Roncaglia (yellow card) 90+1'	Report	Icardi 19'; Palacio 30'; Hernanes (yellow card) 39'; Brozović (yellow card) 44'; D'Ambrosio (yellow card) 64'; Juan (yellow card) 88'	Stadium: Stadio Luigi Ferraris; Attendance: 27,161; Referee: Paolo Tagliavento

31 May 2015 38	Sassuolo	3–1	Genoa	Reggio Emilia
20:45 CEST (UTC+02:00)	Berardi 3'; Zaza 18', 32'; Magnanelli (yellow card) 65'; Sansone (yellow card) 82'; Floccari (yellow card) 88'	Report	Roncaglia (yellow card) 7'; Bertolacci (yellow card) 27'; Pavoletti 41', (yellow card) 67'; Rincón (yellow card) 64'; Izzo (red card) 72'	Stadium: Mapei Stadium – Città del Tricolore; Attendance: 14,886; Referee: Angelo Cervellera

=== Coppa Italia ===
24 August 2014 Third round	Virtus Lanciano	0–1	Genoa	Lanciano
19:00 CEST (UTC+02:00)			Pinilla 30' (pen.)	Stadium: Stadio Guido Biondi; Attendance: 3,118; Referee: Daniele Doveri

3 December 2014 Fourth round	Empoli	2–0	Genoa	Empoli
18:00 CET (UTC+01:00)	Laxalt 4'; Mchedlidze (yellow card) 68', (goal) 73'; Zieliński (yellow card) 89'	Report	Greco (yellow card) 8'; Matri (yellow card) 75'; Pinilla (yellow card) 85'	Stadium: Stadio Carlo Castellani; Attendance: 1,470; Referee: Marco Di Bello

== Statistics ==
=== Appearances and goals ===
No.	Pos	Nat	Player	Total		Serie A		Coppa Italia	
No.	Pos	Nat	Player	Apps	Goals	Apps	Goals	Apps	Goals
Goalkeepers
1	GK	(Italy) ITA	Mattia Perin	32	0	32	0	0	0
23	GK	(Italy) ITA	Eugenio Lamanna	8	0	6+2	0	0	0
Defenders
2	DF	(France) FRA	Alassane També	6	0	2+4	0	0	0
3	DF	(Italy) ITA	Luca Antonini	7	1	3+4	1	0	0
4	DF	(France) FRA	Sebastian De Maio	33	1	31+2	1	0	0
5	DF	(Italy) ITA	Armando Izzo	20	1	11+9	1	0	0
8	DF	(Argentina) ARG	Nicolás Burdisso	30	0	30	0	0	0
14	DF	(Argentina) ARG	Facundo Roncaglia	32	0	32	0	0	0
15	DF	(Italy) ITA	Giovanni Marchese	11	1	10+1	1	0	0
18	DF	(Morocco) MAR	Zakarya Bergdich	11	0	9+2	0	0	0
41	DF	(Italy) ITA	Lorenzo Ariaudo	0	0	0	0	0	0
Midfielders
10	MF	(Argentina) ARG	Diego Perotti	27	4	27	4	0	0
16	MF	(Belgium) BEL	Maxime Lestienne	23	1	10+13	1	0	0
20	MF	(Argentina) ARG	Tino Costa	6	2	2+4	2	0	0
21	MF	(Brazil) BRA	Edenílson	30	0	28+2	0	0	0
24	MF	(Spain) ESP	Iago Falque	32	13	28+4	13	0	0
33	MF	(Slovakia) SVK	Juraj Kucka	34	2	19+15	2	0	0
38	MF	(Italy) ITA	Rolando Mandragora	5	0	2+3	0	0	0
69	MF	(Italy) ITA	Stefano Sturaro	13	0	13	0	0	0
88	MF	(Venezuela) VEN	Tomás Rincón	29	0	27+2	0	0	0
91	MF	(Italy) ITA	Andrea Bertolacci	34	6	31+3	6	0	0
93	MF	(Uruguay) URU	Diego Laxalt	8	0	1+7	0	0	0
Forwards
11	FW	(France) FRA	M'Baye Niang	14	5	12+2	5	0	0
19	FW	(Italy) ITA	Leonardo Pavoletti	10	6	4+6	6	0	0
22	FW	(Italy) ITA	Marco Borriello	8	0	3+5	0	0	0
37	FW	(Italy) ITA	Giuseppe Panico	1	0	0+1	0	0	0
Players transferred out during the season
9	FW	(Chile) CHI	Mauricio Pinilla	12	3	6+6	3	0	0
13	DF	(Italy) ITA	Luca Antonelli	19	3	18+1	3	0	0
18	MF	(Greece) GRE	Giannis Fetfatzidis	5	2	2+3	2	0	0
19	MF	(Italy) ITA	Leandro Greco	7	0	3+4	0	0	0
27	MF	(Italy) ITA	Antonino Ragusa	1	0	0+1	0	0	0
32	FW	(Italy) ITA	Alessandro Matri	16	7	12+4	7	0	0
87	DF	(Italy) ITA	Aleandro Rosi	7	0	4+3	0	0	0
92	MF	(Argentina) ARG	Franco Mussis	1	0	0+1	0	0	0

Last updated: 30 May 2015
Source: BDFutbol
