= 2016 Supercoppa Italiana =

- Event: Supercoppa Italiana
Juventus	AC Milan
Serie A	Coppa Italia
1	1
- After extra time Milan won 4–3 on penalties
- Date: 23 December 2016
- Venue: Jassim bin Hamad Stadium, Doha, Qatar
- Referee: Antonio Damato
- Attendance: 11,356

The 2016 Supercoppa Italiana was the 29th edition of the Supercoppa Italiana. It was played on 23 December 2016 at Jassim bin Hamad Stadium in Doha, Qatar. Juventus were the defending champions. With Juventus winning both the 2015–16 Serie A championship and the 2015–16 Coppa Italia, the game was played between Juventus and the 2015–16 Coppa Italia runners-up, AC Milan. AC Milan won 4–3 on penalties following a 1–1 draw after extra time for the record-tying seventh title.

== Venue ==
City	Stadium	Location of the host city of the 2016 Supercoppa Italiana.
Doha	Jassim bin Hamad Stadium (Al-Sadd Stadium)	Location of the host city of the 2016 Supercoppa Italiana.
Capacity: 15,000		Location of the host city of the 2016 Supercoppa Italiana.

== Match ==
=== Details ===
23 December 2016
19:30 AST

Juventus	1–1 (a.e.t.)	AC Milan
Chiellini 18'	Report	Bonaventura 38'
Penalties
Marchisio (penalty scored); Mandžukić (penalty missed); Higuaín (penalty scored); Khedira (penalty scored); Dybala (penalty missed)	3–4	(penalty missed) Lapadula; (penalty scored) Bonaventura; (penalty scored) Kucka; (penalty scored) Suso; (penalty scored) Pašalić

Jassim bin Hamad Stadium, Doha (Qatar)
Attendance: 11,356
Referee: Antonio Damato

Juventus	AC Milan

GK	1	(Italy) Gianluigi Buffon (c)
RB	26	(Switzerland) Stephan Lichtsteiner	(yellow card) 35'
CB	24	(Italy) Daniele Rugani
CB	3	(Italy) Giorgio Chiellini
LB	12	(Brazil) Alex Sandro		(substituted off) 32'
DM	6	(Germany) Sami Khedira
RM	8	(Italy) Claudio Marchisio
LM	27	(Italy) Stefano Sturaro		(substituted off) 79'
AM	5	(Bosnia and Herzegovina) Miralem Pjanić		(substituted off) 67'
CF	9	(Argentina) Gonzalo Higuaín	(yellow card) 120+1'
CF	17	(Croatia) Mario Mandžukić
Substitutes:
GK	25	(Brazil) Neto
GK	32	(Italy) Emil Audero
DF	4	(Morocco) Medhi Benatia
DF	15	(Italy) Andrea Barzagli
DF	33	(France) Patrice Evra		(substituted on) 32'
DF	40	(Italy) Luca Coccolo
MF	7	(Colombia) Juan Cuadrado
MF	11	(Brazil) Hernanes
MF	18	(Gabon) Mario Lemina		(substituted on) 79'
MF	20	(Croatia) Marko Pjaca
MF	22	(Ghana) Kwadwo Asamoah
FW	21	(Argentina) Paulo Dybala		(substituted on) 67'
Manager:
(Italy) Massimiliano Allegri

GK	99	(Italy) Gianluigi Donnarumma
RB	20	(Italy) Ignazio Abate (c)		(substituted off) 102'
CB	29	(Italy) Gabriel Paletta
CB	13	(Italy) Alessio Romagnoli	(yellow card) 43'
LB	2	(Italy) Mattia De Sciglio	(yellow card) 70'
RM	91	(Italy) Andrea Bertolacci
CM	73	(Italy) Manuel Locatelli		(substituted off) 73'
LM	33	(Slovakia) Juraj Kucka	(yellow card) 59'
RW	8	(Spain) Suso
CF	70	(Colombia) Carlos Bacca		(substituted off) 102'
LW	5	(Italy) Giacomo Bonaventura
Substitutes:
GK	1	(Brazil) Gabriel
DF	15	(Paraguay) Gustavo Gómez
DF	17	(Colombia) Cristián Zapata
DF	31	(Italy) Luca Antonelli		(substituted on) 102'
MF	10	(Japan) Keisuke Honda
MF	14	(Chile) Matías Fernández
MF	16	(Italy) Andrea Poli
MF	23	(Argentina) José Sosa
MF	80	(Croatia) Mario Pašalić		(substituted on) 73'
FW	7	(Brazil) Luiz Adriano
FW	9	(Italy) Gianluca Lapadula		(substituted on) 102'
FW	11	(France) M'Baye Niang
Manager:
(Italy) Vincenzo Montella

Assistant referees:
Riccardo Di Fiore
Alessandro Giallatini
Fourth official:
Marco Barbirati
Additional assistant referees:
Paolo Valeri
Carmine Russo

Match rules

- 90 minutes.
- 30 minutes of extra time if necessary.
- Penalty shoot-out if scores still level.
- Twelve named substitutes, of which up to three may be used.

== See also ==
- 2016–17 Serie A
- 2016–17 Coppa Italia
- 2016–17 AC Milan season
- 2016–17 Juventus FC season
- Juventus FC–AC Milan rivalry

Played between same clubs:

- 2003 Supercoppa Italiana
- 2018 Supercoppa Italiana
