= Matías Fernández (footballer, born 1986) =

Chilean footballer (born 1986)

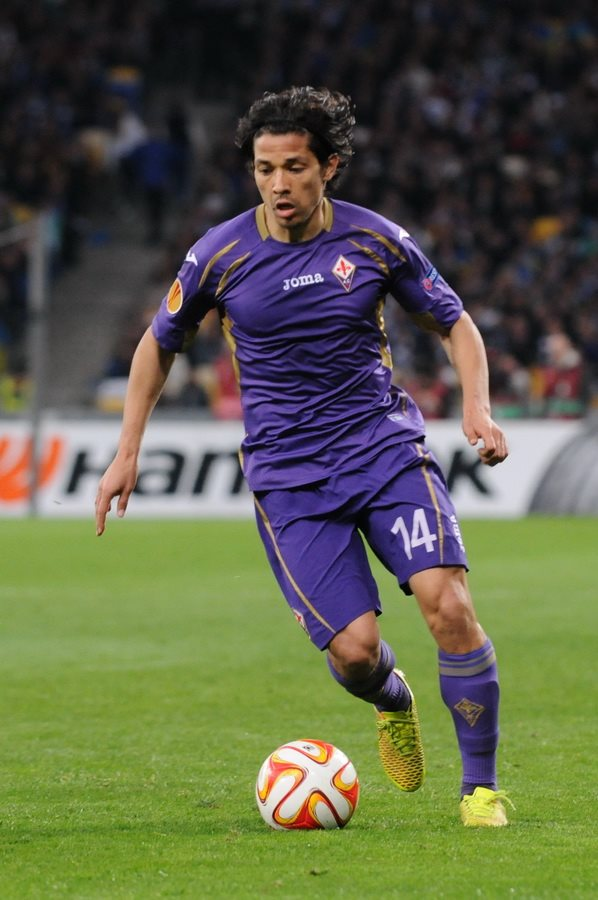
- Fernández with Fiorentina in 2015

Personal information
- Full name: Matías Ariel Fernández Fernández
- Date of birth: 15 May 1986 (age 40)
- Place of birth: Caballito, Argentina
- Height: 1.78 m (5 ft 10 in)
- Position: Attacking midfielder

Youth career
- 1996–1998: Unión La Calera
- 1998–2004: Colo-Colo

Senior career*
Years	Team	Apps	(Gls)
2004–2006	Colo-Colo	82	(37)
2006–2009	Villarreal	71	(7)
2009–2012	Sporting CP	69	(12)
2012–2017	Fiorentina	96	(7)
2016–2017	→ AC Milan (loan)	13	(1)
2017–2019	Necaxa	37	(4)
2019	Atlético Junior	11	(1)
2020–2021	Colo-Colo	19	(0)
2021–2022	Deportes La Serena	39	(3)
Total		437	(72)

International career
2005	Chile U20	13	(5)
2005–2018	Chile	74	(14)
Medal record
Representing Chile
Winner	Copa América	2015
- * Club domestic league appearances and goals

Matías Ariel Fernández Fernández (Spanish pronunciation: [maˈti.as aˈɾjel feɾˈnandes feɾˈnandes]; born 15 May 1986) is a Chilean former professional footballer who played as an attacking midfielder. He was known for his dribbling skills, also being a free kick specialist.

After starting out at Colo-Colo, he spent several seasons with Villarreal, Sporting CP and Fiorentina, having moved to Europe in 2006. He also played professionally in Mexico and Colombia.

Fernández was elected South American Footballer of the Year in 2006 and appeared for the Chile national team in the 2010 World Cup and three Copa América tournaments, winning the 2015 edition of the latter tournament.

== Early life ==
Fernández was born in the Caballito neighbourhood in Buenos Aires to an Argentine mother, Mirtha, and Chilean father Humberto. He moved to La Calera, Chile, at the age of 4.

== Club career ==
=== Colo-Colo ===
Fernández began with the youth squads of Colo-Colo at the age of 12. His debut in the Primera División came on 1 August 2004 against Club Universidad de Chile, and a week later he scored his first two goals, against Cobresal.

Fernández would go on to net a total of eight goals in the 2004 Clausura, and was named best young player of the season. In the 2006 Apertura he helped his team capture their 24th title and, in December of the same year, he helped them reach the final of the Copa Sudamericana, losing to C.F. Pachuca of Mexico, by scoring nine times in six games for the tournament. He left on a high note, winning the 2006 Clausura tournament and the South American Footballer of the Year award.

=== Villarreal ===
In late October 2006, Fernández was signed by Spanish club Villarreal CF for a fee of €8.7 million, joining compatriot Manuel Pellegrini who was the coach. The transaction was made before he received the "South American Player of the Year" award and, despite reports that Real Madrid and Chelsea were also interested, he agreed to terms and arrived at the Valencia airport on 27 December; on 7 January 2007 he made his La Liga debut in a 0–1 home loss against Valencia CF, scoring his first competitive goal three months later in the 3–0 league win at Gimnàstic de Tarragona.

Despite having had a buyout clause of €50 million inserted in his contract, Fernández failed to achieve significant playing time during his first three seasons, but still contributed 30 matches and three goals in 2007–08 as the side finished a best-ever runners-up. On 10 May 2009, he scored from a penalty kick in a 3–3 away draw against eventual champions FC Barcelona.

=== Sporting CP ===
On 1 July 2009, after being deemed surplus to requirements by new Villarreal manager Ernesto Valverde, Fernández joined Sporting CP on a four-year contract, for €3.65 million, with a further €500,000 payable depending on appearances. Villarreal would retain 20% of the profit on any future sale of the player.

Fernández scored his first goal for his new team on 27 October 2009, in a 1–1 draw at Vitória de Guimarães, adding another the following week also in the Portuguese Primeira Liga, at home against C.S. Marítimo (again 1–1). In the UEFA Europa League he netted once more, in injury time of the Lions' 3–0 victory over Everton in the round of 16 (4–2 on aggregate).

Fernández remained an important attacking unit in 2011–12, under both Domingos Paciência and his successor Ricardo Sá Pinto. He scored three of his four league goals against U.D. Leiria, two in the 3–1 home win and the game's only in the second match through a free kick in the 101st minute – the game had been interrupted for nine minutes due to floodlights malfunction.

=== Fiorentina ===
On 27 July 2012, Fernández transferred to Italian club ACF Fiorentina for about €3.1 million, plus €1.5 million in bonuses. During his spell at the Stadio Artemio Franchi, he was consistently bothered by physical problems.

Fernández moved to fellow Serie A team AC Milan on 31 August 2016, on a season-long loan deal with an option to buy. He made his debut on 6 November, coming off the bench in the 2–1 away victory over U.S. Città di Palermo.

=== Later career ===
On 4 September 2017, free agent Fernández signed with Club Necaxa. On 4 February 2019 he joined Categoría Primera A defending champions Atlético Junior on a one-year contract, scoring a late equaliser on his debut 12 days later after coming on as a second-half substitute in the 1–1 home draw with Rionegro Águilas; he was named player of the match.

On 18 December 2019, Fernández returned to Colo-Colo by agreeing to a one-year deal with the option for a further season. The 36-year-old announced his retirement on 14 February 2023, after 11 months in the same league with Deportes La Serena.

== International career ==
Fernández captained the Chile team at the 2005 FIFA World Youth Championship, scoring a goal in the 7–0 rout of Honduras. Despite a second-round exit to the Netherlands he displayed overall good football, playing alongside Nicolás Canales, Carlos Villanueva and José Pedro Fuenzalida.

Also a former under-17 international, Fernández quickly established himself as an integral part of the full side, netting five times and appearing for the nation at the 2007 Copa América. After featuring prominently in the 2010 FIFA World Cup qualification campaign, he was selected for the finals in South Africa, playing – and starting – in the group stage against Honduras and Switzerland (both 1–0 wins), in an eventual last-16 exit.

In May 2014, Fernández underwent ankle surgery on his right foot, thus being unable to participate in that year's World Cup. He was included in the Chilean squad for the 2015 Copa América, being sent off in the opening match, a 2–0 win over Ecuador at the Estadio Nacional in Santiago; after having come as a 75th-minute substitute for Jorge Valdivia, he was one of four players on target in the final against Argentina, which ended 4–1 in a penalty shootout.

Fernández was initially named in the Copa América Centenario squad, but had to withdraw through injury and was replaced by Mark González as the nation again won the tournament.

== Post-retirement ==
In December 2024, Fernández graduated as a football manager at INAF (National Institute of Football, Sports and Physical Activity of Chile).

== Personal life ==
Fernández married his Chilean wife in March 2013, but the couple's first child had already been born in late 2008. He was fined for speeding when he was driving from Santiago to Viña del Mar to witness the baby's birth.

Before moving to Europe, Fernández was often compared to compatriot David Pizarro, who spent most of his professional career in Italy. His daughter Aylén became the Chilean pre-junior champion in two categories of speed skating in November 2025.

== Career statistics ==
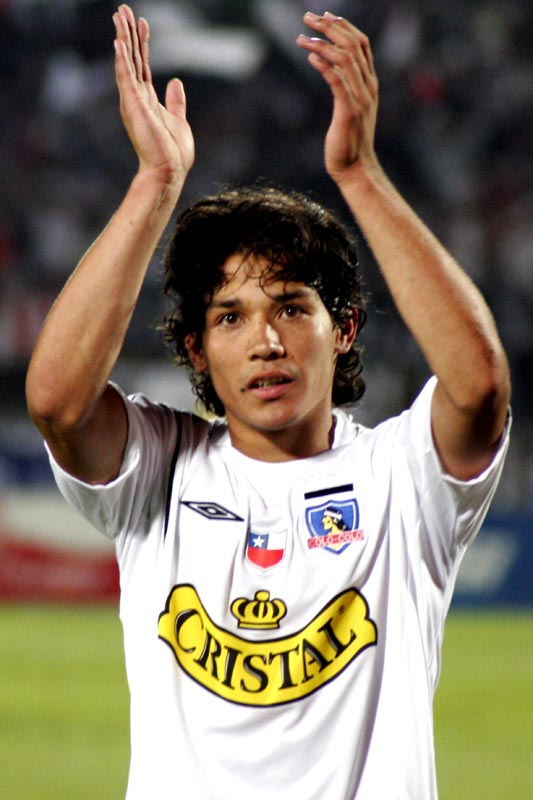
Fernández with Colo-Colo in 2006

=== Club ===
As of match played 16 February 2019

Club	Season	League			Cup		International		Total	
Club	Season	Division	Apps	Goals	Apps	Goals	Apps	Goals	Apps	Goals
Colo-Colo	2004	Primera División	23	8	0	0	0	0	23	8
Colo-Colo	2005	Primera División	29	9	0	0	0	0	29	9
Colo-Colo	2006	Primera División	30	20	0	0	0	0	30	20
Total			82	37	0	0	0	0	82	37
Villarreal	2006–07	La Liga	20	1	0	0	0	0	20	1
Villarreal	2007–08	La Liga	30	3	0	0	0	0	30	3
Villarreal	2008–09	La Liga	21	3	0	0	7	0	28	3
Total			71	7	0	0	7	0	78	7
Sporting CP	2009–10	Primeira Liga	28	3	5	1	13	1	46	5
Sporting CP	2010–11	Primeira Liga	21	5	2	0	6	2	29	7
Sporting CP	2011–12	Primeira Liga	20	4	7	0	11	3	38	7
Total			69	12	14	1	30	6	113	19
Fiorentina	2012–13	Serie A	22	1	3	0	0	0	25	1
Fiorentina	2013–14	Serie A	23	3	5	0	10	0	38	3
Fiorentina	2014–15	Serie A	29	2	4	0	8	0	41	2
Fiorentina	2015–16	Serie A	22	1	0	0	5	0	27	1
Total			96	7	12	0	23	0	131	7
AC Milan	2016–17	Serie A	13	1	0	0	0	0	13	1
Total			13	1	0	0	0	0	13	1
Necaxa	2017–18	Liga MX	20	1	4	1	0	0	24	2
Necaxa	2018–19	Liga MX	17	3	1	0	0	0	18	3
Total			37	4	5	1	0	0	42	5
Junior	2019	Primera A	1	1	0	0	0	0	1	1
Total			1	1	0	0	0	0	1	1
Career Total			369	69	31	2	60	6	460	77

=== International goals ===
#	Date	Venue	Opponent	Score	Result	Competition
1.	8 October 2006	Sausalito, Viña del Mar, Chile	Peru	1–1	3–2	Copa del Pacífico
2.	8 October 2006	Sausalito, Viña del Mar, Chile	Peru	2–1	3–2	Copa del Pacífico
3.	7 February 2007	José Pachencho Romero, Maracaibo, Venezuela	Venezuela	0–1	0–1	Friendly
4.	17 October 2007	Estadio Nacional, Santiago, Chile	Peru	2–0	2–0	2010 World Cup qualification
5.	10 September 2008	Estadio Nacional, Santiago, Chile	Colombia	4–0	4–0	2010 World Cup qualification
6.	29 March 2009	Monumental "U", Lima, Peru	Peru	1–3	1–3	2010 World Cup qualification
7.	6 June 2009	Defensores del Chaco, Asunción, Paraguay	Paraguay	0–1	0–2	2010 World Cup qualification
8.	26 March 2011	Magalhães Pessoa, Leiria, Portugal	Portugal	1–1	1–1	Friendly
9.	29 March 2011	Kyocera, The Hague, Netherlands	Colombia	0–1	0–2	Friendly
10.	19 June 2011	David Arellano, Santiago, Chile	Estonia	1–0	4–0	Friendly
11.	7 October 2011	Estadio Monumental, Buenos Aires, Argentina	Argentina	3–1	4–1	2014 World Cup qualification
12.	29 February 2012	PPL Park, Pennsylvania, United States	Ghana	1–1	1–1	Friendly
13.	9 June 2012	José Antonio Anzoátegui, Puerto La Cruz, Venezuela	Venezuela	0–1	0–2	2014 World Cup qualification
14.	11 September 2012	David Arellano, Santiago, Chile	Colombia	1–0	1–3	2014 World Cup qualification

== Honours ==
Colo-Colo

- Chilean Primera División: 2006 Apertura, 2006 Clausura
- Copa Chile: 2019
- Copa Sudamericana runner-up: 2006

Sporting CP

- Taça de Portugal runner-up: 2011–12

Fiorentina

- Coppa Italia runner-up: 2013–14

Milan

- Supercoppa Italiana: 2016

Necaxa

- Copa MX: Clausura 2018
- Supercopa MX: 2018

Junior

- Categoría Primera A: 2019–I

Chile

- Copa América: 2015

Individual

- South American Footballer of the Year: 2006
