= Juraj Kucka =

Slovak footballer (born 1987)

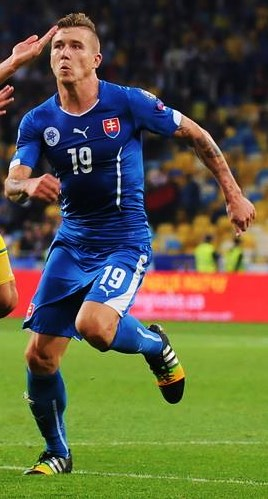
- Kucka playing for Slovakia in 2014

Personal information
- Full name: Juraj Kucka
- Date of birth: 26 February 1987 (age 39)
- Place of birth: Bojnice, Czechoslovakia
- Height: 1.86 m (6 ft 1 in)
- Position: Midfielder

Team information
- Current team: MTJ Pravenec

Youth career
- 2001–2002: Prievidza
- 2002–2004: Junior Radvaň
- 2004–2006: ŽP Šport Podbrezová

Senior career*
Years	Team	Apps	(Gls)
2005–2007	ŽP Šport Podbrezová	42	(3)
2007–2008	Ružomberok	48	(9)
2009–2011	Sparta Prague	45	(11)
2011–2015	Genoa	122	(9)
2015–2017	AC Milan	59	(4)
2017–2019	Trabzonspor	33	(3)
2019–2022	Parma	72	(17)
2021–2022	→ Watford (loan)	26	(1)
2022–2025	Slovan Bratislava	58	(9)
2025–2026	Baník Prievidza	7	(2)
2026–	MTJ Pravenec	0	(0)

International career^{‡}
2007–2008	Slovakia U21	11	(0)
2008–2024	Slovakia	112	(14)
- * Club domestic league appearances and goals as of 20:00, 8 June 2026 (UTC) ‡ National team caps and goals as of 20:30, 9 September 2024 (UTC)

Juraj Kucka (Slovak pronunciation: [ˈjuraj ˈkutska]; born 26 February 1987), also known by his nickname Kuco (Slovak pronunciation: [ˈkutsɔ]), is a Slovak footballer who plays as a midfielder for Slovak club MTJ Pravenec.

== Club career ==
=== Early career ===
Kucka made his Corgoň Liga debut for Ružomberok on 11 March 2007. He played six games in his first season. Overall, Kucka played 49 games and scored eight goals for Ružomberok.

Czech manager Michal Bílek, who managed Ružomberok in 2008, recommended Kucka to sign for AC Sparta Prague. The footballer eventually signed a three-year contract for said club in January 2009. Kucka later scored a goal on his league debut against FC Vysočina Jihlava.

=== Genoa ===
In January 2011, Kucka joined Italian side Genoa for a fee of around €3.6 million, signing a contract for 4.5 years. He made his debut in the 3–2 Coppa Italia loss against Inter Milan on 12 January 2011, playing the whole match. La Gazzetta dello Sport wrote of him, after five appearances, that he was the club's second-best player behind Kakha Kaladze. He scored his first goal for Genoa in a 2–1 away victory against Lazio on 18 September 2011.

=== AC Milan ===
On 28 August 2015, Kucka was signed by AC Milan for €3 million transfer fee. However, Milan also paid an unknown parties an additional €1 million. He made his league debut on 29 August 2015 in a 2–1 home victory against Empoli, and scored his first Milan goal on 9 January 2016 to equalize against AS Roma in a 1–1 draw.

=== Trabzonspor ===
On 7 July 2017, Kucka was signed by Trabzonspor on a three-year contract worth €2.25 million a season, for a transfer fee of €5 million.

=== Parma ===
Kucka joined Parma upon returning to Italy on 14 January 2019, stating that he intended to score more goals in Parma and improve from where he left off, when he left Italy a year and a half ago.

Kucka debuted for Parma in his first opportunity, when he came on as a substitute for Alessandro Deiola in the 73rd minute of a Serie A away fixture against Udinese. Parma won the game 2–1 by goals of Roberto Inglese and Gervinho.

In his third appearance for Parma, Kucka got his first two assists with the side. On 2 February, he assisted Barillà in the 64th minute and Ivorian international Gervinho in the 74th minute. Parma had managed to upset Juventus away, who was on top of the league table, by coming back from a two-goal margin twice to tie the game 3–3. Kucka played 86 minutes of the game.

Kucka scored his first goal after the return to Italy in his fifth match, on 16 February 2019 against Cagliari after an assist from Massimo Gobbi, setting the score to 1–0 for Parma. However, two second-half goals by Leonardo Pavoletti meant Parma lost the game 2–1.

=== Watford ===
On 6 August 2021, it was announced that Kucka had signed for newly promoted Premier League club Watford. Parma confirmed on the same day that the transfer is a season-long loan.

On 14 August 2021, he made his Watford debut in their league opener against Aston Villa, where Watford won 3–2. He scored his first goal for the club in a 5–2 victory away against Everton.

=== Slovan Bratislava ===
Following Watford's relegation from the Premier League, Kucka signed a two-year contract with reigning Slovak champions of the past four seasons Slovan Bratislava, where he was coached by Vladimír Weiss under whom Kucka debuted in the Slovak national team and participated in 2010 FIFA World Cup. On 23 July 2022, Kucka marked his league debut with his first goal in a 4–0 victory against AS Trenčín.

On 26 November 2024, Kucka captained Slovan in the 2024–25 UEFA Champions League game against his former side AC Milan, with Davide Calabria, the only former teammate of his still at the club, as the opposing captain. He received a warm welcome and some chants of homage from the travelling Milan fans.

== International career ==
A former Slovakia under-21 player, Kucka made his senior international debut in a friendly match against Liechtenstein on 19 November 2008, replacing Branislav Obžera in the 53rd minute. He scored his first international against Austria in 2011.

Slovakia manager Vladimír Weiss called him up for the 2010 World Cup despite the fact that Kucka had not played in any qualification matches. He played in all three group stage matches against New Zealand, Italy and the Netherlands.

Kucka was called up to the Slovakia squads for the Euro 2016, Euro 2020 and Euro 2024 tournaments. In 2023, he played his 100th match during a UEFA Euro 2024 qualification against Portugal which saw the Slovaks losing 0–1.

On 10 March 2025, Kucka announced end of his international career due to health problems.

== Career statistics ==
=== Club ===
As of match played 17 May 2025

Appearances and goals by club, season and competition
Club	Season	League			Cup		Europe		Other		Total	
Club	Season	Division	Apps	Goals	Apps	Goals	Apps	Goals	Apps	Goals	Apps	Goals
Ružomberok	2006–07	Slovak Super Liga	6	0	—		—		—		6	0
Ružomberok	2007–08	Slovak Super Liga	24	5	—		—		—		24	5
Ružomberok	2008–09	Slovak Super Liga	18	3	—		—		—		18	3
Ružomberok	Total		48	8	—		—		—		48	8
Sparta Prague	2008–09	Czech First League	12	3	—		—		—		12	3
Sparta Prague	2009–10	Czech First League	20	5	2	0	5 (Note: Appearances in UEFA Europa League)	1	—		27	6
Sparta Prague	2010–11	Czech First League	13	3	—		11 (Note: Six appearances in UEFA Champions League, five appearances in UEFA Europa League)	2	—		24	5
Sparta Prague	Total		45	11	2	0	16	3	—		63	14
Genoa	2010–11	Serie A	17	0	1	0	—		—		18	0
Genoa	2011–12	Serie A	26	2	1	0	—		—		27	2
Genoa	2012–13	Serie A	33	3	2	0	—		—		35	3
Genoa	2013–14	Serie A	11	2	1	0	—		—		12	2
Genoa	2014–15	Serie A	34	2	0	0	—		—		34	2
Genoa	2015–16	Serie A	1	0	0	0	—		—		1	0
Genoa	Total		122	9	5	0	—		—		127	9
AC Milan	2015–16	Serie A	29	1	5	0	—		—		34	1
AC Milan	2016–17	Serie A	30	3	2	1	—		1 (Note: Appearance in Supercoppa Italiana)	0	33	4
AC Milan	Total		59	4	7	1	—		1	0	67	5
Trabzonspor	2017–18	Süper Lig	25	3	3	0	—		—		28	3
Trabzonspor	2018–19	Süper Lig	8	0	2	0	—		—		10	0
Trabzonspor	Total		33	3	5	0	—		—		38	3
Parma	2018–19	Serie A	18	4	0	0	—		—		18	4
Parma	2019–20	Serie A	26	6	2	0	—		—		28	6
Parma	2020–21	Serie A	28	7	0	0	—		—		28	7
Parma	Total		72	17	2	0	—		—		74	17
Watford (loan)	2021–22	Premier League	26	1	1	0	—		—		27	1
Slovan Bratislava	2022–23	Slovak First League	28	6	7	0	15 (Note: Four appearances in UEFA Champions League, two appearances in UEFA EUropa League, nine appearances and two goals in UEFA Conference League)	2	—		50	8
Slovan Bratislava	2023–24	Slovak First League	23	3	2	0	14 (Note: Four appearances in UEFA Champions League, two appearances in UEFA Europa League, eight appearances and two goals in UEFA Conference League)	2	—		39	5
Slovan Bratislava	2024–25	Slovak First League	5	0	1	0	11 (Note: Appearances in UEFA Champions League)	0	—		17	0
Slovan Bratislava	Total		56	9	10	0	40	4	—		106	13
Career total			452	61	32	1	56	7	1	0	541	69

=== International ===
As of match played 8 September 2024

Appearances and goals by national team and year
National team	Year	Apps	Goals
Slovakia	2008	1	0
Slovakia	2009	4	0
Slovakia	2010	9	0
Slovakia	2011	6	1
Slovakia	2012	6	0
Slovakia	2013	9	1
Slovakia	2014	4	2
Slovakia	2015	6	0
Slovakia	2016	9	2
Slovakia	2017	3	0
Slovakia	2018	7	1
Slovakia	2019	8	2
Slovakia	2020	7	1
Slovakia	2021	11	0
Slovakia	2022	5	1
Slovakia	2023	9	2
Slovakia	2024	8	1
Total		112	14

Scores and results list Slovakia's goal tally first, score column indicates score after each Kucka goal.

List of international goals scored by Juraj Kucka
No.	Date	Venue	Cap	Opponent	Score	Result	Competition
1	10 August 2011	Wörthersee Stadion, Klagenfurt, Austria	17	Austria	1–0	2–1	Friendly
2	15 November 2013	Stadion Miejski, Wrocław, Poland	35	Poland	1–0	2–0	Friendly
3	9 October 2014	Štadión pod Dubňom, Žilina, Slovakia	37	Spain	1–0	2–1	UEFA Euro 2016 qualification
4	15 November 2014	Philip II Arena, Skopje, Macedonia	39	Macedonia	1–0	2–0	UEFA Euro 2016 qualification
5	29 May 2016	WWK Arena, Augsburg, Germany	46	Germany	3–1	3–1	Friendly
6	11 November 2016	Štadión Antona Malatinského, Trnava, Slovakia	54	Lithuania	2–0	4–0	2018 FIFA World Cup qualification
7	16 November 2018	Štadión Antona Malatinského, Trnava, Slovakia	64	Ukraine	2–0	4–1	2018–19 UEFA Nations League B
8	11 June 2019	Bakcell Arena, Baku, Azerbaijan	67	Azerbaijan	2–0	5–1	UEFA Euro 2020 qualification
9	10 October 2019	Štadión Antona Malatinského, Trnava, Slovakia	70	Wales	1–1	1–1	UEFA Euro 2020 qualification
10	12 November 2020	Windsor Park, Belfast, Northern Ireland	77	Northern Ireland	1–0	2–1 (a.e.t.)	UEFA Euro 2020 qualification
11	17 November 2022	City Stadium, Podgorica, Montenegro	95	Montenegro	2–0	2–2	Friendly
12	17 June 2023	Laugardalsvöllur, Reykjavík, Iceland	98	Iceland	1–0	2–1	UEFA Euro 2024 qualification
13	16 November 2023	Tehelné pole, Bratislava, Slovakia	103	Iceland	1–0	4–2	UEFA Euro 2024 qualification
14	9 June 2024	Štadión Antona Malatinského, Trnava, Slovakia	107	Wales	1–0	4–0	Friendly

== Honours ==
Sparta Prague

- Czech First League: 2009–10
- Czech Supercup: 2010

AC Milan

- Supercoppa Italiana: 2016

Individual

- Slovak Super Liga Team of the Season: 2022–23

== See also ==
- List of men's footballers with 100 or more international caps
