= Mattia De Sciglio =

Italian footballer (born 1992)

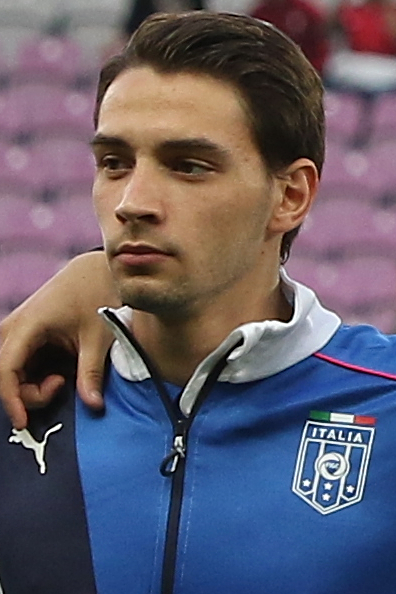
- De Sciglio with Italy in 2015

Personal information
- Full name: Mattia De Sciglio
- Date of birth: 20 October 1992 (age 34)
- Place of birth: Milan, Italy
- Height: 1.82 m (6 ft 0 in)
- Position: Right-back

Youth career
- 2001–2002: Cimiano
- 2002–2012: Milan

Senior career*
Years	Team	Apps	(Gls)
2011–2017	Milan	110	(0)
2017–2025	Juventus	82	(2)
2020–2021	→ Lyon (loan)	29	(0)
2024–2025	→ Empoli (loan)	16	(1)

International career
2010–2011	Italy U19	8	(1)
2011–2012	Italy U20	6	(0)
2012	Italy U21	5	(0)
2013–2022	Italy	40	(0)
Medal record
Men's Football
Representing Italy
FIFA Confederations Cup
Third place	2013 Brazil
- * Club domestic league appearances and goals as of 25 May 2025 (UTC)

Mattia De Sciglio (Italian pronunciation: [matˈtiːa de ʃˈʃiʎʎo]; born 20 October 1992) is an Italian professional footballer who plays as a right-back.

De Sciglio made his professional debut for Milan in 2011, after several seasons in the club's youth system, and subsequently became a regular in the line-up, being able to play as either right or left back, winning two Supercoppa Italiana titles. He joined Juventus in 2017, winning a domestic double in his first season with the club, followed by two more consecutive Serie A titles and a Supercoppa Italiana.

At international level, De Sciglio made his senior debut for Italy in March 2013 and he was selected in the Italian squads for the 2013 FIFA Confederations Cup, 2014 FIFA World Cup and the UEFA Euro 2016.

== Club career ==
=== Early career ===
A native of Milan, De Sciglio started playing football as a child at the Santa Chiara e San Francesco parish recreation centre in the nearby municipality of Rozzano, before moving to local amateur team Cimiano in 2001.

=== Milan ===
The following year, aged ten, De Sciglio joined AC Milan's youth system, where he spent nine seasons. In 2010, he was a member of the under-19 squad who won the Coppa Italia Primavera, 25 years after the team's last success in the competition.

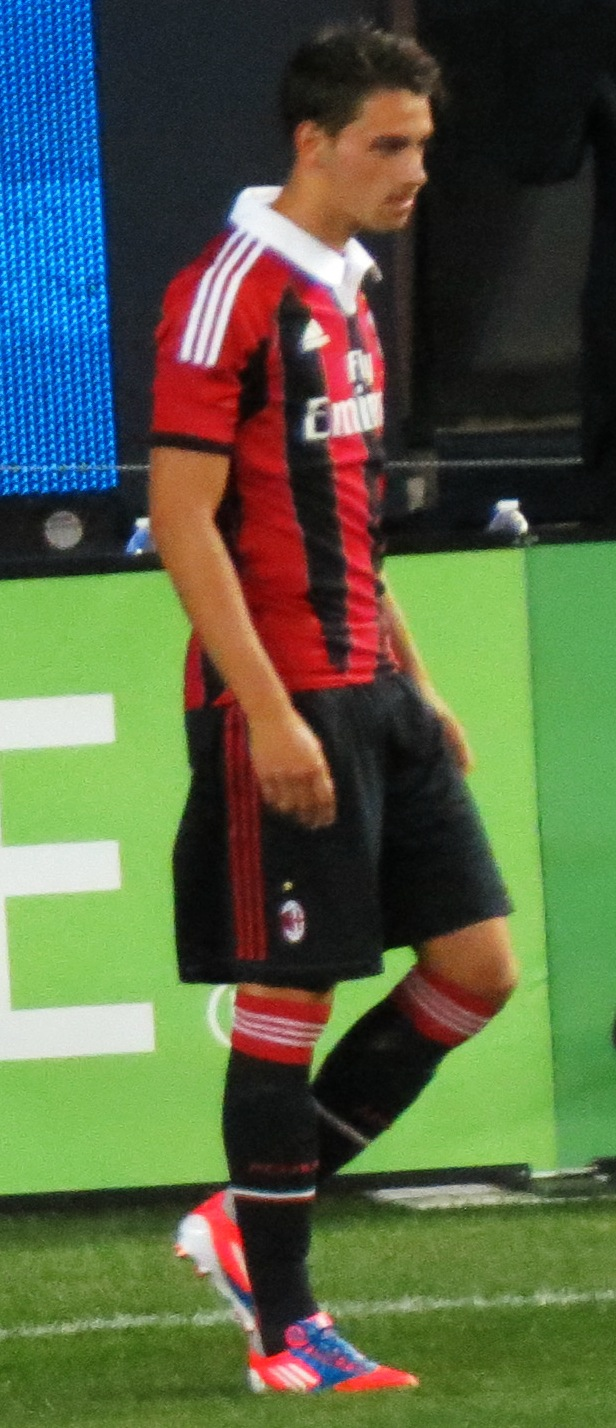
De Sciglio in action for Milan.

At the start of the 2011–12 season De Sciglio was officially included in the first team squad by manager Massimiliano Allegri. He made his professional debut on 28 September 2011, coming on as a substitute in a UEFA Champions League group stage home game against Viktoria Plzeň, which Milan won 2–0. He was given his first start (and second overall appearance) in a 2–2 away draw against the same team on 6 December. Four months later, on 10 April, De Sciglio also made his league debut, playing as a starter in a 1–0 away win over Chievo. The following month, on 6 May, he played in his first Milan derby against city rivals Inter, replacing an injured Daniele Bonera midway through the first half of a 4–2 loss.

As from the 2012–13 season De Sciglio was assigned the number 2 shirt, which he called "very important" as in the past it was worn "by great players like Mauro Tassotti and Cafu", adding that he hoped to "live up to their standards". Throughout the season, De Sciglio became a regular in the starting line-up thanks to a series of convincing performances. He made 33 appearances in the 2012–13 season, managing three assists in the process. He played as both a left back and right back, showing competence on either flank.

The 2013–14 season was a frustrating one for De Sciglio. He missed 20 matches in total due to various injuries which limited him to making just 21 appearances for the season in all competitions. On 18 May, De Sciglio was sent off in Milan's game against Sassuolo. De Sciglio healed in time to participate with his national side Italy in the 2014 FIFA World Cup in Brazil.

De Sciglio made 18 appearances for Milan in the 2014–15 season as he struggled with injury and vied with Ignazio Abate for the starting right-back spot. Towards the end of the season, however, he started to fall into Filippo Inzaghi's favor and began to start most games. Despite this, he also received criticism due to a perceived lack of discipline, particularly citing the 3–0 loss to Napoli on 3 May, where De Sciglio conceded a penalty (saved by Diego López) and was sent off in the first minute of the match for a foul in the penalty area.

Inzaghi's replacement as coach, Siniša Mihajlović, has firmly established De Sciglio in the right-back position, having started him in almost every game this season, mostly replacing Abate on the right-back but also playing in place of the injured left-back Luca Antonelli. On 6 March 2016, De Sciglio made his 100th Milan appearance, being given the captain's armband to mark the occasion, in a 2–0 away loss to Sassuolo.

Following impressive performances at UEFA Euro 2016, it was reported that Milan had rejected a €15 million offer from Napoli.

Under the new Milan manager Vincenzo Montella, De Sciglio started almost every match, mostly as a left-back. On 23 December 2016, he started the match against Juventus in the Supercoppa Italiana, which Milan went on to win 4–3 in a penalty shoot-out, with De Sciglio winning his second Supercoppa Italiana title.

=== Juventus ===
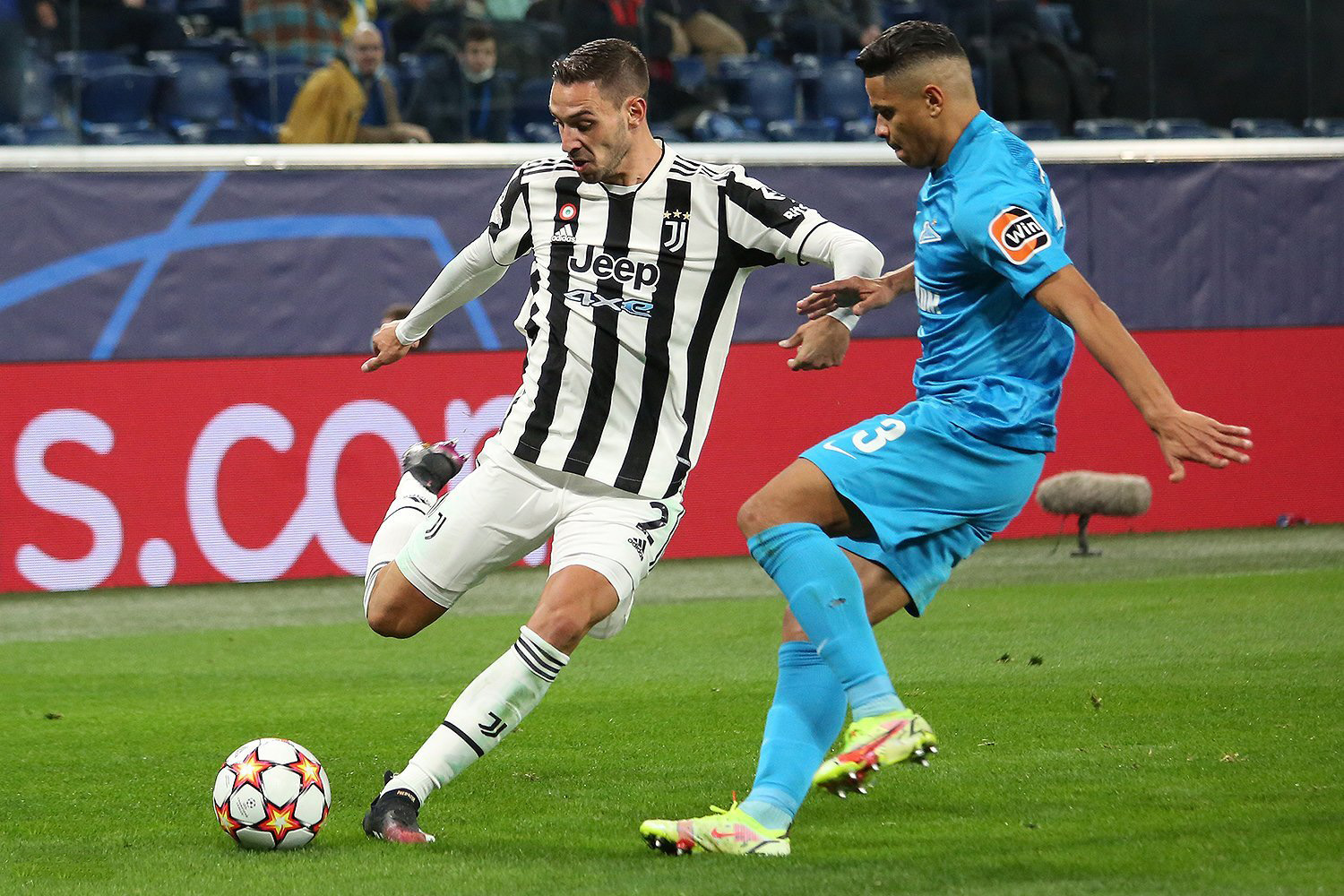
De Sciglio (left) with Juventus in 2021

On 20 July 2017, De Sciglio joined Juventus for €12 million on a five-year contract. On 13 August, he made his club debut, coming on as a substitute in a 3–2 defeat to Lazio in the 2017 Supercoppa Italiana. On 26 November, De Sciglio scored his first ever goal, in a 3–0 home win over Crotone. After struggling in his later seasons at Milan to replicate the promising performances he had shown in his early years at the club, De Sciglio's form improved significantly after his move to Juventus, and his consistent defensive performances drew praise in the media.

De Sciglio missed the first part of the 2018–19 season after picking up an injury during the pre-season. He returned to action on 27 October 2018, in a 2–1 away win over Empoli in Serie A.

On 9 January 2022, De Sciglio scored the winning goal in a 4–3 win against Roma, and scored his second league goal of his career. On 16 June, Juventus announced De Sciglio had renewed his contract until 30 June 2025.

==== Lyon (loan) ====
On 5 October 2020, De Sciglio was signed by Lyon on a season-long loan.

==== Empoli (loan) ====
On 29 August 2024, De Sciglio was signed on a one-year loan by Empoli.

== International career ==
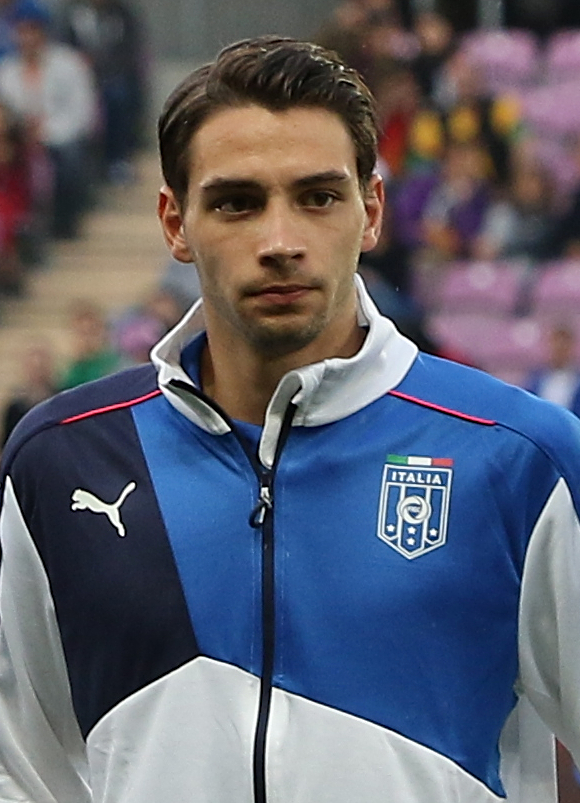
De Sciglio playing with Italy in 2015.

De Sciglio won eight caps for Italy under-19 between 2010 and 2011, including two appearances and one goal in the 2011 UEFA European Under-19 Football Championship qualifying round. Subsequently, he represented Italy under-20, winning five caps between 2011 and 2012. On 25 April 2012, he made his debut for Italy under-21, coming on as a substitute midway through the second half of a friendly match against Scotland, which Italy won 4–1. For the under-21 side, he went on to make four further appearances, all in 2012.

Less than four months after making his debut for the under-21 side, De Sciglio received his first call-up to the Italy senior team, as manager Cesare Prandelli named him to the squad for a friendly match against England to be played on 15 August 2012. However, he was left as an unused substitute in the 2–1 defeat. He went on to make his debut for the senior team on 21 March 2013, in a friendly match against Brazil that ended in a 2–2 draw.

At the 2013 FIFA Confederations Cup De Sciglio played in four games out of five, including the third-place match against Uruguay that Italy won on penalties following a 2–2 draw after extra time, even though De Sciglio had missed his spot kick in the eventual 3–2 win.

After appearing in Italy's 2014 FIFA World Cup qualifying campaign, De Sciglio was chosen under Prandelli to take part at the 2014 FIFA World Cup. He made his World Cup debut during the tournament, starting in Italy's final group match against Uruguay, although Italy were eliminated in the first round following a 1–0 defeat.

On 31 May 2016, De Sciglio was named to Antonio Conte's 23-man Italy squad for UEFA Euro 2016. After having been benched for Italy's first two games, he was highly praised for his performances in Italy's final group match against Republic of Ireland (a 1–0 loss) and Italy's round of 16 match against Spain (a 2–0 victory).

On 3 July 2016, he started the quarterfinal match against Germany; following a 1–1 draw after extra-time, he successfully converted his penalty in the resulting shoot-out, but Italy were eventually eliminated from the tournament by a 6–5 defeat.

== Style of play ==
De Sciglio is primarily a right-sided full-back or wing-back, who can also play comfortably on the left side due to his ability with his left foot as well as his stronger right foot; he has also been deployed as a wide midfielder on occasion, or even as a centre-back, a position which he formerly played in his youth. Former Milan player Alberigo Evani, who coached him during the 2007–08 season, described De Sciglio as "a fast runner, with good technique", and also as "a versatile footballer". Along with fellow Italian fullback Davide Santon, De Sciglio's precocious displays for Milan and the Italy national side led players, managers and pundits to describe him as the heir apparent of Paolo Maldini in 2013; he has also been compared to former Milan right-back Mauro Tassotti, who noted that De Sciglio reminded him of himself due to his athleticism and stamina. His managers have also praised him for his maturity, tenacity and composure, both when attacking or defending. A solid, defensive-minded full-back, he is mainly known for his consistency, decision-making, positioning, and tactical intelligence, as well as his ability to read the game and time his challenges.

== Career statistics ==
=== Club ===
As of match played 1 April 2025

Appearances and goals by club, season and competition
Club	Season	League			National cup (Note: Includes Coppa Italia, Coupe de France)		Europe		Other		Total	
Club	Season	Division	Apps	Goals	Apps	Goals	Apps	Goals	Apps	Goals	Apps	Goals
Milan	2011–12	Serie A	3	0	0	0	2 (Note: Appearances in UEFA Champions League)	0	0	0	5	0
Milan	2012–13	Serie A	27	0	1	0	5	0	—		33	0
Milan	2013–14	Serie A	16	0	2	0	3	0	—		21	0
Milan	2014–15	Serie A	17	0	1	0	—		—		18	0
Milan	2015–16	Serie A	22	0	7	0	—		—		29	0
Milan	2016–17	Serie A	25	0	1	0	—		1 (Note: Appearance in Supercoppa Italiana)	0	27	0
Milan	Total		110	0	12	0	10	0	1	0	133	0
Juventus	2017–18	Serie A	12	1	1	0	6	0	1	0	20	1
Juventus	2018–19	Serie A	22	0	2	0	4	0	0	0	28	0
Juventus	2019–20	Serie A	9	0	1	0	2	0	1	0	13	0
Juventus	2020–21	Serie A	1	0	0	0	0	0	0	0	1	0
Juventus	2021–22	Serie A	20	1	4	0	4	0	1	0	29	1
Juventus	2022–23	Serie A	17	0	2	0	6 (Note: Three appearances in UEFA Champions League, three appearances in UEFA Europa League)	0	—		25	0
Juventus	2023–24	Serie A	1	0	0	0	—		—		1	0
Juventus	Total		82	2	10	0	22	0	3	0	117	2
Lyon (loan)	2020–21	Ligue 1	29	0	4	0	—		—		33	0
Empoli (loan)	2024–25	Serie A	16	1	2	0	—		—		18	1
Career total			237	3	28	0	32	0	4	0	301	3

=== International ===
As of match played 29 March 2022

Appearances and goals by national team and year
National team	Year	Apps	Goals
Italy	2013	8	0
Italy	2014	8	0
Italy	2015	6	0
Italy	2016	8	0
Italy	2017	1	0
Italy	2018	6	0
Italy	2019	2	0
Italy	2020	0	0
Italy	2021	0	0
Italy	2022	1	0
Total		40	0

== Honours ==
Milan

- Supercoppa Italiana: 2016

Juventus

- Serie A: 2017–18, 2018–19, 2019–20
- Coppa Italia: 2017–18, 2023–24
- Supercoppa Italiana: 2018

Italy

- FIFA Confederations Cup third place: 2013

Individual

- Serie A Team of the Year: 2012–13
