= Andrea Bertolacci =

Italian professional footballer (born 1991)

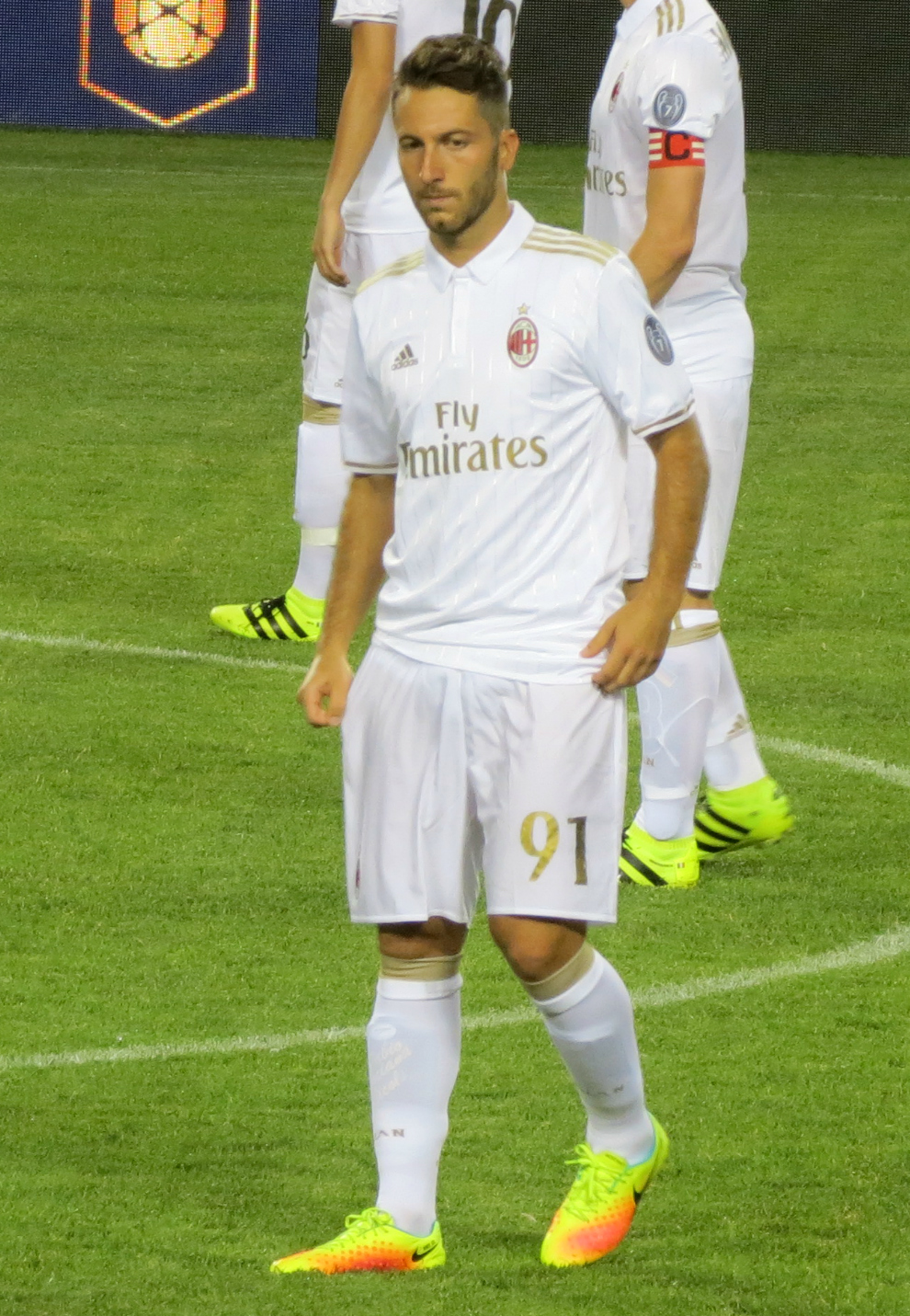
- Bertolacci with AC Milan in July 2016

Personal information
- Date of birth: 11 January 1991 (age 35)
- Place of birth: Rome, Italy
- Height: 1.79 m (5 ft 10 in)
- Position: Midfielder

Youth career
- 2006–2010: Roma

Senior career*
Years	Team	Apps	(Gls)
2009–2012	Roma	0	(0)
2010–2012	→ Lecce (loan)	43	(6)
2012–2015	Genoa	88	(12)
2015	Roma	0	(0)
2015–2019	AC Milan	44	(2)
2017–2018	→ Genoa (loan)	33	(1)
2019–2020	Sampdoria	12	(0)
2020–2021	Fatih Karagümrük	37	(9)
2022	Kayserispor	17	(2)
2022–2023	Fatih Karagümrük	14	(0)
2023–2025	Cremonese	6	(0)
2024	→ Fatih Karagümrük (loan)	15	(0)

International career
2006	Italy U16	2	(0)
2008	Italy U17	4	(0)
2009	Italy U18	1	(0)
2009–2010	Italy U19	6	(0)
2010–2011	Italy U20	2	(0)
2011–2013	Italy U21	7	(1)
2014–2015	Italy	5	(0)
- * Club domestic league appearances and goals as of 13 May 2025

Andrea Bertolacci (Italian pronunciation: [anˈdrɛːa bertoˈlattʃi]; born 11 January 1991) is an Italian professional footballer who plays as a midfielder.

Bertolacci began his career at Roma, and was signed by AC Milan in 2015. Following loans to Genoa and Sampdoria, in 2020 he moved to Turkish side Fatih Karagümrük. Having represented Italy at youth level, he made his debut for the senior national team in November 2014, in a friendly match against Albania.

== Club career ==
=== Roma ===
Bertolacci started his career with the Roma academy.

==== Loan to Lecce ====
In January 2010 he was sent on loan to Serie A team, Lecce. He scored the first goal for Lecce against Juventus a game in which he scored a brace. In summer 2010, Lecce extended the loan and borrowed Simone Sini also from Roma.

On 22 June 2011, Lecce excised the option to purchase 50% of his registration rights for a pre-agreed fee of €500,000. However, Roma excised the rights against the option for €500,000. Thus, Lecce received €500,000 in net as an incentive for the loan. Then Bertolacci was loaned for another season to Lecce, in order to play as a regular and gain more experience.

Bertolacci scored against his parent club in a 2–1 defeat on 20 November 2011. On 30 June 2012, he returned to Roma.

=== Genoa ===
In summer 2012 he was involved in the deal to sign Genoa's Panagiotis Tachtsidis. 50% of Bertolacci's player rights were tagged for €1 million and also 50% of Tachtsidis's rights for €2.5 million.

On 20 June 2014, Roma and Genoa renewed their co-ownership contract agreement with Bertolacci.

The 2014–15 season with Genoa was Bertolacci's best season of his career. He scored 6 goals in 34 matches of Serie A, producing 8 assists and helping his team reaching 6th place in the league.

=== AC Milan ===
In June 2015, Roma bought the other part of Bertolacci's player rights from Genoa for a sum of €8.5m. Subsequently, on 29 June 2015, Bertolacci joined fellow Serie A club AC Milan for €20m.

He scored his first Serie A goal for Milan in a 3–1 away win over Lazio on 1 November 2015.

=== Sampdoria ===
On 8 October 2019, Bertolacci signed for Sampdoria until 30 June 2020.

=== Fatih Karagümrük ===
On 23 December 2020, Bertolacci signed for Süper Lig club Fatih Karagümrük.

=== Kayserispor ===
On 14 January 2022, Bertolacci joined Kayserispor on a two-and-a-half-year. On 3 December 2022, he terminated his contract with the club citing unpaid wages.

=== Return to Fatih Karagümrük ===
On 27 December 2022, Bertolacci re-joined Fatih Karagümrük on a one-and-a-half-year deal.

=== Cremonese ===
On 21 July 2023, Bertolacci signed a two-year contract with Cremonese.

==== Second return to Fatih Karagümrük ====
On 29 December 2023, Cremonese announced that Bertolacci was loaned back to Fatih Karagümrük.

== International career ==
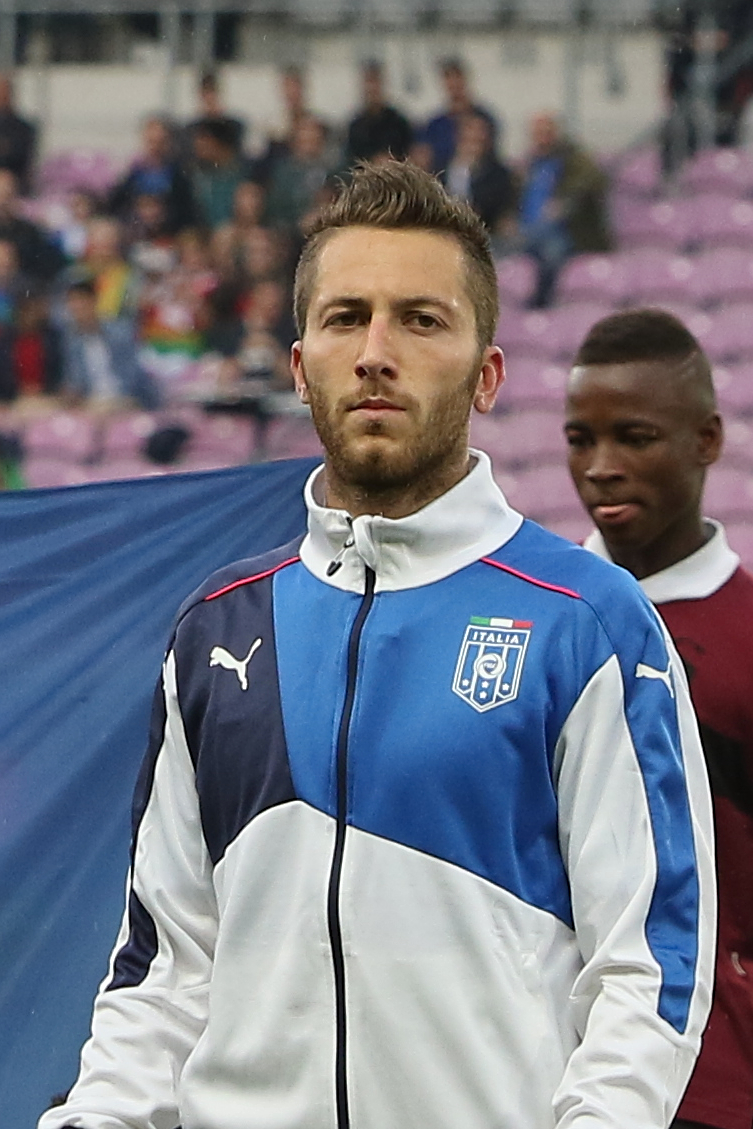
Bertolacci playing with Italy in 2015

=== Youth ===
Bertolacci started his international experience in Val-de-Marne under-16 international tournament. He played all 3 matches of the 2008 UEFA European Under-17 Football Championship elite qualification, in which Italy did not qualify to the next round. He was then promoted to the U19 team in January 2009 (as a consequence of the early exit of U-19 born 1990 team), played twice in 2010 UEFA European Under-19 Football Championship elite qualification and once in the elite round. He was also selected for the final stage, playing twice as starter. During the 2010–11 season he was capped twice for the U20 team in the Four Nations Tournament.

In April 2011 he received his first under-21 call-up. However, he was injured and missed the friendly. On 10 August 2011 he made his debut with the Italy U21 team, in a friendly match against Switzerland.

On 11 June 2013, Bertolacci scored a 94th-minute equaliser – his first goal for the under-21s – against Norway in the European U-21 Championships to ensure Italy topped their group. Italy went on to reach the final, though Bertolacci did not feature.

=== Senior ===
On 9 November 2014, he was called up by Antonio Conte to the senior squad ahead of a UEFA Euro 2016 qualifying match against Croatia and a friendly against Albania. On 18 November, he made his debut with senior team against Albania, playing for 70 minutes in a 1–0 win at Stadio Luigi Ferraris. On 28 March 2015, Bertolacci made his second appearance for Italy in a Euro 2016 qualifying match against Bulgaria in Sofia which finished 2–2.

== Style of play ==
Bertolacci is a quick and versatile midfielder, capable of playing in several positions both offensively and defensively. A left-footed player, he is usually deployed as a creative attacking midfielder, although he is also capable of playing as a central midfielder, or as a mezzala.

== Personal life ==
Bertolacci married actress Nicole Murgia on 23 December 2015 and is brother-in-law with her brother, Alessandro, who is also a footballer.

== Career statistics ==
=== Club ===
As of match played 9 August 2024

Appearances and goals by club, season and competition
Club	Season	League			National cup (Note: Includes Coppa Italia, Turkish Cup.)		Europe		Other		Total	
Club	Season	Division	Apps	Goals	Apps	Goals	Apps	Goals	Apps	Goals	Apps	Goals
Lecce (loan)	2009–10	Serie B	6	0	0	0	—		—		6	0
Lecce (loan)	2010–11	Serie A	9	3	1	1	—		—		10	4
Lecce (loan)	2011–12	Serie A	28	3	0	0	—		—		28	3
Lecce (loan)	Total		43	6	1	1	—		—		44	7
Genoa	2012–13	Serie A	29	4	0	0	—		—		29	4
Genoa	2013–14	Serie A	25	2	1	0	—		—		26	2
Genoa	2014–15	Serie A	34	6	1	0	—		—		35	6
Genoa	Total		88	12	2	0	—		—		90	12
AC Milan	2015–16	Serie A	27	1	3	0	—		—		30	1
AC Milan	2016–17	Serie A	17	1	2	0	—		1 (Note: Appearance in Supercoppa Italiana)	0	20	1
AC Milan	2018–19	Serie A	0	0	0	0	4	0	—		4	0
AC Milan	Total		44	2	5	0	4	0	1	0	54	2
Genoa (loan)	2017–18	Serie A	33	1	1	0	—		—		34	1
Sampdoria	2019–20	Serie A	12	0	0	0	—		—		12	0
Fatih Karagümrük	2020–21	Süper Lig	22	2	0	0	—		—		22	2
Fatih Karagümrük	2021–22	Süper Lig	15	7	0	0	—		—		15	7
Fatih Karagümrük	Total		36	9	0	0	0	0	0	0	36	9
Kayserispor	2021–22	Süper Lig	10	1	4	0	—		—		14	1
Kayserispor	2022–23	Süper Lig	7	1	1	0	—		—		8	1
Kayserispor	Total		17	2	5	0	0	0	0	0	22	2
Fatih Karagümrük	2022–23	Süper Lig	14	0	1	0	—		—		15	0
Cremonese	2023–24	Serie B	6	0	2	1	—		—		8	1
Fatih Karagümrük (loan)	2023–24	Süper Lig	15	0	3	0	—		—		18	0
Career total			309	32	20	2	4	0	1	0	334	34

=== International ===
As of 13 October 2015

Italy national team
Year	Apps	Goals
2014	1	0
2015	4	0
Total	5	0

== Honours ==
AC Milan

- Supercoppa Italiana: 2016
