= Claudio Bonanni =

Italian footballer (born 1997)

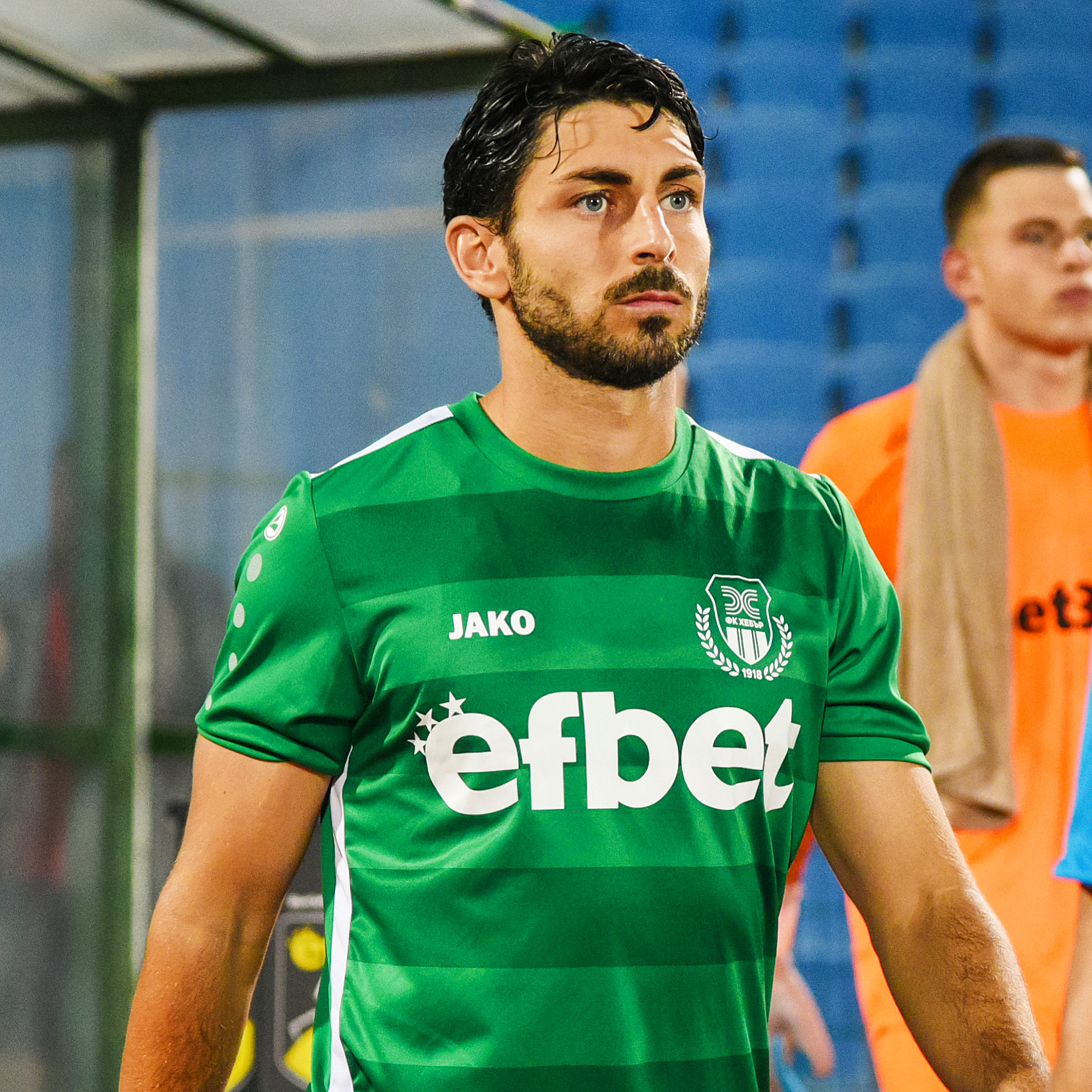

Personal information
- Date of birth: 5 March 1997 (age 29)
- Place of birth: Genova, Italy
- Height: 1.83 m (6 ft 0 in)
- Positions: Defender; defensive midfielder

Team information
- Current team: Paradiso
- Number: 23

Youth career
- –2015: Milan

Senior career*
Years	Team	Apps	(Gls)
2014–2017	Milan	0	(0)
2015–2016	→ Pavia (loan)	5	(0)
2016–2017	→ Varese (loan)	28	(0)
2017–2018	Folgore Caratese	27	(1)
2018–2019	FC Kamza	15	(1)
2019–2020	Castellanzese 1921	10	(1)
2020–2022	Birkirkara	64	(3)
2022–2023	Hebar	12	(0)
2023	Marsaxlokk	6	(1)
2023–2024	Hibernians	22	(1)
2024–2025	Paradiso	13	(0)
2025	Sangiuliano City	5	(0)
2025–2026	Vogherese	14	(1)
2026–	Pro Sesto	0	(0)
- * Club domestic league appearances and goals as of 11 March 2026

Claudio Bonanni (born 5 March 1997) is an Italian professional footballer who plays as a defender or a defensive midfielder for Serie D club Pro Sesto.

== Club career ==
Bonanni started his senior career with A.C. Milan. After that, he played for Pavia, Varese Calcio, and U.S. Folgore Caratese A.S.D. In 2018, he signed for Kamza in the Albanian Superliga, where he made eighteen appearances and scored one goal. In January 2020, he signed for Birkirkara in the BOV Premier League.

In July 2022, Bonanni joined Bulgarian club Hebar In the Bulgarian Parva Liga.

In January 2023, he signed for Marsaxlokk in the BOV Premier League.

In July of the same year, Bonanni joined Hibernians in the BOV Premier League.
