= Francesco Bordi =

Italian professional footballer

Personal information
- Full name: Francesco Bordi
- Date of birth: 28 January 1997 (age 29)
- Place of birth: Rome, Italy
- Position: Centre back

Team information
- Current team: Este

Youth career
- –2014: Roma
- 2014–2016: Milan

Senior career*
Years	Team	Apps	(Gls)
2016–2017	Siena	12	(0)
2017–2018	ArzignanoChiampo	24	(1)
2018	Città di Palombara	?	(0)
2018–2019	Città di Anagni	20	(0)
2020	Palestrina		
2020–	Este	7	(0)

International career
2012–2013	Italy U16	4	(0)
2013	Italy U17	0	(0)
2014	Italy U18	1	(0)
- * Club domestic league appearances and goals as of 17:38, 10 December 2020 (UTC)

Francesco Bordi (born 28 January 1997) is an Italian professional footballer who plays as a defender for A.C. Este in the Serie D. A left-footed central defender, he has also been deployed in both full-back positions.

== Club career ==
=== Early career ===
Bordi was born in Rome, Italy's capital city, and began his career in the youth side of local Serie A giants Roma. He played at various age levels of the Roma youth sector, but eventually moved to the under-19 side of Milan in 2014. He gradually became a solid member of the full Milan, and by 2016 had made nearly fifty appearances for the Rossoneri, registering one assist. Unlikely to break into the Milan first team, however, Bordi left the club in 2016, joining Siena in Lega Pro.

=== Siena ===
Bordi made his debut for Robur on 31 July 2016, just days after joining his new team, and played the full 90 minutes of a 0-3 Coppa Italia loss to Messina. Throughout his first season at the club, he was used as part of a squad rotation in either a central- or left-sided defensive role. After being included in the squad for the first 23 league games of the season, he was not dropped for the matchday 24 game against Como.

== National career ==
Bordi was first called into the Italy national setup in 2012, when he was included in coach Daniele Zoratto's under-16 squad for the international friendly against Switzerland. He played 66 minutes, and was booked. He made a further seven appearances at under-16 level, and registered an assist against Russia in a 3-1 win. He was called up to the under-17 squad but never made the field. Despite this, Bordi went on to be included in the under-18 squad for a game against Switzerland on 22 October 2014. He was substituted in to play the final 25 minutes of an eventual 0-1 loss.
