= Ivan De Santis =

Italian professional footballer

Personal information
- Full name: Ivan Francesco De Santis
- Date of birth: 21 May 1997 (age 29)
- Place of birth: Conversano, Italy
- Height: 1.88 m (6 ft 2 in)
- Position: Defender

Youth career
- –2016: Milan

Senior career*
Years	Team	Apps	(Gls)
2016–2017	Milan	0	(0)
2016–2017	→ Catania (loan)	2	(0)
2017	→ Paganese (loan)	15	(1)
2017–2019	Ascoli	26	(1)
2019	→ Virtus Entella (loan)	11	(0)
2019–2022	Virtus Entella	2	(0)
2020	→ Cesena (loan)	4	(0)
2021	→ Modena (loan)	5	(0)
2021–2022	→ Monopoli (loan)	0	(0)
2022	→ Paganese (loan)	15	(0)
2022–2023	Monopoli	28	(2)
2023–2025	Taranto	28	(0)
2024	→ Fermana (loan)	4	(0)
2025	Al Ittifaq		

International career^{‡}
2012	Italy U15	9	(1)
2012–2013	Italy U16	4	(0)
2013–2014	Italy U17	15	(3)
2014–2015	Italy U18	5	(0)
2015–2016	Italy U19	3	(2)
2016–2017	Italy U20	3	(0)
- * Club domestic league appearances and goals as of 21 February 2025 ‡ National team caps and goals as of 10 October 2017

Ivan Francesco De Santis (born 21 May 1997) is an Italian professional footballer who plays as a defender. A centre-back, he made his professional debut on 2 November 2016, for Catania.

== Career ==
=== Early career ===
De Santis was born in the Apulian town of Conversano, but began his career in Lombardy in the youth teams of Serie A giants Milan. His progression through the youth teams was rapid, and he became a starter for the Primavera side aged just 16. Despite playing against opponents often two years older than himself, De Santis impressed coaches whilst playing in the Campionato Nazionale Primavera and UEFA Youth League, and made over 60 appearances for the Primavera side in total.

=== Loan moves ===
De Santis was sent on loan to Lega Pro side Catania at the beginning of the 2016–17 season. Here, however, De Santis received little game time and made just three appearances. Due to this lack of playing time, Milan recalled De Santis early, in January 2017, in order to loan him out again. He signed a six-month loan contract with Paganese, also of Lega Pro, on 27 January 2017.

=== Ascoli ===
On 8 January 2019, he joined Virtus Entella on loan with an option to purchase.

=== Virtus Entella ===
He moved to Virtus permanently on 23 August 2019.

==== Loan to Cesena ====
On 20 January 2020, he joined Serie C club Cesena on loan until the end of the season.

==== Loan to Modena ====
On 14 January 2021, he was loaned to Serie C club Modena.

==== Loan to Monopoli ====
On 31 August 2021 he moved to Monopoli on loan with an obligation to buy.

==== Loan to Paganese ====
On 28 January 2022, he joined Paganese on a sub-loan from Monopoli.

=== Taranto ===
On 20 July 2023, De Santis signed a two-year contract with Taranto. On 26 January 2024, he was loaned by Fermana.

== National team ==
De Santis has played for every age category for Italy from under-15 to under-19, and also received a call-up to the under-20 side in September 2016 for the Under-20 Four Nations Tournament, after Fabio Della Giovanna was forced to withdraw due to injury.

== Career statistics ==
=== Club ===
Updated 1 January 2018

Club	League	Season	League		Cup		Europe		Other		Total	
Club	League	Season	Apps	Goals	Apps	Goals	Apps	Goals	Apps	Goals	Apps	Goals
Catania	Lega Pro	2016–17	2	0	1	0	–		–		3	0
Paganese	Lega Pro	2016–17	15	1	0	0	–		1	0	16	1
Ascoli	Serie B	2017–18	10	0	1	0	–		0	0	11	0
Total			27	1	2	0	–		1	0	30	1
