= Giorgio Piacentini =

Italian footballer (born 1997)

Personal information
- Date of birth: 30 April 1997 (age 29)
- Place of birth: Bergamo, Italy
- Height: 1.83 m (6 ft 0 in)
- Position: Defender

Team information
- Current team: Real Calepina

Youth career
- –2013: Albinese
- 2014–2015: Inter Milan
- 2014–2015: → AlbinoLeffe (loan)
- 2015–2016: AC Milan

Senior career*
Years	Team	Apps	(Gls)
2016–2017	Como	3	(0)
2017	Lusitano	6	(1)
2018	Pontisola	10	(0)
2018–2020	Grumellese		
2020–	Real Calepina	61	(2)

International career^{‡}
2012	Italy U15	1	(0)
2012–2013	Italy U16	4	(0)
2013–2014	Italy U17	4	(0)
2014–2015	Italy U18	3	(0)
- * Club domestic league appearances and goals as of 20 December 2023 ‡ National team caps and goals as of 19:24, 21 June 2019 (UTC)

Giorgio Piacentini (born 30 April 1997) is an Italian footballer who plays as a defender for Serie D club Real Calepina.

== Career statistics ==
=== Club ===
As of 29 May 2020.

Club	Season	League			Cup		Other		Total	
Club	Season	Division	Apps	Goals	Apps	Goals	Apps	Goals	Apps	Goals
Como	2016–17	Lega Pro	3	0	0	0	0	0	3	0
Lusitano	2017–18	Campeonato de Portugal	6	1	2 (Note: Appearances in the Taça de Portugal)	0	0	0	8	1
Pontisola	2017–18	Serie D	11	0	0	0	0	0	11	0
Grumellese	2018–19	Eccellenza	28	2	0	0	0	0	28	2
Career total			48	3	2	0	0	0	50	3
