= Antonio Damato =

Italian football referee

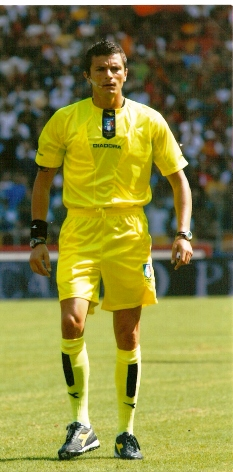
Antonio Damato

Antonio Damato (born 15 August 1972) is an ex-Italian football referee.

A lawyer by profession, Damato became a FIFA referee in 2010. He has served as a referee in the 2012–13 UEFA Europa League and during the 2014 World Cup qualifiers, beginning with the Group G match between Greece and Bosnia-Herzegovina. He ceased to be a FIFA referee in 2016 and retired from refereeing in Italian domestic football in 2018.
