= 2014–15 Empoli FC season =

Empoli
2014–15 season
- President: Fabrizio Corsi
- Manager: Maurizio Sarri
- Stadium: Stadio Carlo Castellani
- Serie A: 15th
- Coppa Italia: Round of 16
- Top goalscorer: League: Massimo Maccarone (10); All: Massimo Maccarone (10)
- Highest home attendance: 14,698 vs Juventus (1 November 2014, Serie A)
- Lowest home attendance: 1,470 vs Genoa (3 December 2014, Coppa Italia)
- Average home league attendance: 9,229
Home colours	Away colours	Third colours

The 2014–15 season was Empoli Football Club's first season in Serie A since the 2007–08 season. The team competed in both Serie A and the Coppa Italia.

== Players ==
=== Squad information ===
Note: Flags indicate national team as defined under FIFA eligibility rules; some limited exceptions apply. Players may hold more than one non-FIFA nationality.

No.	Pos.	Nation	Player
1	GK	ITA	Luca Castellazzi
2	DF	FRA	Vincent Laurini
5	MF	ITA	Davide Moro (captain)
6	MF	ITA	Mirko Valdifiori
7	MF	ITA	Massimo Maccarone
8	MF	VEN	Franco Signorelli
9	FW	GEO	Levan Mchedlidze
10	FW	ITA	Francesco Tavano
11	MF	ITA	Daniele Croce
16	GK	ITA	Matteo Biggeri
17	MF	ITA	Tiberio Guarente
18	MF	ITA	Simone Verdi (on loan from Torino)
19	DF	ITA	Federico Barba
20	FW	ITA	Manuel Pucciarelli

No.	Pos.	Nation	Player
21	DF	POR	Mário Rui
23	DF	ALB	Elseid Hysaj
24	DF	ITA	Daniele Rugani (on loan from Juventus)
25	DF	ITA	Matteo Bachini
26	DF	ITA	Lorenzo Tonelli
27	MF	ITA	Ludovico Gargiulo
28	GK	ITA	Davide Bassi
30	DF	ITA	Andrea Gemignani
33	GK	ITA	Luigi Sepe (on loan from Napoli)
58	DF	ITA	Luca Martinelli
77	FW	GEO	Irakli Shekiladze
95	FW	ITA	Emanuele Rovini
99	FW	URU	Rodrigo Aguirre (on loan from Udinese)

== Competitions ==
=== Serie A ===
==== League table ====
Pos	Team	Pld	W	D	L	GF	GA	GD	Pts
13	Hellas Verona	38	11	13	14	49	65	−16	46
14	Chievo	38	10	13	15	28	41	−13	43
15	Empoli	38	8	18	12	46	52	−6	42
16	Udinese	38	10	11	17	43	56	−13	41
17	Atalanta	38	7	16	15	38	57	−19	37

Source: 2014–15 Serie A, 2014-15 Serie A classification.
Rules for classification: 1) points; 2) head-to-head points; 3) head-to-head goal difference; 4) goal difference; 5) number of goals scored; 6) draw. (Head-to-head record is applied for clubs with the same number of points only once all matches between said clubs have been played.).

==== Results summary ====
Overall								Home						Away					
Pld	W	D	L	GF	GA	GD	Pts	W	D	L	GF	GA	GD	W	D	L	GF	GA	GD
38	8	18	12	46	52	−6	42	6	8	5	26	22	+4	2	10	7	20	30	−10

Last updated: 31 May 2015.
Source: Competitive matches

==== Results by round ====
Round	1	2	3	4	5	6	7	8	9	10	11	12	13	14	15	16	17	18	19	20	21	22	23	24	25	26	27	28	29	30	31	32	33	34	35	36	37	38
Ground	A	H	A	H	A	H	A	H	A	H	H	A	H	A	H	A	H	A	H	H	A	H	A	H	A	H	A	H	A	A	H	A	H	A	H	A	H	A
Result	L	L	D	D	D	W	D	L	L	L	W	W	D	D	D	D	D	L	D	L	D	W	D	W	D	D	D	W	L	L	D	D	W	W	L	L	D	L
Position	19	20	19	19	17	12	13	14	17	17	16	14	13	13	14	13	13	15	16	16	16	15	14	14	14	13	15	13	14	15	16	16	14	13	15	16	15	15

Updated to match(es) played on 31 May 2015. Source: Competitive matches
A = Away; H = Home; W = Win; D = Draw; L = Loss

==== Matches ====
31 August 2014 1	Udinese	2–0	Empoli	Udine
20:45 CEST (UTC+02:00)	Pasquale (yellow card) 39'; Di Natale 57', 62'; Badu (yellow card) 64'	Report	Croce (yellow card) 55'; Verdi (yellow card) 74'	Stadium: Stadio Friuli; Attendance: 7,889; Referee: Marco Di Bello

13 September 2014 2	Empoli	0–1	Roma	Empoli
18:00 CEST (UTC+02:00)		Report	Sepe 45+1' (o.g.); De Rossi (yellow card) 67'	Stadium: Stadio Carlo Castellani; Attendance: 11,118; Referee: Andrea Gervasoni

20 September 2014 3	Cesena	2–2	Empoli	Cesena
18:00 CEST (UTC+02:00)	Giorgi (yellow card) 24'; Marilungo 30'; Defrel 32', (yellow card) 77'; Cascione (yellow card) 51'; Lucchini (yellow card) 54'	Report	Tavano 55' (pen.); Rugani 72'; Vecino (yellow card) 76'	Stadium: Stadio Dino Manuzzi; Attendance: 14,073; Referee: Claudio Gavillucci

23 September 2014 4	Empoli	2–2	Milan	Empoli
20:45 CEST (UTC+02:00)	Tonelli 13'; Pucciarelli 21'; Vecino (yellow card) 42'; Valdifiori (yellow card) 85' (yellow-red card) 86'	Report	Zapata (yellow card) 20'; Muntari (yellow card) 36'; Torres 43'; De Sciglio (yellow card) 50'; Honda 57'	Stadium: Stadio Carlo Castellani; Attendance: 12,619; Referee: Gianpaolo Calvarese

28 September 2014 5	Chievo	1–1	Empoli	Verona
15:00 CEST (UTC+02:00)	Radovanović (yellow card) 45+1'; Meggiorini 50'; Hetemaj (yellow card) 86'; Biraghi (yellow card) 90+1'	Report	Pucciarelli 59'; Hysaj (yellow card) 74'	Stadium: Stadio Marc'Antonio Bentegodi; Attendance: 6,000; Referee: Davide Massa

5 October 2014 6	Empoli	3–0	Palermo	Empoli
12:30 CEST (UTC+02:00)	Maccarone 4'; Tonelli 33'; Pucciarelli 63'	Report	Vázquez (yellow card) 11'; Feddal (yellow card) 16'; Bolzoni (yellow card) 37'; Terzi (yellow card) 70'	Stadium: Stadio Carlo Castellani; Attendance: 7,504; Referee: Nicola Rizzoli

20 October 2015 7	Genoa	1–1	Empoli	Genoa
20:45 CEST (UTC+02:00)	Bertolacci 14', (yellow card) 90+2'; Antonini (yellow card) 71'; Perotti (yellow card) 78'	Report	Croce (yellow card) 76'; Tonelli 77'	Stadium: Stadio Luigi Ferraris; Attendance: 17,843; Referee: Angelo Cervellera

25 October 2014 8	Empoli	0–4	Cagliari	Empoli
15:00 CEST (UTC+02:00)	Valdifiori (yellow card) 37'; Moro (yellow card) 63'	Report	Sau 31'; Avelar 36', 38' (pen.); Ekdal 45+2'; Crisetig (yellow card) 51'; Farias (yellow card) 86'	Stadium: Stadio Carlo Castellani; Attendance: 8,121; Referee: Luca Pairetto

28 October 2014 9	Sassuolo	3–1	Empoli	Reggio Emilia
20:45 CET (UTC+01:00)	Taïder (yellow card) 44'; Missiroli 56'; Floccari 61'; Berardi 73'; Acerbi (yellow card) 89'	Report	Croce 18'; Vecino (yellow card) 19'; Maccarone (yellow card) 28'; Tonelli (yellow card) 75'	Stadium: Mapei Stadium – Città del Tricolore; Attendance: 15,000; Referee: Daniele Orsato

1 November 2014 10	Empoli	0–2	Juventus	Empoli
18:00 CET (UTC+01:00)	Tonelli (yellow card) 60' (red card) 90+5'; Hysaj (yellow card) 90+2'	Report	Vidal (yellow card) 53'; Pirlo 61'; Morata 72'	Stadium: Stadio Carlo Castellani; Attendance: 14,698; Referee: Paolo Valeri

9 November 2014 11	Empoli	2–1	Lazio	Empoli
15:00 CET (UTC+01:00)	Barba 52'; Maccarone 55'; Mário Rui (yellow card) 84'	Report	Cavanda (yellow card) 38'; Ederson (yellow card) 57'; Đorđević 66'	Stadium: Stadio Carlo Castellani; Attendance: 8,153; Referee: Paolo Mazzoleni

23 November 2014 12	Parma	0–2	Empoli	Parma
15:00 CET (UTC+01:00)	Lodi (yellow card) 47'; Galloppa (yellow card) 54'; Acquah (yellow card) 57'; Belfodil (yellow card) 70'	Report	Vecino 45+1'; Tavano 56'; Maccarone (yellow card) 70'	Stadium: Stadio Ennio Tardini; Attendance: 10,625; Referee: Piero Giacomelli

30 November 2014 13	Empoli	0–0	Atalanta	Empoli
15:00 CET (UTC+01:00)	Croce (yellow card) 5'; Tavano (yellow card) 73'	Report	Dramé (yellow card) 29'; Cigarini (yellow card) 83'; Migliaccio (yellow card) 90'	Stadium: Stadio Carlo Castellani; Attendance: 6,938; Referee: Sebastiano Peruzzo

7 December 2014 14	Napoli	2–2	Empoli	Naples
12:30 CET (UTC+01:00)	Maggio (yellow card) 63'; Zapata 67'; Albiol (yellow card) 69'; De Guzmán 72'	Report	Verdi 19'; Rugani 53'; Laxalt (yellow card) 63'; Mário Rui (yellow card) 73'	Stadium: Stadio San Paolo; Attendance: 30,128; Referee: Angelo Cervellera

15 December 2014 15	Empoli	0–0	Torino	Empoli
19:00 CET (UTC+01:00)	Vecino (yellow card) 4'; Mário Rui (yellow card) 69'	Report	Gazzi (yellow card) 17'; Jansson (yellow card) 32' (yellow-red card) 90+1'; Moretti (yellow card) 55'; El Kaddouri (yellow card) 79'	Stadium: Stadio Carlo Castellani; Attendance: 7,796; Referee: Gianpaolo Calvarese

21 December 2014 16	Fiorentina	1–1	Empoli	Florence
15:00 CET (UTC+01:00)	Vargas 44'; El Hamdaoui (yellow card) 88'; Valero (yellow card) 90'; Aquilani (yellow card) 90+1'	Report	Maccarone (yellow card) 32'; Tonelli 57'; Pucciarelli (yellow card) 89'; Zieliński (yellow card) 90+1'; Valdifiori (yellow card) 90+4'	Stadium: Stadio Artemio Franchi; Attendance: 34,162; Referee: Carmine Russo

6 January 2015 17	Empoli	0–0	Hellas Verona	Empoli
15:00 CET (UTC+01:00)	Tonelli (yellow card) 49' (yellow-red card) 65'	Report	Sala (yellow card) 24'; Toni (yellow card) 41'; Campanharo (yellow card) 59'; Hallfreðsson (yellow card) 68' (yellow-red card) 77'	Stadium: Stadio Carlo Castellani; Attendance: 7,705; Referee: Piero Giacomelli

11 January 2015 18	Sampdoria	1–0	Empoli	Genoa
15:00 CET (UTC+01:00)	Éder 49'; Palombo (yellow card) 59'	Report	Mário Rui (yellow card) 24'; Hysaj (yellow card) 36'	Stadium: Stadio Luigi Ferraris; Attendance: 19,931; Referee: Dino Tommasi

17 January 2015 19	Empoli	0–0	Internazionale	Empoli
18:00 CET (UTC+01:00)	Mchedlidze (yellow card) 57'	Report	Vidić (yellow card) 86'; Medel (yellow card) 90+3'	Stadium: Stadio Carlo Castellani; Attendance: 13,449; Referee: Daniele Doveri

26 January 2015 20	Empoli	1–2	Udinese	Empoli
19:00 CET (UTC+01:00)	Saponara 37' (pen.), (yellow card) 38'; Barba (yellow card) 90+4'	Report	Di Natale 19'; Danilo (yellow card) 36'; Widmer 60'; Kone (yellow card) 61' (yellow-red card) 74'; Piris (yellow card) 69'	Stadium: Stadio Carlo Castellani; Attendance: 7,381; Referee: Davide Ghersini

31 January 2015 21	Roma	1–1	Empoli	Rome
20:45 CET (UTC+01:00)	Manolas (red card) 38'; Maicon 57'; Florenzi (yellow card) 58'; Astori (yellow card) 90+1'; Nainggolan (yellow card) 90+4'	Report	Maccarone 39' (pen.); Saponara (yellow card) 43' (yellow-red card) 45+2'; Croce (yellow card) 50'; Valdifiori (yellow card) 71'	Stadium: Stadio Olimpico; Attendance: 33,621; Referee: Carmine Russo

8 February 2015 22	Empoli	2–0	Cesena	Empoli
15:00 CET (UTC+01:00)	Maccarone 29'; Mário Rui (yellow card) 45+1'; Signorelli 57'; Mchedlidze (yellow card) 83'	Report	De Feudis (yellow card) 11'; Capelli (yellow card) 36'; Giorgi (yellow card) 63'; Rodríguez (yellow card) 82'	Stadium: Stadio Carlo Castellani; Attendance: 7,586; Referee: Daniele Orsato

15 February 2015 23	Milan	1–1	Empoli	Milan
12:30 CET (UTC+01:00)	Destro 40'; Rami (yellow card) 48'; Antonelli (yellow card) 64'; Paletta (yellow card) 81'; Diego López (red card) 84'	Report	Maccarone 68'; Verdi (yellow card) 78'; Tonelli (yellow card) 90+1'	Stadium: San Siro; Attendance: 27,170; Referee: Paolo Valeri

22 February 2015 24	Empoli	3–0	Chievo	Empoli
15:00 CET (UTC+01:00)	Rugani 22'; Maccarone 46', 67'	Report	Radovanović (yellow card) 36'; Botta (yellow card) 87'	Stadium: Stadio Carlo Castellani; Attendance: 7,338; Referee: Paolo Tagliavento

1 March 2015 25	Palermo	0–0	Empoli	Palermo
15:00 CET (UTC+01:00)	Rispoli (yellow card) 37'; Dybala (yellow card) 51'; Daprelà (yellow card) 69'	Report	Hysaj (yellow card) 5'; Vecino (yellow card) 18'; Zieliński (yellow card) 89'	Stadium: Stadio Renzo Barbera; Attendance: 22,352; Referee: Angelo Cervellera

8 March 2015 26	Empoli	1–1	Genoa	Empoli
15:00 CET (UTC+01:00)	Barba 66'; Mário Rui (yellow card) 75'; Valdifiori (yellow card) 88'	Report	Niang 27'; Burdisso (yellow card) 61'; Bertolacci (yellow card) 69'	Stadium: Stadio Carlo Castellani; Attendance: 10,392; Referee: Fabio Maresca

14 March 2015 27	Cagliari	1–1	Empoli	Cagliari
20:45 CET (UTC+01:00)	Farias (yellow card) 8'; João Pedro 20'; Balzano (yellow card) 57'	Report	Zieliński (yellow card) 75'; Vecino 90+3'	Stadium: Stadio Sant'Elia; Attendance: 10,500; Referee: Nicola Rizzoli

22 March 2015 28	Empoli	3–1	Sassuolo	Empoli
12:30 CET (UTC+01:00)	Saponara 46', 60'; Mchedlidze 59'	Report	Acerbi (yellow card) 44'; Rugani 49' (o.g.); Magnanelli (yellow card) 62'	Stadium: Stadio Carlo Castellani; Attendance: 7,703; Referee: Dino Tommasi

4 April 2015 29	Juventus	2–0	Empoli	Turin
21:00 CEST (UTC+02:00)	Tevez 43', (yellow card) 48'; Barzagli (yellow card) 89'; Pereyra 90+4'	Report	Mário Rui (yellow card) 66'; Saponara (yellow card) 78'	Stadium: Juventus Stadium; Attendance: 40,029; Referee: Piero Giacomelli

12 April 2015 30	Lazio	4–0	Empoli	Rome
15:00 CEST (UTC+02:00)	Mauri 4'; Klose 31', (yellow card) 55'; Candreva 44'; Novaretti (yellow card) 46' (yellow-red card) 58'; Felipe Anderson 53'; Cana (yellow card) 75'; Cavanda (yellow card) 81'	Report		Stadium: Stadio Olimpico; Attendance: 49,096; Referee: Sebastiano Peruzzo

19 April 2015 31	Empoli	2–2	Parma	Empoli
15:00 CEST (UTC+02:00)	Maccarone 32'; Tonelli 45'	Report	Lodi 19'; Mauri (yellow card) 62'; Belfodil 73'	Stadium: Stadio Carlo Castellani; Attendance: 7,767; Referee: Fabrizio Pasqua

26 April 2015 32	Atalanta	2–2	Empoli	Bergamo
12:30 CEST (UTC+02:00)	Benalouane (yellow card) 33'; Gómez 43'; Cigarini (yellow card) 61'; D'Alessandro (yellow card) 85'; Denis 90+3'	Report	Saponara 41'; Pucciarelli (yellow card) 56'; Maccarone 60'	Stadium: Stadio Atleti Azzurri d'Italia; Attendance: 13,651; Referee: Angelo Cervellera

30 April 2015 33	Empoli	4–2	Napoli	Empoli
20:45 CEST (UTC+02:00)	Maccarone 8'; Laurini (yellow card) 15'; Britos 43' (o.g.); Saponara 45+1'; Tonelli (yellow card) 71'; Albiol 81' (o.g.); Verdi (yellow card) 90+1'	Report	Ghoulam (yellow card) 24'; Laurini 64' (o.g.); Higuaín (yellow card) 79'; Hamšík 90+1'	Stadium: Stadio Carlo Castellani; Attendance: 10,116; Referee: Davide Massa

6 May 2015 34	Torino	0–1	Empoli	Turin
15:00 CEST (UTC+02:00)	Glik (yellow card) 59'; González (yellow card) 66'; Peres (yellow card) 90+2'	Report	Padelli 3' (o.g.); Mário Rui (yellow card) 65'	Stadium: Stadio Olimpico di Torino; Attendance: 11,000; Referee: Dino Tommasi

10 May 2015 35	Empoli	2–3	Fiorentina	Empoli
18:00 CEST (UTC+02:00)	Saponara 27'; Mchedlidze 77', (yellow card) 83'	Report	Iličić 6', 68'; Badelj (yellow card) 24'; Vargas (yellow card) 33'; Salah 57'	Stadium: Stadio Carlo Castellani; Attendance: 9,878; Referee: Andrea Gervasoni

17 May 2015 36	Hellas Verona	2–1	Empoli	Verona
15:00 CEST (UTC+02:00)	Moras 24'; Fernandinho (yellow card) 66'; Sala 67'	Report	Saponara 6'; Croce (yellow card) 83'; Verdi (yellow card) 90'	Stadium: Stadio Marc'Antonio Bentegodi; Attendance: 18,588; Referee: Federico La Penna

24 May 2015 37	Empoli	1–1	Sampdoria	Empoli
12:30 CEST (UTC+02:00)	Valdifiori (yellow card) 41'; Pucciarelli 57'; Maccarone (yellow card) 90+5'; Vecino (yellow card) 90+6'	Report	Acquah (yellow card) 45+3'; Muriel (yellow card) 47'; Eto'o 90+1'; Romagnoli (yellow card) 90+5'	Stadium: Stadio Carlo Castellani; Attendance: 9,084; Referee: Gianpaolo Calvarese

31 May 2015 38	Internazionale	4–3	Empoli	Milan
20:45 CEST (UTC+02:00)	Palacio 49'; Icardi 53', 77'; Brozović 70'; Hernanes (yellow card) 84'	Report	Mchedlidze 59', 88'; Pucciarelli 62'; Barba (yellow card) 63'; Valdifiori (yellow card) 67'; Mário Rui (yellow card) 90+3'	Stadium: San Siro; Attendance: 32,036; Referee: Antonio Damato

=== Coppa Italia ===
24 August 2014 Third round	Empoli	3–0	L'Aquila	Empoli
20:45 CEST (UTC+02:00)	Verdi 10'; Tavano 19', 80'; Mchedlidze (yellow card) 53'		Del Pinto (yellow card) 33'; Karkalis (yellow card) 69'	Stadium: Stadio Carlo Castellani; Attendance: 2,359; Referee: Sig. Roca di Foggia

3 December 2014 Fourth round	Empoli	2–0	Genoa	Empoli
18:00 CET (UTC+01:00)	Laxalt 4'; Mchedlidze (yellow card) 68', (goal) 73'; Zieliński (yellow card) 89'	Report	Greco (yellow card) 8'; Matri (yellow card) 75'; Pinilla (yellow card) 85'	Stadium: Stadio Carlo Castellani; Attendance: 1,470; Referee: Marco Di Bello

20 January 2015 Round of 16	Roma	2–1 (a.e.t.)	Empoli	Rome
21:00 CET (UTC+01:00)	Iturbe 5'; Yanga-Mbiwa (yellow card) 99'; De Rossi 114' (pen.)	Report	Bianchetti (yellow card) 55'; Verdi 80'; Vecino (yellow card) 113'; Zieliński (yellow card) 113'; Laxalt (yellow card) 120+1'	Stadium: Stadio Olimpico; Attendance: 11,019; Referee: Marco Di Bello

== Statistics ==
=== Appearances and goals ===
No.	Pos	Nat	Player	Total		Serie A		Coppa Italia	
No.	Pos	Nat	Player	Apps	Goals	Apps	Goals	Apps	Goals
Goalkeepers
1	GK	(Italy) ITA	Maurizio Pugliesi	0	0	0	0	0	0
28	GK	(Italy) ITA	Davide Bassi	9	0	7	0	2	0
32	GK	(Italy) ITA	Alessandro Giacomel	0	0	0	0	0	0
33	GK	(Italy) ITA	Luigi Sepe	32	0	31	0	1	0
Defenders
2	DF	(France) FRA	Vincent Laurini	17	0	14+1	0	2	0
19	DF	(Italy) ITA	Federico Barba	20	2	12+6	2	2	0
21	DF	(Portugal) POR	Mário Rui	37	0	28+6	0	2+1	0
22	DF	(Italy) ITA	Matteo Bianchetti	3	0	0+1	0	2	0
23	DF	(Albania) ALB	Elseid Hysaj	39	0	33+3	0	2+1	0
24	DF	(Italy) ITA	Daniele Rugani	39	3	38	3	1	0
26	DF	(Italy) ITA	Lorenzo Tonelli	30	5	27+1	5	1+1	0
50	DF	(Italy) ITA	Michele Somma	1	0	0+1	0	0	0
Midfielders
5	MF	(Italy) ITA	Riccardo Saponara	18	7	17	7	1	0
6	MF	(Italy) ITA	Mirko Valdifiori	38	0	36	0	1+1	0
8	MF	(Venezuela) VEN	Franco Signorelli	15	1	4+9	1	2	0
11	MF	(Italy) ITA	Daniele Croce	39	1	35+2	1	2	0
17	MF	(Italy) ITA	Tiberio Guarente	1	0	0+1	0	0	0
18	MF	(Italy) ITA	Simone Verdi	28	3	17+9	1	1+1	2
25	MF	(Australia) AUS	Joshua Brillante	1	0	0+1	0	0	0
27	MF	(Poland) POL	Piotr Zieliński	30	0	7+21	0	1+1	0
88	MF	(Uruguay) URU	Matías Vecino	38	2	36	2	2	0
Forwards
7	FW	(Italy) ITA	Massimo Maccarone	35	10	30+4	10	1	0
9	FW	(Georgia (country)) GEO	Levan Mchedlidze	27	5	6+19	4	2	1
10	FW	(Italy) ITA	Francesco Tavano	28	4	15+11	2	2	2
20	FW	(Italy) ITA	Manuel Pucciarelli	36	5	25+9	5	1+1	0
Players transferred out during the season
5	MF	(Italy) ITA	Davide Moro	4	0	0+4	0	0	0
13	MF	(Uruguay) URU	Diego Laxalt	7	1	0+4	0	2+1	1
77	FW	(Georgia (country)) GEO	Irakli Shekiladze	0	0	0	0	0	0
95	FW	(Italy) ITA	Emanuele Rovini	0	0	0	0	0	0
99	FW	(Uruguay) URU	Rodrigo Aguirre	2	0	0+1	0	0+1	0

Last updated: 30 May 2015
Source: Competitions

=== Goalscorers ===
Rank	No.	Pos	Nat	Name	Serie A	Coppa Italia	Total
1	7	FW	(Italy)	Massimo Maccarone	10	0	10
2	5	MF	(Italy)	Riccardo Saponara	7	0	7
3	9	FW	(Georgia (country))	Levan Mchedlidze	4	1	5
3	20	FW	(Italy)	Manuel Pucciarelli	5	0	5
3	26	DF	(Italy)	Lorenzo Tonelli	5	0	5
6	10	FW	(Italy)	Francesco Tavano	2	2	4
7	18	MF	(Italy)	Simone Verdi	1	2	3
7	24	DF	(Italy)	Daniele Rugani	3	0	3
9	19	DF	(Italy)	Federico Barba	2	0	2
9	88	MF	(Uruguay)	Matías Vecino	2	0	2
11	8	MF	(Venezuela)	Franco Signorelli	1	0	1
11	11	MF	(Italy)	Daniele Croce	1	0	1
11	13	MF	(Uruguay)	Diego Laxalt	0	1	1
Own goal					3	0	3
Totals					46	6	52

Last updated: 17 January 2016
