= Roberto Soriano =

Italian footballer

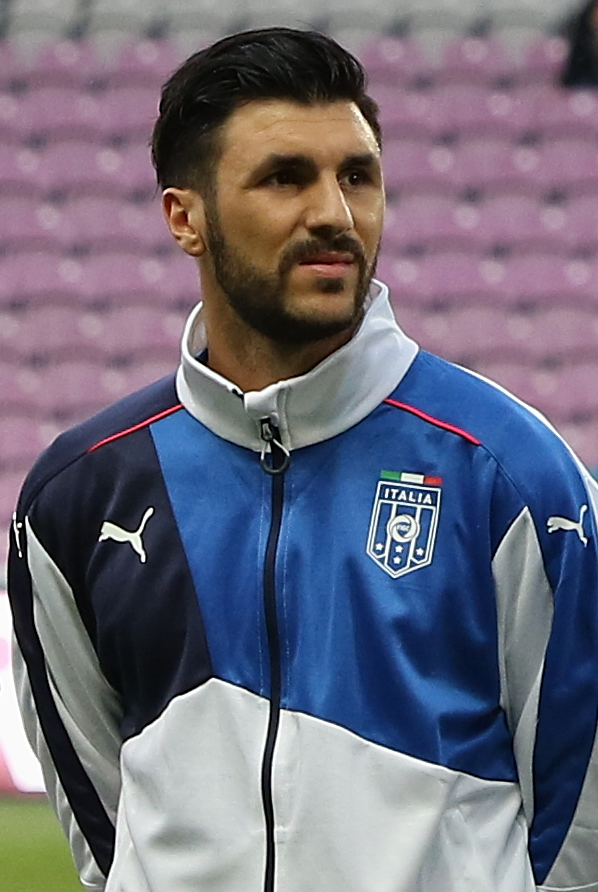
- Soriano with Italy in 2015

Personal information
- Date of birth: 8 February 1991 (age 35)
- Place of birth: Darmstadt, Germany
- Height: 1.82 m (6 ft 0 in)
- Position: Midfielder

Youth career
- 2006–2009: Bayern Munich
- 2009–2010: Sampdoria

Senior career*
Years	Team	Apps	(Gls)
2010–2016	Sampdoria	136	(18)
2010–2011	→ Empoli (loan)	27	(2)
2016–2019	Villarreal	55	(9)
2018–2019	→ Torino (loan)	11	(0)
2019	→ Bologna (loan)	17	(2)
2019–2023	Bologna	128	(15)
2024–2025	Salernitana	31	(4)

International career^{‡}
2007–2008	Italy U17	7	(1)
2009	Italy U18	4	(0)
2008–2010	Italy U19	11	(0)
2009–2011	Italy U21	15	(2)
2014–2020	Italy	9	(0)
- * Club domestic league appearances and goals as of 17 May 2025 ‡ National team caps and goals as of 11 November 2020

Roberto Soriano (Italian pronunciation: [roˈbɛrto soˈrjaːno]; born 8 February 1991) is a professional footballer who plays as a midfielder. Born in Germany, he played for the Italy national team from 2014 to 2020.

== Club career ==
=== Early career ===
Soriano was born in the German city of Darmstadt to a family from Sperone, Province of Avellino, Italy. He started his career with Bayern Munich after being spotted by their scouts in the 2007 Champions Youth Cup while playing for Die Roten.

=== Sampdoria ===
On 2 February 2009, Soriano moved to Italian club Sampdoria for an undisclosed fee. Soriano immediately entered Sampdoria's Primavera, or youth team, for the 2009 Torneo di Viareggio, where the Genoa based club finished as runners-up. In the 2009–10 season, Sampdoria were eliminated in the semi-finals at the Campionato Nazionale Primavera, in which Soriano played.

=== Empoli ===
In June 2010, he was loaned to Serie B side Empoli. Soriano made his club debut on 15 August 2010 in a friendly against Reggiana. Soriano was substituted by Gianluca Musacci during the second half. Empoli went on to win that match 4–1. He made his Serie B debut in Empoli's first Serie B match of the season as a defensive/holding midfielder along with Davide Moro. He was substituted for Mirko Valdifiori in the 66th minute. Empoli drew that game 1–1 against Frosinone. However, Empoli would win the away match 3–2. Soriano started from the bench in the next match, losing his starting spot to Gianluca Musacci. He returned to the starting XI in Empoli's 5th Serie B game of the season, and played as a central/defensive midfielder, a position he would be utilized in during the next 2 rounds (4–4–2 formation and 4–3–1–2 formation). On 11 December, he scored his first Serie B goal in the game against Portogruaro.

On 31 August 2015, Soriano signed a contract with Napoli worth €13.5m with Juan Camilo Zúñiga set to join Sampdoria as part of the deal, but the transfer fell through because Napoli did not deposit the contract with Lega Serie A before the 23:00 deadline. It is believed the delay was mainly due to disputes about image rights.

=== Villarreal ===
On 2 August 2016, Spanish club Villarreal CF and Sampdoria reached an agreement for the transfer of Soriano. He signed a five-year contract, for a reported fee of €14 million. Soriano made his club debut in a 1–1 away draw against Granada in La Liga, on 20 August.

==== Torino (loan) ====
On 17 August 2018, he joined Torino on loan with an option to buy.

==== Bologna (loan) ====
On 4 January 2019, he joined Bologna on loan with an option to buy.

=== Salernitana ===
After not playing in the 2023–24 season because of an injury, on 20 August 2024 Soriano signed a one-season contract with Salernitana.

== International career ==
=== Youth team ===
Soriano played all three matches in the 2008 UEFA European Under-17 Football Championship elite round. He also received a call-up to the 2008 Minsk under-17 International Tournament. He scored a goal in the third place match. Soriano was to receive a call-up from the Italian under-19 side for the game against Romania in December 2008. He was included in Italy's starting line-up for this match. The game finished 3–1 to Italy. Soriano received a call-up to all upcoming U18/19 matches, played in the friendly against Norway in March, was an unused substitute against Ukraine (born 1990 class) in April and also appeared in an U18 international tournament in Slovakia. In August 2009, he was promoted to the U21 team aged 18 1/2, for the match against Wales. Coach Pierluigi Casiraghi called-up six new players in for that match, only Mattia Perin (born in November 1992) and Lorenzo Crisetig (born in January 1993) were younger than Soriano. He made his debut in the first match of U21 qualification, a 2–1 loss to Wales on 4 September 2009. Soriano was also involved in two of Italy's qualification matches in September and October. On 17 November, he opened the scoring for Italy in a 4–0 victory away against Luxembourg. In January 2010, Soriano returned to the U19 team and played in the elite qualification round and in the final of the tournament. On 3 September 2010, he returned to the U21 team and scored the winning goal for Azzurrini in the second last qualifying match. Italy must win the last two matches and depends the result of Wales versus Hungary (which Hungary lost eventually, certainly finished second or below). Soriano played the last match of the qualifying, substituted Marrone in the 56th minute. Italy beat Wales 1–0 and finished ahead Wales as the first of Group 3, qualifying directly to play-offs round while Wales were eliminated.

In the play-offs round, he received the call-up but failed to enter the line-up nor on the bench in the first leg.

=== Senior team ===
On 9 November 2014, he was called up by Antonio Conte to the senior Italy squad ahead of a UEFA Euro 2016 qualifying match against Croatia and a friendly against Albania. He debuted against Croatia at the San Siro on the 16th, replacing Manuel Pasqual in the 28th minute of a 1–1 draw.

== Career statistics ==
=== Club ===
As of match played 8 March 2025

Appearances and goals by club, season and competition
Club	Season	League			Cup		Europe		Other		Total	
Club	Season	Division	Apps	Goals	Apps	Goals	Apps	Goals	Apps	Goals	Apps	Goals
Empoli (loan)	2010–11	Serie B	27	2	2	0	—		—		29	2
Sampdoria	2011–12	Serie B	13	1	0	0	—		3 (Note: Appearances in Serie B promotion play-offs)	0	16	1
Sampdoria	2012–13	Serie A	24	0	1	0	—		—		25	0
Sampdoria	2013–14	Serie A	29	5	0	0	—		—		29	5
Sampdoria	2014–15	Serie A	33	4	2	0	—		—		35	4
Sampdoria	2015–16	Serie A	37	8	1	0	2 (Note: Appearances in UEFA Europa League)	0	—		40	8
Sampdoria	Total		136	18	4	0	2	0	3	0	145	18
Villarreal	2016–17	La Liga	33	9	3	1	7 (Note: Two appearances in UEFA Champions League, five appearances in UEFA Europa League)	0	—		43	10
Villarreal	2017–18	La Liga	22	0	2	0	6	0	—		30	0
Villarreal	Total		55	9	5	1	13	0	—		73	10
Torino (loan)	2018–19	Serie A	11	0	1	1	—		—		12	1
Bologna (loan)	2018–19	Serie A	17	2	1	0	—		—		18	2
Bologna	2019–20	Serie A	29	5	1	0	—		—		30	5
Bologna	2020–21	Serie A	37	9	2	0	—		—		39	9
Bologna	2021–22	Serie A	35	0	1	1	—		—		36	1
Bologna	2022–23	Serie A	27	1	3	0	—		—		30	1
Bologna	Total		145	17	8	1	—		—		153	18
Salernitana	2024–25	Serie B	22	4	1	0	—		—		23	4
Career total			396	50	21	3	15	0	3	0	435	53

=== International ===
As of match played 11 November 2020

Appearances and goals by national team and year
National team	Year	Apps	Goals
Italy	2014	1	0
Italy	2015	7	0
Italy	2020	1	0
Total		9	0
