= 2015–16 UC Sampdoria season =

Sampdoria
2015–16 season
- President: Massimo Ferrero
- Manager: Walter Zenga (until 10 November 2015); Vincenzo Montella (from 15 November 2015)
- Stadium: Stadio Luigi Ferraris
- Serie A: 15th
- Coppa Italia: Round of 16
- UEFA Europa League: Third qualifying round
- Top goalscorer: League: Éder (12); All: Éder (13)
- Highest home attendance: 31,375 vs Genoa (8 May 2016, Serie A)
- Lowest home attendance: 11,200 vs Milan (17 December 2015, Coppa Italia)
- Average home league attendance: 21,974
Home colours	Away colours	Third colours

The 2015–16 season was Unione Calcio Sampdoria's fourth season back in Serie A after having been relegated at the end of the 2011–12 season. The team competed in Serie A, finishing a disappointing 15th; in the Coppa Italia, where they were eliminated in the Round of 16; and in the UEFA Europa League, where the club was eliminated in the third qualifying round following a shocking 4–0 home defeat to Serbian club Vojvodina, losing the tie 4–2 on aggregate.

== Players ==
=== Squad information ===
As of 1 February 2016

Note: Flags indicate national team as defined under FIFA eligibility rules; some limited exceptions apply. Players may hold more than one non-FIFA nationality.

No.	Pos.	Nation	Player
1	GK	ITA	Christian Puggioni
2	GK	ITA	Emiliano Viviano
3	DF	ALG	Djamel Mesbah
4	DF	FIN	Niklas Moisander
5	DF	ITA	Mattia Cassani
7	MF	BRA	Fernando
8	MF	PAR	Édgar Barreto
9	FW	ESP	Alejandro Rodríguez
10	MF	ARG	Joaquín Correa
11	DF	BRA	Dodô (on loan from Internazionale)
13	DF	POR	Pedro Pereira
16	DF	ITA	Andrea Ranocchia (on loan from Internazionale)
17	MF	ITA	Angelo Palombo (captain)
20	MF	SRB	Nenad Krstičić

No.	Pos.	Nation	Player
21	MF	ITA	Roberto Soriano
23	DF	FRA	Modibo Diakité
24	FW	COL	Luis Muriel
25	MF	ARG	Ricky Álvarez
26	DF	ARG	Matías Silvestre
27	DF	ITA	Fabio Quagliarella (on loan from Torino)
29	DF	ITA	Lorenzo De Silvestri
32	MF	ITA	Marco Marchionni
57	GK	ITA	Alberto Brignoli (on loan from Juventus)
77	MF	COL	Carlos Carbonero
80	FW	ITA	Edoardo Oneto
95	MF	SVK	Dávid Ivan
96	GK	ITA	Samuele Massolo
99	FW	ITA	Antonio Cassano

== Transfers ==
=== In ===
No.	Pos.	Nat.	Name	Age	EU	Moving from	Type	Transfer window	Ends	Transfer fee	Source
25	MF	(Argentina)	Ricky Álvarez	27	Non-EU	Free agent	Transfer	Winter	2016	Free	
16	MF	(Italy)	Andrea Ranocchia	27	EU	(Italy) Internazionale	Loan	Winter			
27	FW	(Italy)	Fabio Quagliarella	33	EU	(Italy) Torino	Loan	Winter			
	DF	(France)	Modibo Diakité	28	EU	(Italy) Frosinone	Transfer	Winter			

Total spending: ▼€0.00 million

=== Out ===
No.	Pos.	Nat.	Name	Age	EU	Moving to	Type	Transfer window	Transfer fee	Source
9	FW	(Italy)	Stefano Okaka	25	EU	(Belgium) Anderlecht		Summer	$3 million	
	ST	(Italy)	Éder	28	EU	(Italy) Internazionale	Loan	Winter		

Total income: ▲€3.00 Million

Total expenditure: ▼€0.00 Million

== Pre-season and friendlies ==
10 July 2015 Friendly	Virtus (San Marino)	0–5	(Italy) Sampdoria
			Wszołek 15'; Oneto 20', 24'; Ivan 42'; Krstičić 84'

== Competitions ==
=== Serie A ===
==== League table ====
Pos	Team	Pld	W	D	L	GF	GA	GD	Pts
13	Atalanta	38	11	12	15	41	47	−6	45 (Note: Torino ahead of Atalanta on head-to-head points; Torino 6 points, Atalanta 0 points.)
14	Bologna	38	11	9	18	33	45	−12	42
15	Sampdoria	38	10	10	18	48	61	−13	40
16	Palermo	38	10	9	19	38	65	−27	39 (Note: Palermo ahead of Udinese on head-to-head points; Palermo 6 points, Udinese 0 points.)
17	Udinese	38	10	9	19	35	60	−25	39

Source: Serie A, Soccerway
Rules for classification: 1) Points; 2) Head-to-head points; 3) Head-to-head goal difference; 4) Goal difference; 5) Goals scored; 6) Draw.

==== Results summary ====
Overall								Home						Away					
Pld	W	D	L	GF	GA	GD	Pts	W	D	L	GF	GA	GD	W	D	L	GF	GA	GD
38	10	10	18	48	61	−13	40	8	4	6	29	24	+5	2	6	12	19	37	−18

Last updated: 14 May 2016.
Source: Competitive matches

==== Results by round ====
Round	1	2	3	4	5	6	7	8	9	10	11	12	13	14	15	16	17	18	19	20	21	22	23	24	25	26	27	28	29	30	31	32	33	34	35	36	37	38
Ground	H	A	H	A	H	A	H	A	H	H	A	H	A	A	H	A	H	A	H	A	H	A	H	A	H	A	H	A	A	H	A	H	H	A	H	A	H	A
Result	W	D	W	L	W	L	D	L	W	D	D	L	L	L	L	D	W	W	L	L	L	L	D	L	D	L	W	W	D	L	D	W	L	D	W	L	L	L
Position	1	6	3	7	5	9	9	10	7	9	9	10	12	14	14	16	14	13	13	14	17	17	17	17	17	17	16	13	13	15	16	15	15	15	14	15	15	15

Updated to match(es) played on 15 May 2016. Source: Competitive matches
A = Away; H = Home; W = Win; D = Draw; L = Loss

==== Matches ====
23 August 2015 1	Sampdoria	5–2	Carpi	Genoa
20:45 CEST (UTC+02:00)	Éder 14' (pen.), 33'; Muriel 21', 31'; Fernando 37'; Coda (yellow card) 71'; Ivan (yellow card) 76' (yellow-red card) 81'	Report	Letizia (yellow card) 13'; Porcari (yellow card) 35'; Lazzari 38'; Marrone (yellow card) 66'; Matos 88'	Stadium: Stadio Luigi Ferraris; Attendance: 21,835; Referee: Michael Fabbri

30 August 2015 2	Napoli	2–2	Sampdoria	Naples
20:45 CEST (UTC+02:00)	Higuaín 9', 39'	Report	Silvestre (yellow card) 33'; Éder 58' (pen.), 59'; Fernando (yellow card) 76'	Stadium: Stadio San Paolo; Attendance: 25,128; Referee: Andrea Gervasoni

14 September 2015 3	Sampdoria	2–0	Bologna	Genoa
20:45 CEST (UTC+02:00)	Regini (yellow card) 8'; Éder 75'; Soriano 79'	Report	Taïder (yellow card) 11'; Maietta (yellow card) 45+3'; Rizzo (yellow card) 51' (yellow-red card) 62'; Rossettini (yellow card) 65'	Stadium: Stadio Luigi Ferraris; Attendance: 20,976; Referee: Angelo Cervellera
Note: Postponed from 13 September due to excessive rain.

20 September 2015 4	Torino	2–0	Sampdoria	Turin
15:00 CEST (UTC+02:00)	Quagliarella 18', 24'; Acquah (yellow card) 45+1'; Vives (yellow card) 63'	Report	Regini (yellow card) 39'; Fernando (yellow card) 79'; Christodoulopoulos (yellow card) 84'	Stadium: Stadio Olimpico di Torino; Attendance: 18,686; Referee: Piero Giacomelli

23 September 2015 5	Sampdoria	2–1	Roma	Genoa
20:45 CEST (UTC+02:00)	Éder (yellow card) 26', (goal) 50'; Fernando (yellow card) 54'; Correa (yellow card) 56'; Barreto (yellow card) 73'; Manolas 85' (o.g.); Mesbah (yellow card) 90+1'; Zukanović (yellow card) 90+4'	Report	De Rossi (yellow card) 30'; Pjanić (yellow card) 45+3'; Digne (yellow card) 52'; Salah 69'	Stadium: Stadio Luigi Ferraris; Attendance: 21,769; Referee: Luca Banti

28 September 2015 6	Atalanta	2–1	Sampdoria	Bergamo
21:00 CEST (UTC+02:00)	Moisander 7' (o.g.); Paletta (yellow card) 57'; De Roon (yellow card) 66'; Migliaccio (yellow card) 88'; Denis 90+1'	Report	Fernando (yellow card) 27'; Mesbah (yellow card) 59'; Zukanović (yellow card) 82'; Soriano 90+4'	Stadium: Stadio Atleti Azzurri d'Italia; Attendance: 15,756; Referee: Paolo Valeri

4 October 2015 7	Sampdoria	1–1	Internazionale	Genoa
15:00 CEST (UTC+02:00)	Muriel 51'; Barreto (yellow card) 64'; Fernando (yellow card) 81'	Report	Perišić (yellow card) 68', (goal) 76'; Melo (yellow card) 80'; Medel (yellow card) 82'; Guarín (yellow card) 90+4'	Stadium: Stadio Luigi Ferraris; Attendance: 24,329; Referee: Gianluca Rocchi

18 October 2015 8	Frosinone	2–0	Sampdoria	Frosinone
15:00 CEST (UTC+02:00)	Blanchard (yellow card) 20'; Paganini 54'; Dionisi 55' (yellow card) 77'	Report	Zukanović (yellow card) 16'; Ivan (yellow card) 41'; Moisander (yellow card) 78'; Carbonero (yellow card) 88'	Stadium: Stadio Matusa; Attendance: 7,252; Referee: Massimiliano Irrati

25 October 2015 9	Sampdoria	4–1	Hellas Verona	Genoa
12:30 CET (UTC+01:00)	Muriel 11'; Zukanović 28'; Soriano 45+1'; Éder 54'; Cassani (yellow card) 59'; Fernando (yellow card) 70'	Report	Juanito (yellow card) 38'; Ioniță 75'; Sala (yellow card) 87'	Stadium: Stadio Luigi Ferraris; Attendance: 21,082; Referee: Maurizio Mariani

29 October 2015 10	Sampdoria	1–1	Empoli	Genoa
20:45 CET (UTC+01:00)	Soriano (yellow card) 41'; Muriel (yellow card) 65'; Éder 67'	Report	Costa (yellow card) 21'; Dioussé (yellow card) 52' (yellow-red card) 88'; Pucciarelli 60'; Büchel (yellow card) 71'; Skorupski (yellow card) 90+1'	Stadium: Stadio Luigi Ferraris; Attendance: 20,315; Referee: Angelo Cervellera

2 November 2015 11	Chievo	1–1	Sampdoria	Verona
19:00 CET (UTC+01:00)	Inglese 34'; Dainelli (yellow card) 41'; Hetemaj (yellow card) 59'; Meggiorini (yellow card) 69'	Report	Éder 8'; Silvestre (yellow card) 38'; Cassani (yellow card) 73'	Stadium: Stadio Marc'Antonio Bentegodi; Attendance: 9,200; Referee: Claudio Gavillucci

8 November 2015 12	Sampdoria	0–2	Fiorentina	Genoa
20:45 CET (UTC+01:00)	Zukanović (yellow card) 9'; Soriano (yellow card) 20'; Éder (yellow card) 83'	Report	Badelj (yellow card) 3'; Vecino (yellow card) 6'; Iličić 10' (pen.); Gonzalo (yellow card) 12'; Kalinić 58'	Stadium: Stadio Luigi Ferraris; Attendance: 22,457; Referee: Carmine Russo

22 November 2015 13	Udinese	1–0	Sampdoria	Udine
12:30 CET (UTC+01:00)	Iturra (yellow card) 16'; Badu 34'; Danilo (yellow card) 51'; Felipe (yellow card) 71'	Report	Silvestre (yellow card) 84'; Zukanović (red card) 90'	Stadium: Stadio Friuli; Attendance: 15,713; Referee: Marco Di Bello

28 November 2015 14	Milan	4–1	Sampdoria	Milan
20:45 CET (UTC+01:00)	Bonaventura 16'; Niang 38' (pen.), 49'; Kucka (yellow card) 39'; Luiz Adriano 79'	Report	De Silvestri (yellow card) 37'; Soriano (yellow card) 45+1'; Éder 87' (pen.)	Stadium: San Siro; Attendance: 32,368; Referee: Daniele Doveri

6 December 2015 15	Sampdoria	1–3	Sassuolo	Genoa
18:00 CET (UTC+01:00)	Silvestre (yellow card) 84'; Zukanović 90'; Cassani (yellow card) 90+3'	Report	Acerbi 8', (yellow card) 17'; Floccari 27'; Vrsaljko (yellow card) 29'; Pellegrini 39', (yellow card) 43'	Stadium: Stadio Luigi Ferraris; Attendance: 20,581; Referee: Maurizio Mariani

14 December 2015 16	Lazio	1–1	Sampdoria	Rome
20:45 CET (UTC+01:00)	Gentiletti (yellow card) 30'; Matri 78'; Berisha (yellow card) 90+2'	Report	Zukanović (yellow card) 24', (goal) 90+3'; Soriano (yellow card) 61'; Cassano (yellow card) 68'; Carbonero (yellow card) 76'	Stadium: Stadio Olimpico; Attendance: 16,544; Referee: Gianpaolo Calvarese

20 December 2015 17	Sampdoria	2–0	Palermo	Genoa
18:00 CET (UTC+01:00)	Soriano 53'; Fernando (yellow card) 63'; Ivan (yellow card) 65', (goal) 76'	Report	Vázquez (yellow card) 43'; Struna (yellow card) 57'; González (yellow card) 90'; Đurđević (yellow card) 90+4'	Stadium: Stadio Luigi Ferraris; Attendance: 20,309; Referee: Michael Fabbri

5 January 2016 18	Genoa	2–3	Sampdoria	Genoa
20:45 CET (UTC+01:00)	Izzo (yellow card) 48'; Rigoni (yellow card) 63'; Pavoletti 69', 81', (yellow card) 83'; Ansaldi (yellow card) 71'; Rincón (yellow card) 78'; Burdisso (yellow card) 90+3'	Report	Soriano 18', 49'; Éder 39'; Fernando (yellow card) 72'	Stadium: Stadio Luigi Ferraris; Attendance: 31,770; Referee: Paolo Valeri

10 January 2016 19	Sampdoria	1–2	Juventus	Genoa
20:45 CET (UTC+01:00)	Cassano 64'; Cassani (yellow card) 67'; Carbonero (yellow card) 90+2'; Moisander (red card) 90+4'	Report	Pogba 17', (yellow card) 47'; Bonucci (yellow card) 39'; Khedira 46', (yellow card) 90'; Hernanes (yellow card) 88'	Stadium: Stadio Luigi Ferraris; Attendance: 25,024; Referee: Paolo Mazzoleni

17 January 2016 20	Carpi	2–1	Sampdoria	Modena
15:00 CET (UTC+01:00)	Lollo 27'; Gagliolo (yellow card) 45' (yellow-red card) 86'; Cofie (yellow card) 48'; Mbakogu 55' (pen.)	Report	Correa 33'; Soriano (yellow card) 73'	Stadium: Stadio Alberto Braglia; Attendance: 9,669; Referee: Maurizio Mariani

24 January 2016 21	Sampdoria	2–4	Napoli	Genoa
15:00 CET (UTC+01:00)	Cassani (yellow card) 27' (yellow-red card) 59'; Correa 45'; Fernando (yellow card) 45+2'; Éder 73'	Report	Higuaín 9'; Jorginho (yellow card) 13'; Insigne 18' (pen.); Hamšík 60'; Mertens 79'	Stadium: Stadio Luigi Ferraris; Attendance: 22,635; Referee: Daniele Orsato

31 January 2016 22	Bologna	3–2	Sampdoria	Bologna
15:00 CET (UTC+01:00)	Mounier 12', (yellow card) 63'; Donsah 24'; Gastaldello (yellow card) 68'; Destro 88' (pen.); Oikonomou (yellow card) 90+2'	Report	Fernando (yellow card) 32'; Muriel 54'; Ivan (yellow card) 61'; Silvestre (yellow card) 65'; Correa 80', (yellow card) 86'; Álvarez (yellow card) 87'	Stadium: Stadio Renato Dall'Ara; Attendance: 18,043; Referee: Michael Fabbri

3 February 2016 23	Sampdoria	2–2	Torino	Genoa
20:45 CET (UTC+01:00)	Correa (yellow card) 45+1'; Diakité (yellow card) 45+2'; Muriel 66'; Ranocchia (yellow card) 77'; Soriano 84'	Report	Gazzi (yellow card) 31'; Glik (yellow card) 48'; Belotti 71', 90+4'; Baselli (yellow card) 90+1'	Stadium: Stadio Luigi Ferraris; Attendance: 20,223; Referee: Marco Guida

7 February 2016 24	Roma	2–1	Sampdoria	Rome
20:45 CET (UTC+01:00)	Zukanović (yellow card) 34'; Florenzi 45'; Perotti 50'; Keita (yellow card) 62'	Report	Barreto (yellow card) 11'; Correa (yellow card) 38'; Ranocchia (yellow card) 55'; Pjanić 57' (o.g.)	Stadium: Stadio Olimpico; Attendance: 28,301; Referee: Domenico Celi

14 February 2016 25	Sampdoria	0–0	Atalanta	Genoa
15:00 CET (UTC+01:00)	Ivan (yellow card) 30'; Silvestre (yellow card) 41'	Report	De Roon (yellow card) 26'; Diamanti (yellow card) 76'; Gómez (yellow card) 78'; Borriello (yellow card) 85'	Stadium: Stadio Luigi Ferraris; Attendance: 20,341; Referee: Antonio Damato

20 February 2016 26	Internazionale	3–1	Sampdoria	Milan
20:45 CET (UTC+01:00)	D'Ambrosio 23'; Brozović (yellow card) 42'; Miranda (yellow card) 50', (goal) 57'; Nagatomo (yellow card) 72'; Icardi 73'	Report	Ranocchia (yellow card) 18'; Dodô (yellow card) 33'; Quagliarella 90+2'	Stadium: San Siro; Attendance: 39,055; Referee: Davide Massa

28 February 2016 27	Sampdoria	2–0	Frosinone	Genoa
15:00 CET (UTC+01:00)	Fernando 44'; Correa (yellow card) 53'; Quagliarella 69', (yellow card) 70'; Silvestre (yellow card) 78'; Krstičić (yellow card) 80'; Moisander (yellow card) 90'	Report	Frara (yellow card) 58'; Sammarco (yellow card) 86'	Stadium: Stadio Luigi Ferraris; Attendance: 20,622; Referee: Daniele Orsato

5 March 2016 28	Hellas Verona	0–3	Sampdoria	Verona
18:00 CET (UTC+01:00)	Gilberto (yellow card) 44'; Marrone (yellow card) 57'	Report	Christodoulopoulos (yellow card) 3', (goal) 30'; Soriano 6'; Cassano 11'; Fernando (yellow card) 62'; Ranocchia (yellow card) 74'	Stadium: Stadio Marc'Antonio Bentegodi; Attendance: 18,900; Referee: Angelo Cervellera

12 March 2016 29	Empoli	1–1	Sampdoria	Empoli
18:00 CET (UTC+01:00)	Mário Rui (yellow card) 56'; Costa (yellow card) 69'; Laurini 82'	Report	De Silvestri (yellow card) 31'; Quagliarella 42'; Álvarez (yellow card) 78'; Christodoulopoulos (yellow card) 81'	Stadium: Stadio Carlo Castellani; Attendance: 8,752; Referee: Michael Fabbri

20 March 2016 30	Sampdoria	0–1	Chievo	Genoa
15:00 CET (UTC+01:00)	Soriano (yellow card) 31'; Fernando (yellow card) 60'; De Silvestri (yellow card) 63'; Moisander (yellow card) 71'	Report	Meggiorini 24'; Castro (yellow card) 39'; Hetemaj (yellow card) 61'; Bizzarri (yellow card) 89'	Stadium: Stadio Luigi Ferraris; Attendance: 20,754; Referee: Luca Pairetto

3 April 2016 31	Fiorentina	1–1	Sampdoria	Florence
15:00 CEST (UTC+02:00)	Iličić 24'; Gonzalo (yellow card) 49'	Report	Álvarez 39'; Cassani (yellow card) 42'; Krstičić (yellow card) 53'; Correa (yellow card) 58' (yellow-red card) 72'	Stadium: Stadio Artemio Franchi; Attendance: 28,803; Referee: Andrea Gervasoni

10 April 2016 32	Sampdoria	2–0	Udinese	Genoa
15:00 CEST (UTC+02:00)	Moisander (yellow card) 43'; Muriel (yellow card) 46'; Armero 58' (o.g.); Diakité (yellow card) 67'; Ranocchia (yellow card) 73'; Fernando 85'	Report	Kuzmanović (yellow card) 39'	Stadium: Stadio Luigi Ferraris; Attendance: 20,615; Referee: Carmine Russo

17 April 2016 33	Sampdoria	0−1	Milan	Genoa
20:45 CEST (UTC+02:00)	Krstičić (yellow card) 29'; Fernando (yellow card) 72'; De Silvestri (yellow card) 74'	Report	Bacca 71'; Poli (yellow card) 74'; Kucka (yellow card) 82'	Stadium: Stadio Luigi Ferraris; Attendance: 21,615; Referee: Paolo Valeri

20 April 2016 34	Sassuolo	0–0	Sampdoria	Reggio Emilia
18:30 CEST (UTC+02:00)	Cannavaro (yellow card) 36'; Sansone (yellow card) 44'; Pellegrini (yellow card) 63'; Berardi (yellow card) 81'	Report	Diakité (yellow card) 18'; Dodô (yellow card) 19'; Ranocchia (yellow card) 22' (yellow-red card) 27'; Krstičić (yellow card) 88'	Stadium: Mapei Stadium – Città del Tricolore; Attendance: 9,392; Referee: Maurizio Mariani

24 April 2016 35	Sampdoria	2–1	Lazio	Genoa
15:00 CEST (UTC+02:00)	Fernando 20'; Dodô (yellow card) 44'; De Silvestri 78'; Škriniar (yellow card) 90+4'	Report	Đorđević 3'; Hoedt (yellow card) 22'; Candreva (yellow card) 32'; Keita (yellow card) 38'; Konko (yellow card) 55'; Gentiletti (yellow card) 81'; Maurício (yellow card) 84'	Stadium: Stadio Luigi Ferraris; Attendance: 20,560; Referee: Nicola Rizzoli

1 May 2016 36	Palermo	2–0	Sampdoria	Palermo
15:00 CEST (UTC+02:00)	Vázquez 19'; Maresca (yellow card) 45+2'; Krstičić 85' (o.g.)	Report	Krstičić (yellow card) 6'; Dodô (yellow card) 30'; Muriel (yellow card) 63'; Cassani (yellow card) 77'; Viviano (yellow card) 83'	Stadium: Stadio Renzo Barbera; Attendance: 10,023; Referee: Paolo Mazzoleni

8 May 2016 37	Sampdoria	0–3	Genoa	Genoa
15:00 CEST (UTC+02:00)	Viviano (yellow card) 29'; Diakité (yellow card) 55'; Soriano (yellow card) 58'; Fernando (yellow card) 72'; Sala (yellow card) 78'	Report	Pavoletti 3'; Suso 26', 74', (yellow card) 31'; De Maio (yellow card) 35'; Rincón (yellow card) 60'; Burdisso (yellow card) 68'	Stadium: Stadio Luigi Ferraris; Attendance: 31,375; Referee: Luca Banti

14 May 2016 38	Juventus	5–0	Sampdoria	Turin
17:00 CEST (UTC+02:00)	Evra 6'; Dybala 15' (pen.), 37'; Chiellini (yellow card) 21', (goal) 77'; Hernanes (yellow card) 35'; Sturaro (yellow card) 72'; Bonucci 85'	Report	Škriniar (red card) 14'; Sala (yellow card) 37'	Stadium: Juventus Stadium; Attendance: 39,272; Referee: Claudio Gavillucci

=== Coppa Italia ===
17 December 2015 Round of 16	Sampdoria	0–2	Milan	Genoa
21:00 CET (UTC+01:00)	Christodoulopoulos (yellow card) 61'; Zukanović (yellow card) 64' (red card) 64'	Report	Bertolacci (yellow card) 5'; Mexès (yellow card) 16'; Abate (yellow card) 34'; Niang 50'; De Sciglio (yellow card) 61'; Bacca 90+3'	Stadium: Stadio Luigi Ferraris; Attendance: 11,200; Referee: Domenico Celi

=== UEFA Europa League ===
==== Third qualifying round ====
30 July 2015 First leg	Sampdoria (Italy)	0–4	(Serbia) Vojvodina	Turin, Italy
21:00 CEST (UTC+02:00)		Report	Ivanić 4'; Sekulić (yellow card) 21'; Stanisavljević 49', (yellow card) 54'; Pankov (yellow card) 51'; Ožegović 58', 90+1'	Stadium: Stadio Olimpico di Torino; Attendance: 4,200; Referee: Andreas Ekberg (Sweden)

6 August 2015 Second leg	Vojvodina (Serbia)	0–2 (4–2 agg.)	(Italy) Sampdoria	Novi Sad, Serbia
21:00 CEST (UTC+02:00)	Maksimović (yellow card) 63'	Report	Éder 15', (yellow card) 68'; Fernando (yellow card) 47'; Coda (yellow card) 65'; Muriel 70'; Krstičić (yellow card) 72'; Cassani (yellow card) 83'; Ivan (yellow card) 89'	Stadium: Karađorđe Stadium; Attendance: 10,763; Referee: Paweł Raczkowski (Poland)

== Statistics ==
=== Appearances and goals ===
No.	Pos	Nat	Player	Total		Serie A		Coppa Italia		Europa League	
No.	Pos	Nat	Player	Apps	Goals	Apps	Goals	Apps	Goals	Apps	Goals
Goalkeepers
1	GK	(Italy) ITA	Christian Puggioni	0	0	0	0	0	0	0	0
2	GK	(Italy) ITA	Emiliano Viviano	40	0	37	0	1	0	2	0
57	GK	(Italy) ITA	Alberto Brignoli	1	0	1	0	0	0	0	0
96	GK	(Italy) ITA	Samuele Massolo	0	0	0	0	0	0	0	0
Defenders
3	DF	(Algeria) ALG	Djamel Mesbah	8	0	6+1	0	0+1	0	0	0
4	DF	(Finland) FIN	Niklas Moisander	23	0	19+3	0	1	0	0	0
5	DF	(Italy) ITA	Mattia Cassani	28	0	23+2	0	1	0	2	0
11	DF	(Brazil) BRA	Dodô	17	0	16+1	0	0	0	0	0
13	DF	(Portugal) POR	Pedro Pereira	9	0	7+2	0	0	0	0	0
16	DF	(Italy) ITA	Andrea Ranocchia	14	0	13+1	0	0	0	0	0
23	DF	(France) FRA	Modibo Diakité	8	0	7+1	0	0	0	0	0
26	DF	(Argentina) ARG	Matías Silvestre	27	0	21+4	0	0	0	2	0
29	DF	(Italy) ITA	Lorenzo De Silvestri	17	1	17	1	0	0	0	0
37	DF	(Slovenia) SLO	Milan Škriniar	3	0	2+1	0	0	0		
Midfielders
7	MF	(Brazil) BRA	Fernando	38	4	34+1	4	1	0	2	0
8	MF	(Paraguay) PAR	Édgar Barreto	32	0	26+4	0	0	0	2	0
10	MF	(Argentina) ARG	Joaquín Correa	25	3	14+11	3	0	0	0	0
17	MF	(Italy) ITA	Angelo Palombo	8	0	3+4	0	0	0	1	0
18	MF	(Greece) GRE	Lazaros Christodoulopoulos	11	1	3+7	1	0+1	0	0	0
20	MF	(Serbia) SRB	Nenad Krstičić	12	0	6+4	0	0	0	2	0
21	MF	(Italy) ITA	Roberto Soriano	40	8	33+4	8	1	0	2	0
22	MF	(Italy) ITA	Jacopo Sala	5	0	3+2	0	0	0	0	0
25	MF	(Argentina) ARG	Ricky Álvarez	13	1	9+4	1	0	0	0	0
77	MF	(Colombia) COL	Carlos Carbonero	15	0	11+3	0	1	0	0	0
95	MF	(Slovakia) SVK	Dávid Ivan	23	1	11+10	1	1	0	0+1	0
97	MF	(Italy) ITA	Leonardo Serinelli	0	0	0	0	0	0	0	0
Forwards
9	FW	(Spain) ESP	Alejandro Rodríguez	6	0	0+6	0	0	0	0	0
24	FW	(Colombia) COL	Luis Muriel	35	7	19+13	6	1	0	2	1
27	FW	(Italy) ITA	Fabio Quagliarella	16	3	13+3	3	0	0	0	0
30	FW	(Venezuela) VEN	Andrés Ponce	1	0	0+1	0	0	0	0	0
99	FW	(Italy) ITA	Antonio Cassano	25	2	14+10	2	0+1	0	0	0
Players transferred out during the season
6	DF	(Italy) ITA	Andrea Coda	5	0	2+2	0	0	0	1	0
11	FW	(Italy) ITA	Federico Bonazzoli	7	0	0+4	0	1	0	0+2	0
19	DF	(Italy) ITA	Vasco Regini	16	0	14	0	1	0	0+1	0
22	DF	(Poland) POL	Paweł Wszołek	4	0	0+2	0	0	0	0+2	0
23	FW	(Italy) ITA	Éder	21	13	19	12	0	0	2	1
87	DF	(Bosnia and Herzegovina) BIH	Ervin Zukanović	19	3	14+2	3	1	0	2	0
92	MF	(Italy) ITA	Michele Rocca	1	0	0+1	0	0	0	0	0

Last updated: 14 May 2016
Source: Competitions

=== Goalscorers ===
Rank	No.	Pos	Nat	Name	Serie A	Coppa Italia	UEFA EL	Total
1	23	FW	(Italy)	Éder	12	0	1	13
2	21	MF	(Italy)	Roberto Soriano	8	0	0	8
3	24	FW	(Colombia)	Luis Muriel	6	0	1	7
4	7	MF	(Brazil)	Fernando	4	0	0	4
5	10	MF	(Argentina)	Joaquín Correa	3	0	0	3
5	27	FW	(Italy)	Fabio Quagliarella	3	0	0	3
5	87	DF	(Bosnia and Herzegovina)	Ervin Zukanović	3	0	0	3
8	99	FW	(Italy)	Antonio Cassano	2	0	0	2
9	18	MF	(Greece)	Lazaros Christodoulopoulos	1	0	0	1
9	25	MF	(Argentina)	Ricky Álvarez	1	0	0	1
9	29	DF	(Italy)	Lorenzo De Silvestri	1	0	0	1
9	95	MF	(Slovakia)	Dávid Ivan	1	0	0	1
Own goal					3	0	0	3
Totals					48	0	2	50

Last updated: 14 May 2016

=== Clean sheets ===
Rank	No.	Pos	Nat	Name	Serie A	Coppa Italia	UEFA EL	Total
1	2	GK	(Italy)	Emiliano Viviano	7	0	1	8
Totals					7	0	1	8

Last updated: 14 May 2016
