= Ricky Álvarez =

Argentine footballer

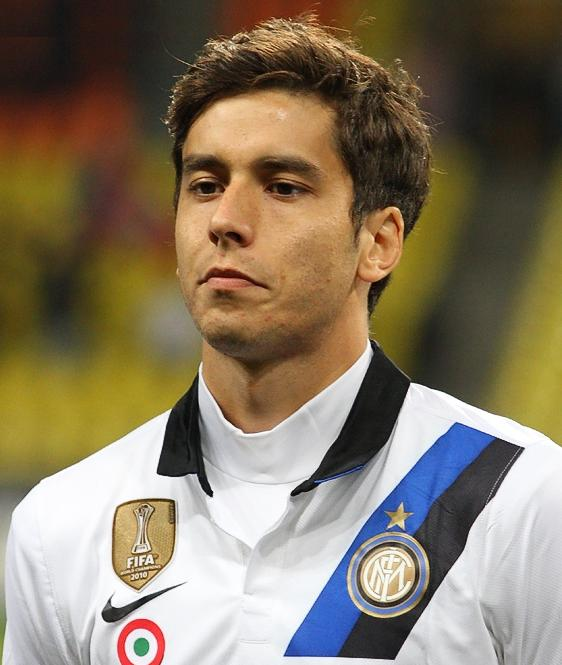
- Álvarez with Inter Milan in 2011

Personal information
- Full name: Ricardo Gabriel Álvarez
- Date of birth: 12 April 1988 (age 38)
- Place of birth: Buenos Aires, Argentina
- Height: 1.88 m (6 ft 2 in)
- Position: Attacking midfielder

Youth career
- 2005–2006: Boca Juniors
- 2006–2008: Vélez Sársfield

Senior career*
Years	Team	Apps	(Gls)
2008–2011	Vélez Sársfield	42	(5)
2011–2015	Inter Milan	73	(11)
2014–2015	→ Sunderland (loan)	13	(0)
2015	Sunderland	0	(0)
2016–2018	Sampdoria	46	(4)
2018–2020	Atlas	15	(0)
2020–2021	Vélez Sarsfield	21	(3)
Total		210	(23)

International career
2011–2014	Argentina	9	(1)
Medal record
Argentina
FIFA World Cup
Runner-up	2014 Brazil	Team
- * Club domestic league appearances and goals

Ricardo Gabriel "Ricky" Álvarez (Spanish pronunciation: [riˈkaɾðo ɣaˈβɾjel ˈalβaɾes]; born 12 April 1988) is an Argentine former professional footballer who played as an attacking midfielder.

Álvarez began his club career in Argentina in 2008 with Vélez Sársfield. His performances earned him a move to Italian club Inter Milan in 2011, where he remained until 2015. He joined English side Sunderland on-loan during the 2014–15 season, a move which was to become permanent should Sunderland retain their place in the Premier League for the following season. The deal ended in a legal dispute with Inter over the contract with the Court of Arbitration for Sport later ruling in Inter's favour. He returned to Italy, joining Sampdoria as a free agent in 2016. At international level, Álvarez was a member of the Argentine squad that reached the 2014 FIFA World Cup Final.

== Club career ==
=== Early career ===
As a child, Álvarez played papi fut for Caballito Juniors and Club Parque, then had a brief stay in Boca Juniors youth divisions.

=== Club Atlético Vélez Sársfield ===
Álvarez played his first professional game with Vélez Sársfield in 2008. Following his debut, he suffered a knee cruciate ligament injury that stalled his progression on the first team. He then was part of the 2009 Clausura-winning squad, playing only 18 minutes in the 1–0 victory over Gimnasia y Esgrima de Jujuy.

The midfielder's breakthrough with the team finally came during the 2010 Clausura, in which Vélez, forced by the tight fixture of the Copa Libertadores, played mostly with substitutes. He scored his first goal in a 1–2 defeat to River Plate at the Estadio Monumental and received his first red card from referee Javier Collado in Vélez's 1–3 defeat to Racing Club for complaining about a yellow card. He totalled 11 matches during the tournament (4 as a starter) and scored one goal.

Álvarez then played 15 games (2 starts) during Vélez's runner-up 2010 Apertura campaign. He also scored his second professional goal in his team's 1–0 home victory over Lanús for the 14th fixture.

During the first semester of 2011, Álvarez received significant fan and media praise for his league and Copa Libertadores' matches. He also showed versatility by playing all midfield positions. During that semester, he helped his team win the 2011 Clausura and reach the semi-finals of the Copa Libertadores.

=== Inter Milan ===
On 5 July 2011, Álvarez joined Italian club Inter Milan after the club paid Vélez a €12.8 million transfer fee for 90% of his rights. He debuted officially for his club in the 2011 Supercoppa Italiana defeat to Milan. Under the coaching of Claudio Ranieri, Álvarez began to establish himself in the team and showed that he can play as a trequartista. His first official goal for Inter came against Trabzonspor on 22 November 2011 after a neat one-two with international teammate Diego Milito. He scored again in his side's 4–1 victory over Lecce, a tap in from a well worked cross by Yuto Nagatomo.

In 2013, in 3–2 comeback win against Catania, Álvarez scored his first Inter goal. He scored two more on 7 April against Atalanta, although Inter lost that match 3–4 in the San Siro. Ten days later, in a Coppa Italia match at San Siro, he scored again against Roma, but Inter lost 2–3 in an eventual 5–3 aggregate loss. On 5 May, Álvarez scored from a penalty kick against Napoli at the Stadio San Paolo, but his team lost 3–1. Álvarez scored his tenth goal for Inter three days later against Lazio and also missed a penalty kick as Inter lost 1–3.

=== Sunderland ===
Álvarez joined English club Sunderland on September deadline day 2014. Álvarez initially signed on loan with a view to a permanent switch if Sunderland avoided relegation. Álvarez made his Premier League debut on 13 September 2014, playing 65 minutes in a 2–2 draw against Tottenham. He scored his first and only goal for the club on 3 February 2015 in a 3–1 win against Fulham in an FA Cup fourth-round replay. Álvarez suffered an injury to his right knee during a goalless draw with Swansea City in September 2014, which limited his appearances for the remainder of the season to 13 league games.

Sunderland avoided relegation and triggered the conditional obligation to buy Álvarez outright for €10.5 million. However, the club did not wish to buy Álvarez due to a dispute with Inter over the player's fitness. Following Alvarez's injury in September, Sunderland had approached Inter to get their approval to carry out surgery, but Inter refused. The automatic purchase clause in Álvarez's contract would have been void if the player suffered a flare-up of a known case of tendinopathy in his left knee which had then prevented him from playing. Sunderland's medical team claimed that the injury to his right knee had been accelerated by both the left knee tendinopathy and a previous micro surgical repair in his right knee which had not been initially disclosed by Inter. They argued the combination of factors voided the contract, and Sunderland were therefore not obliged to buy the player.

In 2017, the Court of Arbitration for Sport ruled that Sunderland were liable to pay Inter the transfer fee, rejecting Sunderland's argument on the basis that Sunderland's medical team had already found evidence of the micro-surgery to the right knee during the player's medical, but chose not to follow this up with Inter at the time. An appeal of the same ruling of FIFA was rejected. Nevertheless, as the transfer to Sunderland was considered complete and Álvarez did not sign a new contract with Sunderland, he was de facto a free agent after the expiry of loan meaning Sunderland were not able to recoup a transfer fee for the player when he later signed for Sampdoria.

In August 2019, after a lengthy legal battle, a FIFA tribunal ruled that Sunderland were liable to pay Velez Sarsfield €362,500 as part of the FIFA solidarity mechanism. On the back of the announcement, Sunderland's chairman also revealed that Álvarez had appealed to the Court of Arbitration for Sport over the amount awarded for lost earnings during the first half of the 2015–16 season while his contract ownership was under dispute. Alvarez won the appeal in January 2021 and was awarded £4,770,000 in compensation from Sunderland. It took Sunderland's total costs in relation to the Alvarez deal to more than £20m. Sunderland attempted to sue the club doctor who performed the Alvarez's medical for £13m in an effort to recoup some of the losses, though the lawsuit (and a subsequent counter-suit by the doctor) was dropped in March 2021 when Sunderland was bought by new owner Kyril Louis-Dreyfus.

=== Sampdoria ===
In the last days of December 2015, he was linked with a move to Italian side Sampdoria which was finally concluded on 4 January of the following year, with Álvarez signing a contract until 30 June 2016. He was also given number 25 shirt for the second part of 2015–16 season.

On 24 June 2016, Álvarez signed a new three-year contract. On 11 July 2018, he has officially terminated his contract with Sampdoria by mutual consent.

Álvarez retired from football at the end of 2021.

== International career ==
On 18 August 2011, Álvarez was called up to Argentina's senior squad. He made his debut on 2 September 2011 against Venezuela in a friendly. Four days later, Álvarez played in another friendly, this time against Nigeria. He made another appearance in the 2014 World Cup qualification match against Bolivia.

On 2 June 2014, Álvarez was called up for the 2014 FIFA World Cup.

== Style of play ==
A left-footed and technically gifted playmaker, Álvarez is usually deployed as an attacking midfielder, due to his ability to both score and create goals. He has been praised for his work-rate, stamina, and tactical versatility, and is capable of playing anywhere in midfield, as well as in several offensive positions; he has also been deployed as a second striker, as a central midfielder, or as a right winger, a position which allows him to cut inside and shoot on goal with his stronger left foot. Nicknamed Ricky Maravilla, he was regarded as a talented and promising prospect in his youth, and his elegant playing style, shy personality, height and physique initially drew comparisons with Kaká and Javier Pastore, although he has stated that his main inspirations as a footballer were Zinedine Zidane and Riquelme. His main attributes are his powerful striking ability from distance, dribbling skills, and creativity, which along with his movement and acceleration often sees him exploit spaces by embarking on trademark solo runs with the ball; however, he has also drawn criticism from pundits for his lack of pace and inconsistent performances. In recent seasons, his playing time has also been limited due to several injuries. As such, he has been accused in the media of failing to live up to his initial potential.

== Career statistics ==
=== Club ===
As of 20 May 2018

Appearances and goals by club, season and competition
Club	Season	League		Cup		Continental		Total	
Club	Season	Apps	Goals	Apps	Goals	Apps	Goals	Apps	Goals
Vélez Sársfield	2007–08	1	0	0	0	0	0	1	0
Vélez Sársfield	2008–09	1	0	0	0	0	0	1	0
Vélez Sársfield	2009–10	11	1	0	0	2	0	13	1
Vélez Sársfield	2010–11	29	4	0	0	11	1	40	5
Vélez Sársfield	Total	42	5	0	0	13	1	55	6
Inter Milan	2011–12	21	2	3	0	5	1	29	3
Inter Milan	2012–13	23	5	3	1	4	1	30	7
Inter Milan	2013–14	29	4	2	0	0	0	31	4
Inter Milan	Total	73	11	8	1	9	2	90	14
Sunderland (loan)	2014–15	13	0	4	1	0	0	11	1
Sampdoria	2015–16	13	1	0	0	0	0	13	1
Sampdoria	2016–17	21	2	2	1	0	0	23	3
Sampdoria	2017–18	12	1	3	0	0	0	15	1
Sampdoria	Total	46	4	5	1	0	0	51	5
Career total		169	20	16	3	22	3	207	26

=== International ===
As of 4 January 2016

Appearances and goals by national team and year
National team	Year	Apps	Goals
Argentina	2011	3	0
Argentina	2013	2	0
Argentina	2014	4	1
Argentina	Total	9	1

Scores and results list Argentina's goal tally first, score column indicates score after each Álvarez goal.

List of international goals scored by Ricky Álvarez
#	Date	Venue	Opponent	Score	Result	Competition
1.	7 June 2014	Estadio Ciudad de La Plata, La Plata, Argentina	Slovenia	1–0	2–0	Friendly

== Honours ==
Vélez Sársfield

- Argentine Primera División: 2011 Clausura

Inter Milan

- Supercoppa Italiana runner-up: 2011

Argentina

- FIFA World Cup runner-up: 2014
