= Alessio Hysaj =

Albanian footballer (born 1999)

Personal information
- Date of birth: 26 April 1999 (age 27)
- Place of birth: Altamura, Bari, Italy
- Height: 1.75 m (5 ft 9 in)
- Position: Right midfielder

Team information
- Current team: San Cataldo

Youth career
- –2017: Altamura
- 2017–2018: Matera

Senior career*
Years	Team	Apps	(Gls)
2016–2019	Matera	3	(0)
2019–2020	Altamura	9	(0)
2020–2021	Grumentum	5	(0)
2021	→ Termoli (loan)	4	(0)
2021–2023	Matera Grumentum	34	(2)
2023	Ginosa	12	(0)
2024–	San Cataldo	42	(1)

International career^{‡}
2017	Albania U19	3	(0)
- * Club domestic league appearances and goals as of 1 June 2025 ‡ National team caps and goals as of 3 March 2017

Alessio Hysaj (Albanian pronunciation: [aˈlɛsio hyˈsaj]; born 26 April 1999) is an Albanian footballer who plays as a right midfielder for Italian club San Cataldo.

Born in Altamura, Italy, Hysaj began his career with local side Altamura before joining Matera in 2017. He has since played for several clubs in the Italian lower divisions, including Grumentum, Termoli, Matera Grumentum, and Ginosa.

At international level, he represented the Albania under-19 national team in 2017.

== Club career ==
Hysaj began his senior career with Italian club Matera in the 2016–17 season, and over the next three seasons made three appearances in Serie C for the club.

He moved to Altamura in 2019, where he made nine league appearances during the 2019–20 season. In September 2020, he joined Grumentum Val d'Agri, before spending part of 2021 on loan at Termoli.

In mid-2021, Hysaj returned to the Matera region, signing for Matera Grumentum, where he made ten league appearances between 2021 and 2023. He subsequently played for Ginosa in early 2023, and in 2024 joined San Cataldo.

== International career ==
Hysaj represented the Albania under-19 national team in 2017, earning three caps. He was also part of the Albanian squad for the UEFA Under-19 Championship qualifiers, but did not feature in any of the matches.

== Personal life ==
Hysaj was born in Altamura, Italy, into an Albanian family originally from Shkodër, Albania. He is the cousin of Elseid Hysaj, who plays for Lazio and the Albania national team, and has a younger brother, Daniel Hysaj, who is also a footballer and plays in Serie D.

== Career statistics ==
=== Club ===
As of June 2025

Appearances and goals by club, season and competition
Club	Season	League			National cup		League cup (Note: Includes Coppa Italia Serie C and Coppa Italia Serie D)		Other		Total	
Club	Season	Division	Apps	Goals	Apps	Goals	Apps	Goals	Apps	Goals	Apps	Goals
Matera	2016–17	Serie C	0	0	—		0	0	—		0	0
Matera	2017–18	Serie C	0	0	—		0	0	—		0	0
Matera	2018–19	Serie C	3	0	2	0	0	0	—		5	0
Matera	Total		3	0	2	0	0	0	—		5	0
Altamura	2019–20	Serie D	9	0	3	0	2	0	—		14	0
Grumentum	2020–21	Eccellenza Basilicata	5	0	—		—		—		5	0
Termoli (loan)	2020–21	Eccellenza Molise	4	0	—		—		—		4	0
Termoli (loan)	Total		18	0	3	0	2	0	—		23	0
Matera Grumentum	2021–22	Eccellenza Basilicata	24	2	—		—		—		24	2
Matera Grumentum	2022–23	Serie D	10	0	4	0	1	0	—		15	0
Ginosa	2023–24	Eccellenza Apulia	12	0	—		—		—		12	0
Ginosa	Total		46	2	4	0	1	0	—		51	2
San Cataldo	2023–24	Eccellenza Basilicata	18	0	—		6	1	—		24	1
San Cataldo	2024–25	Eccellenza Basilicata	24	1	—		—		—		24	1
San Cataldo	Total		42	1	—		6	1	—		48	2
Career total			109	3	9	0	9	1	—		127	4
