= Elseid Hysaj =

Albanian footballer (born 1994)

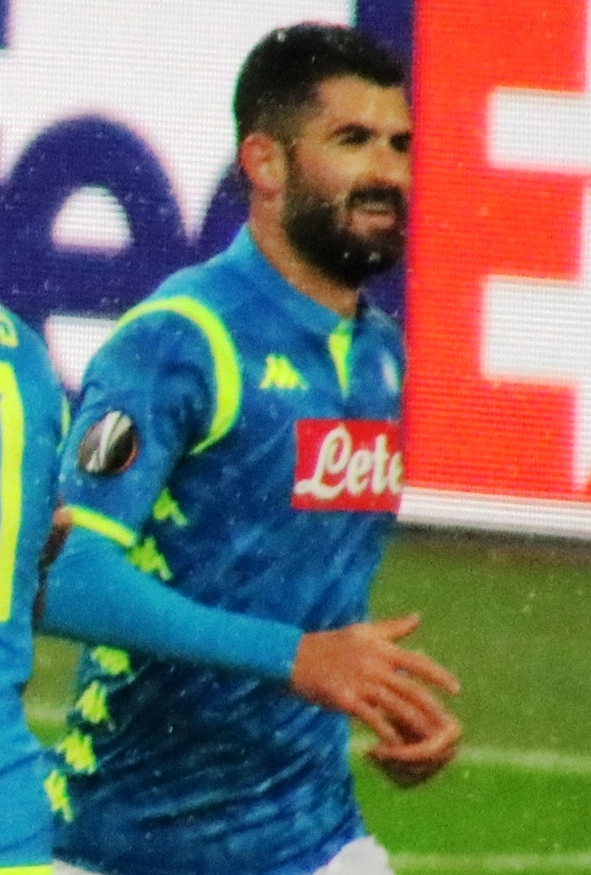
- Hysaj playing for Napoli in 2019

Personal information
- Date of birth: 2 February 1994 (age 32)
- Place of birth: Reç, Shkodër, Albania
- Height: 1.82 m (6 ft 0 in)
- Position: Full-back

Youth career
- 2001–2007: Shkodra
- 2007–2009: Vllaznia
- 2009–2012: Empoli

Senior career*
Years	Team	Apps	(Gls)
2011–2015	Empoli	102	(1)
2015–2021	Napoli	179	(1)
2021–2026	Lazio	101	(2)

International career^{‡}
2010	Albania U17	3	(0)
2013–2014	Albania U21	4	(0)
2013–	Albania	105	(3)
- * Club domestic league appearances and goals as of 18 April 2026 ‡ National team caps and goals as of 18:54, 15 November 2026 (UTC)

Elseid Hysaj (Albanian pronunciation: [ɛlsɛˈid ˈhysaj]; born 2 February 1994) is an Albanian professional footballer who plays as a full-back for the Albania national team.

Hysaj came through the youth system of Vllaznia before moving to Italy to join Empoli's youth team, making his senior debut in 2012 and becoming a regular starter by the following season before joining Napoli in 2015. He played for the club over 220 times in all competitions and won the 2019–20 Coppa Italia with the team. After the expiration of his contract in 2021, Hysaj joined Lazio in 2021 on a free transfer, and was part of the team that finished runners-up in Serie A, Lazio's first time in over two decades.

A full international since 2013, Hysaj has over 100 appearances and is Albania national team most capped player, which he captained on multiple occasions. He also represented the nation at the UEFA European Championship in 2016 and 2024.

== Early life ==
Hysaj was born in Reç, Shkodër, Albania. Two months after his birth, his father, Gëzim, emigrated to Italy in search of work to support the family. Hysaj grew up in Shkodër with his mother and grandparents while his father worked as a bricklayer in Italy.

Hysaj began playing football at the age of seven with Shkodra, an amateur club in his hometown. In 2007, he joined Vllaznia's youth team, where he spent two years. Through his father's work at the home of football agent Marco Piccioli, Hysaj came to his attention when he was 10 years old. Piccioli later arranged a trial for him at Fiorentina, where he impressed, but the club was unable to sign him due to bureaucratic restrictions concerning the registration of children of non-EU immigrants. Hysaj subsequently joined the Empoli academy in 2009, aged 15.

== Club career ==
=== Empoli ===
Hysaj played for the Empoli Primavera (under-19) side during the 2011–12 season, making 21 appearances and scoring one goal. He was included in Empoli's senior squad on a few occasions during the 2011–12 Serie B season but did not feature in the league. He made his professional debut on 24 November 2011 in a Coppa Italia match against Fiorentina, playing the full 90 minutes in a 2–1 defeat. In May 2012, he was part of the Primavera side that won the Toscana Cup, defeating Livorno 2–1 in the final.

Hysaj made his league debut on 20 October 2012 in a 2012–13 Serie B match against Virtus Lanciano, coming on as a 67th-minute substitute in a 3–0 away victory for Empoli. Under manager Maurizio Sarri, he established himself as a regular starter and helped Empoli reach the 2013 promotion play-off final, where they lost 2–1 on aggregate to Livorno. Hysaj completed the season with 35 appearances in all competitions, including 30 league appearances and four in the promotion play-offs, one in the Coppa Italia, and provided one assist.

On 19 September 2013, Hysaj renewed his contract with Empoli, extending it until 2015. He scored his first Serie B goal on 17 April 2014, opening the scoring in a 2–1 defeat to Virtus Lanciano; Empoli lost the match 2–1, but the goal was noted by the media for its individual quality and technical execution. On 30 May 2014, Empoli secured promotion to Serie A after a six-year absence, finishing second in 2013–14 Serie B.

Hysaj made his Serie A debut on 31 August 2014 in the opening match against Udinese, which ended in a 2–0 away defeat. On 31 October, he signed a new contract keeping him at the club until June 2017, with his annual salary increasing from €170,000 to €200,000. Following Empoli's goalless draw against Verona on 6 January 2015, Hysaj was included in Serie A Team of the Week for matchday 17. Hysaj had established himself as an important contributor in both defensive and attacking phases, demonstrating his ability to play on either flank. Following Empoli's 1–1 draw against Roma, he was noted for his involvement in the move that won his side a penalty and for completing 66 accurate passes, the highest tally in the match. In February, he provided assists for Massimo Maccarone in consecutive Serie A matches: a 2–0 win over Cesena on 8 February and a 1–1 draw against Milan a week later. In March 2015, he attracted interest from Bundesliga clubs Stuttgart and Hannover 96, having previously been linked with Lazio. Empoli finished 15th in 2014–15 Serie A, with Hysaj making 36 league appearances, including 33 starts, and three appearances in the 2014–15 Coppa Italia.

After four seasons with Empoli, Hysaj joined Napoli on 3 August 2015, reuniting with former manager Maurizio Sarri. He left Empoli having made 102 league appearances and seven appearances in the Coppa Italia, for 109 appearances in all competitions.

=== Napoli ===
On 3 August 2015, Hysaj completed the move to Napoli, signing a five-year contract for a reported fee of €5 million, plus bonuses. He became the second most expensive Albanian international player at the time, behind Lorik Cana’s €6.75 million move from Galatasaray to Lazio in July 2011.

==== 2015–16 season ====
Hysaj made his competitive debut for Napoli on 23 August 2015, starting in the opening Serie A match against Sassuolo, which Napoli lost 2–1 away from home. He subsequently established himself as a regular starter under Maurizio Sarri, featuring ahead of the more experienced Christian Maggio at right-back.

On 17 September 2015, Hysaj made his European debut in the UEFA Europa League, playing the full 90 minutes in Napoli's 5–0 home victory over Club Brugge. Hysaj remained a regular starter as Napoli won all five of their remaining group-stage matches to finish top of Group D, but were subsequently eliminated by Villarreal in the round of 32, with Hysaj starting both legs of the tie.

On 8 February 2016, sports journalist Gianluca Di Marzio included Hysaj in his selection of the best Serie A under-23 players, alongside Paul Pogba, Paulo Dybala, Mauro Icardi and M'Baye Niang. Calciomercato.it also named him the best right-back in Serie A for the season. Hysaj made 37 appearances in the 2015–16 Serie A, starting every league match, as Napoli finished second in the standings. In June 2016, Napoli rejected offers from Atlético Madrid and Bayern Munich for Hysaj, whom the club considered indispensable, with his agent confirming that talks over a contract renewal would follow. UEFA described him as an "attack-minded full-back", highlighting his ability to contribute both defensively and offensively, also noted his consistency, reporting that he had missed only one match during Napoli's league campaign.

==== 2016–17 season ====
On 13 September 2016, he made his Champions League debut, starting in a 2–1 away win over Dynamo Kyiv. He also played the full match in Napoli's 4–2 victory over Benfica on 28 September, his first Champions League appearance at the Stadio Diego Armando Maradona. The following day, he agreed to a new five-year contract with the club, with an option for an additional season.

Napoli finished top of Group B with 11 points and advanced to the round of 16, where they were eliminated by defending champions Real Madrid 6–2 on aggregate, where Hysaj started both legs of the tie. In the Coppa Italia, Napoli reached the semi-finals, where they were eliminated by Juventus 5–4 on aggregate. In Serie A, the club finished third with 86 points, while Hysaj made 35 appearances, starting 34 matches. He was ranked third among Napoli players for total minutes across all competitions. By season's end, his market value was estimated at €18 million, making him the most valuable player of the Albania national team.

==== 2017–18 season ====
Hysaj began the season on 19 August 2017, when he was sent off late in Napoli's 3–1 away win over Hellas Verona on the opening matchday of 2017–18 Serie A. Under Sarri's 4-3-3 system, Hysaj generally adopted a more conservative role than left-back Faouzi Ghoulam, often remaining deeper to provide defensive balance while Ghoulam advanced to support the attack. On 21 October, he made his 100th appearance in all competitions for Napoli in a goalless home draw against Internazionale.

In European competition, Hysaj made ten appearances, eight in the UEFA Champions League—including the qualifying play-off and group-stage—and two in the UEFA Europa League round of 32. During the Champions League group stage, he recorded 46 ball recoveries, the most among Napoli players, and ranked third in the team for completed passes in the final third, with 52. After finishing third in Group F, Napoli entered the Europa League round of 32, where they were eliminated by RB Leipzig on the away goals rule after a 3–3 aggregate draw, where Hysaj started the first leg and came on as a substitute in the second.

In Serie A, Hysaj made 35 appearances, all as a starter as Napoli finished runners-up with a club-record 91 points, four behind Juventus. In the Coppa Italia, Hysaj started both of Napoli's matches, playing 90 minutes in the round of 16 victory over Udinese and in their quarter-final elimination by Atalanta.

==== 2018–19 season ====
During the summer of 2018, Chelsea pursued Hysaj following the appointment of former Napoli manager Maurizio Sarri, but Napoli rejected the club's £43 million bid, as his agent later confirmed. In November 2018, his agent valued him at €60 million. In July 2019, FourFourTwo ranked him seventh in its list of the world's ten best right-backs.

With the arrival of manager Carlo Ancelotti, Hysaj faced increased competition for the right-back position from Kévin Malcuit, while Nikola Maksimović was also deployed in the role on occasion. In January 2019, Hysaj's agent threatened to request a transfer if the defender was no longer part of Ancelotti's plans, citing his reduced playing time. Ancelotti subsequently stated that Hysaj wished to remain at Napoli and that the club valued him. He made 27 appearances in 2018–19 Serie A, starting 24 matches, as Napoli finished runners-up. He also made one appearance in the 2018–19 Coppa Italia, starting in a 2–0 round of 16 win over Sassuolo.

In European competition, he made three appearances in the UEFA Champions League and four in the UEFA Europa League. Napoli reached the Europa League quarter-finals, where they were eliminated by Arsenal 3–0 on aggregate. During the Europa League campaign, La Gazzetta dello Sport described Hysaj as increasingly reliable and consistent.

==== 2019–20 season ====
Following the arrival of Giovanni Di Lorenzo in summer 2019, Hysaj lost his regular starting position at right-back, but continued to feature in both full-back positions under managers Carlo Ancelotti and Gennaro Gattuso. On 6 October 2019, he suffered a partial fracture of the sternum following a collision with Cristian Ansaldi during a league match against Torino, forcing him to leave the pitch on a stretcher.

In December 2019, following Ancelotti's departure and Gattuso's appointment, Hysaj's agent said the defender could leave in January if he did not receive more playing time. He made 20 appearances in 2019–20 Serie A, starting 17 matches and recording one goal and two assists. On 25 July 2020, he scored his first goal for Napoli, opening the scoring in a 2–0 league victory over Sassuolo.

In the 2019–20 Coppa Italia, Hysaj made four appearances, starting three matches and coming on as a substitute in the final, as Napoli defeated Juventus on penalties to win the trophy. On 7 May 2020, his agent announced that Hysaj would not renew his contract, which was due to expire the following year, and that they intended to seek a departure from Napoli.

==== 2020–21 season ====
In November 2020, while on international duty with Albania, Hysaj tested positive for COVID-19 and remained in isolation in Albania. After initially testing negative on 2 December and returning to team training, he tested positive again later that month. During the season, he continued to feature primarily at left-back, while also playing on the opposite flank. He made 24 appearances in Serie A, starting 20 matches and recording two assists.

In the UEFA Europa League, Hysaj made two appearances as Napoli were eliminated by Granada in the round of 32. In the Coppa Italia, he made three appearances as Napoli reached the semi-finals, where they were eliminated by Atalanta 3–1 on aggregate. Napoli finished fifth in Serie A with 77 points, one point behind fourth-placed Juventus, narrowly missing qualification for the UEFA Champions League. On 25 March 2021, Hysaj's agent confirmed that the defender would leave Napoli as a free agent at the end of the season, following unsuccessful attempts to agree a contract extension. He departed Napoli upon the expiration of his contract, ending his six-year spell at the club.

=== Lazio ===
After his contract with Napoli expired on 30 June 2021, Hysaj joined Lazio on a free transfer, signing a four-year contract and reuniting with former Napoli manager Maurizio Sarri, who had specifically requested his signing for his 4-3-3 system. During his introduction to the squad, he performed the partisan song Bella ciao as part of his initiation, provoking criticism and insults from a section of Lazio's ultras because of the song's association with the anti-fascist resistance in Italy. The club condemned the banner insulting Hysaj and expressed its support for the player in an official statement.

==== 2021–22 season ====
Hysaj made his Lazio debut on 21 August 2021, starting in a 3–1 away victory over his former club Empoli on the opening matchday of Serie A. A week later, he scored his first goal for the club in a 6–1 win over Spezia. Under Maurizio Sarri, he initially established himself as a regular starter, featuring on both sides of the defence. On 17 December 2021, Hysaj sustained an adductor injury during a 3–1 league victory over Genoa, leaving the pitch in the 63rd minute. He was scheduled to undergo further medical examinations to determine the extent of the injury.

In the second half of the season, Hysaj lost his regular starting place, with Adam Marušić and Manuel Lazzari moving ahead of him in the full-back positions. He made 29 appearances in Serie A, scoring once, as Lazio finished fifth with 64 points.

In the Europa League, Lazio were eliminated by Porto in the knockout round play-offs, losing 4–3 on aggregate. Hysaj made seven appearances in the competition. In the Coppa Italia, Lazio reached the quarter-finals, where they were eliminated by Milan following a 4–0 defeat. Hysaj made two appearances in the competition.

==== 2022–23 season ====
At the start of the 2022–23 campaign, Hysaj had limited playing time, but regained a regular starting position during the second half of the season, primarily operating as a left-back under Maurizio Sarri. He made 34 appearances in Serie A, scoring once, as Lazio finished runners-up with 74 points, 16 behind champions Napoli.

He scored his only goal of the season on 28 May 2023, opening the scoring in the fourth minute of a 3–2 home win over Cremonese, which moved Lazio back into second place with one match remaining.

In European competition, Lazio finished third in Group F of the Europa League, dropping into the Europa Conference League. After eliminating CFR Cluj in the knockout round play-offs, they were eliminated by AZ Alkmaar in the round of 16, losing 4–2 on aggregate. Hysaj made six appearances in the Europa League and two in the Conference League. In the Coppa Italia, Lazio reached the quarter-finals, where they were eliminated by Juventus following a 1–0 defeat. Hysaj made one appearance in the competition.

==== 2023–24 season ====
During the 2023–24 season, Hysaj alternated between starting and substitute roles, making 22 appearances in Serie A as Lazio finished seventh with 61 points. His season was described by Corriere dello Sport as one in which he had alternated between being overlooked and returning to the team.

In the Champions League, Hysaj made five appearances as Lazio advanced from the group stage and reached the round of 16, where they were eliminated by Bayern Munich 3–1 on aggregate. In the Coppa Italia, Lazio reached the semi-finals, where they were eliminated by Juventus 3–2 on aggregate; Hysaj made three appearances in the competition. He also made one appearance in the 2023 Supercoppa Italiana, coming on as a substitute in Lazio's 3–0 semi-final defeat to Internazionale.

==== 2024–25 season ====
At the beginning of the 2024–25 season, Hysaj was excluded from Lazio's squad lists for both Serie A and the Europa League, limiting his opportunities under manager Marco Baroni. His situation attracted interest from other Serie A clubs during the January transfer window, with reports suggesting that Lazio were open to his departure.

In February 2025, Hysaj was reinstated in Lazio's Serie A squad list, replacing Luca Pellegrini, and was subsequently added to the club's Europa League squad for the remainder of the competition. However, he sustained a muscle injury during a 2–1 away win over Cagliari on 3 February, which was diagnosed as a lesion to the femoral bicep in his left thigh.

Hysaj made 14 appearances in all competitions, playing 586 minutes without scoring, including 11 appearances in Serie A, one in the Coppa Italia and two in the Europa League.

==== 2025–26 season ====
Hysaj was initially included in Lazio's 2025–26 Serie A squad list for the season, but on 27 November 2025, the club removed him to accommodate the reinstatement of midfielder Fisayo Dele-Bashiru, making him ineligible for league selection. He returned to the matchday squad on 4 January 2026, remaining an unused substitute in a 2–0 defeat against Napoli. Three days later, he made his first appearance since his reinstatement, coming on as a substitute in a 2–2 draw against Fiorentina.

Hysaj made his final league appearance of the season on 18 April, coming on as a substitute in a 2–0 away victory over Napoli. He finished the campaign with five appearances and 170 minutes in Serie A, without scoring or providing an assist, and made no appearances in the Coppa Italia. After five seasons with Lazio, Hysaj left the club following the expiration of his contract on 30 June 2026.

=== Clubless period ===
Following the expiration of his contract with Lazio on 30 June 2026, Hysaj became a free agent. In July, Lecce reportedly made an offer for him as he sought to continue his career in Serie A. While awaiting a new club, he trained with Vllaznia in his hometown of Shkodër, with local media reporting his participation in the team's training sessions in September and again in November.

== International career ==
Born in Shkodër, Albania, and raised in Italy after emigrating with his family at a young age, Hysaj was eligible to represent both nations at international level. Despite being approached by the Italian Football Federation to join their youth setup, he chose to represent his country of birth, committing to the Albanian Football Federation from an early stage in his career.

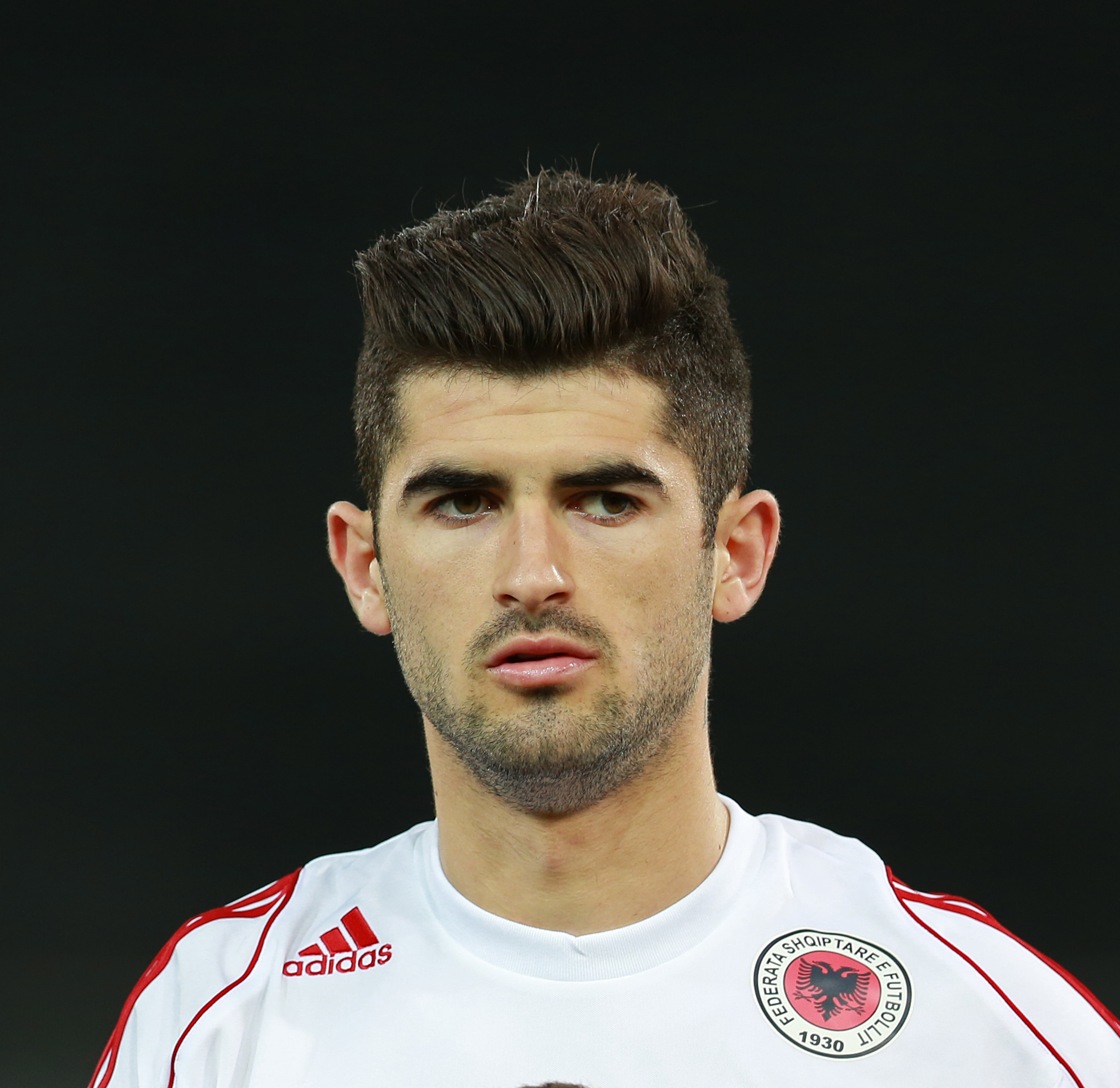
Hysaj with Albania U21 in 2014

Hysaj represented the under-17 side in the 2011 UEFA European Under-17 Football Championship qualifying round.

Following strong performances with Empoli in Serie B and upon the recommendation of Albania senior team’s assistant coach Paolo Tramezzani, manager Gianni De Biasi invited Hysaj for a friendly match against Georgia on 6 February 2013. He made his debut in that match aged 19, becoming one of the youngest players to appear for Albania in recent years.

Later next month, he made his first competitive appearance in a World Cup qualifier against Norway, coming on as a substitute in the 80th minute for Armend Dallku during a 1–0 away victory. He also appeared in the reverse fixture on 7 June 2013, entering as a late substitute for Ervin Bulku in a 1–1 draw. He remained part of the senior team in the remainder of the qualifying campaign as Albania failed to qualify.

After establishing himself in the senior setup, Hysaj briefly returned to the under-21 squad for the 2015 UEFA U21 qualifiers, debuting against Austria on 14 August 2013, where an own goal he conceded resulted in a 1–0 defeat. He later captained the U21 side in a 0–1 loss to Bosnia and Herzegovina on 15 October, and Austria again, with Albania earning a 3–1 away win in the latter match. and featured against Spain in a 2–0 defeat on 18 November 2013,

Following his consistent performances for both the under-21 and senior teams, and retirement from international duties of Armend Dallku, Hysaj became a regular starter for Albania from the UEFA Euro 2016 qualifying campaign onwards.

Hysaj made six appearances in Albania's eight matches during the UEFA Euro 2016 qualifying campaign under manager Gianni De Biasi. He started in the opening fixture, a 1–0 away victory over Portugal on 7 September 2014, Albania's first win against the Portuguese side.

On 14 October, Hysaj started Albania's qualifying match against Serbia in Belgrade. The match was abandoned in the 42nd minute following a confrontation between players and incidents involving Serbian supporters who invaded the pitch, after a drone carrying a banner depicting the map of Greater Albania flew over the stadium. The Court of Arbitration for Sport later awarded Albania a 3–0 forfeit victory, overturning UEFA's initial decision to award the match to Serbia. Hysaj also started Albania's final qualifying fixture, a 3–0 away win over Armenia on 11 October 2015, which secured the country's first qualification for a major international tournament.

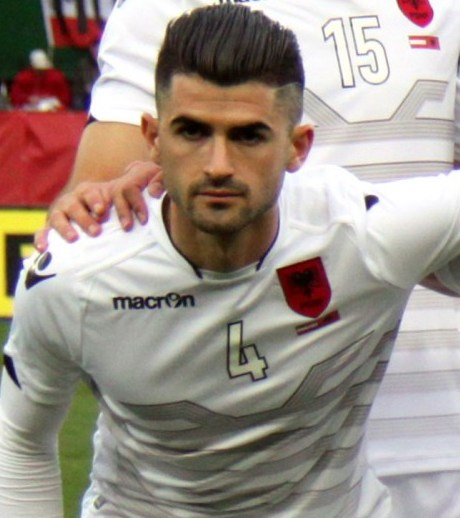
Hysaj with Albania in 2016

On 21 May 2016, Hysaj was named in Albania's preliminary 27-man squad for UEFA Euro 2016, and in Albania's final 23-man UEFA Euro squad on 31 May. On 28 May, he captained his side for the first time during the Euro 2016 warm-up match against Qatar, which ended in a 3–1 win, becoming the youngest ever captain.

Hysaj played every minute of Albania's Group A campaign, as the team finished third behind hosts France and Switzerland, and ahead of Romania following a 1–0 victory in the final match, with a goal by Armando Sadiku, concluding the group stage with three points and a −2 goal difference, ranking last among the third-placed teams, which led to their elimination. He was described by UEFA as an “attack-minded full-back” capable of contributing effectively in both defence and attack, highlighting his tactical maturity and versatility during the tournament. He was later listed among the candidates for the Best Young Player award of Euro 2016, praised for his balance between defensive awareness, attacking initiative, and fair play.

Hysaj retained his starting place in Albania's 2018 FIFA World Cup qualification campaign, and provided two assist in each two first matches. Hysaj added another assist on 11 June 2017, contributing to a 3–0 away victory over Israel that avenged the earlier defeat. Following the match, coach Gianni De Biasi resigned, but Hysaj remained a consistent starter for the remainder of the campaign, even after fellow Italian successor Christian Panucci. Albania ultimately finished third in Group G with 13 points.

In the inaugural UEFA Nations League campaign, Hysaj started all matches as Albania finished third in their League C group, earning one win and three defeats. He captained the side once, in the away fixture against Scotland. For the subsequent UEFA Euro 2020 qualification campaign, Hysaj was officially named captain ahead of the opening match against Turkey on 22 March 2019. After a 1–0 home defeat to Turkey and a run of poor results, head coach Christian Panucci was dismissed and replaced by Edoardo Reja.

Under Reja, Hysaj maintained his captaincy in the coach's debut match on 8 June 2019 against Iceland, though Albania lost 1–0. In subsequent fixtures, Reja temporarily handed the armband to veteran Mërgim Mavraj, before restoring it to Hysaj for the return match against Iceland on 10 September. In that fixture, Hysaj was deployed as a right midfielder in a 3–5–2 formation and scored his first international goal, contributing significantly to Albania's hard-fought 4–2 victory at home. Albania collected 13 points in Group H but ultimately finished fourth, thus failing to qualify for the finals.

In Albania's second participation in the UEFA Nations League, Hysaj captained the team in the opening match against Belarus on 4 September 2020, providing an assist and contributing to a 2–0 away victory. Due to injuries and COVID-19 restrictions, he featured in only two of the remaining five group matches. Despite his absence, Albania collected 11 points and topped their group, earning promotion to League B for the next edition.

During the 2022 FIFA World Cup qualification campaign, Hysaj's role as team captain was temporarily assumed by veteran goalkeeper Etrit Berisha, partly due to Hysaj's reduced club minutes at Napoli. Nevertheless, Hysaj remained a key starter throughout the qualifiers, providing defensive stability and experience as Albania achieved their highest-ever points total in a World Cup qualifying group. Albania recorded victories against Andorra, San Marino, and notably Hungary, but failed to secure points against group favourites England and Poland. Ultimately, Albania finished third in Group I, missing out on a play-off spot by just two points, but setting a national record with 18 points collected — their best-ever World Cup qualifying performance.

Due to the absence of a natural left-back in the squad, Hysaj was occasionally deployed on the left flank during the 2022–23 UEFA Nations League B campaign. He featured in all four group matches, captaining Albania in the away fixture against Israel; Albania recorded two identical 1–1 draws against Iceland and two 2–1 defeats to Israel, finishing third in the group but not being relegated to League C due to the suspension of Russia.

Following the appointment of Sylvinho as Albania's head coach in early 2023 ahead of the UEFA Euro 2024 qualifying, Hysaj was reinstated in his natural right-back position and reappointed as team captain, playing the full 90 minutes in all three opening matches of the UEFA Euro 2024 qualifying Group E in March and June 2023, during which Albania achieved two victories and one defeat, conceding only two goals. Later in September 2023, the captaincy was officially passed to Berat Djimsiti, though Hysaj remained a regular starter, being ever-present up until the penultimate match of the qualifying campaign assisting once, as Albania maintained a strong run of form, recording two additional victories and three draws, conceding only two other goals, securing qualification for the final tournament one match before the end of the campaign, marking their second-ever qualification for a European Championship. They ultimately finished top of their group for the first time in history, collecting 15 points—level with the Czech Republic but ahead on head-to-head record.

In June 2024, Hysaj was included in Sylvinho's final 26-man squad for UEFA Euro 2024 finals in Germany. He featured in Albania's first two group matches of Group B, starting against Italy and Croatia. In the opening 2–1 defeat to Italy, Hysaj was involved in the action leading to the decisive goal, drawing criticism from several media outlets. He was again criticised for his performance in the 2–2 draw with Croatia, where Albania conceded an equaliser from his defensive side. As a result, coach Sylvinho opted to leave him on the bench for the final match against Spain, giving the starting role to Iván Balliu. Albania finished bottom of the group with one point and were eliminated from the tournament.

In the opening match of the 2024–25 UEFA Nations League on 7 September 2024 against Ukraine, Hysaj returned to captaincy in the absence of Berat Djimsiti, leading Albania to a 2–1 away victory in Prague. He continued to serve as captain in the following two fixtures, but after back-to-back defeats to Georgia and the Czech Republic, coach Sylvinho rotated the squad, giving the starting position to Balliu for the remaining three matches. Albania secured a home win in the return fixture against Georgia, drew with the Czech Republic, and narrowly lost to Ukraine, finishing with seven points—level with Georgia and one behind Ukraine (8)—in a tightly contested group. As a result, Albania were relegated back to League C for the next edition.

During the 2026 FIFA World Cup qualification campaign, Hysaj did not play in Albania's first three Group K matches, then appeared in four consecutive full matches, in which Albania did not concede any goals, recording three wins and one draw to secure a play-off spot prior the final group match. In his first match against Serbia on 7 June 2025, Hysaj won a penalty, which was missed in a 0–0 draw. In the play-off round on 26 March 2026 against Poland, he played the full match as Albania led initially, but Poland won 2–1, eliminating Albania. Later that year, on 6 June, he made his 100th international appearance in a 1–0 friendly defeat against Luxembourg, becoming the first Albanian player to achieve this feat.

Despite being without a club, Hysaj continued to be called up to the Albania national team by head coach Rolando Maran. He was included in the squad for the opening four matches of the 2026–27 UEFA Nations League, announced in September 2026, and was subsequently retained for the final two group-stage fixtures against Finland and Belarus in November. On 12 November, Hysaj provided an assist in Albania's 2–0 victory over Finland, before scoring three days later in another 2–0 win against Belarus. These results secured Albania first place in Group C1 with 15 points and promotion to League B.

Hysaj's performances received further recognition, as he was selected as a right centre-back in Planet Football's team of the November international break, following his contributions in both victories. He was also included as a right-back in WhoScored's highest-rated team of the 2026–27 UEFA Nations League group stage, receiving an average rating of 7.65. He finished the group stage with one goal and two assists, becoming one of Albania's most productive players during the campaign.

== Personal life ==
On 9 June 2015, Hysaj became engaged to Miss Albania 2013, Fiorenza Lekstakaj. The couple married in June 2019. They have three children together: a son, Elis (born 2016), a daughter, Gloria (born 2021), and a younger son, Teo (born 2023).

Following Albania's historic participation at UEFA Euro 2016, Hysaj was among the members of the national team who were issued diplomatic passports by the Albanian government in recognition of their achievement. Hysaj is a supporter of the Socialist Party of Albania, having taken part in the 2017 electoral campaign in Shkodër.

He is also the cousin of footballers Alessio and Daniel Hysaj, both of whom playing in the Italian lower leagues.

== Career statistics ==
=== Club ===
As of match played 18 April 2026

Appearances and goals by club, season and competition
Club	Season	League			Coppa Italia		Europe		Other		Total	
Club	Season	Division	Apps	Goals	Apps	Goals	Apps	Goals	Apps	Goals	Apps	Goals
Empoli	2011–12	Serie B	0	0	1	0	—		—		1	0
Empoli	2012–13	Serie B	34	0	1	0	—		—		35	0
Empoli	2013–14	Serie B	32	1	2	0	—		—		34	1
Empoli	2014–15	Serie A	36	0	3	0	—		—		39	0
Empoli	Total		102	1	7	0	—		—		109	1
Napoli	2015–16	Serie A	37	0	1	0	5 (Note: All appearances in UEFA Europa League)	0	—		43	0
Napoli	2016–17	Serie A	35	0	3	0	7 (Note: All appearances in UEFA Champions League)	0	—		45	0
Napoli	2017–18	Serie A	35	0	2	0	10 (Note: Eight appearances in UEFA Champions League, two appearances in UEFA Europa League)	0	—		47	0
Napoli	2018–19	Serie A	27	0	1	0	7 (Note: Three appearances in UEFA Champions League, four appearances in UEFA Europa League)	0	—		35	0
Napoli	2019–20	Serie A	20	1	4	0	0	0	—		24	1
Napoli	2020–21	Serie A	24	0	3	0	2	0	0	0	29	0
Napoli	Total		179	1	14	0	31	0	0	0	225	1
Lazio	2021–22	Serie A	29	1	2	0	7	0	—		38	1
Lazio	2022–23	Serie A	34	1	1	0	8 (Note: Six appearances in UEFA Europa League, two appearances in UEFA Europa Conference League)	0	—		43	1
Lazio	2023–24	Serie A	22	0	3	0	5	0	1 (Note: Appearance in Supercoppa Italiana)	0	31	0
Lazio	2024–25	Serie A	11	0	1	0	2	0	—		14	0
Lazio	2025–26	Serie A	5	0	0	0	—		—		5	0
Lazio	Total		101	2	7	0	22	0	1	0	131	2
Career total			382	4	28	0	53	0	1	0	463	4

=== International ===
As of match played 15 November 2026

Appearances and goals by national team and year
National team	Year	Apps	Goals
Albania	2013	5	0
Albania	2014	7	0
Albania	2015	5	0
Albania	2016	11	0
Albania	2017	9	0
Albania	2018	7	0
Albania	2019	8	1
Albania	2020	4	0
Albania	2021	9	1
Albania	2022	9	0
Albania	2023	7	0
Albania	2024	8	0
Albania	2025	7	0
Albania	2026	9	1
Total		105	3

Scores and results list Albania's goal tally first, score column indicates score after each Hysaj goal.

List of international goals scored by Elseid Hysaj
No.	Date	Venue	Opponent	Score	Result	Competition
1	10 September 2019	Elbasan Arena, Elbasan, Albania	Iceland	2–1	4–2	UEFA Euro 2020 qualification
2	8 September 2021	Elbasan Arena, Elbasan, Albania	San Marino	4–0	5–0	2022 FIFA World Cup qualification
3	15 November 2026	Illovszky Rudolf Stadion, Budapest, Hungary	Belarus	2–0	2–0	2026–27 UEFA Nations League C

== Honours ==
Napoli

- Coppa Italia: 2019–20

== See also ==
- List of SSC Napoli players
- List of SS Lazio players
- List of men's footballers with 100 or more international caps
