= Papi fut =

Papi fut or Papi futbol is a popular Central American variety of football played on specially constructed outdoor courts also usable for regulation basketball. It is similar to FIFA football, but goals must be scored from within the goal area.
