= Irakli Shekiladze =

Georgian footballer

Personal information
- Date of birth: 17 September 1992 (age 34)
- Place of birth: Tbilisi, Georgia
- Height: 1.81 m (5 ft 11 in)
- Position: Forward

Youth career
- 2006–2007: Baia Zugdidi
- 2008–2011: Empoli

Senior career*
| Years | Team | Apps | (Gls) |
| 2007–2008 | Baia Zugdidi | 4 | (5) |
| 2011–2015 | Empoli | 12 | (0) |
| 2015 | Latina Calcio | 1 | (0) |
| 2015 | → Südtirol (loan) | 11 | (0) |
| 2015–2017 | Tuttocuoio | 62 | (16) |
| 2017–2018 | Spezia | 0 | (0) |
| 2018 | → Lucchese (loan) | 8 | (0) |
| 2019 | Savona | 3 | (0) |
| 2020–2021 | Emmenbrücke | 8 | (4) |
| Total | | 109 | (25) |

International career
| 2007–2008 | Georgia U17 | 9 | (5) |
| 2009–2010 | Georgia U19 | 9 | (0) |
| 2011–2012 | Georgia U21 | 9 | (1) |
- * Club domestic league appearances and goals

Irakli Shekiladze (born 17 September 1992) is a Georgian former footballer who played as a forward.

== Career ==
In 2020, Shekiladze joined Swiss club FC Emmenbrücke.
