= Davide Moro =

Italian footballer (born 1982)

Personal information
- Date of birth: 2 January 1982 (age 44)
- Place of birth: Taranto, Italy
- Height: 1.76 m (5 ft 9 in)
- Position: Central midfielder

Youth career
- 1999–2002: Empoli

Senior career*
Years	Team	Apps	(Gls)
2001–2015	Empoli	305	(9)
2002–2003	→ Sangiovannese (loan)	31	(1)
2003–2004	→ Varese (loan)	31	(0)
2009–2010	→ Livorno (loan)	28	(0)
2015–2016	Salernitana	54	(1)
2016–2017	Cremonese	22	(2)
2017–2018	Audace Cerignola	11	(0)
Total		482	(13)
- * Club domestic league appearances and goals

Davide Moro (born 2 January 1982) is an Italian former professional footballer who played as a central midfielder.

== Career ==
On 17 August 2009, Moro was loaned from Empoli to Livorno. He already played twice for Empoli in the 2009–10 Coppa Italia before leaving the club for fellow Tuscan side Livorno.

In the 2010–11 season he returned to Empoli and partnered with Mirko Valdifiori and Gianluca Musacci in central midfield, he was injured in November. On 9 December 2017, he was signed by Audace Cerignola.

He is also a singer, and covers Dream Theater songs with his band Progeny.
