= Francesco Karkalis =

Italian footballer

Personal information
- Date of birth: 19 January 1995 (age 31)
- Place of birth: Pescara, Italy
- Height: 1.81 m (5 ft 11 in)
- Position: Centre-back

Team information
- Current team: Lanciano FC

Youth career
- Angolana
- –2014: Pescara

Senior career*
Years	Team	Apps	(Gls)
2013–2019	Pescara	0	(0)
2014–2015	→ L'Aquila (loan)	11	(0)
2015–2016	→ Maceratese (loan)	27	(0)
2016–2017	→ Teramo (loan)	22	(0)
2017–2018	→ Bassano Virtus (loan)	29	(1)
2018–2019	→ Carrarese (loan)	28	(0)
2019–2020	Bisceglie	13	(0)
2021	Arezzo	7	(0)
2021–2022	Fano	15	(1)
2022	Livorno	13	(0)
2022–2023	Sambenedettese	10	(0)
2023–2024	Derthona	27	(0)
2024–2025	Fermana	28	(0)
2025–	Lanciano FC	4	(0)
- * Club domestic league appearances and goals as of 20:34, 21 september 2025 (UTC)

Francesco Karkalis (born 19 January 1995) is an Italian football player who plays for Eccellenza club Lanciano FC.

== Club career ==
He made his Serie C debut for L'Aquila on 11 October 2014 in a game against Lucchese.

On 19 November 2019 he signed with Serie C club Bisceglie.

On 4 January 2021 he joined Arezzo.

== Personal life ==
Born in Italy, Karkalis is of Greek descent through his father with roots from Thessaloniki.
