= Franco Signorelli =

Venezuelan footballer (born 1991)

Personal information
- Date of birth: 1 January 1991 (age 35)
- Place of birth: Mérida, Venezuela
- Height: 1.75 m (5 ft 9 in)
- Position: Midfielder

Youth career
- 2010–2011: Empoli

Senior career*
Years	Team	Apps	(Gls)
2010–2016	Empoli	115	(7)
2015–2016	→ Ternana (loan)	17	(0)
2016–2017	Spezia	13	(0)
2017–2019	Salernitana	21	(0)
2019	→ Voluntari (loan)	10	(0)
2019–2020	Voluntari	5	(0)
2020	Vibonese	5	(0)
2020–2021	Turris	19	(0)

International career^{‡}
2014–2015	Venezuela	3	(0)
- * Club domestic league appearances and goals as of 2 May 2021 ‡ National team caps and goals as of 4 September 2015

Franco Signorelli (born 1 January 1991) is a Venezuelan footballer who plays as a midfielder. He was awarded the award for the best goal in the Serie B 2011–12 season.

== Club career ==
On 30 August 2019, he was released from his contract with Salernitana by mutual consent.

On 7 February 2020, he signed with Serie C club Vibonese until the end of the 2019–20 season.

On 21 August 2020 he joined newly promoted Serie C club Turris.
