= Matías Vecino =

Uruguayan footballer (born 1991)

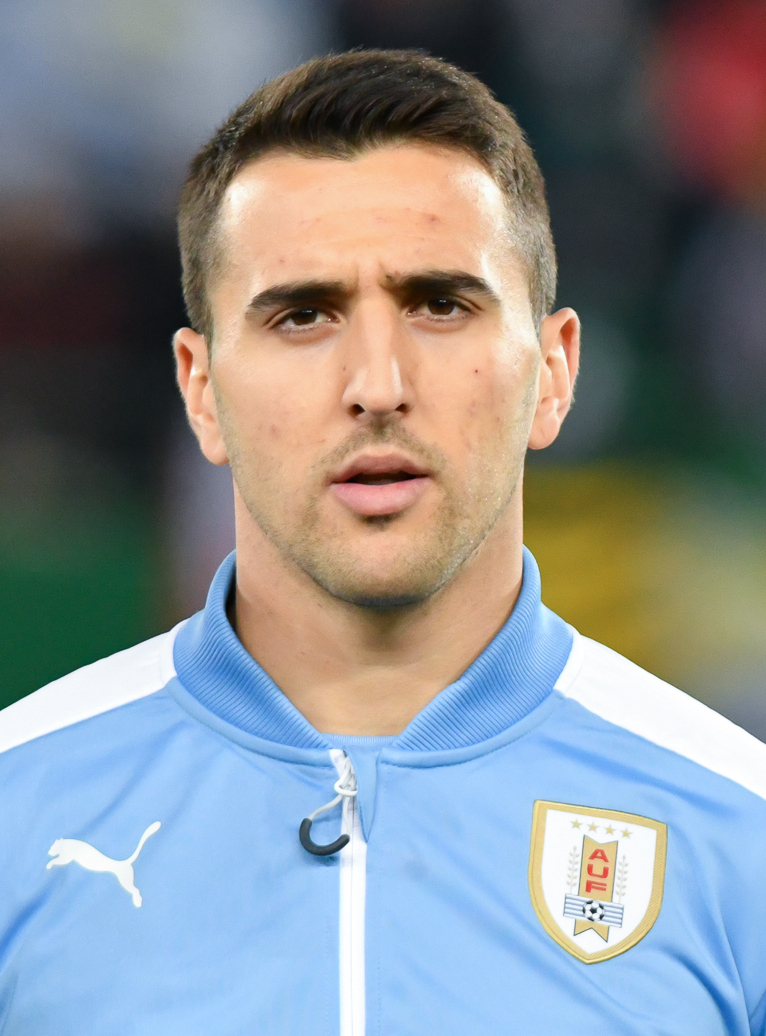
- Vecino with Uruguay in 2017

Personal information
- Full name: Matías Vecino Falero
- Date of birth: 24 August 1991 (age 35)
- Place of birth: Canelones, Uruguay
- Height: 1.89 m (6 ft 2 in)
- Position: Central midfielder

Youth career
- –2009: Central Español

Senior career*
Years	Team	Apps	(Gls)
2010–2011	Central Español	32	(2)
2011–2013	Nacional	18	(4)
2013–2017	Fiorentina	67	(5)
2014	→ Cagliari (loan)	9	(2)
2014–2015	→ Empoli (loan)	36	(2)
2017–2022	Inter Milan	104	(10)
2022–2026	Lazio	96	(10)
2026	Celta	6	(0)

International career
2010–2011	Uruguay U20	14	(4)
2016–2024	Uruguay	70	(6)
- * Club domestic league appearances and goals as of 23 August 2026

Matías Vecino Falero (born 24 August 1991) is a Uruguayan professional footballer who plays as a central or defensive midfielder.

== Club career ==
=== Early career ===
Vecino started his professional career in his native Uruguay with Central Español in 2010, before switching to Nacional for the 2011–12 season.

=== Fiorentina ===
In January 2013, Vecino joined Serie A side Fiorentina by penning a four-year contract for a reported transfer fee of €2.5 million. However, the transfer was delayed and became official in the next transfer window in August 2013.

On 3 September 2013, he was not included by manager Vincenzo Montella in his UEFA Europa League squad.

Vecino made his competitive debut as well as his first Serie A one on 26 September 2013 in a 2–1 away defeat against Inter Milan. He was used very scarcely during the first part of 2013–14 season, collecting only six appearances, only one as starter, leading the club to send him on loan at fellow Serie A side Cagliari until the end of the season, with an option to buy.

Vecino spent the 2014–15 season on loan at Empoli.

In mid-2015, Vecino returned to Florence and became a member of the first team. He signed a new five-year contract in 2016.

=== Inter Milan ===
On 31 July 2017, Fiorentina authorized Vecino to have a medical with Inter Milan, in order to complete a reported €24 million transfer. The transfer was made official on 2 August, with Vecino signing a contract until June 2021.

He was given squad number 11, and made his competitive debut on 20 August in the opening Serie A matchday against his former side Fiorentina, featuring for the full-90 minutes as Inter won 3–0. Vecino scored his maiden goal for the Nerazzurri six days later in the next match against Roma, netting the third goal in an eventual 3–1 away win, the club's first victory over Roma at the Stadio Olimpico for nine years.

On 20 May 2018, Vecino scored the winning goal vs Lazio, in Inter's 3–2 win, a victory which allowed the club to return to the UEFA Champions League after a six-year absence. On 18 September 2018, he scored an injury-time winning goal vs Tottenham Hotspur, in Inter's 2–1 win in the UEFA Champions League.

=== Lazio ===
On 1 August 2022, Vecino joined Lazio on a free transfer, signing a three-year contract.

=== Celta ===
On 2 February 2026, Vecino signed with Spanish club Celta Vigo until June 2027.

== International career ==
Vecino was born in Canelones, Uruguay, to a family of Italian ancestry, with roots in the city of Campobasso, and was eligible for both national teams. He has been capped by the Uruguay national under-20 team for the 2011 South American Youth Championship and for the 2011 FIFA U-20 World Cup. He scored the goal to help Uruguay qualify for the 2012 Olympic Games in London. Vecino's debut for the Uruguay senior team came on 25 March 2016 against Brazil.

In May 2018, he was named in Uruguay's provisional 26-man squad for the 2018 FIFA World Cup in Russia.

On 27 May 2024, Vecino announced his retirement from the national team.

== Career statistics ==
=== Club ===
As of match played 23 May 2026

Appearances and goals by club, season and competition
Club	Season	League			National cup (Note: Includes Coppa Italia)		Continental		Other		Total	
Club	Season	Division	Apps	Goals	Apps	Goals	Apps	Goals	Apps	Goals	Apps	Goals
Central Español	2009–10	Uruguayan Primera División	9	0	0	0	—		—		9	0
Central Español	2010–11	Uruguayan Primera División	23	2	0	0	—		—		23	2
Central Español	Total		32	2	0	0	—		—		32	2
Nacional	2011–12	Uruguayan Primera División	13	3	0	0	2 (Note: All appearances in Copa Libertadores)	0	—		15	3
Nacional	2012–13	Uruguayan Primera División	5	1	0	0	3 (Note: All appearances in Copa Sudamericana)	1	—		8	2
Nacional	Total		18	4	0	0	5	1	—		23	5
Fiorentina	2013–14	Serie A	6	0	1	0	—		—		7	0
Fiorentina	2015–16	Serie A	30	2	1	0	7 (Note: Appearances in UEFA Europa League)	0	—		38	2
Fiorentina	2016–17	Serie A	31	3	2	0	7	1	—		40	4
Fiorentina	Total		67	5	4	0	14	1	—		85	6
Cagliari (loan)	2013–14	Serie A	9	2	0	0	—		—		9	2
Empoli (loan)	2014–15	Serie A	36	2	2	0	—		—		38	2
Inter Milan	2017–18	Serie A	29	3	2	0	—		—		31	3
Inter Milan	2018–19	Serie A	30	3	1	0	9 (Note: Five appearances and one goal in UEFA Champions League, four appearances and one goal in UEFA Europa League)	2	—		40	5
Inter Milan	2019–20	Serie A	20	2	1	0	4 (Note: Three appearances and one goal in UEFA Champions League, one appearance in UEFA Europa League)	1	—		25	3
Inter Milan	2020–21	Serie A	8	1	0	0	0	0	—		8	1
Inter Milan	2021–22	Serie A	17	1	2	0	4 (Note: Appearances in UEFA Champions League)	0	0	0	23	1
Inter Milan	Total		104	10	6	0	17	3	0	0	127	13
Lazio	2022–23	Serie A	32	2	2	0	10 (Note: Six appearances and two goals in UEFA Europa League, four appearances in UEFA Europa Conference League)	2	—		44	4
Lazio	2023–24	Serie A	31	6	3	0	6	1	1 (Note: Appearance in Supercoppa Italiana)	0	41	7
Lazio	2024–25	Serie A	20	2	0	0	9	0	—		29	2
Lazio	2025–26	Serie A	13	0	1	0	—		—		14	0
Lazio	Total		96	10	6	0	25	3	1	0	128	13
Celta	2025–26	La Liga	6	0	—		6	0	—		12	0
Career total			368	35	18	0	67	8	1	0	454	43

=== International ===
As of match played 23 March 2024

Appearances and goals by national team and year
National team	Year	Apps	Goals
Uruguay	2016	9	1
Uruguay	2017	10	0
Uruguay	2018	12	1
Uruguay	2019	10	1
Uruguay	2020	0	0
Uruguay	2021	15	0
Uruguay	2022	9	1
Uruguay	2023	4	1
Uruguay	2024	1 (Note: Includes cap and goal against the Basque Country in a Non-FIFA friendly, which is counted as an official match by the Uruguayan Football Association.)	1
Total		70	6

Scores and results list Uruguay's goal tally first, score column indicates score after each Vecino goal.

International goals by date, venue, cap, opponent, score, result and competition
No.	Date	Venue	Cap	Opponent	Score	Result	Competition
1	27 May 2016	Estadio Centenario, Montevideo, Uruguay	3	Trinidad and Tobago	3–1	3–1	Friendly
2	12 October 2018	Seoul World Cup Stadium, Seoul, South Korea	29	South Korea	1–1	1–2	Friendly
3	25 March 2019	Guangxi Sports Center, Nanning, China	33	Thailand	1–0	4–0	2019 China Cup
4	2 June 2022	State Farm Stadium, Glendale, United States	58	Mexico	1–0	3–0	Friendly
5	28 March 2023	Seoul World Cup Stadium, Seoul, South Korea	67	South Korea	2–1	2–1	Friendly
6	23 March 2024	Estadio San Mamés, Bilbao, Spain	70	Basque Country	1–1	1–1	Friendly

== Honours ==
Nacional

- Uruguayan Primera División: 2011–12

Inter Milan

- Serie A: 2020–21
- Coppa Italia: 2021–22
- Supercoppa Italiana: 2021
- UEFA Europa League runner-up: 2019–20
