= Alessandro Giacomel =

Italian footballer (born 1998)

Personal information
- Date of birth: 9 July 1998 (age 28)
- Place of birth: Padua, Italy
- Height: 1.88 m (6 ft 2 in)
- Position: Goalkeeper

Team information
- Current team: Ars et Labor
- Number: 1

Youth career
- –2018: Empoli

Senior career*
Years	Team	Apps	(Gls)
2015–2019	Empoli	0	(0)
2016–2017	→ Pontedera (loan)	0	(0)
2018–2019	→ Virtus Verona (loan)	19	(0)
2019–2023	Virtus Verona	78	(0)
2024–2025	Caldiero Terme	21	(0)
2025–	Ars et Labor		

International career
2015–2016	Italy U18	2	(0)
- * Club domestic league appearances and goals as of 25 April 2025

Alessandro Giacomel (born 9 July 1998) is an Italian footballer who plays as a goalkeeper for Eccellenza club Ars et Labor.

== Club career ==
He made his Serie C debut for Virtus Verona on 26 September 2018 in a game against Pordenone.

On 29 July 2019, he moved to Virtus Verona on a permanent basis.

On 30 May 2024, Giacomel signed a two-year contract with Caldiero Terme in Serie C.
