= Dávid Ivan =

Slovak footballer

Personal information
- Date of birth: 26 February 1995 (age 31)
- Place of birth: Bratislava, Slovakia
- Height: 1.76 m (5 ft 9 in)
- Position: Midfielder

Youth career
- Slovan Duslo Šaľa
- 2007–2011: Nitra
- 2011–2015: Sampdoria

Senior career*
Years	Team	Apps	(Gls)
2015–2019	Sampdoria	21	(1)
2016–2017	→ Bari (loan)	8	(1)
2018	→ Pro Vercelli (loan)	0	(0)
2018–2019	→ Vis Pesaro (loan)	4	(0)
2019–2021	Chievo Verona	0	(0)
2021	→ Dynamo Brest (loan)	14	(0)
2022	Dynamo Brest	20	(0)
2023	Dinamo Tirana	6	(1)
2023–2024	Elbasani	20	(0)

International career^{‡}
2010–2011	Slovakia U16	5	(0)
2011	Slovakia U17	3	(0)
2012–2013	Slovakia U18	9	(0)
2013	Slovakia U19	7	(0)
2015	Slovakia U20	1	(0)
2015–2017	Slovakia U21	12	(1)
- * Club domestic league appearances and goals as of 11:19, 11 June 2024 (UTC) ‡ National team caps and goals as of 23 December 2017

Dávid Ivan (Slovak pronunciation: [ˈdaːʋit ˈiʋan]; born 26 February 1995) is a Slovak professional footballer who played in Serie A for Sampdoria as a midfielder.

== Club career ==
=== Youth career ===
Ivan played for Slovan Duslo Šaľa as a youth before joining Nitra in 2007. From the age of 15, he played for youth teams of Slovakia. After four years with Nitra, he signed for the youth team of Italian side Sampdoria in August 2011, penning a three-year contract.

=== Sampdoria ===
Ivan made his professional debut for Sampdoria against Carpi, on 23 August 2015. He was sent off for a second yellow card in the 82nd minute of the match, with Sampdoria winning 5–2 in the first match of the 2015–16 Serie A season. He scored his first goal for the club on 20 December 2015 against Palermo in the 76th minute of a 2–0 win, with the second goal of the game. Ivan was one of two Slovak players at Sampdoria, with Milan Škriniar also at the club in 2016. Having made 21 appearances in Serie A in his first season with the club, he went out on loan to second-tier Bari at the start of the 2016–17 season. He scored the second goal for Bari in a 3–0 Serie B win against Trapani in October that year.

On 17 August 2018, Ivan joined Vis Pesaro on loan until 30 June 2019.

=== Later career ===
On 3 July 2019, Ivan signed with Serie B club Chievo Verona. He joined Dynamo Brest on loan in 2021 to play in the 2021 Belarusian Premier League. He made his debut for the club in their first match of the season, a 4–0 win against Sputnik. Ivan left Chievo in the summer of 2021 after they were excluded from Serie B and signed for Dynamo Brest ahead of the 2022 season.
