= Mirko Valdifiori =

Italian footballer

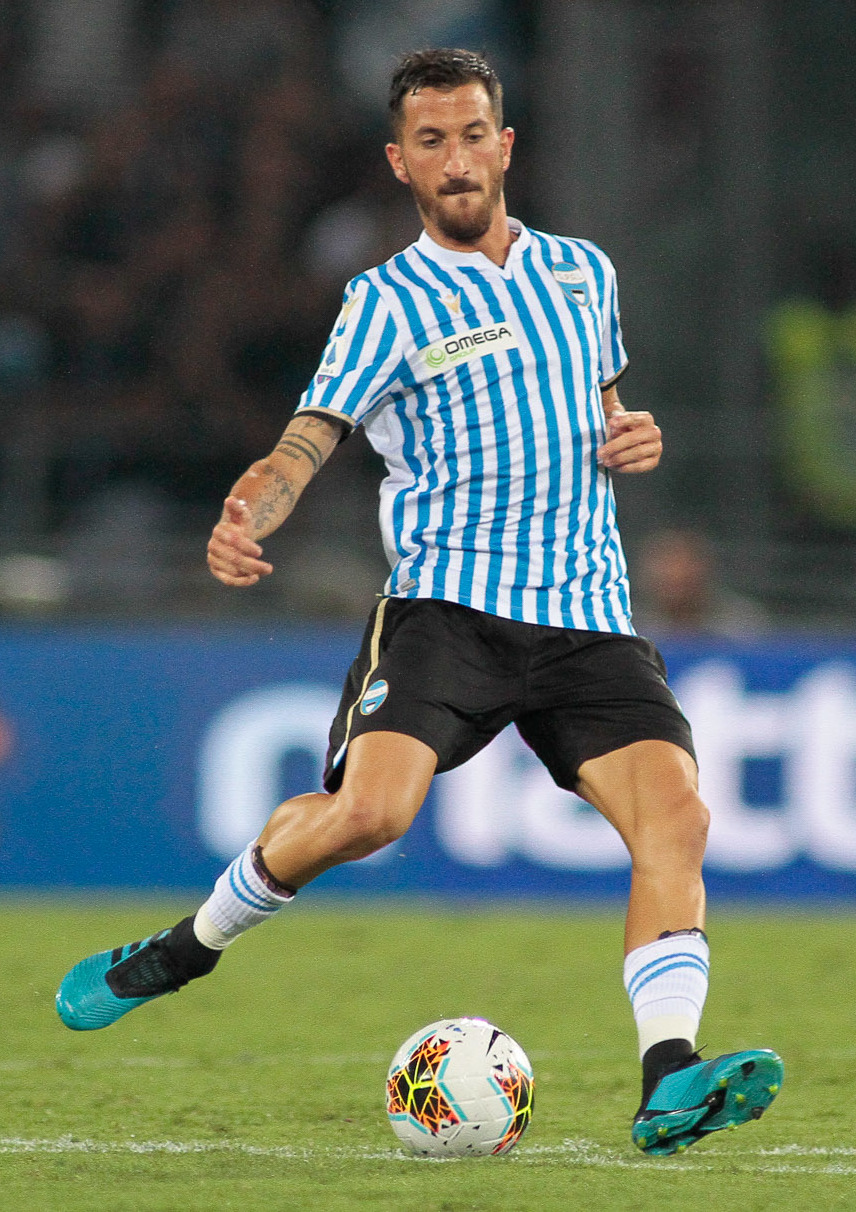

Personal information
- Date of birth: 21 April 1986 (age 40)
- Place of birth: Russi, Italy
- Height: 1.85 m (6 ft 1 in)
- Position: Central midfielder

Youth career
- Cesena

Senior career*
Years	Team	Apps	(Gls)
2004–2008	Cesena	3	(0)
2006–2007	→ Pavia (loan)	24	(0)
2007–2008	→ Legnano (loan)	17	(0)
2008–2015	Empoli	234	(4)
2015–2016	Napoli	7	(0)
2016–2018	Torino	37	(0)
2018–2020	SPAL	37	(0)
2020–2022	Pescara	27	(0)
2022–2024	Vis Pesaro	46	(0)

International career^{‡}
2015	Italy	1	(0)
- * Club domestic league appearances and goals as of 4 May 2024 ‡ National team caps and goals as of 10 December 2020

Mirko Valdifiori (Italian pronunciation: [ˈmirko valdiˈfjoːri]; born 21 April 1986) is an Italian professional footballer who plays as a midfielder.

A Cesena youth-product, he began his career with the senior side in 2004, but was sent on loan to Serie C sides Pavia and Legnano, before moving to Serie B side Empoli in 2008. With Empoli, he became the sixth most capped player in the team's history and helped the team achieve Serie A promotion in 2014. He made his debut in the Italian top division the following season, and his performances throughout the year earned him a transfer to Napoli in 2015. Following a successful first season in Serie A with Empoli, he also earned his first international call-up in 2015, making his Italy debut the same year.

== Club career ==
=== Cesena ===
Born in Russi, Ravenna, Valdifiori started his professional career at Italian club Cesena. A former member of the club's youth system, his debut for the Cesena senior side came on 14 May 2005, in a 3–3 away from home draw with Genoa, during the 2004–05 Serie B season. He made one further appearance that season, in the last round. The following season, the 2005–06 season, the youngster made just one appearance, coming off the bench. In order to gain more playing time, he went out on loan to Pavia for the 2006–07 season, where he made 24 Serie C1 appearances that season. The following season he went out on loan once more, this time to Legnano, who were then in Serie C1, and made 17 appearances for the side that season. The 2007–08 Serie B season also saw the relegation of Cesena to the Lega Pro Prima Divisione (formerly the Serie C1).

=== Empoli ===
In June 2008, Cesena sold Valdifiori to Serie B team Empoli in a co-ownership deal for €520,000. The defensive midfielder immediately became an important part of the first team at Empoli, playing 32 games during the 2008–09 season, as Empoli achieved a Serie B playoff spot for promotion, but unfortunately lost out to Brescia over two legs. In June 2009 Empoli signed Valdifiori outright for another €800,000.

The 2009–10 Serie B season was similarly strong for Valdifiori, who made 36 appearances and even managed his first professional goal - the 2nd in a 2–0 win over his former side Cesena.

In the 2010–11 Serie B season, Valdifiori remained a vital part of the Empoli set up, appearing in 38 matches, including his 100th for Empoli which came against Novara on the 8 April 2011. He also scored a career high two goals that season, with both of his strikes earning draws for his side.

In the 2011–12 Serie B season, the midfield maestro sat out for a long period of time, missing rounds 21–36 of the Serie B season due to injury. Empoli finished in the relegation playoff zone this season, but fortunately managed an aggregate 3–2 win over Vicenza to remain in Serie B the following season.

Empoli had a successful 2012–13 Serie B season, surprising everyone by managing to turn around their form from the previous season, thanks to the presence of a healthy Valdifiori, whose presence throughout the season was vital to the team's performances. The holding midfielder made 42 appearances, scoring 1 goal and providing 6 assists. Empoli finished in the playoff spots and beat Novara in the first playoff round, but lost to Livorno in the following stage of the playoff, falling one step short of promotion to Serie A.

Empoli finally achieved Serie A promotion during the 2013–14 Serie B season, which saw Valdifiori play a key part in the team's success, as he managed 8 assists in 40 appearances that season.

In the 2014–15 Serie A season, Valdifiori finally made his Serie A debut in a 2–0 loss to Udinese on the first match-day of the season. In the club's fourth-Round fixture against A.C. Milan, he was sent off after receiving two consecutive yellow cards in the 85th and 86th minute. In his Round 6 return against Palermo, he assisted twice to help his side to a 3–0 win over Palermo, their first Serie A win that season. He captained Empoli for the first time in Round 19, in a 0–0 draw against Internazionale.

=== Napoli ===
After having a very successful first season in the Italian top flight with Empoli, which saw him earn his first call up for the Italy national team by manager Antonio Conte, Valdifiori officially joined Napoli on 20 June 2015 for a reported fee of €5.5 million, where he was reunited with his former Empoli coach Maurizio Sarri, also becoming the manager's very first signing at the new club. Valdifiori signed a four-year contract which will earn him €900,000 a season.

=== Torino ===
On 31 August 2016, after having played as a starter for Napoli in the first round of the season, he was purchased outright by Torino.

=== SPAL ===
On 16 August 2018, Valdifiori signed with Serie A side SPAL.

=== Pescara ===
On 8 September 2020, Valdifiori signed with Serie B club Pescara. On 14 January 2022, his contract with Pescara was terminated by mutual consent.

=== Vis Pesaro ===
On 12 November 2022, Valdifiori joined Serie C club Vis Pesaro for the 2022–23 season.

== International career ==
In March 2015, Valdifiori was called up by coach Antonio Conte to the Italy squad for the first time, for a Euro 2016 qualifier against Bulgaria, and a friendly against England. On 31 March 2015 he made his debut in the latter match against England, starting the 1–1 draw at the Juventus Stadium in Turin, and making way for Marco Verratti after 67 minutes.

== Style of play ==
Valdifiori is a right-footed central midfielder who primarily plays as a deep-lying playmaker positioned ahead of the defensive line. In this role, he uses his passing range to direct team tempo and generate scoring opportunities. While not a frequent goalscorer, he is a designated set-piece taker responsible for delivering free kicks. He has cited Andrea Pirlo as an influence on his playing style.

== Career statistics ==
=== Club ===
As of match played 2 August 2020

Appearances and goals by club, season and competition
Club	Season	League			Coppa Italia		Continental		Other		Total	
Club	Season	Division	Apps	Goals	Apps	Goals	Apps	Goals	Apps	Goals	Apps	Goals
Cesena	2004–05	Serie B	2	0	0	0	—		—		2	0
Cesena	2005–06	Serie B	1	0	0	0	—		—		1	0
Cesena	Total		3	0	0	0	—		—		3	0
Pavia (loan)	2006–07	Serie C	24	0	1	0	—		—		25	0
Legnano (loan)	2007–08	Serie C1	17	0	0	0	—		—		17	0
Empoli	2008–09	Serie B	28	0	2	0	—		2 (Note: Appearances in Serie B promotion play-offs)	0	32	0
Empoli	2009–10	Serie B	34	1	2	0	—		—		36	1
Empoli	2010–11	Serie B	36	2	2	0	—		—		38	2
Empoli	2011–12	Serie B	23	0	2	0	—		2 (Note: Appearances in Serie B relegation play-offs)	0	27	0
Empoli	2012–13	Serie B	37	1	1	0	—		4	0	42	1
Empoli	2013–14	Serie B	40	0	2	0	—		—		42	0
Empoli	2014–15	Serie A	36	0	2	0	—		—		38	0
Empoli	Total		234	4	13	0	—		8	0	255	4
Napoli	2015–16	Serie A	6	0	2	0	7 (Note: Appearances in UEFA Europa League)	0	—		15	0
Napoli	2016–17	Serie A	1	0	0	0	—		—		1	0
Napoli	Total		7	0	2	0	7	0	—		16	0
Torino	2016–17	Serie A	24	0	1	0	—		—		25	0
Torino	2017–18	Serie A	13	0	2	0	—		—		15	0
Torino	Total		37	0	3	0	—		—		40	0
SPAL	2018–19	Serie A	15	0	1	0	—		—		16	0
SPAL	2019–20	Serie A	22	0	0	0	—		—		22	0
SPAL	Total		37	0	1	0	—		—		38	0
Career total			359	4	20	0	7	0	8	0	394	4

=== International ===
As of 15 February 2018

Italy
Year	Apps	Goals
2015	1	0
Total	1	0
