= 2015–16 Empoli FC season =

Empoli
2015–16 season
- President: Fabrizio Corsi
- Manager: Marco Giampaolo
- Stadium: Stadio Carlo Castellani
- Serie A: 10th
- Coppa Italia: Third round
- Top goalscorer: League: Massimo Maccarone (13); All: Massimo Maccarone (13)
- Highest home attendance: 14,693 vs Juventus (8 November 2015, Serie A)
- Lowest home attendance: 1,000 vs Vicenza (15 August 2015, Coppa Italia)
- Average home league attendance: 9,510
Home colours	Away colours	Third colours

The 2015–16 season was Empoli Football Club's second consecutive season in Serie A after their promotion from Serie B at the end of the 2013–14 season. Having finished 15th the previous season, Empoli is competing only in domestic competition, in both Serie A and the Coppa Italia.

Empoli's pre-season began with the departure of manager Maurizio Sarri to Napoli.

== Players ==
As of 29 August 2015.

Note: Flags indicate national team as defined under FIFA eligibility rules; some limited exceptions apply. Players may hold more than one non-FIFA nationality.

No.	Pos.	Nation	Player
1	GK	ITA	Maurizio Pugliesi
2	DF	FRA	Vincent Laurini
3	DF	ITA	Marco Zambelli
4	DF	ALB	Kastriot Dermaku
5	MF	ITA	Riccardo Saponara
6	DF	ITA	Luca Bittante
7	FW	ITA	Massimo Maccarone
9	FW	GEO	Levan Mchedlidze
11	MF	ITA	Daniele Croce
12	MF	BRA	Ronaldo Pompeu
13	MF	ITA	Raffaele Maiello (on loan from Napoli)
14	MF	SEN	Assane Dioussé
15	DF	ITA	Andrea Costa
17	MF	POL	Piotr Zieliński (on loan from Udinese)

No.	Pos.	Nation	Player
19	DF	ITA	Federico Barba
20	FW	ITA	Manuel Pucciarelli
21	DF	POR	Mário Rui
22	FW	ITA	Alessandro Piu
23	GK	ITA	Alberto Pelagotti
24	DF	SRB	Uroš Ćosić
26	DF	ITA	Lorenzo Tonelli
28	GK	POL	Łukasz Skorupski (on loan from Roma)
31	DF	ITA	Michele Camporese
32	MF	ARG	Leandro Paredes (on loan from Roma)
33	MF	BIH	Rade Krunić
39	FW	CRO	Marko Livaja (on loan from Rubin Kazan)
77	MF	LIE	Marcel Büchel (on loan from Juventus)

== Transfers ==
=== In ===
Date	Pos.	Name	From	Fee
25 July 2015	DF	(Italy) Michele Camporese	(Italy) Fiorentina	Undisclosed

==== Loans in ====
Date from	Date to	Pos.	Name	From

=== Out ===
Date	Pos.	Name	To	Fee

==== Loans out ====
Date	Pos.	Name	To	Fee

== Competitions ==
=== Serie A ===
==== League table ====
Pos	Team	Pld	W	D	L	GF	GA	GD	Pts
8	Lazio	38	15	9	14	52	52	0	54
9	Chievo	38	13	11	14	43	45	−2	50
10	Empoli	38	12	10	16	40	49	−9	46 (Note: Empoli ahead of Genoa on head-to-head goal difference; Empoli +1, Genoa –1.)
11	Genoa	38	13	7	18	45	48	−3	46
12	Torino	38	12	9	17	52	55	−3	45 (Note: Torino ahead of Atalanta on head-to-head points; Torino 6 points, Atalanta 0 points.)

Source: Serie A, Soccerway
Rules for classification: 1) Points; 2) Head-to-head points; 3) Head-to-head goal difference; 4) Goal difference; 5) Goals scored; 6) Draw.

==== Results summary ====
Overall								Home						Away					
Pld	W	D	L	GF	GA	GD	Pts	W	D	L	GF	GA	GD	W	D	L	GF	GA	GD
38	12	10	16	40	49	−9	46	7	6	6	22	20	+2	5	4	10	18	29	−11

Last updated: 15 May 2016.
Source: Competitive matches

==== Results by round ====
Round	1	2	3	4	5	6	7	8	9	10	11	12	13	14	15	16	17	18	19	20	21	22	23	24	25	26	27	28	29	30	31	32	33	34	35	36	37	38
Ground	H	A	H	A	H	A	H	A	H	A	A	H	A	H	A	H	A	H	A	A	H	A	H	A	H	A	H	A	H	H	A	H	A	H	A	H	A	H
Result	L	L	D	W	L	L	W	L	W	D	W	L	D	W	W	W	W	L	W	D	D	L	D	D	L	L	L	L	D	D	L	W	L	W	L	D	L	W
Position	18	18	17	14	14	17	16	17	15	13	12	13	16	12	10	9	8	8	7	8	8	9	8	8	9	10	11	11	11	11	14	12	12	12	11	10	12	10

Updated to match(es) played on 15 May 2016. Source: Competitive matches
A = Away; H = Home; W = Win; D = Draw; L = Loss

==== Matches ====
23 August 2015 1	Empoli	1–3	Chievo	Empoli
20:45 CEST (UTC+02:00)	Saponara 7', (yellow card) 65'	Report	Meggiorini (yellow card) 53', (goal) 55'; Birsa 60'; Paloschi 64'; Rigoni (yellow card) 80'	Stadium: Stadio Carlo Castellani; Attendance: 7,309; Referee: Maurizio Mariani

29 August 2015 2	Milan	2–1	Empoli	Milan
20:45 CEST (UTC+02:00)	Bacca 16'; Luiz Adriano 69'	Report	Saponara 20'; Tonelli (yellow card) 27'; Maccarone (yellow card) 42'	Stadium: San Siro; Attendance: 34,382; Referee: Piero Giacomelli

13 September 2015 3	Empoli	2–2	Napoli	Empoli
15:00 CEST (UTC+02:00)	Saponara 3'; Pucciarelli 18'; Croce (yellow card) 45+1'; Livaja (yellow card) 71'	Report	Insigne 7'; Allan (yellow card) 40', (goal) 50'; Valdifiori (yellow card) 58'; Jorginho (yellow card) 79'; Hysaj (yellow card) 87'	Stadium: Stadio Carlo Castellani; Attendance: 9,632; Referee: Luca Banti

19 September 2015 4	Udinese	1–2	Empoli	Udine
18:00 CEST (UTC+02:00)	Zapata 19'; Iturra (yellow card) 27'; Ali Adnan (yellow card) 30'; Kone (yellow card) 54' (yellow-red card) 72'; Fernandes (yellow card) 84'; Marquinho (yellow card) 90'	Report	Maccarone (yellow card) 38', (goal) 90+2'; Laurini (yellow card) 61'; Paredes 73'; Ronaldo (yellow card) 80'	Stadium: Stadio Friuli; Attendance: 15,000; Referee: Michael Fabbri

24 September 2015 5	Empoli	0–1	Atalanta	Empoli
20:45 CEST (UTC+02:00)	Saponara (yellow card) 86'; Dioussé (yellow card) 88'	Report	Toloi 31'; Pinilla (yellow card) 34'; Moralez (yellow card) 41'; Grassi (yellow card) 48'; Bellini (yellow card) 90'	Stadium: Stadio Carlo Castellani; Attendance: 7,625; Referee: Claudio Gavillucci

28 September 2015 6	Frosinone	2–0	Empoli	Frosinone
19:00 CEST (UTC+02:00)	Gori (yellow card) 17'; Soddimo (yellow card) 37'; Dionisi 58', 71'; Blanchard (yellow card) 79'	Report	Laurini (yellow card) 27'; Zieliński (yellow card) 51'; Tonelli (yellow card) 75'; Saponara (red card) 77'; Livaja (yellow card) 84'	Stadium: Stadio Matusa; Attendance: 7,165; Referee: Marco Guida

4 October 2015 7	Empoli	1–0	Sassuolo	Empoli
12:30 CEST (UTC+02:00)	Zieliński (yellow card) 16' (yellow-red card) 90'; Tonelli (yellow card) 26'; Maccarone 88'; Krunić (yellow card) 90+2'	Report	Terranova (yellow card) 17'; Peluso (yellow card) 36'; Vrsaljko (yellow card) 72'	Stadium: Stadio Carlo Castellani; Attendance: 7,634; Referee: Gianpaolo Calvarese

17 October 2015 8	Roma	3–1	Empoli	Rome
18:00 CEST (UTC+02:00)	Pjanić (yellow card) 37', (goal) 56'; De Rossi 59'; Salah 69'	Report	Dioussé (yellow card) 39'; Büchel 75'	Stadium: Stadio Olimpico; Attendance: 34,124; Referee: Piero Giacomelli

24 October 2015 9	Empoli	2–0	Genoa	Empoli
15:00 CET (UTC+01:00)	Tonelli (yellow card) 35'; Krunić 44'; Zieliński 57', (yellow card) 64'; Livaja (yellow card) 84'	Report	Marchese (yellow card) 29'; Muñoz (yellow card) 34'; Gakpé (yellow card) 52'	Stadium: Stadio Carlo Castellani; Attendance: 8,770; Referee: Domenico Celi

29 October 2015 10	Sampdoria	1–1	Empoli	Genoa
20:45 CET (UTC+01:00)	Soriano (yellow card) 41'; Muriel (yellow card) 65'; Éder 67'	Report	Costa (yellow card) 21'; Dioussé (yellow card) 52' (yellow-red card) 88'; Pucciarelli 60'; Büchel (yellow card) 71'; Skorupski (yellow card) 90+1'	Stadium: Stadio Luigi Ferraris; Attendance: 20,315; Referee: Angelo Cervellera

2 November 2015 11	Palermo	0–1	Empoli	Palermo
21:00 CET (UTC+01:00)	Brugman (yellow card) 27'; Lazaar (yellow card) 34'; Struna (yellow card) 43'; Anđelković (yellow card) 51'; Rispoli (yellow card) 54'; Quaison (yellow card) 59'	Report	Saponara (yellow card) 34', (goal) 53'; Mário Rui (yellow card) 74'; Maiello (yellow card) 88'	Stadium: Stadio Renzo Barbera; Attendance: 16,731; Referee: Marco Di Bello

8 November 2015 12	Empoli	1–3	Juventus	Empoli
15:00 CET (UTC+01:00)	Maccarone 19'; Mário Rui (yellow card) 58'; Krunić (yellow card) 69'	Report	Mandžukić 32'; Evra 38'; Morata (yellow card) 51'; Buffon (yellow card) 60'; Marchisio (yellow card) 81'; Dybala 84'	Stadium: Stadio Carlo Castellani; Attendance: 14,693; Referee: Davide Massa

22 November 2015 13	Fiorentina	2–2	Empoli	Florence
15:00 CET (UTC+01:00)	Rebić (yellow card) 24'; Vecino (yellow card) 26'; Suárez (yellow card) 30'; Kalinić 56', 61'; Bernardeschi (yellow card) 62'; Tomović (yellow card) 71'	Report	Büchel (yellow card) 14', (goal) 27'; Livaja 18', (yellow card) 71'; Zieliński (yellow card) 83'	Stadium: Stadio Artemio Franchi; Attendance: 27,618; Referee: Luca Banti

29 November 2015 14	Empoli	1–0	Lazio	Empoli
18:00 CET (UTC+01:00)	Tonelli 5', (yellow card) 33'; Paredes (yellow card) 16'; Livaja (yellow card) 28'; Pucciarelli (yellow card) 90+5'	Report		Stadium: Stadio Carlo Castellani; Attendance: 9,362; Referee: Michael Fabbri

6 December 2015 15	Hellas Verona	0–1	Empoli	Verona
15:00 CET (UTC+01:00)	Hallfreðsson (yellow card) 63'	Report	Mário Rui (yellow card) 6'; Costa (yellow card) 11', (goal) 61'; Büchel (yellow card) 40'; Paredes (yellow card) 60'	Stadium: Stadio Marc'Antonio Bentegodi; Attendance: 15,198; Referee: Paolo Tagliavento

13 December 2015 16	Empoli	3–0	Carpi	Empoli
15:00 CET (UTC+01:00)	Maccarone 46', 61'; Saponara 51'	Report	Gagliolo (yellow card) 65'; Di Gaudio (yellow card) 72'	Stadium: Stadio Carlo Castellani; Attendance: 8,863; Referee: Angelo Cervellera

19 December 2015 17	Bologna	2–3	Empoli	Bologna
20:45 CET (UTC+01:00)	Brienza 36'; Destro 45'; Pulgar (yellow card) 74'; Taïder (yellow card) 87'	Report	Pucciarelli 24'; Costa (yellow card) 34'; Maccarone 42', 48'; Laurini (yellow card) 56'; Skorupski (yellow card) 57'; Mário Rui (yellow card) 65'	Stadium: Stadio Renato Dall'Ara; Attendance: 19,214; Referee: Maurizio Mariani

6 January 2016 18	Empoli	0–1	Internazionale	Empoli
18:00 CET (UTC+01:00)	Paredes (yellow card) 26'; Croce (yellow card) 67'	Report	Murillo (yellow card) 16'; Brozović (yellow card) 35'; Icardi 45+1'	Stadium: Stadio Carlo Castellani; Attendance: 13,735; Referee: Domenico Celi

10 January 2016 19	Torino	0–1	Empoli	Turin
15:00 CET (UTC+01:00)	Molinaro (yellow card) 20'; Belotti (yellow card) 35'; Zappacosta (yellow card) 90'	Report	Büchel (yellow card) 26'; Livaja (yellow card) 32'; Maccarone (yellow card) 45+2', (goal) 56'; Barba (yellow card) 62'; Paredes (yellow card) 66'; Laurini (yellow card) 90+3'	Stadium: Stadio Olimpico di Torino; Attendance: 14,730; Referee: Andrea Gervasoni

17 January 2016 20	Chievo	1–1	Empoli	Verona
15:00 CET (UTC+01:00)	Paloschi 7'; Birsa (yellow card) 11'; Cesar (yellow card) 80'; Pinzi (yellow card) 90+2'	Report	Krunić (yellow card) 23'; Barba (yellow card) 41'; Tonelli 47'; Paredes (yellow card) 53'	Stadium: Stadio Marc'Antonio Bentegodi; Attendance: 8,000; Referee: Rosario Abisso

23 January 2016 21	Empoli	2–2	Milan	Empoli
20:45 CET (UTC+01:00)	Zieliński 32'; Barba (yellow card) 36'; Saponara (yellow card) 60'; Maccarone 61'	Report	Bacca 8'; Bonaventura 48'; Honda (yellow card) 59'; Montolivo (yellow card) 60'; Balotelli (yellow card) 82'; Romagnoli (yellow card) 90+1'	Stadium: Stadio Carlo Castellani; Attendance: 11,499; Referee: Carmine Russo

31 January 2016 22	Napoli	5–1	Empoli	Naples
15:00 CET (UTC+01:00)	Higuaín 33'; Reina (yellow card) 34'; Insigne 37'; Hysaj (yellow card) 39'; Allan (yellow card) 45'; Camporese 51' (o.g.); Callejón 83', 88'	Report	Paredes 28'; Zieliński (yellow card) 36'; Tonelli (yellow card) 50'; Büchel (yellow card) 79'	Stadium: Stadio San Paolo; Attendance: 39,986; Referee: Davide Massa

3 February 2016 23	Empoli	1–1	Udinese	Empoli
20:45 CET (UTC+01:00)	Croce (yellow card) 58'; Mchedlidze (yellow card) 82'; Paredes (yellow card) 89'; Pucciarelli 90'	Report	Zapata (yellow card) 16', (goal) 23'; Fernandes (yellow card) 50'; Badu (yellow card) 71'; Widmer (yellow card) 82'; Kuzmanović (yellow card) 85'; Hallfreðsson (yellow card) 89'	Stadium: Stadio Carlo Castellani; Attendance: 7,581; Referee: Eugenio Abbattista

7 February 2016 24	Atalanta	0–0	Empoli	Bergamo
18:00 CET (UTC+01:00)	De Roon (yellow card) 42'; Diamanti (yellow card) 69'; D'Alessandro (yellow card) 77'	Report	Büchel (yellow card) 13'; Tonelli (yellow card) 57'; Laurini (yellow card) 58'; Livaja (yellow card) 84'	Stadium: Stadio Atleti Azzurri d'Italia; Attendance: 12,352; Referee: Michael Fabbri

13 February 2016 25	Empoli	1–2	Frosinone	Empoli
15:00 CET (UTC+01:00)	Maccarone 59'; Büchel (yellow card) 63'; Mário Rui (yellow card) 90+3'	Report	Ciofani 17', 73' (pen.); Sammarco (yellow card) 35'; Blanchard (yellow card) 56'; Gori (yellow card) 58'; Tonev (yellow card) 64'; Rosi (yellow card) 69'; Longo (yellow card) 85'	Stadium: Stadio Carlo Castellani; Attendance: 7,897; Referee: Marco Di Bello

21 February 2016 26	Sassuolo	3–2	Empoli	Reggio Emilia
15:00 CET (UTC+01:00)	Missiroli (yellow card) 14' (yellow-red card) 31'; Berardi 41'; Defrel 48', 50'; Peluso (yellow card) 69'	Report	Tonelli (yellow card) 10' (yellow-red card) 38'; Zieliński 36'; Saponara (yellow card) 53'; Maccarone 70' (pen.)	Stadium: Mapei Stadium – Città del Tricolore; Attendance: 10,243; Referee: Paolo Valeri

27 February 2016 27	Empoli	1–3	Roma	Empoli
18:00 CET (UTC+01:00)	Pucciarelli (yellow card) 17'; Zukanović 22' (o.g.); Mário Rui (yellow card) 63' (yellow-red card) 90+4'	Report	El Shaarawy 5', 74'; Pjanić (yellow card) 17', (goal) 27'; Perotti (yellow card) 41'	Stadium: Stadio Carlo Castellani; Attendance: 12,761; Referee: Andrea Gervasoni

6 March 2016 28	Genoa	1–0	Empoli	Genoa
15:00 CET (UTC+01:00)	Rigoni 48'; Cerci (yellow card) 80'	Report	Zambelli (yellow card) 31'; Büchel (yellow card) 42'; Paredes (yellow card) 75'; Ćosić (yellow card) 86'	Stadium: Stadio Luigi Ferraris; Attendance: 21,134; Referee: Maurizio Mariani

12 March 2016 29	Empoli	1–1	Sampdoria	Empoli
18:00 CET (UTC+01:00)	Mário Rui (yellow card) 56'; Costa (yellow card) 69'; Laurini 82'	Report	De Silvestri (yellow card) 31'; Quagliarella 42'; Álvarez (yellow card) 78'; Christodoulopoulos (yellow card) 81'	Stadium: Stadio Carlo Castellani; Attendance: 8,752; Referee: Michael Fabbri

20 March 2016 30	Empoli	0–0	Palermo	Empoli
18:00 CET (UTC+01:00)	Paredes (yellow card) 68'	Report	Jajalo (yellow card) 55'; Bentivegna (yellow card) 81'	Stadium: Stadio Carlo Castellani; Attendance: 8,597; Referee: Davide Massa

2 April 2016 31	Juventus	1–0	Empoli	Turin
20:45 CEST (UTC+02:00)	Mandžukić 44'; Lichtsteiner (yellow card) 45+1'; Zaza (yellow card) 67'	Report	Paredes (yellow card) 53'; Tonelli (yellow card) 86'	Stadium: Juventus Stadium; Attendance: 39,260; Referee: Gianpaolo Calvarese

10 April 2016 32	Empoli	2–0	Fiorentina	Empoli
12:30 CEST (UTC+02:00)	Ćosić (yellow card) 23'; Pucciarelli 41'; Büchel (yellow card) 75'; Zieliński 88', (yellow card) 89'	Report	Roncaglia (yellow card) 24'; Vecino (yellow card) 33'; Alonso (yellow card) 61'; Astori (yellow card) 84'	Stadium: Stadio Carlo Castellani; Attendance: 9,651; Referee: Antonio Damato

17 April 2016 33	Lazio	2–0	Empoli	Rome
15:00 CEST (UTC+02:00)	Candreva 6' (pen.); Keita (yellow card) 27'; Biglia (yellow card) 28'; Parolo (yellow card) 30'; Onazi 44'	Report	Ćosić (yellow card) 6'; Mchedlidze (yellow card) 90'	Stadium: Stadio Olimpico; Attendance: 20,983; Referee: Angelo Cervellera

20 April 2016 34	Empoli	1–0	Hellas Verona	Empoli
20:45 CEST (UTC+02:00)	Saponara (yellow card) 44'; Maccarone 50'	Report	Viviani (yellow card) 16' (yellow-red card) 90'; Bianchetti (yellow card) 19'; Souprayen (yellow card) 26'; Wszołek (yellow card) 90+2'	Stadium: Stadio Carlo Castellani; Attendance: 7,816; Referee: Marco Serra

24 April 2016 35	Carpi	1–0	Empoli	Modena
19:00 CEST (UTC+02:00)	Crimi (yellow card) 21'; Lollo (yellow card) 30' (yellow-red card) 90'; Bianco (yellow card) 79'; Lasagna 85'; Mancosu (yellow card) 90+4'	Report	Ćosić (yellow card) 18'; Mchedlidze (red card) 25'; Zambelli (yellow card) 46'; Paredes (yellow card) 65'; Maccarone (yellow card) 90+5'	Stadium: Stadio Alberto Braglia; Attendance: 7,667; Referee: Paolo Valeri

1 May 2016 36	Empoli	0–0	Bologna	Empoli
15:00 CEST (UTC+02:00)		Report	Oikonomou (yellow card) 87'; Masina (yellow card) 90+4'	Stadium: Stadio Carlo Castellani; Attendance: 9,727; Referee: Daniele Chiffi

7 May 2016 37	Internazionale	2–1	Empoli	Milan
18:00 CEST (UTC+02:00)	Icardi 12'; Perišić 40', (yellow card) 88'; Nagatomo (yellow card) 50'; Handanović (yellow card) 87'	Report	Büchel (yellow card) 21'; Pucciarelli 37'	Stadium: San Siro; Attendance: 44,348; Referee: Marco Di Bello

15 May 2016 38	Empoli	2–1	Torino	Empoli
15:00 CEST (UTC+02:00)	Maccarone 12'; Zambelli (yellow card) 31'; Paredes (yellow card) 36'; Zieliński 54'	Report	Obi (yellow card) 26', (goal) 56'	Stadium: Stadio Carlo Castellani; Attendance: 8,791; Referee: Francesco Saia

=== Coppa Italia ===
15 August 2015 Third round	Empoli	0–1	Vicenza	Empoli
18:00 CEST (UTC+02:00)			Gatto 54'	Stadium: Stadio Carlo Castellani; Attendance: 1,000; Referee: Angelo Cervellera

== Statistics ==
=== Appearances and goals ===
No.	Pos	Nat	Player	Total		Serie A		Coppa Italia	
No.	Pos	Nat	Player	Apps	Goals	Apps	Goals	Apps	Goals
Goalkeepers
1	GK	(Italy) ITA	Maurizio Pugliesi	1	0	1	0	0	0
23	GK	(Italy) ITA	Alberto Pelagotti	6	0	6	0	0	0
28	GK	(Poland) POL	Łukasz Skorupski	32	0	31	0	1	0
Defenders
2	DF	(France) FRA	Vincent Laurini	25	1	24+1	1	0	0
3	DF	(Italy) ITA	Marco Zambelli	19	0	13+6	0	0	0
6	DF	(Italy) ITA	Luca Bittante	17	0	3+13	0	0+1	0
15	DF	(Italy) ITA	Andrea Costa	24	1	23+1	1	0	0
21	DF	(Portugal) POR	Mário Rui	37	0	36	0	1	0
24	DF	(Serbia) SRB	Uroš Ćosić	9	0	9	0	0	0
26	DF	(Italy) ITA	Lorenzo Tonelli	27	2	26	2	1	0
31	DF	(Italy) ITA	Michele Camporese	2	0	2	0	0	0
37	DF	(Italy) ITA	Lorenzo Ariaudo	5	0	5	0	0	0
Midfielders
5	MF	(Italy) ITA	Riccardo Saponara	34	5	32+1	5	1	0
11	MF	(Italy) ITA	Daniele Croce	29	0	19+9	0	1	0
13	MF	(Italy) ITA	Raffaele Maiello	12	0	4+8	0	0	0
14	MF	(Senegal) SEN	Assane Dioussé	16	0	9+6	0	0+1	0
17	MF	(Poland) POL	Piotr Zieliński	36	5	35	5	1	0
32	MF	(Argentina) ARG	Leandro Paredes	33	2	29+4	2	0	0
33	MF	(Bosnia and Herzegovina) BIH	Rade Krunić	16	1	5+10	1	0+1	0
77	MF	(Liechtenstein) LIE	Marcel Büchel	28	2	18+10	2	0	0
Forwards
7	FW	(Italy) ITA	Massimo Maccarone	38	13	35+2	13	1	0
9	FW	(Georgia (country)) GEO	Levan Mchedlidze	14	0	2+11	0	0+1	0
20	FW	(Italy) ITA	Manuel Pucciarelli	39	6	33+5	6	1	0
22	FW	(Italy) ITA	Alessandro Piu	10	0	2+8	0	0	0
39	FW	(Croatia) CRO	Marko Livaja	18	1	4+14	1	0	0
Players transferred out during the season
12	MF	(Brazil) BRA	Ronaldo	3	0	1+2	0	0	0
18	MF	(Venezuela) VEN	Franco Signorelli	1	0	0+1	0	0	0
19	DF	(Italy) ITA	Federico Barba	11	0	10	0	1	0
55	DF	(Italy) ITA	Luca Martinelli	2	0	1	0	0+1	0

Last updated: 15 May 2016
Source: Competitions

=== Goalscorers ===
Rank	No.	Pos	Nat	Name	Serie A	Coppa Italia	Total
1	7	FW	(Italy)	Massimo Maccarone	13	0	13
2	20	FW	(Italy)	Manuel Pucciarelli	6	0	6
3	5	MF	(Italy)	Riccardo Saponara	5	0	5
3	17	MF	(Poland)	Piotr Zieliński	5	0	5
5	26	DF	(Italy)	Lorenzo Tonelli	2	0	2
5	32	MF	(Argentina)	Leandro Paredes	2	0	2
5	77	MF	(Liechtenstein)	Marcel Büchel	2	0	2
8	2	DF	(France)	Vincent Laurini	1	0	1
8	15	DF	(Italy)	Andrea Costa	1	0	1
8	33	MF	(Bosnia and Herzegovina)	Rade Krunić	1	0	1
8	39	FW	(Croatia)	Marko Livaja	1	0	1
Own goal					1	0	1
Totals					40	0	40

Last updated: 15 May 2016

=== Clean sheets ===
Rank	No.	Pos	Nat	Name	Serie A	Coppa Italia	Total
1	28	GK	(Poland)	Łukasz Skorupski	9	0	9
2	23	GK	(Italy)	Alberto Pelagotti	3	0	3
Totals					12	0	12

Last updated: 1 May 2016
