= 2016–17 Empoli FC season =

Empoli
2016–17 season
- President: Fabrizio Corsi
- Manager: Giovanni Martusciello
- Stadium: Stadio Carlo Castellani
- Serie A: 18th (relegated)
- Coppa Italia: Fourth round
- Top goalscorer: League: Levan Mchedlidze (6); All: Massimo Maccarone, Levan Mchedlidze (6)
- Highest home attendance: 15,424 vs Juventus (2 October 2016, Serie A)
- Lowest home attendance: 644 vs Cesena (29 November 2016, Coppa Italia)
- Average home league attendance: 9,409
Home colours	Away colours	Third colours

The 2016–17 season was Empoli Football Club's third consecutive season in Serie A. The club competed in Serie A and in the Coppa Italia. The season proved to be a slow-rolling disaster for the club, as Empoli sat in 17th place for most of the season only to suffer a poor run of form at the tail end of the season at the same time as 18th-placed Crotone enjoyed a spectacular run of results; the result was Empoli dropping into 18th place on the very last day of the season, being relegated to Serie B.

== Players ==
=== Squad information ===
As of 9 January 2017

Note: Flags indicate national team as defined under FIFA eligibility rules; some limited exceptions apply. Players may hold more than one non-FIFA nationality.

No.	Pos.	Nation	Player
1	GK	ITA	Maurizio Pugliesi
2	DF	FRA	Vincent Laurini
3	DF	ITA	Marco Zambelli
4	DF	ITA	Federico Dimarco (on loan from Inter)
5	MF	ITA	Jose Mauri (on loan from Milan)
6	DF	ITA	Giuseppe Bellusci (on loan from Leeds)
7	FW	ITA	Massimo Maccarone (Captain)
8	MF	SEN	Assane Dioussé
9	FW	GEO	Levan Mchedlidze
10	MF	ITA	Riccardo Saponara
11	MF	ITA	Daniele Croce
13	DF	ALB	Frédéric Veseli
15	DF	ITA	Andrea Costa

No.	Pos.	Nation	Player
17	MF	ITA	Raffaele Maiello
19	DF	ITA	Federico Barba
20	FW	ITA	Manuel Pucciarelli
21	DF	ITA	Manuel Pasqual
23	GK	ITA	Alberto Pelagotti
24	DF	SRB	Uroš Ćosić
28	GK	POL	Łukasz Skorupski (on loan from Roma)
31	MF	BRA	Matheus
33	MF	BIH	Rade Krunić
77	MF	LIE	Marcel Büchel
88	MF	COL	Andrés Tello (on loan from Juventus)
89	FW	ITA	Guido Marilungo

== Transfers ==
=== In ===
Date	Pos.	Player	Age	Moving from	Fee	Notes	Source
31 May 2016	DF	(Italy) Manuel Pasqual	34	(Italy) Fiorentina	Free		
22 June 2016	MF	(Liechtenstein) Marcel Büchel	25	(Italy) Juventus	Undisclosed		
28 June 2016	MF	(Brazil) Matheus Pereira	18	(Brazil) Corinthians	Undisclosed		
7 July 2016	FW	(Italy) Alberto Gilardino	34	(Italy) Palermo	Free		
25 January 2017	MF	(Slovenia) Miha Zajc	22	(Slovenia) Olimpija Ljubljana	Undisclosed		

==== Loans in ====
Date	Pos.	Player	Age	Moving from	Fee	Notes	Source
1 July 2016	DF	(Italy) Giuseppe Bellusci	26	(England) Leeds United	Loan		
1 July 2016	DF	(Italy) Federico Dimarco	18	(Italy) Internazionale	Loan		
4 July 2016	MF	(Colombia) Andrés Tello	19	(Italy) Juventus	Loan		

=== Out ===
Date	Pos.	Player	Age	Moving to	Fee	Notes	Source
23 May 2016	DF	(Italy) Lorenzo Tonelli	26	(Italy) Napoli	Undisclosed		
9 January 2017	FW	(Italy) Alberto Gilardino	34	(Italy) Pescara	Free	Player rescinded contract with Empoli	

==== Loans out ====
Date	Pos.	Player	Age	Moving to	Fee	Notes	Source
8 July 2016	DF	(Portugal) Mário Rui	25	(Italy) Roma	€3M	Loan with a mandatory option to buy for €6M	
28 January 2017	MF	(Italy) Riccardo Saponara	25	(Italy) Fiorentina	Loan	18-month loan with an option to buy for €10M	

== Pre-season and friendlies ==
Friendly	v

== Competitions ==
=== Overall ===
Competition	Started round	Current position	Final position	First match	Last match
Serie A	Matchday 1	—	18th	21 August 2016	28 May 2017
Coppa Italia	Third round	—	Fourth round	13 August 2016	29 November 2016

Last updated: 28 May 2017

=== Serie A ===
==== League table ====
Pos	Team	Pld	W	D	L	GF	GA	GD	Pts	Qualification or relegation
16	Genoa	38	9	9	20	38	64	−26	36	
17	Crotone	38	9	7	22	34	58	−24	34	
18	Empoli (R)	38	8	8	22	29	61	−32	32	Relegation to Serie B
19	Palermo (R)	38	6	8	24	33	77	−44	26	Relegation to Serie B
20	Pescara (R)	38	3	9	26	37	81	−44	18	Relegation to Serie B

Source: Serie A, Soccerway
Rules for classification: 1) Points; 2) Head-to-head points; 3) Head-to-head goal difference; 4) Goal difference; 5) Goals scored; 6) Draw.
(R) Relegated

==== Results summary ====
Overall								Home						Away					
Pld	W	D	L	GF	GA	GD	Pts	W	D	L	GF	GA	GD	W	D	L	GF	GA	GD
38	8	8	22	29	61	−32	32	5	4	10	16	29	−13	3	4	12	13	32	−19

Last updated: 28 May 2017.
Source: Competitive matches

==== Results by round ====
Round	1	2	3	4	5	6	7	8	9	10	11	12	13	14	15	16	17	18	19	20	21	22	23	24	25	26	27	28	29	30	31	32	33	34	35	36	37	38
Ground	H	A	H	A	H	A	H	A	H	A	H	A	H	H	A	A	H	A	H	A	H	A	H	A	H	A	H	A	H	A	H	A	A	H	H	A	H	A
Result	L	L	W	D	L	L	L	D	D	L	D	W	L	L	L	D	W	L	W	D	W	L	D	L	L	L	L	L	L	L	D	W	W	L	W	L	L	L
Position	16	20	16	17	18	19	19	19	18	18	18	17	17	17	17	17	17	17	17	17	17	17	17	17	17	17	17	17	17	17	17	17	17	17	17	17	17	18

Updated to match(es) played on 28 May 2017. Source: Competitive matches
A = Away; H = Home; W = Win; D = Draw; L = Loss

==== Matches ====
21 August 2016 1	Empoli	0–1	Sampdoria	Empoli
20:45 CEST (UTC+02:00)	Büchel (yellow card) 77'; Maccarone (red card) 84'; Saponara (yellow card) 86'	Report	Muriel 37'; Linetty (yellow card) 61'; Barreto (yellow card) 68'; Pavlović (yellow card) 75'; Viviano (yellow card) 83'	Stadium: Stadio Carlo Castellani; Attendance: 8,047; Referee: Maurizio Mariani

28 August 2016 2	Udinese	2–0	Empoli	Udine
20:45 CEST (UTC+02:00)	Felipe 3', (yellow card) 24'; De Paul (yellow card) 78'; Karnezis (yellow card) 84'; Perica 90+5'	Report	Pucciarelli (yellow card) 53'; Barba (yellow card) 61'; Laurini (red card) 73'; Saponara (yellow card) 87'	Stadium: Stadio Friuli; Attendance: 13,239; Referee: Fabio Maresca

12 September 2016 3	Empoli	2–1	Crotone	Empoli
20:45 CEST (UTC+02:00)	Bellusci 31'; Costa 56'; Croce (yellow card) 90+4'	Report	Dussenne (yellow card) 23' (yellow-red card) 80'; Sampirisi 45+2'; Crisetig (yellow card) 52'	Stadium: Stadio Carlo Castellani; Attendance: 7,678; Referee: Paolo Valeri

18 September 2016 4	Torino	0–0	Empoli	Turin
15:00 CEST (UTC+02:00)	Molinaro (yellow card) 11'; Boyé (yellow card) 25'; Valdifiori (yellow card) 34'; Baselli (yellow card) 78'	Report	Tello (yellow card) 4'; Bellusci (yellow card) 41'; Dioussé (yellow card) 76'	Stadium: Stadio Olimpico Grande Torino; Attendance: 16,403; Referee: Daniele Chiffi

21 September 2016 5	Empoli	0–2	Internazionale	Empoli
20:45 CEST (UTC+02:00)	Maccarone (yellow card) 48'	Report	Murillo (yellow card) 3'; Icardi 10', 17'; Medel (yellow card) 23'; Miranda (yellow card) 25'; João Mário (yellow card) 59'	Stadium: Stadio Carlo Castellani; Attendance: 10,554; Referee: Marco Guida

25 September 2016 6	Lazio	2–0	Empoli	Rome
15:00 CEST (UTC+02:00)	Keita 29'; Felipe Anderson (yellow card) 35'; Cataldi (yellow card) 73'; Lulić 90'	Report	Zambelli (yellow card) 11'; Pasqual (yellow card) 58'	Stadium: Stadio Olimpico; Attendance: 10,100; Referee: Michael Fabbri

2 October 2016 7	Empoli	0–3	Juventus	Empoli
12:30 CEST (UTC+02:00)	Pasqual (yellow card) 62'; Mauri (yellow card) 69'	Report	Hernanes (yellow card) 50'; Dybala 65'; Higuaín 67', 70'	Stadium: Stadio Carlo Castellani; Attendance: 15,424; Referee: Paolo Mazzoleni

16 October 2016 8	Genoa	0–0	Empoli	Genoa
15:00 CEST (UTC+02:00)	Lazović (yellow card) 8' (yellow-red card) 34'	Report	Krunić (yellow card) 40'; Bellusci (yellow card) 49'; Saponara (yellow card) 60'; Tello (yellow card) 90+2'	Stadium: Stadio Luigi Ferraris; Attendance: 19,389; Referee: Luca Pairetto

23 October 2016 9	Empoli	0–0	Chievo	Empoli
15:00 CEST (UTC+02:00)	Bellusci (yellow card) 19'; Mauri (yellow card) 21'; Pucciarelli (yellow card) 70'	Report	Castro (yellow card) 44' (yellow-red card) 80'; Birsa (yellow card) 50'; Rigoni (yellow card) 77'; Gobbi (yellow card) 85'	Stadium: Stadio Carlo Castellani; Attendance: 7,105; Referee: Fabio Maresca

26 October 2016 10	Napoli	2–0	Empoli	Naples
20:45 CEST (UTC+02:00)	Mertens 51', (yellow card) 52'; Chiricheș 81'	Report	Bellusci (yellow card) 38'; Tello (yellow card) 83'	Stadium: Stadio San Paolo; Attendance: 15,912; Referee: Maurizio Mariani

30 October 2016 11	Empoli	0–0	Roma	Empoli
15:00 CET (UTC+01:00)	Veseli (yellow card) 11'; Bellusci (yellow card) 18'; Pasqual (yellow card) 35'; Dioussé (yellow card) 62'; Gilardino (yellow card) 67'; Tello (yellow card) 76'	Report	Manolas (yellow card) 30'; De Rossi (yellow card) 68'; Salah (yellow card) 90+3'	Stadium: Stadio Carlo Castellani; Attendance: 11,671; Referee: Marco Di Bello

6 November 2016 12	Pescara	0–4	Empoli	Pescara
12:30 CET (UTC+01:00)	Caprari (yellow card) 32'; Fornasier (yellow card) 68'	Report	Maccarone 12', 44'; Krunić (yellow card) 16'; Pucciarelli 23'; Saponara 89'; Dioussé (yellow card) 90+2'	Stadium: Stadio Adriatico – Giovanni Cornacchia; Attendance: 12,556; Referee: Daniele Orsato

20 November 2016 13	Empoli	0–4	Fiorentina	Empoli
15:00 CET (UTC+01:00)	Bellusci (yellow card) 39'	Report	Bernardeschi 26', 61'; Tello (yellow card) 35'; Tomović (yellow card) 37'; Iličić 47' (pen.), 67'; Valero (yellow card) 57'	Stadium: Stadio Carlo Castellani; Attendance: 10,769; Referee: Davide Massa

26 November 2016 14	Empoli	1–4	Milan	Empoli
20:45 CET (UTC+01:00)	Saponara 17'; Krunić (yellow card) 37'; Bellusci (yellow card) 89'	Report	Romagnoli (yellow card) 4'; Lapadula 15', 77'; Kucka (yellow card) 31'; Bonaventura (yellow card) 43'; Suso 61'; Costa 64' (o.g.)	Stadium: Stadio Carlo Castellani; Attendance: 12,577; Referee: Gianpaolo Calvarese

4 December 2016 15	Sassuolo	3–0	Empoli	Reggio Emilia
15:00 CET (UTC+01:00)	Pellegrini 22' (pen.); Ricci 36' (pen.); Ragusa (yellow card) 44', (goal) 53'; Magnanelli (yellow card) 68'; Antei (yellow card) 69'; Mazzitelli (yellow card) 81'	Report	Skorupski (yellow card) 22'; Barba (yellow card) 34'; Croce (yellow card) 35'; Krunić (yellow card) 44'; Mauri (yellow card) 61'; Bellusci (yellow card) 66'	Stadium: Mapei Stadium – Città del Tricolore; Attendance: 9,588; Referee: Claudio Gavillucci

11 December 2016 16	Bologna	0–0	Empoli	Bologna
15:00 CET (UTC+01:00)	Krafth (yellow card) 90+3'; Džemaili (yellow card) 90+4'	Report	Costa (yellow card) 67'; Croce (yellow card) 75'; Pasqual (yellow card) 90'; Büchel (yellow card) 90+5'	Stadium: Stadio Renato Dall'Ara; Attendance: 17,598; Referee: Marco Guida

17 December 2016 17	Empoli	2–0	Cagliari	Empoli
15:00 CET (UTC+01:00)	Mchedlidze 8', 72', (yellow card) 65'; Saponara (yellow card) 14'; Costa (yellow card) 35'; Krunić (yellow card) 42'; Marilungo (yellow card) 45+2'; Gilardino (yellow card) 90+1'	Report	Padoin (yellow card) 5'; Melchiorri (yellow card) 43'; Dessena (yellow card) 55'; Farias (yellow card) 57'; Isla (yellow card) 71'; Colombo (red card) 80'	Stadium: Stadio Carlo Castellani; Attendance: 8,352; Referee: Nicola Rizzoli
Note: Roberto Colombo was sent off while a substitute.

20 December 2016 18	Atalanta	2–1	Empoli	Bergamo
20:45 CET (UTC+01:00)	Kurtić (yellow card) 38'; Gómez (yellow card) 53'; Kessié 74'; D'Alessandro 90+4', (yellow card) 90+5'	Report	Büchel (yellow card) 17'; Marilungo (yellow card) 22'; Mchedlidze 51'; Dioussé (yellow card) 82'; Skorupski (yellow card) 90'	Stadium: Stadio Atleti Azzurri d'Italia; Attendance: 13,823; Referee: Michael Fabbri

7 January 2017 19	Empoli	1–0	Palermo	Empoli
18:00 CET (UTC+01:00)	Laurini (yellow card) 57'; Maccarone 78' (pen.)	Report	Morganella (yellow card) 74'; Cionek (yellow card) 77'; Bruno Henrique (yellow card) 90+3'	Stadium: Stadio Carlo Castellani; Attendance: 7,268; Referee: Paolo Valeri

15 January 2017 20	Sampdoria	0–0	Empoli	Genoa
15:00 CET (UTC+01:00)	Palombo (yellow card) 29'; Pereira (yellow card) 38'; Linetty (yellow card) 39'	Report	Ćosić (yellow card) 39'; Dioussé (yellow card) 89'; Mchedlidze (yellow card) 90'	Stadium: Stadio Luigi Ferraris; Attendance: 19,056; Referee: Domenico Celi

22 January 2017 21	Empoli	1–0	Udinese	Empoli
15:00 CET (UTC+01:00)	Bellusci (yellow card) 40'; Pasqual (yellow card) 45'; Costa (yellow card) 48'; Tello (yellow card) 78'; Mchedlidze 82'	Report	Jankto (yellow card) 27'; Hallfreðsson (yellow card) 32'; Samir (yellow card) 64'; Kums (yellow card) 87'	Stadium: Stadio Carlo Castellani; Attendance: 7,164; Referee: Carmine Russo

29 January 2017 22	Crotone	4–1	Empoli	Crotone
15:00 CET (UTC+01:00)	Stoian 24'; Ceccherini (yellow card) 34'; Falcinelli 56', 90+1' (pen.), 90+2', (yellow card) 57'; Rosi (yellow card) 63'	Report	Mchedlidze 39'; Krunić (yellow card) 57'	Stadium: Stadio Ezio Scida; Attendance: 7,486; Referee: Paolo Tagliavento

5 February 2017 23	Empoli	1–1	Torino	Empoli
15:00 CET (UTC+01:00)	Krunić (yellow card) 39'; El Kaddouri (yellow card) 42'; Mchedlidze (yellow card) 43'; Pucciarelli 45+2'; Dioussé (yellow card) 50'; Bellusci (yellow card) 59'; Dimarco (yellow card) 90+3'	Report	Belotti 11'; Valdifiori (yellow card) 33'; Baselli (yellow card) 55'; Iturbe (yellow card) 80'; Obi (yellow card) 86'	Stadium: Stadio Carlo Castellani; Attendance: 7,725; Referee: Marco Di Bello

12 February 2017 24	Internazionale	2–0	Empoli	Milan
15:00 CET (UTC+01:00)	Éder 14'; Kondogbia (yellow card) 45+1'; Candreva 54'	Report	El Kaddouri (yellow card) 41'; Dimarco (yellow card) 49'	Stadium: San Siro; Attendance: 40,868; Referee: Domenico Celi

18 February 2017 25	Empoli	1–2	Lazio	Empoli
20:45 CET (UTC+01:00)	Costa (yellow card) 2'; Krunić 67'; Dioussé (yellow card) 84'; Veseli (yellow card) 90+3'	Report	Biglia (yellow card) 60'; Immobile 68'; Keita 80'	Stadium: Stadio Carlo Castellani; Attendance: 8,743; Referee: Nicola Rizzoli

25 February 2017 26	Juventus	2–0	Empoli	Turin
20:45 CET (UTC+01:00)	Skorupski 52' (o.g.); Alex Sandro 65'	Report	Bellusci (yellow card) 82'	Stadium: Juventus Stadium; Attendance: 39,276; Referee: Maurizio Mariani

5 March 2017 27	Empoli	0–2	Genoa	Empoli
15:00 CET (UTC+01:00)	Bellusci (yellow card) 36'; Maccarone (yellow card) 63'; Dioussé (yellow card) 79'	Report	Rigoni (yellow card) 18'; Pinilla (yellow card) 75'; Ntcham 89'; Hiljemark 90+2'	Stadium: Stadio Carlo Castellani; Attendance: 7,655; Referee: Daniele Doveri

12 March 2017 28	Chievo	4–0	Empoli	Verona
15:00 CET (UTC+01:00)	Inglese 22'; Pellissier 40'; Birsa 75'; Cesar 89'	Report	Dioussé (yellow card) 55'	Stadium: Stadio Marc'Antonio Bentegodi; Attendance: 9,000; Referee: Piero Giacomelli

19 March 2017 29	Empoli	2–3	Napoli	Empoli
12:30 CET (UTC+01:00)	Costa (yellow card) 6'; Dioussé (yellow card) 64'; El Kaddouri 70'; Mauri (yellow card) 75'; Maccarone 82' (pen.)	Report	Insigne 19', 38' (pen.); Mertens 24'; Jorginho (yellow card) 32'; Callejón (yellow card) 69'; Hysaj (yellow card) 79'; Albiol (yellow card) 84'	Stadium: Stadio Carlo Castellani; Attendance: 13,732; Referee: Antonio Damato

1 April 2017 30	Roma	2–0	Empoli	Rome
20:45 CEST (UTC+02:00)	Džeko 12', 56'	Report	Krunić (yellow card) 43'	Stadium: Stadio Olimpico; Attendance: 31,946; Referee: Davide Massa

8 April 2017 31	Empoli	1–1	Pescara	Empoli
15:00 CEST (UTC+02:00)	El Kaddouri 9'; Krunić (yellow card) 26'; Büchel (yellow card) 38'	Report	Campagnaro (yellow card) 6'; Bovo (yellow card) 10'; Caprari 31'; Muntari (yellow card) 54'	Stadium: Stadio Carlo Castellani; Attendance: 7,711; Referee: Paolo Tagliavento

15 April 2017 32	Fiorentina	1–2	Empoli	Florence
15:00 CEST (UTC+02:00)	Tello 64'; Tomović (yellow card) 69'; Iličić (yellow card) 86'; Olivera (yellow card) 90'; Valero (yellow card) 90+4'; Kalinić (red card) 90+5'	Report	Croce (yellow card) 35'; El Kaddouri 37'; Veseli (yellow card) 54'; Krunić (yellow card) 55'; Barba (yellow card) 73'; Dioussé (yellow card) 82'; Pasqual 90+3' (pen.)	Stadium: Stadio Artemio Franchi; Attendance: 26,195; Referee: Paolo Mazzoleni

23 April 2017 33	Milan	1–2	Empoli	Milan
15:00 CEST (UTC+02:00)	Sosa (yellow card) 21'; De Sciglio (yellow card) 48'; Lapadula 72'; Suso (yellow card) 82'	Report	Mchedlidze 40'; Thiam (yellow card) 56', (goal) 67'; Tello (yellow card) 82'; El Kaddouri (yellow card) 89'; Bellusci (yellow card) 90+6'	Stadium: San Siro; Attendance: 39,529; Referee: Claudio Gavillucci

30 April 2017 34	Empoli	1–3	Sassuolo	Empoli
15:00 CEST (UTC+02:00)	Pucciarelli 24' (pen.); Dioussé (yellow card) 65'; Maccarone (yellow card) 81'	Report	Duncan (yellow card) 8', (goal) 57'; Peluso 19'; Matri 34'; Letschert (yellow card) 52'; Sensi (yellow card) 81'	Stadium: Stadio Carlo Castellani; Attendance: 7,484; Referee: Daniele Doveri

7 May 2017 35	Empoli	3–1	Bologna	Empoli
15:00 CEST (UTC+02:00)	Croce 5'; Pasqual 38', (yellow card) 65'; Costa 46'	Report	Verdi 11'; Krejčí (yellow card) 16'; Gastaldello (yellow card) 43'	Stadium: Stadio Carlo Castellani; Attendance: 8,883; Referee: Gianpaolo Calvarese

14 May 2017 36	Cagliari	3–2	Empoli	Cagliari
15:00 CEST (UTC+02:00)	Sau 7'; Farias 17', 45'; Pisacane (yellow card) 40'; Alves (yellow card) 67'	Report	Bellusci (yellow card) 45+1'; El Kaddouri (yellow card) 49'; Zajc 79'; Maccarone 84'	Stadium: Stadio Sant'Elia; Attendance: 12,021; Referee: Maurizio Mariani

21 May 2017 37	Empoli	0–1	Atalanta	Empoli
15:00 CEST (UTC+02:00)	Pasqual (yellow card) 24'; Büchel (yellow card) 29'; El Kaddouri (yellow card) 70'	Report	Gómez 13'; Conti (yellow card) 24'; Masiello (yellow card) 39'	Stadium: Stadio Carlo Castellani; Attendance: 10,233; Referee: Paolo Valeri

28 May 2017 38	Palermo	2–1	Empoli	Palermo
20:45 CEST (UTC+02:00)	Aleesami (yellow card) 11'; Diamanti (yellow card) 69'; Nestorovski 76'; Bruno Henrique 84'; Chochev (yellow card) 90+2'	Report	Bellusci (yellow card) 39'; Dioussé (yellow card) 49'; Laurini (yellow card) 66'; Costa (yellow card) 67'; Krunić 87'	Stadium: Stadio Renzo Barbera; Attendance: 8,559; Referee: Nicola Rizzoli

=== Coppa Italia ===
13 August 2016 Third round	Empoli	2–0	Vicenza	Empoli
20:45 CEST (UTC+02:00)	Maccarone 4' (pen.), 16'	Report		Stadium: Stadio Carlo Castellani; Attendance: 1,386; Referee: Massimiliano Irrati

29 November 2016 Fourth round	Empoli	1–2 (a.e.t.)	Cesena	Empoli
15:00 CET (UTC+01:00)	Tello (yellow card) 58'; Gilardino 79'; Ćosić (yellow card) 115'	Report	Panico 67'; Vitale (yellow card) 90+3'; Rodríguez 102'	Stadium: Stadio Carlo Castellani; Attendance: 644; Referee: Luigi Nasca

== Statistics ==
=== Appearances and goals ===
No.	Pos	Nat	Player	Total		Serie A		Coppa Italia	
No.	Pos	Nat	Player	Apps	Goals	Apps	Goals	Apps	Goals
Goalkeepers
1	GK	(Italy) ITA	Maurizio Pugliesi	0	0	0	0	0	0
23	GK	(Italy) ITA	Alberto Pelagotti	5	0	3	0	2	0
28	GK	(Poland) POL	Łukasz Skorupski	35	0	35	0	0	0
Defenders
2	DF	(France) FRA	Vincent Laurini	25	0	24	0	1	0
3	DF	(Italy) ITA	Marco Zambelli	11	0	4+6	0	1	0
4	DF	(Italy) ITA	Federico Dimarco	13	0	6+6	0	1	0
6	DF	(Italy) ITA	Giuseppe Bellusci	33	1	33	1	0	0
13	DF	(Albania) ALB	Frédéric Veseli	17	0	11+6	0	0	0
15	DF	(Italy) ITA	Andrea Costa	27	2	25+1	2	1	0
19	DF	(Italy) ITA	Federico Barba	12	0	9+2	0	1	0
21	DF	(Italy) ITA	Manuel Pasqual	33	2	32	2	1	0
24	DF	(Serbia) SRB	Uroš Ćosić	16	0	8+6	0	2	0
Midfielders
5	MF	(Italy) ITA	José Mauri	15	0	10+4	0	1	0
8	MF	(Senegal) SEN	Assane Dioussé	35	0	26+7	0	0+2	0
10	MF	(Morocco) MAR	Omar El Kaddouri	15	3	15	3	0	0
11	MF	(Italy) ITA	Daniele Croce	36	1	32+3	1	0+1	0
17	MF	(Slovenia) SLO	Miha Zajc	5	1	1+4	1	0	0
31	MF	(Brazil) BRA	Matheus	2	0	0+1	0	1	0
33	MF	(Bosnia and Herzegovina) BIH	Rade Krunić	33	2	29+3	2	0+1	0
77	MF	(Liechtenstein) LIE	Marcel Büchel	17	0	10+5	0	1+1	0
88	MF	(Colombia) COL	Andrés Tello	20	0	8+10	0	2	0
Forwards
7	FW	(Italy) ITA	Massimo Maccarone	29	7	17+11	5	1	2
9	FW	(Georgia (country)) GEO	Levan Mchedlidze	15	6	11+4	6	0	0
20	FW	(Italy) ITA	Manuel Pucciarelli	33	3	25+7	3	1	0
25	FW	(Austria) AUT	Arnel Jakupovic	1	0	0+1	0	0	0
27	FW	(Senegal) SEN	Mame Baba Thiam	15	1	9+6	1	0	0
89	FW	(Italy) ITA	Guido Marilungo	21	0	11+9	0	1	0
Players transferred out during the season
10	MF	(Italy) ITA	Riccardo Saponara	19	2	18	2	1	0
17	DF	(Italy) ITA	Raffaele Maiello	3	0	1	0	2	0
18	FW	(Italy) ITA	Alberto Gilardino	16	1	5+9	0	1+1	1

Last updated: 28 May 2017
Source: Competitions

=== Goalscorers ===
Rank	No.	Pos	Nat	Name	Serie A	Coppa Italia	Total
1	7	FW	(Italy)	Massimo Maccarone	5	2	7
2	9	FW	(Georgia (country))	Levan Mchedlidze	6	0	6
3	10	MF	(Morocco)	Omar El Kaddouri	3	0	3
3	20	FW	(Italy)	Manuel Pucciarelli	3	0	3
5	10	MF	(Italy)	Riccardo Saponara	2	0	2
5	15	DF	(Italy)	Andrea Costa	2	0	2
5	21	DF	(Italy)	Manuel Pasqual	2	0	2
5	33	MF	(Bosnia and Herzegovina)	Rade Krunić	2	0	2
9	6	DF	(Italy)	Giuseppe Bellusci	1	0	1
9	11	MF	(Italy)	Daniele Croce	1	0	1
9	17	MF	(Slovenia)	Miha Zajc	1	0	1
9	18	FW	(Italy)	Alberto Gilardino	0	1	1
9	27	FW	(Senegal)	Mame Baba Thiam	1	0	1
Own goal					0	0	0
Totals					29	3	32

Last updated: 28 May 2017

=== Clean sheets ===
Rank	No.	Pos	Nat	Name	Serie A	Coppa Italia	Total
1	28	GK	(Poland)	Łukasz Skorupski	10	0	10
2	23	GK	(Italy)	Alberto Pelagotti	0	1	1
Totals					10	1	11

Last updated: 28 May 2017

=== Disciplinary record ===
No.	Pos	Nat	Player	Serie A			Coppa Italia			Total		
No.	Pos	Nat	Player	Booked	(yellow card) (yellow-red card)	Sent off (straight red)	Booked	(yellow card) (yellow-red card)	Sent off (straight red)	Booked	(yellow card) (yellow-red card)	Sent off (straight red)
28	GK	(Poland)	Łukasz Skorupski	2	0	0	0	0	0	2	0	0
2	DF	(France)	Vincent Laurini	2	0	1	0	0	0	2	0	1
3	DF	(Italy)	Marco Zambelli	1	0	0	0	0	0	1	0	0
4	DF	(Italy)	Federico Dimarco	2	0	0	0	0	0	2	0	0
6	DF	(Italy)	Giuseppe Bellusci	15	0	0	0	0	0	15	0	0
13	DF	(Albania)	Frédéric Veseli	3	0	0	0	0	0	3	0	0
15	DF	(Italy)	Andrea Costa	6	0	0	0	0	0	6	0	0
19	DF	(Italy)	Federico Barba	3	0	0	0	0	0	3	0	0
21	DF	(Italy)	Manuel Pasqual	7	0	0	0	0	0	7	0	0
24	DF	(Serbia)	Uroš Ćosić	1	0	0	1	0	0	2	0	0
5	MF	(Italy)	José Mauri	4	0	0	0	0	0	4	0	0
8	MF	(Senegal)	Assane Dioussé	13	0	0	0	0	0	13	0	0
10	MF	(Morocco)	Omar El Kaddouri	5	0	0	0	0	0	5	0	0
10	MF	(Italy)	Riccardo Saponara	4	0	0	0	0	0	4	0	0
11	MF	(Italy)	Daniele Croce	4	0	0	0	0	0	4	0	0
33	MF	(Bosnia and Herzegovina)	Rade Krunić	10	0	0	0	0	0	10	0	0
77	MF	(Liechtenstein)	Marcel Büchel	5	0	0	0	0	0	5	0	0
88	MF	(Colombia)	Andrés Tello	6	0	0	1	0	0	7	0	0
7	FW	(Italy)	Massimo Maccarone	3	0	1	0	0	0	3	0	1
9	FW	(Georgia (country))	Levan Mchedlidze	3	0	0	0	0	0	3	0	0
18	FW	(Italy)	Alberto Gilardino	2	0	0	0	0	0	2	0	0
20	FW	(Italy)	Manuel Pucciarelli	2	0	0	0	0	0	2	0	0
27	FW	(Senegal)	Mame Baba Thiam	1	0	0	0	0	0	1	0	0
89	FW	(Italy)	Guido Marilungo	2	0	0	0	0	0	2	0	0
Totals				106	0	2	2	0	0	108	0	2

Last updated: 28 May 2017
