= Riccardo Saponara =

Italian footballer

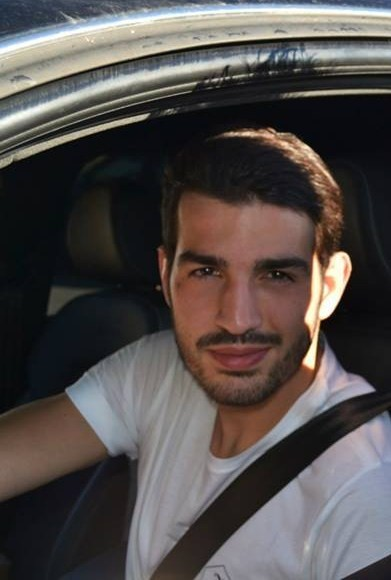
- Saponara in 2013

Personal information
- Date of birth: 21 December 1991 (age 34)
- Place of birth: Forlì, Italy
- Height: 1.84 m (6 ft 0 in)
- Position: Attacking midfielder

Youth career
- 2000–2004: Sammartinese
- 2004–2007: Forlì
- 2007–2009: Ravenna
- 2009–2010: Empoli

Senior career*
Years	Team	Apps	(Gls)
2008–2009	Ravenna	3	(0)
2009–2013	Empoli	83	(12)
2013–2015	AC Milan	8	(0)
2015–2018	Empoli	68	(14)
2017–2018	→ Fiorentina (loan)	29	(2)
2018–2023	Fiorentina	60	(7)
2018–2019	→ Sampdoria (loan)	22	(2)
2019–2020	→ Genoa (loan)	4	(0)
2020	→ Lecce (loan)	13	(2)
2021	→ Spezia (loan)	9	(2)
2023–2024	Hellas Verona	12	(0)
2024–2025	Ankaragücü	21	(2)

International career
2009	Italy U18	3	(0)
2009	Italy U19	1	(0)
2011–2013	Italy U21	22	(3)
Medal record
Men's Football
Representing Italy
UEFA European Under-21 Championship
Second place	2013 Israel
- * Club domestic league appearances and goals as of 22 February 2025

Riccardo Saponara (Italian pronunciation: [rikˈkardo sapoˈnaːra]; born 21 December 1991) is an Italian professional footballer who plays as an attacking midfielder.

== Club career ==
=== Ravenna ===
Born in Forlì to parents from Palazzo San Gervasio, Basilicata, Southern Italy, Saponara started his professional career at Ravenna. In January 2009, he was signed by Empoli in a co-ownership deal for €700,000. In June 2010, Saponara was signed by Empoli outright for another €550,000.

=== Empoli and AC Milan ===
Originally played as a winger, Empoli manager Maurizio Sarri switched him into a central position behind the strikers in the 2012–13 Serie B season to devastating effect as he grabbed 13 goals and 15 assists in 40 appearances for the club. He led Empoli to the Serie B promotion play-off finals where they lost to Livorno.

In January 2013, AC Milan signed the 21-year-old Saponara from Empoli on the condition that he remained at Empoli until the end of the season. Milan paid €3.75 million for his co-ownership on a 4 1/2-year contract, which Parma signed Empoli's half for €2.6 million in summer 2013. He played just 218 minutes of Serie A football spread across seven league games, failing to contribute any goals or assists in the 2013–14 season. In June 2014, Milan acquired Parma's half for just €1 million.

=== Return to Empoli ===
On 16 January 2015, Saponara returned to Empoli with the formula of the loan with the right of redemption. He made his comeback for the club four days later in Roma - Empoli 2–1 in Coppa Italia. He made comeback in the league ten days later in Empoli's 1–2 defeat to Udinese, opening the scoring with a penalty kick; his first goal in Serie A and his second during his experience in Tuscany. On 22 March 2015, he scored his first brace in a 3–1 home win over Sassuolo. On 13 May, his contract was redeemed by Empoli for a reported €4 million.

=== Fiorentina ===
On 28 January 2017, Saponara was loaned to Fiorentina until the end of the season with an obligation to buy him out at the end of the loan deal.

==== Loan to Sampdoria ====
On 17 August 2018, Saponara joined Sampdoria on a one-year loan from Fiorentina. The deal included an option to purchase.

After Saponara scored a game tying goal against Lazio on 18 December 2018, he gained notoriety when he was celebrating with his teams' fans, his shorts fell down and the supporters also pulled down his briefs, which exposed his rear.

==== Loan to Genoa ====
On 7 August 2019, Saponara joined Genoa on loan with an option to buy.

==== Loan to Lecce ====
On 22 January 2020, Saponara joined Lecce on loan from Genoa.

==== Loan to Spezia ====
On 5 January 2021, Saponara joined Spezia on loan from Fiorentina.

=== Ankaragücü ===
In January 2024, Saponara joined Turkish Süper Lig club Ankaragücü on an eighteen-month contract. His contract was terminated on 26 February 2025.

== International career ==
Saponara made his debut with the Italy under-21 national team on 8 February 2011, in a 1–0 win over England. He scored his first goal for the under-21 side on 13 April, in a 2–0 win over Russia. Saponara was chosen by former manager Ciro Ferrara to take part in the Toulon Tournament in May 2011, where he appeared in all of Italy's matches, helping the team to win a Bronze medal. He was also elected to take part at the 2013 UEFA European Under-21 Championship with Italy, under manager Devis Mangia, and he scored a goal in Italy's second group match against hosts Israel, in a 4–0 win, which qualified the Italians for the semi-final. Saponara made three appearances throughout the tournament, helping Italy to reach the final, where they were defeated 4–2 by Spain. Overall, between 2011 and 2013, he has collected 22 appearances, scoring three goals for the "azzurrini".

== Style of play ==
Saponara primarily played as an attacking midfielder in a creative role, but was also capable of playing on the wing (preferably on the right flank) or as a central midfielder in the mezzala role. Several pundits identified his main qualities in his prime as his speed, physical power, defensive work-rate, and technique, as well as his eye for goal from midfield, in addition to his link-up play, attacking movement, and dribbling ability. His style of play and performances as a youngster during his time in Serie B drew occasional comparisons to Brazilian fellow playmaker Kaká, who was one of his influences. At the conclusion of the 2020–21 Serie A season, Saponara held the record for the fastest sprint in the league clocked at 36.04 km/h. Although he was considered to be a talented player in his youth in the media, several pundits, such as Fabrizio Salvio of La Gazzetta dello Sport, believe that his timid character and his struggles with injuries prevented him from fulfilling his potential.

== Career statistics ==
As of 30 January 2024

Appearances and goals by club, season and competition
Club	Season	League			Cup		Other		Total	
Club	Season	Division	Apps	Goals	Apps	Goals	Apps	Goals	Apps	Goals
Ravenna	2008–09	Lega Pro Prima Divisione	3	0	4 (Note: One appearance in Coppa Italia, three appearances in Coppa Italia Lega Pro)	0	—		7	0
Empoli	2010–11	Serie B	17	0	0	0	—		18	0
Empoli	2011–12	Serie B	30	1	3	0	2 (Note: Appearances in Serie B – Relegation play-out)	0	35	1
Empoli	2012–13	Serie B	36	11	0	0	4 (Note: Appearances in Serie B – Promotion play-offs)	2	40	13
Empoli	Total		83	12	3	0	6	2	92	14
AC Milan	2013–14	Serie A	7	0	0	0	—		7	0
AC Milan	2014–15	Serie A	1	0	—		—		1	0
AC Milan	Total		8	0	0	0	—		8	0
Empoli	2014–15	Serie A	17	7	1	0	—		18	7
Empoli	2015–16	Serie A	33	5	1	0	—		34	5
Empoli	2016–17	Serie A	18	2	1	0	—		19	2
Empoli	Total		68	14	3	0	—		71	14
Fiorentina (loan)	2016–17	Serie A	11	2	—		0	0	11	2
Fiorentina (loan)	2017–18	Serie A	18	0	2	0	—		20	0
Fiorentina	2020–21	Serie A	2	0	1	0	—		3	0
Fiorentina	2021–22	Serie A	29	3	5	0	—		34	3
Fiorentina	2022–23	Serie A	29	4	0	0	10 (Note: Appearances in UEFA Conference League)	2	39	6
Fiorentina	Total		89	9	8	0	10	2	107	11
Sampdoria (loan)	2018–19	Serie A	22	2	2	0	—		24	2
Genoa (loan)	2019–20	Serie A	4	0	1	1	—		5	1
Lecce (loan)	2019–20	Serie A	13	2	—		—		13	2
Spezia (loan)	2020–21	Serie A	9	2	1	2	—		10	4
Hellas Verona	2023–24	Serie A	12	0	2	0	—		14	0
Career total			311	41	24	3	16	4	351	48

== Honours ==
Fiorentina

- Coppa Italia runner-up: 2022–23
- UEFA Europa Conference League runner-up: 2022–23

Italy U21

- UEFA European Under-21 Championship runner-up: 2013
