= Alberto Pelagotti =

Italian footballer (born 1989)

Personal information
- Date of birth: 9 March 1989 (age 37)
- Place of birth: Empoli, Italy
- Height: 1.86 m (6 ft 1 in)
- Position: Goalkeeper

Youth career
- –2008: Empoli

Senior career*
| Years | Team | Apps | (Gls) |
| 2008–2017 | Empoli | 58 | (0) |
| 2008–2009 | → Manfredonia (loan) | 34 | (0) |
| 2014–2015 | → Pisa (loan) | 36 | (0) |
| 2017–2018 | Brescia | 0 | (0) |
| 2018–2019 | Arezzo | 37 | (0) |
| 2019–2022 | Palermo | 91 | (0) |
| 2023 | Novara | 3 | (0) |
| Total | | 259 | (0) |

International career
| 2007 | Italy U-19 | 1 | (0) |
- * Club domestic league appearances and goals as of 9 April 2022

Alberto Pelagotti (born 9 March 1989) is an Italian former footballer who plays as a goalkeeper.

== Career ==
Pelagotti started his career with hometown club Empoli, with whom he played at Serie A and Serie B level from 2009 to 2017. After two short stints at Brescia and Arezzo, in 2019 he moved down to Serie D to join Palermo following the club refoundation; with the Rosanero, he won two promotions from Serie D to Serie B before leaving the club for good on 30 June 2022, by the end of his contract. He also had to miss a number of games during the 2021–22 after being forced to undergo surgery for a neurofibroma.

After a few months without a club, on 4 February 2023 he joined Serie C club Novara until the end of the 2022–23 season.

== Career statistics ==
Appearances and goals by club, season and competition
| Club | Season | League | | | National cup | | Other | | Total | |
| Club | Season | Division | Apps | Goals | Apps | Goals | Apps | Goals | Apps | Goals |
|---|---|---|---|---|---|---|---|---|---|---|
| Empoli | 2009–10 | Serie B | 2 | 0 | 1 | 0 | — | | 3 | 0 |
| Empoli | 2010–11 | Serie B | 16 | 0 | 1 | 0 | — | | 17 | 0 |
| Empoli | 2011–12 | Serie B | 28 | 0 | 1 | 0 | 0 | 0 | 29 | 0 |
| Empoli | 2012–13 | Serie B | 3 | 0 | 0 | 0 | 0 | 0 | 3 | 0 |
| Empoli | 2013–14 | Serie B | 0 | 0 | 0 | 0 | — | | 0 | 0 |
| Empoli | 2015–16 | Serie A | 6 | 0 | 0 | 0 | — | | 6 | 0 |
| Empoli | 2016–17 | Serie A | 3 | 0 | 2 | 0 | — | | 5 | 0 |
| Empoli | Total | | 58 | 0 | 5 | 0 | 0 | 0 | 63 | 0 |
| Manfredonia (loan) | 2008–09 | Lega Pro 2 D | 34 | 0 | 2 | 0 | 2 (Note: All appearance(s) in relegation play-outs.) | 0 | 38 | 0 |
| Pisa (loan) | 2014–15 | Lega Pro | 36 | 0 | 3 | 0 | — | | 39 | 0 |
| Brescia | 2017–18 | Serie B | 0 | 0 | 0 | 0 | — | | 0 | 0 |
| Arezzo | 2018–19 | Serie C | 37 | 0 | 0 | 0 | 5 (Note: All appearance(s) in promotion play-offs.) | 0 | 42 | 0 |
| Palermo | 2019–20 | Serie D | 25 | 0 | 0 | 0 | — | | 25 | 0 |
| Palermo | 2020–21 | Serie C | 36 | 0 | — | | 4 | 0 | 40 | 0 |
| Palermo | 2021–22 | Serie C | 30 | 0 | 1 | 0 | 0 | 0 | 31 | 0 |
| Palermo | Total | | 91 | 0 | 1 | 0 | 4 | 0 | 96 | 0 |
| Novara | 2022–23 | Serie C | 3 | 0 | 0 | 0 | 0 | 0 | 3 | 0 |
| Career total | | | 259 | 0 | 11 | 0 | 11 | 0 | 281 | 0 |
