= Carlo Castellani =

Italian footballer (1909–1944)

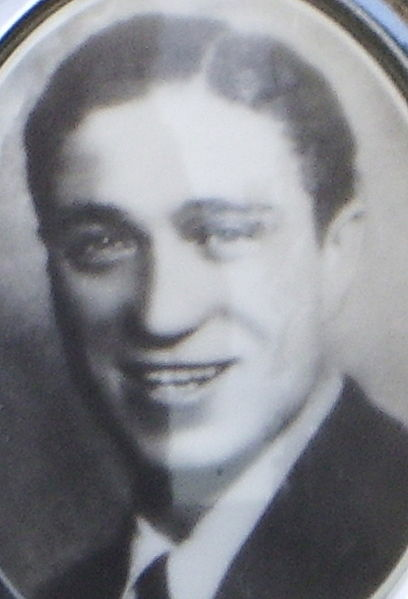

Personal information
- Date of birth: 15 January 1909
- Place of birth: Fibbiana, Montelupo Fiorentino, Italy
- Date of death: 11 August 1944 (aged 35)
- Place of death: Mauthausen-Gusen, Austria
- Position: Striker

Senior career*
Years	Team	Apps	(Gls)
1926–1930	Empoli		
1930–1933	Livorno		
1933–1934	Viareggio Calcio		
1934–1939	Empoli		
- * Club domestic league appearances and goals

Carlo Castellani (15 January 1909 – 11 August 1944) was an Italian footballer who played as a striker for Empoli, Livorno and Viareggio Calcio. He was deported to Gusen concentration camp in early 1944 in place of his anti-fascist father, and died there on 11 August 1944, aged 35.

== Life and career ==
Castellani was born on 15 January 1909 in Fibbiana, Montelupo Fiorentino. He started his footballing career at Empoli, making his Terza Divisione debut on 7 November 1926, and helped the club to promotion to the Seconda Divisione that season. He stayed at the club until 1930, when he joined Livorno in Serie A. He scored 3 in 25 games in the 1930–31 season as Livorno were relegated to Serie B. He transferred to Viareggio Calcio in 1933 before returning to Empoli in 1934. In total, he scored 61 goals in 145 matches for Empoli across his two spells at the club, making him their highest scoring player until 2011, when he was overtaken by Francesco Tavano. He retired from football in 1940 and continued to live in his birth town of Fibbiana, where he owned a sawmill. He continued to support Empoli financially after his retirement as a player.

Castellani's father was a socialist and vocal critic of Benito Mussolini and fascism and as a result, following strikes at a nearby glass factory, the occupying German forces looked to arrest his father. As his father was ill at the time, Castellani volunteered to go in his father's place in the belief that he would be sent to a nearby barracks where he could explain the situation. Castellani was instead taken to the railway station in Florence from where he was deported to Mauthausen concentration camp. He was transferred to Gusen concentration camp, where he died of dysentery on 11 August 1944.

In 1965, Empoli named their newly-built stadium Stadio Carlo Castellani in memory of Castellani.
