= Łukasz Skorupski =

Polish footballer (born 1991)

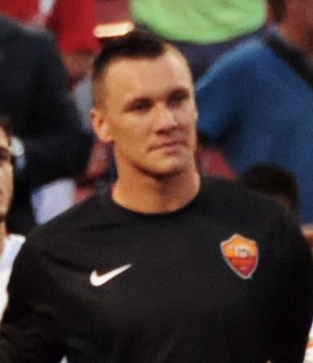
- Skorupski with Roma in 2014

Personal information
- Full name: Łukasz Skorupski
- Date of birth: 5 May 1991 (age 35)
- Place of birth: Zabrze, Poland
- Height: 1.88 m (6 ft 2 in)
- Position: Goalkeeper

Team information
- Current team: Bologna
- Number: 1

Youth career
- 1998–2003: Pogoń Zabrze
- 2003–2008: Górnik Zabrze

Senior career*
Years	Team	Apps	(Gls)
2008–2013	Górnik Zabrze	56	(0)
2010–2011	→ Ruch Radzionków (loan)	14	(0)
2013–2018	Roma	6	(0)
2015–2017	→ Empoli (loan)	66	(0)
2018–	Bologna	261	(0)

International career^{‡}
2011	Poland U20	3	(0)
2011–2012	Poland U21	5	(0)
2012–	Poland	20	(0)
- * Club domestic league appearances and goals as of 20:03, 28 October 2026 (UTC) ‡ National team caps and goals as of 21:37, 12 October 2025 (UTC)

Łukasz Skorupski (born 5 May 1991) is a Polish professional footballer who plays as a goalkeeper for Serie A club Bologna and the Poland national team.

== Club career ==
=== Early career ===
Born in Zabrze, Skorupski started his professional career with Górnik Zabrze. In February 2011, he was loaned to Ruch Radzionków. He returned to Górnik half year later.

=== Roma and loan to Empoli ===
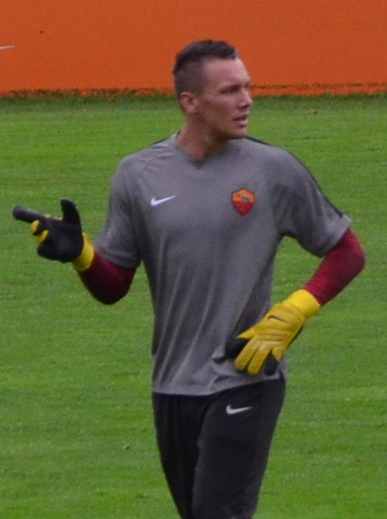
Skorupski training with Roma in 2014

On 14 July 2013, Skorupski joined Italian Serie A club Roma, signing a four-year contract. Skorupski made his debut for Roma in the 1–0 Coppa Italia victory over Sampdoria on 9 January 2014. Skorupski's league debut came against Juventus, a 0–1 loss in the penultimate game of the season, he also played against Genoa the following, a defeat by the same scoreline.

On 30 September 2014, Skorupski made his European debut in the 1–1 Champions League draw against Manchester City.

On 30 August 2015, Skorupski was loaned out for two seasons to Empoli. He made 66 league appearances for Empoli.

On 20 July 2016, Skorupski signed a new five-year contract.

In the summer of 2017, Skorupski returned to Roma.

=== Bologna ===
On 22 June 2018, Roma confirmed they had sold Skorupski to Bologna for a reported fee of around €9 million.

== International career ==
Skorupski was a part of Poland under-20 and under-21 squad. He made his senior national team debut against Macedonia played in Aksu in an international friendly match on 14 December 2012. In May 2018, Skorupski was named in Poland's preliminary 35-man squad for the 2018 FIFA World Cup in Russia. However, he did not make the final 23.

On 3 June 2021, Skorupski was selected in Poland's final 25-man squad for UEFA Euro 2020 as a third-choice goalkeeper behind Wojciech Szczęsny and Łukasz Fabiański.

On 10 November 2022, Skorupski was included in the 26-man squad for the 2022 FIFA World Cup as back-up for Szczęsny.

On 7 June 2024, he made the final roster for UEFA Euro 2024, again as a backup goalkeeper. On 25 June, Skorupski made his first appearance in an international tournament after being named in the starting line-up for Poland's final group stage game against France. After stopping seven attempts on goal and conceding once from a penalty kick, he was named Man of the Match by UEFA.

== Personal life ==
On 14 June 2017, Skorupski married Italian Matilde Rossi. On 1 June 2018, his son Leonardo was born. Skorupski's brother, Michał, is also a footballer.

== Career statistics ==
=== Club ===
As of match played 28 October 2026

Appearances and goals by club, season and competition
Club	Season	League			National cup (Note: Includes Polish Cup, Coppa Italia)		Europe		Other		Total	
Club	Season	Division	Apps	Goals	Apps	Goals	Apps	Goals	Apps	Goals	Apps	Goals
Ruch Radzionków (loan)	2010–11	I liga	14	0	—		—		—		14	0
Górnik Zabrze	2011–12	Ekstraklasa	27	0	0	0	—		—		27	0
Górnik Zabrze	2012–13	Ekstraklasa	29	0	1	0	—		—		30	0
Górnik Zabrze	Total		56	0	1	0	—		—		57	0
Roma	2013–14	Serie A	2	0	1	0	—		—		3	0
Roma	2014–15	Serie A	3	0	2	0	6 (Note: Two appearances in UEFA Champions League, four appearances in UEFA Europa League)	0	—		11	0
Roma	2017–18	Serie A	1	0	1	0	0	0	—		2	0
Roma	Total		6	0	4	0	6	0	—		16	0
Empoli (loan)	2015–16	Serie A	31	0	1	0	—		—		32	0
Empoli (loan)	2016–17	Serie A	35	0	0	0	—		—		35	0
Empoli (loan)	Total		66	0	1	0	—		—		67	0
Bologna	2018–19	Serie A	38	0	1	0	—		—		39	0
Bologna	2019–20	Serie A	37	0	1	0	—		—		38	0
Bologna	2020–21	Serie A	28	0	0	0	—		—		28	0
Bologna	2021–22	Serie A	36	0	1	0	—		—		37	0
Bologna	2022–23	Serie A	37	0	2	0	—		—		39	0
Bologna	2023–24	Serie A	32	0	2	0	—		—		34	0
Bologna	2024–25	Serie A	27	0	3	0	7 (Note: Appearances in UEFA Champions League)	0	—		37	0
Bologna	2025–26	Serie A	19	0	1	0	9 (Note: Appearances in UEFA Europa League)	0	0	0	29	0
Bologna	2026–27	Serie A	7	0	0	0	—		—		7	0
Bologna	Total		261	0	11	0	16	0	0	0	288	0
Career total			403	0	17	0	22	0	0	0	442	0

=== International ===
As of match played 12 October 2025

Appearances and goals by national team and year
National team	Year	Apps	Goals
Poland	2012	1	0
Poland	2018	2	0
Poland	2020	1	0
Poland	2021	1	0
Poland	2022	3	0
Poland	2023	1	0
Poland	2024	5	0
Poland	2025	6	0
Total		20	0

== Honours ==
Bologna

- Coppa Italia: 2024–25
