= Marcel Büchel =

Liechtensteiner footballer

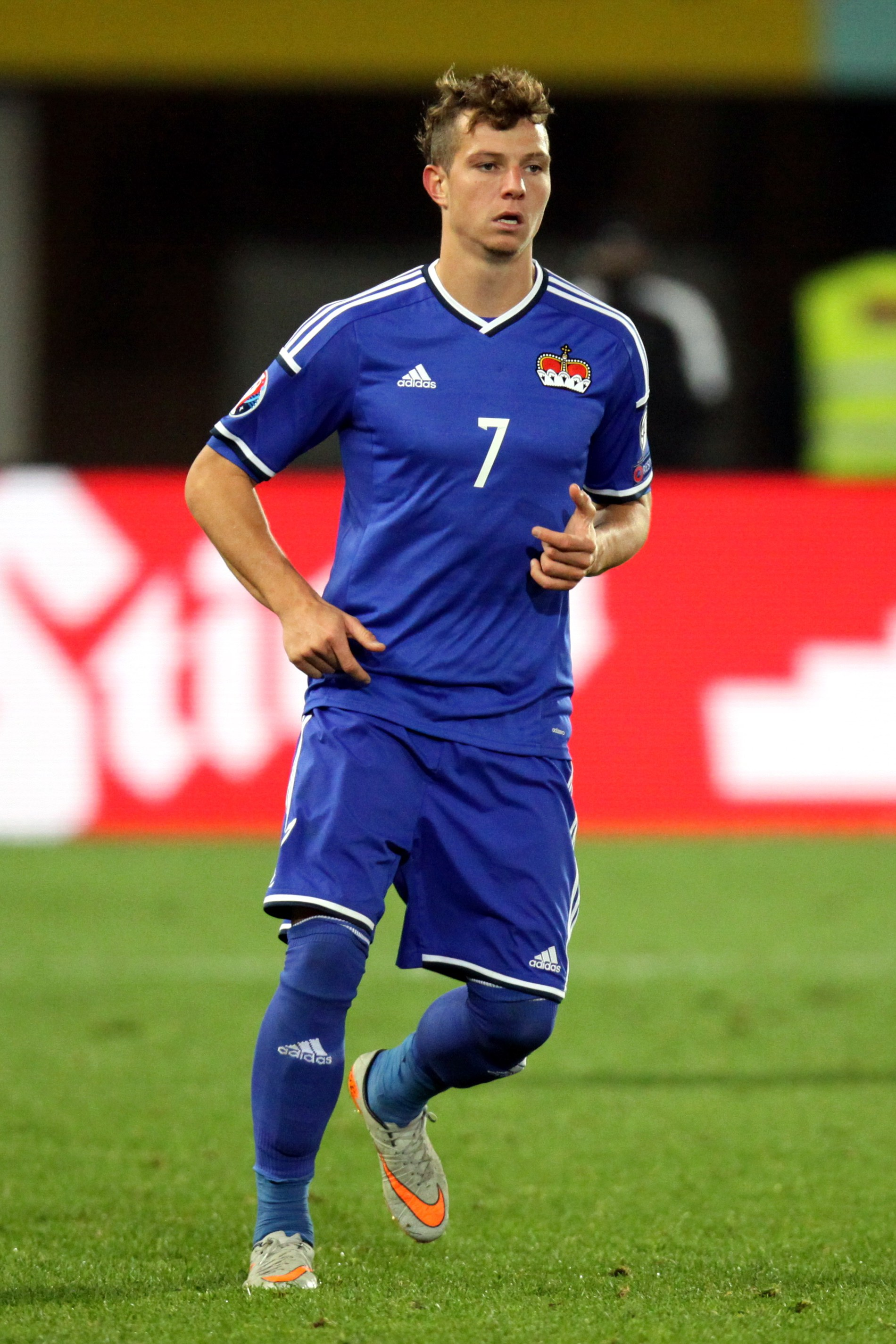
- Büchel playing for Liechtenstein in 2016

Personal information
- Date of birth: 18 March 1991 (age 35)
- Place of birth: Feldkirch, Austria
- Height: 1.75 m (5 ft 9 in)
- Position: Midfielder

Team information
- Current team: UniPomezia 1938
- Number: 4

Youth career
- 2005–2009: St. Gallen
- 2009–2010: Siena

Senior career*
Years	Team	Apps	(Gls)
2008	St. Gallen II	1	(0)
2010–2013	Siena	0	(0)
2010–2011	→ Juventus (loan)	0	(0)
2011–2012	→ Gubbio (loan)	17	(1)
2012–2013	→ Cremonese (loan)	24	(0)
2013–2016	Juventus	0	(0)
2013–2014	→ Virtus Lanciano (loan)	33	(1)
2014–2015	→ Bologna (loan)	30	(3)
2015–2016	→ Empoli (loan)	28	(2)
2016–2019	Empoli	15	(0)
2017–2018	→ Verona (loan)	23	(0)
2019–2020	Juve Stabia	7	(0)
2020–2023	Ascoli	87	(3)
2024–2025	SPAL	30	(1)
2025	Messina	11	(0)
2025	L'Aquila	11	(0)
2025–	UniPomezia 1938	16	(1)

International career^{‡}
2009	Austria U19	3	(0)
2015–	Liechtenstein	36	(1)
- * Club domestic league appearances and goals as of 6 June 2026 ‡ National team caps and goals as of 16 November 2026

Marcel Büchel (born 18 March 1991) is a professional footballer who plays as a midfielder for Serie D club UniPomezia 1938. Born in Austria, he represents Liechtenstein at international level.

== Club career ==
=== Early career ===
Born in Feldkirch, Austria, Büchel began his career with the youth teams of Swiss club FC St. Gallen and Italian club Siena. Büchel signed a season-long loan deal with Juventus for the 2010–11 season, and made his professional debut for Juventus in the 2010–11 UEFA Europa League, in a group stage match against Austrian team Red Bull Salzburg on 4 November 2010.

On 1 July 2011, Büchel was sent out on loan to Serie B side Gubbio on a season-long deal. He finished the 2011–12 Serie B campaign having made 17 league appearances for the club, and scoring 1 goal. Büchel spent the next season out on loan to Cremonese.

=== Juventus ===
On 31 January 2013, it was officially communicated that Büchel was sold to former club Juventus in a co-ownership deal. In exchange, Siena also signed Juventus' Primavera captain Andrea Schiavone, also on a co-ownership deal. As part of the negotiations, Büchel's loan spell at Cremonese would continue. He was called up to the Juventus first team by head coach Antonio Conte, as part of a 31-man squad for their pre-season training camp in Valle d'Aosta on 11 July 2013.

On 2 September 2013, Büchel was officially loaned out to Virtus Lanciano on a season-long deal, that expired on 30 June 2014

On 26 August 2014, Büchel was officially loaned out to Bologna on a season-long deal, that expired 30 June 2015.

=== Empoli ===
On 31 August 2015, he was loaned out to Empoli.

On 22 June 2016, Empoli bought Büchel's contract outright from Juventus, for €1.5 million transfer fee.

=== Hellas Verona ===
Büchel signed with Hellas Verona in August 2017 on loan with a purchase option.

=== Juve Stabia ===
After being released by Empoli at the end of the 2018–19 season, Büchel had an unsuccessful trial with Serie A team Roma.

On 4 November 2019 it was announced that Büchel had joined Juve Stabia of Serie B, wearing the number 50 shirt.

He made his debut for Juve Stabia in a 2–0 defeat to Virtus Entella, playing for 76 minutes before being subbed off for Massimiliano Carlini.

=== Ascoli ===
On 16 September 2020 he signed a one-year contract with Ascoli with an option to renew.

On 22 September 2023, Büchel's contract was terminated by mutual consent.

=== SPAL ===
On 11 January 2024, Büchel signed a contract with SPAL in Serie C until 30 June 2025.

=== Messina ===
On 21 January 2025, SPAL announced Büchel's transfer to Messina in Serie C.

== International career ==
On 18 September 2015, it was announced that Büchel had acquired Liechtensteiner citizenship and was named in their squad for the upcoming UEFA Euro 2016 qualifiers in October.

== Career statistics ==
=== Club ===
As of match played 13 May 2022

Appearances and goals by club, season and competition
Club	Season	League			National Cup		Continental		Total	
Club	Season	Division	Apps	Goals	Apps	Goals	Apps	Goals	Apps	Goals
Siena	2009–10	Serie A	0	0	0	0	–		0	0
Juventus (loan)	2010–11	Serie A	0	0	0	0	2	0	0	0
Gubbio (loan)	2011–12	Serie B	17	1	2	0	–		19	1
Cremonese (loan)	2012–13	Lega Pro Prima Divisione	24	0	0	0	–		24	0
Virtus Lanciano (loan)	2013–14	Serie B	33	1	0	0	–		33	1
Bologna (loan)	2014–15	Serie B	30	3	0	0	–		30	3
Empoli (loan)	2015–16	Serie A	28	2	0	0	–		28	2
Empoli	2016–17	Serie A	15	0	2	0	–		17	0
Verona (loan)	2017–18	Serie A	23	0	1	0	–		24	0
Juve Stabia (loan)	2019–20	Serie B	7	0	0	0	–		7	0
Ascoli (loan)	2020–21	Serie B	27	1	0	0	–		27	1
Ascoli (loan)	2021–22	Serie B	31	1	1	0	–		32	1
Ascoli (loan)	Total		29	1	1	0	0	0	30	1
Career Total			206	8	6	0	2	0	214	8

=== International ===
As of match played 16 November 2026

Appearances and goals by national team and year
National team	Year	Apps	Goals
Liechtenstein	2015	2	0
Liechtenstein	2016	6	1
Liechtenstein	2017	3	0
Liechtenstein	2018	3	0
Liechtenstein	2019	2	0
Liechtenstein	2020	1	0
Liechtenstein	2021	0	0
Liechtenstein	2022	0	0
Liechtenstein	2023	4	0
Liechtenstein	2024	8	0
Liechtenstein	2025	0	0
Liechtenstein	2026	7	0
Total		36	1

Scores and results list Liechtenstein's goal tally first.

List of international goals scored by Marcel Büchel
#	Date	Venue	Opponent	Score	Result	Competition
1.	19 November 2018	Rheinpark Stadion, Vaduz, Liechtenstein	Armenia	1–1	2–2	2018–19 UEFA Nations League D
