= Massimo Maccarone =

Italian football manager (born 1979)

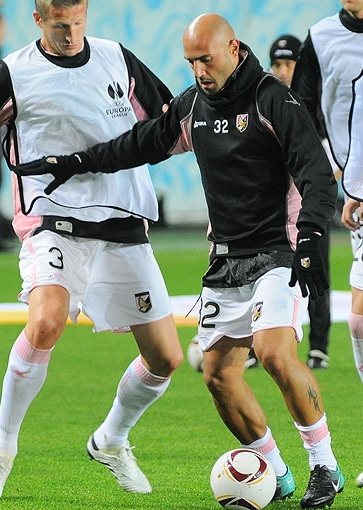
- Maccarone training with Palermo in 2010

Personal information
- Full name: Massimo Maccarone
- Date of birth: 6 September 1979 (age 47)
- Place of birth: Galliate, Italy
- Height: 1.80 m (5 ft 11 in)
- Position: Striker

Youth career
- 1987–1988: Oleggio
- 1988–1993: GS Soccer Boys
- 1993–1998: AC Milan

Senior career*
Years	Team	Apps	(Gls)
1998–2000	AC Milan	0	(0)
1998	→ Modena (loan)	0	(0)
1998–1999	→ Prato (loan)	21	(4)
1999	→ Varese (loan)	3	(0)
1999–2000	Prato	28	(20)
2000–2002	Empoli	68	(36)
2002–2007	Middlesbrough	80	(18)
2004–2005	→ Parma (loan)	7	(0)
2005	→ Siena (loan)	17	(7)
2007–2010	Siena	113	(40)
2010–2011	Palermo	18	(2)
2011–2014	Sampdoria	38	(6)
2012–2014	→ Empoli (loan)	105	(40)
2014–2017	Empoli	99	(28)
2017–2018	Brisbane Roar	28	(9)
2018–2020	Carrarese	57	(9)
Total		682	(219)

International career
1995	Italy U15	2	(1)
1995–1996	Italy U16	4	(1)
1998–1999	Italy U20	5	(3)
2000–2002	Italy U21	15	(11)
2002	Italy	2	(0)

Managerial career
- 2022–2023: Ghiviborgo
- 2023: Piacenza
- * Club domestic league appearances and goals

Massimo Maccarone (Italian pronunciation: [ˈmassimo makkaˈroːne]; born 6 September 1979) is an Italian football coach and former player, who played as a striker. He was nicknamed Big Mac during his playing days.

== Club career ==
=== Early career ===
Maccarone grew up playing with friends in Oleggio, in the Province of Novara. He was spotted in the final of the "Fortina e Zanolli" youth tournament at the age of eight (Pulcini category).

At nine, he joined Soccer Boys Turbigo and, at thirteen, was recruited by AC Milan, spending five seasons in the club's academy. He also appeared at the Torneo di Viareggio in 1998. After featuring in pre-season friendlies under Fabio Capello, he spent the summer of 1998 on loan at Modena, where he failed to make an appearance, before moving to Prato in Serie C2 in September 1998. He scored on his debut on 4 October 1998 in a 2–0 win over Cremapergo and finished the season with 21 league appearances and four goals; in the play-offs he converted two penalties against Mantova in the semi-finals, before Prato lost the final.

He began the following season with Varese but returned to Prato on 27 September 1999. He scored 20 goals in 28 league matches to finish as Serie C2's top scorer. Prato reached the promotion play-off final but lost 3–2 to Alessandria on 11 June 2000; Maccarone scored Prato's first goal in the match.

In 2000, Maccarone returned to Milan and transferred to Empoli, helping the club get promoted to Serie A during the 2001–02 season. In the same period, he was one of the most outstanding players of the Italy U21 team which reached the semi-finals in the 2002 UEFA European Under-21 Football Championship. As a result, he was noticed by several teams.

=== Middlesbrough ===
Maccarone was signed by English Premier League team Middlesbrough on 9 July 2002 for £8.15 million (€12.7 million). He made his debut against Southampton on 17 August 2002. On his second appearance, and his home debut the following week, he scored twice in a 2–2 draw with Fulham. Another highlight in his first season was scoring twice as Middlesbrough defeated Tottenham Hotspur 5–1.

Maccarone was an unused substitute when Middlesbrough won the 2004 Football League Cup Final. Despite showing fine early form in his first few matches for Middlesbrough, the remainder of his spell at the club was a struggle to justify his price tag and, during the first half of the 2004–05 season, he was loaned out to Serie A club Parma, and again in January 2005 to Siena.

Maccarone returned to Middlesbrough for the 2005–06 season and, despite not being a regular first-team player, endeared himself to the Middlesbrough fans, especially through his work-rate and attitude. The player's spell at Middlesbrough is remembered for two last-minute winners in key UEFA Cup ties in 2006. He scored against Basel in the second leg of the quarter-finals, a tie in which Middlesbrough overturned a three-goal deficit to win 4–3 on aggregate. In the semi-final of the same competition he came on as a substitute and scored twice in the aggregate 4–3 win over Steaua Bucharest, scoring one of Middlesbrough's most iconic goals of all time, once again in the 90th minute, taking Boro to the final in Eindhoven, in which he came on as a substitute. Following his exploits in the semi-final, fellow Middlesbrough striker Jimmy Floyd Hasselbaink declared: "Massimo, I love him until I die... it's unbelievable".

=== Siena ===
Despite these heroics, he made few appearances for Middlesbrough in the following season and in January 2007, Maccarone moved to Siena in a free transfer, signing a three-year contract. In February 2007, he made headlines by criticising former Middlesbrough and then-England manager Steve McClaren for his "ineptitude", causing his club's chairman Steve Gibson to call Maccarone "a fool".

On 11 February 2007, he played his first Serie A match after his Siena return, against Cagliari. Maccarone scored a brace in the 4–3 defeat against A.C. Milan on 17 February, to register his first goals for Siena. He finished the season with six goals, and added 13 in the following (club best by a long margin), as Siena achieved two consecutive 13th league places. After the club was relegated at the end of the 2009–10 season, Maccarone agreed a move to Sicilian Serie A club Palermo, signing a three-year deal with the rosanero, for €4.5 million.

=== Later career ===
On 24 January 2011, Maccarone signed for Sampdoria for €2.7 million on a 2 1/2-year contract.

From January 2012 to June 2014, Maccarone returned to Empoli in temporary deals. His contract was also extended to 30 June 2015 in 2012. On 17 July 2014, he was allowed to join Empoli on a free transfer.

On 17 July 2017, Maccarone signed a one-year marquee deal with A-League club Brisbane Roar.

On 25 May 2018, he was signed by Italian Serie C team Carrarese.

== International career ==
During his time at Empoli, Maccarone made his debut with the Italy Under-21 side under Marco Tardelli. He later earned a place as a starting striker in Claudio Gentile's Italy Under-21 side between 2000 and 2002. In total, he scored 11 goals with the Under-21 side in 15 appearances, and he took part at the 2002 Under-21 European Championship with Italy, where he finished as the tournament's top scorer, with 3 goals, helping Italy to reach the semi-finals, where they lost out to the eventual champions, the Czech Republic. During the group stage, he scored two goals in a 2–1 win against the England Under-21 side in Basel.

In 2002, he played twice for the Italy senior side. He made his senior international debut on 27 March, in a friendly match against England in Leeds; he came on as a late substitute, with the score level at 1–1. In injury time, Maccarone was fouled in the area by the English goalkeeper David James, allowing Vincenzo Montella to score the winning goal from the penalty spot. Maccarone had scored a goal in a 1–1 friendly draw in Bradford against the England Under-21 side earlier that week. It had been over seventy years that a Serie B player had made his debut with the Italy national side before making his Serie A debut. He made his second and final appearance for the Italian senior side on 16 October 2002, in a 2–1 away defeat against Wales in a European Championship qualifying match.

== Style of play ==
Maccarone predominantly played as a striker, although he was also capable of being deployed as a supporting forward or as a winger, where he was able to move into the center of the pitch and curl shots towards goal with his stronger foot, due to his striking ability from distance, and his eye for goal. Maccarone was capable of shooting with either foot, and he possessed good tactical intelligence, pace, and technique, as well as a strong mentality and good composure in front of goal; however, he was effective in the air.

== Coaching career ==
Following his retirement, he stayed on at Carrarese as a technical collaborator under his former boss Silvio Baldini for the 2020–21 season, leaving in April 2021 following the appointment of Antonio Di Natale as the club's new head coach.

In June 2022, Maccarone took on his first role as head coach, accepting a job offer from Tuscan Serie D amateurs Ghiviborgo. After a single season at Ghiviborgo, Maccarone was named new head coach of Serie D fallen giants Piacenza; he was, however, dismissed from his coaching post just a few months later, on 12 November 2023, following a negative start to the club's league campaign.

== Career statistics ==
=== Club ===
As of 28 March 2019

Club	League	Season	League		Cup		Continental		Total	
Club	League	Season	Apps	Goals	Apps	Goals	Apps	Goals	Apps	Goals
Prato (loan)	Serie C2	1998–99	21	4	?	?	0	0	?	?
Varese (loan)	Serie C1	1999–00	3	0	?	?	0	0	?	?
Prato	Serie C2	1999–00	28	20	?	?	0	0	?	?
Empoli	Serie B	2000–01	35	16	3	2	0	0	38	18
Empoli	Serie B	2001–02	33	10	4	2	0	0	37	12
Empoli	Total		68	26	7	4	0	0	75	30
Middlesbrough	Premier League	2002–03	34	9	0	0	0	0	34	9
Middlesbrough	Premier League	2003–04	22	6	8	2	0	0	30	8
Middlesbrough	Premier League	2004–05	0	0	0	0	0	0	0	0
Middlesbrough	Premier League	2005–06	17	2	5	0	5	5	27	7
Middlesbrough	Premier League	2006–07	7	1	1	0	0	0	8	1
Middlesbrough	Total		80	18	14	2	5	5	99	25
Parma (loan)	Serie A	2004–05	7	0	1	0	4	2	12	2
Siena (loan)	Serie A	2004–05	17	7	1	1	0	0	18	8
Siena	Serie A	2006–07	11	6	0	0	0	0	11	6
Siena	Serie A	2007–08	35	13	0	0	0	0	35	13
Siena	Serie A	2008–09	30	9	0	0	0	0	30	9
Siena	Serie A	2009–10	37	12	0	0	0	0	37	12
Siena	Total		130	47	1	1	0	0	131	48
Palermo	Serie A	2010–11	18	2	0	0	8	4	26	6
Sampdoria	Serie A	2010–11	17	3	1	0	0	0	18	3
Sampdoria	Serie B	2011–12	11	3	1	1	0	0	12	4
Sampdoria	Total		28	6	2	1	0	0	30	7
Empoli	Serie B	2011–12	20	7	0	0	0	0	20	7
Empoli	Serie B	2012–13	43	18	0	0	0	0	43	18
Empoli	Serie B	2013–14	42	15	2	1	0	0	44	16
Empoli	Serie A	2014–15	34	10	1	0	0	0	35	10
Empoli	Serie A	2015–16	37	13	1	0	0	0	38	13
Empoli	Serie A	2016–17	28	5	1	2	0	0	29	7
Empoli	Total		204	68	5	3	0	0	209	71
Empoli	Empoli Total		272	94	12	7	0	0	284	101
Brisbane Roar	A-League	2017–18	28	9	1	0	1	1	30	10
Carrarese	Serie C	2017–18	32	7	1	0	0	0	33	7
Career total			647	207	32*	11*	14	10	693*	228*

=== Managerial ===
As of 1 November 2023

Managerial record by team and tenure
Team	Nat	From	To	Record							
Team	Nat	From	To	G	W	D	L	GF	GA	GD	Win %
Ghiviborgo	(Italy)	1 July 2022	27 June 2023	35	9	16	10	41	43	−2	25.71
Piacenza	(Italy)	4 July 2023	1 November 2023	12	5	1	6	17	16	+1	41.67
Total				47	14	17	16	58	59	−1	29.79

== Honours ==
Middlesbrough

- Football League Cup: 2003–04
- UEFA Cup runner-up: 2005–06

Individual

- UEFA European Under-21 Championship Top-scorer: 2002
