= Federico Barba =

Italian footballer

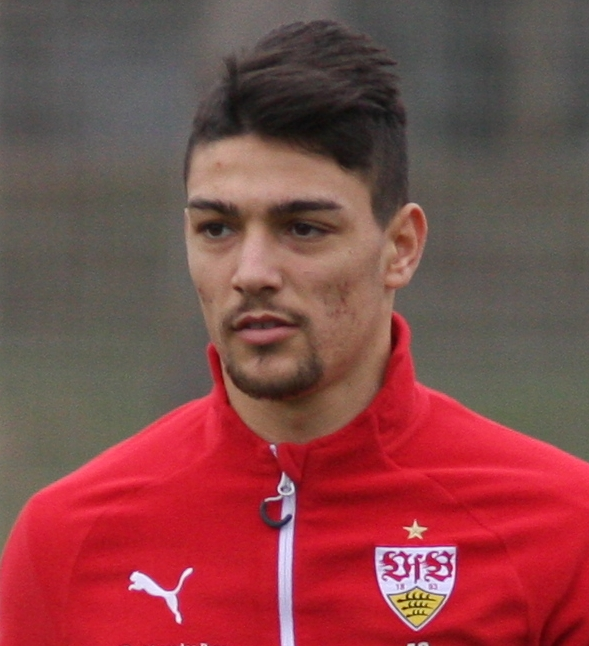
- Barba with VfB Stuttgart in 2016

Personal information
- Date of birth: 1 September 1993 (age 33)
- Place of birth: Rome, Italy
- Height: 1.88 m (6 ft 2 in)
- Position: Centre-back

Team information
- Current team: Palermo
- Number: 93

Youth career
- 1999–2007: Axa
- 2007–2008: Cisco Roma
- 2008–2012: Roma

Senior career*
Years	Team	Apps	(Gls)
2012–2013	Grosseto	19	(0)
2013–2017	Empoli	53	(2)
2016	→ VfB Stuttgart (loan)	2	(1)
2017–2018	Sporting Gijón	38	(1)
2018–2020	Chievo	30	(0)
2019–2020	→ Valladolid (loan)	5	(0)
2020	→ Benevento (loan)	14	(1)
2020–2022	Benevento	65	(0)
2022–2023	Pisa	30	(1)
2023–2025	Como	39	(3)
2025	Sion	16	(0)
2025–2026	Persib Bandung	27	(5)
2026–	Palermo	1	(0)

International career
2011–2012	Italy U19	6	(0)
2012–2014	Italy U20	9	(1)
2015	Italy U21	2	(0)
- * Club domestic league appearances and goals as of 19 May 2026

Federico Barba (born 1 September 1993) is an Italian professional footballer who plays as a centre-back for Serie B club Palermo.

== Club career ==
=== Early career ===
Born in Rome, Italy, Barba was a six-year-old boy when began to play for AS Axa. Playing as a left or central defender, in 2007 he was sold to Cisco Roma (formerly Lodigiani), the third most popular soccer team in Rome, and at the age of 15 he was transferred to AS Roma where he played in the youth teams, coached, at first, by Andrea Stramaccioni and then by Alberto De Rossi. Barba won U17 national championship with Roma in 2010.; U20 "Primavera" reserve league in 2011 and Coppa Italia Primavera in 2012. In 2012, Federico Barba got the Italian award as the best young defender.

=== Grosseto ===
In July 2012 he was loaned to Serie B club Grosseto, partially due to the age restriction of Primavera had changed to U19 and partially by Barba had ready for professional league. Barba made his debut as starting defender in 2012–13 Coppa Italia. In 2012–13 Serie B, Barba made successive appearances since from 20 October 2012, becoming the regular central defender of Grosseto team. In June 2013, Grosseto acquired half of the registration rights of Barba for €200,000. However, Roma re-acquired Barba for €350,000 and re-sold him to Empoli.

=== Empoli ===
In August 2013, Barba was acquired by Empoli for €250,000 in another co-ownership deal. In June 2015 Empoli acquired the remain 50% registration rights from Roma for an undisclosed fee. He also has scored 2 goals for the club.

=== VfB Stuttgart ===
On 1 February 2016, Barba was loaned out to VfB Stuttgart until the end of the season with an option of purchase.

=== Sporting Gijón ===
In July 2017, Barba was acquired by Spanish club Sporting de Gijón for a reported €1 million fee.

=== ChievoVerona ===
On 14 August 2018, Barba signed with Serie A side ChievoVerona.

==== Valladolid (loan) ====
On 6 July 2019, he returned to Spain after agreeing to a one-year loan deal with La Liga side Real Valladolid.

=== Benevento ===
On 24 January 2020, Barba joined Serie B team Benevento on loan until 30 June 2020. Benevento held an obligation to purchase his rights at the end of the loan term. Barba signed a 3.5-year contract with Benevento with an additional one-year extension option.

=== Pisa ===
On 2 September 2022, Barba signed a three-season contract with Pisa.

=== Como ===
On 2 August 2023, Barba joined Como on a three-year deal.

=== Sion ===
On 16 January 2025, Barba moved to Sion in Switzerland on a two-and-a-half-year deal.

=== Persib Bandung ===
On 27 August 2025, Barba joined Indonesia Super League two-time defending champions, Persib Bandung. Barba won his first-ever championship after Persib Bandung drew against Persijap Jepara on the last day of the season, securing the club's third title in a row. For his contribution throughout the season, Barba was included in the Best XI of the Season.

=== Palermo ===
On 29 July 2026, Barba joined Palermo after the expiry of his contract with Persib Bandung.

== International career ==
Barba made his debut in the third match of 2012 UEFA European Under-19 Football Championship qualification. In the elite qualification, he played twice as the holder of number 2 shirt. He played the first game after Rodrigo Ely was sent off, which Barba substituted forward Mattia Valoti. Due to Ely suspension, Barba played the second match but not the third match.

Barba received an under-20 call-up from Luigi Di Biagio in summer 2012. In November, he received call-up from Devis Mangia for Italy under-21 against Spain. However, he did not play that match.

== Career statistics ==
As of match played 9 March 2026

Appearances and goals by club, season and competition
Club	Season	League			National cup		Other		Total	
Club	Season	Division	Apps	Goals	Apps	Goals	Apps	Goals	Apps	Goals
Grosseto	2012–13	Serie B	19	0	1	0	—		20	0
Grosseto	2013–14	Serie B	—		2	0	—		2	0
Grosseto	Total		19	0	3	0	—		22	0
Empoli	2013–14	Serie B	14	0	—		—		14	0
Empoli	2014–15	Serie A	18	2	2	0	—		20	2
Empoli	2015–16	Serie A	10	0	1	0	—		11	0
Empoli	2016–17	Serie A	11	0	1	0	—		12	0
Empoli	Total		53	2	4	0	0	0	57	0
Stuttgart (loan)	2015–16	Bundesliga	2	1	0	0	0	0	2	1
Sporting Gijón	2017–18	Segunda División	38	1	1	0	2 (Note: Appearance(s) in Promotion Playoffs)	0	41	1
Chievo	2018–19	Serie A	30	0	0	0	—		30	0
Valladolid (loan)	2019–20	La Liga	5	0	0	0	—		5	0
Benevento (loan)	2019–20	Serie B	14	1	0	0	—		14	1
Benevento	2020–21	Serie A	32	0	0	0	—		32	0
Benevento	2021–22	Serie B	30	3	0	0	3 (Note: Appearance(s) in Serie B play-offs)	0	33	3
Benevento	2022–23	Serie B	3	0	0	0	—		3	0
Benevento	Total		65	3	0	0	3	0	68	3
Pisa	2022–23	Serie B	30	1	0	0	—		30	1
Como	2023–24	Serie B	32	3	1	0	—		33	3
Como	2024–25	Serie A	7	0	1	0	—		8	0
Como	Total		39	3	2	0	—		41	3
Sion	2024–25	Swiss Super League	16	0	0	0	—		16	0
Persib Bandung	2025–26	Super League	19	3	—		7 (Note: Appearances in AFC Champions League Two)	0	26	3
Career total			330	15	10	0	12	0	351	15

== Honours ==
Benevento

- Serie B: 2019–20

Persib Bandung

- Super League: 2025–26

Individual

- Super League Best XI: 2025–26
- Super League Assist of the Month: April 2026
- APPI Indonesian Football Award Best XI: 2025–26
- APPI Indonesian Football Award Best Defender: 2025–2026
- APPI Indonesian Football Award Fans Favourite Footballer: 2025–26
