= Manuel Pucciarelli =

Italian footballer (born 1991)

Personal information
- Date of birth: 17 June 1991 (age 35)
- Place of birth: Montemurlo, Italy
- Height: 1.74 m (5 ft 9 in)
- Positions: Second striker; attacking midfielder

Team information
- Current team: Vis Pesaro
- Number: 7

Youth career
- 1997–2001: Jolly Montemurlo
- 2001–2011: Empoli

Senior career*
Years	Team	Apps	(Gls)
2011–2019	Empoli	164	(21)
2012	→ Gavorrano (loan)	17	(10)
2017–2019	→ Chievo (loan)	32	(2)
2019–2021	Chievo	9	(2)
2020	→ Pescara (loan)	9	(1)
2021	→ Dibba Al Fujairah (loan)	12	(3)
2021–2022	Melbourne City	3	(0)
2022–	Vis Pesaro	125	(9)
- * Club domestic league appearances and goals as of 30 April 2026

Manuel Pucciarelli (born 17 June 1991) is an Italian professional footballer who plays as a second striker or attacking midfielder for Serie C Group B club Vis Pesaro.

== Career ==
Pucciarelli first began playing football in Jolly Montemurlo's youth sector. At 10 years old, he moved to Empoli; he played for their youth team in the 2009–10 Campionato Primavera final, scoring a goal in a 2–1 defeat to Genoa.

On 29 May 2011, Pucciarelli made his first-team debut in a 1–1 draw against Vicenza, replacing Mirko Valdifiori in the 60th minute. On 22 January 2012, he moved on loan to Lega Pro Seconda Divisione side Gavorrano, scoring 10 goals (including a brace against L'Aquila) in 17 appearances.

After his promotion to the Serie A with Empoli, Pucciarelli made his top flight debut against Udinese on 31 August 2014, replacing Levan Mchedlidze in the 83rd minute. He scored his first Serie A goal on 23 September against AC Milan.

On 11 July 2017, Pucciarelli was sent on a two-year loan to Chievo, with obligation for purchase.

On 31 January 2020, Pucciarelli joined Pescara on loan until the end of the 2019–20 season.

On 20 January 2021, Pucciarelli was loaned to Dibba Al-Furjarah in the UAE First Division League.

In September 2021, Pucciarelli joined Australian club Melbourne City on a two-year deal.

On 22 November 2022, Pucciarelli signed for Serie C club Vis Pesaro as a free transfer, agreeing a contract until the end of the season with an option to extend.

== Style of play ==
Pucciarelli is a second striker, who can also play as an attacking midfielder. He is good at creating attacking opportunities for his teammates, and is known for his endurance and pressing the opposing ball carrier.
