= Andrea Costa (footballer) =

Italian footballer (born 1986)

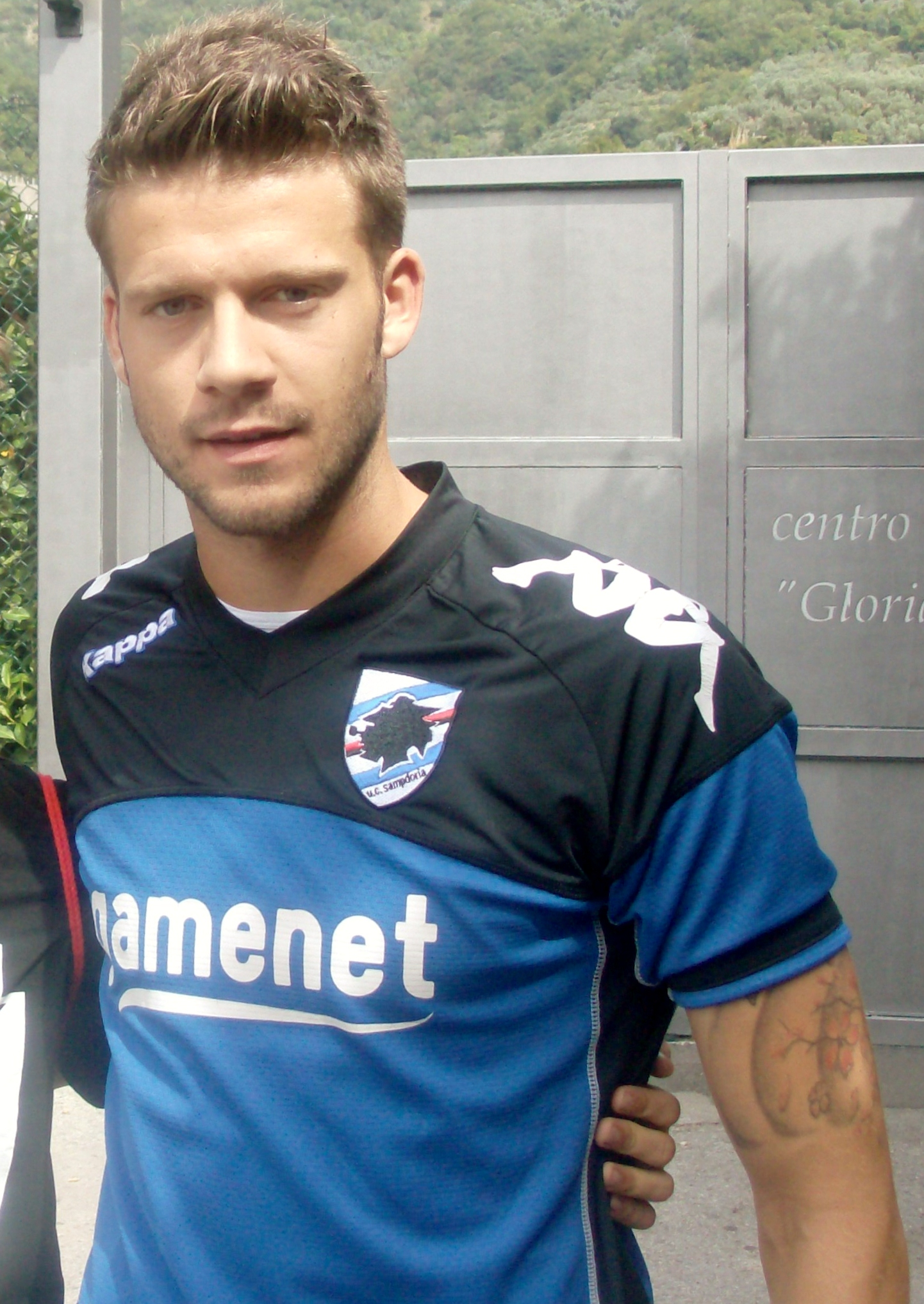

Personal information
- Date of birth: 1 February 1986 (age 40)
- Place of birth: Reggio Emilia, Italy
- Height: 1.82 m (6 ft 0 in)
- Positions: Left back; centre-back; left winger

Team information
- Current team: Reggiana (U17 coach)

Youth career
- Reggiana

Senior career*
Years	Team	Apps	(Gls)
2003–2008	Bologna	43	(0)
2003–2005	→ Reggiana (loan)	16	(1)
2008–2011	Reggina	85	(1)
2011–2014	Sampdoria	72	(2)
2014–2015	Parma	22	(1)
2015–2017	Empoli	50	(3)
2017–2019	Benevento	21	(0)
2019–2021	Reggiana	29	(1)

International career
2003–2004	Italy U-18	7	(0)
2004–2005	Italy U-19	11	(1)
2005–2006	Italy U-20	2	(0)

Managerial career
- 2021–: Reggiana (U17)
- * Club domestic league appearances and goals

Andrea Costa (born 1 February 1986) is an Italian football coach and a former player who played as a defender or midfielder. He is the coach of Under-17 squad of Reggiana.

== Club career ==
=== Reggiana ===
Costa started his career at hometown club Reggiana of Serie C1.

=== Bologna ===
He was signed by Bologna in summer 2003 in co-ownership deal, but reported to squad in January 2005, which he already made 16 appearances for Reggiana.

After Bologna relegated in summer 2005, he entered the first team and played 43 Serie B games. Bologna also acquired Costa outright from bankrupted Reggiana in the same summer.

=== Reggina ===
On 31 January 2008, he was signed by Serie A team Reggina, located in Reggio Calabria, for €100,000 loan fee. In June 2008, Reggina bought him outright for an additional €2.75 million transfer fee.

=== Sampdoria ===
On 3 August 2011 he was signed by U.C. Sampdoria on a temporary basis for a loan fee of €1.9 million. On 3 July 2012 he was signed in a definitive deal for another €1.1 million on a 4-year contract.

=== Parma ===
On 27 August 2014 Costa joined Parma with Marco Marchionni moved to opposite direction. Both players were valued for €2 million fee. Costa became a free agent in June 2015, after the bankruptcy of the club.

=== Empoli ===
Costa signed a three-year contract with Empoli on 21 July 2015. He left Empoli after the club relegated at the last round of 2016–17 Serie A season.

=== Benevento ===
On 13 July 2017, he agreed to join newly promoted Benevento from Empoli on a two-year contract.

=== Reggio Audace ===
On 27 August 2019, he joined Serie C club Reggio Audace on a 3-year contract.
