= Marco Zambelli =

Italian footballer (born 1985)

Personal information
- Date of birth: 22 August 1985 (age 41)
- Place of birth: Gavardo, Italy
- Height: 1.80 m (5 ft 11 in)
- Position: Defender

Youth career
- 2000–2004: Brescia

Senior career*
Years	Team	Apps	(Gls)
2004–2015	Brescia	277	(8)
2015–2017	Empoli	29	(0)
2018–2019	Foggia	32	(1)
2019–2020	Feralpisalò	18	(0)

International career
2005–2006	Italy U21	1	(0)
- * Club domestic league appearances and goals as of 16 February 2020

Marco Zambelli (born 22 August 1985) is an Italian former footballer who played as a defender.

== Club career ==
A native of Gavardo, Province of Brescia, Zambelli has spent most of his career at Brescia Calcio. He played his first Serie A match on 26 September 2004, made him received call-up from Italy U20 and Italy U21.

On 5 August 2019, he signed with Feralpisalò.
