= Uroš Ćosić =

Serbian footballer

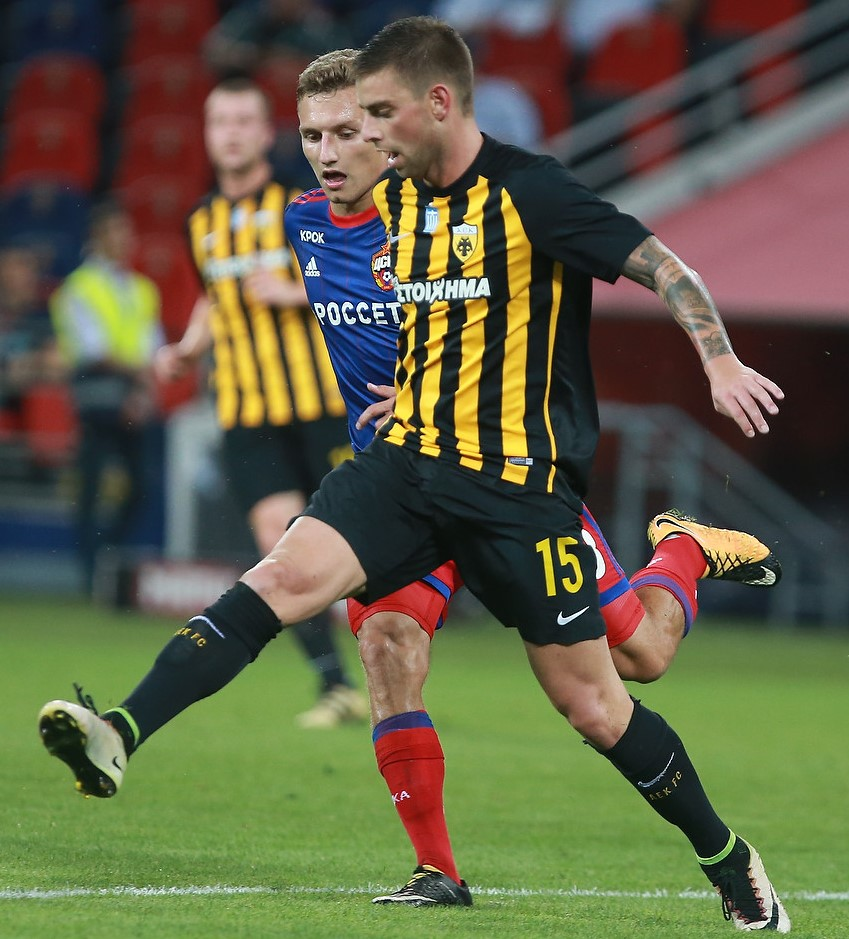
- Ćosić playing for AEK Athens in 2017

Personal information
- Date of birth: 24 October 1992 (age 34)
- Place of birth: Belgrade, FR Yugoslavia
- Height: 1.88 m (6 ft 2 in)
- Position: Centre-back

Team information
- Current team: Glyfada

Youth career
- Red Star Belgrade

Senior career*
| Years | Team | Apps | (Gls) |
| 2009–2013 | CSKA Moscow | 0 | (0) |
| 2011–2012 | → Red Star Belgrade (loan) | 15 | (1) |
| 2012–2013 | → Pescara (loan) | 20 | (0) |
| 2013–2015 | Pescara | 25 | (0) |
| 2015 | → Frosinone (loan) | 11 | (0) |
| 2015–2017 | Empoli | 23 | (0) |
| 2017–2019 | AEK Athens | 28 | (0) |
| 2019–2020 | Universitatea Craiova | 17 | (1) |
| 2020 | Shakhtyor Soligorsk | 0 | (0) |
| 2021 | AEL | 10 | (0) |
| 2021–2022 | PAEEK | 12 | (0) |
| 2022–2024 | IMT | 27 | (0) |
| 2025– | A.O. Glyfada | 0 | (0) |

International career
| 2009–2011 | Serbia U19 | 9 | (0) |
| 2013–2014 | Serbia U21 | 3 | (0) |
- * Club domestic league appearances and goals as of 30 May 2024

Uroš Ćosić (Serbian Cyrillic: Урош Ћосић; born 24 October 1992) is a Serbian professional footballer who plays as a centre-back for Glyfada.

== Club career ==
Uroš Ćosić was born on 24 October 1992 in Belgrade and he made his first steps in football at the youth academies of Red Star Belgrade. At the age of 17, he transferred to CSKA Moscow and then he moved back to Red Star on loan. In 2013, he moved to Pescara. During his spell at the Italian club, he also had a loan transfer to Frosinone. In the 2016–17 season, Ćosic was playing for Italian Serie A club Empoli.

=== AEK Athens ===
On 2 July 2017, AEK Athens and Empoli have reached an agreement for the transfer move of the Serbian central defender to the Super League Greece club. The 25-year-old player made 14 performances during 2016–17 season at Serie A with the struggling Italian team, was expected in Athens in order to complete the final details of deal and sign his four-season contract with AEK. On 3 July 2017, after successfully passing his medicals he put pen to paper to a three (plus one) years' contract. AEK Athens paid €500,000 to acquire Ćosić from Empoli, which has a resale rate of 25%.

On 2 August 2017, Ćosić made his official debut in a 1–0 away defeat against CSKA Moscow for the second leg of the Champions League third qualifying round. On 24 September 2017, he was sent-off, after an altercation with Bjorn Engels in a dramatic 3–2 home win against Olympiacos. Five days later, both players were suspended with a two-match ban. In mid-November, Ćosić faced an ankle problem that kept him out of action for 2–3 weeks. At the end of February 2018, Ćosić had to undergo surgery on his stomach muscles and initial estimations showed that he would miss the rest of 2017–18 season.

=== Universitatea Craiova ===
On 2 September 2019, Ćosić signed a contract with Liga I side Universitatea Craiova for three years, with an option for another year.

== International career ==
Ćosić has already played for the Serbia U-19 team and has been selected in early 2011 for the Serbia U-21 team.

== Career statistics ==
As of 1 June 2019

Appearances and goals by club, season and competition
| Club | Season | League | | | National cup (Note: Includes Serbian Cup, Coppa Italia, Greek Cup) | | Continental | | Other | | Total | |
| Club | Season | Division | Apps | Goals | Apps | Goals | Apps | Goals | Apps | Goals | Apps | Goals |
|---|---|---|---|---|---|---|---|---|---|---|---|---|
| Red Star Belgrade (loan) | 2010–11 | Serbian SuperLiga | 8 | 1 | 2 | 0 | — | | — | | 10 | 1 |
| Red Star Belgrade (loan) | 2011–12 | Serbian SuperLiga | 7 | 0 | 2 | 0 | 2 (Note: Appearances in UEFA Europa League) | 0 | — | | 11 | 0 |
| Red Star Belgrade (loan) | Total | | 15 | 1 | 4 | 0 | 2 | 0 | — | | 21 | 1 |
| Pescara (loan) | 2012–13 | Serie A | 20 | 0 | 1 | 0 | — | | — | | 21 | 0 |
| Pescara | 2013–14 | Serie B | 13 | 0 | 1 | 0 | — | | — | | 14 | 0 |
| Pescara | 2014–15 | Serie B | 12 | 0 | 2 | 0 | — | | — | | 14 | 0 |
| Pescara | Total | | 25 | 0 | 3 | 0 | — | | — | | 28 | 0 |
| Frosinone (loan) | 2014–15 | Serie B | 11 | 0 | 0 | 0 | — | | — | | 11 | 0 |
| Empoli | 2015–16 | Serie A | 9 | 0 | 0 | 0 | — | | — | | 9 | 0 |
| Empoli | 2016–17 | Serie A | 14 | 0 | 2 | 0 | — | | — | | 16 | 0 |
| Empoli | Total | | 23 | 0 | 2 | 0 | — | | — | | 25 | 0 |
| AEK Athens | 2017–18 | Super League Greece | 9 | 0 | 2 | 0 | 6 (Note: One appearance in UEFA Champions League, five appearances in UEFA Europa League) | 0 | — | | 17 | 0 |
| AEK Athens | 2018–19 | Super League Greece | 19 | 0 | 6 | 0 | 6 (Note: Appearances in UEFA Champions League) | 0 | — | | 31 | 0 |
| AEK Athens | Total | | 28 | 0 | 8 | 0 | 12 | 0 | — | | 48 | 0 |
| Career total | | | 122 | 1 | 18 | 0 | 14 | 0 | 0 | 0 | 154 | 1 |

== Honours ==
Red Star Belgrade

- Serbian Cup: 2011–12

AEK Athens

- Super League Greece: 2017–18
