= Daniele Croce =

Italian footballer (born 1982)

Personal information
- Full name: Daniele Croce
- Date of birth: 9 September 1982 (age 44)
- Place of birth: Giulianova, Italy
- Height: 1.75 m (5 ft 9 in)
- Position: Midfielder

Youth career
- –2000: Pescara

Senior career*
Years	Team	Apps	(Gls)
2000–2006	Pescara	111	(11)
2003–2004	→ Taranto (loan)	26	(0)
2006–2010	Arezzo	91	(10)
2007–2008	→ Cesena (loan)	26	(3)
2010–2011	Alessandria	27	(1)
2011–2012	Sorrento	22	(2)
2012–2017	Empoli	168	(5)
2017–2019	Cremonese	45	(2)
- * Club domestic league appearances and goals as of 11 May 2019

Daniele Croce (born 9 September 1982) is an Italian former footballer who played as a central midfielder.

== Club career ==
=== Pescara ===
Born in Giulianova, Abruzzo, Croce started his career at Abruzzese club Pescara.

=== Arezzo ===
Croce was signed by fellow Serie B club Arezzo in a co-ownership deal for €600,000 on 30 August 2006.

In June 2007, Arezzo signed Croce outright for another €431,000. Arezzo folded in 2010.

=== Alessandria & Sorrento ===
In 2010, Croce joined Alessandria. In 2011, he was signed by Sorrento.

=== Empoli ===
In 2012, he returned to Serie B with Empoli F.C.. The club was promoted back to Serie A in 2014. On 24 May 2016, he signed a new 1-year contract with the club.

=== Cremonese ===
After Empoli relegated in 2017, Croce joined Serie B club Cremonese on a free transfer.
