= Stadio Carlo Castellani =

Multi-purpose stadium in Empoli, Italy

Coordinates: 43°43′35″N 10°57′18″E

Stadio Carlo Castellani - Computer Gross Arena
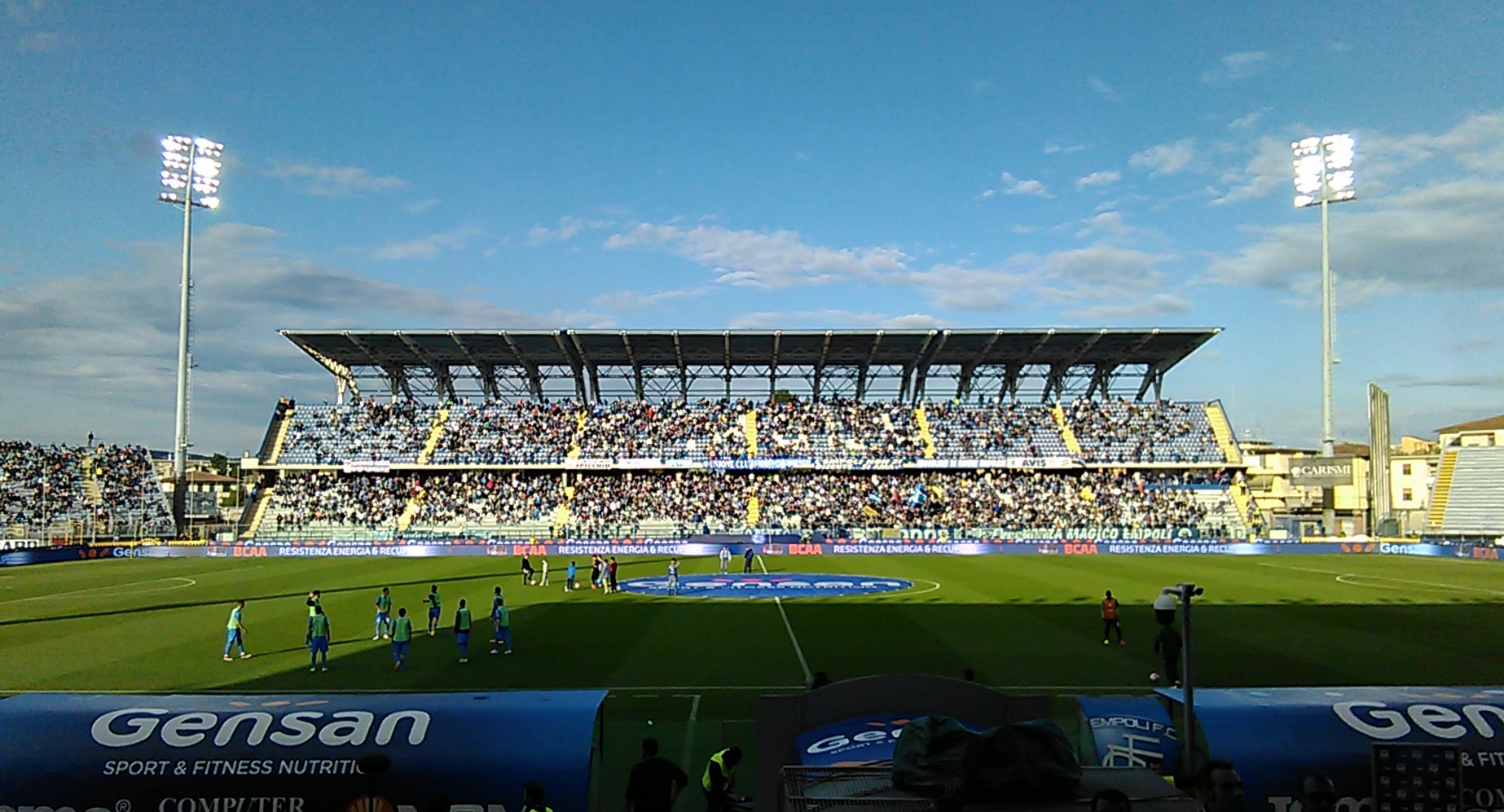
- Interactive map of Stadio Carlo Castellani - Computer Gross Arena
- Address: Via della Maratona
- Location: Empoli, Italy
- Owner: Municipality of Empoli
- Capacity: 16,284
- Surface: Grass; 105x68m

Construction
- Opened: 12 September 1965

Tenants
- Empoli FC (1965–present); Italy national football team (selected matches)

The Stadio comunale Carlo Castellani is a multi-purpose stadium in Empoli, Italy. It is currently used mostly for football matches and the home of Empoli FC. The stadium holds 16,284.

Built in 1923, the Stadio Carlo Castellani is currently the home of Empoli.

The stadium is located in the sporting district of Empoli on the viale delle Olimpiadi.

Inaugurated on 12 September 1965 the ground was dedicated to Carlo Castellani, former football player born in nearby Montelupo Fiorentino, who died prematurely after being deported to the concentration camp of Gusen (Mauthausen).

It is formed by two tribune, or grandstands, and two curve with a total capacity of 16,284 spectators}. The Curva Sud was recently renovated, with older structures being replaced. The Municipality of Empoli and the Banca di Cambiano have financed the renovations. The stadium is also equipped with an athletics track for long jump and a running track.

== See also ==
- List of football stadiums in Italy
- Lists of stadiums
