= Levan Mchedlidze =

Georgian footballer

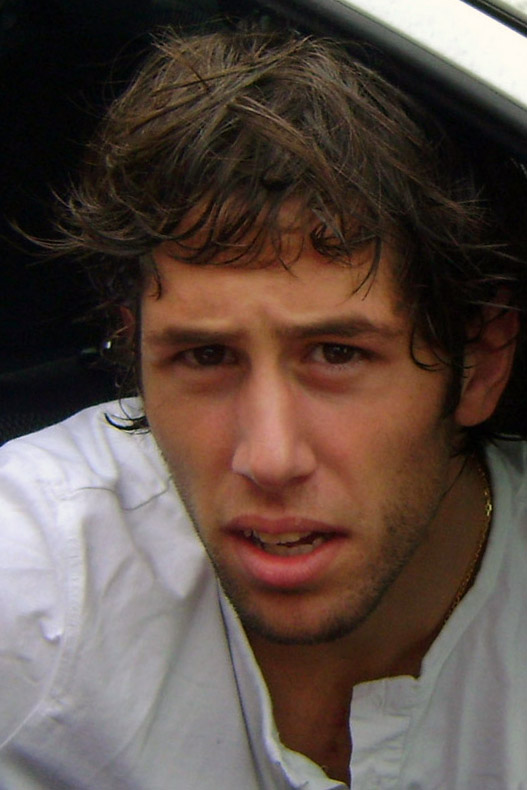
- Mchedlidze in 2008

Personal information
- Date of birth: 24 March 1990 (age 36)
- Place of birth: Tbilisi, Georgia
- Height: 1.92 m (6 ft 4 in)
- Position: Striker

Youth career
- 2005–2006: Dila Gori
- 2006–2008: Empoli

Senior career*
Years	Team	Apps	(Gls)
2005–2006	Dila Gori	2	(0)
2008–2019	Empoli	150	(15)
2008–2010	→ Palermo (loan)	11	(1)
2019–2020	Dinamo Tbilisi	5	(1)
2021	Dinamo Batumi	3	(0)
2021-2022	Torpedo Kutaisi	25	(3)

International career^{‡}
2005–2006	Georgia U17	18	(10)
2006–2007	Georgia U19	8	(1)
2011	Georgia U21	3	(0)
2007–2019	Georgia	32	(2)
- * Club domestic league appearances and goals as of 30 March 2024 ‡ National team caps and goals as of 30 March 2024

Levan Mchedlidze (Georgian: ლევან მჭედლიძე, romanized: levan mch'edlidze, pronounced [levan mtʃʼedlidze]; born 24 March 1990) is a retired Georgian professional footballer who last played as a forward for Georgian club Torpedo Kutaisi.

== Club career ==
=== Empoli ===
Originally noted in early 2006 by Empoli scout Gianni Carnevali, he joined the Tuscan side in September 2006, following his impressive performances with the Georgia under-19 national team in a youth competition in Belgium, and despite some interest from FC Bayern Munich. He was officially signed only one year later, in July 2007, due to bureaucratic issues concerning his non-EU citizen status.

==== Loan to Palermo ====
Following Empoli's relegation into Serie B, Mchedlidze's future was put under discussion. On 30 August 2008, Serie A club Palermo announced on their website to have signed Mchedlidze on a year-long loan, with the option to make the deal permanent at the end of the season. Later, Palermo chairman Maurizio Zamparini announced to have paid €6.2 mln for the signing of the young Georgian striker. The club also confirmed the bid to be an actual permanent move, as a technical year-long loan that will be made permanent at the end of the 2008–09 season.

Mchedlidze made his Serie A debut on 24 September 2008, playing fifteen minutes in a league game against Napoli, then scoring his first professional goal only a few weeks later, in what ultimately proved to be the winning goal in a surprising 2–1 away win against Juventus. Despite the high hopes for the young striker, he went on to make just another seven appearances that season and didn't add to his goal tally.

Palermo agreed a one-year extension to his loan with Empoli in June 2009. In December 2009, after a lacklustre start of season, Mchedlidze did not return to Sicily from holidays in Georgia, citing lack of first team chances as the main reason behind his choice. The player was successively excluded from the first team and Palermo director of football Walter Sabatini successively confirmed the club will not arrange a deal for him. As of March 2010, the player has not returned to Sicily and his loan to Palermo was subsequently cancelled due to breach of contract.

=== Return to Empoli ===
In the 2010–11 Serie B season, Mchedlidze made 21 appearances as his side finished mid-table, scoring 2 goals and managing 4 assists. Mchedlidze played a bit-part role for the majority of the 2011–12, 2012–13 and 2013–14 seasons, with most of his appearances coming off the bench. In the 2014–15 Serie A season, Mchedlidze scored 4 goals in the league, including a brace against Internazionale Milano on the final matchday.

He was released by Empoli at the end of the 2018–19 Serie A season, after thirteen years as a player for the Tuscan side.

=== Return to Georgia ===
In September, 2019, Mchedlidze agreed one-plus-one deal with Dinamo Tbilisi.

In March 2021, Mchedlidze signed with Dinamo Batumi.

== International career ==
Despite having never played in his team also because of a knee injury during pre-season training, he was capped for the Georgia national football team at the age of 17, for the Euro 2008 qualifying match against Italy. In spite of his young age, the coach Klaus Toppmöller made him play against the World Champions.

In the following match, Mchedlidze, being featured together with two other teenage team-mates (Levan Kenia and Giorgi Makaridze in the starting lineup), scored the first goal in the 2–0 victory against Scotland, thus marking the first goal of his professional career.

== Career statistics ==
=== Club ===
As of 3 June 2019

Club	Season	League			Playoffs		Cup		Continental		Total	
Club	Season	Division	Apps	Goals	Apps	Goals	Apps	Goals	Apps	Goals	Apps	Goals
Palermo	2008–09	Serie A	9	1	—		—		—		9	1
Palermo	2009–10	Serie A	2	0	—		—		—		2	0
Palermo	Total		11	1	0	0	0	0	0	0	11	1
Empoli	2010–11	Serie B	20	2	—		1	0	—		21	2
Empoli	2011–12	Serie B	24	1	2	1	1	0	—		27	2
Empoli	2012–13	Serie B	19	0	4	1	0	0	—		22	1
Empoli	2013–14	Serie B	23	2	—		2	2	—		25	4
Empoli	2014–15	Serie A	25	4	—		2	1	—		27	5
Empoli	2015–16	Serie A	13	0	—		1	0	—		14	0
Empoli	2016–17	Serie A	15	6	—		0	0	—		15	6
Empoli	2017–18	Serie B	0	0	—		0	0	—		0	0
Empoli	2018–19	Serie A	11	0	—		1	0	—		12	0
Empoli	Total		150	15	6	2	8	3	0	0	163	20
Career total			161	16	6	2	8	3	0	0	175	21

== Honours ==
=== Club ===
Torpedo Kutaisi

- Georgian Cup: 2022

Dinamo Tbilisi:

- Erovnuli Liga: 2019
