= 2015–16 Carpi FC 1909 season =

Carpi
2015–16 season
- President: Claudio Caliumi
- Manager: Fabrizio Castori (until 28 September 2015); Giuseppe Sannino (from 29 September 2015 to 3 November 2015); Fabrizio Castori (from 3 November 2015)
- Stadium: Stadio Alberto Braglia
- Serie A: 18th
- Coppa Italia: Quarter-finals
- Top goalscorer: League: Kevin Lasagna (5); All: Marco Borriello, Kevin Lasagna, Ryder Matos (5)
- Highest home attendance: 17,755 vs Juventus (20 December 2015, Serie A)
- Lowest home attendance: 600 vs Vicenza (3 December 2015, Coppa Italia)
- Average home league attendance: 8,968
Home colours	Away colours

The 2015–16 season was Carpi Football Club 1909's first ever season in Serie A. Having been promoted at the end of the 2014–15 season, the club competed in Serie A and in the Coppa Italia.

== Players ==
=== Squad information ===
As of 2 February 2016

Squad No.	Name	Nationality	Position(s)	Date of Birth (Age)
Goalkeepers
1	Željko Brkić	(Serbia)	GK	9 July 1986 (age 39)
27	Vid Belec	(Slovenia)	GK	6 June 1990 (age 36)
91	Simone Colombi	(Italy)	GK	1 July 1991 (age 35)
Defenders
2	Stefano Sabelli	(Italy)	DF	13 January 1993 (age 33)
3	Gaetano Letizia	(Italy)	RB / CB	29 June 1990 (age 36)
5	Cristian Zaccardo	(Italy)	CB	21 December 1981 (age 44)
6	Riccardo Gagliolo	(Italy)	LB	28 April 1990 (age 36)
13	Fabrizio Poli	(Italy)	CB	26 May 1989 (age 37)
18	Igor Bubnjić	(Croatia)	CB	17 July 1992 (age 33)
21	Simone Romagnoli	(Italy)	CB	9 February 1990 (age 36)
23	Emanuele Suagher	(Italy)	DF	26 November 1992 (age 33)
36	Fabio Daprelà	(Switzerland)	LB	19 February 1991 (age 35)
Midfielders
4	Isaac Cofie	(Ghana)	CM	5 April 1991 (age 35)
8	Raffaele Bianco	(Italy)	DM / CM	25 August 1987 (age 38)
11	Antonio Di Gaudio	(Italy)	LW	16 August 1989 (age 36)
14	Eddy Gnahoré	(France)	MF	14 November 1993 (age 32)
16	Jonathan de Guzmán	(Netherlands)	MF	13 September 1987 (age 38)
17	Marco Crimi	(Italy)	MF	17 March 1990 (age 36)
19	Lorenzo Pasciuti	(Italy)	RM/LM	24 September 1989 (age 36)
20	Lorenzo Lollo	(Italy)	CM/DM	8 December 1990 (age 35)
29	Raphael Martinho	(Brazil)	LW/AM	25 August 1996 (age 29)
58	Matteo Fedele	(Switzerland)	CM	2 July 1992 (age 33)
Strikers
10	Simone Verdi	(Italy)	FW	12 July 1992 (age 33)
15	Kevin Lasagna	(Italy)	CF	10 August 1992 (age 33)
25	Matteo Mancosu	(Italy)	CF	22 December 1984 (age 41)
99	Jerry Mbakogu	(Nigeria)	CF	1 October 1992 (age 33)

== Transfers ==
=== In ===
Date	Pos.	Name	From	Fee
1 July 2015	FW	(Poland) Kamil Wilczek	(Poland) Piast Gliwice	Free
1 July 2015	DF	(Italy) Federico Franchini	(Italy) Chievo	Undisclosed
3 July 2015	GK	(Italy) Francesco Benussi	(Italy) Hellas Verona	Free
6 July 2015	GK	(Italy) Maicol Murano	(Italy) Abano	Free
20 July 2015	MF	(Italy) Andrea Lazzari	(Italy) Fiorentina	Free

==== Loans in ====
Date from	Date to	Pos.	Name	From
8 July 2015	30 June 2016	FW	(Brazil) Ryder Matos	(Italy) Fiorentina
8 July 2015	30 June 2016	DF	(Italy) Luca Marrone	(Italy) Juventus
16 July 2015	30 June 2016	GK	(Serbia) Željko Brkić	(Italy) Udinese
22 July 2015	30 June 2016	DF	(Brazil) Wallace	(England) Chelsea
28 January 2016	30 June 2016	MF	(Netherlands) Jonathan de Guzmán	(Italy) Napoli

=== Out ===
Date	Pos.	Name	To	Fee
30 June 2015	GK	(Italy) Roberto Maurantonio	Unattached	
30 June 2015	GK	(Italy) Renato Dossena	Unattached	
1 July 2015	GK	(Italy) Matteo Brunelli	(Italy) Chievo	

==== Loans out ====
Date from	Date to	Pos.	Name	To
21 July 2015	30 June 2016	DF	(Italy) Andrea Boron	(Italy) Siena
21 July 2015	30 June 2016	MF	(Italy) Alberto Torelli	(Italy) Siena
28 January 2016	30 June 2016	MF	(Italy) Luca Marrone	(Italy) Hellas Verona

== Competitions ==
=== Serie A ===
==== League table ====
Pos	Team	Pld	W	D	L	GF	GA	GD	Pts	Qualification or relegation
16	Palermo	38	10	9	19	38	65	−27	39 (Note: Palermo ahead of Udinese on head-to-head points; Palermo 6 points, Udinese 0 points.)	
17	Udinese	38	10	9	19	35	60	−25	39	
18	Carpi (R)	38	9	11	18	37	57	−20	38	Relegation to Serie B
19	Frosinone (R)	38	8	7	23	35	76	−41	31	Relegation to Serie B
20	Hellas Verona (R)	38	5	13	20	34	63	−29	28	Relegation to Serie B

Source: Serie A, Soccerway
Rules for classification: 1) Points; 2) Head-to-head points; 3) Head-to-head goal difference; 4) Goal difference; 5) Goals scored; 6) Draw.
(R) Relegated

==== Results summary ====
Overall								Home						Away					
Pld	W	D	L	GF	GA	GD	Pts	W	D	L	GF	GA	GD	W	D	L	GF	GA	GD
38	9	11	18	37	57	−20	38	6	5	8	23	26	−3	3	6	10	14	31	−17

Last updated: 15 May 2016.
Source: Competitive matches

==== Results by round ====
Round	1	2	3	4	5	6	7	8	9	10	11	12	13	14	15	16	17	18	19	20	21	22	23	24	25	26	27	28	29	30	31	32	33	34	35	36	37	38
Ground	A	H	A	H	H	A	H	A	H	A	H	A	H	A	H	A	H	A	H	H	A	H	A	A	H	A	H	A	H	A	H	A	H	A	H	A	H	A
Result	L	L	D	L	D	L	W	L	L	L	D	L	L	W	D	L	L	D	W	W	D	D	L	L	L	D	D	D	W	W	L	L	W	D	W	L	L	W
Position	20	20	18	19	19	20	17	19	20	20	20	20	20	19	19	19	19	19	19	18	18	18	18	18	19	19	19	19	19	17	17	17	17	17	17	17	18	18

Updated to match(es) played on 15 May 2016. Source: Competitive matches
A = Away; H = Home; W = Win; D = Draw; L = Loss

==== Matches ====
23 August 2015 1	Sampdoria	5–2	Carpi	Genoa
20:45 CEST (UTC+02:00)	Éder 14' (pen.), 33'; Muriel 21', 31'; Fernando 37'; Coda (yellow card) 71'; Ivan (yellow card) 76' (yellow-red card) 81'	Report	Letizia (yellow card) 13'; Porcari (yellow card) 35'; Lazzari 38'; Marrone (yellow card) 66'; Matos 88'	Stadium: Stadio Luigi Ferraris; Attendance: 21,835; Referee: Michael Fabbri

30 August 2015 2	Carpi	1–2	Internazionale	Modena
20:45 CEST (UTC+02:00)	Lollo (yellow card) 19'; Letizia (yellow card) 70'; Di Gaudio 81'; Gabriel Silva (yellow card) 88'	Report	Jovetić 31', 89' (pen.); Santon (yellow card) 60'; Medel (yellow card) 65'; Handanović (yellow card) 90+2'	Stadium: Stadio Alberto Braglia; Attendance: 14,000; Referee: Davide Massa

13 September 2015 3	Palermo	2–2	Carpi	Palermo
15:00 CEST (UTC+02:00)	Hiljemark 6'; El Kaoutari (yellow card) 40'; González (yellow card) 66'; Đurđević 88'; Vitiello (yellow card) 89'	Report	Gagliolo (yellow card) 9'; Bianco (yellow card) 16'; Vitiello 24' (o.g.); Borriello 64'; Gabriel Silva (yellow card) 90+4'	Stadium: Stadio Renzo Barbera; Attendance: 20,250; Referee: Claudio Gavillucci

20 September 2015 4	Carpi	0–1	Fiorentina	Modena
18:00 CEST (UTC+02:00)	Lollo (yellow card) 17'; Fedele (yellow card) 44'; Cofie (yellow card) 48'	Report	Babacar 35'; Pasqual (yellow card) 41'; Alonso (yellow card) 63'; Tătărușanu (yellow card) 68'; Suárez (yellow card) 69'	Stadium: Stadio Alberto Braglia; Attendance: 7,981; Referee: Marco Di Bello

23 September 2015 5	Carpi	0–0	Napoli	Modena
20:45 CEST (UTC+02:00)	Romagnoli (yellow card) 9'; Zaccardo (yellow card) 13'; Cofie (yellow card) 77'	Report	Valdifiori (yellow card) 7'; Mertens (yellow card) 43'; Koulibaly (yellow card) 58'	Stadium: Stadio Alberto Braglia; Attendance: 9,950; Referee: Gianluca Rocchi

26 September 2015 6	Roma	5–1	Carpi	Rome
18:00 CEST (UTC+02:00)	Manolas 24'; Pjanić 28'; Gervinho 31'; Salah 51'; Digne 68'; Maicon (yellow card) 76'	Report	Cofie (yellow card) 26'; Borriello 34'	Stadium: Stadio Olimpico; Attendance: 33,430; Referee: Massimiliano Irrati

3 October 2015 7	Carpi	2–1	Torino	Modena
18:00 CEST (UTC+02:00)	Padelli 55' (o.g.); Martinho (yellow card) 64'; Matos 72'; Lazzari (yellow card) 89'	Report	Maxi López 75' (pen.); Silva (yellow card) 76'	Stadium: Stadio Alberto Braglia; Attendance: 8,011; Referee: Carmine Russo

18 October 2015 8	Atalanta	3–0	Carpi	Bergamo
15:00 CEST (UTC+02:00)	Pinilla 8'; Gómez 43'; Cigarini 63' (pen.); Grassi (yellow card) 65'	Report	Fedele (yellow card) 36'; Cofie (yellow card) 54'; Bubnjić (yellow card) 63'	Stadium: Stadio Atleti Azzurri d'Italia; Attendance: 14,479; Referee: Fabrizio Pasqua

24 October 2015 9	Carpi	1–2	Bologna	Modena
18:00 CEST (UTC+02:00)	Belec (yellow card) 4'; Lollo (yellow card) 7' (yellow-red card) 38'; Letizia 24'; Spolli (yellow card) 90+3'	Report	Mounier (yellow card) 40'; Mbaye (yellow card) 45'; Gastaldello 47'; Masina 90+3'	Stadium: Stadio Alberto Braglia; Attendance: 6,747; Referee: Paolo Tagliavento

28 October 2015 10	Frosinone	2–1	Carpi	Frosinone
20:45 CET (UTC+01:00)	Soddimo (yellow card) 45' (yellow-red card) 72'; Ciofani 51'; Sammarco (yellow card) 82', (goal) 90+1'	Report	Bianco (yellow card) 45+1'; Marrone 67', (yellow card) 75'; Borriello (red card) 72'; Spolli (yellow card) 87'	Stadium: Stadio Matusa; Attendance: 7,444; Referee: Antonio Damato

1 November 2015 11	Carpi	0–0	Hellas Verona	Modena
15:00 CET (UTC+01:00)	Marrone (yellow card) 14'; Romagnoli (yellow card) 35'	Report	Hallfreðsson (yellow card) 6'; Pisano (yellow card) 38'; Moras (yellow card) 72'	Stadium: Stadio Alberto Braglia; Attendance: 7,093; Referee: Paolo Mazzoleni

8 November 2015 12	Sassuolo	1–0	Carpi	Reggio Emilia
15:00 CET (UTC+01:00)	Falcinelli (yellow card) 23'; Sansone 28'; Pellegrini (yellow card) 58'; Biondini (yellow card) 66'; Consigli (yellow card) 85'	Report	Marrone (yellow card) 27'; Lollo (yellow card) 57'; Zaccardo (yellow card) 64'; Di Gaudio (yellow card) 73'; Wallace (yellow card) 90+2'	Stadium: Mapei Stadium – Città del Tricolore; Attendance: 10,264; Referee: Paolo Valeri

22 November 2015 13	Carpi	1–2	Chievo	Modena
15:00 CET (UTC+01:00)	Lollo (yellow card) 12'; Gamberini 61' (o.g.); Gagliolo (yellow card) 66'; Gabriel Silva (yellow card) 77'; Zaccardo (yellow card) 84'	Report	Inglese 8', (yellow card) 56'; Meggiorini 14'; Birsa (yellow card) 17'; Radovanović (yellow card) 90+3'	Stadium: Stadio Alberto Braglia; Attendance: 7,033; Referee: Fabio Maresca

29 November 2015 14	Genoa	1–2	Carpi	Genoa
15:00 CET (UTC+01:00)	Pavoletti (red card) 6'; Figueiras 8'	Report	Matos (yellow card) 27'; Gagliolo (yellow card) 34'; Borriello 58', (yellow card) 90+1'; Zaccardo 81'	Stadium: Stadio Luigi Ferraris; Attendance: 19,633; Referee: Claudio Gavillucci

6 December 2015 15	Carpi	0–0	Milan	Modena
20:45 CET (UTC+01:00)		Report	Alex (yellow card) 14'; Romagnoli (yellow card) 57'	Stadium: Stadio Alberto Braglia; Attendance: 12,150; Referee: Massimiliano Irrati

13 December 2015 16	Empoli	3–0	Carpi	Empoli
15:00 CET (UTC+01:00)	Maccarone 46', 61'; Saponara 51'	Report	Gagliolo (yellow card) 65'; Di Gaudio (yellow card) 72'	Stadium: Stadio Carlo Castellani; Attendance: 8,863; Referee: Angelo Cervellera

20 December 2015 17	Carpi	2–3	Juventus	Modena
12:30 CET (UTC+01:00)	Borriello 15'; Gabriel Silva (yellow card) 78'; Bonucci 90+2' (o.g.)	Report	Mandžukić 18', 41'; Pogba 50'	Stadium: Stadio Alberto Braglia; Attendance: 17,755; Referee: Piero Giacomelli

6 January 2016 18	Lazio	0–0	Carpi	Rome
15:00 CET (UTC+01:00)	Cataldi (yellow card) 53'; Onazi (yellow card) 90+4'	Report	Pasciuti (yellow card) 51'	Stadium: Stadio Olimpico; Attendance: 20,090; Referee: Carmine Russo

9 January 2016 19	Carpi	2–1	Udinese	Modena
15:00 CET (UTC+01:00)	Pasciuti 26'; Lollo 70'; Suagher (yellow card) 90+3'	Report	Zapata 72'; Piris (yellow card) 78'	Stadium: Stadio Alberto Braglia; Attendance: 5,268; Referee: Michael Fabbri

17 January 2016 20	Carpi	2–1	Sampdoria	Modena
15:00 CET (UTC+01:00)	Lollo 27'; Gagliolo (yellow card) 45' (yellow-red card) 86'; Cofie (yellow card) 48'; Mbakogu 55' (pen.)	Report	Correa 33'; Soriano (yellow card) 73'	Stadium: Stadio Alberto Braglia; Attendance: 9,669; Referee: Maurizio Mariani

23 January 2016 21	Internazionale	1–1	Carpi	Milan
15:00 CET (UTC+01:00)	Telles (yellow card) 20'; Palacio 39', (yellow card) 63'; Jovetić (yellow card) 88'	Report	Crimi (yellow card) 23'; Pasciuti (yellow card) 40' (yellow-red card) 83'; Daprelà (yellow card) 63'; Suagher (yellow card) 79'; Lasagna 90+2'	Stadium: San Siro; Attendance: 35,826; Referee: Andrea Gervasoni

30 January 2016 22	Carpi	1–1	Palermo	Modena
15:00 CET (UTC+01:00)	Cofie (yellow card) 31'; Letizia (yellow card) 74'; Mancosu 74' (pen.)	Report	Gilardino 24'; Quaison (yellow card) 28'; Vázquez (yellow card) 32'; González (yellow card) 74'	Stadium: Stadio Alberto Braglia; Attendance: 6,835; Referee: Nicola Rizzoli

3 February 2016 23	Fiorentina	2–1	Carpi	Florence
15:00 CET (UTC+01:00)	Valero 2'; Błaszczykowski (yellow card) 38'; Vecino (yellow card) 58'; Tătărușanu (yellow card) 61'; Kalinić (yellow card) 82'; Babacar (yellow card) 90+2'; Zárate 90+3'	Report	Suagher (yellow card) 42'; Gagliolo (yellow card) 45'; Lasagna 73'; Lollo (yellow card) 79'	Stadium: Stadio Artemio Franchi; Attendance: 22,791; Referee: Angelo Cervellera

7 February 2016 24	Napoli	1–0	Carpi	Naples
15:00 CET (UTC+01:00)	Albiol (yellow card) 44'; Higuaín 69' (pen.)	Report	Crimi (yellow card) 35'; Bianco (yellow card) 45+2' (yellow-red card) 56'; Poli (yellow card) 51'; Martinho (yellow card) 54'; Romagnoli (yellow card) 89'	Stadium: Stadio San Paolo; Attendance: 37,274; Referee: Daniele Doveri

12 February 2016 25	Carpi	1–3	Roma	Modena
20:45 CET (UTC+01:00)	Suagher (yellow card) 37'; Mancosu (yellow card) 40'; Gagliolo (yellow card) 47'; Mbakogu (yellow card) 54'; Lasagna 61', (yellow card) 76'	Report	Digne 56'; Džeko 84'; Salah 85'	Stadium: Stadio Alberto Braglia; Attendance: 9,166; Referee: Paolo Tagliavento

21 February 2016 26	Torino	0–0	Carpi	Turin
15:00 CET (UTC+01:00)	Glik (yellow card) 25'; Benassi (yellow card) 26'; Peres (yellow card) 30'; Immobile (yellow card) 82'	Report	Crimi (yellow card) 21'; Lollo (yellow card) 38'; Zaccardo (yellow card) 55'; Sabelli (yellow card) 74'	Stadium: Stadio Olimpico di Torino; Attendance: 22,891; Referee: Claudio Gavillucci

27 February 2016 27	Carpi	1–1	Atalanta	Modena
15:00 CET (UTC+01:00)	Lollo (yellow card) 26'; Verdi 75' (pen.); Gagliolo (yellow card) 79'; Poli (yellow card) 89'	Report	Bellini (yellow card) 13'; Kurtić 52'; Diamanti (yellow card) 75'; Borriello (yellow card) 90+1'	Stadium: Stadio Alberto Braglia; Attendance: 6,699; Referee: Gianpaolo Calvarese

6 March 2016 28	Bologna	0–0	Carpi	Bologna
15:00 CET (UTC+01:00)	Giaccherini (yellow card) 45+3'	Report	Romagnoli (yellow card) 18'; Crimi (yellow card) 73'; Gagliolo (yellow card) 90+3'	Stadium: Stadio Renato Dall'Ara; Attendance: 16,820; Referee: Paolo Mazzoleni

13 March 2016 29	Carpi	2–1	Frosinone	Modena
15:00 CET (UTC+01:00)	Bianco (yellow card) 1', (goal) 27'; Pasciuti (yellow card) 60'; De Guzmán 90' (pen.); Letizia (yellow card) 90+5'	Report	Gori (yellow card) 1'; Rosi (yellow card) 67'; Dionisi 71'; Soddimo (yellow card) 89'	Stadium: Stadio Alberto Braglia; Attendance: 8,147; Referee: Luca Banti

20 March 2016 30	Hellas Verona	1–2	Carpi	Verona
15:00 CET (UTC+01:00)	Pisano (yellow card) 32'; Ioniță 63'; Rebić (yellow card) 82' (yellow-red card) 90'	Report	Di Gaudio 42'; Suagher (yellow card) 54'; Lasagna 66'; Poli (yellow card) 84'; Crimi (yellow card) 90+4'	Stadium: Stadio Marc'Antonio Bentegodi; Attendance: 17,707; Referee: Carmine Russo

2 April 2016 31	Carpi	1–3	Sassuolo	Modena
18:00 CEST (UTC+02:00)	Gagliolo (yellow card) 21', (goal) 25'; Bianco (yellow card) 40'; Verdi (yellow card) 89'	Report	Sansone 4', (yellow card) 75'; Magnanelli (yellow card) 24'; Defrel 35'; Vrsaljko (yellow card) 55'; Acerbi 73'	Stadium: Stadio Alberto Braglia; Attendance: 7,457; Referee: Angelo Cervellera

9 April 2016 32	Chievo	1–0	Carpi	Verona
18:00 CEST (UTC+02:00)	Radovanović (yellow card) 22'; Meggiorini (yellow card) 44'; Pellissier 83'	Report	Suagher (yellow card) 20'; Pasciuti (yellow card) 56'; Lollo (yellow card) 66'	Stadium: Stadio Marc'Antonio Bentegodi; Attendance: 8,000; Referee: Michael Fabbri

16 April 2016 33	Carpi	4–1	Genoa	Modena
18:00 CEST (UTC+02:00)	Gagliolo (yellow card) 22'; Lollo (yellow card) 42', (goal) 45+5'; Di Gaudio 45+4'; Pasciuti 49'; Poli (yellow card) 53'; Mbakogu (yellow card) 67'; Sabelli 86'	Report	Izzo (yellow card) 25' (yellow-red card) 45+1'; Pavoletti 34'	Stadium: Stadio Alberto Braglia; Attendance: 9,243; Referee: Nicola Rizzoli

21 April 2016 34	Milan	0–0	Carpi	Milan
21:00 CEST (UTC+02:00)	Balotelli (yellow card) 45+3'; Alex (yellow card) 67'	Report	Cofie (yellow card) 32'; Crimi (yellow card) 45+1'; Suagher (yellow card) 86'	Stadium: San Siro; Attendance: 28,801; Referee: Marco Guida

24 April 2016 35	Carpi	1–0	Empoli	Modena
19:00 CEST (UTC+02:00)	Crimi (yellow card) 21'; Lollo (yellow card) 30' (yellow-red card) 90'; Bianco (yellow card) 79'; Lasagna 85'; Mancosu (yellow card) 90+4'	Report	Ćosić (yellow card) 18'; Mchedlidze (red card) 25'; Zambelli (yellow card) 46'; Paredes (yellow card) 65'; Maccarone (yellow card) 90+5'	Stadium: Stadio Alberto Braglia; Attendance: 7,667; Referee: Paolo Valeri

1 May 2016 36	Juventus	2–0	Carpi	Turin
12:30 CEST (UTC+02:00)	Mandžukić (yellow card) 28'; Hernanes 42', (yellow card) 90+3'; Rugani (yellow card) 51'; Bonucci (yellow card) 66'; Zaza 80'; Lichtsteiner (yellow card) 90+1'; Pogba (yellow card) 90+1'	Report	Martinho (yellow card) 30'; Crimi (yellow card) 45+2'	Stadium: Juventus Stadium; Attendance: 40,316; Referee: Massimiliano Irrati

8 May 2016 37	Carpi	1–3	Lazio	Modena
15:00 CEST (UTC+02:00)	Poli (yellow card) 24'; Pasciuti (yellow card) 26'; Romagnoli (yellow card) 43'; Lollo (yellow card) 55'; Mbakogu 84'; Letizia (yellow card) 90+1'	Report	Biševac 23'; Candreva 32'; Maurício (yellow card) 41'; Parolo (yellow card) 42'; Biglia (yellow card) 42' (yellow-red card) 83'; Klose 73'; Đorđević (red card) 90'	Stadium: Stadio Alberto Braglia; Attendance: 9,881; Referee: Gianluca Rocchi

15 May 2016 38	Udinese	1–2	Carpi	Udine
15:00 CEST (UTC+02:00)	Théréau (red card) 37'; Felipe (yellow card) 59'; Badu (yellow card) 73'; Di Natale 79' (pen.); Pasquale (yellow card) 90+4'	Report	Gagliolo (yellow card) 8'; Verdi 36' (pen.), 38'; Crimi (yellow card) 42'; Suagher (yellow card) 60'	Stadium: Stadio Friuli; Attendance: 20,456; Referee: Paolo Mazzoleni

=== Coppa Italia ===
16 August 2015 Third round	Carpi	2–0 (a.e.t.)	Livorno	Carpi
20:30 CEST (UTC+02:00)	Matos 108', 116'	Report		Stadium: Stadio Sandro Cabassi; Attendance: 1,365; Referee: Andrea Gervasoni

3 December 2015 Fourth round	Carpi	2–1	Vicenza	Modena
21:00 CET (UTC+01:00)	Wallace (yellow card) 37'; Matos 47'; Borriello 61' (pen.)	Report	Modić (yellow card) 7'; Sampirisi (red card) 60'; Gatto 75', (yellow card) 76'	Stadium: Stadio Alberto Braglia; Attendance: 600; Referee: Gianluca Manganiello

16 December 2015 Round of 16	Fiorentina	0–1	Carpi	Florence
16:30 CET (UTC+01:00)	Badelj (yellow card) 4'; Tomović (yellow card) 22'; Gonzalo (yellow card) 53' (yellow-red card) 90+5'	Report	Gabriel Silva (yellow card) 42'; Marrone (yellow card) 45+1'; Matos (yellow card) 67'; Di Gaudio 76'; Mbakogu (yellow card) 90+2' (yellow-red card) 90+4'	Stadium: Stadio Artemio Franchi; Attendance: 8,257; Referee: Andrea Gervasoni

13 January 2015 Quarter-finals	Milan	2–1	Carpi	Milan
21:00 CET (UTC+01:00)	Bacca 14'; Niang (yellow card) 21', (goal) 29'; Boateng (yellow card) 66'; Montolivo (yellow card) 77'	Report	Lollo (yellow card) 22'; Gabriel Silva (yellow card) 46'; Mancosu 50'	Stadium: San Siro; Attendance: 12,319; Referee: Gianpaolo Calvarese

== Statistics ==
=== Appearances and goals ===
No.	Pos	Nat	Player	Total		Serie A		Coppa Italia	
No.	Pos	Nat	Player	Apps	Goals	Apps	Goals	Apps	Goals
Goalkeepers
1	GK	(Serbia) SRB	Željko Brkić	7	0	3+1	0	3	0
27	GK	(Slovenia) SVN	Vid Belec	30	0	30	0	0	0
91	GK	(Italy) ITA	Simone Colombi	1	0	1	0	0	0
Defenders
2	DF	(Italy) ITA	Stefano Sabelli	7	1	6+1	1	0	0
3	DF	(Italy) ITA	Gaetano Letizia	39	1	33+2	1	4	0
5	DF	(Italy) ITA	Cristian Zaccardo	29	0	26+1	0	2	0
6	DF	(Italy) ITA	Riccardo Gagliolo	35	1	29+2	1	4	0
13	DF	(Italy) ITA	Fabrizio Poli	10	0	10	0	0	0
18	DF	(Croatia) CRO	Igor Bubnjić	10	0	8+1	0	1	0
21	DF	(Italy) ITA	Simone Romagnoli	33	0	30	0	3	0
23	DF	(Italy) ITA	Emanuele Suagher	9	0	8+1	0	0	0
36	DF	(Switzerland) SUI	Fabio Daprelà	2	0	0+2	0	0	0
Midfielders
4	MF	(Ghana) GHA	Isaac Cofie	31	0	26+3	0	0+2	0
7	MF	(Italy) ITA	Filippo Porcari	4	0	2+2	0	0	0
8	MF	(Italy) ITA	Raffaele Bianco	27	1	21+5	1	1	0
11	MF	(Italy) ITA	Antonio Di Gaudio	31	4	16+13	3	1+1	1
14	MF	(France) FRA	Eddy Gnahoré	0	0	0	0	0	0
16	MF	(Netherlands) NED	Jonathan de Guzmán	5	1	1+4	1	0	0
17	MF	(Italy) ITA	Marco Crimi	20	0	10+9	0	0+1	0
19	MF	(Italy) ITA	Lorenzo Pasciuti	23	2	19+2	2	1+1	0
20	MF	(Italy) ITA	Lorenzo Lollo	30	3	25+2	3	3	0
29	MF	(Brazil) BRA	Raphael Martinho	13	0	10+1	0	1+1	0
58	MF	(Switzerland) SUI	Matteo Fedele	8	0	8	0	0	0
Forwards
10	FW	(Italy) ITA	Simone Verdi	8	3	3+5	3	0	0
15	FW	(Italy) ITA	Kevin Lasagna	39	5	8+28	5	1+2	0
25	FW	(Italy) ITA	Matteo Mancosu	13	2	7+5	1	0+1	1
99	FW	(Nigeria) NGA	Jerry Mbakogu	26	2	20+4	2	1+1	0
Players transferred out during the season
2	DF	(Brazil) BRA	Wallace	7	0	1+5	0	1	0
7	FW	(Brazil) BRA	Ryder Matos	18	5	14+1	2	3	3
9	FW	(Poland) POL	Kamil Wilczek	4	0	1+2	0	0+1	0
10	MF	(Italy) ITA	Andrea Lazzari	10	1	3+5	1	2	0
12	FW	(Italy) ITA	Marco Borriello	14	5	8+4	4	2	1
14	MF	(Uruguay) URU	Federico Gino	1	0	0	0	1	0
22	GK	(Italy) ITA	Francesco Benussi	5	0	4	0	1	0
33	DF	(Argentina) ARG	Nicolás Spolli	5	0	4	0	0+1	0
34	DF	(Brazil) BRA	Gabriel Silva	20	0	14+2	0	4	0
39	MF	(Italy) ITA	Luca Marrone	13	1	9	1	4	0

Last updated: 15 May 2016
Source: Competitions

=== Goalscorers ===
Rank	No.	Pos	Nat	Name	Serie A	Coppa Italia	Total
1	7	FW	(Brazil)	Ryder Matos	2	3	5
1	12	FW	(Italy)	Marco Borriello	4	1	5
1	15	FW	(Italy)	Kevin Lasagna	5	0	5
4	11	MF	(Italy)	Antonio Di Gaudio	3	1	4
5	10	FW	(Italy)	Simone Verdi	3	0	3
5	20	MF	(Italy)	Lorenzo Lollo	3	0	3
7	19	MF	(Italy)	Lorenzo Pasciuti	2	0	2
7	25	FW	(Italy)	Matteo Mancosu	1	1	2
7	99	FW	(Nigeria)	Jerry Mbakogu	2	0	2
10	2	DF	(Italy)	Stefano Sabelli	1	0	1
10	3	DF	(Italy)	Gaetano Letizia	1	0	1
10	5	DF	(Italy)	Cristian Zaccardo	1	0	1
10	6	DF	(Italy)	Riccardo Gagliolo	1	0	1
10	8	MF	(Italy)	Raffaele Bianco	1	0	1
10	10	MF	(Italy)	Andrea Lazzari	1	0	1
10	16	MF	(Netherlands)	Jonathan de Guzmán	1	0	1
10	39	MF	(Italy)	Luca Marrone	1	0	1
Own goal					4	0	4
Totals					37	6	43

Last updated: 15 May 2016

=== Clean sheets ===
Rank	No.	Pos	Nat	Name	Serie A	Coppa Italia	Total
1	27	GK	(Slovenia)	Vid Belec	6	0	6
2	22	GK	(Italy)	Francesco Benussi	2	1	3
3	1	GK	(Serbia)	Željko Brkić	0	1	1
Totals					8	2	10

Last updated: 25 April 2016
