= 2015–16 Genoa CFC season =

Genoa
2015–16 season
- President: Enrico Preziosi
- Manager: Gian Piero Gasperini
- Stadium: Stadio Luigi Ferraris
- Serie A: 11th
- Coppa Italia: Round of 16
- Top goalscorer: League: Leonardo Pavoletti (14); All: Leonardo Pavoletti (15)
- Highest home attendance: 31,770 vs Sampdoria (5 January 2016, Serie A)
- Lowest home attendance: 6,973 vs Alessandria (15 December 2015, Coppa Italia)
- Average home league attendance: 21,359
| Home colours | Away colours | Third colours |

The 2015–16 season was Genoa Cricket and Football Club's ninth consecutive season in Serie A. The club finished in 11th place in Serie A, and was surprisingly eliminated by Lega Pro side Alessandria in the Coppa Italia.

== Players ==
=== Squad information ===
As of 2 February 2016

Note: Flags indicate national team as defined under FIFA eligibility rules; some limited exceptions apply. Players may hold more than one non-FIFA nationality.

| No. | Pos. | Nation | Player |
|---|---|---|---|
| 1 | GK | ITA | Mattia Perin |
| 2 | DF | MLI | Alassane També |
| 3 | DF | ARG | Cristian Ansaldi (on loan from Zenit Saint Petersburg) |
| 4 | DF | FRA | Sebastian De Maio |
| 5 | DF | ITA | Armando Izzo |
| 8 | DF | ARG | Nicolás Burdisso (captain) |
| 9 | FW | BRA | Bruno Gomes (on loan from Internacional) |
| 11 | FW | ITA | Alessio Cerci (on loan from Atlético Madrid) |
| 15 | DF | ITA | Giovanni Marchese |
| 16 | MF | ESP | Diego Capel |
| 17 | MF | ESP | Suso (on loan from Milan) |
| 18 | MF | FRA | Olivier Ntcham (on loan from Manchester City) |
| 19 | FW | ITA | Leonardo Pavoletti |
| 21 | FW | MKD | Goran Pandev |

| No. | Pos. | Nation | Player |
|---|---|---|---|
| 22 | MF | SRB | Darko Lazović |
| 23 | GK | ITA | Eugenio Lamanna |
| 24 | DF | ARG | Ezequiel Muñoz |
| 29 | DF | ITA | Riccardo Fiamozzi |
| 30 | MF | ITA | Luca Rigoni |
| 31 | MF | SUI | Blerim Džemaili (on loan from Galatasaray) |
| 32 | GK | ITA | Antonio Donnarumma |
| 34 | DF | BRA | Gabriel Silva (on loan from Udinese) |
| 37 | FW | ITA | Giuseppe Panico |
| 42 | FW | SVN | Tim Matavž (on loan from Augsburg) |
| 77 | MF | GRE | Panagiotis Tachtsidis |
| 88 | MF | VEN | Tomás Rincón |
| 93 | MF | URU | Diego Laxalt (on loan from Internazionale) |
| 98 | FW | ESP | Raúl Asencio |

== Transfers ==
=== Out ===
==== Loans out ====
Note: Flags indicate national team as defined under FIFA eligibility rules; some limited exceptions apply. Players may hold more than one non-FIFA nationality.

| No. | Pos. | Nation | Player |
|---|---|---|---|
| — | GK | CZE | Lukas Zima (at Perugia until 30 June 2016) |
| — | DF | ITA | Aleandro Rosi (at Frosinone until 30 June 2016) |
| — | MF | ITA | Rolando Mandragora (at Pescara until 30 June 2016) |
| — | MF | ITA | Marco Soprano (at Cosenza until 30 June 2016) |

| No. | Pos. | Nation | Player |
|---|---|---|---|
| — | MF | ITA | Francesco Todisco (at Rimini until 30 June 2016) |
| — | FW | ITA | Riccardo Improta (at Cesena until 30 June 2016) |
| — | MF | ITA | Michael Ventre (at Cosenza until 30 June 2016) |
| — | MF | GHA | Moro Alhassan (at Carrarese until 30 June 2016) |

== Competitions ==
=== Serie A ===
==== League table ====
| Pos | Team | Pld | W | D | L | GF | GA | GD | Pts |
|---|---|---|---|---|---|---|---|---|---|
| 9 | Chievo | 38 | 13 | 11 | 14 | 43 | 45 | −2 | 50 |
| 10 | Empoli | 38 | 12 | 10 | 16 | 40 | 49 | −9 | 46 (Note: Empoli ahead of Genoa on head-to-head goal difference; Empoli +1, Genoa –1.) |
| 11 | Genoa | 38 | 13 | 7 | 18 | 45 | 48 | −3 | 46 |
| 12 | Torino | 38 | 12 | 9 | 17 | 52 | 55 | −3 | 45 (Note: Torino ahead of Atalanta on head-to-head points; Torino 6 points, Atalanta 0 points.) |
| 13 | Atalanta | 38 | 11 | 12 | 15 | 41 | 47 | −6 | 45 |

Source: Serie A, Soccerway
Rules for classification: 1) Points; 2) Head-to-head points; 3) Head-to-head goal difference; 4) Goal difference; 5) Goals scored; 6) Draw.

==== Results summary ====
| Overall | | | | | | | | Home | | | | | | Away | | | | | |
| Pld | W | D | L | GF | GA | GD | Pts | W | D | L | GF | GA | GD | W | D | L | GF | GA | GD |
|---|---|---|---|---|---|---|---|---|---|---|---|---|---|---|---|---|---|---|---|
| 38 | 13 | 7 | 18 | 45 | 48 | −3 | 46 | 10 | 3 | 6 | 29 | 19 | +10 | 3 | 4 | 12 | 16 | 29 | −13 |

Last updated: 15 May 2016.
Source: Competitive matches

==== Results by round ====
| Round | 1 | 2 | 3 | 4 | 5 | 6 | 7 | 8 | 9 | 10 | 11 | 12 | 13 | 14 | 15 | 16 | 17 | 18 | 19 | 20 | 21 | 22 | 23 | 24 | 25 | 26 | 27 | 28 | 29 | 30 | 31 | 32 | 33 | 34 | 35 | 36 | 37 | 38 |
|---|---|---|---|---|---|---|---|---|---|---|---|---|---|---|---|---|---|---|---|---|---|---|---|---|---|---|---|---|---|---|---|---|---|---|---|---|---|---|
| Ground | A | H | A | H | A | H | A | H | A | A | H | A | H | H | A | H | A | H | A | H | A | H | A | H | A | H | A | H | H | A | H | A | A | H | A | H | A | H |
| Result | L | W | L | L | L | W | D | W | L | D | D | D | W | L | L | L | L | L | W | W | D | D | L | D | L | W | L | W | W | L | W | W | L | W | L | L | W | L |
| Position | 16 | 9 | 11 | 16 | 17 | 14 | 15 | 12 | 16 | 15 | 14 | 15 | 13 | 16 | 16 | 17 | 17 | 17 | 17 | 16 | 16 | 16 | 16 | 16 | 16 | 14 | 15 | 14 | 12 | 12 | 10 | 10 | 11 | 10 | 10 | 12 | 10 | 11 |

Updated to match(es) played on 15 May 2016. Source: Competitive matches
A = Away; H = Home; W = Win; D = Draw; L = Loss

==== Matches ====
| 23 August 2015 1 | Palermo | 1–0 | Genoa | Palermo |
| 20:45 CEST (UTC+02:00) | Vitiello (yellow card) 28'; El Kaoutari 90+1' | Report | Marchese (yellow card) 90' | Stadium: Stadio Renzo Barbera; Attendance: 22,608; Referee: Massimiliano Irrati |

| 30 August 2015 2 | Genoa | 2–0 | Hellas Verona | Genoa |
| 20:45 CEST (UTC+02:00) | Pavoletti 57'; Izzo (yellow card) 59'; Gakpé 76'; Rincón (yellow card) 89' | Report | Moras (yellow card) 45+1'; Pazzini (yellow card) 73' | Stadium: Stadio Luigi Ferraris; Attendance: 19,462; Referee: Daniele Orsato |

| 12 September 2015 3 | Fiorentina | 1–0 | Genoa | Florence |
| 18:00 CEST (UTC+02:00) | Vecino (yellow card) 20'; Badelj (yellow card) 33' (yellow-red card) 64'; Tomović (yellow card) 48'; Babacar 60' | Report | Capel (yellow card) 12'; Rincón (yellow card) 36'; Ntcham (yellow card) 54'; Costa (yellow card) 55' | Stadium: Stadio Artemio Franchi; Attendance: 30,048; Referee: Daniele Doveri |

| 20 September 2015 4 | Genoa | 0–2 | Juventus | Genoa |
| 15:00 CEST (UTC+02:00) | Izzo (yellow card) 26' (yellow-red card) 44'; Džemaili (yellow card) 50' | Report | Evra (yellow card) 17'; Lamanna 37' (o.g.); Pogba 60' (pen.), (yellow card) 61'; Lemina (yellow card) 61'; Zaza (yellow card) 86' | Stadium: Stadio Luigi Ferraris; Attendance: 25,115; Referee: Paolo Valeri |

| 23 September 2015 5 | Lazio | 2–0 | Genoa | Rome |
| 20:45 CEST (UTC+02:00) | Cataldi (yellow card) 25'; Đorđević 35'; Maurício (yellow card) 42'; Felipe Anderson 62'; Gentiletti (yellow card) 64'; Milinković-Savić (yellow card) 76' | Report | Marchese (yellow card) 38'; Cissokho (yellow card) 54' (yellow-red card) 56'; Figueiras (yellow card) 78'; Pandev (red card) 85' | Stadium: Stadio Olimpico; Attendance: 17,000; Referee: Nicola Rizzoli |

| 27 September 2015 6 | Genoa | 1–0 | Milan | Genoa |
| 12:30 CEST (UTC+02:00) | Džemaili 10', (yellow card) 67'; Pavoletti (yellow card) 58'; De Maio (yellow card) 61'; Burdisso (yellow card) 89' | Report | Bonaventura (yellow card) 11'; Romagnoli (yellow card) 18' (yellow-red card) 42'; Calabria (yellow card) 56'; Luiz Adriano (yellow card) 83'; Bertolacci (yellow card) 90+1' | Stadium: Stadio Luigi Ferraris; Attendance: 21,294; Referee: Paolo Tagliavento |

| 4 October 2015 7 | Udinese | 1–1 | Genoa | Udine |
| 15:00 CEST (UTC+02:00) | Edenílson (yellow card) 32'; Di Natale 47'; Danilo (yellow card) 75' | Report | Perotti 76' (pen.); Izzo (yellow card) 89' | Stadium: Stadio Friuli; Attendance: 12,704; Referee: Angelo Cervellera |

| 18 October 2015 8 | Genoa | 3–2 | Chievo | Genoa |
| 15:00 CEST (UTC+02:00) | Pavoletti 13'; Gakpé 17'; Džemaili (yellow card) 50' (yellow-red card) 54'; De Maio (yellow card) 56'; Tachtsidis 90+3', (yellow card) 90+4' | Report | Paloschi 1'; Castro (yellow card) 33'; Pellissier 77'; Pepe (yellow card) 79' | Stadium: Stadio Luigi Ferraris; Attendance: 19,207; Referee: Paolo Mazzoleni |

| 24 October 2015 9 | Empoli | 2–0 | Genoa | Empoli |
| 15:00 CET (UTC+01:00) | Tonelli (yellow card) 35'; Krunić 44'; Zieliński 57', (yellow card) 64'; Livaja (yellow card) 84' | Report | Marchese (yellow card) 29'; Muñoz (yellow card) 34'; Gakpé (yellow card) 52' | Stadium: Stadio Carlo Castellani; Attendance: 8,770; Referee: Domenico Celi |

| 28 October 2015 10 | Torino | 3–3 | Genoa | Turin |
| 20:45 CET (UTC+01:00) | Maxi López 28'; Zappacosta 35'; Benassi (yellow card) 54'; Bovo (yellow card) 69'; Tachtsidis 89' (o.g.) | Report | Laxalt 26', 90+4'; Pavoletti 67'; Muñoz (yellow card) 82' | Stadium: Stadio Olimpico di Torino; Attendance: 16,226; Referee: Daniele Chiffi |

| 1 November 2015 11 | Genoa | 0–0 | Napoli | Genoa |
| 15:00 CET (UTC+01:00) | Izzo (yellow card) 36'; Ntcham (yellow card) 82'; Costa (yellow card) 90+1' | Report | Gabbiadini (yellow card) 85'; López (yellow card) 90+3' | Stadium: Stadio Luigi Ferraris; Attendance: 26,292; Referee: Daniele Doveri |

| 8 November 2015 12 | Frosinone | 2–2 | Genoa | Frosinone |
| 15:00 CET (UTC+01:00) | Blanchard 31', (yellow card) 67'; Diakité 38'; Dionisi (yellow card) 60' | Report | Pavoletti 6'; Costa (yellow card) 13'; De Maio (yellow card) 32' (yellow-red card) 36'; Figueiras (yellow card) 35'; Gakpé 75'; Burdisso (yellow card) 88' | Stadium: Stadio Matusa; Attendance: 6,450; Referee: Gianpaolo Calvarese |

| 22 November 2015 13 | Genoa | 2–1 | Sassuolo | Genoa |
| 15:00 CET (UTC+01:00) | Rincón (yellow card) 25', (goal) 51'; Perin (yellow card) 42'; Perotti (red card) 42'; Burdisso (yellow card) 88'; Pavoletti 90+5' | Report | Berardi (red card) 41'; Acerbi 90+3' | Stadium: Stadio Luigi Ferraris; Attendance: 19,347; Referee: Nicola Rizzoli |

| 29 November 2015 14 | Genoa | 1–2 | Carpi | Genoa |
| 15:00 CET (UTC+01:00) | Pavoletti (red card) 6'; Figueiras 8' | Report | Matos (yellow card) 27'; Gagliolo (yellow card) 34'; Borriello 58', (yellow card) 90+1'; Zaccardo 81' | Stadium: Stadio Luigi Ferraris; Attendance: 19,633; Referee: Claudio Gavillucci |

| 5 December 2015 15 | Internazionale | 1–0 | Genoa | Milan |
| 20:45 CET (UTC+01:00) | Ljajić 59'; D'Ambrosio (yellow card) 69' (yellow-red card) 86'; Telles (yellow card) 82' | Report | Costa (yellow card) 29'; Ansaldi (yellow card) 89'; Perotti (yellow card) 90+1' | Stadium: San Siro; Attendance: 39,485; Referee: Piero Giacomelli |

| 12 December 2015 16 | Genoa | 0–1 | Bologna | Genoa |
| 15:00 CET (UTC+01:00) | Perotti (red card) 81' | Report | Gastaldello (yellow card) 25'; Mounier (yellow card) 73'; Diawara (yellow card) 81' (yellow-red card) 90+3'; Rossettini 90+2' | Stadium: Stadio Luigi Ferraris; Attendance: 19,594; Referee: Marco Di Bello |

| 20 December 2015 17 | Roma | 2–0 | Genoa | Rome |
| 15:00 CET (UTC+01:00) | Nainggolan (yellow card) 22'; Florenzi (yellow card) 29', (goal) 42'; Pjanić (yellow card) 35'; Džeko (red card) 75'; Sadiq 89' | Report | Laxalt (yellow card) 9' | Stadium: Stadio Olimpico; Attendance: 28,133; Referee: Andrea Gervasoni |

| 5 January 2016 18 | Genoa | 2–3 | Sampdoria | Genoa |
| 20:45 CET (UTC+01:00) | Izzo (yellow card) 48'; Rigoni (yellow card) 63'; Pavoletti 69', 81', (yellow card) 83'; Ansaldi (yellow card) 71'; Rincón (yellow card) 78'; Burdisso (yellow card) 90+3' | Report | Soriano 18', 49'; Éder 39'; Fernando (yellow card) 72' | Stadium: Stadio Luigi Ferraris; Attendance: 31,770; Referee: Paolo Valeri |

| 10 January 2016 19 | Atalanta | 0–2 | Genoa | Bergamo |
| 15:00 CET (UTC+01:00) | Paletta (yellow card) 51'; D'Alessandro (yellow card) 90' | Report | Suso (yellow card) 25'; Džemaili 79'; Pavoletti 81'; Izzo (yellow card) 87' | Stadium: Stadio Atleti Azzurri d'Italia; Attendance: 13,946; Referee: Marco Guida |

| 17 January 2016 20 | Genoa | 4–0 | Palermo | Genoa |
| 12:30 CET (UTC+01:00) | Suso 4'; Rigoni (yellow card) 58'; Pavoletti 71', 88'; Burdisso (yellow card) 73'; Rincón 75' | Report | Anđelković (yellow card) 22' (yellow-red card) 65'; González (yellow card) 39'; Goldaniga (yellow card) 90' | Stadium: Stadio Luigi Ferraris; Attendance: 19,387; Referee: Domenico Celi |

| 24 January 2016 21 | Hellas Verona | 1–1 | Genoa | Verona |
| 15:00 CET (UTC+01:00) | Pisano (yellow card) 25'; Pazzini 39'; Hallfreðsson (yellow card) 90+2' | Report | Coppola 19' (o.g.); Džemaili (yellow card) 35'; De Maio (yellow card) 88' | Stadium: Stadio Marc'Antonio Bentegodi; Attendance: 15,806; Referee: Gianluca Rocchi |

| 31 January 2016 22 | Genoa | 0–0 | Fiorentina | Genoa |
| 15:00 CET (UTC+01:00) | Ansaldi (yellow card) 7'; Pavoletti (yellow card) 44' | Report | Roncaglia (yellow card) 32'; Vecino (yellow card) 38'; Costa (yellow card) 82' | Stadium: Stadio Luigi Ferraris; Attendance: 20,832; Referee: Piero Giacomelli |

| 3 February 2016 23 | Juventus | 1–0 | Genoa | Turin |
| 20:45 CET (UTC+01:00) | De Maio 30' (o.g.); Bonucci (yellow card) 39'; Zaza (red card) 90+1' | Report | Muñoz (yellow card) 34'; Capel (yellow card) 64'; Rigoni (yellow card) 73' | Stadium: Juventus Stadium; Attendance: 37,151; Referee: Carmine Russo |

| 6 February 2016 24 | Genoa | 0–0 | Lazio | Genoa |
| 20:45 CET (UTC+01:00) | Suso (yellow card) 52'; Muñoz (yellow card) 61'; Rincón (yellow card) 85' | Report | Parolo (yellow card) 19'; Cataldi (yellow card) 72'; Lulić (yellow card) 86' | Stadium: Stadio Luigi Ferraris; Attendance: 19,670; Referee: Daniele Orsato |

| 14 February 2016 25 | Milan | 2–1 | Genoa | Milan |
| 12:30 CET (UTC+01:00) | Bacca 5'; Honda 64'; Romagnoli (yellow card) 90+2' | Report | Rigoni (yellow card) 67'; Cerci 90+2' | Stadium: San Siro; Attendance: 30,547; Referee: Gianpaolo Calvarese |

| 21 February 2016 26 | Genoa | 2–1 | Udinese | Genoa |
| 15:00 CET (UTC+01:00) | Burdisso (yellow card) 32'; Suso (yellow card) 43'; Cerci 57' (pen.); Laxalt 70'; Izzo (yellow card) 89' | Report | Ali Adnan 33'; Guilherme (yellow card) 37'; Zapata (yellow card) 56'; Hallfreðsson (yellow card) 63' | Stadium: Stadio Luigi Ferraris; Attendance: 19,061; Referee: Andrea Gervasoni |

| 28 February 2016 27 | Chievo | 1–0 | Genoa | Verona |
| 15:00 CET (UTC+01:00) | Castro 51'; Radovanović (yellow card) 53'; Gobbi (yellow card) 88' | Report | Džemaili (yellow card) 48'; Ansaldi (yellow card) 62'; De Maio (yellow card) 90+1' | Stadium: Stadio Marc'Antonio Bentegodi; Attendance: 8,000; Referee: Michael Fabbri |

| 6 March 2016 28 | Genoa | 1–0 | Empoli | Genoa |
| 15:00 CET (UTC+01:00) | Rigoni 48'; Cerci (yellow card) 80' | Report | Zambelli (yellow card) 31'; Büchel (yellow card) 42'; Paredes (yellow card) 75'; Ćosić (yellow card) 86' | Stadium: Stadio Luigi Ferraris; Attendance: 21,134; Referee: Maurizio Mariani |

| 13 March 2016 29 | Genoa | 3–2 | Torino | Genoa |
| 15:00 CET (UTC+01:00) | Cerci 20' (pen.), 45+2' (pen.); Rigoni 66'; Tachtsidis (yellow card) 90' | Report | Immobile 4', 15'; Padelli (yellow card) 45+2'; Benassi (yellow card) 49'; Moretti (yellow card) 67'; Vives (yellow card) 73'; Acquah (yellow card) 85' | Stadium: Stadio Luigi Ferraris; Attendance: 20,225; Referee: Daniele Doveri |

| 20 March 2016 30 | Napoli | 3–1 | Genoa | Naples |
| 18:00 CET (UTC+01:00) | Koulibaly (yellow card) 31'; Jorginho (yellow card) 36'; Insigne (yellow card) 45+3'; Higuaín 51', 81'; El Kaddouri 90+1' | Report | Rincón 10'; Fiamozzi (yellow card) 44'; Džemaili (yellow card) 89' | Stadium: Stadio San Paolo; Attendance: 43,917; Referee: Andrea Gervasoni |

| 3 April 2016 31 | Genoa | 4–0 | Frosinone | Genoa |
| 15:00 CEST (UTC+02:00) | Suso 43', 59', 76'; Perin (yellow card) 61'; Rigoni 72' | Report | Gucher (yellow card) 4'; Ajeti (yellow card) 33'; Gori (yellow card) 45+1'; Dionisi (yellow card) 56' | Stadium: Stadio Luigi Ferraris; Attendance: 20,033; Referee: Paolo Mazzoleni |

| 9 April 2016 32 | Sassuolo | 0–1 | Genoa | Reggio Emilia |
| 18:00 CEST (UTC+02:00) | Duncan (yellow card) 76'; Politano (yellow card) 88' | Report | Džemaili 42'; Muñoz (yellow card) 55' | Stadium: Mapei Stadium – Città del Tricolore; Attendance: 10,249; Referee: Claudio Gavillucci |

| 16 April 2016 33 | Carpi | 4–1 | Genoa | Modena |
| 18:00 CEST (UTC+02:00) | Gagliolo (yellow card) 22'; Lollo (yellow card) 42', (goal) 45+5'; Di Gaudio 45+4'; Pasciuti 49'; Poli (yellow card) 53'; Mbakogu (yellow card) 67'; Sabelli 86' | Report | Izzo (yellow card) 25' (yellow-red card) 45+1'; Pavoletti 34' | Stadium: Stadio Alberto Braglia; Attendance: 9,243; Referee: Nicola Rizzoli |

| 20 April 2016 34 | Genoa | 1–0 | Internazionale | Genoa |
| 20:45 CEST (UTC+02:00) | Muñoz (yellow card) 56'; De Maio 77'; Tachtsidis (yellow card) 80' | Report | Medel (yellow card) 80'; Brozović (yellow card) 88' | Stadium: Stadio Luigi Ferraris; Attendance: 22,781; Referee: Massimililano Irrati |

| 24 April 2016 35 | Bologna | 2–0 | Genoa | Bologna |
| 15:00 CEST (UTC+02:00) | Giaccherini 11'; Rossettini (yellow card) 48'; Foccari 63' | Report | Rincón (yellow card) 37'; Muñoz (yellow card) 42' | Stadium: Stadio Renato Dall'Ara; Attendance: 17,099; Referee: Antonio Damato |

| 2 May 2016 36 | Genoa | 2–3 | Roma | Genoa |
| 19:00 CEST (UTC+02:00) | Tachtsidis 13'; Pavoletti 65'; Rincón (yellow card) 72'; Laxalt (yellow card) 79'; Marchese (yellow card) 90+1' | Report | Salah 6'; Totti (yellow card) 72', (goal) 77'; De Rossi (yellow card) 83'; El Shaarawy 87'; Strootman (yellow card) 90+1' | Stadium: Stadio Luigi Ferraris; Attendance: 21,355; Referee: Andrea Gervasoni |

| 8 May 2016 37 | Sampdoria | 0–3 | Genoa | Genoa |
| 15:00 CEST (UTC+02:00) | Viviano (yellow card) 29'; Diakité (yellow card) 55'; Soriano (yellow card) 58'; Fernando (yellow card) 72'; Sala (yellow card) 78' | Report | Pavoletti 3'; Suso 26', 74', (yellow card) 31'; De Maio (yellow card) 35'; Rincón (yellow card) 60'; Burdisso (yellow card) 68' | Stadium: Stadio Luigi Ferraris; Attendance: 31,375; Referee: Luca Banti |

| 15 May 2016 38 | Genoa | 1–2 | Atalanta | Genoa |
| 18:00 CEST (UTC+02:00) | Laxalt (yellow card) 30'; Pavoletti 58'; Izzo (yellow card) 60'; Rincón (yellow card) 64' | Report | D'Alessandro 52', (yellow card) 53'; Brivio (yellow card) 55'; Masiello (yellow card) 68'; Kurtić 82' | Stadium: Stadio Luigi Ferraris; Attendance: 21,621; Referee: Gianluca Aureliano |

=== Coppa Italia ===
| 15 December 2015 Round of 16 | Genoa | 1–2 (a.e.t.) | Alessandria | Genoa |
| 19:15 CET (UTC+01:00) | Rincón (yellow card) 70'; Pavoletti 90+2'; Figueiras (yellow card) 90+3' | Report | Celjak (yellow card) 39'; Marras 46'; Manfrin (yellow card) 49'; Sirri (yellow card) 96'; Bocalon 113'; Fischnaller (yellow card) 118' | Stadium: Stadio Luigi Ferraris; Attendance: 6,973; Referee: Luca Banti |

== Statistics ==
=== Appearances and goals ===
| No. | Pos | Nat | Player | Total | | Serie A | | Coppa Italia | |
| No. | Pos | Nat | Player | Apps | Goals | Apps | Goals | Apps | Goals |
Goalkeepers
| 1 | GK | (Italy) ITA | Mattia Perin | 25 | 0 | 25 | 0 | 0 | 0 |
| 23 | GK | (Italy) ITA | Eugenio Lamanna | 14 | 0 | 13 | 0 | 1 | 0 |
| 27 | GK | (Kosovo) KOS | Samir Ujkani | 0 | 0 | 0 | 0 | 0 | 0 |
| 32 | GK | (Italy) ITA | Antonio Donnarumma | 0 | 0 | 0 | 0 | 0 | 0 |
Defenders
| 2 | DF | (Mali) MLI | Alassane També | 0 | 0 | 0 | 0 | 0 | 0 |
| 3 | DF | (Argentina) ARG | Cristian Ansaldi | 25 | 0 | 23+1 | 0 | 1 | 0 |
| 4 | DF | (France) FRA | Sebastian De Maio | 28 | 1 | 25+3 | 1 | 0 | 0 |
| 5 | DF | (Italy) ITA | Armando Izzo | 34 | 0 | 30+3 | 0 | 1 | 0 |
| 8 | DF | (Argentina) ARG | Nicolás Burdisso | 29 | 0 | 28 | 0 | 1 | 0 |
| 15 | DF | (Italy) ITA | Giovanni Marchese | 11 | 0 | 7+4 | 0 | 0 | 0 |
| 24 | DF | (Argentina) ARG | Ezequiel Muñoz | 18 | 0 | 17+1 | 0 | 0 | 0 |
| 29 | DF | (Italy) ITA | Riccardo Fiamozzi | 8 | 0 | 4+4 | 0 | 0 | 0 |
| 34 | DF | (Brazil) BRA | Gabriel Silva | 11 | 0 | 8+3 | 0 | 0 | 0 |
| 90 | DF | (Senegal) SEN | Issa Cissokho | 13 | 0 | 6+7 | 0 | 0 | 0 |
Midfielders
| 16 | MF | (Spain) ESP | Diego Capel | 20 | 0 | 5+15 | 0 | 0 | 0 |
| 17 | MF | (Spain) ESP | Suso | 19 | 6 | 15+4 | 6 | 0 | 0 |
| 18 | MF | (France) FRA | Olivier Ntcham | 18 | 0 | 11+6 | 0 | 1 | 0 |
| 30 | MF | (Italy) ITA | Luca Rigoni | 18 | 2 | 14+4 | 2 | 0 | 0 |
| 31 | MF | (Switzerland) SUI | Blerim Džemaili | 26 | 3 | 22+4 | 3 | 0 | 0 |
| 77 | MF | (Greece) GRE | Panagiotis Tachtsidis | 24 | 2 | 7+16 | 2 | 1 | 0 |
| 88 | MF | (Venezuela) VEN | Tomás Rincón | 33 | 3 | 32 | 3 | 1 | 0 |
| 93 | MF | (Uruguay) URU | Diego Laxalt | 36 | 3 | 35 | 3 | 1 | 0 |
Forwards
| 9 | FW | (Brazil) BRA | Bruno Gomes | 0 | 0 | 0 | 0 | 0 | 0 |
| 11 | FW | (Italy) ITA | Alessio Cerci | 11 | 5 | 6+5 | 5 | 0 | 0 |
| 19 | FW | (Italy) ITA | Leonardo Pavoletti | 26 | 15 | 22+3 | 14 | 1 | 1 |
| 21 | FW | (North Macedonia) MKD | Goran Pandev | 16 | 0 | 9+6 | 0 | 1 | 0 |
| 22 | FW | (Serbia) SRB | Darko Lazović | 16 | 0 | 6+9 | 0 | 0+1 | 0 |
| 37 | FW | (Italy) ITA | Giuseppe Panico | 1 | 0 | 0+1 | 0 | 0 | 0 |
| 42 | FW | (Slovenia) SVN | Tim Matavž | 7 | 0 | 5+2 | 0 | 0 | 0 |
Players transferred out during the season
| 10 | MF | (Argentina) ARG | Diego Perotti | 17 | 1 | 14+2 | 1 | 0+1 | 0 |
| 11 | DF | (Portugal) POR | Diogo Figueiras | 10 | 1 | 7+2 | 1 | 1 | 0 |
| 13 | FW | (Togo) TOG | Serge Gakpé | 14 | 3 | 8+5 | 3 | 0+1 | 0 |
| 20 | MF | (Argentina) ARG | Tino Costa | 12 | 0 | 12 | 0 | 0 | 0 |
| 27 | MF | (Slovakia) SVK | Juraj Kucka | 1 | 0 | 1 | 0 | 0 | 0 |

Last updated: 15 May 2016
Source: Competitions

=== Goalscorers ===
| Rank | No. | Pos | Nat | Name | Serie A | Coppa Italia | Total |
|---|---|---|---|---|---|---|---|
| 1 | 19 | FW | (Italy) | Leonardo Pavoletti | 14 | 1 | 15 |
| 2 | 17 | MF | (Spain) | Suso | 6 | 0 | 6 |
| 3 | 11 | FW | (Italy) | Alessio Cerci | 5 | 0 | 5 |
| 4 | 13 | FW | (Togo) | Serge Gakpé | 3 | 0 | 3 |
| 4 | 31 | MF | (Switzerland) | Blerim Džemaili | 3 | 0 | 3 |
| 4 | 88 | MF | (Venezuela) | Tomás Rincón | 3 | 0 | 3 |
| 4 | 93 | MF | (Uruguay) | Diego Laxalt | 3 | 0 | 3 |
| 8 | 30 | MF | (Italy) | Luca Rigoni | 2 | 0 | 2 |
| 8 | 77 | MF | (Greece) | Panagiotis Tachtsidis | 2 | 0 | 2 |
| 10 | 4 | DF | (France) | Sebastian De Maio | 1 | 0 | 1 |
| 10 | 10 | MF | (Argentina) | Diego Perotti | 1 | 0 | 1 |
| 10 | 11 | DF | (Portugal) | Diogo Figueiras | 1 | 0 | 1 |
| Own goal | | | | | 1 | 0 | 0 |
| Totals | | | | | 45 | 1 | 46 |

Last updated: 15 May 2016

=== Clean sheets ===
| Rank | No. | Pos | Nat | Name | Serie A | Coppa Italia | Total |
|---|---|---|---|---|---|---|---|
| 1 | 1 | GK | (Italy) | Mattia Perin | 8 | 0 | 8 |
| 2 | 23 | GK | (Italy) | Eugenio Lamanna | 4 | 0 | 4 |
| Totals | | | | | 12 | 0 | 12 |

Last updated: 15 May 2016
