= Emanuele Suagher =

Italian footballer (born 1992)

Personal information
- Date of birth: 26 November 1992 (age 33)
- Place of birth: Romano di Lombardia, Italy
- Height: 1.92 m (6 ft 4 in)
- Position: Centre back

Team information
- Current team: Südtirol (technical coach)

Youth career
- Atalanta

Senior career*
Years	Team	Apps	(Gls)
2010–2019	Atalanta	0	(0)
2011–2012	→ Tritium (loan)	22	(0)
2012–2013	→ Pisa (loan)	14	(1)
2013–2014	→ Crotone (loan)	23	(0)
2014–2015	→ Carpi (loan)	20	(0)
2016	→ Carpi (loan)	9	(0)
2017	→ Bari (loan)	6	(0)
2017–2018	→ Avelino (loan)	10	(0)
2018	→ Cesena (loan)	15	(0)
2018–2019	→ Carpi (loan)	14	(2)
2019–2021	Ternana	46	(4)
2021–2022	Feralpisalò	4	(0)
2022	→ Vibonese (loan)	14	(0)
2022–2023	Pro Sesto	7	(1)
2023–2024	Mantova	6	(1)
Total		210	(9)

International career
2010–2011	Italy U19	2	(0)
2011–2013	Italy U20	7	(0)
2014	Italy U21	1	(0)
- * Club domestic league appearances and goals

Emanuele Suagher (born 26 November 1992) is an Italian former professional footballer who plays as a centre-back and technical coach for Südtirol.

== Club career ==
=== Atalanta ===
==== Loan to Tritium ====
On 1 July 2011, Suagher was signed by Serie C side Tritium on a season-long loan deal alongside Marcello Possenti, Jurgen Pandiani and Christian Monacizzo. On 12 September he made his professional debut as a substitute replacing Daniele Casiraghi in the 70th minute of a 2–0 home win over Ternana. On 12 October, Saugher played his first match as a starter for Tritium, a 1–1 home draw against Foggia, he was replaced by Filippo Corti in the 55th minute. On 23 October he played his first entire match for Tritium, a 2–1 home defeat against Pro Vercelli. On 19 December he was sent off with a red card in the 28th minute of a 1–0 away win over Viareggio. On 4 April 2012, Suagher was sent off for the second time in the 70th minute of a 3–1 away defeat against Reggiana. Suagher ended his season-long loan to Tritium with 22 appearances, 16 as a starter.

==== Loan to Pisa ====
On 1 July 2012, Suagher was loaned to Serie C club Pisa on a season-long loan deal. On 12 August he made his debut for Pisa 4–2 defeat at penalties after a 2–2 away draw against Padova in the second round of Coppa Italia. On 2 September he made his Serie C debut for Pisa in a 3–1 home win over Latina, but he was replaced only after 2 minute by Paolo Rozzio. On 3 March 2013 he played his first entire match for Pisa, a 0–0 home draw against Paganese. On 28 April he scored his first professional goal in the 30th minute of a 3–1 away win over Prato. Suagher ended his season-long loan to Pisa with 14 appearances, all as a starter, and 1 goal.

==== Loan to Crotone ====
On 12 July 2013, Suagher was signed by Serie B club Crotone on a season-long loan deal. On 11 August he made his debut for Crotone in a 2–0 home win over Latina in the second round of Coppa Italia, he was replaced by Giuseppe Prestia in the 32nd minute. On 23 November he made his Serie B debut for Crotone as a substitute replacing Lorenzo Pasqualini in the 69th minute of a 3–2 home win over Avellino. On 29 December he played his first match as a starter for Crotone, a 2–1 home defeat against Palermo, he was replaced by Ewome Kelvin Matute in the 60th minute. On 27 January 2018, Suagher played his first entire match for Crotone, a 0–0 home draw against Robur Siena. Suagher ended his loan to Crotone with 24 appearances.

==== Loan to Carpi ====
On 25 August 2014, Suagher was loaned to Serie B club Carpi on a season-long loan deal. On 30 August he made his Serie B debut for Carpi as a substitute replacing Raffaele Bianco in the 89th minute of a 1–1 away draw against Livorno. On 19 September he played his first entire match for Carpi, a 2–2 home draw against Trapani. On 22 November he was sent off with a double yellow card in the 61st minute of a 3–3 away draw against Brescia. In early February 2015 he broke his anterior cruciate ligament and the recovery time is expected to be six months. Suagher ended his season-long loan to Carpi with 20 appearances and with the Serie B title.

==== Second loan to Carpi ====
After being 3 times an unused substitute in the first part of the season, on 4 January 2016, Suagher was loaned back to Carpi on a 6-month loan deal. On 9 January he made his Serie A debut as a substitute replacing Jerry Mbakogu in the 91st minute of a 2–1 home win over Udinese. On 24 January he played his first entire match in Serie A for Carpi, a 1–1 away draw against Inter. Suagher ended his loan to Carpi with 9 appearances, including 8 as a starter but Carpi was relegated in Serie B.

==== Loan to Bari ====
On 25 January 2017, Suagher was signed by Serie B club Bari on a season-long loan.

==== Loan to Avellino and Cesena ====
On 24 July 2017, Suagher was loaned to Serie B club Avellino on a season-long loan deal. In January 2018 he joined to Serie B club Cesena on a 6-month loan deal.

==== Third loan to Carpi ====
On 3 August 2018, Suagher joined for the third time to Carpi on loan until 30 June 2019.

=== Ternana ===
On 11 July 2019, he joined Ternana on a 2-year contract.

=== Feralpisalò ===
On 15 July 2021, he signed a two-year contract with Feralpisalò. On 27 January 2022, he joined Vibonese on loan.

=== Pro Sesto ===
On 25 August 2022, Suagher moved to Pro Sesto.

=== Mantova ===
On 14 July 2023, Suagher joined Mantova on a one-season deal.

On 17 January 2024, following the 6th cruciate ligament of his career, Suagher announced his retirement as a footballer. He concurrently announced that he would be switching careers and joining Mantova as a member of coach Davide Possanzini's team.

== International career ==
He represented Italy at the under-19 level in two friendlies: against Romania and Turkey. He played 4 matches in 2011–12 Four Nations Tournament and 3 friendlies against Ghana, Macedonia and Denmark.
