= Wallace (footballer, born May 1994) =

Brazilian footballer

Personal information
- Full name: Wallace Oliveira dos Santos
- Date of birth: 1 May 1994 (age 32)
- Place of birth: Rio de Janeiro, Brazil
- Height: 1.75 m (5 ft 9 in)
- Position: Right back

Youth career
- 2005–2011: Fluminense

Senior career*
| Years | Team | Apps | (Gls) |
| 2011–2013 | Fluminense | 30 | (1) |
| 2013–2018 | Chelsea | 0 | (0) |
| 2013–2014 | → Inter Milan (loan) | 4 | (0) |
| 2014–2015 | → Vitesse (loan) | 23 | (1) |
| 2015 | → Carpi (loan) | 7 | (0) |
| 2016–2017 | → Grêmio (loan) | 21 | (0) |
| 2019 | Figueirense | 0 | (0) |
| 2022 | Sampaio Corrêa-RJ | 5 | (0) |

International career^{‡}
| 2011 | Brazil U17 | 13 | (1) |
| 2012–2014 | Brazil U20 | 2 | (0) |
- * Club domestic league appearances and goals as of 11 December 2016 (UTC) ‡ National team caps and goals as of 26 November 2012

Wallace Oliveira dos Santos, or simply Wallace (born 1 May 1994), is a Brazilian professional footballer who played as a right back.

== Club career ==
=== Fluminense ===
Wallace started his career with Brazilian club Fluminense, an attacking right-back, Wallace made his senior debut at the age of 17. He has since gone on to appear many times for the first team, helping them to the Brazilian league championship, the Rio State League and the Guanabara Cup.

=== Chelsea ===
On 4 December 2012, Chelsea confirmed they had signed Wallace. As part of the deal, the 19-year-old central defender who can also play right, left and midfield would remain with Fluminense until the end of the season. He made his first appearance in a Chelsea jersey on 17 July 2013 in a pre-season friendly match versus Singha All Stars in which he earned a penalty for his side which Romelu Lukaku converted.

==== Loan to Internazionale ====
Due to a lack of work permit, Wallace was required to be loaned out. On 14 August 2013, Wallace was loaned to Internazionale on a season long deal. He made his debut for the club on 1 September 2013 in a 0–3 away win at Catania, coming on as an 83rd-minute substitute for Jonathan. Wallace made his second appearance for Inter in a 0–7 thumping at Sassuolo on 22 September 2013, again coming on as a second-half substitute. He played just four matches for Inter, three of them as a substitute.

==== Loan to Vitesse ====
On 30 June 2014, Wallace was loaned for the upcoming season to the Dutch Eredivisie club Vitesse Arnhem, with whom Chelsea have a partnership.

On 10 August 2014, Wallace made his debut for Vitesse against Ajax, playing the full 90 minutes; the game ended in a 4–1 loss for Vitesse. On 27 September 2014, Wallace scored his first goal for Vitesse against FC Dordrecht, assisted by fellow Chelsea loanee, Bertrand Traoré; the ended in a 6–2 win for Vitesse. Wallace continued to be the first-choice right back for Vitesse until he broke his hand on 25 October 2014, during the game against NAC Breda. On 22 November 2014, Wallace returned to the starting line-up against AZ Alkmaar; the match ended in a 1–0 loss for Vitesse.

On 10 April 2015, Wallace was arrested for suspicion of sexual offense, but was released later without any charges. Following this incident, Wallace returned to the first team on 24 April on the bench, and coming on for the last 11 minutes replacing Kevin Diks in the match against ADO Den Haag.

==== Loan to Carpi ====
On 22 July 2015, Wallace joined newly promoted Italian side Carpi on a season-long loan with an option to purchase the player at the end of the spell. He made his debut for the club on 23 August 2015, in a 5–2 defeat against Sampdoria, coming off the bench to play 20 minutes.

==== Loan to Grêmio ====
On 4 January 2016, Wallace was loaned to Grêmio by Chelsea for an 18-month period to replace Rafael Galhardo in the 2016 Copa Libertadores On 31 January 2016, Wallace made his Grêmio debut in a 3–1 victory over Brasil de Pelotas, playing the full 90 minutes.

== International career ==
Wallace helped Brazil win the South American Under-17 Championship in 2011 before contributing to their fourth-placed finish at the Under-17 World Cup in Mexico three months later. On 30 May 2014 Wallace scored the first of seven goals for Brazil U20 vs Qatar U20 in the Toulon tournament.

== Career statistics ==
As of match played 6 April 2017.

| Club | Season | League | | | Cup | | Continental | | Other | | Total | |
| Club | Season | Division | Apps | Goals | Apps | Goals | Apps | Goals | Apps | Goals | Apps | Goals |
|---|---|---|---|---|---|---|---|---|---|---|---|---|
| Fluminense | 2011 | Série A | 3 | 0 | — | | — | | 0 | 0 | 3 | 0 |
| Fluminense | 2012 | Série A | 18 | 1 | — | | — | | 4 (Note: Appearance(s) in Campeonato Carioca) | 0 | 22 | 1 |
| Fluminense | 2013 | Série A | 0 | 0 | — | | — | | 5 | 0 | 5 | 0 |
| Fluminense | Total | | 21 | 1 | — | | — | | 9 | 0 | 30 | 1 |
| Internazionale (loan) | 2013–14 | Serie A | 3 | 0 | 1 | 0 | — | | — | | 4 | 0 |
| Vitesse (loan) | 2014–15 | Eredivisie | 18 | 1 | 1 | 0 | — | | 4 (Note: Appearance(s) in Eredivisie European play-offs) | 0 | 23 | 1 |
| Carpi (loan) | 2015–16 | Serie A | 6 | 0 | 1 | 0 | — | | — | | 7 | 0 |
| Grêmio (loan) | 2016 | Série A | 9 | 0 | 0 | 0 | 3 (Note: Appearance(s) in Copa Libertadores) | 0 | 9 (Note: Eight appearances in Campeonato Gaúcho, one in Primeira Liga) | 0 | 21 | 0 |
| Grêmio (loan) | 2017 | Série A | 0 | 0 | 0 | 0 | 0 | 0 | 2 (Note: Appearance(s) in Primeira Liga) | 0 | 2 | 0 |
| Grêmio (loan) | Total | | 9 | 0 | 0 | 0 | 3 | 0 | 11 | 0 | 23 | 0 |
| Career total | | | 57 | 2 | 3 | 0 | 3 | 0 | 24 | 0 | 87 | 2 |

== Honours ==
Fluminense

- Campeonato Brasileiro Série A: 2012
- Campeonato Carioca: 2012
- Taça Guanabara: 2012

Grêmio

- Copa do Brasil: 2016
