= Christian Monacizzo =

Italian footballer (born 1991)

Personal information
- Date of birth: April 5, 1991 (age 35)
- Place of birth: La Spezia, Italy
- Position: Midfielder

Team information
- Current team: A.S. Lucchese Libertas 1905

Youth career
- 2008–2011: Atalanta

Senior career*
Years	Team	Apps	(Gls)
2010–2011	Atalanta	0	(0)
2011–2013	Tritium	22	(0)
2013–2014	Atalanta	0	(0)
2014–2015	Sestri Levante	33	(1)
2015–	A.S. Lucchese Libertas 1905	27	(1)

International career
2008	Italy U-17	1	(0)
- * Club domestic league appearances and goals as of 13 september 2012

Christian Monacizzo (born April 5, 1991) is an Italian professional football player who plays in the Lega Pro Prima Divisione for S.S. Tritium 1908, on loan from Atalanta. In the 2014-2015 season he plays for Sestri Levante, in Serie D.
