= Alberto Torelli =

Italian footballer (born 1995)

Personal information
- Date of birth: 11 May 1995 (age 31)
- Place of birth: Pesaro, Italy
- Height: 1.82 m (5 ft 11 1/2 in)
- Position: Midfielder

Team information
- Current team: Atletico Gallo

Senior career*
Years	Team	Apps	(Gls)
2011–2014	Vis Pesaro	70	(4)
2014–2018	Carpi	2	(0)
2014–2015	→ Santarcangelo (loan)	20	(0)
2015–2016	→ Siena (loan)	14	(0)
2016–2017	→ Carrarese (loan)	20	(1)
2017–2018	→ Fano (loan)	21	(3)
2018–2019	Giulianova	29	(5)
2019	Legnago Salus	14	(0)
2019–2020	Giulianova	11	(2)
2020	Torres	3	(0)
2020–2021	Chions	32	(6)
2021–2022	Lumezzane		
2022–	Atletico Gallo		
- * Club domestic league appearances and goals as of 21:22, 14 February 2023 (UTC)

Alberto Torelli (born 11 May 1995) is an Italian football player. He plays for Italian Eccellenza club Atletico Gallo.

== Club career ==
He made his Serie C debut for Santarcangelo on 30 August 2014 in a game against Lucchese.

On 25 September 2018, Torelli signed for Giulianova.
