= Armando Izzo =

Italian footballer (born 1992)

Personal information
- Date of birth: 2 March 1992 (age 34)
- Place of birth: Naples, Italy
- Height: 1.83 m (6 ft 0 in)
- Position: Centre-back

Team information
- Current team: Avellino
- Number: 4

Youth career
- Napoli

Senior career*
Years	Team	Apps	(Gls)
2011–2012	Napoli	0	(0)
2011–2012	→ Triestina (loan)	13	(1)
2012–2014	Avellino	58	(2)
2014–2018	Genoa	98	(2)
2018–2023	Torino	104	(7)
2022–2023	→ Monza (loan)	30	(1)
2023–2026	Monza	67	(4)
2026–	Avellino	9	(1)

International career^{‡}
2019	Italy	3	(0)
- * Club domestic league appearances and goals as of 10 May 2026 ‡ National team caps and goals as of 21:45, 18 November 2019 (UTC)

Armando Izzo (Italian pronunciation: [arˈmando ˈittso]; born 2 March 1992) is an Italian professional footballer who plays as a centre-back for Serie B club Avellino. He previously played for the Italy national team.

== Club career ==
=== Early career ===
Izzo started playing football at the age of 13 with ARCI Scampia, before moving to Napoli, where he also won a Campionato Nazionale Dante Berretti. In the 2011–12 season, he went on loan to Triestina in Lega Pro Prima Divisione, with whom he played 13 games and scored his first professional career goal.

On 31 January 2012, Izzo joined Avellino in a co-ownership deal, with whom he played 6 games. The following season, Izzo made 22 appearances and scored a goal, as Avellino won the league and were promoted to Serie B. Izzo debuted in Serie B in the 2013–14 season, ending the season with a goal in 30 appearances.

=== Genoa ===
During the summer he was sold to Genoa, with whom he debuted in Serie A on 5 October 2014, in a 2–1 win away against Parma. He scored his first goal in the top flight on 11 January 2015, at San Siro against Inter Milan. On 1 April 2015, he renewed his contract with Genoa until 2019. Izzo ended the season with 20 appearances and one goal.

The following season makes his first league appearance of the season in a 2–0 win against Verona. He made 33 appearances for Genoa during the season.

In the 2016–17 season, he was a starter in defence for the Ligurian team, while the following season, he made only 16 appearances due to injuries and disqualifications. He scored his only goal of the season on 25 October 2017, opening the scoring in a 2–3 home defeat against Napoli. On 12 May 2018, in an away game against Benevento, he made his hundredth appearance for Genoa.

=== Torino ===
On 4 July 2018, Izzo signed a four-year contract with Torino. He made his debut with Torino on 12 August during a 4–0 win over against Cosenza in the Coppa Italia. On 4 November, he scored his first goal in Serie A with Torino, in a 1–4 away victory against Sampdoria.

=== Monza ===
On 1 September 2022, Izzo joined newly-promoted Serie A side Monza on a one-year loan. He made his debut on 5 September, as a second-half substitute in a 2–0 league defeat to Atalanta. Following the end of the loan spell, on 5 July 2023, Monza signed Izzo permanently on a three-year deal.

=== Return to Avellino ===
On 23 January 2026, Izzo returned to Avellino on a three-and-a-half-year contract.

== International career ==
On 5 November 2016, Izzo was called up to the senior squad for the first time by Gian Piero Ventura for Italy's 2018 FIFA World Cup Qualification match against Liechtenstein and a friendly match against Germany.

On 15 March 2019, Izzo received a call-up from Roberto Mancini for Italy's UEFA Euro 2020 qualifying matches against Finland and Liechtenstein later that month. On 26 March, he made his senior international debut in a 6–0 home win over Liechtenstein.

== Match-fixing ==
On 23 May 2016, Izzo, along with midfielders Luca Pini and Francesco Millesi, was put under investigation by the anti-mafia police department in Naples (DDA) after being accused of being directly involved with a Camorra clan based in Secondigliano in altering the results of the Serie B matches Modena–Avellino (1–0) from 17 March 2014, and Avellino–Reggina (3–0) from 25 May 2014. On 3 March 2017, the Italian Football Federation's prosecutor asked for Izzo to be suspended for six years, also requesting that collateral estoppel be applied, and demanded that he should receive a €20,000 fine. On 12 April, he received an 18-month ban from football and was also fined €50,000. On 19 May, his ban was reduced to six months. On 4 May 2023, Izzo was found guilty of associating with the Camorra and sporting fraud, and sentenced to five years in prison.

== Style of play ==
Izzo is a right-footed defender who mainly plays as a centre-back. He has often played in a three-man back-line throughout his career, a position which best utilises his dynamism, and which also allows him to contribute offensively as well as defensively. He has also been deployed as a right-sided full-back on occasion. A strong, hard-working, and tenacious defender, he is known for his tackling ability and anticipation.

== Career statistics ==
=== Club ===
As of match played 24 May 2025

Appearances and goals by club, season and competition
Club	Season	League			Coppa Italia		Continental		Other		Total	
Club	Season	Division	Apps	Goals	Apps	Goals	Apps	Goals	Apps	Goals	Apps	Goals
Triestina (loan)	2011–12	Lega Pro	13	1	3	0	—		—		16	1
Avellino	2011–12	Lega Pro	6	0	0	0	—		—		6	0
Avellino	2012–13	Lega Pro	22	1	2	0	—		—		24	1
Avellino	2013–14	Serie B	30	1	4	0	—		—		34	1
Avellino	Total		58	2	6	0	0	0	0	0	64	2
Genoa	2014–15	Serie A	20	1	1	0	—		—		21	1
Genoa	2015–16	Serie A	33	0	1	0	—		—		34	0
Genoa	2016–17	Serie A	29	0	1	0	—		—		30	0
Genoa	2017–18	Serie A	16	1	0	0	—		—		16	1
Genoa	Total		98	2	3	0	0	0	0	0	101	2
Torino	2018–19	Serie A	37	4	2	0	—		—		39	4
Torino	2019–20	Serie A	31	1	1	0	5	2	—		37	3
Torino	2020–21	Serie A	25	2	1	0	—		—		26	2
Torino	2021–22	Serie A	11	0	2	0	—		—		13	0
Torino	Total		104	7	6	0	5	2	0	0	115	9
Monza	2022–23	Serie A	30	1	1	0	—		—		31	1
Monza	2023–24	Serie A	23	0	1	0	—		—		24	0
Monza	2024–25	Serie A	30	1	3	0	—		—		33	1
Monza	Total		83	2	5	0	0	0	0	0	88	2
Career total			356	14	23	0	5	2	0	0	384	16

=== International ===
As of match played 18 November 2019

National team	Year	Apps	Goals
Italy	2019	3	0
Total		3	0

== Honours ==
Avellino

- Lega Pro Prima Divisione: 2012–13
- Supercoppa di Lega Pro Prima Divisione: 2013
