= Raffaele Bianco =

Italian footballer (born 1987)

Personal information
- Date of birth: 25 August 1987 (age 39)
- Place of birth: Aversa, Italy
- Height: 1.80 m (5 ft 11 in)
- Position: Midfielder

Youth career
- Juventus

Senior career*
Years	Team	Apps	(Gls)
2006–2011	Juventus	4	(1)
2007–2008	→ Piacenza (loan)	13	(1)
2008–2009	→ Bari (loan)	22	(0)
2009–2010	→ Modena (loan)	31	(0)
2010–2011	→ Benevento (loan)	24	(0)
2011–2012	Spezia	27	(1)
2012–2013	Juventus	0	(0)
2012–2013	→ Carpi (loan)	23	(0)
2014–2017	Carpi	112	(6)
2017–2019	Perugia	52	(1)
2019–2022	Bari	72	(1)
2022–2024	Audace Cerignola	38	(0)

Managerial career
- 2024–: Bari (Youth Center Manager)
- * Club domestic league appearances and goals

Raffaele Bianco (born 25 August 1987) is an Italian former footballer who played as a midfielder.

== Career ==
=== Juventus ===
A product of the Juventus F.C. Youth Sector, Bianco was one of several academy youngsters called up to the Juventus first team for their season in Serie B, in the aftermath of Calciopoli. On 14 April 2007, he made his first team and league debut, coming on as a 69th-minute substitute for Raffaele Palladino in a 1–3 away victory over U.S. Lecce at the Stadio Via del Mare. He managed 4 appearances in Serie B and scored his first goal in the last matchday, a 3–2 loss to Spezia.

==== 2007–08 season: Loan to Piacenza ====
After Juventus were promoted back to Serie A for the 2007–08 season, Bianco was loaned to Serie B club Piacenza Calcio on a season-long loan deal, to gain first team experience. On 18 August, Bianco made his debut for Piacenza in a 2–1 away win over Ravenna in the second round of Coppa Italia, he played the entire match. On 29 August he played in the third round in a 3–2 away defeat against Reggiana. On 22 September, Bianco made his Serie B debut for Piacenza in a 1–0 away defeat against Treviso, he played the entire match. On 20 October he scored his first goal for Piacenza in the 60th minute of a 3–1 away defeat against Pisa. Bianco ended his loan to Piacenza with 15 appearances and 1 goal.

==== 2008–09 season: Loan to Bari ====
On 1 July, Bianco was loaned out to Serie B side A.S. Bari on a season-long loan deal, coached at the time by Juventus legend, Antonio Conte. On 16 August, Bianco made his debut for Bari in a 2–0 home win over Bassano Virtus in the second round of Coppa Italia, he played the entire match. On 23 August he played in the third round in a 1–0 away defeat against Ascoli. On 7 September he made his Serie B debut for Bari as a substitute replacing Emanuel Rivas in the 73rd minute of a 0–0 away draw against Frosinone. On 20 September, Bianco played his first entire match in Serie B for Bari, a 2–1 away win over Vicenza. Bianco ended his season-long loan to Bari with 24 appearances and 1 assist. At the end of the season Bianco helped Bari win the Serie B championship.

==== 2009–10 season: Loan to Modena ====
On 30 June, Bianco returned to Juventus but was immediately loaned out to Serie B club Modena F.C. on a season-long loan deal. On 9 August, Bianco made his debut for Modena in a 4–2 defeat at penalties after a 2–2 home draw against Novara, he was replaced by Mattia Spezzani in the 78th minute. On 29 August, Bianco made his Serie B debut for Modena in a 2–1 home defeat against Ascoli, he played the entire match. Bianco ended his season-long loan to Modena with 33 appearances, including 26 as a starter.

==== 2010–11 season: Loan to Benevento ====
Following a return to Juventus once more in July 2010, Bianco was not called up to the pre-season training camp under new coach Luigi Delneri and Bianco was sent out on loan to Serie C side Benevento Calcio on 22 July, though he also signed a new 3-year contract with Juventus lasting until 30 June 2013. On 5 September, Bianco made his Serie C debut for Benevento in a 1–1 home draw against Nocerina, he played the entire match. He made 26 appearances for the club, including 24 as a starter, and on 23 June, Bianco was hired back permanently by Juventus after Benevento announced that they did not wish to sign him outright.

=== Spezia ===
==== 2011–12 season ====
On 7 July 2011 he moved to Spezia in co-ownership deal. On 14 August 2011, Bianco made his debut for Spezia as a substitute replacing Davide Marchini in the 31st minute of a 1–0 away defeat against Bari in the second round of Coppa Italia. On 4 September, Bianco made his Serie B debut for Spezia in a 0–0 home draw against Andria, he was replaced by Daniele Buzzegoli in the 62nd minute. On 25 September, Bianco played his first entire match for Spezia, a 3–1 away defeat against Siracusa. On 23 October he scored his first goal for Spezia in the 37th minute of a 2–1 away defeat against Carrarese. Bianco ended this season with 27 matches and scored 1 goal for the Serie C side, helping them gain promotion into Serie B for the 2012-13 season before returning to Juventus on 21 June 2012.

=== Return to Juventus ===
==== 2012–13 season: Loan to Carpi ====
Following his return to Juventus, the player was sent on loan to Carpi F.C. in the Lega Pro Prima Divisione. He transferred on a season-long loan deal with an option to make the move permanent in July 2013. On 2 September, Bianco made his debut in Serie C for Carpi in a 1–0 away win over Trapani, he played the entire match. On 10 February he was sent off with a double yellow card in the 83rd minute of a 2–0 home defeat against Südtirol. Bianchi played all the matches in the play-off and he helped Carpi to win promotion to Serie B. Bianchi ended his loan to Carpi with 27 appearances, including 26 as a starter. At the end of the season he was suspended for 6 month.

=== Carpi ===
==== 2013–14 season ====
On 16 January, Bianco was signed by Serie B club Carpi on a free transfer and a 1-and-half-year contract. On 25 January, Bianco made his debut in Serie B for Carpi as a substitute replacing Filippo Porcari in the 86th minute of a 2–1 home defeat against Ternana. On 1 March, Bianco played his first match as a starter in Serie B for Carpi, a 2–0 away win over Brescia, he was replaced by Boadu Maxwell Acosty in the 71st minute. On 29 March he played his first entire match in Serie B for Carpi, a 1–0 away defeat against Latina. Bianco ended his first season to Carpi with 15 appearances and 1 assist.

==== 2014–15 season ====
Bianco started the new season on 17 August in a 2–1 away defeat against Pisa in the second round of Coppa Italia, he was replaced by Massimiliano Gatto in the 83rd minute. On 30 August, Bianco played his first Serie B match of the season, a 1–1 away draw against Livorno, he was replaced by Emanuele Suagher in the 89th minute. On 22 October he scored his first goal for Carpi in the 46th minute of a 2–1 away win over Spezia. On 25 October he played his first entire match of the season, a 5–0 away win over Pescara. On 28 October he scored his second goal in the 9th minute of a 3–1 home win over Ternana. On 22 November he was sent off with a double yellow card in the 62nd minute of a 3–3 away draw against Brescia. On 9 March he signed a contract with Carpi until 2018. Bianco helped Carpi to win the Serie B championship and reach to promotion in Serie A. He ended his second season to Carpi with 37 appearances, including 35 as a starter, 2 goals and 4 assists.

==== 2015–16 season ====
Bianco started this season on 13 September with his debut in Serie A in a 2–2 away draw against Palermo, he was replaced by Andrea Lazzari in the 82nd minute. On 26 September he played his first entire match of the season, a 5–1 away defeat against Roma. On 13 January he played in a 2–1 away defeat against Milan in the quarter-finals of Coppa Italia, he was replaced in the 46th minute by Matteo Mancosu. On 2 February, Bianco was sent off with a double yellow card 56th minute of a 1–0 away defeat against Napoli. On 13 March he scored his first goal of the season in the 27th minute of a 2–1 home win over Frosinone. At the end of the season Carpi was relegated in Serie B and Bianco ended his third season with 27 appearances, 1 goal and 2 assists.

==== 2016–17 season ====
Bianco played his first match of 2016–17 season on 27 August in a 2–0 away win over Vicenza and he scored his first goal of the season in the 68th minute, he was replaced by Matteo Fedele in the 83rd minute. On 9 September he played his first entire match of the season, a 1–0 away defeat against Cesena. On 24 September he scored his second goal in the 70th minute of a 2–1 home win over Virtus Entella. On 5 February, Bianco scored his third goal in the 65th minute of a 2–1 home defeat against Cesena. On 6 May he scored his fourth goal in the 73rd minute of a 2–0 home win over Salernitana. At the end of the season Carpi reached the play-off final but they were defeat by Benevento. Bianco ended his fourth season to Carpi with 40 appearances(33 as a starter), 4 goals and 2 assists.

=== Perugia ===
==== 2017–18 season ====
On 4 August, Bianco was signed by Serie B club Perugia with an undisclosed fee and a 2-year contract. On 6 August he made his debut for Perugia as a substitute replacing Yanik Frick in the 51st minute of a 2–1 home win over Gubbio in the second round of Coppa Italia. On 3 September, Bianco made his Serie B debut for Perugia in a 4–2 home win over Pescara, he was replaced by Simone Emmanuello in the 81st minute. On 11 September he played his first entire match for Perugia in Serie B, a 1–1 away draw against Cittadella. On 30 November he scored his first goal for Perugia in the 55th minute of an 8–3 away defeat against Udinese, in the fourth round of Coppa Italia, he played the entire match.

=== Return to Bari ===
On 2 September 2019, he re-joined Bari.

=== Cerignola ===
On 1 September 2022, Bianco moved to Audace Cerignola.

== Honours ==
Juventus Primavera

- Campionato Nazionale Primavera: 2005–06
- Coppa Nazionale Primavera: 2006–07
- Supercoppa Primavera: 2007

Juventus

- Serie B: 2006–07

Bari

- Serie B: 2008–09

Spezia

- Serie C: 2011–12

Carpi

- Serie B: 2014–15

Bari

- Serie C: 2021–22 (Group C)
