= Cristian Zaccardo =

Italian footballer (born 1981)

Personal information
- Full name: Cristian Zaccardo
- Date of birth: 21 December 1981 (age 44)
- Place of birth: Formigine, Italy
- Height: 1.84 m (6 ft 0 in)
- Positions: Defender; midfielder

Youth career
- 1991–2000: Bologna

Senior career*
Years	Team	Apps	(Gls)
2000–2004	Bologna	79	(2)
2000–2001	→ Spezia (loan)	28	(0)
2004–2008	Palermo	142	(8)
2008–2009	VfL Wolfsburg	15	(1)
2009–2013	Parma	118	(10)
2013–2015	AC Milan	15	(1)
2015–2017	Carpi	27	(1)
2016–2017	→ Vicenza (loan)	24	(0)
2017	Vicenza	0	(0)
2017–2018	Ħamrun Spartans	15	(3)
2019	Tre Fiori	17	(1)
Total		480	(27)

International career
2002–2004	Italy U21	21	(2)
2004–2007	Italy	17	(1)
Medal record
Association football
Representing Italy
FIFA World Cup
Winner	2006 Germany
UEFA European Under-21 Championship
Winner	2004 Germany
- * Club domestic league appearances and goals

Cristian Zaccardo Ufficiale OMRI (Italian pronunciation: [ˈkristjan dzakˈkardo]; born 21 December 1981) is an Italian former footballer who played as a defender. He mainly played as a centre back, although he was also capable of playing as a full-back or in midfield.

He began his club career with Italian club Bologna in 2000, and remained with the club until 2004, aside from a loan spell with Spezia. He subsequently moved to Palermo, where he came to prominence during his four seasons at the club. In 2008, he moved to German club VfL Wolfsburg for a season, where he won the 2008–09 Bundesliga title. He returned to Italy the following season, joining Parma, and in 2013 he moved to AC Milan, before joining Carpi in 2015; he spent the 2016–17 season on loan with Vicenza in Serie B. In October 2017, he joined Maltese Premier League side Ħamrun Spartans. In January 2019, he signed with San Marinese club Tre Fiori, where he won the Coppa Titano, before announcing his retirement in July.

At international level, he represented the Italy national football team on 17 occasions between 2004 and 2007, scoring one goal; he was a member of the Italian side that won the 2006 FIFA World Cup.

== Club career ==
A product of the Bologna youth system, Zaccardo was promoted to the first team in 2000, but was sent on loan to Spezia for the 2000–01 season. He made his debut in Serie A and for the Bologna first team on 18 October 2001, in a 1–0 away defeat against Lecce, under the direction of coach Francesco Guidolin; he subsequently immediately became a regular for the rossoblu and Italy's under-21 national team. He left Bologna in 2004 to join his former coach Guidolin in Palermo. He was a regular starter for Palermo, and made his breakthrough with the club, appearing in 142 league matches and scoring eight goals.

After a season spent in Germany at VfL Wolfsburg, in which he helped the club to its first ever Bundesliga title, he rejoined Guidolin at Parma in August 2009. In his three-and-a-half seasons with the side, Zaccardo appeared in 118 league matches and scored ten goals.

On 24 January 2013, Zaccardo was signed by AC Milan, part of a cashless swap in which Djamel Mesbah moved to Parma. Towards the end of the 2014 summer transfer window, Milan had a deal in place with Parma in which him and Jonathan Biabiany would swap clubs, but the former refused the move. On 1 February 2015, Zaccardo scored his first goal for Milan in a 3–1 home win against Parma.

On the expiration of his Milan contract in the summer of 2015, Zaccardo moved to recently promoted Serie A side Carpi on a free transfer. He signed a two-year contract. He made 27 appearances for the club during the 2015–16 Serie A season, scoring one goal, although Carpi were ultimately relegated to Serie B at the end of the season.

On 31 August 2016, Zaccardo was signed by fellow Serie B club Vicenza Calcio on loan with an obligation to buy. According to La Gazzetta dello Sport, he signed a two-year contract. He wore the number 9 shirt for the team. On 13 July 2017, he announced that he had cancelled his contract with the club, becoming a free agent.

In October, he was signed by Maltese Premier League side Ħamrun Spartans. On 20 May 2018, he announced that he would be leaving the club, and later became a free agent. In December, he obtained his Sporting Director diploma through the Coverciano Technical Centre.

In January 2019, he stated in an interview that he had been linked with several clubs, including his former team Bologna and Canadian side Toronto FC, and that if he did not receive an offer from a team by May, that he would retire from professional football. On 31 January 2019, Zaccardo announced on facebook that he had signed with San Marinese club Tre Fiori, but that he would be joining the team in March. He won the Coppa Titano with the club. On 9 July 2019, exactly 13 years after he won the World Cup with Italy, he announced his retirement from professional football on Instagram.

== International career ==
Zaccardo represented the Italy under-16 squad (equivalent to the current under-17 team) at the age of 15, also taking part in the 1998 UEFA European Under-16 Championship held in Scotland. During the tournament, he scored the decisive goal in the semi-final which allowed Italy to progress to the final of the tournament, where they were defeated by the Republic of Ireland. In 2001, he was a member of the Italian under-23 team that won a silver medal at the Mediterranean Games held in Tunis. Zaccardo has also represented Italy at under-21 level, winning the 2004 UEFA European Under-21 Championship under manager Claudio Gentile.

Zaccardo made his senior international debut for Italy under Marcello Lippi on 17 November 2004 in Italy's 1–0 home friendly victory over Finland. He began to be deployed with more frequency, and on 8 October 2005, he scored his first and only international goal in a 1–0 home win over Slovenia in Palermo in a 2006 FIFA World Cup qualifying match; the victory allowed Italy to qualify for the upcoming 2006 FIFA World Cup in Germany. Zaccardo was included in Italy's 23-man roster for the tournament, and made three appearances in the final competition. He started the first two matches of the group stage, helping Italy keep a clean sheet in their opening 2–0 win over Ghana on 12 June, but he scored an own goal off an attempted clearance following a free-kick in the azzurri's second match on 17 June, which ended in a 1–1 draw against the United States; this was one of only two goals Italy conceded throughout the tournament. He made one more appearance, his third during the tournament, coming on as a substitute in Italy's 3–0 win over Ukraine in the quarter-finals on 30 June, as Italy went on to win the 2006 World Cup. Due to his mistake during the World Cup, he was often overlooked by the national team since the tournament's conclusion, and only made two more appearances under Roberto Donadoni. He made his final appearance for Italy in a 2–0 friendly win over South Africa on 17 October 2007. In total, Zaccardo made 17 appearances for Italy between 2004 and 2007, scoring one goal.

== Style of play ==
A quick, tactically versatile, and hard-working right-footed footballer, in his prime, Zaccardo was known in particular for his stamina, professionalism, and positional sense as a footballer, as well as his intelligence, versatility, and his strong mental and physical characteristics, which enabled him to play in several positions in defence and midfield along the right flank throughout his career, despite not being the most accurate crosser of the ball. Although he was primarily a right-sided full-back, he was also capable of playing as a wing-back, or in midfield, as a winger, or even as a central or defensive midfielder, a role in which he was also capable of starting attacking plays after winning back possession; during his time at Parma, his manager, Francesco Guidolin, described him as a "centromediano metodista" (a term which was initially used to describe the position of a centre-half-back in the Metodo or 2–3–2–3 formation, but which later became used in Italian football jargon to describe a holding midfielder with both creative and defensive responsibilities), due to his unique playing style in this position, which essentially also saw him act both as a ball-winner and as a deep-lying playmaker in midfield. As he has lost his pace with age in his later career, he has usually been deployed as a centre-back, in both a three or four-man defence, due to his anticipation and ability in the air.

== Personal life ==
Zaccardo is married to Alessia Serafini. Zaccardo and his wife have two children, Niccolò and Ginevra Zaccardo.

Zaccardo has the names of his two children Niccolò and Ginevra tattooed on his left arm, while on his right arm he has a tattoo of his wife Alessia Serafini. On 6 March 2008, Zaccardo became an honorary citizen of Pollina, in the province of Palermo.

== Career statistics ==
=== Club ===
As of 7 September 2023

Club	Season	League			Cup (Note: Includes Coppa Italia, DFB-Ligapokal, DFB-Pokal, DFL-Supercup, and Supercoppa matches.)		Europe (Note: Includes UEFA Supercup, UEFA Intertoto Cup, UEFA Cup, and UEFA Champions League matches.)		Total	
Club	Season	Division	Apps	Goals	Apps	Goals	Apps	Goals	Apps	Goals
Bologna	2001–02	Serie A	19	1	2	0	0	0	21	1
Bologna	2002–03	Serie A	32	1	2	0	6	1	40	2
Bologna	2003–04	Serie A	28	0	2	0	0	0	30	0
Bologna	Total		79	2	6	0	6	1	91	3
Spezia (loan)	2000–01	Serie C	28	0	2	0	0	0	30	0
Spezia (loan)	Total		28	0	2	0	0	0	30	0
Palermo	2004–05	Serie A	35	2	2	0	0	0	37	2
Palermo	2005–06	Serie A	36	0	4	0	4	0	44	0
Palermo	2006–07	Serie A	36	5	1	0	5	1	42	6
Palermo	2007–08	Serie A	35	1	2	0	1	0	38	1
Palermo	Total		142	8	9	0	10	1	161	9
Wolfsburg	2008–09	Bundesliga	14	1	3	0	5	1	22	2
Wolfsburg	2009–10	Bundesliga	1	0	0	0	0	0	1	0
Wolfsburg	Total		15	1	3	0	5	1	23	2
Parma	2009–10	Serie A	34	5	0	0	0	0	34	5
Parma	2010–11	Serie A	34	3	2	0	0	0	36	3
Parma	2011–12	Serie A	35	1	2	0	0	0	37	1
Parma	2012–13	Serie A	15	1	1	0	0	0	16	1
Parma	Total		118	10	5	0	0	0	123	10
Milan	2012–13	Serie A	1	0	0	0	0	0	1	0
Milan	2013–14	Serie A	11	0	1	0	1	0	13	0
Milan	2014–15	Serie A	3	1	0	0	0	0	3	1
Milan	Total		15	1	1	1	0	0	17	1
Carpi	2015–16	Serie A	27	1	2	0	0	0	29	1
Vicenza	2016–17	Serie B	24	0	0	0	—	—	24	0
Ħamrun Spartans	2017–18	Maltese Premier League	15	3	0	0	—	—	15	3
Tre Fiori	2018–19	Campionato Sammarinese di Calcio	17	1	3	1	—	—	20	2
Career total			480	27	31	1	22	3	533	31

=== International ===
Italy national team
Year	Apps	Goals
2004	1	0
2005	9	1
2006	6	0
2007	1	0
Total	17	1

==== International goal ====
Scores and results list Italy's goal tally first.

No	Date	Venue	Opponent	Score	Result	Competition
1.	8 October 2005	Stadio Renzo Barbera, Palermo, Italy	Slovenia	1–0	1–0	2006 FIFA World Cup qualification

== Honours ==
=== Club ===
VfL Wolfsburg

- Bundesliga: 2008–09

Tre Fiori

- Coppa Titano: 2018–19

=== International ===
Italy U-21

- UEFA European Under-21 Championship: 2004

Italy

- FIFA World Cup: 2006

=== Orders ===
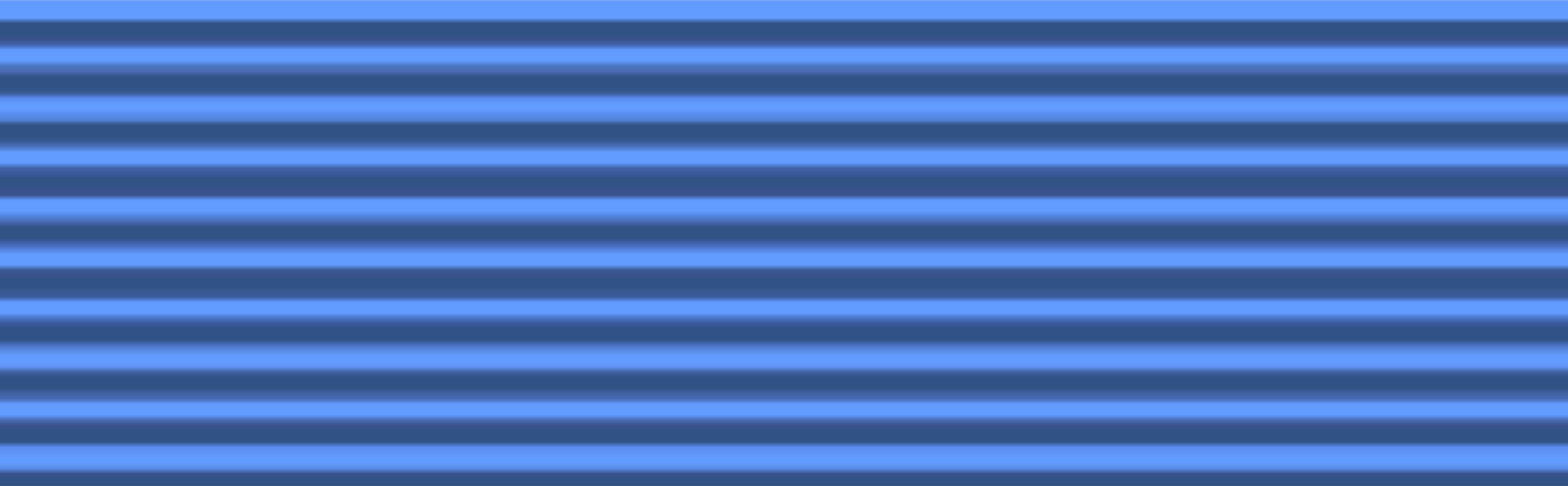

CONI: Golden Collar of Sports Merit: Collare d'Oro al Merito Sportivo: 2006

4th Class / Officer: Ufficiale Ordine al Merito della Repubblica Italiana: 2006
