= Lorenzo Pasciuti =

Italian footballer

Personal information
- Date of birth: 24 September 1989 (age 37)
- Place of birth: Carrara, Italy
- Height: 1.72 m (5 ft 8 in)
- Position: Winger

Team information
- Current team: Grosseto

Youth career
- 2007–2008: AlbinoLeffe

Senior career*
Years	Team	Apps	(Gls)
2006–2008	Massese	2	(0)
2008–2009	Biellese	24	(8)
2009	Pisa	9	(0)
2009–2019	Carpi	238	(21)
2019–2022	Carrarese	73	(4)
2022–	Grosseto	1	(0)
- * Club domestic league appearances and goals as of 18 December 2022

Lorenzo Pasciuti (born 24 September 1989) is an Italian footballer who plays as a winger for Serie D club Grosseto.

== Club career ==
Born in Carrara, Pasciuti made his senior debuts with Massese in Serie C1. After being sparingly used in his two-year spell he joined Biellese in Serie D.

Pasciuti remained in the same division in the following year, appearing with Pisa. In December 2009 he moved to Carpi, also in the fifth level. With the Biancorossi he achieved two promotions, and scored five goals during the 2010–11 season. In the end of 2012–13, he appeared 26 times (22 in the regular season), as his side was promoted to Serie B for the first time ever.

On 24 September 2013 Pasciuti made his division debut, starting in a 0–0 home draw against Brescia. On 10 January of the following year he renewed his link, until 2016; roughly a month later Pasciuti scored his first goal in the second level, netting his side's second of a 4–1 success at Padova. Carpi won the 2014–15 Serie B, gaining promotion to Serie A, meaning Pasciuti had enjoyed four promotions with the club, seeing them rise from the fifth tier of Italian football to the first.

On 13 July 2019, he signed with Carrarese.

On 15 December 2022, Pasciuti moved to Grosseto.

== Career statistics ==
=== Club ===
As of match played 22 December 2021

Appearances and goals by club, season and competition
Club	Season	League			National Cup		League Cup		Other		Total	
Club	Season	Division	Apps	Goals	Apps	Goals	Apps	Goals	Apps	Goals	Apps	Goals
Massese	2006–07	Serie C1	2	0	—		—		—		2	0
Massese	2007–08	Serie C1	0	0	—		—		—		0	0
Massese	Total		2	0	0	0	0	0	0	0	2	0
Biellese	2008–09	Serie D	24	8	—		—		—		24	8
Pisa	2009–10	Serie D	9	0	—		—		—		9	0
Carpi	2009–10	Serie D	12	1	—		—		—		12	1
Carpi	2010–11	Serie C2	28	5	1	0	—		—		29	5
Carpi	2011–12	Serie C1	24	3	0	0	—		4 (Note: Appearance(s) in Promotion Playoffs)	0	28	3
Carpi	2012–13	Serie C1	22	2	3	0	—		4	0	29	2
Carpi	2013–14	Serie B	26	2	1	0	—		—		27	2
Carpi	2014–15	Serie B	34	3	0	0	—		—		34	3
Carpi	2015–16	Serie A	21	2	2	0	—		—		23	2
Carpi	2016–17	Serie B	18	0	2	0	—		1	0	21	0
Carpi	2017–18	Serie B	31	1	2	0	—		—		33	1
Carpi	2018–19	Serie B	22	2	0	0	—		—		22	2
Carpi	Total		238	21	11	0	0	0	9	0	258	21
Carrarese	2019–20	Serie C	20	2	2	0	1	0	2	0	25	2
Carrarese	2020–21	Serie C	27	1	2	0	—		—		29	1
Carrarese	2021–22	Serie C	15	1	0	0	1	0	—		16	1
Carrarese	Total		62	4	4	0	2	0	2	0	70	4
Career total			335	33	15	0	2	0	11	0	0	0
