= Federico Franchini =

Italian football player

Personal information
- Date of birth: 23 January 1994 (age 32)
- Place of birth: Villafranca di Verona, Italy
- Height: 1.84 m (6 ft 1/2 in)
- Position: Midfielder

Team information
- Current team: Villafranca

Youth career
- –2013: Chievo

Senior career*
Years	Team	Apps	(Gls)
2013–2015	Chievo	0	(0)
2013–2014	→ Lumezzane (loan)	21	(0)
2014–2015	→ Lumezzane (loan)	25	(0)
2015–2019	Carpi	0	(0)
2016–2017	→ Maceratese (loan)	29	(0)
2017	→ Fermana (loan)	6	(0)
2018	→ Juve Stabia (loan)	8	(0)
2019	→ Mosta (loan)	7	(0)
2019–	Villafranca	16	(4)

International career
2010	Italy U-16	1	(0)
2010	Italy U-17	5	(0)
- * Club domestic league appearances and goals as of 23:52, 19 December 2019 (UTC)

Federico Franchini (born 23 January 1994) is an Italian football player. He plays for Villafranca.

== Club career ==
He made his Serie C debut for Lumezzane on 1 September 2013 in a game against Pro Vercelli.
