= Stadio Sandro Cabassi =

- Interactive map of Stadio Sandro Cabassi
- Location: Carpi, Italy
- Coordinates: 44°46′32″N 10°52′54″E
- Owner: comunale of Carpi
- Capacity: 5,500

Construction
- Opened: 1928
- Renovated: 2012

Tenant
- AC Carpi (1928–2015, 2016–present)

Stadio Sandro Cabassi, is a multi-purpose stadium in Carpi, Italy. It is mainly used mostly for association football matches and hosts the home matches of AC Carpi. The stadium has a capacity of 5,510 spectators.

== History ==
The Stadio Sandro Cabassi opened in 1928 and has played host to AC Carpi. After Carpi's Serie A promotion for the 2015–16 season, they played in Modena FC's Stadio Alberto Braglia in order to follow minimum capacity rules in Serie A. Following their relegation after the season concluded, they moved back.

In the 2013–14 season, Stadio Sandro Cabassi hosted Serie B football for the first time. The first Serie B match saw Carpi lose 0–2 to Empoli FC with an attendance of 2,363.

== Stands ==
Stand	Capacity
Tribuna centrale	467
Tribuna biancorossa	508
Tribuna azzurra	478
Curva ovest	1880
Curva est	689
Distinti	1334
Disability section	22 + 22 for carers
Total	5,500
