= Diogo Figueiras =

Portuguese footballer (born 1991)

Personal information
- Full name: Diogo José Rosário Gomes Figueiras
- Date of birth: 1 July 1991 (age 35)
- Place of birth: Castanheira do Ribatejo, Portugal
- Height: 1.71 m (5 ft 7 in)
- Position: Right-back

Youth career
- 1999–2004: Vilafranquense
- 2004–2010: Benfica

Senior career*
Years	Team	Apps	(Gls)
2010–2011	Pinhalnovense	25	(0)
2011–2013	Paços Ferreira	21	(0)
2012	→ Moreirense (loan)	9	(0)
2013–2016	Sevilla	50	(2)
2015	→ Genoa (loan)	9	(1)
2016–2018	Olympiacos	36	(2)
2018–2021	Braga	6	(0)
2019–2020	→ Rio Ave (loan)	18	(0)
2021–2022	Famalicão	34	(0)
2024	Inter Sevilla	8	(0)
2025	Penya Encarnada	12	(0)
2025–2026	FAS	17	(1)

International career
2011	Portugal U20	1	(0)
- * Club domestic league appearances and goals as of 20:11, 13 February 2026 (UTC)

Diogo José Rosário Gomes Figueiras (born 1 July 1991) is a Portuguese professional footballer who plays as a right-back.

== Club career ==
=== Early years ===
Born in Castanheira do Ribatejo e Cachoeiras, Vila Franca de Xira, Figueiras spent six years in S.L. Benfica's youth system after starting off at local U.D. Vilafranquense. He made his senior debut in the 2010–11 season, on loan at C.D. Pinhalnovense in the third division, which he helped to reach the quarter-finals of the Taça de Portugal.

=== Paços de Ferreira ===
Figueiras joined F.C. Paços de Ferreira in the Primeira Liga in the summer of 2011, signing a three-year contract. He played his first game in the competition on 28 August, a 0–0 away draw against C.D. Feirense in which he was sent off. In the following transfer window, he was loaned to Moreirense F.C. of Segunda Liga.

Figueiras returned to Paços for the 2012–13 campaign, contributing 19 games in 1,665 minutes of action as the club finished a best-ever third and qualified for the UEFA Champions League for the first time in its history.

=== Sevilla ===
On 18 July 2013, Figueiras moved abroad, penning a four-year deal with Sevilla FC in Spain. He made his La Liga debut on 28 September, playing the full 90 minutes in a 1–1 draw at Real Sociedad. In late December, he was handed a four-game ban after calling the referee a "son of a bitch" during a 0–2 home loss against Racing de Santander for the Copa del Rey (2–1 aggregate defeat).

Figueiras scored his first goal as a senior on 16 March 2014, starting and netting his team's last in a 4–1 home win over Real Valladolid. On 27 April, he was sent off in a 3–1 defeat away to Athletic Bilbao. He played 12 matches of their victorious campaign in the UEFA Europa League, coming on late in extra time of the final, a penalty shootout victory over Benfica in Turin; the Andalusians went on to retain their continental crown, but he did not enter the field in the decisive game against FC Dnipro Dnipropetrovsk.

On 9 July 2015, Figueiras was loaned to Genoa CFC of Serie A, with the option to buy. He totalled ten appearances for the team, scoring to open a 1–2 home defeat to Carpi FC 1909 on 29 November. His loan was cut short the following 30 January, with Sevilla manager Unai Emery needing cover for the injured Marco Andreolli.

=== Olympiacos ===
On 25 May 2016, Figueiras signed a three-year contract with Olympiacos F.C. for a fee of €1.5 million. He joined compatriot Marco Silva (manager) at the Greek champions.

Figueiras scored once from 24 appearances in his first season (all starts), helping the club win the Super League for the seventh time in a row.

=== Braga ===
Figueiras returned to Portugal on 30 January 2018, joining S.C. Braga on a three-and-a-half-year deal worth €1.2 million. Deemed surplus to requirements by manager Abel Ferreira shortly after his arrival, he was later demoted to the reserve team.

On 30 August 2019, Figueiras was loaned to fellow top-flight side Rio Ave F.C. for the season. He played just over half of the games for the Vilacondenses who finished a joint-best fifth with a record points tally, and was sent off on 17 June at the end of a 2–1 home loss to Benfica for alleging that the referee had been bribed; he was given a two-match ban for this statement.

=== Famalicão ===
Figueiras signed a one-and-a-half-year contract with F.C. Famalicão on 21 January 2021, after severing his ties with Braga.

== International career ==
On 8 February 2011, Figueiras earned his only cap for the Portugal under-20s, as a late substitute in a 1–1 draw with Norway in Rio Maior in preparation for the summer's FIFA World Cup.

== Personal life ==
Figueiras' father, Rosário (born 1965), played as a left winger. He made 83 top-flight appearances and scored 16 goals for S.C.U. Torreense, Vitória de Setúbal, Boavista F.C. and F.C. Felgueiras in the 1990s.

== Career statistics ==
As of 26 August 2018

Club	Season	League			Cup		League Cup		Europe		Other		Total	
Club	Season	Division	Apps	Goals	Apps	Goals	Apps	Goals	Apps	Goals	Apps	Goals	Apps	Goals
Pinhalnovense	2010–11	Segunda Divisão	25	0	6	0	—		—		—		31	0
Paços Ferreira	2011–12	Primeira Liga	2	0	0	0	1	0	—		—		3	0
Paços Ferreira	2012–13	Primeira Liga	19	0	4	0	1	0	—		—		24	0
Paços Ferreira	Total		21	0	4	0	2	0	—		—		27	0
Moreirense (loan)	2011–12	LigaPro	9	0	—		1	0	—		—		10	0
Sevilla	2013–14	La Liga	22	1	1	0	—		12 (Note: Appearances in UEFA Europa League)	0	—		35	1
Sevilla	2014–15	La Liga	24	1	5	1	—		8	0	1 (Note: Appearance in UEFA Super Cup)	0	38	2
Sevilla	2015–16	La Liga	4	0	0	0	—		1	0	—		5	0
Sevilla	Total		50	2	6	1	—		21	0	1	0	78	3
Genoa (loan)	2015–16	Serie A	9	1	1	0	—		—		—		10	1
Olympiacos	2016–17	Super League Greece	24	1	7	1	—		12 (Note: Two appearances in UEFA Champions League, ten appearances and one goal in UEFA Europa League)	1	—		43	3
Olympiacos	2017–18	Super League Greece	12	1	5	0	—		7 (Note: Appearances in UEFA Champions League)	0	—		24	1
Olympiacos	Total		36	2	12	1	—		19	1	—		67	4
Braga	2017–18	Primeira Liga	3	0	—		—		1	0	—		4	0
Braga	2018–19	Primeira Liga	3	0	—		—		1	0	—		4	0
Career total			156	5	29	2	3	0	42	1	1	0	231	8

== Honours ==
Sevilla

- UEFA Europa League: 2013–14, 2014–15, 2015–16
- UEFA Super Cup runner-up: 2014

Olympiacos

- Super League Greece: 2016–17
