= Riccardo Gagliolo =

Footballer (born 1990)

Personal information
- Date of birth: 28 April 1990 (age 36)
- Place of birth: Imperia, Italy
- Height: 1.80 m (5 ft 11 in)
- Positions: Left back; centre-back

Youth career
- 1994–2007: Sanremese

Senior career*
Years	Team	Apps	(Gls)
2007–2009	Andora		
2009–2011	Sanremese	23	(1)
2011–2012	Pro Imperia	16	(0)
2012–2018	Carpi	136	(10)
2017–2018	→ Parma (loan)	37	(5)
2018–2021	Parma	95	(5)
2021–2022	Salernitana	17	(0)
2022–2023	Reggina	30	(2)
2023–2024	AEK Larnaca	6	(0)
2024–2025	Ascoli	20	(0)

International career^{‡}
2019	Sweden	1	(0)
- * Club domestic league appearances and goals as of 27 April 2025 ‡ National team caps and goals as of 20:53, 18 November 2019 (UTC)

Riccardo Gagliolo (Italian pronunciation: [ɡaʎˈʎɔːlo]; born 28 April 1990) is a professional footballer who plays as a left back. Born in Italy to an Italian father and a Swedish mother, he won one cap for the Sweden national team in 2019.

== Club career ==
Gagliolo made his senior debuts with Andora Calcio in the Eccellenza Liguria. In summer 2010, he joined Sanremese. In November 2011, he moved to Pro Imperia in Serie D.

In the summer of 2012, Gagliolo joined Carpi after a trial. On 3 July 2013, he signed a new deal with the club extending until 2017.

On 24 August 2013, Gagliolo made his Serie B debut, starting in a 1–0 loss at Ternana; he scored his first goal on 29 December, the only goal of the game in a home win over Juve Stabia.

On 24 July 2022, Gagliolo moved to Reggina on a multi-year contract.

== International career ==
Gagliolo's mother was Swedish. He has a Swedish passport and has expressed a wish to play for the Sweden national team, specifically with Zlatan Ibrahimović. On 2 October 2019, Gagliolo was first called up to Sweden's UEFA Euro 2020 qualifying games against Malta and Spain. Gagliolo made his international debut starting and playing the full game for Sweden in a 3–0 win against the Faroe Islands in the last game of the Euro 2020 qualifying stage.

== Personal life ==
Riccardo Gagliolo was born in Imperia, Italy to an Italian father and a Swedish mother from Sundsvall. Gagliolo understands the Swedish language well but has said that he struggles to speak it himself. His mother Eva eventually moved back to Sweden where she died after a long illness in spring 2020 as Gagliolo was stuck in Italy due to the COVID-19 pandemic. His maternal grandfather played football for Essviks AIF, near Sundsvall.

== Career statistics ==
=== Club ===
As of match played 22 August 2023.

Appearances and goals by club, season and competition
Club	Season	League			Cup (Note: Includes Coppa Italia, Coppa Italia Serie C, Cypriot Cup)		Continental		Other		Total	
Club	Season	Division	Apps	Goals	Apps	Goals	Apps	Goals	Apps	Goals	Apps	Goals
Sanremese	2010–11	Lega Pro 2	23	1	0	0	–		2 (Note: Appearance(s) in Lega Pro/Serie C play-off)	0	25	1
Carpi	2012–13	Lega Pro 1	7	0	2	0	–		4	0	13	0
Carpi	2013–14	Serie B	35	3	1	0	–		–		36	3
Carpi	2014–15	Serie B	34	5	1	0	–		–		35	5
Carpi	2015–16	Serie A	31	1	4	0	–		–		35	1
Carpi	2016–17	Serie B	29	1	2	0	–		3 (Note: Appearance(s) in Serie B play-off)	0	34	1
Carpi	Total		136	10	10	0	0	0	7	0	153	10
Parma	2017–18	Serie B	37	6	0	0	–		–		37	6
Parma	2018–19	Serie A	34	0	1	0	–		–		35	0
Parma	2019–20	Serie A	32	3	3	0	–		–		35	3
Parma	2020–21	Serie A	28	2	2	0	–		–		30	2
Parma	2021–22	Serie B	1	0	1	0	–		–		1	0
Parma	Total		132	11	7	0	0	0	0	0	139	11
Salernitana (loan)	2021–22	Serie A	17	0	1	0	–		–		18	0
Reggina	2022–23	Serie B	30	2	1	0	–		1	0	32	2
AEK Larnaca	2023–24	Cypriot First Division	6	0	1	0	–		–		7	0
Career total			344	24	20	0	0	0	10	0	374	24

=== International ===
As of 17 December 2019

Appearances and goals by national team and year
National team	Year	Apps	Goals
Sweden
Sweden	2019	1	0
Total		1	0
