= Lorenzo Lollo =

Italian footballer

Personal information
- Date of birth: 8 December 1990 (age 35)
- Place of birth: Carrara, Italy
- Height: 1.80 m (5 ft 11 in)
- Position: Midfielder

Team information
- Current team: Siena
- Number: 13

Youth career
- –2008: Spezia
- 2008–2009: Fiorentina

Senior career*
| Years | Team | Apps | (Gls) |
| 2009–2014 | Spezia | 62 | (1) |
| 2013–2014 | → Carpi (loan) | 34 | (2) |
| 2014–2018 | Carpi | 103 | (7) |
| 2017–2018 | → Empoli (loan) | 24 | (1) |
| 2018–2019 | Empoli | 0 | (0) |
| 2019 | → Padova (loan) | 13 | (0) |
| 2019–2020 | Venezia | 28 | (0) |
| 2020–2022 | Bari | 30 | (0) |
| 2022 | → Legnago (loan) | 16 | (0) |
| 2022 | Reggina | 0 | (0) |
| 2022–2023 | Triestina | 22 | (0) |
| 2023– | Siena | 10 | (0) |
- * Club domestic league appearances and goals as of 17 November 2024

Lorenzo Lollo (born 8 December 1990) is an Italian professional footballer who plays as a central midfielder for Serie D club Siena.

== Club career ==
=== Spezia Calcio ===
Born in Carrara, Lollo made his senior debuts with Spezia in Serie C2, taking part of the squad who was promoted to Serie C1 in the 2009–10 season. In the following two seasons he appeared less than 20 times in each one, also winning another promotion in his second (third at the club).

On 22 September 2012 Lollo made his Serie B debut, starting in a 0–2 home loss against Sassuolo; he scored his first professional goal on 28 March of the following year, netting his side's last of a 2–0 success at Crotone.

=== Carpi ===
On 14 August 2013, Lollo joined fellow second-divisioner Carpi on loan, with a buyout clause. He made 33 appearances in Serie B as Carpi finished 12th.

Following Lollo's successful loan with the Biancorossi during the 2013–14, Carpi exercised their right to purchase Lollo outright.

=== Empoli ===
==== Loan to Padova ====
On 15 January 2019, he joined Padova on loan.

=== Venezia ===
On 19 August 2019, he signed a 2-year contract with Venezia.

=== Bari ===
On 29 September 2020, he moved to Serie C club Bari on a three-year contract. On 27 January 2022, he moved on loan to Legnago.

=== Reggina ===
On 26 July 2022, Lollo joined Reggina.

=== Triestina ===
Lollo appeared once on the bench for Reggina before moving to Triestina on 1 September 2022.
