= Stadio Alberto Braglia =

Italian football stadium

Coordinates: 44°39′13″N 10°55′24″E

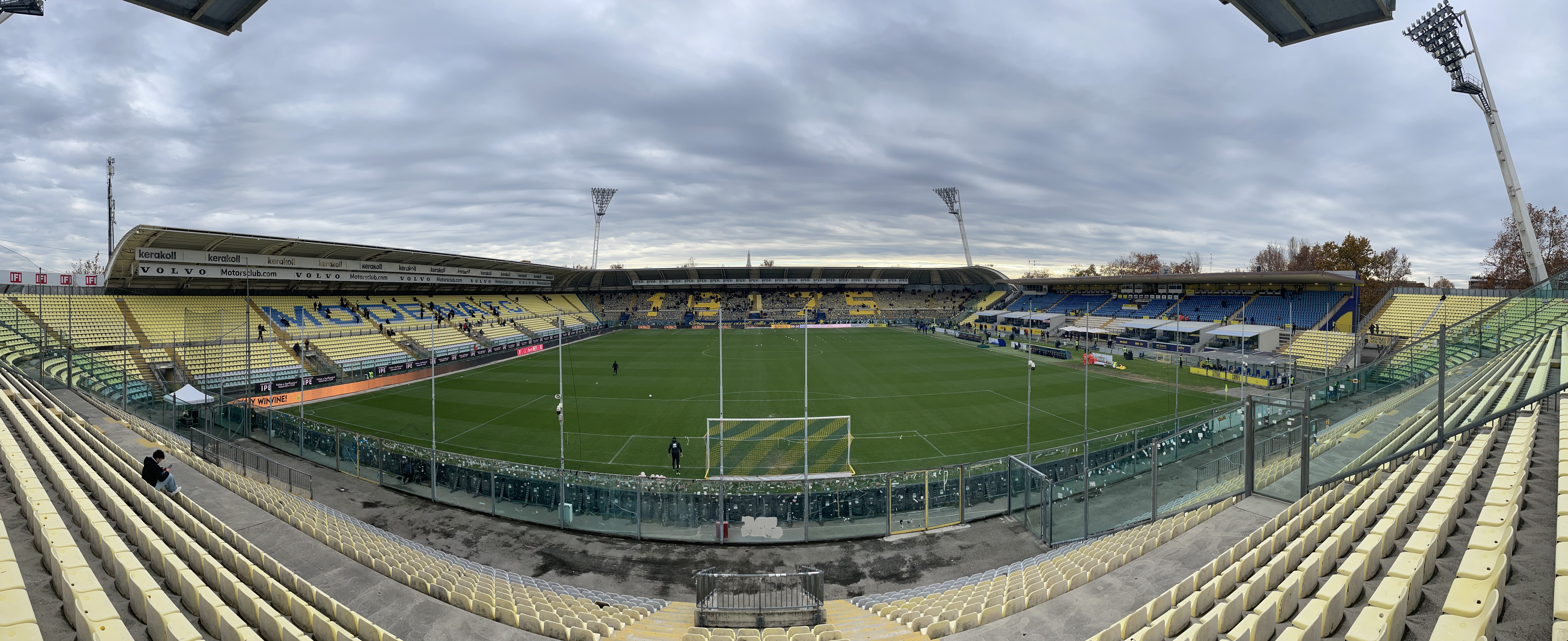
- Overview of the Braglia Stadium in Modena 2025
- Interactive map of Stadio Alberto Braglia
- Location: Modena, Italy
- Owner: Municipality of Modena
- Capacity: 21,092
- Surface: Mixto hybrid grass technology
- Field size: 110 m × 69 m (361 ft × 226 ft)

Construction
- Groundbreaking: 1936
- Opened: 1936

Tenants
- Modena F.C. 2018 (1912–present); Sassuolo (2008–2013); Carpi (2015); Italy national football team (selected matches)

Stadio Alberto Braglia is a football stadium in Modena, Italy. The stadium was built in 1936 and holds 21,092 people.

== History ==
Stadio Alberto Braglia was named after Alberto Braglia who was an Italian gymnast. Artists that have performed at the stadium include Sting, Prince, Simple Minds, U2, Pink Floyd, Guns N' Roses and Rage Against the Machine, among others.

The stadium is currently the home of Modena F.C. 2018 and previously Modena F.C. and Carpi from their promotion to the 2015–16 Serie A season after their Stadio Sandro Cabassi did not meet Serie A capacity rules. The stadium has also been a temporary home to U.S. Sassuolo Calcio from 2008 to 2013 (because their stadium, Stadio Enzo Ricci, didn't meet Serie B stadiums criteria) until the club choose to dispute their home matches at Stadio Città del Tricolore after their first promotion to Serie A.

The stadium held a 2010–11 UEFA Europa League clash between Juventus FC and Shamrock Rovers F.C. in August 2010 .

The stadium held an international rugby union with Italy playing Fiji on 27 November 2010. In 2013, the North Stand was named after the late former Modena player Paolo Ponzo. In 2017, the local Municipality took away the management of the stadium from Modena F.C. This was due to irregularities in payments and a lack of responsibility in managing the stadium. The Caliendo administration left the stadium without necessary requirements for months. Modena started the 2017/18 season in Serie C without a home, forced to play home games in Forlì. The fans decided to boycott the games in opposition to President Caliendo, insisting that he leave Modena and the city.

August 2015

The old natural grass has been changed with the Mixto hybrid grass technology.
