= Jerry Mbakogu =

Nigerian footballer

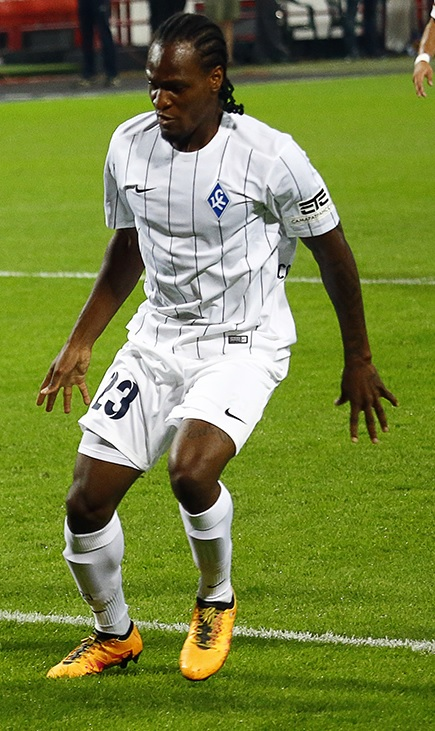
- Mbakogu with Krylia Sovetov in 2016

Personal information
- Full name: Jerry Uche Mbakogu
- Date of birth: 1 October 1992 (age 34)
- Place of birth: Lagos, Nigeria
- Height: 1.85 m (6 ft 1 in)
- Positions: Striker; winger

Team information
- Current team: Sanremese
- Number: 90

Youth career
- 2003–2006: Scorzè Peseggia
- 2006–2010: Padova
- 2009–2010: → Palermo (loan)

Senior career*
| Years | Team | Apps | (Gls) |
| 2010–2014 | Padova | 1 | (0) |
| 2010–2013 | → Juve Stabia (loan) | 71 | (13) |
| 2013–2014 | → Carpi (loan) | 28 | (7) |
| 2014–2018 | Carpi | 92 | (28) |
| 2016 | → Krylia Sovetov (loan) | 7 | (0) |
| 2019 | Padova | 10 | (3) |
| 2019–2020 | Osijek | 7 | (0) |
| 2021 | Cosenza | 6 | (0) |
| 2022 | Apollon Smyrnis | 5 | (0) |
| 2022–2023 | Gubbio | 19 | (4) |
| 2023 | Triestina | 13 | (1) |
| 2023–2024 | Legnago | 13 | (2) |
| 2024–2025 | United Riccione | 9 | (1) |
| 2025 | Costa d'Amalfi | 7 | (1) |
| 2025–2026 | Gela | 14 | (4) |
| 2026– | Sanremese | 11 | (1) |
- * Club domestic league appearances and goals as of 25 June 2026

Jerry Uche Mbakogu (born 1 October 1992) is a Nigerian professional footballer who plays as a striker or winger for Serie D club Sanremese.

== Club career ==
=== Padova ===
Mbakogu was born in Lagos, but moved to Italy at an early age to Scorzè Peseggia. In 2006, aged 14, he joined Padova's youth setup, and progressed through the ranks. In 2009, he was loaned to Palermo and assigned to the Primavera squad.

On 28 August 2010, Mbakogu made his Serie B debut, starting in a 1–1 draw at Crotone.

==== Juve Stabia (loan) ====
Three days after making his debut, he was loaned to Serie B side Juve Stabia. Mbakogu spent three years on loan at Juve Stabia, including winning the Coppa Italia Lega Pro the 2010–11 season, scoring 13 goals in 71 games, before returning to Padova.

==== Carpi (loan) ====
On 2 September 2013, Mbakogu joined Carpi on loan. Mbakogu helped Carpi to their highest ever league finish, scoring seven times in 28 appearances, as the Biancorossi ended the season in 12th.

=== Carpi ===
On 23 July 2014, Mbakogu moved to Carpi in a permanent transfer, signing a five-year contract with the Serie B side. At the end of the 2014–15 season he was named in the Serie B 'Team of the season' after scoring 15 league goals in 30 games helping the club to a historic promotion to Serie A. After promotion, Mbakogu stayed at Carpi, with Carpi competing in Serie A for the 2015–16 season, which saw Mbakogu feature 24 times, scoring twice during the season for the club, with Serie A goals against Sampdoria and Lazio during the season.

==== Krylya Sovetov loan ====
On 10 August 2016, Mbakogu was loaned to Krylya Sovetov in the Russian Premier League on a season-long loan deal, with a deal in place for him to join permanently for 2 million pounds were he to impress over the course of the season. He made his debut on 21 August 2016, in a 0–0 draw against Lokomotiv Moscow. He played a further six times for the side without scoring. After manager Franky Vercauteren was sacked on 1 November 2016, Mbakogu did not play under his successor Vadim Skripchenko before returning to Carpi.

==== Return to Carpi ====
However, in January 2017 Carpi recalled Mbakogu to the club and he returned to training on 1 February 2017, upon his return, he went on to score 5 times in 20 appearances for the club, helping Carpi reach the Serie B playoffs, as they narrowly missed out on promotion at the expense of Benevento to gain promotion to Serie A after losing the two legged playoff final 1–0 on aggregate.

With Carpi performing well in Serie B, and Mbakogu scoring 8 goals in his first 22 games of the season in all competitions during the 2017–18 season, in January 2018, Mbakogu was the subject of interest from English side Leeds United. On 31 January 2018, Leeds United agreed an 'option' with Carpi to sign the player at the end of the 2017–18 season should they wish to execute the right.

He picked up a knee injury for Carpi in February 2018, and was sent to Barcelona for medical treatment on the injury. In May 2018, Carpi President Stefan Bonacini said Leeds had until the 30 June to exercise the option to sign Mbakogu. On 20 June, it was reported that Leeds were negotiating the transfer fee. The transfer to Leeds failed to materialise, and on 6 August Mbakogu was released from his Carpi contract by mutual consent.

=== Return to Padova ===
On 8 January 2019, he returned to his first club Padova until the end of the 2018–19 season. He scored twice on his Padova debut on 20 January in a 3–0 defeat of Verona.

=== Cosenza ===
On 31 January 2021 he joined Serie B club Cosenza.

=== Apollon Smyrnis ===
On 19 February 2022, Mbakogu signed with Apollon Smyrnis in Greece.

=== Later years: minor leagues ===
In the summer of 2022, Mbagoku joined Gubbio who compete in Serie C, Group B.

On 31 January 2023, Mbagoku moved to Triestina, who were bottom of the table in Serie C.

On 7 August 2023, Mbakogu signed a one-year contract with Legnago. After that, he moved down to Serie D, playing for minor teams such as United Riccione, Gela and, since January 2026, Sanremese.

== International career ==
Originally from Nigeria, Mbakogu applied for Italian citizenship for the summer of 2018. He declared he was still wanting to represent the country of his birth Nigeria at international level.

He received Italian citizenship towards the end of April 2018, making him eligible for a European passport and, if he were to change allegiance, the Italy national side.

== Honours ==
Juve Stabia

- Coppa Italia Lega Pro: 2010-2011

Carpi

- Serie B: 2014–15
- Serie B Playoff finalist: 2016–17

Individual

- Serie B Team of the season: 2014–15
