= 2018–19 SSC Napoli season =

Napoli
2018–19 season
- Napoli players during a UEFA Europa League match against Red Bull Salzburg in March 2019
- President: Aurelio De Laurentiis
- Manager: Carlo Ancelotti
- Stadium: Stadio San Paolo
- Serie A: 2nd
- Coppa Italia: Quarter-finals
- UEFA Champions League: Group stage
- UEFA Europa League: Quarter-finals
- Top goalscorer: League: Arkadiusz Milik (17); All: Arkadiusz Milik (20)
- Highest home attendance: 55,489 vs Paris Saint-Germain (6 November 2018, Champions League)
- Lowest home attendance: 14,908 vs Sassuolo (13 January 2019, Coppa Italia)
- Average home league attendance: 29,003
Home colours	Away colours	Third colours

The 2018–19 season was Società Sportiva Calcio Napoli's 73rd season in Serie A. The team has competed in Serie A, and has competed in the Coppa Italia, the UEFA Champions League, and the UEFA Europa League.

Carlo Ancelotti replaced Maurizio Sarri at the helm after three seasons.

== Players ==
=== Squad information ===
Last updated on 25 May 2019
Appearances include league matches only

No.	Name	Nat	Position(s)	Date of birth (age)	Signed from	Signed in	Contract ends	Apps.	Goals
Goalkeepers
1	Alex Meret	(Italy)	GK	22 March 1997 (aged 22)	(Italy) Udinese	2018	2023	14	0
25	David Ospina	(Colombia)	GK	31 August 1988 (aged 30)	(England) Arsenal	2018	2019	17	0
27	Orestis Karnezis	(Greece)	GK	11 July 1985 (aged 33)	(Italy) Udinese	2018	2021	9	0
Defenders
2	Kévin Malcuit	(France)	RB / RM / RW	31 July 1991 (aged 27)	(France) Lille	2018	2022	24	0
6	Mário Rui	(Portugal)	LB	27 May 1991 (aged 28)	(Italy) Roma	2017	2022	45	3
13	Sebastiano Luperto	(Italy)	CB / LB	6 September 1996 (aged 22)	(Italy) Youth Sector	2015		13	0
19	Nikola Maksimović	(Serbia)	CB	25 November 1991 (aged 27)	(Italy) Torino	2016	2021	27	1
21	Vlad Chiricheș	(Romania)	CB	14 November 1989 (aged 29)	(England) Tottenham Hotspur	2015	2022	31	3
23	Elseid Hysaj	(Albania)	RB	2 February 1994 (aged 25)	(Italy) Empoli	2015	2021	134	0
26	Kalidou Koulibaly	(Senegal)	CB	20 June 1991 (aged 28)	(Belgium) Genk	2014	2023	158	10
31	Faouzi Ghoulam	(Algeria)	LB	1 February 1991 (aged 28)	(France) Saint-Étienne	2014	2022	126	3
33	Raúl Albiol	(Spain)	CB	4 September 1985 (aged 33)	(Spain) Real Madrid	2013	2021	178	6
Midfielders
5	Allan	(Brazil)	CM	8 January 1991 (aged 28)	(Italy) Udinese	2015	2023	130	8
8	Fabián Ruiz	(Spain)	CM	3 April 1996 (aged 23)	(Spain) Real Betis	2018	2023	27	5
20	Piotr Zieliński	(Poland)	CM / RW / LW	20 May 1994 (aged 25)	(Italy) Udinese	2016	2021	108	15
42	Amadou Diawara	(Guinea)	DM	17 July 1997 (aged 21)	(Italy) Bologna	2016	2021	49	1
Forwards
7	José Callejón	(Spain)	RW	11 February 1987 (aged 32)	(Spain) Real Madrid	2013	2020	222	60
9	Simone Verdi	(Italy)	AM / LW / RW	12 July 1992 (aged 26)	(Italy) Bologna	2018	2023	22	3
11	Adam Ounas	(Algeria)	RW	11 November 1996 (aged 22)	(France) Bordeaux	2017	2022	25	3
14	Dries Mertens	(Belgium)	CF / ST / LW	6 May 1987 (aged 32)	(Netherlands) PSV Eindhoven	2013	2020	205	84
24	Lorenzo Insigne	(Italy)	LW	4 June 1991 (aged 28)	(Italy) Youth Sector	2009	2022	233	58
34	Amin Younes	(Germany)	AM / LW / RW	6 August 1993 (aged 25)	(Netherlands) Ajax	2018	2023	12	3
99	Arkadiusz Milik	(Poland)	CF / ST	28 February 1994 (aged 25)	(Netherlands) Ajax	2016	2021	64	27
Players transferred during the season
17	Marek Hamšík	(Slovakia)	CM	27 July 1987 (aged 31)	(Italy) Brescia	2007	2020	408	100
30	Marko Rog	(Croatia)	CM	19 July 1995 (aged 23)	(Croatia) Dinamo Zagreb	2016	2021	52	2

== Transfers ==
=== In ===
Date	Pos.	Player	Age	Moving from	Fee	Notes	Source
11 June 2018	FW	(Italy) Simone Verdi	25	(Italy) Bologna	€25M		
1 July 2018	MF	(Italy) Alberto Grassi	23	(Italy) SPAL	Free	Loan return	
1 July 2018	FW	(Italy) Roberto Inglese	26	(Italy) Chievo	Free	Loan return	
1 July 2018	FW	(Italy) Roberto Insigne	24	(Italy) Parma	Free	Loan return	
1 July 2018	DF	(Italy) Sebastiano Luperto	21	(Italy) Empoli	Free	Loan return	
1 July 2018	DF	(Serbia) Nikola Maksimović	26	(Russia) Spartak Moscow	Free	Loan return	
2 July 2018	MF	(Italy) Amato Ciciretti	24	(Italy) Benevento	Free		
5 July 2018	GK	(Italy) Alex Meret	21	(Italy) Udinese	Undisclosed		
5 July 2018	GK	(Greece) Orestis Karnezis	32	(Italy) Udinese	Undisclosed		
5 July 2018	MF	(Spain) Fabián Ruiz	22	(Spain) Real Betis	€30M		
8 August 2018	DF	(France) Kévin Malcuit	27	(France) Lille	Undisclosed		

==== Loans in ====
Date	Pos.	Player	Age	Moving from	Fee	Notes	Source
17 August 2018	GK	(Colombia) David Ospina	29	(England) Arsenal	Loan		

=== Out ===
Date	Pos.	Player	Age	Moving to	Fee	Notes	Source
1 July 2018	GK	(Brazil) Rafael	28	(Italy) Sampdoria	Free	End of contract	
1 July 2018	FW	(Colombia) Duván Zapata	27	(Italy) Sampdoria	€17M	Obligation to buy exercised	
2 July 2018	GK	(Spain) Pepe Reina	35	(Italy) Milan	Free		
4 July 2018	MF	(Italy) Emanuele Giaccherini	33	(Italy) Chievo	Undisclosed	Option to buy exercised	
14 July 2018	MF	(Italy) Jorginho	26	(England) Chelsea	€60M		
14 February 2019	MF	(Slovakia) Marek Hamšík	31	(China) Dalian Yifang	€13M		

==== Loans out ====
Date	Pos.	Player	Age	Moving to	Fee	Notes	Source
9 July 2018	GK	(Italy) Luigi Sepe	27	(Italy) Parma	Loan	Loan with an option to buy and counter-option	
10 July 2018	FW	(Brazil) Leandrinho	19	(Brazil) Atlético Mineiro	Loan		
26 July 2018	MF	(Italy) Amato Ciciretti	24	(Italy) Parma	Loan		
14 August 2018	MF	(Italy) Alberto Grassi	23	(Italy) Parma	Loan		
14 August 2018	FW	(Italy) Roberto Inglese	26	(Italy) Parma	Loan	Loan with an option to buy	
17 August 2018	DF	(Italy) Lorenzo Tonelli	28	(Italy) Sampdoria	€500k	Loan with an option to buy	
29 January 2019	MF	(Croatia) Marko Rog	23	(Spain) Sevilla	Loan		

== Pre-season and friendlies ==
14 July 2018 Friendly	Napoli (Italy)	4–0	(Italy) Gozzano	Dimaro, Italy
16:30 CEST	Fabián 21'; Grassi 62'; Verdi 71' (pen.); Ounas 80'	Report		Stadium: Stadio Comunale; Referee: Paride Tremolada

22 July 2018 Friendly	Napoli (Italy)	5–1	(Italy) Carpi	Trento, Italy
21:00 CEST	Allan 2'; Inglese 39'; Callejón 66'; Verdi 73'; Vinícius 84'	Report	Piu 85'	Stadium: Stadio Briamasco; Referee: Riccardo Ros

29 July 2018 Friendly	Napoli (Italy)	2–0	(Italy) Chievo	Trento, Italy
	Verdi 10'; Tonelli 86'	Report		Stadium: Stadio Briamasco; Referee: Simone Sozza

4 August 2018 Friendly	Liverpool (England)	5–0	(Italy) Napoli	Dublin, Republic of Ireland
19:00 CEST	Milner 4'; Wijnaldum 9'; Salah 58'; Sturridge 73'; Moreno 77'			Stadium: Aviva Stadium; Attendance: 51,512; Referee: Robert Hennessy (Ireland)

7 August 2018 Friendly	Borussia Dortmund (Germany)	1–3	(Italy) Napoli	St. Gallen, Switzerland
	Philipp 65'	Report	Milik 7'; Maksimović 29'; Callejón 90+1'	Stadium: kybunpark Attendance: 13,382; Referee: Nikolaj Hänni (Switzerland)

11 August 2018 Friendly	VfL Wolfsburg (Germany)	3–1	(Italy) Napoli	Wolfsburg, Germany
	Brekalo 43'; Mehmedi 71', 75'	Report	Milik 69'	Stadium: Volkswagen Arena; Referee: Patrick Ittrich (Germany)

== Competitions ==
=== Serie A ===
==== League table ====
Pos	Team	Pld	W	D	L	GF	GA	GD	Pts	Qualification or relegation
1	Juventus (C)	38	28	6	4	70	30	+40	90	Qualification for the Champions League group stage
2	Napoli	38	24	7	7	74	36	+38	79	Qualification for the Champions League group stage
3	Atalanta	38	20	9	9	77	46	+31	69 (Note: Atalanta finished ahead of Internazionale on head-to-head points: Atalanta 4–1 Internazionale, Internazionale 0–0 Atalanta.)	Qualification for the Champions League group stage
4	Inter Milan	38	20	9	9	57	33	+24	69	Qualification for the Champions League group stage
5	Milan (Note: Milan were excluded from UEFA competitions over financial fair play violation.)	38	19	11	8	55	36	+19	68	

Source: Serie A, Soccerway
Rules for classification: 1) Points; 2) Head-to-head points; 3) Head-to-head goal difference; 4) Goal difference; 5) Goals scored; 6) Draw. (Note: Head-to-head record is used only after all the matches between the teams in question have been played).
(C) Champions

==== Results summary ====
Overall								Home						Away					
Pld	W	D	L	GF	GA	GD	Pts	W	D	L	GF	GA	GD	W	D	L	GF	GA	GD
38	24	7	7	74	36	+38	79	13	4	2	41	16	+25	11	3	5	33	20	+13

Last updated: 25 May 2019.
Source: Competitive matches

==== Results by round ====
Round	1	2	3	4	5	6	7	8	9	10	11	12	13	14	15	16	17	18	19	20	21	22	23	24	25	26	27	28	29	30	31	32	33	34	35	36	37	38
Ground	A	H	A	H	A	H	A	H	A	H	H	A	H	A	H	A	H	A	H	H	A	H	A	H	A	H	A	H	A	A	H	A	H	A	H	A	H	A
Result	W	W	L	W	W	W	L	W	W	D	W	W	D	W	W	W	W	L	W	W	D	W	D	D	W	L	D	W	W	L	D	W	L	W	W	W	W	L
Position	4	2	5	3	2	2	2	2	2	3	3	2	2	2	2	2	2	2	2	2	2	2	2	2	2	2	2	2	2	2	2	2	2	2	2	2	2	2

Updated to match(es) played on 25 May 2019. Source: Competitive matches
A = Away; H = Home; W = Win; D = Draw; L = Loss

==== Matches ====
18 August 2018 1	Lazio	1–2	Napoli	Rome
20:30 CEST (UTC+02:00)	Immobile 25'	Report	Milik 45+2'; Insigne 59'	Stadium: Stadio Olimpico; Attendance: 38,764; Referee: Luca Banti

25 August 2018 2	Napoli	3–2	Milan	Naples
20:30 CEST (UTC+02:00)	Insigne (yellow card) 30'; Zieliński 53', 67'; Mertens 80'; Koulibaly (yellow card) 90+2'	Report	Bonaventura 15'; Suso (yellow card) 31'; Calabria 49'; Rodríguez (yellow card) 66'	Stadium: Stadio San Paolo; Attendance: 34,474; Referee: Paolo Valeri

2 September 2018 3	Sampdoria	3–0	Napoli	Genoa
20:30 CEST (UTC+02:00)	Defrel 11', 32'; Ramírez (yellow card) 40'; Quagliarella 75'; Vieira (yellow card) 88'	Report	Diawara (yellow card) 68'; Mário Rui (yellow card) 77'; Allan (yellow card) 81'; Rog (yellow card) 83'	Stadium: Stadio Luigi Ferraris; Attendance: 19,835; Referee: Davide Massa

15 September 2018 4	Napoli	1–0	Fiorentina	Naples
18:00 CEST (UTC+02:00)	Zieliński (yellow card) 39'; Insigne 79'	Report	Chiesa (yellow card) 34'; Benassi (yellow card) 43'; Dabo (yellow card) 75'; Eysseric (yellow card) 90+3'	Stadium: Stadio San Paolo; Attendance: 20,131; Referee: Michael Fabbri

23 September 2018 5	Torino	1–3	Napoli	Turin
12:30 CEST (UTC+02:00)	Rincón (yellow card) 31'; Izzo (yellow card) 42'; Belotti 51' (pen.)	Report	Insigne 4', 59'; Verdi 20'; Koulibaly (yellow card) 23'; Rog (yellow card) 37'; Albiol (yellow card) 52'	Stadium: Stadio Olimpico Grande Torino; Attendance: 22,655; Referee: Massimiliano Irrati

26 September 2018 6	Napoli	3–0	Parma	Naples
21:00 CEST (UTC+02:00)	Insigne 4'; Milik 47', 85'	Report	Štulac (yellow card) 33'; Alves (yellow card) 50'; Barillà (yellow card) 89'	Stadium: Stadio San Paolo; Attendance: 29,354; Referee: Daniele Doveri

29 September 2018 7	Juventus	3–1	Napoli	Turin
18:00 CEST (UTC+02:00)	Mandžukić 26', 49'; Bonucci (yellow card) 60', (goal) 76'; Cancelo (yellow card) 69'; Alex Sandro (yellow card) 85'	Report	Mertens 10'; Mário Rui (yellow card) 24' (yellow-red card) 58'; Koulibaly (yellow card) 40'; Hysaj (yellow card) 55'; Insigne (yellow card) 60'	Stadium: Allianz Stadium; Attendance: 39,252; Referee: Luca Banti

7 October 2018 8	Napoli	2–0	Sassuolo	Naples
18:00 CEST (UTC+02:00)	Ounas 3'; Diawara (yellow card) 42'; Insigne 72'; Koulibaly (yellow card) 82'	Report	Locatelli (yellow card) 38'; Rogério (red card) 87'; Consigli (yellow card) 90'	Stadium: Stadio San Paolo; Attendance: 29,647; Referee: Marco Di Bello

20 October 2018 9	Udinese	0–3	Napoli	Udine
20:30 CEST (UTC+02:00)	Pussetto (yellow card) 15'; Stryger Larsen (yellow card) 57'; Opoku (yellow card) 79'	Report	Fabián 14'; Milik (yellow card) 36'; Albiol (yellow card) 45'; Allan (yellow card) 56'; Mertens (yellow card) 59', (goal) 82' (pen.); Rog 86'	Stadium: Dacia Arena; Attendance: 21,449; Referee: Maurizio Mariani

28 October 2018 10	Napoli	1–1	Roma	Naples
20:30 CET (UTC+01:00)	Mertens 90'	Report	El Shaarawy 14'; Džeko (yellow card) 55'; Nzonzi (yellow card) 58'; Manolas (yellow card) 68'; Olsen (yellow card) 80'; Lo. Pellegrini (yellow card) 80'	Stadium: Stadio San Paolo; Attendance: 30,037; Referee: Davide Massa

2 November 2018 11	Napoli	5–1	Empoli	Naples
20:30 CET (UTC+01:00)	Insigne 9'; Mertens 38', 64', 90+3'; Milik 90'	Report	Bennacer (yellow card) 42'; Caputo 58'; Di Lorenzo (yellow card) 86'	Stadium: Stadio San Paolo; Attendance: 31,370; Referee: Luca Pairetto

10 November 2018 12	Genoa	1–2	Napoli	Genoa
18:00 CET (UTC+01:00)	Kouamé 20'; Bessa (yellow card) 77'; Oméonga (yellow card) 85'; Criscito (yellow card) 87'; Mazzitelli (yellow card) 90+3'	Report	Insigne (yellow card) 45+1'; Fabián 62'; Biraschi 86' (o.g.); Malcuit (yellow card) 90+2'	Stadium: Stadio Luigi Ferraris; Attendance: 25,365; Referee: Rosario Abisso

25 November 2018 13	Napoli	0–0	Chievo	Naples
15:00 CET (UTC+01:00)	Diawara (yellow card) 21'; Mário Rui (yellow card) 84'	Report	Barba (yellow card) 57'; Hetemaj (yellow card) 78'	Stadium: Stadio San Paolo; Attendance: 44,408; Referee: Daniele Chiffi

3 December 2018 14	Atalanta	1–2	Napoli	Bergamo
20:30 CET (UTC+01:00)	Zapata 56'; Masiello (yellow card) 61'	Report	Fabián 2'; Allan (yellow card) 14'; Mário Rui (yellow card) 79'; Milik 85'	Stadium: Stadio Atleti Azzurri d'Italia; Attendance: 19,536; Referee: Piero Giacomelli

8 December 2018 15	Napoli	4–0	Frosinone	Naples
15:00 CET (UTC+01:00)	Zieliński 7', (yellow card) 33'; Ounas 40'; Milik 68', 84'	Report	Cassata (yellow card) 64'; Campbell (yellow card) 90'	Stadium: Stadio San Paolo; Attendance: 34,631; Referee: Gianluca Manganiello

16 December 2018 16	Cagliari	0–1	Napoli	Cagliari
18:00 CET (UTC+01:00)	Padoin (yellow card) 48'; Sau (yellow card) 89'	Report	Maksimović (yellow card) 72'; Insigne (yellow card) 79'; Milik 90+1'	Stadium: Sardegna Arena; Attendance: 15,081; Referee: Daniele Doveri

22 December 2018 17	Napoli	1–0	SPAL	Naples
15:00 CET (UTC+01:00)	Albiol 45+1'; Hamšík (yellow card) 46'; Rog (yellow card) 61'	Report	Cionek (yellow card) 38'; Kurtić (yellow card) 50'	Stadium: Stadio San Paolo; Attendance: 37,093; Referee: Federico La Penna

26 December 2018 18	Internazionale	1–0	Napoli	Milan
20:30 CET (UTC+01:00)	Brozović (yellow card) 29'; Valero (yellow card) 52'; Martínez 90+1', (yellow card) 90+2'	Report	Allan (yellow card) 56'; Albiol (yellow card) 67'; Koulibaly (yellow card) 80' (red card) 81'; Insigne (red card) 90+5'	Stadium: San Siro; Attendance: 63,946; Referee: Paolo Mazzoleni

29 December 2018 19	Napoli	3–2	Bologna	Naples
18:00 CET (UTC+01:00)	Milik 16', 51'; Malcuit (yellow card) 80'; Mertens 88'; Allan (yellow card) 90+4'	Report	Pulgar (yellow card) 25'; Santander 37'; De Maio (yellow card) 46'; Danilo 80'	Stadium: Stadio San Paolo; Attendance: 46,585; Referee: Gianpaolo Calvarese

20 January 2019 20	Napoli	2–1	Lazio	Naples
20:30 CET (UTC+01:00)	Callejón 34'; Milik 37'; Zieliński (yellow card) 88'	Report	Milinković-Savić (yellow card) 20'; Acerbi (yellow card) 36' (yellow-red card) 70'; Immobile 65'; Luis Alberto (yellow card) 87'; Lulić (yellow card) 90+1'	Stadium: Stadio San Paolo; Attendance: 19,448; Referee: Gianluca Rocchi

26 January 2019 21	Milan	0–0	Napoli	Milan
20:30 CET (UTC+01:00)	Cutrone (yellow card) 17'	Report	Fabián (yellow card) 18' (yellow-red card) 90+3'; Albiol (yellow card) 86'	Stadium: San Siro; Attendance: 56,729; Referee: Daniele Doveri

2 February 2019 22	Napoli	3–0	Sampdoria	Naples
18:00 CET (UTC+01:00)	Milik 25'; Insigne 26'; Verdi 89' (pen.)	Report	Jankto (yellow card) 73'; Murru (yellow card) 76'; Andersen (yellow card) 87'	Stadium: Stadio San Paolo; Attendance: 19,455; Referee: Luca Pairetto

9 February 2019 23	Fiorentina	0–0	Napoli	Florence
18:00 CET (UTC+01:00)	Dabo (yellow card) 42'; Veretout (yellow card) 50'	Report	Callejón (yellow card) 54'; Zieliński (yellow card) 57'; Ghoulam (yellow card) 72'; Maksimović (yellow card) 90'	Stadium: Stadio Artemio Franchi; Attendance: 29,377; Referee: Gianpaolo Calvarese

17 February 2019 24	Napoli	0–0	Torino	Naples
20:30 CET (UTC+01:00)	Insigne (yellow card) 45+3'; Koulibaly (yellow card) 60'; Allan (yellow card) 65'; Hysaj (yellow card) 82'; Malcuit (yellow card) 90+4'	Report	Rincón (yellow card) 45+2'; Moretti (yellow card) 59'; Aina (yellow card) 71'	Stadium: Stadio San Paolo; Attendance: 21,830; Referee: Michael Fabbri

24 February 2019 25	Parma	0–4	Napoli	Parma
18:00 CET (UTC+01:00)	Rigoni (yellow card) 28'; Gagliolo (yellow card) 85'	Report	Zieliński 19'; Milik 36', 73', (yellow card) 38'; Ounas 82'	Stadium: Stadio Ennio Tardini; Attendance: 18,478; Referee: Daniele Chiffi

3 March 2019 26	Napoli	1–2	Juventus	Naples
20:30 CET (UTC+01:00)	Meret (red card) 25'; Callejón 61'; Maksimović (yellow card) 77'; Koulibaly (yellow card) 86'; Allan (yellow card) 89'	Report	Pjanić 28', (yellow card) 34' (yellow-red card) 47'; Can 39'; Cancelo (yellow card) 54'; Alex Sandro (yellow card) 83'; Bentancur (yellow card) 89'; Dybala (yellow card) 90+2'	Stadium: Stadio San Paolo; Attendance: 42,667; Referee: Gianluca Rocchi

10 March 2019 27	Sassuolo	1–1	Napoli	Reggio Emilia
18:00 CET (UTC+01:00)	Berardi 52'; Ferrari (yellow card) 61'; Pegolo (yellow card) 68'; Bourabia (yellow card) 87'	Report	Allan (yellow card) 68'; Diawara (yellow card) 80'; Insigne 86'	Stadium: Mapei Stadium – Città del Tricolore; Attendance: 14,969; Referee: Gianluca Manganiello

17 March 2019 28	Napoli	4–2	Udinese	Naples
18:00 CET (UTC+01:00)	Zieliński (yellow card) 11'; Younes 17'; Callejón 26'; Milik 57'; Mertens 69'	Report	Sandro (yellow card) 13'; Lasagna 30'; Fofana 36'	Stadium: Stadio San Paolo; Attendance: 25,718; Referee: Paolo Valeri

31 March 2019 29	Roma	1–4	Napoli	Rome
20:30 CEST (UTC+02:00)	Schick (yellow card) 13'; Manolas (yellow card) 37'; Džeko (yellow card) 37'; Perotti 45+4' (pen.); Kolarov (yellow card) 66'	Report	Milik 2', (yellow card) 43'; Maksimović (yellow card) 17'; Mertens 50'; Verdi 55'; Younes 81'	Stadium: Stadio Olimpico; Attendance: 36,525; Referee: Gianpaolo Calvarese

3 April 2019 30	Empoli	2–1	Napoli	Empoli
19:00 CEST (UTC+02:00)	Farias 28'; Traorè (yellow card) 50'; Di Lorenzo 53'; Pajač (yellow card) 60'	Report	Koulibaly (yellow card) 33'; Zieliński 44'; Milik (yellow card) 47'	Stadium: Stadio Carlo Castellani; Attendance: 10,911; Referee: Daniele Doveri

7 April 2019 31	Napoli	1–1	Genoa	Naples
20:30 CEST (UTC+02:00)	Allan (yellow card) 24'; Mertens 34'; Hysaj (yellow card) 67'	Report	Sturaro (red card) 28'; Lazović 45+3'	Stadium: Stadio San Paolo; Attendance: 22,935; Referee: Fabrizio Pasqua

14 April 2019 32	Chievo	1–3	Napoli	Verona
18:00 CEST (UTC+02:00)	Cesar 90'	Report	Koulibaly 15', 81'; Milik 64'	Stadium: Stadio Marc'Antonio Bentegodi; Attendance: 13,500; Referee: Federico La Penna

22 April 2019 33	Napoli	1–2	Atalanta	Naples
19:00 CEST (UTC+02:00)	Mertens 28'; Hysaj (yellow card) 29'; Koulibaly (yellow card) 71'; Fabián (yellow card) 82'	Report	Mancini (yellow card) 1'; Zapata 69'; Pašalić 80'	Stadium: Stadio San Paolo; Attendance: 19,604; Referee: Daniele Orsato

28 April 2019 34	Frosinone	0–2	Napoli	Frosinone
12:30 CEST (UTC+02:00)	Ghiglione (yellow card) 45'; Gori (yellow card) 80'; Dionisi (yellow card) 81'	Report	Mertens 19'; Younes 49'; Fabián (yellow card) 79'	Stadium: Stadio Benito Stirpe; Attendance: 13,600; Referee: Federico La Penna

5 May 2019 35	Napoli	2–1	Cagliari	Naples
20:30 CEST (UTC+02:00)	Younes (yellow card) 61'; Mertens 85'; Insigne 90+8' (pen.), (yellow card) 90+8'	Report	Pavoletti 63'; Cerri (yellow card) 72'; Cigarini (yellow card) 90+7'; Ioniță (red card) 90+7'; Barella (yellow card) 90+11'	Stadium: Stadio San Paolo; Attendance: 16,171; Referee: Daniele Chiffi

12 May 2019 36	SPAL	1–2	Napoli	Ferrara
18:00 CEST (UTC+02:00)	Cionek (yellow card) 64'; Fares (yellow card) 69'; Petagna 84' (pen.)	Report	Allan 49'; Mário Rui (yellow card) 53', (goal) 88'	Stadium: Stadio Paolo Mazza; Attendance: 14,175; Referee: Eugenio Abbattista

19 May 2019 37	Napoli	4–1	Internazionale	Naples
20:30 CEST (UTC+02:00)	Koulibaly (yellow card) 9'; Zieliński 16'; Allan (yellow card) 49'; Mertens 61'; Fabián 71', 78'; Ghoulam (yellow card) 90+2'	Report	Nainggolan (yellow card) 48'; Icardi 81' (pen.)	Stadium: Stadio San Paolo; Attendance: 25,445; Referee: Daniele Doveri

25 May 2019 38	Bologna	3–2	Napoli	Bologna
20:30 CEST (UTC+02:00)	Santander 43', 88'; Džemaili 45'	Report	Ghoulam 57'; Mertens 78'; Zieliński (yellow card) 79'	Stadium: Stadio Renato Dall'Ara; Attendance: 19,351; Referee: Aleandro Di Paolo

=== Coppa Italia ===
13 January 2019 Round of 16	Napoli	2–0	Sassuolo	Naples
20:45 CET (UTC+01:00)	Milik 15'; Maksimović (yellow card) 34'; Ounas (yellow card) 64'; Mário Rui (yellow card) 71'; Fabián 74'	Report	Berardi (yellow card) 45'; Magnani (yellow card) 45+1'; Locatelli (yellow card) 49'; Peluso (yellow card) 58'	Stadium: Stadio San Paolo; Attendance: 14,908; Referee: Daniele Chiffi

29 January 2019 Quarter-finals	Milan	2–0	Napoli	Milan
20:45 CET (UTC+01:00)	Piątek 11', 27'	Report	Malcuit (yellow card) 29'; Milik (yellow card) 35'; Koulibaly (yellow card) 40'	Stadium: San Siro; Attendance: 22,289; Referee: Piero Giacomelli

=== UEFA Champions League ===
==== Group stage ====
Pos	Team	Pld	W	D	L	GF	GA	GD	Pts	Qualification	PAR	LIV	NAP	RSB
1	(France) Paris Saint-Germain	6	3	2	1	17	9	+8	11	Advance to knockout phase	—	2–1	2–2	6–1
2	(England) Liverpool	6	3	0	3	9	7	+2	9 (Note: Goals in all group matches: Liverpool 9, Napoli 7.)	Advance to knockout phase	3–2	—	1–0	4–0
3	(Italy) Napoli	6	2	3	1	7	5	+2	9	Transfer to Europa League	1–1	1–0	—	3–1
4	(Serbia) Red Star Belgrade	6	1	1	4	5	17	−12	4		1–4	2–0	0–0	—

Source: UEFA
Rules for classification: Group stage tiebreakers
Notes:

18 September 2018 1	Red Star Belgrade (Serbia)	0–0	(Italy) Napoli	Belgrade, Serbia
21:00 CEST (UTC+02:00)	Krstičić (yellow card) 37'; Degenek (yellow card) 55'	Report	Allan (yellow card) 17'; Albiol (yellow card) 57'; Milik (yellow card) 90+2'; Mário Rui (yellow card) 90+5'	Stadium: Red Star Stadium; Attendance: 49,112; Referee: Szymon Marciniak (Poland)

3 October 2018 2	Napoli (Italy)	1–0	(England) Liverpool	Naples, Italy
21:00 CEST (UTC+02:00)	Koulibaly (yellow card) 25'; Insigne 90'	Report	Milner (yellow card) 45+2'	Stadium: Stadio San Paolo; Attendance: 37,057; Referee: Viktor Kassai (Hungary)

24 October 2018 3	Paris Saint-Germain (France)	2–2	(Italy) Napoli	Paris, France
21:00 CEST (UTC+02:00)	Marquinhos (yellow card) 5'; Mário Rui 61' (o.g.); Di María 90+3'; Draxler (yellow card) 90+5'	Report	Mertens (yellow card) 9', (goal) 77'; Insigne 29'; Mário Rui (yellow card) 33'; Callejón (yellow card) 81'; Maksimović (yellow card) 86'; Ospina (yellow card) 90+2'	Stadium: Parc des Princes; Attendance: 46,274; Referee: Felix Zwayer (Germany)

6 November 2018 4	Napoli (Italy)	1–1	(France) Paris Saint-Germain	Naples, Italy
21:00 CET (UTC+01:00)	Fabián (yellow card) 45+3'; Insigne 63' (pen.)	Report	Mbappé (yellow card) 29'; Kehrer (yellow card) 32'; Bernat 45+2'; Verratti (yellow card) 89'; Neymar (yellow card) 90+1'	Stadium: Stadio San Paolo; Attendance: 55,489; Referee: Björn Kuipers (Netherlands)

28 November 2018 5	Napoli (Italy)	3–1	(Serbia) Red Star Belgrade	Naples, Italy
21:00 CET (UTC+01:00)	Hamšík 11'; Mertens 33', 52'; Hysaj (yellow card) 89'	Report	Krstičić (yellow card) 45+3'; Ben Nabouhane 57'; Jovančić (yellow card) 75'; Gobeljić (yellow card) 81'	Stadium: Stadio San Paolo; Attendance: 44,470; Referee: Jesús Gil Manzano (Spain)

11 December 2018 6	Liverpool (England)	1–0	(Italy) Napoli	Liverpool, England
21:00 CET (UTC+01:00)	Van Dijk (yellow card) 13'; Salah 34', (yellow card) 83'; Robertson (yellow card) 90+1'; Mané (yellow card) 90+3'	Report	Koulibaly (yellow card) 40'	Stadium: Anfield; Attendance: 52,015; Referee: Damir Skomina (Slovenia)

=== UEFA Europa League ===
==== Knockout phase ====
===== Round of 32 =====
14 February 2019 First leg	Zürich (Switzerland)	1–3	(Italy) Napoli	Zürich, Switzerland
21:00 CET (UTC+01:00)	Untersee (yellow card) 24'; Kryeziu (yellow card) 59'; Kololli 83' (pen.); Nef (yellow card) 90+3'	Report	Insigne 11'; Callejón 21'; Ghoulam (yellow card) 73'; Zieliński 77'; Diawara (yellow card) 79'; Maksimović (yellow card) 82'	Stadium: Letzigrund; Attendance: 24,000; Referee: Milorad Mažić (Serbia)

21 February 2019 Second leg	Napoli (Italy)	2–0 (5–1 agg.)	(Switzerland) Zürich	Naples, Italy
18:55 CET (UTC+01:00)	Chiricheș (yellow card) 35'; Verdi 43'; Ounas 75'	Report		Stadium: Stadio San Paolo; Attendance: 17,579; Referee: Anastasios Sidiropoulos (Greece)

===== Round of 16 =====
7 March 2019 First leg	Napoli (Italy)	3–0	(Austria) Red Bull Salzburg	Naples, Italy
21:00 CET (UTC+01:00)	Milik 10'; Fabián 18'; Koulibaly (yellow card) 26'; Onguéné 58' (o.g.); Maksimović (yellow card) 82'; Ounas (yellow card) 86'	Report	Schlager (yellow card) 54'	Stadium: Stadio San Paolo; Attendance: 32,579; Referee: Aleksei Kulbakov (Belarus)

14 March 2019 Second leg	Red Bull Salzburg (Austria)	3–1 (3–4 agg.)	(Italy) Napoli	Salzburg, Austria
18:55 CET (UTC+01:00)	Dabour 25'; Onguéné (yellow card) 42'; Samassékou (yellow card) 56'; Gulbrandsen 65'; Leitgeb 90+2'	Report	Milik 14', (yellow card) 44'	Stadium: Red Bull Arena; Attendance: 29,520; Referee: Carlos del Cerro Grande (Spain)

===== Quarter-finals =====
11 April 2019 First leg	Arsenal (England)	2–0	(Italy) Napoli	London, England
21:00 CEST (UTC+02:00)	Ramsey 15'; Koulibaly 25' (o.g.)	Report	Hysaj (yellow card) 47'	Stadium: Emirates Stadium; Attendance: 59,738; Referee: Alberto Undiano Mallenco (Spain)

18 April 2019 Second leg	Napoli (Italy)	0–1 (0–3 agg.)	(England) Arsenal	Naples, Italy
21:00 CEST (UTC+02:00)	Insigne (yellow card) 43'; Callejón (yellow card) 90'	Report	Lacazette 36'; Čech (yellow card) 74'	Stadium: Stadio San Paolo; Attendance: 39,438; Referee: Ovidiu Hațegan (Romania)

== Statistics ==
=== Appearances and goals ===
No.	Pos	Nat	Player	Total		Serie A		Coppa Italia		Champions League		Europa League	
No.	Pos	Nat	Player	Apps	Goals	Apps	Goals	Apps	Goals	Apps	Goals	Apps	Goals
Goalkeepers
1	GK	(Italy) ITA	Alex Meret	21	0	13+1	0	1	0	0	0	6	0
25	GK	(Colombia) COL	David Ospina	24	0	16+1	0	1	0	6	0	0	0
27	GK	(Greece) GRE	Orestis Karnezis	9	0	9	0	0	0	0	0	0	0
Defenders
2	DF	(France) FRA	Kévin Malcuit	27	0	20+4	0	1	0	0	0	1+1	0
6	DF	(Portugal) POR	Mário Rui	28	1	17+3	1	1	0	6	0	0+1	0
13	DF	(Italy) ITA	Sebastiano Luperto	15	0	6+6	0	0	0	0	0	1+2	0
19	DF	(Serbia) SRB	Nikola Maksimović	27	0	15+2	0	1	0	5	0	4	0
21	DF	(Romania) ROU	Vlad Chiricheș	6	0	3	0	0	0	0	0	3	0
23	DF	(Albania) ALB	Elseid Hysaj	35	0	24+3	0	1	0	1+2	0	4	0
26	DF	(Senegal) SEN	Kalidou Koulibaly	48	2	35	2	2	0	6	0	5	0
31	DF	(Algeria) ALG	Faouzi Ghoulam	21	1	12+4	1	1	0	0+1	0	3	0
33	DF	(Spain) ESP	Raúl Albiol	26	1	19+1	1	0	0	6	0	0	0
Midfielders
5	MF	(Brazil) BRA	Allan	47	1	28+5	1	1+1	0	6	0	5+1	0
8	MF	(Spain) ESP	Fabián Ruiz	40	7	20+7	5	2	1	6	0	5	1
18	MF	(Italy) ITA	Gianluca Gaetano	3	0	0+2	0	0+1	0	0	0	0	0
20	MF	(Poland) POL	Piotr Zieliński	49	7	33+3	6	1	0	1+5	0	6	1
42	MF	(Guinea) GUI	Amadou Diawara	19	0	8+5	0	2	0	0	0	1+3	0
Forwards
7	FW	(Spain) ESP	José Callejón	47	4	29+5	3	1+1	0	6	0	5	1
9	FW	(Italy) ITA	Simone Verdi	24	4	9+13	3	0	0	0+1	0	1	1
11	FW	(Algeria) ALG	Adam Ounas	26	4	6+12	3	1+1	0	0+2	0	1+3	1
14	FW	(Belgium) BEL	Dries Mertens	47	19	23+12	16	0+1	0	4+2	3	4+1	0
24	FW	(Italy) ITA	Lorenzo Insigne	41	14	24+4	10	2	0	6	3	4+1	1
34	FW	(Germany) GER	Amin Younes	16	3	6+6	3	0+1	0	0	0	0+3	0
99	FW	(Poland) POL	Arkadiusz Milik	47	20	27+8	17	2	1	2+2	0	4+2	2
Players transferred out during the season
17	MF	(Slovakia) SVK	Marek Hamšík	19	1	12+1	0	0	0	5+1	1	0	0
30	MF	(Croatia) CRO	Marko Rog	11	1	4+5	1	0	0	0+2	0	0	0

Last updated: 25 May 2019
Source: Competitions

=== Goalscorers ===
Rank	No.	Pos	Nat	Name	Serie A	Coppa Italia	UEFA CL	UEFA EL	Total
1	99	FW	(Poland)	Arkadiusz Milik	17	1	0	2	20
2	14	FW	(Belgium)	Dries Mertens	16	0	3	0	19
3	24	FW	(Italy)	Lorenzo Insigne	10	0	3	1	14
4	8	MF	(Spain)	Fabián Ruiz	5	1	0	1	7
4	20	MF	(Poland)	Piotr Zieliński	6	0	0	1	7
6	7	FW	(Spain)	José Callejón	3	0	0	1	4
6	9	FW	(Italy)	Simone Verdi	3	0	0	1	4
6	11	FW	(Algeria)	Adam Ounas	3	0	0	1	4
9	34	FW	(Germany)	Amin Younes	3	0	0	0	3
10	26	DF	(Senegal)	Kalidou Koulibaly	2	0	0	0	2
11	5	MF	(Brazil)	Allan	1	0	0	0	1
11	6	DF	(Portugal)	Mário Rui	1	0	0	0	1
11	17	MF	(Slovakia)	Marek Hamšík	0	0	1	0	1
11	30	MF	(Croatia)	Marko Rog	1	0	0	0	1
11	31	DF	(Algeria)	Faouzi Ghoulam	1	0	0	0	1
11	33	DF	(Spain)	Raúl Albiol	1	0	0	0	1
Own goals					1	0	0	1	2
Totals					74	2	7	9	92

=== Clean sheets ===
Rank	No.	Pos	Nat	Name	Serie A	Coppa Italia	UEFA CL	UEFA EL	Total
1	1	GK	(Italy)	Alex Meret	6	0	0	2	8
2	25	GK	(Colombia)	David Ospina	3	1	2	0	6
3	27	GK	(Greece)	Orestis Karnezis	4	0	0	0	4
Totals					13	1	2	2	18

Last updated: 14 March 2019

=== Disciplinary record ===
No.	Pos	Nat	Name	Serie A			Coppa Italia			UEFA CL			UEFA EL			Total		
No.	Pos	Nat	Name	Booked	(yellow card) (yellow-red card)	Sent off (straight red)	Booked	(yellow card) (yellow-red card)	Sent off (straight red)	Booked	(yellow card) (yellow-red card)	Sent off (straight red)	Booked	(yellow card) (yellow-red card)	Sent off (straight red)	Booked	(yellow card) (yellow-red card)	Sent off (straight red)
1	GK	(Italy)	Alex Meret	0	0	1	0	0	0	0	0	0	0	0	0	0	0	1
25	GK	(Colombia)	David Ospina	0	0	0	0	0	0	1	0	0	0	0	0	1	0	0
2	DF	(France)	Kévin Malcuit	3	0	0	1	0	0	0	0	0	0	0	0	4	0	0
6	DF	(Portugal)	Mário Rui	3	1	0	1	0	0	2	0	0	0	0	0	6	1	0
19	DF	(Serbia)	Nikola Maksimović	3	0	0	1	0	0	1	0	0	2	0	0	7	0	0
21	DF	(Romania)	Vlad Chiricheș	0	0	0	0	0	0	0	0	0	1	0	0	1	0	0
23	DF	(Albania)	Elseid Hysaj	2	0	0	0	0	0	1	0	0	0	0	0	3	0	0
26	DF	(Senegal)	Kalidou Koulibaly	7	0	1	1	0	0	2	0	0	1	0	0	11	0	1
31	DF	(Algeria)	Faouzi Ghoulam	0	0	0	0	0	0	0	0	0	1	0	0	1	0	0
33	DF	(Spain)	Raúl Albiol	4	0	0	0	0	0	1	0	0	0	0	0	5	0	0
5	MF	(Brazil)	Allan	8	0	0	0	0	0	1	0	0	0	0	0	9	0	0
8	MF	(Spain)	Fabián Ruiz	0	1	0	0	0	0	1	0	0	0	0	0	1	1	0
17	MF	(Slovakia)	Marek Hamšík	1	0	0	0	0	0	0	0	0	0	0	0	1	0	0
20	MF	(Poland)	Piotr Zieliński	4	0	0	0	0	0	0	0	0	0	0	0	4	0	0
30	MF	(Croatia)	Marko Rog	3	0	0	0	0	0	0	0	0	0	0	0	3	0	0
42	MF	(Guinea)	Amadou Diawara	4	0	0	0	0	0	0	0	0	1	0	0	5	0	0
7	FW	(Spain)	José Callejón	1	0	0	0	0	0	1	0	0	0	0	0	2	0	0
9	FW	(Italy)	Simone Verdi	0	0	0	0	0	0	0	0	0	0	0	0	0	0	0
11	FW	(Algeria)	Adam Ounas	0	0	0	1	0	0	0	0	0	1	0	0	2	0	0
14	FW	(Belgium)	Dries Mertens	1	0	0	0	0	0	1	0	0	0	0	0	2	0	0
24	FW	(Italy)	Lorenzo Insigne	5	0	1	0	0	0	0	0	0	0	0	0	5	0	1
99	FW	(Poland)	Arkadiusz Milik	2	0	0	1	0	0	1	0	0	1	0	0	5	0	0
Totals				51	2	3	6	0	0	13	0	0	8	0	0	78	2	3

Last updated: 14 March 2019
