= 2016–17 SSC Napoli season =

Napoli
2016–17 season
- Napoli players lining up before a UEFA Champions League match against Dynamo Kyiv in September 2016
- President: Aurelio De Laurentiis
- Manager: Maurizio Sarri
- Stadium: Stadio San Paolo
- Serie A: 3rd
- Coppa Italia: Semi-finals
- UEFA Champions League: Round of 16
- Top goalscorer: League: Dries Mertens (28); All: Dries Mertens (34)
- Highest home attendance: 56,695 vs Real Madrid (7 March 2017, Champions League)
- Lowest home attendance: 15,912 vs Empoli (26 October 2016, Serie A)
- Average home league attendance: 36,601
Home colours	Away colours	Third colours

The 2016–17 season was Società Sportiva Calcio Napoli's 71st season in Serie A. The team competed in Serie A, the Coppa Italia, and the UEFA Champions League.

In the league, Napoli enjoyed an excellent campaign, finishing third but scoring a league-high 94 goals, led by Dries Mertens, converted from a winger into a centre-forward, who finished with 28 goals, only one behind capocannoniere Edin Džeko. The club was eliminated in the semi-finals of the Coppa Italia by eventual winners Juventus, and were knocked out of the Champions League in the round of 16 by eventual champions Real Madrid.

== Players ==
=== Squad information ===
As of 31 January 2017

Note: Flags indicate national team as defined under FIFA eligibility rules; some limited exceptions apply. Players may hold more than one non-FIFA nationality.

No.	Pos.	Nation	Player
1	GK	BRA	Rafael
2	DF	ALB	Elseid Hysaj
3	DF	CRO	Ivan Strinić
4	MF	ITA	Emanuele Giaccherini
5	MF	BRA	Allan
7	FW	ESP	José Callejón
8	MF	ITA	Jorginho
11	DF	ITA	Christian Maggio
14	FW	BEL	Dries Mertens
17	MF	SVK	Marek Hamšík (Captain)
18	FW	BRA	Leandrinho
19	DF	SRB	Nikola Maksimović
20	MF	POL	Piotr Zieliński

No.	Pos.	Nation	Player
21	DF	ROU	Vlad Chiricheș
22	GK	ITA	Luigi Sepe
23	FW	ITA	Alessio Zerbin
24	FW	ITA	Lorenzo Insigne
25	GK	ESP	Pepe Reina
26	DF	SEN	Kalidou Koulibaly
30	MF	CRO	Marko Rog
31	DF	ALG	Faouzi Ghoulam
32	FW	ITA	Leonardo Pavoletti
33	DF	ESP	Raúl Albiol
42	MF	GUI	Amadou Diawara
62	DF	ITA	Lorenzo Tonelli
99	FW	POL	Arkadiusz Milik

== Transfers ==
=== In ===
Date	Pos.	Player	Age	Moving from	Fee	Notes	Source
23 May 2016	DF	(Italy) Lorenzo Tonelli	26	(Italy) Empoli	€10M		
16 July 2016	MF	(Italy) Emanuele Giaccherini	31	(England) Sunderland	€1.5M + bonuses		
1 August 2016	FW	(Poland) Arkadiusz Milik	22	(Netherlands) Ajax	€35M		
4 August 2016	MF	(Poland) Piotr Zieliński	22	(Italy) Udinese	€16M		
28 August 2016	MF	(Guinea) Amadou Diawara	19	(Italy) Bologna	Undisclosed		
29 August 2016	MF	(Croatia) Marko Rog	21	(Croatia) Dinamo Zagreb	Undisclosed		
2 January 2017	FW	(Italy) Leonardo Pavoletti	28	(Italy) Genoa	€18M		

==== Loans in ====
Date	Pos.	Player	Age	Moving from	Fee	Notes	Source
31 August 2016	DF	(Serbia) Nikola Maksimović	24	(Italy) Torino	€5M + Mirko Valdifiori	Loan with an obligation to buy for €20M	

=== Out ===
Date	Pos.	Player	Age	Moving to	Fee	Notes	Source
25 July 2016	GK	(Argentina) Mariano Andújar	32	(Argentina) Estudiantes	Undisclosed		
26 July 2016	FW	(Argentina) Gonzalo Higuaín	28	(Italy) Juventus	€90M	Paid in two installments. Third highest football transfer of all-time and highest ever transfer for an Italian club.	
26 August 2016	MF	(Spain) David López	26	(Spain) Espanyol	Undisclosed		
31 August 2016	MF	(Italy) Mirko Valdifiori	30	(Italy) Torino	Undisclosed		
31 January 2017	MF	(Morocco) Omar El Kaddouri	26	(Italy) Empoli	Undisclosed		
31 January 2017	FW	(Italy) Manolo Gabbiadini	25	(England) Southampton	€17M + €3M in bonuses		

==== Loans out ====
Date	Pos.	Player	Age	Moving to	Fee	Notes	Source
26 August 2016	MF	(Netherlands) Jonathan de Guzmán	28	(Italy) Chievo	Loan	Loan with an option to buy	
30 August 2016	MF	(Italy) Alberto Grassi	21	(Italy) Atalanta	Loan		

== Pre-season and friendlies ==
28 July 2016 Friendly	Napoli (Italy)	5–0	(Italy) Virtus Entella	Trento, Italy
	Iacobucci 28' (o.g.); Mertens 48', 57'; Insigne 58'; López 75'	Report		Stadium: Stadio Briamasco; Referee: Claudio Gavillucci

1 August 2016 Friendly	Napoli (Italy)	3–0	(France) Nice	Naples
	Koulibaly 9', 28'; Mertens 24'	Report		Stadium: Stadio San Paolo; Referee: Carmine Russo

7 August 2016 Friendly	Napoli (Italy)	5–0	(France) Monaco	Naples
21:00	Gabbiadini 4', 17', 48' (pen.), 64'; Allan 65'	Report		Stadium: Stadio San Paolo

13 August 2016 Friendly	Hertha BSC (Germany)	1–4	(Italy) Napoli	Berlin, Germany
18:00	Ibišević 24'	Report	Hamšík 36'; Callejón 54'; Milik 71'; Mertens 83'	Stadium: Friedrich-Ludwig-Jahn-Sportpark

== Competitions ==
=== Overall ===
Competition	Started round	Final position	First match	Last match
Serie A	Matchday 1	3rd	21 August 2016	28 May 2017
Coppa Italia	Round of 16	Semi-finals	10 January 2017	5 April 2017
Champions League	Group stage	Round of 16	13 September 2016	7 March 2017

=== Serie A ===
==== League table ====
Pos	Team	Pld	W	D	L	GF	GA	GD	Pts	Qualification or relegation
1	Juventus (C)	38	29	4	5	77	27	+50	91	Qualification for the Champions League group stage
2	Roma	38	28	3	7	90	38	+52	87	Qualification for the Champions League group stage
3	Napoli	38	26	8	4	94	39	+55	86	Qualification for the Champions League play-off round
4	Atalanta	38	21	9	8	62	41	+21	72	Qualification for the Europa League group stage (Note: Since the winners of the 2016–17 Coppa Italia, Juventus, qualified for European competition based on league position, the spot awarded to the cup winners (Europa League group stage) was passed to the fifth-placed team and the spot awarded to the fifth-placed team (Europa League third qualifying round) was passed to the sixth-placed team.)
5	Lazio	38	21	7	10	74	51	+23	70	Qualification for the Europa League group stage

Source: Serie A, Soccerway
Rules for classification: 1) Points; 2) Head-to-head points; 3) Head-to-head goal difference; 4) Goal difference; 5) Goals scored; 6) Draw.
(C) Champions

==== Results summary ====
Overall								Home						Away					
Pld	W	D	L	GF	GA	GD	Pts	W	D	L	GF	GA	GD	W	D	L	GF	GA	GD
38	26	8	4	94	39	+55	86	13	4	2	44	19	+25	13	4	2	50	20	+30

Last updated: 28 May 2017.
Source: Competitive matches

==== Results by round ====
Round	1	2	3	4	5	6	7	8	9	10	11	12	13	14	15	16	17	18	19	20	21	22	23	24	25	26	27	28	29	30	31	32	33	34	35	36	37	38
Ground	A	H	A	H	A	H	A	H	A	H	A	H	A	H	H	A	H	A	H	H	A	H	A	H	A	H	A	H	A	H	A	H	A	A	H	A	H	A
Result	D	W	W	W	D	W	L	L	W	W	L	D	W	D	W	W	W	D	W	W	W	D	W	W	W	L	W	W	W	D	W	W	D	W	W	W	W	W
Position	10	6	2	1	2	2	2	5	4	3	5	6	6	7	4	4	3	3	3	3	3	3	3	3	3	3	3	3	3	3	3	3	3	3	3	3	3	3

Updated to match(es) played on 28 May 2017. Source: Competitive matches
A = Away; H = Home; W = Win; D = Draw; L = Loss

==== Matches ====
21 August 2016 1	Pescara	2–2	Napoli	Pescara
20:45 CEST (UTC+02:00)	Benali 8'; Caprari 35'; Brugman (yellow card) 47'; Bizzarri (yellow card) 52'; Gyömbér (yellow card) 74'	Report	Albiol (yellow card) 29'; Mertens 60', 63', (yellow card) 90+2'	Stadium: Stadio Adriatico – Giovanni Cornacchia; Attendance: 16,758; Referee: Piero Giacomelli

27 August 2016 2	Napoli	4–2	Milan	Naples
20:45 CEST (UTC+02:00)	Milik 18', 33'; Koulibaly (yellow card) 55'; Hysaj (yellow card) 70'; Callejón 74', 90+4'; Jorginho (yellow card) 85'; Albiol (yellow card) 86'; Zieliński (yellow card) 90'	Report	Niang 51', (yellow card) 53' (yellow-red card) 88'; Suso 55', (yellow card) 66'; Gómez (yellow card) 61'; Kucka (yellow card) 77' (red card) 77'; Romagnoli (yellow card) 90+4'	Stadium: Stadio San Paolo; Attendance: 27,231; Referee: Paolo Valeri

10 September 2016 3	Palermo	0–3	Napoli	Palermo
20:45 CEST (UTC+02:00)		Report	Hamšík 47'; Callejón 51', 65'	Stadium: Stadio Renzo Barbera; Attendance: 10,961; Referee: Davide Massa

17 September 2016 4	Napoli	3–1	Bologna	Naples
20:45 CEST (UTC+02:00)	Callejón 14'; Milik 67', 78'	Report	Taïder (yellow card) 9'; Verdi 56'; Krafth (red card) 80'	Stadium: Stadio San Paolo; Attendance: 21,083; Referee: Daniele Doveri

21 September 2016 5	Genoa	0–0	Napoli	Genoa
20:45 CEST (UTC+02:00)	Orbán (yellow card) 32'; Rincón (yellow card) 53'; Ntcham (yellow card) 75'; Simeone (yellow card) 77'	Report	Hysaj (yellow card) 52'; Jorginho (yellow card) 79'	Stadium: Stadio Luigi Ferraris; Attendance: 23,905; Referee: Antonio Damato

24 September 2016 6	Napoli	2–0	Chievo	Naples
20:45 CEST (UTC+02:00)	Koulibaly (yellow card) 14'; Gabbiadini 24'; Hamšík 39'; Albiol (yellow card) 43'	Report	Gobbi (yellow card) 11'; Cesar (yellow card) 44'; Dainelli (yellow card) 54'; Castro (yellow card) 76'	Stadium: Stadio San Paolo; Attendance: 19,942; Referee: Marco Di Bello

2 October 2016 7	Atalanta	1–0	Napoli	Bergamo
15:00 CEST (UTC+02:00)	Petagna 9'; Conti (yellow card) 19'; Gagliardini (yellow card) 28'; Toloi (yellow card) 58'	Report	Koulibaly (yellow card) 71'; Milik (yellow card) 77'; Mertens (yellow card) 87'	Stadium: Stadio Atleti Azzurri d'Italia; Attendance: 15,732; Referee: Nicola Rizzoli

15 October 2016 8	Napoli	1–3	Roma	Naples
15:00 CEST (UTC+02:00)	Mertens (yellow card) 53'; Koulibaly 58'; Allan (yellow card) 85'	Report	Džeko 43', 54', (yellow card) 83'; Paredes (yellow card) 45+1'; Juan Jesus (yellow card) 50'; Salah 85'	Stadium: Stadio San Paolo; Attendance: 46,078; Referee: Daniele Orsato

23 October 2016 9	Crotone	1–2	Napoli	Crotone
15:00 CEST (UTC+02:00)	Ferrari (yellow card) 32'; Crisetig (yellow card) 58'; Rosi 89'	Report	Callejón 17'; Gabbiadini (red card) 31'; Maksimović 33'	Stadium: Stadio Ezio Scida; Attendance: 8,329; Referee: Paolo Mazzoleni

26 October 2016 10	Napoli	2–0	Empoli	Naples
20:45 CEST (UTC+02:00)	Mertens 51', (yellow card) 52'; Chiricheș 81'	Report	Bellusci (yellow card) 38'; Tello (yellow card) 83'	Stadium: Stadio San Paolo; Attendance: 15,912; Referee: Maurizio Mariani

29 October 2016 11	Juventus	2–1	Napoli	Turin
20:45 CEST (UTC+02:00)	Chiellini (yellow card) 21'; Alex Sandro (yellow card) 22'; Bonucci 50'; Hernanes (yellow card) 61'; Higuaín 70'; Mandžukić (yellow card) 85'	Report	Insigne (yellow card) 30'; Callejón 54'	Stadium: Juventus Stadium; Attendance: 41,409; Referee: Gianluca Rocchi

5 November 2016 12	Napoli	1–1	Lazio	Naples
20:45 CET (UTC+01:00)	Hamšík 52'	Report	Parolo (yellow card) 28'; Radu (yellow card) 51'; Keita 54'	Stadium: Stadio San Paolo; Attendance: 29,994; Referee: Antonio Damato

19 November 2016 13	Udinese	1–2	Napoli	Udine
18:00 CET (UTC+01:00)	Perica 59'; Felipe (yellow card) 74'	Report	Insigne 47', 57'	Stadium: Stadio Friuli; Attendance: 18,501; Referee: Luca Banti

28 November 2016 14	Napoli	1–1	Sassuolo	Naples
19:00 CET (UTC+01:00)	Strinić (yellow card) 10'; Allan (yellow card) 13'; Insigne 42'; Mertens (yellow card) 66'	Report	Peluso (yellow card) 12'; Mazzitelli (yellow card) 37'; Ricci (yellow card) 47'; Ragusa (yellow card) 70'; Defrel 82'	Stadium: Stadio San Paolo; Attendance: 49,490; Referee: Paolo Valeri

2 December 2016 15	Napoli	3–0	Internazionale	Naples
20:45 CET (UTC+01:00)	Zieliński 2', (yellow card) 45+2'; Hamšík 5'; Insigne 51'; Albiol (yellow card) 67'	Report	Ranocchia (yellow card) 5'; Ansaldi (yellow card) 45'; Brozović (yellow card) 82'	Stadium: Stadio San Paolo; Attendance: 32,341; Referee: Nicola Rizzoli

11 December 2016 16	Cagliari	0–5	Napoli	Cagliari
12:30 CET (UTC+01:00)	Isla (yellow card) 20'; Barella (yellow card) 36'; Padoin (yellow card) 66'; Dessena (yellow card) 74'	Report	Mertens 34', 69', 72'; Koulibaly (yellow card) 39'; Hamšík 45', (yellow card) 74'; Zieliński 51'; Hysaj (yellow card) 62'	Stadium: Stadio Sant'Elia; Attendance: 13,989; Referee: Gianpaolo Calvarese

18 December 2016 17	Napoli	5–3	Torino	Naples
20:45 CET (UTC+01:00)	Mertens 13', 18' (pen.), 22', 80'; Chiricheș 70'	Report	Rossettini (yellow card) 34', (goal) 76'; Belotti 58'; Moretti (yellow card) 60'; Lukić (yellow card) 72'; Falque 84' (pen.)	Stadium: Stadio San Paolo; Attendance: 29,221; Referee: Daniele Doveri

22 December 2016 18	Fiorentina	3–3	Napoli	Florence
20:45 CET (UTC+01:00)	Kalinić (yellow card) 3'; Olivera (yellow card) 45+3'; Bernardeschi 51', 69', (yellow card) 70'; Tomović (yellow card) 53'; Zárate 82', (yellow card) 84'	Report	Albiol (yellow card) 1'; Insigne 25'; Reina (yellow card) 45+1'; Maksimović (yellow card) 50'; Mertens 68'; Gabbiadini 90+4' (pen.)	Stadium: Stadio Artemio Franchi; Attendance: 26,181; Referee: Paolo Tagliavento

7 January 2017 19	Napoli	2–1	Sampdoria	Naples
20:45 CET (UTC+01:00)	Hysaj (yellow card) 69'; Gabbiadini 77'; Tonelli 90+5'	Report	Hysaj 30' (o.g.); Silvestre (yellow card) 54' (yellow-red card) 61'	Stadium: Stadio San Paolo; Attendance: 29,870; Referee: Marco Di Bello

15 January 2017 20	Napoli	3–1	Pescara	Naples
15:00 CET (UTC+01:00)	Tonelli (yellow card) 43', (goal) 47'; Hamšík 49'; Mertens 85'	Report	Coda (yellow card) 40'; Benali (yellow card) 44'; Bizzarri (yellow card) 54'; Caprari 90+4' (pen.)	Stadium: Stadio San Paolo; Attendance: 31,117; Referee: Claudio Gavillucci

21 January 2017 21	Milan	1–2	Napoli	Milan
20:45 CET (UTC+01:00)	Calabria (yellow card) 22'; Sosa (yellow card) 26'; Kucka 37'; Gómez (yellow card) 51'; Bacca (yellow card) 56'	Report	Insigne 6'; Callejón 9', (yellow card) 82'; Mertens (yellow card) 12'; Strinić (yellow card) 38'; Tonelli (yellow card) 45+1'	Stadium: San Siro; Attendance: 54,257; Referee: Gianluca Rocchi

29 January 2017 22	Napoli	1–1	Palermo	Naples
20:45 CET (UTC+01:00)	Mertens 66'	Report	Nestorovski 6'; Quaison (yellow card) 23'; Bruno Henrique (yellow card) 32'; Jajalo (yellow card) 65'; Goldaniga (red card) 90'; González (yellow card) 90+2'	Stadium: Stadio San Paolo; Attendance: 41,166; Referee: Domenico Celi

4 February 2017 23	Bologna	1–7	Napoli	Bologna
20:45 CET (UTC+01:00)	Pulgar (yellow card) 11'; Masina (red card) 32'; Torosidis 36'; Maietta (yellow card) 61'	Report	Hamšík 4', 70', 74'; Insigne 6'; Diawara (yellow card) 20'; Callejón (yellow card) 25' (red card) 26'; Mertens 33', 43', 90'; Hysaj (yellow card) 75'	Stadium: Stadio Renato Dall'Ara; Attendance: 23,297; Referee: Davide Massa

10 February 2017 24	Napoli	2–0	Genoa	Naples
20:45 CET (UTC+01:00)	Zieliński 50'; Giaccherini 68'; Rog (yellow card) 90+2'	Report	Orbán (yellow card) 67'; Burdisso (yellow card) 80'	Stadium: Stadio San Paolo; Attendance: 42,347; Referee: Piero Giacomelli

19 February 2017 25	Chievo	1–3	Napoli	Verona
15:00 CET (UTC+01:00)	Cacciatore (yellow card) 54'; Meggiorini 72'	Report	Insigne 31'; Hamšík 38'; Zieliński 58'	Stadium: Stadio Marc'Antonio Bentegodi; Attendance: 10,000; Referee: Massimiliano Irrati

25 February 2017 26	Napoli	0–2	Atalanta	Naples
18:00 CET (UTC+01:00)	Hysaj (yellow card) 41'	Report	Caldara 28', 70'; Kessié (yellow card) 64' (yellow-red card) 67'; Berisha (yellow card) 77'	Stadium: Stadio San Paolo; Attendance: 45,800; Referee: Domenico Celi

4 March 2017 27	Roma	1–2	Napoli	Rome
15:00 CET (UTC+01:00)	Manolas (yellow card) 45'; De Rossi (yellow card) 65'; Strootman 89'; Perotti (yellow card) 90+4'	Report	Rog (yellow card) 17'; Mertens 26', 50'; Ghoulam (yellow card) 83'	Stadium: Stadio Olimpico; Attendance: 30,909; Referee: Luca Banti

12 March 2017 28	Napoli	3–0	Crotone	Naples
15:00 CET (UTC+01:00)	Rog (yellow card) 27'; Insigne 32' (pen.), 70'; Mertens 66' (pen.)	Report	Martella (yellow card) 42'; Crisetig (yellow card) 54'; Ferrari (yellow card) 87'	Stadium: Stadio San Paolo; Attendance: 45,169; Referee: Maurizio Mariani

19 March 2017 29	Empoli	2–3	Napoli	Empoli
12:30 CET (UTC+01:00)	Costa (yellow card) 6'; Dioussé (yellow card) 64'; El Kaddouri 70'; Mauri (yellow card) 75'; Maccarone 82' (pen.)	Report	Insigne 19', 38' (pen.); Mertens 24'; Jorginho (yellow card) 32'; Callejón (yellow card) 69'; Hysaj (yellow card) 79'; Albiol (yellow card) 84'	Stadium: Stadio Carlo Castellani; Attendance: 13,732; Referee: Antonio Damato

2 April 2017 30	Napoli	1–1	Juventus	Naples
20:45 CEST (UTC+02:00)	Insigne (yellow card) 37'; Hamšík 60'	Report	Khedira 7'	Stadium: Stadio San Paolo; Attendance: 53,085; Referee: Daniele Orsato

9 April 2017 31	Lazio	0–3	Napoli	Rome
20:45 CEST (UTC+02:00)	Bastos (yellow card) 20'; Milinković-Savić (yellow card) 54'; Patric (yellow card) 89'	Report	Callejón 25'; Insigne 51', 90+2'; Allan (yellow card) 74'; Zieliński (yellow card) 85'; Hysaj (yellow card) 86'	Stadium: Stadio Olimpico; Attendance: 25,000; Referee: Massimiliano Irrati

15 April 2017 32	Napoli	3–0	Udinese	Naples
20:45 CEST (UTC+02:00)	Mertens 48'; Allan 63'; Callejón 72'	Report	Badu (yellow card) 1'	Stadium: Stadio San Paolo; Attendance: 38,764; Referee: Davide Massa

23 April 2017 33	Sassuolo	2–2	Napoli	Reggio Emilia
12:30 CEST (UTC+02:00)	Berardi 59'; Mazzitelli (yellow card) 64', (goal) 80'; Sensi (yellow card) 77'; Duncan (yellow card) 88'	Report	Mertens 52'; Strinić (yellow card) 80'; Milik 84'	Stadium: Mapei Stadium – Città del Tricolore; Attendance: 18,870; Referee: Antonio Damato

30 April 2017 34	Internazionale	0–1	Napoli	Milan
20:45 CEST (UTC+02:00)	Murillo (yellow card) 52'; Brozović (yellow card) 56'	Report	Callejón 43'; Koulibaly (yellow card) 65'; Rog (yellow card) 73'	Stadium: San Siro; Attendance: 57,076; Referee: Gianluca Rocchi

6 May 2017 35	Napoli	3–1	Cagliari	Naples
18:00 CEST (UTC+02:00)	Mertens 2', 49'; Zieliński (yellow card) 55'; Insigne 67'	Report	Farias 90+2'	Stadium: Stadio San Paolo; Attendance: 47,281; Referee: Piero Giacomelli

14 May 2017 36	Torino	0–5	Napoli	Turin
15:00 CEST (UTC+02:00)	Baselli (yellow card) 8'; Gustafson (yellow card) 53'	Report	Callejón 7', 76'; Albiol (yellow card) 57'; Insigne 60'; Mertens 72'; Zieliński 78'	Stadium: Stadio Olimpico Grande Torino; Attendance: 24,267; Referee: Massimiliano Irrati

20 May 2017 37	Napoli	4–1	Fiorentina	Naples
20:45 CEST (UTC+02:00)	Koulibaly 8', (yellow card) 49'; Insigne 36'; Albiol (yellow card) 43'; Mertens 57', 64'	Report	Vecino (yellow card) 58'; Iličić 60'	Stadium: Stadio San Paolo; Attendance: 49,519; Referee: Nicola Rizzoli

28 May 2017 38	Sampdoria	2–4	Napoli	Genoa
18:00 CEST (UTC+02:00)	Quagliarella 50'; Škriniar (yellow card) 53'; Álvarez 90'	Report	Mertens 36'; Insigne 42'; Hamšík 49'; Callejón 65'	Stadium: Stadio Luigi Ferraris; Attendance: 19,147; Referee: Luca Banti

=== Coppa Italia ===
10 January 2017 Round of 16	Napoli	3–1	Spezia	Naples
21:00 CET (UTC+01:00)	Zieliński 3'; Giaccherini 55'; Gabbiadini 57'	Report	Piccolo 35'	Stadium: Stadio San Paolo; Attendance: 22,329; Referee: Luca Pairetto

24 January 2017 Quarter-finals	Napoli	1–0	Fiorentina	Naples
20:45 CET (UTC+01:00)	Hysaj (yellow card) 67' (yellow-red card) 90'; Callejón 71'; Insigne (yellow card) 90+3'	Report	Sánchez (yellow card) 28'; Olivera (yellow card) 37' (red card) 90+4'; Astori (yellow card) 45+1'; Tomović (yellow card) 62'; Chiesa (yellow card) 90+4'	Stadium: Stadio San Paolo; Attendance: 31,850; Referee: Daniele Doveri

28 February 2017 Semi-finals; First leg	Juventus	3–1	Napoli	Turin
20:45 CET (UTC+01:00)	Asamoah (yellow card) 26'; Lichtsteiner (yellow card) 40'; Dybala 47' (pen.), 69' (pen.); Higuaín 64'	Report	Diawara (yellow card) 21'; Callejón 36'; Milik (yellow card) 38'; Rog (yellow card) 58'; Maggio (yellow card) 68'; Reina (yellow card) 68'	Stadium: Juventus Stadium; Attendance: 38,398; Referee: Paolo Valeri

5 April 2017 Semi-finals; Second leg	Napoli	3–2 (4–5 agg.)	Juventus	Naples
20:45 CEST (UTC+02:00)	Koulibaly (yellow card) 28'; Callejón (yellow card) 30'; Hamšík 53'; Mertens 61'; Diawara (yellow card) 65'; Insigne 67'; Maksimović (yellow card) 76'; Ghoulam (yellow card) 80'	Report	Rincón (yellow card) 25'; Cuadrado (yellow card) 30'; Higuaín 32', 59'; Pjanić (yellow card) 86'; Dani Alves (yellow card) 88'	Stadium: Stadio San Paolo; Attendance: 48,421; Referee: Luca Banti
Note: Nikola Maksimović was booked for dissent while a substitute.

=== UEFA Champions League ===
==== Group stage ====
Pos	Team	Pld	W	D	L	GF	GA	GD	Pts	Qualification	NAP	BEN	BES	DKV
1	(Italy) Napoli	6	3	2	1	11	8	+3	11	Advance to knockout phase	—	4–2	2–3	0–0
2	(Portugal) Benfica	6	2	2	2	10	10	0	8	Advance to knockout phase	1–2	—	1–1	1–0
3	(Turkey) Beşiktaş	6	1	4	1	9	14	−5	7	Transfer to Europa League	1–1	3–3	—	1–1
4	(Ukraine) Dynamo Kyiv	6	1	2	3	8	6	+2	5		1–2	0–2	6–0	—

Source: UEFA
Rules for classification: Group stage tiebreakers

13 September 2016 1	Dynamo Kyiv (Ukraine)	1–2	(Italy) Napoli	Kyiv, Ukraine
20:45 CEST (UTC+02:00)	Sydorchuk (yellow card) 9' (yellow-red card) 68'; Harmash 26', (yellow card) 56'	Report	Milik 36', 45+2', (yellow card) 65'	Stadium: Olimpiyskiy NSC; Attendance: 35,137; Referee: Willie Collum (Scotland)

28 September 2016 2	Napoli (Italy)	4–2	(Portugal) Benfica	Naples, Italy
20:45 CEST (UTC+02:00)	Hamšík 20'; Mertens 51', 58'; Milik 54' (pen.); Reina (yellow card) 86'	Report	López (yellow card) 50'; Júlio César (yellow card) 53'; Carrillo (yellow card) 65'; Guedes 70'; Fejsa (yellow card) 76'; Salvio 86'	Stadium: Stadio San Paolo; Attendance: 41,281; Referee: Felix Brych (Germany)

19 October 2016 3	Napoli (Italy)	2–3	(Turkey) Beşiktaş	Naples, Italy
20:45 CEST (UTC+02:00)	Mertens 30'; Maggio (yellow card) 53'; Gabbiadini 69' (pen.)	Report	Adriano 12', (yellow card) 53'; Aboubakar 38', 86', (yellow card) 88'; Erkin (yellow card) 68'	Stadium: Stadio San Paolo; Attendance: 28,502; Referee: Sergei Karasev (Russia)

1 November 2016 4	Beşiktaş (Turkey)	1–1	(Italy) Napoli	Istanbul, Turkey
18:45 CET (UTC+01:00)	Inler (yellow card) 47'; Quaresma 79' (pen.); Tosun (yellow card) 83'	Report	Jorginho (yellow card) 57'; Hamšík 82'	Stadium: Vodafone Park; Attendance: 35,552; Referee: Mark Clattenburg (England)

23 November 2016 5	Napoli (Italy)	0–0	(Ukraine) Dynamo Kyiv	Naples, Italy
20:45 CET (UTC+01:00)	Koulibaly (yellow card) 75'	Report	Sydorchuk (yellow card) 19'	Stadium: Stadio San Paolo; Attendance: 33,736; Referee: Ovidiu Hațegan (Romania)

6 December 2016 6	Benfica (Portugal)	1–2	(Italy) Napoli	Lisbon, Portugal
20:45 CET (UTC+01:00)	Jiménez 87'; Pizzi (yellow card) 89'	Report	Koulibaly (yellow card) 15'; Callejón 60'; Mertens 79'	Stadium: Estádio da Luz; Attendance: 55,634; Referee: Antonio Mateu Lahoz (Spain)

==== Knockout phase ====
===== Round of 16 =====
15 February 2017 First leg	Real Madrid (Spain)	3–1	(Italy) Napoli	Madrid, Spain
20:45 CET (UTC+01:00)	Ramos (yellow card) 17'; Benzema 18'; Kroos 49'; Modrić (yellow card) 52'; Casemiro 54'	Report	Insigne 8'; Zieliński (yellow card) 38'; Mertens (yellow card) 76'	Stadium: Santiago Bernabéu; Attendance: 78,000; Referee: Damir Skomina (Slovenia)

7 March 2017 Second leg	Napoli (Italy)	1–3 (2–6 agg.)	(Spain) Real Madrid	Naples, Italy
20:45 CET (UTC+01:00)	Mertens 24'; Allan (yellow card) 55'; Diawara (yellow card) 89'	Report	Ramos 52'; Mertens 57' (o.g.); Morata 90+1'	Stadium: Stadio San Paolo; Attendance: 56,695; Referee: Cüneyt Çakır (Turkey)

== Statistics ==
=== Appearances and goals ===
No.	Pos	Nat	Player	Total		Serie A		Coppa Italia		Champions League	
No.	Pos	Nat	Player	Apps	Goals	Apps	Goals	Apps	Goals	Apps	Goals
Goalkeepers
1	GK	(Brazil) BRA	Rafael	2	0	1	0	1	0	0	0
22	GK	(Italy) ITA	Luigi Sepe	0	0	0	0	0	0	0	0
25	GK	(Spain) ESP	Pepe Reina	48	0	37	0	3	0	8	0
Defenders
2	DF	(Albania) ALB	Elseid Hysaj	45	0	34+1	0	2+1	0	7	0
3	DF	(Croatia) CRO	Ivan Strinić	15	0	12	0	3	0	0	0
11	DF	(Italy) ITA	Christian Maggio	11	0	4+3	0	2+1	0	1	0
19	DF	(Serbia) SRB	Nikola Maksimović	12	1	7+1	1	2	0	1+1	0
21	DF	(Romania) ROU	Vlad Chiricheș	16	2	13+1	2	1	0	1	0
26	DF	(Senegal) SEN	Kalidou Koulibaly	38	2	28	2	2	0	8	0
31	DF	(Algeria) ALG	Faouzi Ghoulam	38	0	26+3	0	1	0	8	0
33	DF	(Spain) ESP	Raúl Albiol	35	0	25+1	0	3	0	6	0
62	DF	(Italy) ITA	Lorenzo Tonelli	3	2	3	2	0	0	0	0
Midfielders
4	MF	(Italy) ITA	Emanuele Giaccherini	19	2	1+15	1	1	1	0+2	0
5	MF	(Brazil) BRA	Allan	38	1	19+9	1	0+2	0	5+3	0
8	MF	(Italy) ITA	Jorginho	31	0	27	0	0	0	4	0
17	MF	(Slovakia) SVK	Marek Hamšík	49	15	37+1	12	3	1	8	2
20	MF	(Poland) POL	Piotr Zieliński	47	6	18+18	5	3+1	1	3+4	0
30	MF	(Croatia) CRO	Marko Rog	18	0	2+12	0	2	0	0+2	0
42	MF	(Guinea) GUI	Amadou Diawara	28	0	10+8	0	4	0	4+2	0
Forwards
7	FW	(Spain) ESP	José Callejón	49	17	37	14	3+1	2	8	1
14	FW	(Belgium) BEL	Dries Mertens	46	34	28+7	28	0+3	1	6+2	5
24	FW	(Italy) ITA	Lorenzo Insigne	49	20	35+2	18	4	1	6+2	1
32	FW	(Italy) ITA	Leonardo Pavoletti	9	0	2+3	0	1+3	0	0	0
99	FW	(Poland) POL	Arkadiusz Milik	23	8	4+13	5	2	0	2+2	3
Players transferred out during the season
6	MF	(Italy) ITA	Mirko Valdifiori	1	0	1	0	0	0	0	0
23	FW	(Italy) ITA	Manolo Gabbiadini	19	5	7+6	3	1	1	2+3	1
77	MF	(Morocco) MAR	Omar El Kaddouri	5	0	0+5	0	0	0	0	0

Last updated: 28 May 2017
Source: Competitions

=== Goalscorers ===
Rank	No.	Pos	Nat	Name	Serie A	Coppa Italia	UEFA CL	Total
1	14	FW	(Belgium)	Dries Mertens	28	1	5	34
2	24	FW	(Italy)	Lorenzo Insigne	18	1	1	20
3	7	FW	(Spain)	José Callejón	14	2	1	17
4	17	MF	(Slovakia)	Marek Hamšík	12	1	2	15
5	99	FW	(Poland)	Arkadiusz Milik	5	0	3	8
6	20	MF	(Poland)	Piotr Zieliński	5	1	0	6
7	23	FW	(Italy)	Manolo Gabbiadini	3	1	1	5
8	4	MF	(Italy)	Emanuele Giaccherini	1	1	0	2
8	21	DF	(Romania)	Vlad Chiricheș	2	0	0	2
8	26	DF	(Senegal)	Kalidou Koulibaly	2	0	0	2
8	62	DF	(Italy)	Lorenzo Tonelli	2	0	0	2
12	5	MF	(Brazil)	Allan	1	0	0	1
12	19	DF	(Serbia)	Nikola Maksimović	1	0	0	1
Own goal					0	0	0	0
Totals					94	8	13	115

Last updated: 28 May 2017

=== Clean sheets ===
Rank	No.	Pos	Nat	Name	Serie A	Coppa Italia	UEFA CL	Total
1	25	GK	(Spain)	Pepe Reina	12	1	1	14
Totals					12	1	1	14

Last updated: 28 May 2017

=== Disciplinary record ===
No.	Pos	Nat	Player	Serie A			Coppa Italia			UEFA CL			Total		
No.	Pos	Nat	Player	Yellow card	(yellow card) (yellow-red card)	Red card	Yellow card	(yellow card) (yellow-red card)	Red card	Yellow card	(yellow card) (yellow-red card)	Red card	Yellow card	(yellow card) (yellow-red card)	Red card
1	GK	(Brazil)	Rafael	0	0	0	0	0	0	0	0	0	0	0	0
22	GK	(Italy)	Luigi Sepe	0	0	0	0	0	0	0	0	0	0	0	0
25	GK	(Spain)	Pepe Reina	1	0	0	1	0	0	1	0	0	3	0	0
2	DF	(Albania)	Elseid Hysaj	8	0	0	0	1	0	0	0	0	8	1	0
3	DF	(Croatia)	Ivan Strinić	3	0	0	0	0	0	0	0	0	3	0	0
11	DF	(Italy)	Christian Maggio	0	0	0	1	0	0	1	0	0	2	0	0
19	DF	(Serbia)	Nikola Maksimović	1	0	0	1	0	0	0	0	0	2	0	0
21	DF	(Romania)	Vlad Chiricheș	0	0	0	0	0	0	0	0	0	0	0	0
26	DF	(Senegal)	Kalidou Koulibaly	6	0	0	1	0	0	2	0	0	9	0	0
31	DF	(Algeria)	Faouzi Ghoulam	1	0	0	1	0	0	0	0	0	2	0	0
33	DF	(Spain)	Raúl Albiol	8	0	0	0	0	0	0	0	0	8	0	0
62	DF	(Italy)	Lorenzo Tonelli	2	0	0	0	0	0	0	0	0	2	0	0
4	MF	(Italy)	Emanuele Giaccherini	0	0	0	0	0	0	0	0	0	0	0	0
5	MF	(Brazil)	Allan	3	0	0	0	0	0	1	0	0	4	0	0
8	MF	(Italy)	Jorginho	3	0	0	0	0	0	1	0	0	4	0	0
17	MF	(Slovakia)	Marek Hamšík	1	0	0	0	0	0	0	0	0	1	0	0
20	MF	(Poland)	Piotr Zieliński	4	0	0	0	0	0	1	0	0	5	0	0
30	MF	(Croatia)	Marko Rog	4	0	0	1	0	0	0	0	0	5	0	0
42	MF	(Guinea)	Amadou Diawara	1	0	0	2	0	0	1	0	0	4	0	0
77	MF	(Morocco)	Omar El Kaddouri	0	0	0	0	0	0	0	0	0	0	0	0
7	FW	(Spain)	José Callejón	3	0	1	1	0	0	0	0	0	4	0	1
14	FW	(Belgium)	Dries Mertens	6	0	0	0	0	0	1	0	0	7	0	0
23	FW	(Italy)	Manolo Gabbiadini	0	0	1	0	0	0	0	0	0	0	0	1
24	FW	(Italy)	Lorenzo Insigne	2	0	0	1	0	0	0	0	0	3	0	0
32	FW	(Italy)	Leonardo Pavoletti	0	0	0	0	0	0	0	0	0	0	0	0
99	FW	(Poland)	Arkadiusz Milik	1	0	0	1	0	0	1	0	0	3	0	0
Totals				58	0	2	11	1	0	10	0	0	79	1	2

Last updated: 28 May 2017
