= Amadou Diawara =

Guinean footballer (born 1997)

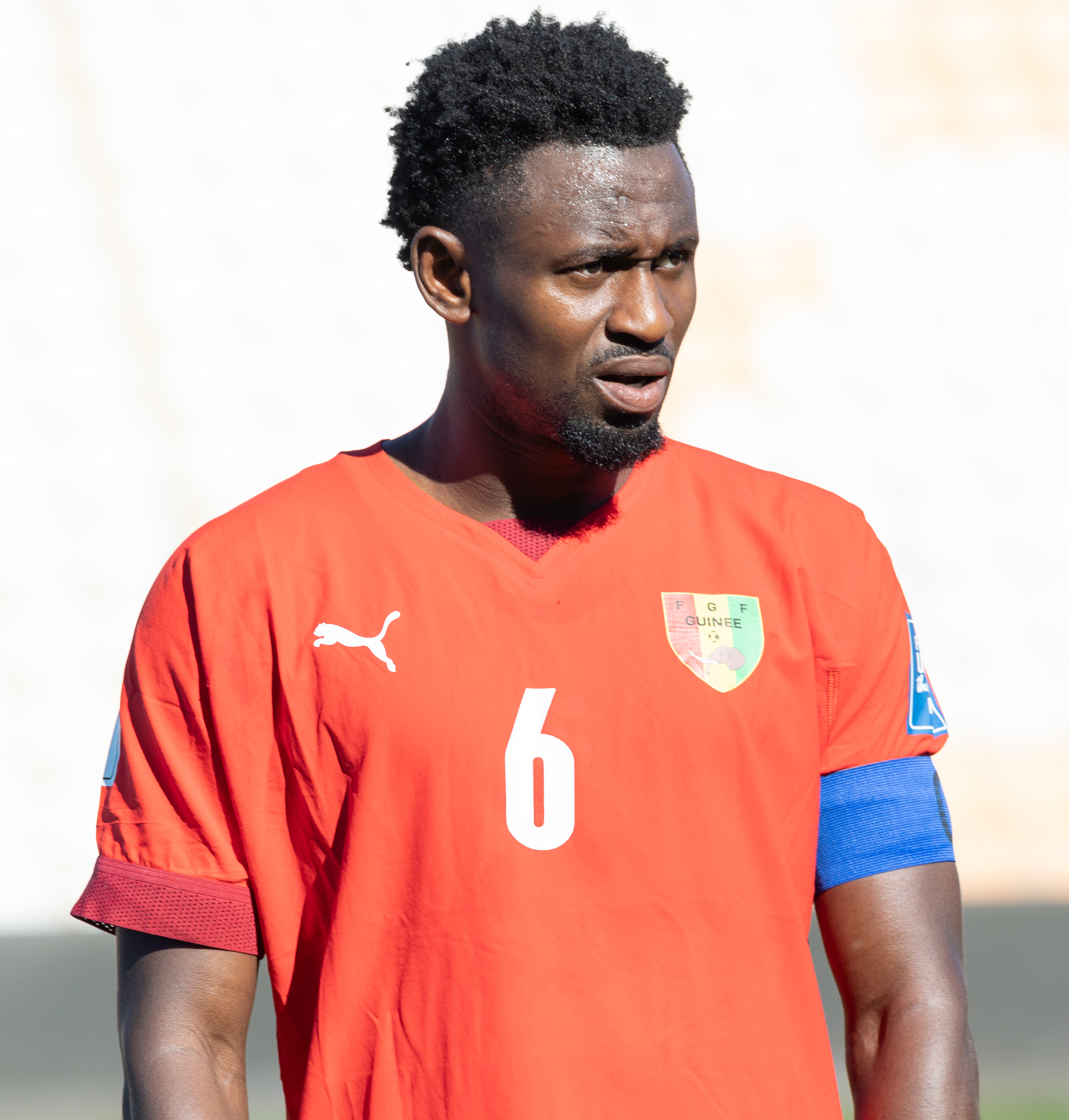
- Diawara playing for Guinea in 2023

Personal information
- Full name: Amadou Diawara
- Date of birth: 17 July 1997 (age 29)
- Place of birth: Conakry, Guinea
- Height: 1.83 m (6 ft 0 in)
- Position: Defensive midfielder

Team information
- Current team: Leganés
- Number: 24

Youth career
- 2010–2012: Syli Authentic
- 2012–2014: FC Séquence

Senior career*
Years	Team	Apps	(Gls)
2014–2015	San Marino	15	(0)
2015–2016	Bologna	34	(0)
2016–2019	Napoli	49	(1)
2019–2022	Roma	44	(2)
2022–2025	Anderlecht	33	(1)
2025	RSCA Futures	4	(0)
2025	Eldense	12	(2)
2025–	Leganés	40	(3)

International career^{‡}
2024	Guinea Olympic (O.P.)	3	(1)
2018–	Guinea	43	(0)
- * Club domestic league appearances and goals as of 9 June 2026 ‡ National team caps and goals as of 30 July 2024

Amadou Diawara (born 17 July 1997) is a Guinean professional footballer who plays as a midfielder for Spanish club Leganés and the Guinea national team. He competed for Guinea at the 2024 Summer Olympics.

== Club career ==
=== Early career ===
Amadou Diawara was born in Conakry, Guinea. Diawara joined Lega Pro side San Marino in 2014.

=== Bologna ===
While playing for San Marino, Bologna Director of football Pantaleo Corvino spotted his talents and brought him to Bologna in a deal costing the side £420,000 in July 2015. On 22 August 2015, Diawara made his Serie A debut for Bologna, in an away match against Lazio, coming on as an 84th-minute substitute for Lorenzo Crisetig.

=== Napoli ===
On 26 August 2016, Diawara signed for fellow Serie A club Napoli . On 17 October 2017, Diawara scored his first senior goal for Napoli from the penalty spot against Manchester City in the Champions League. On 8 April 2018, he scored his first Serie A goal and second senior goal for Napoli against Chievo Verona.

=== Roma ===
On 1 July 2019, Diawara signed a deal with Roma until 2024.

=== Anderlecht ===
On 31 August 2022, Diawara moved to Anderlecht on a three-year contract. On 4 February 2025, the contract was terminated by mutual consent.

=== Eldense ===
On 11 March 2025, Diawara signed for Spanish Segunda División club CD Eldense on a contract until 30 June 2025. He immediately became a starter, but was unable to avoid relegation.

=== Leganés ===
On 31 July 2025, Diawara agreed to a two-year deal with CD Leganés also in the Spanish second division.

== International career ==
Diawara was born in Guinea, but played football in Italy since 2014, and received Italian citizenship. The Azzurri trainer Giampiero Ventura was trying to recruit him in 2018. However, he pledged his international allegiance to the Guinea national team in March 2018, and he received a call-up to the national team in October 2018. Diawara debuted for Guinea in a 2–0 2019 Africa Cup of Nations qualification win over Rwanda on 12 October 2018.

== Career statistics ==
=== Club ===
As of match played 17 December 2023

Appearances and goals by club, season and competition
Club	Season	League			Cup		Europe		Other		Total	
Club	Season	Division	Apps	Goals	Apps	Goals	Apps	Goals	Apps	Goals	Apps	Goals
San Marino	2014–15	Lega Pro	15	0	0	0	—		—		15	0
Bologna	2015–16	Serie A	34	0	1	0	—		—		35	0
Napoli	2016–17	Serie A	18	0	4	0	6 (Note: Appearances in UEFA Champions League)	0	—		28	0
Napoli	2017–18	Serie A	18	1	1	0	8	1	—		27	2
Napoli	2018–19	Serie A	13	0	2	0	4 (Note: Appearances in UEFA Europa League)	0	—		19	0
Napoli	Total		49	1	7	0	18	1	—		74	2
Roma	2019–20	Serie A	22	1	2	0	6	0	—		30	1
Roma	2020–21	Serie A	18	1	0	0	10	0	—		28	1
Roma	2021–22	Serie A	4	0	0	0	4 (Note: Appearances in UEFA Europa Conference League)	0	—		8	0
Roma	Total		44	2	2	0	20	0	—		66	2
Anderlecht	2022–23	Belgian Pro League	22	1	2	0	11	0	—		35	1
Anderlecht	2023–24	Belgian Pro League	11	0	1	0	—		—		12	0
Anderlecht	Total		33	1	3	0	11	0	—		47	1
Career total			175	4	13	0	49	1	0	0	237	5

=== International ===
As of match played 10 June 2024

Appearances and goals by national team and year
National team	Year	Apps	Goals
Guinea	2018	3	0
Guinea	2019	7	0
Guinea	2020	1	0
Guinea	2021	7	0
Guinea	2022	10	0
Guinea	2023	9	0
Guinea	2024	6	0
Total		43	0

== Honours ==
Roma

- UEFA Europa Conference League: 2021–22
