= José Callejón =

Spanish footballer (born 1987)

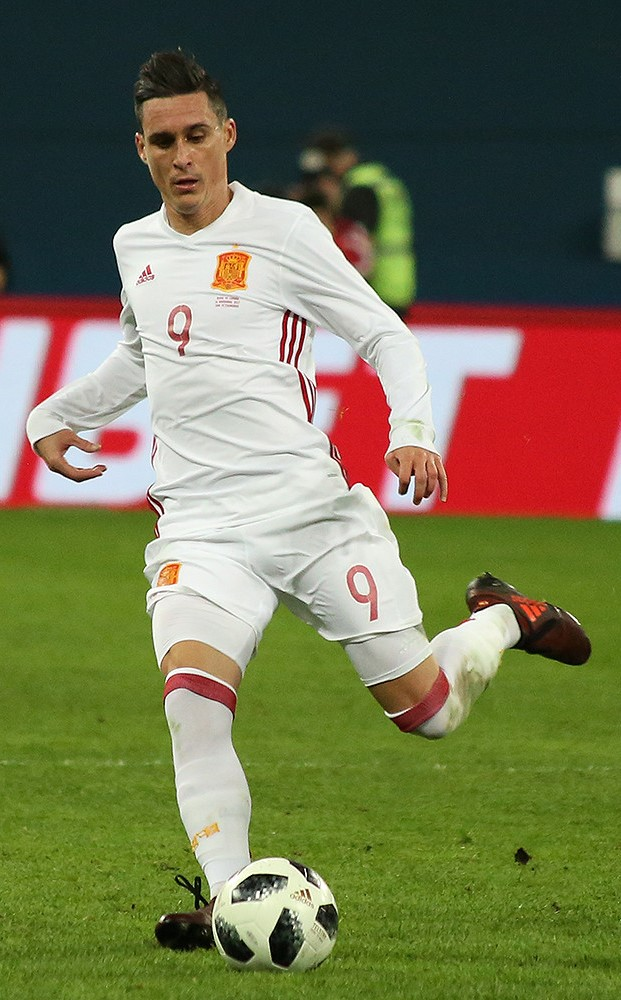
- Callejón with Spain in 2017

Personal information
- Full name: José María Callejón Bueno
- Date of birth: 11 February 1987 (age 39)
- Place of birth: Motril, Spain
- Height: 1.78 m (5 ft 10 in)
- Positions: Forward; winger

Youth career
- Costa Tropical
- 2002–2006: Real Madrid

Senior career*
Years	Team	Apps	(Gls)
2006–2007	Real Madrid C	4	(0)
2007–2008	Real Madrid B	41	(21)
2008–2011	Espanyol	97	(10)
2011–2013	Real Madrid	55	(8)
2013–2020	Napoli	255	(64)
2020–2022	Fiorentina	50	(1)
2022–2024	Granada	67	(4)
2024–2025	Marbella	38	(11)
Total		607	(119)

International career
2008–2009	Spain U21	4	(1)
2014–2017	Spain	5	(0)
- * Club domestic league appearances and goals

José María Callejón Bueno (Spanish pronunciation: [xoˈse kaʎeˈxon]; born 11 February 1987) is a Spanish former professional footballer who played as a forward or winger.

He began his career with the reserve teams of Real Madrid, but made a name for himself at Espanyol. In 2011 he returned to his previous club and, two years later, left for Napoli, where he won two Coppa Italia tournaments and the 2014 Supercoppa Italiana while appearing in 349 competitive matches (82 goals scored).

An under-21 international, Callejón made his senior debut for Spain in 2014.

== Club career ==
=== Real Madrid ===
A product of Real Madrid youth ranks, Callejón was born in Motril, Granada, Andalusia. He made his professional debut for the reserves in May 2007, and played five games in that season's Segunda División without scoring a goal.

In the 2007–08 campaign, Callejón appeared in 37 matches and netted 21 times, finishing as team top scorer but in the Segunda División B.

=== Espanyol ===
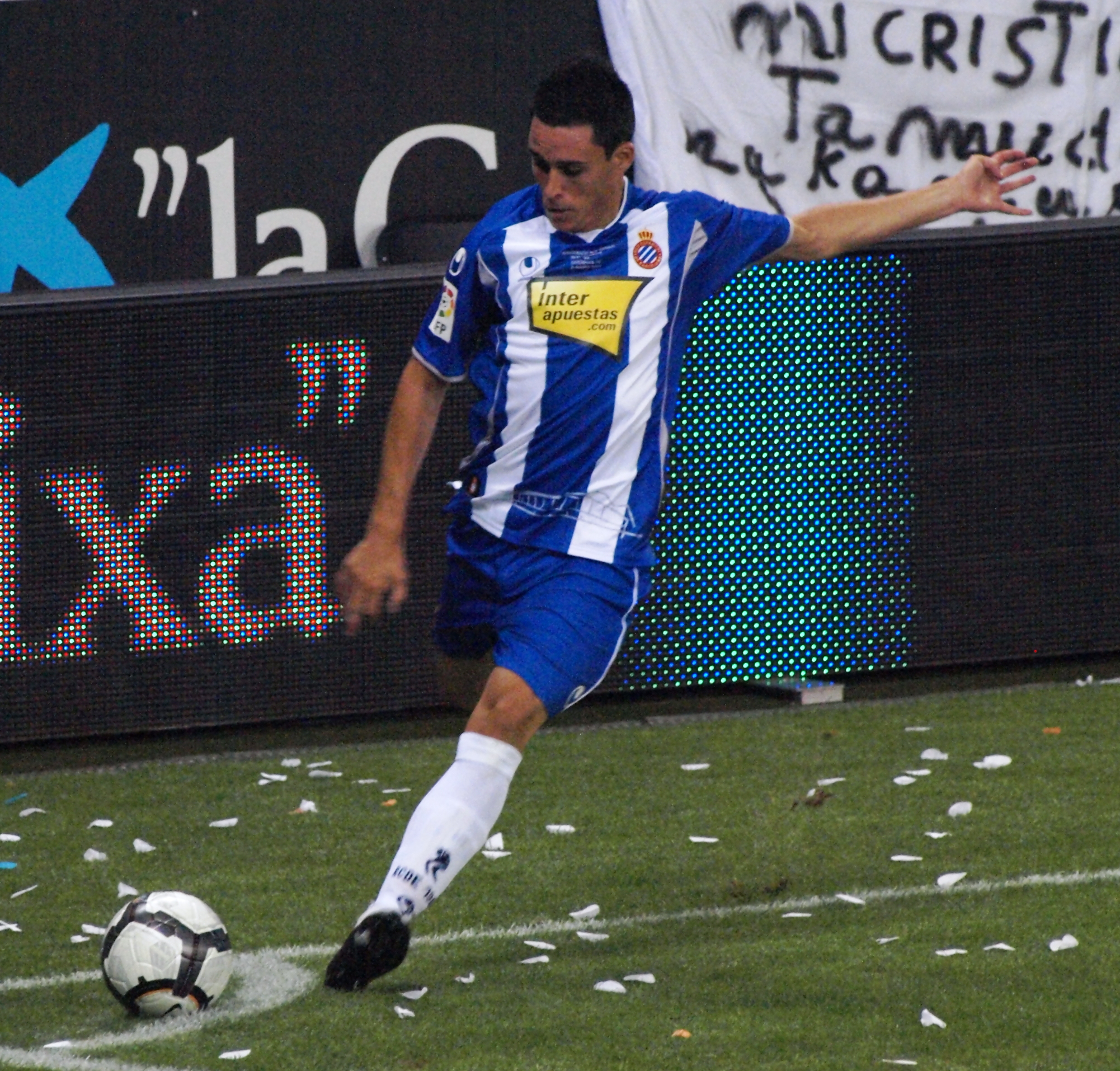
Callejón taking a corner for Espanyol in 2009

At the end of the season, Callejón left Real Madrid (with twin brother Juanmi) and signed a four-year contract with RCD Espanyol. He made his La Liga debut on 20 September 2008, as a late substitute in a 1–1 home draw against Getafe CF.

On 15 March 2009, as Espanyol struggled immensely in the league – eventually ranking in tenth position – Callejón scored his first goal for the Catalans in a 3–3 home draw to RCD Mallorca. He continued to be an undisputed starter under Mauricio Pochettino the following campaigns, operating mainly as a winger.

On 15 January 2011, Callejón scored twice to help to a 2–1 away defeat of Sevilla FC. He only missed one league game and netted six times for the Pericos, who finished comfortably in mid-table.

=== Return to Real Madrid ===
On 23 May 2011, Callejón re-joined Real Madrid on a five-year deal effective as of 1 July, for a reported fee of €5.5 million. On 16 July, he played his first match for them in a 4–1 friendly victory over the Los Angeles Galaxy, scoring the first goal of the game in the 30th minute.

On 2 October 2011, Callejón netted his first official goal for Real Madrid after coming on midway through the second half of an away fixture against former club Espanyol; he scored from a Cristiano Ronaldo assist in an eventual 4–0 win but did not celebrate the goal, instead raising his arms in the air in a mark of respect for his former employer.

Profiting from the fact that his team had already qualified from the UEFA Champions League group stage as leaders, Callejón was handed a rare start by manager José Mourinho on 22 November 2011, and responded by scoring a brace in a 6–2 home rout of NK Dinamo Zagreb. He added another two in the last round, at AFC Ajax (3–0).

As a starter, Callejón continued with his impressive scoring form: he scored once in a 6–2 away win over Sevilla on 17 December 2011, and in the tie against SD Ponferradina for the season's Copa del Rey he netted three of his team's seven aggregate goals, one away and two at home.

On 14 January 2012, Callejón scored the winner in a 2–1 defeat of Mallorca, helping the visitors come from behind with his 84th-minute long-range strike. He added another the following matchday, closing the score in a 4–1 home victory against Athletic Bilbao.

=== Napoli ===
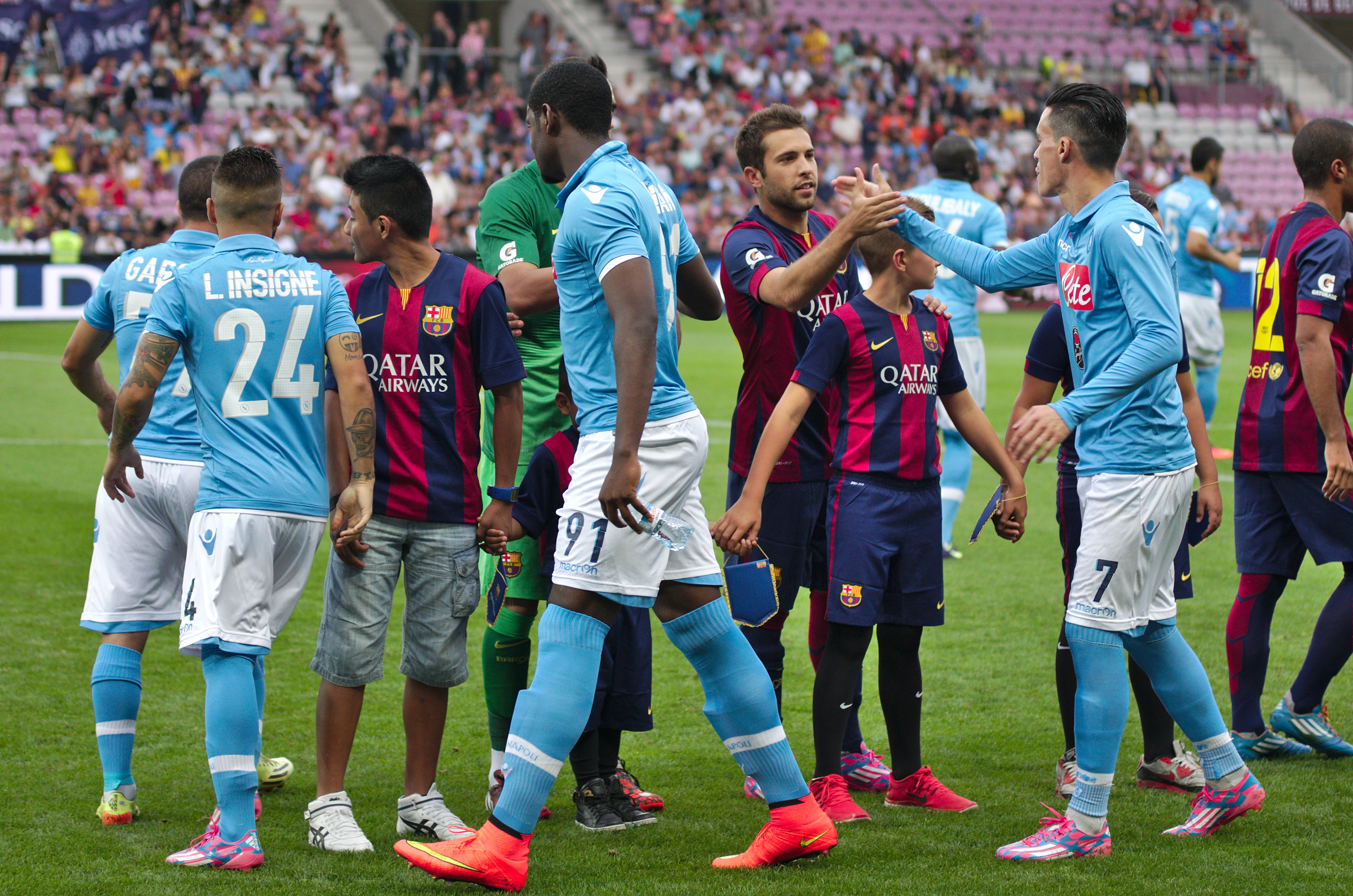
Callejón (wearing No.7) playing for Napoli against Barcelona, 2014

On 9 July 2013, Italian club SSC Napoli announced that they had reached an agreement for the transfer of Callejón for €10 million. The four-year deal was confirmed two days later.

Callejón scored in his Serie A debut on 25 August, netting the opener in a 3–0 home win over Bologna FC 1909, and went on to find the net a further seven times in his first 20 official appearances. On 22 October, he scored his first goal in Europe for his new team, grabbing his team's first in a 2–1 victory at Olympique de Marseille in the Champions League group stage.

On 3 May 2014, Callejón set up Dries Mertens for the third goal in a 3–1 win against ACF Fiorentina in the final of the Coppa Italia. He scored once in the final game of the season, a 5–1 home rout of Hellas Verona FC on 18 May; his strike after five minutes was Napoli's 100th goal in all competitions that season, and his 20th overall.

Callejón netted his first goal of 2014–15 on the opening day of the campaign, the opener in a 2–1 win over Genoa CFC. His second came on 24 September, as he scored at the stroke of half-time to put his side up 3–2 against US Città di Palermo in an eventual 3–3 home draw. On 19 October, he scored twice in a 2–2 draw at Inter Milan, with all four of the game's goals coming in the last 11 minutes.

In the Derby del Sole match against AS Roma on 2 November 2014, Callejón hit the post and had a shot saved off the line before eventually finding the net late on in the 2–0 victory. The strike took his league goal tally to eight on the season, two more than his closest competitors, and he was included in the Serie A Team of the Week lineup.

On 17 September 2015, Callejón scored twice in Napoli's first game of the UEFA Europa League group stage, a 5–0 home rout of Club Brugge KV. For the same competition, away to FC Midtjylland on 22 October, he volleyed a long pass from Kalidou Koulibaly to open a 4–1 victory; UEFA dubbed the latter effort an "early contender for goal of the group stage".

Callejón marked his 200th appearance for the Azzurri with his 57th goal on 9 April 2017, in a 3–0 league win against SS Lazio. His 300th came on 28 April 2019, in the 2–0 away victory over Frosinone Calcio.

In August 2020, the 33-year-old Callejón left the Stadio San Paolo after his contract expired.

=== Fiorentina ===
On 5 October 2020, Callejón agreed to a deal with Fiorentina. He scored twice in competitive matches during his spell, once in the league against UC Sampdoria (3–1 home win) and once in the domestic cup to help beat Calcio Padova 2–1 also at home.

=== Granada ===
Callejón returned to Spain on 25 July 2022 after nine years away, signing a one-year contract with Granada CF with the option of an extension based on sporting performance. He won the second tier in his first season, appearing in all 42 games.

=== Later career ===
In July 2024, aged 37, Callejón joined Primera Federación club Marbella FC. On 24 August, he scored the only goal as the hosts beat his former employers Castilla.

On 19 May 2025, Callejón announced that he would retire at the end of the season. Five days later, in his last appearance, he opened an eventual 2–0 home win over Antequera CF, with his team avoiding relegation with that result.

== International career ==
Callejón made his debut for the Spain under-21 team on 25 March 2008 against Kazakhstan in a 2009 UEFA European Under-21 Championship qualifier; he entered the field in the 46th minute after replacing Bojan Krkić, and scored shortly after in a 5–0 win.

On 7 November 2014, Callejón was called up to the full side for the first time, being picked by Vicente del Bosque for matches against Belarus and Germany. He made his debut on the 15th against the former, coming on for Santi Cazorla in the 69th minute of the 3–0 triumph in Huelva for the UEFA Euro 2016 qualifying phase.

== Style of play ==
A versatile, tenacious and hard-working right-footed player, Callejón was capable of playing anywhere along the front line, and was used as a forward or a winger on either flank, in the centre as an attacking midfielder and as a supporting striker. Although he usually occupied a position in or behind the main attacking line, due to his personality and ability to provide balance to his teams by linking-up play between the forwards and midfielders, he was also capable of playing in the centre as a main striker, and was also occasionally deployed in deeper roles under Mourinho during his time at Real Madrid, as a central midfielder or even as an attacking full-back or wing-back.

Speed, creativity and technical ability enabled Callejón to both create and score goals. He would characteristically lose his markers with attacking runs in behind the defensive line and into the area from deeper or wider areas, and head the ball in spite of his average stature.

== Personal life ==
Callejón's twin brother Juanmi was also a footballer, and both were Real Madrid graduates.

== Career statistics ==
=== Club ===
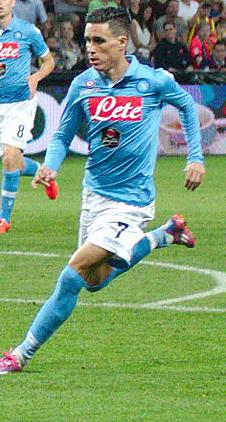
Callejón in action for Napoli in 2014

Appearances and goals by club, season and competition
Club	Season	League			Cup		Continental		Other (Note: Includes Supercopa de España and Supercoppa Italiana)		Total	
Club	Season	Division	Apps	Goals	Apps	Goals	Apps	Goals	Apps	Goals	Apps	Goals
Real Madrid B	2006–07	Segunda División	5	0	—		—		—		5	0
Real Madrid B	2007–08	Segunda División B	36	21	—		—		—		36	21
Real Madrid B	Total		41	21	—		—		—		41	21
Espanyol	2008–09	La Liga	24	2	6	2	—		—		30	4
Espanyol	2009–10	La Liga	36	2	1	0	—		—		37	2
Espanyol	2010–11	La Liga	37	6	2	0	—		—		39	6
Espanyol	Total		97	10	9	2	—		—		106	12
Real Madrid	2011–12	La Liga	25	5	5	3	5	5	1	0	36	13
Real Madrid	2012–13	La Liga	30	3	5	2	4	2	2	0	41	7
Real Madrid	Total		55	8	10	5	9	7	3	0	77	20
Napoli	2013–14	Serie A	37	15	5	3	10	2	—		52	20
Napoli	2014–15	Serie A	38	11	4	0	16	1	1	0	59	12
Napoli	2015–16	Serie A	38	7	2	1	7	5	—		47	13
Napoli	2016–17	Serie A	37	14	4	2	8	1	—		49	17
Napoli	2017–18	Serie A	38	10	2	0	10	2	—		50	12
Napoli	2018–19	Serie A	34	3	2	0	11	1	—		47	4
Napoli	2019–20	Serie A	33	4	5	0	7	0	—		45	4
Napoli	Total		255	64	24	6	69	12	1	0	349	82
Fiorentina	2020–21	Serie A	20	0	2	1	—		—		22	1
Fiorentina	2021–22	Serie A	30	1	3	0	—		—		33	1
Fiorentina	Total		50	1	5	1	—		—		55	2
Granada	2022–23	Segunda División	42	4	2	0	—		—		44	4
Granada	2023–24	La Liga	25	0	1	1	—		—		26	1
Granada	Total		67	4	3	1	—		—		70	5
Marbella	2024–25	Primera Federación	38	11	3	0	—		—		41	11
Career total			603	119	54	15	78	19	4	0	739	153

=== International ===
Appearances and goals by national team and year
National team	Year	Apps	Goals
Spain	2014	2	0
Spain	2015	0	0
Spain	2016	1	0
Spain	2017	2	0
Total		5	0

== Honours ==
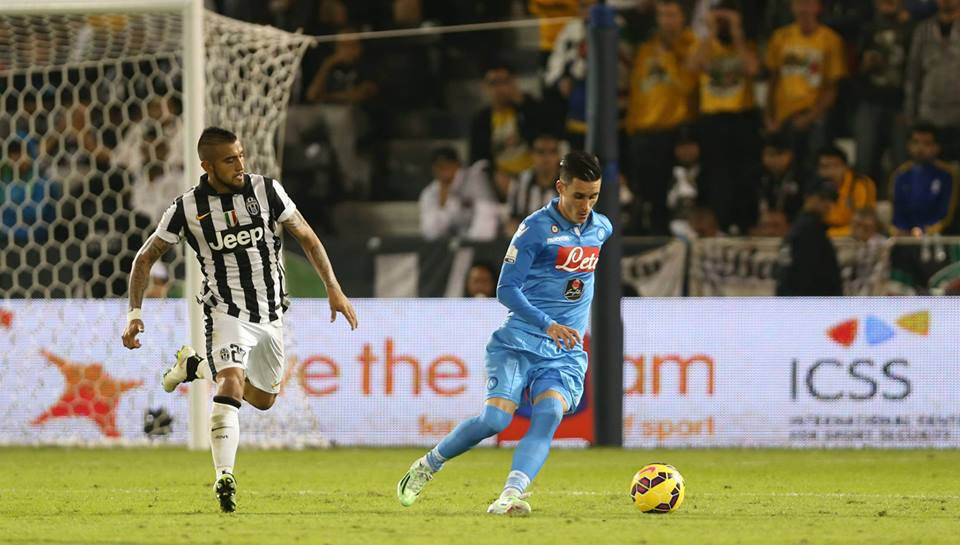
Callejón (right) on the ball in the 2014 Supercoppa Italiana

Real Madrid

- La Liga: 2011–12
- Supercopa de España: 2012

Napoli

- Coppa Italia: 2013–14, 2019–20
- Supercoppa Italiana: 2014

Granada

- Segunda División: 2022–23

Individual

- Segunda División B top scorer: 2007–08
- Coppa Italia top scorer: 2013–14
- Serie A top assist provider: 2016–17
