= Lorenzo Insigne =

Italian footballer (born 1991)

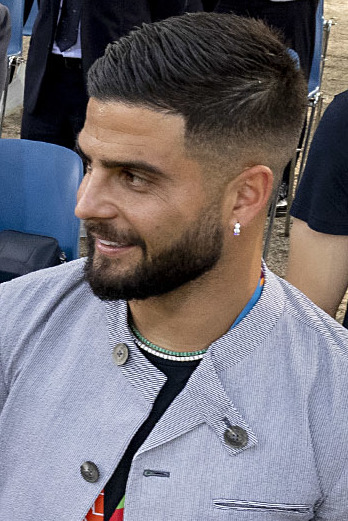
- Insigne in 2021

Personal information
- Full name: Lorenzo Insigne
- Date of birth: 4 June 1991 (age 35)
- Place of birth: Frattamaggiore, Naples, Italy
- Height: 1.63 m (5 ft 4 in)
- Positions: Left winger; attacking midfielder

Team information
- Current team: Sampdoria
- Number: 10

Youth career
- –2006: Olimpia Sant'Arpino
- 2006–2010: Napoli

Senior career*
Years	Team	Apps	(Gls)
2010–2022	Napoli	337	(96)
2010	→ Cavese (loan)	10	(0)
2010–2011	→ Foggia (loan)	33	(19)
2011–2012	→ Pescara (loan)	37	(18)
2022–2025	Toronto FC	66	(15)
2026	Pescara	13	(5)
2026–	Sampdoria	5	(3)

International career
2010–2011	Italy U20	5	(1)
2011–2013	Italy U21	15	(7)
2012–2022	Italy	54	(10)
Medal record
Men's Football
Representing Italy
UEFA European Championship
Winner	2020 Europe
UEFA Nations League
Third place	2021 Italy
UEFA European Under-21 Championship
Runner-up	2013 Israel
- * Club domestic league appearances and goals as of 23:05, 9 October 2026 (UTC)

Lorenzo Insigne Cavaliere OMRI (Italian pronunciation: [loˈrɛntso inˈsiɲɲe]; born 4 June 1991) is an Italian professional footballer who plays as a left winger or attacking midfielder for Serie B club Sampdoria. He is known in particular for his creativity, versatility, short height, speed and technical ability, as well as his accuracy from free kicks.

Insigne began his professional career with Napoli in 2009, making his Serie A debut in 2010, but was later sent on consecutive season loan spells to Cavese, Foggia and Pescara, before returning to Napoli in 2012. He helped the club win Coppa Italia titles in 2013–14 and 2019–20, finishing as the competition's top scorer in the former. In 2020–21, he was recognised as the best-performing player in Serie A according to performance data. After departing Napoli, he later moved to Major League Soccer side Toronto FC in 2022.

Insigne represented the Italy national under-21 team, with which he won a runner-up medal at the 2013 UEFA European Under-21 Championship. He made his debut for the senior team in September 2012, and represented Italy at the 2014 FIFA World Cup, UEFA Euro 2016, and UEFA Euro 2020, winning the latter tournament.

== Club career ==
=== Early career ===
In 2006, at age 15, Insigne was signed by Napoli from Olimpia Sant'Arpino for €1,500. In 2008, he made his debut for the Primavera team, with whom he scored 15 goals in the 2009–10 season. He was first called up to the first team under Roberto Donadoni, playing some friendlies in the summer of 2009, before making his Serie A debut under Walter Mazzarri, on 24 January 2010, in a 2–0 win away to Livorno. He played the remainder of the season on loan at Cavese in Lega Pro Prima Divisione, where he made 10 appearances.

==== Loans to Foggia and Pescara ====
The following season, Insigne was loaned to Foggia in Lega Pro Prima Divisione. He scored his first professional goal on 14 August, in the Coppa Italia Lega Pro match against L'Aquila, while on 29 August, he scored his first league goal in a 2–3 home defeat to Lucchese. Under the manager Zdeněk Zeman, he totalled 19 goals in the league, in addition to seven goals scored in Coppa Italia Lega Pro.

On 8 July 2011, he was loaned to Pescara in Serie B, now managed by Zeman. He made his debut in the Italian second division on 26 August 2011 in the opening round against Hellas Verona, and on 4 September scored his first goal for Pescara away against Modena. Insigne finished the season with 18 goals, making him the second top-scorer of the season behind teammate Ciro Immobile, and 14 assists. Among the key players of Pescara's title-winning season and promotion to Serie A, Insigne was subsequently awarded the "Best Player" of the Serie B season, along with teammates Immobile and Marco Verratti.

=== Napoli ===
At the end of the season, Insigne returned to Napoli, choosing the number 24 jersey. On 16 September 2012, he scored his first goal in Serie A, after entering as a substitute for Edinson Cavani in a 3–1 home win over Parma. Four days later, he made his debut in UEFA club competitions, starting in a 4–0 win against Swedish side AIK Fotboll in the UEFA Europa League. Insigne struggled to get a run of consecutive games at many points in the season, but participated in a large successful season at Napoli, who finished in second place in Serie A that season. Throughout the season, he made 43 appearances, scoring five goals and providing seven assists. The competition for places with players like Edinson Cavani, Goran Pandev, Eduardo Vargas and Omar El Kaddouri meant Insigne often started matches on the substitutes' bench.

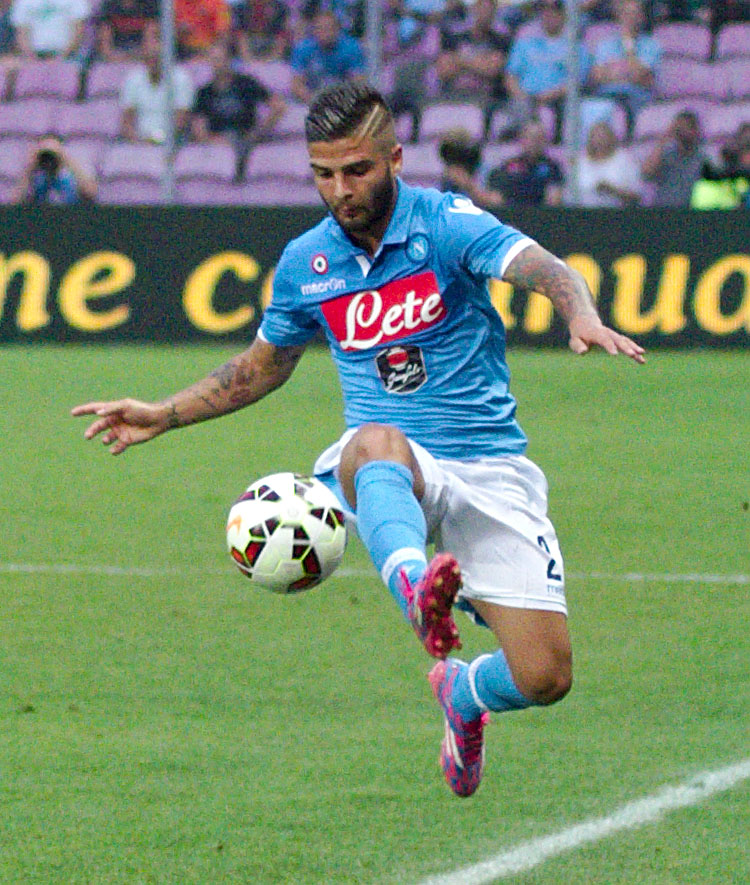
Insigne playing for Napoli in 2014

The following season, Insigne made his UEFA Champions League debut in 2–1 home win over the previous season's finalists Borussia Dortmund, on 18 September 2013. Insigne marked his debut in the competition with a goal from a free-kick. In the final of the Coppa Italia on 3 May 2014, Insigne scored twice in the first half as his side won 3–1 against Fiorentina. During the 2014–15 season, on 9 November 2014, Insigne injured the anterior cruciate ligament of his right knee in a match against Fiorentina. He returned to the pitch on 4 April 2015 after a five-month absence, coming on as a substitute in a 1–0 away defeat to Roma. In his next league match, on 26 April, he scored a goal in a 4–2 home win over Sampdoria, also wearing the captain's armband during the match, in the absence of teammates Marek Hamšík, Christian Maggio and Gökhan Inler.

On 13 September 2015, Insigne opened the 2015–16 Serie A season by scoring in a 2–2 draw against Empoli. On 20 September, he scored again in a 5–0 win over Lazio, also setting up Allan's goal. On 26 September, Insigne made his 100th Serie A appearance with Napoli and scored his third goal of the season in a 2–1 home win over defending Serie A champions Juventus, although he was also later forced off the pitch after sustaining an injury during the match; the club, however, later reported the injury was not serious. He continued his goalscoring run in the following match, scoring twice and setting up Allan's goal in a 4–0 away win over Milan, bringing his seasonal tally to five goals in seven games. Insigne's prolific performances even led to comparisons with former Napoli legend Diego Maradona, which Insigne played down.

In April 2017, Insigne scored his third brace in four appearances for Napoli to take his tally to 14 goals for the Serie A season, surpassing his previous personal best for a single campaign. On 14 October 2017, Insigne scored his 100th career club goal in a 1–0 away win over rivals Roma in Serie A. After Marek Hamšík's departure from the club in February 2019, Insigne was made the official captain of Napoli. On 24 August, in the opening game of the 2019–20 Serie A season, Insigne scored twice and set up two more goals in a 4–3 away win over Fiorentina.

On 13 June 2020, Insigne assisted Dries Mertens's equalising goal in a 1–1 home draw against Inter Milan in the second leg of 2019–20 Coppa Italia semi-final; the goal saw the Belgian overtake Hamšík to become Napoli's outright all-time leading goalscorer with 122 goals, while the result also allowed Napoli to advanced to the Coppa Italia Final. In the final on 17 June, Insigne netted Napoli's first spot-kick in a 4–2 penalty shoot-out victory against Juventus following a 0–0 draw after regulation time; Insigne went on to lift the trophy as the club's captain.

=== Toronto FC ===
On 8 January 2022, Insigne signed a pre-contract to join Major League Soccer club Toronto FC as a designated player on a free transfer and four-year contract that began on 1 July, with a reported annual salary of $15 million, making him the highest paid player in MLS.

He made his debut for the club on 23 July, in a 4–0 home victory against Charlotte FC, only featuring in the opening half, but setting up club captain Michael Bradley's second goal of the match with a back-heel pass. On 6 August, Insigne scored his first goal for the club, converting a shot from outside the box for the game-winning goal in a 4–3 away victory against Nashville SC. On 1 July 2025, he agreed to a mutual termination of the remainder of his contract with the club.

=== Return to Pescara ===
On 30 January 2026, Insigne returned to Pescara in the second-tier Serie B.

=== Sampdoria ===
On 8 July 2026 Insigne signed with Serie B side Sampdoria on a two-year contract with the option of a further year if he featured in 50% of Sampdoria's matches or if Sampdoria gained promotion to Serie A.

== International career ==
=== Youth ===
A regular member of the Italy under-21 squad, Insigne made 15 appearances for the "Azzurrini", scoring seven goals. He made his debut with the under-21 side on 6 October 2011 in a European qualifying match against Liechtenstein, scoring two goals and providing two assists in a 7–2 victory. With the under-21 team, he participated in the 2013 UEFA European Under-21 Championship under manager Devis Mangia, playing an important role in Italy's tournament run.

On 5 June 2013, he made his tournament debut against England, scoring a goal from a free-kick in Italy's 1–0 opening victory. On 9 June, in Italy's second match against hosts Israel, Insigne began the play which led to Italy's first goal of the match in the 18th minute, which was scored by Riccardo Saponara. He injured himself later during the match and was forced to come off, although Italy won the match 4–0. Insigne was able to recuperate in time for the semi-final match against the Netherlands, and he came on to set up Fabio Borini's winner which sent the Italians into the final. On 18 June, Italy was defeated 4–2 against Spain in the final, although Insigne was able to set up Italy's second goal of the match, which was scored by Borini.

=== Senior ===
At the age of 21 in September 2012, Insigne received his first call-up to the Italian senior team by coach Cesare Prandelli for its 2014 FIFA World Cup qualifying matches against Bulgaria and Malta. He made his senior debut on 11 September during the same tournament against the latter opponent in Modena, coming on as a substitute for Alessandro Diamanti. On 14 August 2013, Insigne scored his first goal in a friendly against Argentina, which ended in a 2–1 loss at the Stadio Olimpico in Rome. Insigne was named in Cesare Prandelli's 30-man provisional squad for the 2014 World Cup and was eventually picked in the final 23-man squad. In Italy's last warm-up match, against Fluminense in Brazil ahead of their World Cup opener against England, Insigne and his teammate Ciro Immobile scored five goals, with Insigne scoring two. On 20 June 2014, Insigne made his debut in the World Cup in Italy's second group match, against Costa Rica, replacing Antonio Candreva in the second half of the 1–0 defeat. However, this was Insigne's only appearance in the tournament, as Italy was eliminated in the group stage.

On 31 May 2016, Insigne was named to Antonio Conte's 23-man Italy squad for UEFA Euro 2016. He made his first appearance of the tournament on 22 June, coming off the bench in Italy's final group match, which ended in a 1–0 defeat to the Republic of Ireland, striking the post and later receiving a yellow card in injury time. In the round of 16, at the Stade de France in Paris on 27 June, he came off the bench once again to help set-up Graziano Pellè's 91st minute volley to give the Azzurri a 2–0 victory against defending champions Spain. On 2 July, he made a further substitute appearance in the quarter-final fixture against Germany and scored Italy's first penalty in the resulting shoot-out, which ended in a 6–5 loss against the reigning World Cup champions.

During Italy's goalless draw with Sweden on 13 November 2017, which resulted in Italy missing out on the World Cup for the first time since 1958, Insigne spent the entire game on the bench. Late in the match, midfielder Daniele De Rossi was asked to warm up, but refused and asked: "Why the hell should I go on? We don't need to draw, we need to win!", whilst inquiring why Insigne was not being prepared instead.

In June 2021, Insigne was included in Italy's squad for UEFA Euro 2020 by coach Roberto Mancini, and was later assigned the number 10 shirt. In the opening match of the tournament on 11 June, he scored Italy's final goal in a 3–0 victory against Turkey. On 2 July, he scored Italy's second goal of the match in a 2–1 victory against Belgium in the quarter-finals of the competition, with a curling right-footed effort from outside the box following an individual run; for his performance, he was named star of the match by UEFA, while the goal later placed second in UEFA's 2020–21 Goal of the Season, behind only Mehdi Taremi's overhead kick goal for Porto against Chelsea in the Champions League quarter-finals. On 11 July, after a 1–1 draw in extra-time, Insigne won the European Championship with Italy following a 3–2 penalty shoot-out victory against England at Wembley Stadium in the final. He started the match, but was replaced by Andrea Belotti in the second half of regulation time.

== Style of play ==
Nicknamed "Lorenzo Il Magnifico" ("Lorenzo the Magnificent", in Italian), Insigne is a fast, talented, skillful and diminutive right footed winger, with an eye for the goal, who is usually deployed on the left in a 4–3–3 or in a 4–2–3–1 formation, which allows him to utilise his acceleration to cut inside and curl shots on goal with his stronger foot, in particular from outside the penalty area. Due to his penchant for scoring goals in his manner, which according to Insigne was inspired by his "idol" Alessandro Del Piero's trademark goals, in 2021, the neologism tiraggiro – derived from "tir a gir" ("tiro a giro", in Italian, or "curling shot", in English) in Insigne's native Neapolitan dialect – was coined and included in the Italian encyclopedia Treccani. Although his preferred role is on the left flank, he is a hard-working, tactically intelligent, and versatile forward, capable of playing in any offensive position on either side of the pitch, or even through the centre; he is also known for his defensive contribution and ability to cover a lot of ground during matches, in addition to his offensive capabilities, despite his lack of physicality.

He has often operated in deeper, more creative positions, either in a free role in the centre as an attacking midfield playmaker behind the strikers, or as a supporting forward, due to his passing ability and vision, which enable him to link-up with midfielders, create chances, and provide assists for teammates. Insigne stated in 2012 that he preferred assisting goals over scoring them himself. He is also capable of playing in a more offensive central role as a false 9. In addition to his ability to set-up goals, he is also capable of scoring them himself, and is an accurate set-piece taker. Insigne's resulting low centre of gravity, combined with his creativity, quick feet and technical ability, make him extremely quick and agile in possession, and give him excellent balance and control of the ball, which, along with his flair, intelligent movement, speed, and dribbling skills, allows him to beat opponents and create space for his team in attacking areas, or make attacking runs off the ball into the box. Regarded as one of Italy's most promising prospects in his youth, due to his attributes, skill, pace and small stature, his former Napoli teammate and North Macedonia captain Goran Pandev has referred to him as the "Italian Messi"; he was also compared to former Napoli player Diego Maradona in his youth. Manager Delio Rossi also likened him to compatriots Fabrizio Miccoli – "for his turn of pace and cleverness" – and Gianfranco Zola in 2012. After scoring a goal, Insigne often celebrates by making a "heart" gesture with his hands.

== Personal life ==
Lorenzo Insigne has three brothers, all of whom are footballers: his younger brother Roberto, as well as Marco and Antonio. Lorenzo married Genoveffa "Jenny" Darone on 31 December 2012; they have three children together: Carmine, born on 4 April 2013, Christian, born on 13 March 2015, and Mattia, born on 29 May 2024.

== Career statistics ==
=== Club ===
As of match played 9 October 2026

Appearances and goals by club, season and competition
Club	Season	League			National cup (Note: Includes Coppa Italia, Coppa Italia Lega Pro and Canadian Championship)		Continental		Other		Total	
Club	Season	Division	Apps	Goals	Apps	Goals	Apps	Goals	Apps	Goals	Apps	Goals
Napoli	2009–10	Serie A	1	0	0	0	—		—		1	0
Napoli	2012–13	Serie A	37	5	1	0	5 (Note: All appearances in UEFA Europa League)	0	0	0	43	5
Napoli	2013–14	Serie A	36	3	5	3	10 (Note: Six appearances and two goals in UEFA Champions League, four appearances and one goal in UEFA Europa League)	3	—		51	9
Napoli	2014–15	Serie A	20	2	1	0	7 (Note: Two appearances in UEFA Champions League, five appearances in UEFA Europa League)	0	0	0	28	2
Napoli	2015–16	Serie A	37	12	0	0	5	1	—		42	13
Napoli	2016–17	Serie A	37	18	4	1	8 (Note: All appearances in UEFA Champions League)	1	—		49	20
Napoli	2017–18	Serie A	37	8	2	1	9 (Note: Seven appearances and four goals in UEFA Champions League, two appearances and one goal in UEFA Europa League)	5	—		48	14
Napoli	2018–19	Serie A	28	10	2	0	11 (Note: Six appearances and three goals in UEFA Champions League, five appearances and one goal in UEFA Europa League)	4	—		41	14
Napoli	2019–20	Serie A	37	8	4	3	5	2	—		46	13
Napoli	2020–21	Serie A	35	19	4	0	8	0	1 (Note: Appearance in Supercoppa Italiana)	0	48	19
Napoli	2021–22	Serie A	32	11	0	0	5	2	—		37	13
Napoli	Total		337	96	23	8	73	18	1	0	434	122
Cavese (loan)	2009–10	Lega Pro Prima Divisione	10	0	0	0	—		—		10	0
Foggia (loan)	2010–11	Lega Pro Prima Divisione	33	19	7	7	—		—		40	26
Pescara (loan)	2011–12	Serie B	37	18	1	2	—		—		38	20
Toronto FC	2022	MLS	11	6	1	0	—		—		12	6
Toronto FC	2023	MLS	20	4	1	1	—		0	0	21	5
Toronto FC	2024	MLS	23	4	4	1	—		3 (Note: Appearances in Leagues Cup)	2	30	7
Toronto FC	2025	MLS	12	1	1	0	—		—		13	1
Toronto FC	Total		66	15	7	2	—		3	2	76	19
Pescara	2025–26	Serie B	13	5	—		—		—		13	5
Sampdoria	2026–27	Serie B	5	3	0	0	—		—		5	3
Career total			501	156	38	19	73	18	4	2	616	195

=== International ===
Appearances and goals by national team and year
National team	Year	Apps	Goals
Italy	2012	1	0
Italy	2013	3	1
Italy	2014	2	0
Italy	2015	0	0
Italy	2016	7	1
Italy	2017	8	1
Italy	2018	9	1
Italy	2019	4	3
Italy	2020	4	0
Italy	2021	15	3
Italy	2022	1	0
Total		54	10

Scores and results list Italy's goal tally first, score column indicates score after each Insigne goal.

List of international goals scored by Lorenzo Insigne
No.	Date	Venue	Cap	Opponent	Score	Result	Competition
1	14 August 2013	Stadio Olimpico, Rome, Italy	2	Argentina	1–2	1–2	Friendly
2	24 March 2016	Stadio Friuli, Udine, Italy	7	Spain	1–0	1–1	Friendly
3	11 June 2017	Stadio Friuli, Udine, Italy	16	Liechtenstein	1–0	5–0	2018 FIFA World Cup qualification
4	27 March 2018	Wembley Stadium, London, England	23	England	1–1	1–1	Friendly
5	8 June 2019	Olympic Stadium, Athens, Greece	31	Greece	2–0	3–0	UEFA Euro 2020 qualifying
6	11 June 2019	Juventus Stadium, Turin, Italy	32	Bosnia and Herzegovina	1–1	2–1	UEFA Euro 2020 qualifying
7	15 November 2019	Bilino Polje Stadium, Zenica, Bosnia and Herzegovina	34	Bosnia and Herzegovina	2–0	3–0	UEFA Euro 2020 qualifying
8	4 June 2021	Stadio Renato Dall'Ara, Bologna, Italy	41	Czech Republic	3–0	4–0	Friendly
9	11 June 2021	Stadio Olimpico, Rome, Italy	42	Turkey	3–0	3–0	UEFA Euro 2020
10	2 July 2021	Allianz Arena, Munich, Germany	45	Belgium	2–0	2–1	UEFA Euro 2020

== Honours ==
Pescara

- Serie B: 2011–12

Napoli

- Coppa Italia: 2013–14, 2019–20
- Supercoppa Italiana: 2014

Italy U21

- UEFA European Under-21 Championship Runner-Up: 2013

Italy

- UEFA European Championship: 2020
- UEFA Nations League Third Place: 2020–21

Individual

- Serie B Footballer of the Year: 2012
- Coppa Italia Top Goalscorer: 2013–14
- Serie A Player of the Month: March 2021
- CIES Football Observatory Best Player in Serie A (performance data by InStat): 2020–21
- UEFA Europa League Goal of the Season: 2021–22

Orders

- 5th Class / Knight: Cavaliere Ordine al Merito della Repubblica Italiana: 2021

== Trivia ==
Insigne has contributed to popularising the term tiraggiro in Italy; following Insigne's goals and role in Italy's victorious Euro 2020 campaign, the word was subsequently included in the Treccani encyclopaedia in 2021, as a result of its recurring use as a reference to Insigne, or other players, using his trademark shooting technique, which usually involves him curling shots on goal from outside the box after cutting inside from the left flank onto his stronger right foot. The definition of the neologism is "the curling shot, taken hitting the ball so as to curve it with an inward curl", "adaptation of the spoken Neapolitan tir a ggir": excerpts of newspaper articles about Insigne are frequently cited as an example of the usage of this term.
