= Faouzi Ghoulam =

Footballer (born 1991)

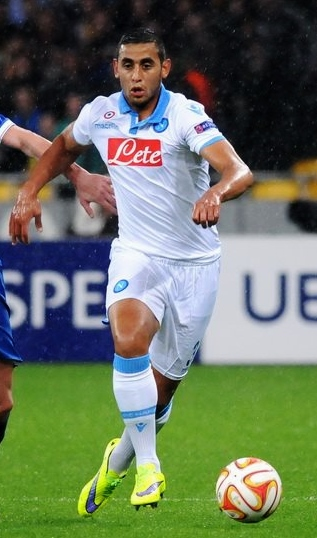
- Ghoulam playing for Napoli in 2015

Personal information
- Full name: Faouzi Ghoulam
- Date of birth: 1 February 1991 (age 35)
- Place of birth: Saint-Priest-en-Jarez, France
- Height: 1.88 m (6 ft 2 in)
- Position: Left-back

Team information
- Current team: TFC
- Number: 31

Youth career
- 1999–2010: Saint-Étienne

Senior career*
Years	Team	Apps	(Gls)
2010–2014	Saint-Étienne	87	(1)
2014–2022	Napoli	160	(3)
2023	Angers	7	(0)
2023–2024	Hatayspor	21	(1)
2025–	TFC	2	(1)

International career^{‡}
2012	France U21	2	(0)
2013–2017	Algeria	37	(5)
- * Club domestic league appearances and goals as of 1 September 2024 ‡ National team caps and goals as of 5 September 2017

Faouzi Ghoulam (Arabic: فوزي غلام (pronounced [fawzɪ ɣulaːm]); born 1 February 1991) is a professional footballer who plays for TFC as a left-back.

Born in France, Ghoulam is a former Algeria international, scoring five goals in 37 appearances for the national team from 2013 to 2017.

== Early life ==
Ghoulam was born in Saint-Priest-en-Jarez to Algerian parents. His father is from Batna, while his mother is from Annaba. He has eight brothers and two sisters, and his brother Nabil is a cross country runner that represented France at the 2004 IAAF World Cross Country Championships.

== Club career ==
On 22 September 2010, Ghoulam made his professional debut for AS Saint-Étienne coming as a substitute in the 82nd minute of a Coupe de la Ligue match against Nice. He made his Ligue 1 debut in a round 13 clash against Valenciennes and went on to make another 11 appearances in his breakout season with Saint-Etienne, becoming a consistent starter by the end of the season. Over the next two and a half seasons, he made another 65 league appearances.

In the winter of 2014, Ghoulam moved to S.S.C. Napoli. He became an immediate starter at Napoli under Rafael Benítez and helped the side finish in third place in Serie A during the 2013–14 season, also capturing the Coppa Italia.

In November 2017, Ghoulam suffered an anterior cruciate ligament rupture in a Champions League group-stage fixture against Manchester City and was expected to be ruled out for at least two months; in January 2018, however, he underwent medical tests and resumed training ahead of schedule.

On 31 January 2023, Ghoulam joined Angers in Ligue 1 as a free agent until the end of the 2022–23 season.

After Angers was relegated to the Ligue 2, Ghoulam moved to Hatayspor in the Turkish top division on a one-year contract.

== International career ==
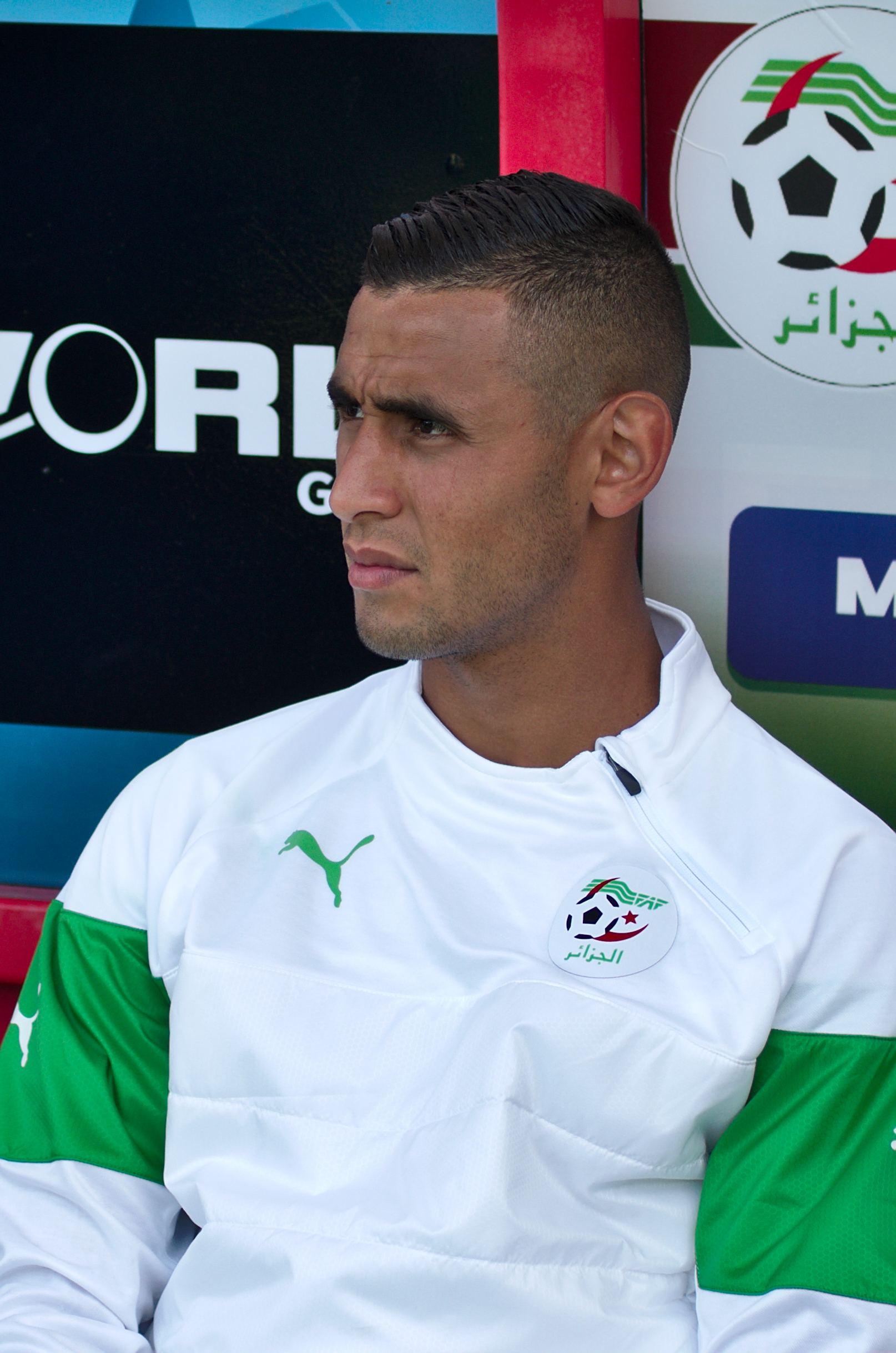
Ghoulam with Algeria national team during a match against Armenia.

On 18 December 2010, in an interview Algerian newspaper Le Buteur, Ghoulam said that his intentions were to represent Algeria in international competition despite being born in France. On 5 May 2011, Algerian under-23 coach Azzedine Aït Djoudi announced that Ghoulam was hesitant about joining the team, despite the fact that he was the one who contacted the Algerian Football Federation. On 6 October 2011, after being called up to the preliminary squad of the France under-21 team, Ghoulam said that he would be really proud to play for the team.

On 23 November 2012, in an interview following a league game against Valenciennes, Ghoulam announced that he was going to represent Algeria at the 2013 Africa Cup of Nations. A few days later, the Algerian Football Federation confirmed the information through a press release on its website. Ghoulam was selected in the Algeria squad for the 2013 Africa Cup of Nations in South Africa but he did not participate in any games. On 26 March 2013, Ghoulam made his debut as a starter in a 3–1 win over Benin in the 2014 FIFA World Cup qualifiers, providing the assist on the first Algerian goal.

Ghoulam represented Algeria at the 2014 World Cup finals as les Fennecs reached the round of 16, where they were beaten by eventual champions Germany after extra time. He started in both the match against Germany and the 2–1 group stage loss to Belgium.

In Algeria's opening match of the 2015 Africa Cup of Nations, Ghoulam scored his first international goal to give the team a 2–1 lead in an eventual 3–1 victory over South Africa.

== Career statistics ==
=== Club ===
As of match played 1 July 2023

Appearances and goals by club, season and competition
Club	Season	League			National cup		League cup		Europe		Other		Total	
Club	Season	Division	Apps	Goals	Apps	Goals	Apps	Goals	Apps	Goals	Apps	Goals	Apps	Goals
Saint-Étienne	2010–11	Ligue 1	12	0	0	0	1	0	—		—		13	0
Saint-Étienne	2011–12	Ligue 1	32	0	1	0	1	0	—		—		34	0
Saint-Étienne	2012–13	Ligue 1	26	0	2	0	3	0	—		—		31	0
Saint-Étienne	2013–14	Ligue 1	17	1	1	0	1	0	—		—		19	1
Saint-Étienne	Total		87	1	4	0	6	0	—		—		97	1
Napoli	2013–14	Serie A	15	0	3	0	—		3 (Note: Appearance(s) in UEFA Europa League)	0	—		21	0
Napoli	2014–15	Serie A	21	0	3	0	—		14 (Note: One appearance in UEFA Champions League, thirteen appearances in UEFA Europa League)	0	1 (Note: Appearance in Supercoppa Italiana)	0	39	0
Napoli	2015–16	Serie A	34	0	0	0	—		4	0	—		38	0
Napoli	2016–17	Serie A	29	0	1	0	—		8 (Note: Appearance(s) in UEFA Champions League)	0	—		38	0
Napoli	2017–18	Serie A	11	2	0	0	—		6	0	—		17	2
Napoli	2018–19	Serie A	16	1	1	0	—		4 (Note: One appearance in UEFA Champions League, three appearances in UEFA Europa League)	0	—		21	1
Napoli	2019–20	Serie A	9	0	0	0	—		0	0	—		9	0
Napoli	2020–21	Serie A	11	0	1	0	—		5	0	0	0	17	0
Napoli	2021–22	Serie A	14	0	1	0	—		1	0	—		16	0
Napoli	Total		160	3	10	0	—		45	0	1	0	216	3
Angers	2022–23	Ligue 1	7	0	1	0	—		—		—		8	0
Hatayspor	2023–24	Süper Lig	21	1	3	0	—		—		—		24	1
Career total			275	5	18	0	6	0	45	0	1	0	345	4

=== International ===
Scores and results list Algeria's goal tally first, score column indicates score after each Ghoulam goal.

List of international goals scored by Faouzi Ghoulam
No.	Date	Venue	Opponent	Score	Result	Competition
1	19 January 2015	Estadio de Mongomo, Mongomo, Equatorial Guinea	South Africa	3–1	3–1	2015 Africa Cup of Nations
2	6 September 2015	Setsoto Stadium, Maseru, Lesotho	Lesotho	1–0	3–1	2017 Africa Cup of Nations qualification
3	17 November 2015	Stade Mustapha Tchaker, Blida, Algeria	Tanzania	2–0	7–0	2018 FIFA World Cup qualification
4	17 November 2015	Stade Mustapha Tchaker, Blida, Algeria	Tanzania	5–0	7–0	2018 FIFA World Cup qualification
5	29 March 2016	Addis Ababa Stadium, Addis Ababa, Ethiopia	Ethiopia	3–3	3–3	2017 Africa Cup of Nations qualification

== Honours ==
Saint-Étienne

- Coupe de la Ligue: 2013

Napoli

- Coppa Italia: 2013–14, 2019–20
- Supercoppa Italiana: 2014

Individual

- UEFA Europa League Squad of the Season: 2014–15
- Algerian Footballer of the Year: 2017
- France Football Africa Team of the Year: 2017
