= Lorenzo Tonelli =

Italian footballer

Personal information
- Date of birth: 17 January 1990 (age 36)
- Place of birth: Florence, Italy
- Height: 1.83 m (6 ft 0 in)
- Position: Centre-back

Youth career
- 2000–2010: Empoli

Senior career*
Years	Team	Apps	(Gls)
2010–2016	Empoli	159	(14)
2016–2020	Napoli	6	(3)
2018–2019	→ Sampdoria (loan)	19	(1)
2020–2021	Sampdoria	32	(1)
2021–2024	Empoli	15	(0)

International career
2006	Italy U16	3	(0)
2010	Italy U21	1	(0)
- * Club domestic league appearances and goals

Lorenzo Tonelli (born 17 January 1990) is an Italian former professional footballer who played as a centre-back.

== Club career ==
Born in Florence, Tuscany, Tonelli started his professional career at Empoli. He made his debut during the 2010–11 Serie B season, marking his first appearance on 5 September 2010.

On 26 April 2015, Tonelli was punched by Atalanta's Germán Denis after he burst into the Empoli dressing room. Denis was subsequently given a five-match ban for this action against Tonelli.

Tonelli enjoyed his breakthrough in the 2014–15 season under then manager Maurizio Sarri, attracting the attention of some of the top Italian teams. On 23 May 2016, it was announced that Tonelli had signed for Napoli. The transfer fee was reported as being €10 million. On 7 January 2017, Tonelli made his Napoli debut, scoring the match-winning goal in the 95th minute of a 2–1 home win over Sampdoria.

On 17 August 2018, Tonelli joined Serie A side Sampdoria on loan until 30 June 2019.

On 23 January 2020, he joined Sampdoria on another loan until the end of the 2019–20 season, at the end of which Sampdoria will have an obligation to purchase his rights permanently. He also signed a contract with Sampdoria until 30 June 2022.

On 27 August 2021, Tonelli return to Empoli after 5 years.

== International career ==
Under the new regime of Ciro Ferrara, he received his first call-up for Italy U-21 on 11 November 2010. He made his debut on 17 November 2010, replacing Giulio Donati in the second half of the friendly match, winning against Turkey U21 2–1. He was called up for an Italy training camp on 16 May 2016. He was given his first official senior call-up for Italy in October 2018 by manager Roberto Mancini, following injuries to several players in the team.

== Career statistics ==
As of match played 22 May 2022

Appearances and goals by club, season and competition
Club	Season	League			National cup		Continental		Other		Total	
Club	Season	Division	Apps	Goals	Apps	Goals	Apps	Goals	Apps	Goals	Apps	Goals
Empoli	2010–11	Serie B	16	0	1	0	—		—		17	0
Empoli	2011–12	Serie B	16	0	3	1	—		—		19	1
Empoli	2012–13	Serie B	36	4	1	0	—		4	0	41	4
Empoli	2013–14	Serie B	37	3	2	0	—		—		39	3
Empoli	2014–15	Serie A	28	5	2	0	—		—		30	5
Empoli	2015–16	Serie A	26	2	1	0	—		—		27	2
Empoli	Total		159	14	10	1	0	0	4	0	173	15
Napoli	2016–17	Serie A	3	2	0	0	—		—		3	2
Napoli	2017–18	Serie A	4	1	0	0	2	0	—		6	1
Napoli	Total		7	3	0	0	2	0	0	0	9	3
Sampdoria (loan)	2018–19	Serie A	19	1	1	0	—		—		20	1
Sampdoria (loan)	2019–20	Serie A	9	0	0	0	—		—		9	0
Sampdoria (loan)	2020–21	Serie A	23	1	0	0	—		—		23	1
Sampdoria (loan)	Total		51	2	1	0	0	0	0	0	52	2
Empoli	2021–22	Serie A	14	0	0	0	—		—		14	0
Career total			231	19	11	1	2	0	4	0	248	20
