= 2019–20 SSC Napoli season =

Napoli
2019–20 season
- President: Aurelio De Laurentiis
- Manager: Carlo Ancelotti (until 10 December); Gennaro Gattuso (from 11 December)
- Stadium: Stadio San Paolo
- Serie A: 7th
- Coppa Italia: Winners
- UEFA Champions League: Round of 16
- Top goalscorer: League: Arkadiusz Milik (11); All: Dries Mertens (16)
Home colours	Away colours	Third colours

The 2019–20 season was Società Sportiva Calcio Napoli's 74th season in Serie A. Following a 2nd-place finish the previous season, the club competed in three competitions: Serie A, the Coppa Italia, and the UEFA Champions League, starting in the round of 16 and the group stage in the latter two competitions, respectively.

The season was coach Carlo Ancelotti's second in charge, following his appointment in May 2018 to replace Maurizio Sarri, but he was sacked on 10 December after a poor run of results, and replaced by Gennaro Gattuso the following day.

== Players ==
=== Squad information ===
Last updated on 9 February 2020
Appearances include league matches only

No.	Player	Nat.	Position(s)	Date of birth (age)	Signed from	Signed in	Contract ends	Apps	Goals
Goalkeepers
1	Alex Meret	(Italy)	GK	22 March 1997 (age 29)	(Italy) Udinese	2018	2023	29	0
25	David Ospina	(Colombia)	GK	31 August 1988 (age 38)	(England) Arsenal	2019	2022	25	0
27	Orestis Karnezis	(Greece)	GK	11 July 1985 (age 41)	(Italy) Udinese	2019	2021	9	0
Defenders
2	Kévin Malcuit	(France)	RB / RM / RW	31 July 1991 (age 35)	(France) Lille	2018	2022	27	0
6	Mário Rui	(Portugal)	LB	27 May 1991 (age 35)	(Italy) Roma	2017	2022	58	3
13	Sebastiano Luperto	(Italy)	CB / LB	6 September 1996 (age 30)	(Italy) Youth Sector	2015	2023	22	0
19	Nikola Maksimović	(Serbia)	CB	25 November 1991 (age 34)	(Italy) Torino	2016	2021	36	2
22	Giovanni Di Lorenzo	(Italy)	RB	4 August 1993 (age 33)	(Italy) Empoli	2019	2024	22	1
23	Elseid Hysaj	(Albania)	RB	2 February 1994 (age 32)	(Italy) Empoli	2015	2021	145	0
26	Kalidou Koulibaly	(Senegal)	CB	20 June 1991 (age 35)	(Belgium) Genk	2014	2023	173	10
31	Faouzi Ghoulam	(Algeria)	LB	1 February 1991 (age 35)	(France) Saint-Étienne	2014	2022	131	3
44	Kostas Manolas	(Greece)	CB	14 June 1991 (age 35)	(Italy) Roma	2019	2024	16	2
Midfielders
4	Diego Demme	(Germany)	DM / RB / CM	21 November 1991 (age 34)	(Germany) RB Leipzig	2020	2024	4	1
5	Allan	(Brazil)	CM	8 January 1991 (age 35)	(Italy) Udinese	2015	2023	149	9
8	Fabián Ruiz	(Spain)	CM	3 April 1996 (age 30)	(Spain) Real Betis	2018	2023	46	6
12	Eljif Elmas	(North Macedonia)	CM / AM	24 September 1999 (age 26)	(Turkey) Fenerbahçe	2019	2024	13	1
20	Piotr Zieliński	(Poland)	CM / RW / LW	20 May 1994 (age 32)	(Italy) Udinese	2016	2021	131	17
34	Amin Younes	(Germany)	AM / LW / RW	6 August 1993 (age 33)	(Netherlands) Ajax	2018	2023	18	3
68	Stanislav Lobotka	(Slovakia)	DM / CM	25 November 1994 (age 31)	(Spain) Celta Vigo	2020	2024	3	0
Forwards
7	José Callejón	(Spain)	RW	11 February 1987 (age 39)	(Spain) Real Madrid	2013	2020	244	62
9	Fernando Llorente	(Spain)	CF	26 February 1985 (age 41)	(England) Tottenham Hotspur	2019	2021	17	3
11	Hirving Lozano	(Mexico)	LW / RW	30 July 1995 (age 31)	(Netherlands) PSV Eindhoven	2019	2024	16	2
14	Dries Mertens	(Belgium)	CF / ST / LW	6 May 1987 (age 39)	(Netherlands) PSV Eindhoven	2013	2020	223	89
21	Matteo Politano	(Italy)	LW / RW / ST	3 August 1993 (age 33)	(Italy) Internazionale (loan)	2020	2022	2	0
24	Lorenzo Insigne	(Italy)	LW	4 June 1991 (age 35)	(Italy) Youth Sector	2009	2022	255	62
99	Arkadiusz Milik	(Poland)	CF / ST	28 February 1994 (age 32)	(Netherlands) Ajax	2016	2021	81	36
Players transferred during the season
9	Simone Verdi	(Italy)	AM / LW / RW	12 July 1992 (age 34)	(Italy) Bologna	2018	2023	22	3
11	Adam Ounas	(Algeria)	RW	11 November 1996 (age 29)	(France) Bordeaux	2017	2022	25	3
21	Vlad Chiricheș	(Romania)	CB	14 November 1989 (age 36)	(England) Tottenham Hotspur	2015	2022	31	3
62	Lorenzo Tonelli	(Italy)	CB	17 January 1990 (age 36)	(Italy) Empoli	2016	2021	7	3
70	Gianluca Gaetano	(Italy)	AM / CM	5 May 2000 (age 26)	(Italy) Youth Sector	2018	2023	2	0

== Transfers ==
=== In ===
Date	Pos.	Player	Age	Moving from	Fee	Notes	Source
7 June 2019	DF	(Italy) Giovanni Di Lorenzo	25	(Italy) Empoli	Undisclosed		
30 June 2019	DF	(Greece) Kostas Manolas	28	(Italy) Roma	€36M		
4 July 2019	GK	(Colombia) David Ospina	30	(England) Arsenal	N/A	Undisclosed terms	
13 July 2019	MF	(Italy) Filippo Costa	24	(Italy) SPAL	Undisclosed	Undisclosed terms	
23 July 2019	MF	(North Macedonia) Eljif Elmas	19	(Turkey) Fenerbahçe	€16M		
23 August 2019	FW	(Mexico) Hirving Lozano	24	(Netherlands) PSV Eindhoven	€42M	Five-year contract	
2 September 2019	FW	(Spain) Fernando Llorente	34	Free agent	Free		
11 January 2020	MF	(Germany) Diego Demme	28	(Germany) RB Leipzig	€12M		
15 January 2020	MF	(Slovakia) Stanislav Lobotka	25	(Spain) Celta Vigo	€20M	Four-year contract	
20 January 2020	DF	(Kosovo) Amir Rrahmani	25	(Italy) Hellas Verona	€14M	Four-year contract	
30 January 2020	FW	(Italy) Andrea Petagna	24	(Italy) SPAL	€17M		

==== Loans in ====
Date	Pos.	Player	Age	Moving from	Fee	Notes	Source
28 January 2020	FW	(Italy) Matteo Politano	26	(Italy) Internazionale	N/A	Two year loan with obligation to buy	

=== Out ===
Date	Pos.	Player	Age	Moving to	Fee	Notes	Source
1 June 2019	FW	(Italy) Roberto Insigne	25	(Italy) Benevento	N/A	Two-year contract	
1 July 2019	MF	(Guinea) Amadou Diawara	21	(Italy) Roma	€21M	Five-year contract	
4 July 2019	DF	(Spain) Raúl Albiol	33	(Spain) Villarreal	Free	Three-year contract	
20 July 2019	MF	(Brazil) Carlos Vinícius	24	(Portugal) Benfica	€17M	Five-year contract	

==== Loans out ====
Date	Pos.	Player	Age	Moving to	Fee	Notes	Source
10 July 2019	MF	(Italy) Alberto Grassi	24	(Italy) Parma	N/A	One year loan with obligation to buy	
10 July 2019	GK	(Italy) Luigi Sepe	28	(Italy) Parma	N/A	One year loan with obligation to buy	
13 July 2019	MF	(Italy) Filippo Costa	24	(Italy) Bari	N/A	Two year loan	
13 July 2019	MF	(Italy) Michael Folorunsho	21	(Italy) Bari	N/A	Two year loan	
16 July 2019	FW	(Italy) Roberto Inglese	27	(Italy) Parma	Loan	Loan with an obligation to buy	
23 July 2019	MF	(Croatia) Marko Rog	24	(Italy) Cagliari	Loan	Loan with an obligation to buy	
30 August 2019	FW	(Algeria) Adam Ounas	22	(France) Nice	Loan	Loan with an option to buy	
2 September 2019	DF	(Romania) Vlad Chiricheș	29	(Italy) Sassuolo	Loan	Loan with an option to buy	
2 September 2019	FW	(Italy) Simone Verdi	27	(Italy) Torino	€4M	€4M loan with a €21M obligation to buy	
20 January 2020	DF	(Kosovo) Amir Rrahmani	25	(Italy) Hellas Verona	Loan	Loan for the remainder of the season	
30 January 2020	FW	(Italy) Andrea Petagna	24	(Italy) SPAL	Loan	Loan for the remainder of the season	

== Pre-season and friendlies ==
13 July 2019 Friendly	Napoli (Italy)	1–2	(Italy) Benevento	Dimaro, Italy
21:00 CEST	Callejón 20'	Report	Coda 35'; Vokić 89'	Stadium: Stadio Comunale; Referee: Andrea Bordin

19 July 2019 Friendly	Napoli (Italy)	5–0	(Italy) Feralpisalò	Dimaro, Italy
21:00 CEST	Manolas 5'; Verdi 53', 52'; Tonelli 59'; Tutino 84'	Report		Stadium: Stadio Comunale

24 July 2019 Friendly	Napoli (Italy)	3–3	(Italy) Cremonese	Dimaro, Italy
21:00 CEST	Insigne 37' (pen.); Verdi 54'; Younes 70'	Report	Mogos 11'; Arini 42'; Soddimo 77'	Stadium: Stadio Comunale

28 July 2019 Friendly	Liverpool (England)	0–3	(Italy) Napoli	Edinburgh, Scotland
17:00 CEST		Report	Insigne 17'; Milik 28'; Younes 52'	Stadium: Murrayfield Stadium; Attendance: 65,442; Referee: Bobby Madden (Scotland)

4 August 2019 Friendly	Marseille (France)	0–1	(Italy) Napoli	Marseille, France
21:00 CEST	Amavi (yellow card) 50'; Sakai (yellow card) 75'; Payet (yellow card) 76'	Report	Mertens 38', (yellow card) 44'; Maksimović (yellow card) 90'	Stadium: Stade Vélodrome; Referee: Jérémie Pignard (France)

7 August 2019 La Liga-Serie A Cup	Barcelona (Spain)	2–1	(Italy) Napoli	Miami, United States
19:00 EST	Busquets 38'; Wagué (yellow card) 47'; Junior (yellow card) 77'; Rakitić 79'	Report	Umtiti 42' (o.g.); Milik (yellow card) 70'; Hysaj (yellow card) 82'	Stadium: Hard Rock Stadium; Attendance: 57,062; Referee: Ted Unkel (United States)

10 August 2019 La Liga-Serie A Cup	Napoli (Italy)	0–4 (1–6 agg.)	(Spain) Barcelona	Ann Arbor, United States
19:00 EST	Mário Rui (yellow card) 73'	Report	Suárez 48', 58'; Semedo (yellow card) 53'; Griezmann 56'; Dembélé 63'	Stadium: Michigan Stadium; Attendance: 60,043; Referee: Rubiel Vazquez (United States)

== Competitions ==
=== Serie A ===
==== League table ====
Pos	Team	Pld	W	D	L	GF	GA	GD	Pts	Qualification or relegation
5	Roma	38	21	7	10	77	51	+26	70	Qualification for the Europa League group stage
6	Milan	38	19	9	10	63	46	+17	66	Qualification for the Europa League second qualifying round
7	Napoli	38	18	8	12	61	50	+11	62	Qualification for the Europa League group stage (Note: Napoli qualified for the Europa League group stage by winning the 2019–20 Coppa Italia.)
8	Sassuolo	38	14	9	15	69	63	+6	51	
9	Hellas Verona	38	12	13	13	47	51	−4	49 (Note: Positions determined by head-to-head points: Hellas Verona: 10 pts; Fiorentina: 5 pts; Parma: 1 pt.)	

Source: Serie A, Soccerway
Rules for classification: 1) Points; 2) Head-to-head points; 3) Head-to-head goal difference; 4) Goal difference; 5) Goals scored; 6) Draw. (Note: Head-to-head record is used only after all the matches between the teams in question have been played)

==== Results summary ====
Overall								Home						Away					
Pld	W	D	L	GF	GA	GD	Pts	W	D	L	GF	GA	GD	W	D	L	GF	GA	GD
38	18	8	12	61	50	+11	62	10	3	5	30	22	+8	8	5	7	31	28	+3

Source: Competitive matches

==== Results by round ====
Round	1	2	3	4	5	6	7	8	9	10	11	12	13	14	15	16	17	18	19	20	21	22	23	24	25	26	27	28	29	30	31	32	33	34	35	36	37	38
Ground	A	A	H	A	H	H	A	H	A	H	A	H	A	H	A	H	A	H	A	H	H	A	H	A	A	H	A	H	A	H	A	H	A	H	A	H	A	H
Result	W	L	W	W	L	W	D	W	D	D	L	D	D	L	D	L	W	L	L	L	W	W	L	W	W	W	W	W	L	W	W	D	D	W	L	W	L	W
Position	3	10	4	3	4	4	4	4	4	6	7	7	7	7	7	8	8	8	11	11	10	10	11	9	6	6	6	6	6	6	6	6	6	6	7	7	7	7

Source: Competitive matches
A = Away; H = Home; W = Win; D = Draw; L = Loss

==== Matches ====
24 August 2019 1	Fiorentina	3–4	Napoli	Florence
20:45 CEST (UTC+02:00)	Pulgar 9' (pen.); Milenković 52'; Boateng 65', (yellow card) 90+3'; Pezzella (yellow card) 90+5'	Report	Allan (yellow card) 19'; Callejón (yellow card) 20', (goal) 56'; Mário Rui (yellow card) 24'; Mertens 38'; Insigne 43' (pen.), 67'; Zieliński (yellow card) 90+1'	Stadium: Stadio Artemio Franchi; Attendance: 33,614; Referee: Davide Massa

31 August 2019 2	Juventus	4–3	Napoli	Turin
20:45 CEST (UTC+02:00)	Danilo 16'; Higuaín 19'; Matuidi (yellow card) 52'; Ronaldo 62'; Alex Sandro (yellow card) 80'; Douglas Costa (yellow card) 83'; Koulibaly 90+2' (o.g.)	Report	Ghoulam (yellow card) 40'; Di Lorenzo (yellow card) 44', (goal) 81'; Manolas 66'; Lozano 68'; Elmas (yellow card) 90+1'	Stadium: Allianz Stadium; Attendance: 39,203; Referee: Daniele Orsato

14 September 2019 3	Napoli	2–0	Sampdoria	Naples
18:00 CEST (UTC+02:00)	Maksimović (yellow card) 7'; Mertens 13', 67'; Fabián (yellow card) 37'	Report	Ferrari (yellow card) 26'; Caprari (yellow card) 41'	Stadium: Stadio San Paolo; Attendance: 32,679; Referee: Federico La Penna

22 September 2019 4	Lecce	1–4	Napoli	Lecce
15:00 CEST (UTC+02:00)	Tachtsidis (yellow card) 37'; Gabriel (yellow card) 38'; Tabanelli (yellow card) 49'; Mancosu 61' (pen.)	Report	Ghoulam (yellow card) 22'; Llorente 28', 82'; Insigne 40' (pen.); Elmas (yellow card) 45+1'; Fabián 52', (yellow card) 53'	Stadium: Stadio Via del Mare; Attendance: 21,644; Referee: Marco Piccinini

25 September 2019 5	Napoli	0–1	Cagliari	Naples
21:00 CEST (UTC+02:00)	Allan (yellow card) 37'; Koulibaly (red card) 89'	Report	Rog (yellow card) 30'; Castro 88'	Stadium: Stadio San Paolo; Attendance: 25,408; Referee: Marco Di Bello

29 September 2019 6	Napoli	2–1	Brescia	Naples
12:30 CEST (UTC+02:00)	Mertens 13'; Manolas (yellow card) 19', (goal) 45+4'; Hysaj (yellow card) 78'	Report	Sabelli (yellow card) 33'; Balotelli 67'	Stadium: Stadio San Paolo; Attendance: 44,296; Referee: Gianluca Manganiello

6 October 2019 7	Torino	0–0	Napoli	Turin
18:00 CEST (UTC+02:00)	Lukić (yellow card) 35'	Report	Lozano (yellow card) 37'; Luperto (yellow card) 45+2'	Stadium: Stadio Olimpico Grande Torino; Attendance: 24,343; Referee: Daniele Doveri

19 October 2019 8	Napoli	2–0	Hellas Verona	Naples
18:00 CEST (UTC+02:00)	Koulibaly (yellow card) 4'; Milik 37', 67'; Zieliński (yellow card) 83'; Mertens (yellow card) 90+1'	Report	Lazović (yellow card) 15'; Günter (yellow card) 54'; Faraoni (yellow card) 66'	Stadium: Stadio San Paolo; Attendance: 38,686; Referee: Marco Piccinini

27 October 2019 9	SPAL	1–1	Napoli	Ferrara
15:00 CET (UTC+01:00)	Kurtić 16'; Espeto (yellow card) 25'; Tomović (yellow card) 45'; Cionek (yellow card) 90+2'; Berisha (yellow card) 90+6'	Report	Milik 9'; Luperto (yellow card) 85'	Stadium: Stadio Paolo Mazza; Attendance: 14,726; Referee: Federico La Penna

30 October 2019 10	Napoli	2–2	Atalanta	Naples
19:00 CET (UTC+01:00)	Maksimović 16', (yellow card) 48'; Milik 71'; Di Lorenzo (yellow card) 84'; Insigne (yellow card) 88'	Report	Toloi (yellow card) 20'; Freuler 41'; De Roon (yellow card) 64'; Pašalić (yellow card) 67'; Iličić 86'	Stadium: Stadio San Paolo; Attendance: 30,061; Referee: Piero Giacomelli

2 November 2019 11	Roma	2–1	Napoli	Rome
15:00 CET (UTC+01:00)	Zaniolo 19'; Veretout 55' (pen.); Kluivert (yellow card) 76'; Spinazzola (yellow card) 86'; Ünder (yellow card) 90+3'; Çetin (yellow card) 90+3' (yellow-red card) 90+5'	Report	Milik 72', (yellow card) 88'; Di Lorenzo (yellow card) 77'; Mário Rui (yellow card) 78'	Stadium: Stadio Olimpico; Attendance: 34,502; Referee: Gianluca Rocchi

9 November 2019 12	Napoli	0–0	Genoa	Naples
20:45 CET (UTC+01:00)	Llorente (yellow card) 81'	Report	Schöne (yellow card) 15'; Cassata (yellow card) 79'; Cleonise (yellow card) 83'; Lerager (yellow card) 85'	Stadium: Stadio San Paolo; Attendance: 22,947; Referee: Gianpaolo Calvarese

23 November 2019 13	Milan	1–1	Napoli	Milan
18:00 CET (UTC+01:00)	Paquetá (yellow card) 26'; Bonaventura 29'; Hernandez (yellow card) 73'; Conti (yellow card) 90'	Report	Lozano 24'; Elmas (yellow card) 69'; Younes (yellow card) 77'	Stadium: San Siro; Attendance: 61,658; Referee: Daniele Orsato

1 December 2019 14	Napoli	1–2	Bologna	Naples
18:00 CET (UTC+01:00)	Koulibaly (yellow card) 37'; Llorente 41'	Report	Medel (yellow card) 36'; Poli (yellow card) 56'; Olsen 58'; Denswil (yellow card) 61'; Sansone 80'; Destro (yellow card) 90+3'; Džemaili (yellow card) 90+5'	Stadium: Stadio San Paolo; Attendance: 27,083; Referee: Fabrizio Pasqua

7 December 2019 15	Udinese	1–1	Napoli	Udine
18:00 CET (UTC+01:00)	Lasagna 32'; De Paul (yellow card) 34'; Fofana (yellow card) 60'; Okaka (yellow card) 82'	Report	Mertens (yellow card) 35'; Callejón (yellow card) 36'; Zieliński 69'; Maksimović (yellow card) 79' (red card) 80'; Mário Rui (yellow card) 90+1'	Stadium: Dacia Arena; Attendance: 20,405; Referee: Maurizio Mariani

14 December 2019 16	Napoli	1–2	Parma	Naples
18:00 CET (UTC+01:00)	Milik 64', (yellow card) 81'; Mertens (yellow card) 79'	Report	Kulusevski 4'; Gervinho (yellow card) 9', (goal) 90+3'; Gagliolo (yellow card) 63'	Stadium: Stadio San Paolo; Attendance: 27,487; Referee: Marco Di Bello

22 December 2019 17	Sassuolo	1–2	Napoli	Reggio Emilia
20:45 CET (UTC+01:00)	Traorè 29', (yellow card) 37'; Locatelli (yellow card) 66'	Report	Mário Rui (yellow card) 33'; Allan 57'; Elmas (yellow card) 72'; Obiang 90+4' (o.g.)	Stadium: Mapei Stadium – Città del Tricolore; Attendance: 12,570; Referee: Daniele Chiffi

6 January 2020 18	Napoli	1–3	Internazionale	Naples
20:45 CET (UTC+01:00)	Milik 39'	Report	Lukaku 14', 33'; Candreva (yellow card) 29'; Barella (yellow card) 61'; Martínez 62'; Esposito (yellow card) 72'; Sensi (yellow card) 82'; Škriniar (yellow card) 84'	Stadium: Stadio San Paolo; Attendance: 31,191; Referee: Daniele Doveri

11 January 2020 19	Lazio	1–0	Napoli	Rome
18:00 CET (UTC+01:00)	Lazzari (yellow card) 27'; Lulić (yellow card) 41'; Immobile 82'	Report	Manolas (yellow card) 38'; Mário Rui (yellow card) 85'	Stadium: Stadio Olimpico; Attendance: 40,000; Referee: Daniele Orsato

18 January 2020 20	Napoli	0–2	Fiorentina	Naples
20:45 CET (UTC+01:00)	Hysaj (yellow card) 61'; Demme (yellow card) 66'	Report	Chiesa 26'; Vlahović 74'; Dalbert (yellow card) 84'	Stadium: Stadio San Paolo; Attendance: 22,219; Referee: Fabrizio Pasqua

26 January 2020 21	Napoli	2–1	Juventus	Naples
20:45 CET (UTC+01:00)	Demme (yellow card) 30'; Zieliński 63'; Hysaj (yellow card) 76'; Insigne 86'	Report	Bentancur (yellow card) 61'; Rabiot (yellow card) 70'; Bernardeschi (yellow card) 81'; De Ligt (yellow card) 85'; Ronaldo 90', (yellow card) 90+3'	Stadium: Stadio San Paolo; Attendance: 39,111; Referee: Maurizio Mariani

3 February 2020 22	Sampdoria	2–4	Napoli	Genoa
20:45 CET (UTC+01:00)	Quagliarella 26'; Jankto (yellow card) 43'; Ekdal (yellow card) 47'; Ramírez (yellow card) 58'; Gabbiadini 73' (pen.); Linetty (yellow card) 87'	Report	Milik 3'; Elmas 16', (yellow card) 43'; Demme 83', (yellow card) 90+3'; Politano (yellow card) 90+5'; Mertens 90+8'	Stadium: Stadio Luigi Ferraris; Attendance: 20,017; Referee: Federico La Penna

9 February 2020 23	Napoli	2–3	Lecce	Naples
15:00 CET (UTC+01:00)	Koulibaly (yellow card) 37'; Milik 48', (yellow card) 73'; Zieliński (yellow card) 57'; Mário Rui (yellow card) 80'; Demme (yellow card) 84'; Callejón 90'	Report	Lapadula 29', 61'; Rispoli (yellow card) 66'; Vigorito (yellow card) 78'; Mancosu 82'; Petriccione (yellow card) 85'	Stadium: Stadio San Paolo; Attendance: 40,825; Referee: Antonio Giua

16 February 2020 24	Cagliari	0–1	Napoli	Cagliari
18:00 CET (UTC+01:00)	João Pedro (yellow card) 12'; Walukiewicz (yellow card) 30'; Nández (yellow card) 74'	Report	Mertens 66'; Zieliński (yellow card) 81'	Stadium: Sardegna Arena; Attendance: 13,535; Referee: Daniele Doveri

21 February 2020 25	Brescia	1–2	Napoli	Brescia
20:45 CET (UTC+01:00)	Chancellor 26'; Matějů (yellow card) 49'; Martella (yellow card) 74'; Dessena (yellow card) 77'	Report	Insigne 50' (pen.); Fabián 54'; Mertens (yellow card) 67'; Elmas (yellow card) 74'; Milik (yellow card) 90'	Stadium: Stadio Mario Rigamonti; Attendance: 14,703; Referee: Daniele Orsato

29 February 2020 26	Napoli	2–1	Torino	Naples
20:45 CET (UTC+01:00)	Manolas 19'; Di Lorenzo 82'; Allan (yellow card) 90+3'	Report	Rincón (yellow card) 36'; Zaza (yellow card) 40'; Edera 90+1'; Ansaldi (yellow card) 90+2'	Stadium: Stadio San Paolo; Attendance: 23,586; Referee: Maurizio Mariani

23 June 2020 27	Hellas Verona	0–2	Napoli	Verona
19:30 CEST (UTC+02:00)	Faraoni (yellow card) 54'	Report	Milik 38'; Koulibaly (yellow card) 58'; Lozano 90'	Stadium: Stadio Marc'Antonio Bentegodi; Attendance: 0 Referee: Fabrizio Pasqua
Note: Match was postponed to 13 March, then to 23 June, from its original date of 8 March due to schedule shuffling to allow for previous postponements to be played due to concerns over the COVID-19 pandemic. All subsequent matches were also shuffled to allow for this accommodation. On 9 March, all sports events in Italy were suspended until 3 April. This was the first match played since the COVID-19 pandemic lockdown in Italy.

28 June 2020 28	Napoli	3–1	SPAL	Naples
19:30 CEST (UTC+02:00)	Mertens 4'; Callejón 36'; Younes 78'	Report	Petagna 29'; Valoti (yellow card) 73'; Farès (yellow card) 79'; Felipe (yellow card) 89'	Stadium: Stadio San Paolo; Attendance: 0 Referee: Luca Pairetto

2 July 2020 29	Atalanta	2–0	Napoli	Bergamo
19:30 CEST (UTC+02:00)	Pašalić 47'; Gosens 55'; Toloi (yellow card) 88'	Report	Mário Rui (yellow card) 67'	Stadium: Stadio Atleti Azzurri d'Italia; Attendance: 0 Referee: Daniele Doveri

5 July 2020 30	Napoli	2–1	Roma	Naples
21:45 CEST (UTC+02:00)	Demme (yellow card) 7'; Koulibaly (yellow card) 49'; Callejón 55'; Insigne 82'	Report	Pellegrini (yellow card) 10'; Mkhitaryan 60'; Mancini (yellow card) 65'; Veretout (yellow card) 75'; Cristante (yellow card) 80'	Stadium: Stadio San Paolo; Attendance: 0 Referee: Gianluca Rocchi

8 July 2020 31	Genoa	1–2	Napoli	Genoa
19:30 CEST (UTC+02:00)	Goldaniga 49', (yellow card) 72'	Report	Mertens 45+1'; Lozano 66'	Stadium: Stadio Luigi Ferraris; Attendance: 0 Referee: Maurizio Mariani

12 July 2020 32	Napoli	2–2	Milan	Naples
21:45 CEST (UTC+02:00)	Di Lorenzo (yellow card) 10', (goal) 34'; Mário Rui (yellow card) 30'; Mertens 60'	Report	Hernandez 20', (yellow card) 75'; Kessié 73' (pen.); Conti (yellow card) 77'; Saelemaekers (yellow card) 85' (yellow-red card) 88'	Stadium: Stadio San Paolo; Attendance: 0 Referee: Federico La Penna

15 July 2020 33	Bologna	1–1	Napoli	Bologna
19:30 CEST (UTC+02:00)	Tomiyasu (yellow card) 46'; Barrow 80'	Report	Manolas 7'; Di Lorenzo (yellow card) 90'	Stadium: Stadio Renato Dall'Ara; Attendance: 0 Referee: Marco Piccinini

19 July 2020 34	Napoli	2–1	Udinese	Naples
19:30 CEST (UTC+02:00)	Milik 31', (yellow card) 38'; Koulibaly (yellow card) 78'; Demme (yellow card) 90+3'; Politano 90+5'	Report	Becão (yellow card) 14'; De Paul 22'; Walace (yellow card) 89'	Stadium: Stadio San Paolo; Attendance: 0 Referee: Daniele Chiffi

22 July 2020 35	Parma	2–1	Napoli	Parma
19:30 CEST (UTC+02:00)	Caprari 45+3' (pen.); Grassi (yellow card) 53'; Kulusevski 87' (pen.); Brugman (yellow card) 90+2'; Iacoponi (yellow card) 90+3'	Report	Lozano (yellow card) 35'; Insigne 54' (pen.)	Stadium: Stadio Ennio Tardini; Attendance: 0 Referee: Antonio Giua

25 July 2020 36	Napoli	2–0	Sassuolo	Naples
21:45 CEST (UTC+02:00)	Hysaj 8'; Mertens (yellow card) 69'; Allan 90+3'	Report	Berardi (yellow card) 40'; Đuričić (yellow card) 68'; Marlon (yellow card) 74'	Stadium: Stadio San Paolo; Attendance: 0 Referee: Gianluca Aureliano

28 July 2020 37	Internazionale	2–0	Napoli	Milan
21:45 CEST (UTC+02:00)	D'Ambrosio 11'; Sánchez (yellow card) 22'; Brozović (yellow card) 45+4'; Barella (yellow card) 55'; Martínez 74'; Biraghi (yellow card) 77'	Report	Lozano (yellow card) 80'	Stadium: San Siro; Attendance: 0 Referee: Paolo Valeri

1 August 2020 38	Napoli	3–1	Lazio	Naples
20:45 CEST (UTC+02:00)	Fabián 9'; Koulibaly (yellow card) 15'; Insigne 54' (pen.); Mário Rui (yellow card) 69'; Politano 90+3'; Elmas (yellow card) 90+5'	Report	Immobile 22', (yellow card) 72'; Milinković-Savić (yellow card) 90+4'	Stadium: Stadio San Paolo; Attendance: 0 Referee: Gianpaolo Calvarese

=== Coppa Italia ===
14 January 2020 Round of 16	Napoli	2–0	Perugia	Naples
15:00 CET (UTC+01:00)	Insigne 26' (pen.), 38' (pen.); Fabián (yellow card) 62'	Report	Falzerano (yellow card) 31'; Iemmello (yellow card) 37'; Gyömbér (yellow card) 56'	Stadium: Stadio San Paolo; Referee: Luca Massimi

21 January 2020 Quarter-finals	Napoli	1–0	Lazio	Naples
20:45 CET (UTC+01:00)	Insigne 2'; Hysaj (yellow card) 8' (yellow-red card) 19'	Report	Acerbi (yellow card) 14'; Lucas (yellow card) 25', (red card) 25'	Stadium: Stadio San Paolo; Attendance: 24,377; Referee: Davide Massa

12 February 2020 Semi-finals; First leg	Internazionale	0–1	Napoli	Milan
20:45 CET (UTC+01:00)	Škriniar (yellow card) 3'	Report	Manolas (yellow card) 51'; Fabián 57'; Mário Rui (yellow card) 77'; Ospina (yellow card) 85'	Stadium: San Siro; Attendance: 59,601; Referee: Gianpaolo Calvarese

13 June 2020 Semi-finals; Second leg	Napoli	1–1 (2–1 agg.)	Internazionale	Naples
21:00 CEST (UTC+02:00)	Mertens 41'; Ospina (yellow card) 79'	Report	Eriksen 2'; Young (yellow card) 12'; De Vrij (yellow card) 38'	Stadium: Stadio San Paolo; Attendance: 0 Referee: Gianluca Rocchi
Note: Match was postponed to 13 June from its original date of 5 March due to concerns over the coronavirus pandemic.

17 June 2020 Final	Napoli	0–0 (4–2 p)	Juventus	Rome
21:00 CEST (UTC+02:00)	Mário Rui (yellow card) 77'	Report	Bonucci (yellow card) 51'; Dybala (yellow card) 83'	Stadium: Stadio Olimpico; Attendance: 0 Referee: Daniele Doveri
	Penalties
	Insigne (penalty scored); Politano (penalty scored); Maksimović (penalty scored); Milik (penalty scored)		(penalty missed) Dybala; (penalty missed) Danilo; (penalty scored) Bonucci; (penalty scored) Ramsey
Note: Match was first postponed to 20 May, and then to 17 June to be played behind closed doors from its original date of 13 May due to concerns over the COVID-19 pandemic.

=== UEFA Champions League ===
==== Group stage ====
Pos	Team	Pld	W	D	L	GF	GA	GD	Pts	Qualification	LIV	NAP	SAL	GNK
1	(England) Liverpool	6	4	1	1	13	8	+5	13	Advance to knockout phase	—	1–1	4–3	2–1
2	(Italy) Napoli	6	3	3	0	11	4	+7	12	Advance to knockout phase	2–0	—	1–1	4–0
3	(Austria) Red Bull Salzburg	6	2	1	3	16	13	+3	7	Transfer to Europa League	0–2	2–3	—	6–2
4	(Belgium) Genk	6	0	1	5	5	20	−15	1		1–4	0–0	1–4	—

Source: UEFA
Rules for classification: Group stage tiebreakers

17 September 2019 1	Napoli (Italy)	2–0	(England) Liverpool	Naples, Italy
21:00 CEST (UTC+02:00)	Mertens 82' (pen.); Llorente (yellow card) 90', (goal) 90+2'	Report	Robertson (yellow card) 57'; Milner (yellow card) 61'	Stadium: Stadio San Paolo; Attendance: 38,878; Referee: Felix Brych (Germany)

2 October 2019 2	Genk (Belgium)	0–0	(Italy) Napoli	Genk, Belgium
18:55 CEST (UTC+02:00)	Ito (yellow card) 50'	Report	Milik (yellow card) 65'; Fabián (yellow card) 78'	Stadium: Luminus Arena; Attendance: 19,962; Referee: István Kovács (Romania)

23 October 2019 3	Red Bull Salzburg (Austria)	2–3	(Italy) Napoli	Wals-Siezenheim, Austria
21:00 CEST (UTC+02:00)	Haaland 40' (pen.), 72', (yellow card) 45+2'	Report	Mertens 17', 64'; Lozano (yellow card) 38'; Malcuit (yellow card) 39'; Insigne 73'; Llorente (yellow card) 90'	Stadium: Stadion Wals-Siezenheim; Attendance: 29,520; Referee: Clément Turpin (France)

5 November 2019 4	Napoli (Italy)	1–1	(Austria) Red Bull Salzburg	Naples, Italy
21:00 CET (UTC+01:00)	Zieliński (yellow card) 27'; Lozano 44'	Report	Onguéné (yellow card) 4'; Haaland 11' (pen.); Pongračić (yellow card) 37'	Stadium: Stadio San Paolo; Attendance: 32,862; Referee: Szymon Marciniak (Poland)

27 November 2019 5	Liverpool (England)	1–1	(Italy) Napoli	Liverpool, England
21:00 CET (UTC+01:00)	Lovren 65'; Robertson (yellow card) 90+2'	Report	Mertens 21'; Koulibaly (yellow card) 90+2'; Allan (yellow card) 90+4'	Stadium: Anfield; Attendance: 52,128; Referee: Carlos del Cerro Grande (Spain)

10 December 2019 6	Napoli (Italy)	4–0	(Belgium) Genk	Naples, Italy
18:55 CET (UTC+01:00)	Milik 3', 26', 38' (pen.); Mertens 74' (pen.); Mário Rui (yellow card) 80'; Koulibaly (yellow card) 87'	Report	Vandevoordt (yellow card) 37'; De Norre (yellow card) 74'; Paintsil (yellow card) 89'	Stadium: Stadio San Paolo; Attendance: 22,265; Referee: Cüneyt Çakır (Turkey)

==== Knockout phase ====
===== Round of 16 =====
25 February 2020 First leg	Napoli (Italy)	1–1	(Spain) Barcelona	Naples, Italy
21:00 CET (UTC+01:00)	Mertens 30'; Insigne (yellow card) 61'; Mário Rui (yellow card) 89'	Report	Busquets (yellow card) 49'; Griezmann 57', (yellow card) 83'; Messi (yellow card) 66'; Vidal (yellow card) 89' (yellow-red card) 89'	Stadium: Stadio San Paolo; Attendance: 44,388; Referee: Felix Brych (Germany)

8 August 2020 Second leg	Barcelona (Spain)	3–1 (4–2 agg.)	(Italy) Napoli	Barcelona, Spain
21:00 CEST (UTC+02:00)	Lenglet 10'; Messi 23'; Suárez 45+1' (pen.), (yellow card) 90+2'	Report	Insigne 45+5' (pen.); Zieliński (yellow card) 60'	Stadium: Camp Nou; Attendance: 0 Referee: Cüneyt Çakır (Turkey)
Note: Match was meant to be played behind closed doors due to concerns over the coronavirus pandemic. However, on 13 March, the match was indefinitely postponed due to a pandemic of COVID-19 in Spain. The match was rescheduled on 17 June to 8 August, and was played behind closed doors due to concerns over the COVID-19 pandemic in Europe.

== Statistics ==
=== Appearances and goals ===
No.	Pos	Nat	Player	Total		Serie A		Coppa Italia		Champions League	
No.	Pos	Nat	Player	Apps	Goals	Apps	Goals	Apps	Goals	Apps	Goals
Goalkeepers
1	GK	(Italy) ITA	Alex Meret	29	0	21+1	0	1	0	6	0
25	GK	(Colombia) COL	David Ospina	23	0	17	0	4	0	2	0
27	GK	(Greece) GRE	Orestis Karnezis	0	0	0	0	0	0	0	0
Defenders
2	DF	(France) FRA	Kévin Malcuit	6	0	3+1	0	0	0	1+1	0
6	DF	(Portugal) POR	Mário Rui	35	0	22+2	0	4	0	7	0
13	DF	(Italy) ITA	Sebastiano Luperto	12	0	5+4	0	0+1	0	1+1	0
19	DF	(Serbia) SRB	Nikola Maksimović	28	1	20+2	1	3	0	3	0
22	DF	(Italy) ITA	Giovanni Di Lorenzo	46	3	33	3	5	0	8	0
23	DF	(Albania) ALB	Elseid Hysaj	24	1	17+3	1	3+1	0	0	0
26	DF	(Senegal) SEN	Kalidou Koulibaly	34	0	24+1	0	2	0	7	0
31	DF	(Algeria) ALG	Faouzi Ghoulam	9	0	3+6	0	0	0	0	0
44	DF	(Greece) GRE	Kostas Manolas	35	4	25+1	4	3	0	6	0
Midfielders
4	MF	(Germany) GER	Diego Demme	22	1	10+5	1	4+1	0	2	0
5	MF	(Brazil) BRA	Allan	33	2	16+7	2	0+4	0	5+1	0
8	MF	(Spain) ESP	Fabián Ruiz	46	4	30+3	3	3+2	1	8	0
12	MF	(North Macedonia) MKD	Eljif Elmas	36	1	12+14	1	3+2	0	1+4	0
20	MF	(Poland) POL	Piotr Zieliński	49	2	32+5	2	5	0	6+1	0
34	MF	(Germany) GER	Amin Younes	11	1	1+8	1	0+1	0	0+1	0
68	MF	(Slovakia) SVK	Stanislav Lobotka	16	0	9+5	0	1	0	0+1	0
Forwards
7	FW	(Spain) ESP	José Callejón	45	4	25+8	4	3+2	0	7	0
9	FW	(Spain) ESP	Fernando Llorente	24	4	3+14	3	1	0	0+6	1
11	FW	(Mexico) MEX	Hirving Lozano	34	5	10+16	4	1	0	5+2	1
14	FW	(Belgium) BEL	Dries Mertens	42	16	18+13	9	3	1	7+1	6
21	FW	(Italy) ITA	Matteo Politano	20	2	9+6	2	1+2	0	0+2	0
24	FW	(Italy) ITA	Lorenzo Insigne	46	13	34+3	8	4	3	4+1	2
99	FW	(Poland) POL	Arkadiusz Milik	35	14	19+7	11	1+3	0	2+3	3
Players transferred out during the season
70	MF	(Italy) ITA	Gianluca Gaetano	1	0	0	0	0	0	0+1	0

Last updated: 8 August 2020
Source: Competitions

=== Goalscorers ===
Rank	No.	Pos	Nat	Name	Serie A	Coppa Italia	UEFA CL	Total
1	14	FW	(Belgium)	Dries Mertens	9	1	6	16
2	99	FW	(Poland)	Arkadiusz Milik	11	0	3	14
3	24	FW	(Italy)	Lorenzo Insigne	8	3	2	13
4	11	FW	(Mexico)	Hirving Lozano	4	0	1	5
5	7	FW	(Spain)	José Callejón	4	0	0	4
5	8	MF	(Spain)	Fabián Ruiz	3	1	0	4
5	9	FW	(Spain)	Fernando Llorente	3	0	1	4
5	44	DF	(Greece)	Kostas Manolas	4	0	0	4
9	22	DF	(Italy)	Giovanni Di Lorenzo	3	0	0	3
10	5	MF	(Brazil)	Allan	2	0	0	2
10	20	MF	(Poland)	Piotr Zieliński	2	0	0	2
10	21	FW	(Italy)	Matteo Politano	2	0	0	2
13	4	MF	(Germany)	Diego Demme	1	0	0	1
13	12	MF	(North Macedonia)	Eljif Elmas	1	0	0	1
13	19	DF	(Serbia)	Nikola Maksimović	1	0	0	1
13	23	DF	(Albania)	Elseid Hysaj	1	0	0	1
13	34	MF	(Germany)	Amin Younes	1	0	0	1
Own goals					1	0	0	1
Totals					61	5	13	79

=== Clean sheets ===
Rank	No.	Pos	Nat	Name	Serie A	Coppa Italia	UEFA CL	Total
1	1	GK	(Italy)	Alex Meret	3	1	3	7
2	25	GK	(Colombia)	David Ospina	4	3	0	7
Totals					7	4	3	14

Last updated: 23 June 2020

=== Disciplinary record ===
No.	Pos	Nat	Name	Serie A			Coppa Italia			UEFA CL			Total		
No.	Pos	Nat	Name	Booked	(yellow card) (yellow-red card)	Sent off (straight red)	Booked	(yellow card) (yellow-red card)	Sent off (straight red)	Booked	(yellow card) (yellow-red card)	Sent off (straight red)	Booked	(yellow card) (yellow-red card)	Sent off (straight red)
25	GK	(Colombia)	David Ospina	0	0	0	1	0	0	0	0	0	1	0	0
2	DF	(France)	Kévin Malcuit	0	0	0	0	0	0	1	0	0	1	0	0
6	DF	(Portugal)	Mário Rui	6	0	0	1	0	0	0	0	0	7	0	0
13	DF	(Italy)	Sebastiano Luperto	2	0	0	0	0	0	0	0	0	2	0	0
19	DF	(Serbia)	Nikola Maksimović	3	0	1	0	0	0	0	0	0	3	0	1
22	DF	(Italy)	Giovanni Di Lorenzo	3	0	0	0	0	0	0	0	0	3	0	0
23	DF	(Albania)	Elseid Hysaj	3	0	0	0	1	0	0	0	0	3	1	0
26	DF	(Senegal)	Kalidou Koulibaly	3	0	1	0	0	0	0	0	0	3	0	1
31	DF	(Algeria)	Faouzi Ghoulam	2	0	0	0	0	0	0	0	0	2	0	0
44	DF	(Greece)	Kostas Manolas	2	0	0	1	0	0	0	0	0	3	0	0
4	MF	(Germany)	Diego Demme	4	0	0	0	0	0	0	0	0	4	0	0
5	MF	(Brazil)	Allan	2	0	0	0	0	0	0	0	0	2	0	0
8	MF	(Spain)	Fabián Ruiz	2	0	0	1	0	0	1	0	0	4	0	0
12	MF	(North Macedonia)	Eljif Elmas	5	0	0	0	0	0	0	0	0	5	0	0
20	MF	(Poland)	Piotr Zieliński	3	0	0	0	0	0	1	0	0	4	0	0
34	MF	(Germany)	Amin Younes	1	0	0	0	0	0	0	0	0	1	0	0
7	FW	(Spain)	José Callejón	2	0	0	0	0	0	0	0	0	2	0	0
9	FW	(Spain)	Fernando Llorente	1	0	0	0	0	0	2	0	0	3	0	0
11	FW	(Mexico)	Hirving Lozano	1	0	0	0	0	0	1	0	0	2	0	0
14	FW	(Belgium)	Dries Mertens	3	0	0	0	0	0	0	0	0	3	0	0
21	FW	(Italy)	Matteo Politano	1	0	0	0	0	0	0	0	0	1	0	0
24	FW	(Italy)	Lorenzo Insigne	1	0	0	0	0	0	0	0	0	1	0	0
99	FW	(Poland)	Arkadiusz Milik	3	0	0	0	0	0	1	0	0	4	0	0
Totals				53	0	2	4	1	0	7	0	0	64	1	2

Last updated: 12 February 2020
