= 2019 International Champions Cup =

Tournament details
- Host countries: China; England; Sweden; Singapore; United States; Wales
- Dates: July 16 – August 10
- Teams: 12 (from 2 confederations)
- Venues: 17 (in 17 host cities)

Final positions
- Champions: (Portugal) Benfica (1st title)

Tournament statistics
- Matches played: 18
- Goals scored: 55 (3.06 per match)
- Attendance: 655,252 (36,403 per match)
- Top scorer: (Spain) Diego Costa (4 goals)

The 2019 International Champions Cup was the seventh edition of the International Champions Cup (ICC), a series of association football friendly matches. The competition was won by Portuguese club Benfica.

== Teams ==
A total of 12 teams participated in the competition. On June 12, Fiorentina replaced Roma due to Roma's impending participation in UEFA Europa League qualifiers (which they did not end up playing in).

| Nation | Team |
|---|---|
| England | Arsenal |
| England | Manchester United |
| England | Tottenham Hotspur |
| Germany | Bayern Munich |
| Italy | Fiorentina |
| Italy | Inter Milan |
| Italy | Juventus |
| Italy | Milan |
| Mexico | Guadalajara |
| Portugal | Benfica |
| Spain | Atlético Madrid |
| Spain | Real Madrid |

== Venues ==
17 venues for the International Champions Cup were announced on March 26, 2019.

United States

| East Rutherford (New York City Area) | Landover (Washington, D.C. Area) | Charlotte | Houston |
|---|---|---|---|
| MetLife Stadium | FedExField | Bank of America Stadium | NRG Stadium |
| Capacity: 82,500 | Capacity: 82,000 | Capacity: 75,525 | Capacity: 71,795 |
| Santa Clara (San Francisco Bay Area) | Location of the host cities of the 2019 International Champions Cup in the United States. | | Foxborough (Boston Area) |
| Levi's Stadium | Location of the host cities of the 2019 International Champions Cup in the United States. | | Gillette Stadium |
| Capacity: 68,500 | Location of the host cities of the 2019 International Champions Cup in the United States. | | Capacity: 65,878 |
| Arlington (Dallas-Fort Worth Area) | Location of the host cities of the 2019 International Champions Cup in the United States. | | Carson (Los Angeles Area) |
| Globe Life Park | Location of the host cities of the 2019 International Champions Cup in the United States. | | Dignity Health Sports Park |
| Capacity: 48,114 | Location of the host cities of the 2019 International Champions Cup in the United States. | | Capacity: 27,000 |
| Harrison (New York City Area) | Bridgeview (Chicago Area) | Kansas City | |
| Red Bull Arena | SeatGeek Stadium | Children's Mercy Park | |
| Capacity: 25,000 | Capacity: 20,000 | Capacity: 18,467 | |

Europe

| Cardiff | London | Solna (Stockholm Area) |
|---|---|---|
| Principality Stadium | Tottenham Hotspur Stadium | Friends Arena |
| Capacity: 73,931 | Capacity: 62,062 | Capacity: 54,329 |
Location of the host cities of the 2019 International Champions Cup in Europe.

Asia

| Singapore | Nanjing | Shanghai | Location of the host cities of the 2019 International Champions Cup in Asia. |
|---|---|---|---|
| Singapore National Stadium | Nanjing Olympic Sports Center | Hongkou Football Stadium | Location of the host cities of the 2019 International Champions Cup in Asia. |
| Capacity: 55,000 | Capacity: 61,443 | Capacity: 35,000 | Location of the host cities of the 2019 International Champions Cup in Asia. |

== Matches ==
The match schedule was announced on March 28, 2019, and was updated on June 12 after Fiorentina replaced Roma. Each team played three matches, for a total of 18 matches.

July 16, 2019
20:00 CDT

| Fiorentina (Italy) | 2–1 | (Mexico) Guadalajara |
|---|---|---|
| Simeone 27'; Sottil 52' | Report | López 25' |

SeatGeek Stadium, Bridgeview
Attendance: 10,062
Referee: Rubiel Vazquez (United States)

July 17, 2019
20:00 PDT
Audi Football Summit

| Arsenal (England) | 2–1 | (Germany) Bayern Munich |
|---|---|---|
| Poznański 49' (o.g.); Nketiah 88' | Report | Lewandowski 71' |

Dignity Health Sports Park, Carson
Attendance: 26,704
Referee: Kevin Stott (United States)

July 20, 2019
19:30 SGT

| Manchester United (England) | 1–0 | (Italy) Inter Milan |
|---|---|---|
| Greenwood 76' | Report |

Singapore National Stadium, Singapore
Attendance: 52,897
Referee: Letchman Gopala Krishnan (Singapore)

July 20, 2019
13:00 PDT

| Benfica (Portugal) | 3–0 | (Mexico) Guadalajara |
|---|---|---|
| De Tomás 4'; Silva 70'; Seferovic 73' | Report |

Levi's Stadium, Santa Clara
Attendance: 15,724
Referee: Joe Dickerson (United States)

July 20, 2019
18:00 EDT

| Arsenal (England) | 3–0 | (Italy) Fiorentina |
|---|---|---|
| Nketiah 15', 65'; Willock 89' | Report |

Bank of America Stadium, Charlotte
Attendance: 34,902
Referee: Marcos de Oliveira (United States)

July 20, 2019
19:00 CDT
Audi Football Summit

| Bayern Munich (Germany) | 3–1 | (Spain) Real Madrid |
|---|---|---|
| Tolisso 15'; Lewandowski 67'; Gnabry 69' | Report | Rodrygo 84' |

NRG Stadium, Houston
Attendance: 60,143
Referee: Ramy Touchan (United States)

July 21, 2019
19:30 SGT

| Juventus (Italy) | 2–3 | (England) Tottenham Hotspur |
|---|---|---|
| Higuaín 56'; Ronaldo 60' | Report | Lamela 30'; Lucas 65'; Kane 90+3' |

Singapore National Stadium, Singapore
Attendance: 50,443
Referee: Ahmad A'Qashah (Singapore)

July 23, 2019
19:00 EDT

| Real Madrid (Spain) | 2–2 | (England) Arsenal |
|---|---|---|
| Bale 56'; Asensio 59' | Report | Lacazette 10' (pen.); Aubameyang 24' |
Penalties
| Bale (penalty missed); Isco (penalty scored); Varane (penalty scored); Vinícius (penalty scored) | 3–2 | (penalty scored) Nelson; (penalty missed) Xhaka; (penalty scored) Saka; (penalty missed) Monreal; (penalty missed) Burton |

FedExField, Landover
Attendance: 52,826
Referee: Timothy Ford (United States)

July 23, 2019
20:00 CDT

| Bayern Munich (Germany) | 1–0 | (Italy) Milan |
|---|---|---|
| Goretzka 45+3' | Report |

Children's Mercy Park, Kansas City
Attendance: 18,469
Referee: Allen Chapman (United States)

July 23, 2019
20:00 CDT

| Guadalajara (Mexico) | 0–0 | (Spain) Atlético Madrid |
|---|---|---|
| | Report |
Penalties
| Ponce (penalty scored); Briseño (penalty scored); González (penalty scored); Huerta (penalty scored); Beltrán (penalty missed); Cervantes (penalty missed) | 4–5 | (penalty scored) Correa; (penalty scored) Herrera; (penalty missed) Šaponjić; (penalty scored) Felipe; (penalty scored) Moya; (penalty scored) Sanabria |

Globe Life Park, Arlington
Attendance: 12,467
Referee: Baldomero Toledo (United States)

July 24, 2019
19:30 CST

| Juventus (Italy) | 1–1 | (Italy) Inter Milan |
|---|---|---|
| Ronaldo 68' | Report | De Ligt 10' (o.g.) |
Penalties
| Cancelo (penalty scored); Ronaldo (penalty scored); Can (penalty scored); Rabiot (penalty missed); Bernardeschi (penalty missed); Demiral (penalty scored) | 4–3 | (penalty missed) Ranocchia; (penalty scored) Pușcaș; (penalty missed) Longo; (penalty scored) João Mário; (penalty scored) Barella; (penalty missed) Valero |

Nanjing Olympic Sports Centre, Nanjing
Attendance: 48,646
Referee: Zhang Lei (China)

July 24, 2019
20:00 EDT

| Fiorentina (Italy) | 1–2 | (Portugal) Benfica |
|---|---|---|
| Vlahović 29' | Report | Seferovic 9'; Caio 90+3' |

Red Bull Arena, Harrison
Attendance: 12,141
Referee: Robert Sibiga (United States)

July 25, 2019
19:30 CST

| Tottenham Hotspur (England) | 1–2 | (England) Manchester United |
|---|---|---|
| Lucas 65' | Report | Martial 21'; Gomes 80' |

Hongkou Football Stadium, Shanghai
Referee: Ai Kun (China)

July 26, 2019
19:30 EDT

| Real Madrid (Spain) | 3–7 | (Spain) Atlético Madrid |
|---|---|---|
| Nacho 59'; Benzema 85' (pen.); Hernández 89' | Report | Costa 1', 28', 45' (pen.), 51'; Félix 8'; Correa 19'; Vitolo 70' |

MetLife Stadium, East Rutherford
Attendance: 57,714
Referee: Ted Unkel (United States)

July 28, 2019
15:00 EDT

| Milan (Italy) | 0–1 | (Portugal) Benfica |
|---|---|---|
| | Report | Taarabt 70' |

Gillette Stadium, Foxborough
Attendance: 27,565
Referee: Sorin Stoica (United States)

August 3, 2019
17:30 BST

| Manchester United (England) | 2–2 | (Italy) Milan |
|---|---|---|
| Rashford 14'; Lingard 72' | Report | Suso 26'; Lindelöf 60' (o.g.) |
Penalties
| Lingard (penalty scored); Young (penalty scored); Greenwood (penalty scored); Gomes (penalty scored); James (penalty scored) | 5–4 | (penalty scored) Çalhanoğlu; (penalty scored) Bonaventura; (penalty scored) Silva; (penalty scored) Krunić; (penalty missed) Maldini |

Principality Stadium, Cardiff
Attendance: 65,892
Referee: Iwan Griffith (Wales)

August 4, 2019
15:00 BST

| Tottenham Hotspur (England) | 1–1 | (Italy) Inter Milan |
|---|---|---|
| Lucas 3' | Report | Sensi 36' |
Penalties
| Eriksen (penalty missed); Son Heung-min (penalty scored); Nkoudou (penalty scored); Alderweireld (penalty scored); Skipp (penalty missed) | 3–4 | (penalty missed) Pușcaș; (penalty scored) Ranocchia; (penalty scored) Dimarco; (penalty scored) Politano; (penalty scored) João Mário |

Tottenham Hotspur Stadium, London
Attendance: 58,905
Referee: Andre Marriner (England)

August 10, 2019
18:00 CEST

| Atlético Madrid (Spain) | 2–1 | (Italy) Juventus |
|---|---|---|
| Lemar 24'; Félix 33' | Report | Khedira 29' |

Friends Arena, Solna
Attendance: 49,752
Referee: Andreas Ekberg (Sweden)

== Table ==
The 12 teams were ranked based on results from their three matches, with the best-ranked team being crowned champions. In addition to three points for a win and none for a loss, a penalty shoot-out win was worth two points, while a loss on penalties earned one point.

| Pos | Team | Pld | W | PW | PL | L | GF | GA | GD | Pts | Final result |
|---|---|---|---|---|---|---|---|---|---|---|---|
| 1 | (Portugal) Benfica (C) | 3 | 3 | 0 | 0 | 0 | 6 | 1 | +5 | 9 | 2019 International Champions Cup winners |
| 2 | (Spain) Atlético Madrid | 3 | 2 | 1 | 0 | 0 | 9 | 4 | +5 | 8 | |
| 3 | (England) Manchester United | 3 | 2 | 1 | 0 | 0 | 5 | 3 | +2 | 8 | |
| 4 | (England) Arsenal | 3 | 2 | 0 | 1 | 0 | 7 | 3 | +4 | 7 | |
| 5 | (Germany) Bayern Munich | 3 | 2 | 0 | 0 | 1 | 5 | 3 | +2 | 6 | |
| 6 | (England) Tottenham Hotspur | 3 | 1 | 0 | 1 | 1 | 5 | 5 | 0 | 4 | |
| 7 | (Italy) Inter Milan | 3 | 0 | 1 | 1 | 1 | 2 | 3 | −1 | 3 | |
| 8 | (Italy) Fiorentina | 3 | 1 | 0 | 0 | 2 | 3 | 6 | −3 | 3 | |
| 9 | (Italy) Juventus | 3 | 0 | 1 | 0 | 2 | 4 | 6 | −2 | 2 | |
| 10 | (Spain) Real Madrid | 3 | 0 | 1 | 0 | 2 | 6 | 12 | −6 | 2 | |
| 11 | (Italy) Milan | 3 | 0 | 0 | 1 | 2 | 2 | 4 | −2 | 1 | |
| 12 | (Mexico) Guadalajara | 3 | 0 | 0 | 1 | 2 | 1 | 5 | −4 | 1 | |

Source: ICC
Rules for classification: 1) Points; 2) Head-to-head points; 3) Goal differential; 4) Goals scored; 5) Result against common opponent; 6) Fewer red cards; 7) Fewer yellow cards; 8) Fewer fouls committed; 9) Coin flip.
(C) Champion

== Media coverage ==
All 18 matches were live streamed for the unsold markets and highlights were also available for all territories around the world via ICC's official websites. The rights may be including both the 2019 International Leagues Cup (La Liga-Serie A cup) matches depending on the broadcasters.

| Country/region | Broadcaster | Summary | Ref |
|---|---|---|---|
| Australia | SBS | All 18 matches live on web and app, 17 of 18 matches live on Viceland | |
| Australia | Kayo Sports | All 18 matches live | |
| Australia | beIN Sports | All 18 matches live, plus both ILC matches | |
| Azerbaijan | CBC | Select matches live on CBC Sport | |
| DACH | Sport1 | 10 of 18 matches (including all three Bayern matches) live | |
| DACH | OneFootball | All 18 matches live | |
| DACH | DAZN | All 18 matches live | |
| Canada | DAZN | All 18 matches live | |
| Japan | DAZN | All 18 matches live | |
| Balkans | Sport Klub | All 18 matches live, plus both ILC matches. | |
| Belgium | Eleven Sports | All 18 matches live | |
| Luxembourg | Eleven Sports | All 18 matches live | |
| Brazil | Grupo Record | All 18 matches live on Play Plus, 17 of 18 matches live on Record News | |
| Brazil | Fox Sports | All 18 matches live | |
| Brunei | Astro | All 18 matches live on SuperSport (in English) (plus both ILC matches), Arena (in Malay), Astro GO, and NJOI Now respectively | |
| Malaysia | Astro | All 18 matches live on SuperSport (in English) (plus both ILC matches), Arena (in Malay), Astro GO, and NJOI Now respectively | |
| Bulgaria | Max Sport | All 18 matches live, plus both ILC matches. | |
| Caribbean | Digicel | All 18 matches live on Sportsmax. | |
| Caribbean | DirecTV Sports | All 18 matches live, plus both ILC matches. Not available in Bolivia, Brazil, and Paraguay. | |
| South America | DirecTV Sports | All 18 matches live, plus both ILC matches. Not available in Bolivia, Brazil, and Paraguay. | |
| Puerto Rico | DirecTV Sports | All 18 matches live, plus both ILC matches. Not available in Bolivia, Brazil, and Paraguay. | |
| Puerto Rico | ESPN | All 18 matches live in English (Belize and USA only) and Spanish, plus both ILC matches. Matches is not available in ANZ (Australia and New Zealand). | |
| ANZ | ESPN | All 18 matches live in English (Belize and USA only) and Spanish, plus both ILC matches. Matches is not available in ANZ (Australia and New Zealand). | |
| Belize | ESPN | All 18 matches live in English (Belize and USA only) and Spanish, plus both ILC matches. Matches is not available in ANZ (Australia and New Zealand). | |
| Central America | ESPN | All 18 matches live in English (Belize and USA only) and Spanish, plus both ILC matches. Matches is not available in ANZ (Australia and New Zealand). | |
| Mexico | ESPN | All 18 matches live in English (Belize and USA only) and Spanish, plus both ILC matches. Matches is not available in ANZ (Australia and New Zealand). | |
| United States | ESPN | All 18 matches live in English (Belize and USA only) and Spanish, plus both ILC matches. Matches is not available in ANZ (Australia and New Zealand). | |
| Catalonia | TV3 | Both ILC matches only. | |
| China | CCTV | Select matches live | |
| China | PPTV | All 18 matches live, plus both ILC matches. | |
| Cyprus | CytaVision | All 18 matches live | |
| Denmark | TV2 | Select matches live on TV2 Sport. | |
| Eurasia | Setanta Sports | All 18 matches live | |
| Georgia | Adjara | All 18 matches live, plus both ILC matches | |
| Greece | Nova Sports | All 18 matches live | |
| Hong Kong | TVB | All 18 matches live on MyTV Super, with 9 matches (including all 7 matches outside USA) on TVB Finance & Information Channel | |
| Iceland | 365 | All 18 matches live on Stöð 2 Sport | |
| Indian Subcontinent | Dream11 | All 18 matches live on Fancode | |
| Indonesia | TVRI | All 18 matches (16 live in-simulcast, one live, and one delayed respectively) on both National and Sport channels. | |
| Indonesia | Mola TV | All 18 matches live | |
| Timor Leste | Mola TV | All 18 matches live | |
| Iran | IRIB | Select matches live on Varzesh | |
| Iran | Varzesh TV Farsi | Select matches live | |
| Ireland | Eir Sport | 15 of 18 matches live, plus both ILC matches. | |
| Ireland | MUTV | Three MU matches only. | |
| United Kingdom | MUTV | Three MU matches only. | |
| United Kingdom | Premier Sports | 15 of 18 matches live, plus both ILC matches | |
| Israel | Charlton | All 18 matches live on Sport 1 and Sport 2 | |
| Italy | Sportitalia | All 18 matches live | |
| Italy | Sky Sport | Both ILC matches only | |
| Korea | SPOTV | All 18 matches live | |
| Maldives | MediaNet | All 18 matches live | |
| Malta | GO | All 18 matches live on TSN | |
| MENA | Sharjah Sports | Both ILC matches only | |
| Myanmar | Canal+ | All 18 matches live | |
| New Zealand | Spark | All 18 matches live | |
| Poland | Polsat | All 18 matches live on Sport, Extra (plus both ILC matches), and News channels respectively | |
| Portugal | Sport TV | All 18 matches live | |
| Russia | Match TV | All 18 matches live | |
| Scandinavia | Strive | All 18 matches live | |
| Singapore | Mediacorp | All 18 matches live on Toggle. Select matches same-day delayed (both matches in Singapore) on Channel 5. | |
| Spain | Mediapro | All 18 matches live on LaLiga TV, plus both ILC matches. Select matches also available on Gol. | |
| Spain | Movistar | Select plus both ILC matches live on #Vamos | |
| Spain | Real Madrid TV | Three RM matches only | |
| Sub-Saharan Africa | StarTimes | All 18 matches live on World Football, Sport Premium, and StarTimes On web and app. | |
| Tajikistan | Televizioni Tojikiston | All 18 matches live on Varzish and Futbol, respectively. | |
| Thailand | PPTV | Select matches live and delayed, plus highlights | |
| Turkey | TRT | All 18 matches live on web, 17 live and one delayed on Sport channel. | |
| Turkmenistan | Türkmenistan Sport | 1 last match live | |
| Vietnam | FPT Group | All 18 matches live | |

== See also ==
- 2019 Women's International Champions Cup
- 2019 La Liga-Serie A Cup
