= 2019–20 FC Barcelona season =

121st season in existence of FC Barcelona

Barcelona
2019–20 season
- President: Josep Maria Bartomeu
- Head Coach: Ernesto Valverde (until 13 January 2020); Quique Setién (from 13 January 2020)
- Stadium: Camp Nou
- La Liga: 2nd
- Copa del Rey: Quarter-finals
- Supercopa de España: Semi-finals
- UEFA Champions League: Quarter-finals
- Top goalscorer: League: Lionel Messi (25); All: Lionel Messi (31)
- Highest home attendance: 98,812 vs Arsenal (4 August 2019)
- Lowest home attendance: 43,216 vs Leganés (30 January 2020)
- Average home league attendance: 82,476 (including Joan Gamper)
- Biggest win: Barcelona 5–0 Eibar
- Biggest defeat: Barcelona 2–8 Bayern Munich
Home colours	Away colours	Third colours

The 2019–20 Barcelona season was the club's 121st season in existence and the 89th consecutive season in the top flight of Spanish football. Barcelona competed in La Liga, the Copa del Rey, the Supercopa de España and the UEFA Champions League. The season covered the period from 1 July 2019 to 14 August 2020.

The club endured its worst season in years, going trophyless for the first time since 2007–08. Head coach Ernesto Valverde was replaced by Quique Setién in January 2020 after a Supercopa defeat to Atlético Madrid, but that did not improve the team's fortunes, as they lost the closely fought title race to Real Madrid and were defeated 8–2 by Bayern Munich in a one-legged Champions League quarter-final tie.

== Season overview ==
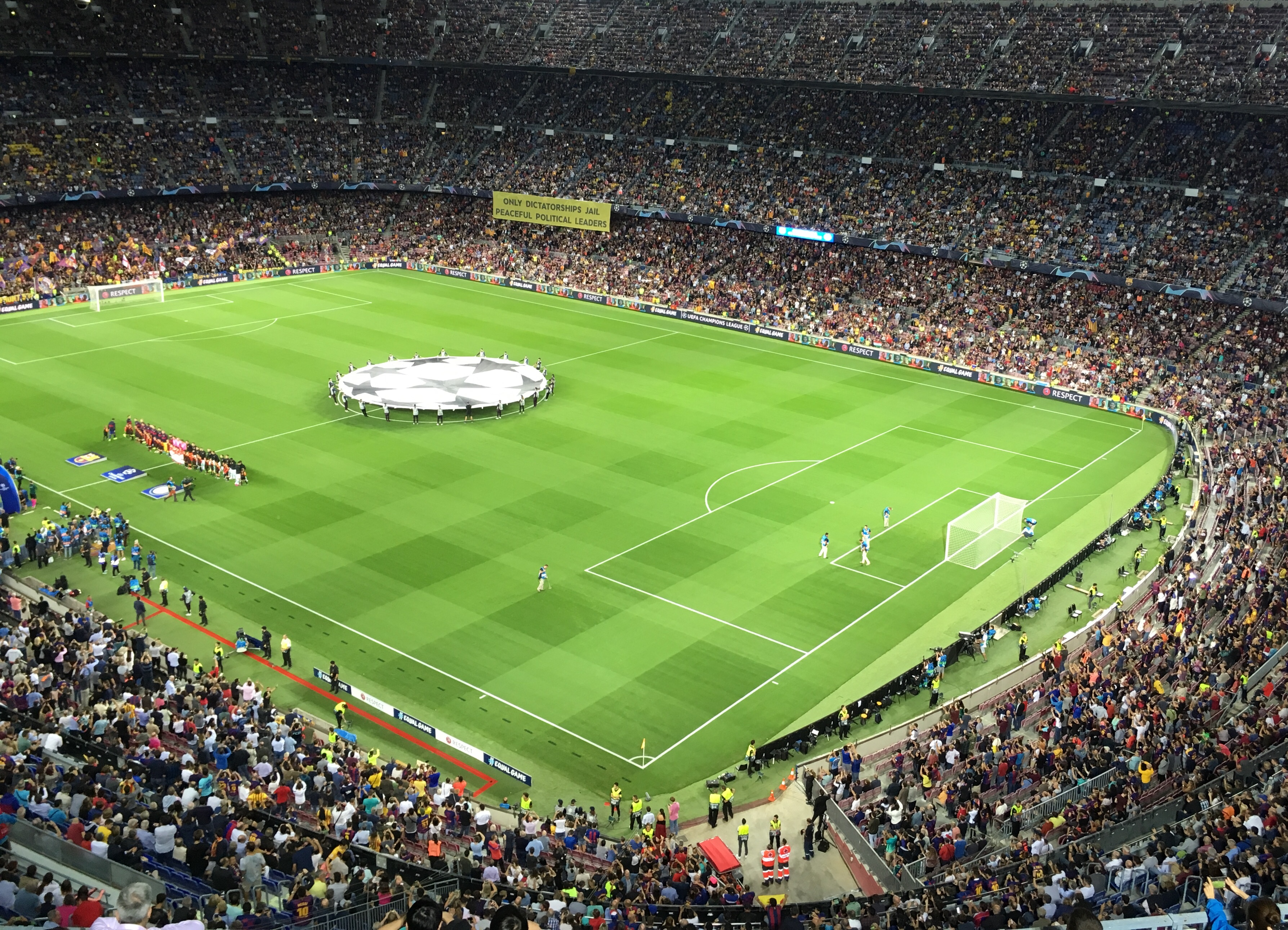
The opening ceremony for FC Barcelona vs. Inter game in Camp Nou, Barcelona.

=== June ===
On 26 June, Barcelona announced the departure of Jasper Cillessen to Valencia for a fee of €35 million. The following day on 27 June, Barcelona announced the signing of Neto from Valencia for a fee of €26 million plus €9 million in add-ons.

On 30 June, Denis Suárez was sold to Celta Vigo for €12.9 million plus €3.1 million in add-ons.

=== July ===
On 3 July, the Vice President of Sports Jordi Mestre resigned.

On 12 July, Barcelona signed Antoine Griezmann from Atlético Madrid after triggering his €120,000,000 buyout clause. Barcelona also sold Adrián Ortolá to CD Tenerife for an undisclosed price.

On 16 July, Barcelona activated Marc Cucurella's buy-back clause of €4 million, only two months after Eibar had permanently signed him for €2 million.

On 18 July, Barcelona and Getafe reached an agreement for the loan of Cucurella to the Madrid side for the rest of the season with an option to buy for €6 million.

=== August ===
On 2 August, Barça and Russian Premier League club Zenit St Petersburg agreed to the transfer of Malcom for a fee of €45,000,000 plus variables.

On 4 August, Barça and Real Betis reached an agreement for the signing of Junior Firpo for €18 million plus €12 million in variables.

On 16 August, Barça started their season in a 0–1 away defeat to Athletic Bilbao from a late winner from Aritz Aduriz.

On 18 August, Barça and Bayern Munich reached an agreement for the loan of Philippe Coutinho to the German side for the rest of the season with an option to buy for €120 million.

On 25 August, Barça defeated Real Betis in a 5–2 home rout, goals from Antoine Griezmann, Carles Pérez, Jordi Alba, and Arturo Vidal led the Blaugrana to victory.

On 31 August, Barça drew 2–2 away at Osasuna with goals from Ansu Fati and Arthur, with the forward becoming the youngest player in FC Barcelona's history to score a goal in La Liga (16 years and 304 days).

=== September ===
On 2 September, Rafinha extended his contract by one year until 2021 and moved to Celta Vigo on loan for the rest of the season.

On September 14, Barça defeated Valencia in a 5−2 win at home. Goals from Ansu Fati, Frenkie de Jong, Gerard Piqué, and a brace from Luis Suárez once again led the Blaugrana to victory.

On 17 September, Barça started their Champions League campaign with a 0−0 away draw with Borussia Dortmund.

On 21 September, Barça suffered a 2−0 away loss to Granada CF, conceding goals from Antonio Puertas and Álvaro Vadillo.

On 24 September, Barça defeated Villarreal CF 2−1 at home. First half goals from Antoine Griezmann and Arthur were enough for the home side to claim victory.

On 28 September, Barça defeated Getafe CF 2–0 away from home. Luis Suárez and Junior Firpo got themselves on the score sheet. Clemént Lenglet got sent off and received his first red card of the season.

=== October ===
On 2 October, Barça defeated Inter Milan 2–1 at home in the UEFA Champions League. Inter scored early through Lautaro Martínez but Barça came-back after Luis Suárez scored twice to earn the victory.

On 6 October, Barça defeated Sevilla FC 4–0 at home. Luis Suárez, Arturo Vidal, Ousmane Dembélé and Lionel Messi (both with their first goals of the season) lead the Blaugrana to victory. Both Dembélé and Ronald Araújo got sent off.

On 19 October, Barça defeated SD Eibar 3–0 away from home. Goals from Antoine Griezmann, Lionel Messi, and Luis Suárez helped the Blaugrana extend their winning run to five games.

On 23 October, Barça defeated Slavia Prague in the UEFA Champions League 2–1 away from home. Goals coming in from Lionel Messi and a Peter Olayinka own goal.

On 29 October, Barça defeated Real Valladolid 5–1 at home with goals from Clément Lenglet, Arturo Vidal, a brace from Messi and a goal from Suárez giving Barcelona seven straight wins.

=== November ===
On 2 November, Barcelona lost to Levante 3–1 away from home. A penalty converted by Messi gave the Blaugrana the lead in the first half but 3 goals in 7 minutes during the second half handed the home side the victory.

On 5 November, Barcelona drew 0–0 with Slavia Prague in the UEFA Champions League at home.

On 9 November, Barcelona defeated Celta Vigo 4–1 at home. Lionel Messi scored his first hat-trick of the season and Sergio Busquets scored one.

On 23 November, Barcelona narrowly defeated Leganés 2–1. Goals from Luis Suárez and Arturo Vidal cancelled out Youssef En-Nesyri's earlier goal.

On 27 November, Barcelona defeated Borussia Dortmund 3–1 in the UEFA Champions League, securing a spot in the round of 16 and finishing as group winners. Lionel Messi, Luis Suárez, and Antoine Griezmann were the goalscorers.

=== December ===
On 1 December, Barcelona defeated Atlético Madrid 1–0 away from home. Messi scored five minutes from time at the Wanda Metropolitano.

On 7 December, Barcelona defeated Real Mallorca 5–2 at home. Messi scored his second hat-trick of the season, while Griezmann and Suárez also appeared on the scoresheet.

On 10 December, a rotated Barcelona team defeated Inter Milan 2–1 away from home in the UEFA Champions League. Carles Pérez and Ansu Fati scored, the latter making history by becoming the youngest goalscorer in the history competition.

On 14 December, Barcelona drew 2–2 away at Real Sociedad. Antoine Griezmann scored against his old club, while Luis Suárez scored the second.

On 18 December, Barcelona drew 0–0 against rivals Real Madrid in El Clásico. It became the first time in over 17 years that both rivals ended goalless in the league, the last time being during the 2002–03 season.

On 21 December, Barcelona defeated Deportivo Alavés 4–1 at home in the last game of the year. Griezmann, Arturo Vidal, Messi, and Suárez all scored. The Uruguayan was involved in all 4 goals, contributing 1 goal and 3 assists.

On 28 December, Barcelona and Real Betis reached an agreement for the loan of Carles Aleñá for the remainder of the season.

=== January ===
On 4 January, Barcelona drew 2–2 with local rivals RCD Espanyol in the Barcelona derby. The Blaugrana conceded early when David López nodded in a free kick but Barça made a comeback with goals from Luis Suárez and Arturo Vidal. Espanyol drew late with a goal from Wu Lei.

On 9 January, Barcelona were knocked out of the Supercopa de España after being defeated 3–2 to Atlético Madrid.

On 13 January, Barcelona terminated Ernesto Valverde's contract after two and a half seasons in charge. The club appointed Quique Setién as the new head coach until 30 June 2022.

On 15 January, Barcelona reached an agreement with FC Schalke 04 for the loan on Jean-Clair Todibo for the remainder of the season. The German side paid a €1.5 million loan fee and obtained a buy option for €25 million.

On 19 January, Barcelona defeated Granada 1–0 at home. A second half goal from Messi saw Quique Setién win his first game in charge as a Barça coach.

On 22 January, Barcelona defeated UD Ibiza 2–1 away from home in the Copa del Rey. Ibiza scored first, but an Antoine Griezmann brace secured a comeback for the Blaugrana.

On 25 January, Barcelona lost 2–0 to Valencia away from home. A brace from Maxi Gómez sealed a victory for Los Che.

On 30 January, Barcelona defeated Leganés 5–0 at home in the Copa del Rey. Goals from Antoine Griezmann, Clément Lenglet, Arthur and a Leo Messi brace gave Barça a passage into the next round.

On 31 January, Barcelona reached an agreement with OGC Nice for the loan of Moussa Wagué for the remainder of the season. The French side obtained a buy option for €10 million.

=== February ===
On 2 February, Barcelona defeated Levante 2–1 at home in the league. A brace from Ansu Fati gave Barça the win.

On 6 February, Barcelona were eliminated from the Copa del Rey by Athletic Bilbao in the quarter-finals. A late Iñaki Williams header secured a passage for the home side into the semi-finals.

On 9 February, Barcelona defeated Real Betis 3–2 away from home. Goals from Sergio Canales and Nabil Fekir weren't enough for the home side as de Jong, Busquets and Lenglet scored for the away team. Messi assisted all three goals and Lenglet received a second yellow card, getting sent off.

On 15 February, Barcelona defeated Getafe 2–1 at home. Antoine Griezmann and Sergi Roberto scored, but Barça conceded a consolation from Ángel Rodríguez.

On 20 February, Barcelona signed Martin Braithwaite from Leganés for €18 million. Barcelona was given permission from La Liga to sign an emergency forward as Luis Suárez and Ousmane Dembélé were both ruled out with injuries for the rest of the season.

On 22 February, Barcelona defeated Eibar 5–0 at home. Messi scored a first half hat-trick and scored once again late on. Arthur also scored.

On 25 February, Barcelona drew 1–1 with S.S.C. Napoli in the first leg of their UEFA Champions League round of 16 tie. Antoine Griezmann cancelled out Dries Mertens' opener in Naples.

=== March ===
On 1 March, Barcelona lost 2–0 to bitter rivals Real Madrid away from home, making it the first time since 25 October 2014 that Barcelona lost at the Santiago Bernabéu in league play. It was Setién's first Clásico as a Barça coach since taking charge in January.

On 7 March, Barcelona defeated Real Sociedad 1–0 at home after Lionel Messi converted a late penalty.

On 12 March, the next two league matchdays were suspended to combat the spread of COVID-19.

On 13 March, the club suspended all first team activity until further notice.

On 23 March, La Liga was suspended indefinitely due to the COVID-19 pandemic.

=== June ===
On 13 June, after a three-month hiatus, Barcelona returned to action against Real Mallorca away from home. Barcelona won 4–0 behind closed doors. Arturo Vidal, Martin Braithwaite, Jordi Alba and Messi scored for the Blaugrana. Braithwaite also scored his first goal as a Barça player.

On 16 June, Barcelona defeated Leganés 2–0 at home. Ansu Fati and Messi scored.

On 19 June, Barcelona drew 0–0 away against Sevilla.

On 23 June, Barcelona defeated Athletic Bilbao 1–0 at home. Ivan Rakitić came off to bench to score his first goal of the season.

On 27 June, Barcelona drew 2–2 away against Celta Vigo. Luis Suárez scored twice for the visitors and Fyodor Smolov and Iago Aspas scored for the home side.

On 29 June, Barcelona and Juventus reached an agreement over the transfer of Arthur for a fee of €72 million plus €10 million in variables. The club also confirmed the signing of Miralem Pjanić from Juventus for a fee of €60 million plus €5 million in variables. Arthur and Pjanić will join their respective clubs once the season concludes.

On 30 June, Getafe triggered Marc Cucurella's option to buy for €10 million. On the same day Barça faced Atlético Madrid at home. The Catalans took the lead through a Diego Costa own goal but Atlético equalized with a controversial penalty, converted by Saúl. Barcelona took the lead through another controversial penalty decision and Messi converted his 700th career goal, but Atlético equalized once again with another questionable penalty decision, with Saúl scoring again from the spot.

=== July ===
On 5 July, Barcelona defeated Villarreal 4–1 away from home. Goals from Suárez, Griezmann, Fati, and a Pau Torres own goal gave Barça the win.

On 8 July, Barcelona defeated local rivals Espanyol 1–0 at home, relegating them to the Segunda División in the process. Suárez scored his 195th goal, overtaking László Kubala as the club's third top all-time goalscorer.

On 11 July, Barcelona defeated Real Valladolid 1–0 away from home. Arturo Vidal scored the only goal.

On 16 July, Barcelona lost to Osasuna 2–1 at home. Former Barça player José Arnaiz and Roberto Torres scored for the visitors, while Messi scored the only goal for the home side. In the same day, rivals Real Madrid claimed the La Liga title in a 2–1 victory against Villarreal.

On 19 July, Barcelona ended the league season by defeating Alavés 5–0 away from home. Messi scored a brace, Fati, Suárez and Nélson Semedo – with his first of the season – also scored.

=== August ===
On 8 August, Barcelona defeated Napoli 3–1 at home in the second leg of their UEFA Champions League round of 16 tie. Lenglet, Messi, and Suárez scored.

On 14 August, Barcelona's season ended after losing 8–2 to Bayern Munich in the UEFA Champions League single-leg quarter-final. Thomas Müller and Barça loanee Philippe Coutinho scored twice, while Ivan Perišić, Serge Gnabry, Joshua Kimmich, and Robert Lewandowski all scored one goal each. David Alaba scored an own goal for the Blaugrana and Suárez scored. The loss was the biggest defeat in history in a UEFA Champions League knockout match.

== Kit ==
Home	Away	Third	Fourth	Goalkeeper 1	Goalkeeper 2	Goalkeeper 3	Goalkeeper 4

== Squad information ==
=== First Team ===
N	Pos.	Nat.	Name	Age	EU	Since	App	Goals	Ends	Transfer fee	Notes
1	GK	(Germany)	Marc-André ter Stegen	28	EU	2014	233	0	2022	€12M	
2	DF	(Portugal)	Nélson Semedo	26	EU	2017	120	1	2022	€30M	
3	DF	(Spain)	Gerard Piqué (3rd captain)	33	EU	2008	540	47	2022	€5M	Originally from Youth system
4	MF	(Croatia)	Ivan Rakitić	32	EU	2014	308	36	2021	€18M	
5	MF	(Spain)	Sergio Busquets (vice-captain)	32	EU	2008	576	15	2023	Youth system	
8	MF	(Brazil)	Arthur	24	Non-EU	2018	72	4	2024	€31M	
9	FW	(Uruguay)	Luis Suárez	33	EU	2014	279	195	2021	€81M	Second nationality: Italy
10	FW	(Argentina)	Lionel Messi (captain)	33	EU	2004	727	630	2021	Youth system	Second nationality: Spain
11	FW	(France)	Ousmane Dembélé	23	EU	2017	74	19	2022	€105M	
13	GK	(Brazil)	Neto	31	EU	2019	4	0	2023	€26M	Second nationality: Italy
15	DF	(France)	Clément Lenglet	25	EU	2018	81	5	2023	€35.9M	
17	FW	(France)	Antoine Griezmann	29	EU	2019	46	15	2024	€120M	
18	DF	(Spain)	Jordi Alba	31	EU	2012	332	17	2024	€14M	Originally from Youth system
19	FW	(Denmark)	Martin Braithwaite	29	EU	2020	9	1	2024	€18M	
20	MF	(Spain)	Sergi Roberto (4th captain)	28	EU	2010	280	9	2022	Youth system	
21	MF	(Netherlands)	Frenkie de Jong	23	EU	2019	38	2	2024	€75M	
22	MF	(Chile)	Arturo Vidal	33	Non-EU	2018	93	11	2021	€18M	
23	DF	(France)	Samuel Umtiti	26	EU	2016	116	2	2023	€25M	
24	DF	(Spain)	Junior Firpo	23	EU	2019	21	1	2024	€18M	

- Last updated: 17 June 2020
- Source: FCBarcelona.com, LaLiga.es, Players in / out, Wikipedia players' articles, ESPN (for appearances and goals) and footballdatabase.com (for EU passport)

=== From Barcelona B and Youth Academy ===
N	Pos.	Nat.	Name	Age	EU	Since	App	Goals	Ends	Transfer fee	Notes
26	GK	(Spain)	Iñaki Peña	21	EU	2018	0	0	2021	Youth system	
28	MF	(Spain)	Riqui Puig	21	EU	2018	15	0	2021	Youth system	
30	MF	(Spain)	Álex Collado	21	EU	2019	2	0	2021	Youth system	
31	FW	(Spain)	Ansu Fati	17	EU	2019	33	8	2022	Youth system	
32	DF	(Spain)	Guillem Jaime	21	EU	2018	0	0	2020	Youth system	
33	DF	(Uruguay)	Ronald Araújo	21	Non-EU	2019	6	0	2023	€1.7M	
34	MF	(Spain)	Ferrán Sarsanedas	23	EU	2019	0	0	2021	Youth system	
35	DF	(Spain)	Dani Morer	22	EU	2019	0	0	2021	Youth system	
36	GK	(Spain)	Arnau Tenas	19	EU	2019	0	0	2023	Youth system	
37	FW	(Japan)	Hiroki Abe	21	Non-EU	2019	0	0	2023	€1.1M	
38	FW	(Ecuador)	Kike Saverio	21	EU	2020	0	0	2020	Youth system	Second nationality: Spain
39	DF	(Spain)	Sergio Akieme	22	EU	2020	0	0	2021	€?M	
40	DF	(Spain)	Chumi	21	EU	2018	3	0	2020	Youth system	
41	FW	(Albania)	Rey Manaj	23	EU	2020	0	0	2023	€0.7M	Second nationality: Italy
42	MF	(Spain)	Monchu	20	EU	2020	1	0	2021	Youth system	
43	DF	(Spain)	Jorge Cuenca	20	EU	2018	1	0	2021	Youth system	
44	DF	(Spain)	Óscar Mingueza	21	EU	2020	0	0	2021	Youth system	
45	FW	(United States)	Konrad de la Fuente	19	EU	2020	0	0	2022	Youth system	Second nationality: Spain
46	MF	(Netherlands)	Ludovit Reis	21	EU	2020	0	0	2022	€3.25M	
47	MF	(Spain)	Jandro Orellana	20	EU	2020	0	0	2021	Youth system	

- Last updated: 8 August 2020
- Source: FCBarcelona.com and UEFA.com

== Transfers ==
=== Players in ===
Entry date	Position	No.	Player	From club	Fee	Ref.
1 July 2019 (Note: Deal agreed 23 January 2019.)	MF	21	(Netherlands) Frenkie de Jong	(Netherlands) Ajax	€75,000,000 (Note: Fee may eventually rise to €86,000,000.)	
1 July 2019 (Note: Deal agreed 31 January 2019.)	DF	–	(Brazil) Emerson Royal	(Brazil) Atlético Mineiro	€12,000,000	
1 July 2019 (Note: Deal agreed 27 June 2019.)	GK	13	(Brazil) Neto	(Spain) Valencia	€26,000,000 (Note: Fee may eventually rise to €35,000,000.)	
12 July 2019	FW	17	(France) Antoine Griezmann	(Spain) Atletico Madrid	€120,000,000	
16 July 2019	DF	–	(Spain) Marc Cucurella	(Spain) Eibar	€4,000,000	
4 August 2019	DF	24	(Spain) Junior Firpo	(Spain) Real Betis	€18,000,000 (Note: Fee may eventually rise to €30,000,000.)	
20 February 2020	FW	19	(Denmark) Martin Braithwaite	(Spain) Leganés	€18,000,000	
Total					€273,000,000	

=== Players out ===
Exit date	Position	No.	Player	To club	Fee	Ref.
1 July 2019 (Note: Deal agreed 31 January 2019.)	DF	—	(Brazil) Emerson Royal	(Spain) Real Betis	€6,000,000 (Note: Option to buy back for €6,000,000 or sell for additional €6,000,000 in 2021.)	
25 June 2019	FW	—	(Spain) Marc Cardona	(Spain) Osasuna	€2,500,000	
25 June 2019	MF	—	(Portugal) André Gomes	(England) Everton	€25,000,000 (Note: Fee may eventually rise to €29,000,000.)	
27 May 2019	DF	—	(Spain) Marc Cucurella	(Spain) Eibar	€2,000,000	
30 June 2019	MF	—	(Spain) Denis Suárez	(Spain) Celta Vigo	€12,900,000 (Note: Fee may eventually rise to €16,000,000.)	
1 July 2019	DF	24	(Belgium) Thomas Vermaelen	(Japan) Vissel Kobe	Free transfer (Note: Joined on July 27.)	
1 July 2019	DF	—	(Brazil) Douglas	(Turkey) Beşiktaş	Free transfer (Note: Joined on July 27.)	
26 June 2019	GK	13	(Netherlands) Jasper Cillessen	(Spain) Valencia	€35,000,000	
1 July 2019	DF	17	(Colombia) Jeison Murillo	(Spain) Valencia	Loan Return	
1 July 2019	FW	19	(Ghana) Kevin-Prince Boateng	(Italy) Sassuolo	Loan Return	
5 July 2019	DF	—	(Spain) Sergi Palencia	(France) Saint-Étienne	€2,000,000 (Note: Fee may eventually rise to €3,000,000.)	
13 July 2019	GK	—	(Spain) Adrián Ortolá	(Spain) Tenerife	Undisclosed	
2 August 2019	FW	14	(Brazil) Malcom	(Russia) Zenit Saint Petersburg	€40,000,000 (Note: Fee may eventually rise to €45,000,000.)	
Total					€125,400,000	

=== Loans out ===
Start date	End date	Position	No.	Player	To club	Fee	Ref.
18 July 2019	End of season	DF	—	(Spain) Marc Cucurella	(Spain) Getafe	None (Note: Option to buy for €6,000,000. end of the season.)	
19 August 2019	End of season	MF	7	(Brazil) Philippe Coutinho	(Germany) Bayern Munich	€8,500,000 (Note: Option to buy for €120,000,000. end of the season.)	
2 September 2019	End of season	MF	12	(Brazil) Rafinha	(Spain) Celta Vigo	None (Note: Potential add-ons of up to €1.5m.)	
28 December 2019	End of season	MF	19	(Spain) Carles Aleñá	(Spain) Real Betis	None	
15 January 2020	End of season	DF	6	(France) Jean-Clair Todibo	(Germany) Schalke 04	€1,500,000 (Note: Option to buy for €25,000,000. end of the season.)	
30 January 2020	End of season	FW	27	(Spain) Carles Pérez	(Italy) Roma	None (Note: Potential add-ons of up to €3.5m.) (Note: Compulsory purchase for €11,000,000. end of the season.)	
31 January 2020	End of season	FW	29	(Spain) Abel Ruiz	(Portugal) Braga	None (Note: Compulsory purchase for €8,000,000. end of the season.)	
31 January 2020	End of season	DF	16	(Senegal) Moussa Wagué	(France) Nice	None (Note: Option to buy for €10,000,000. end of the season.)	

=== Transfer summary ===
Undisclosed fees are not included in the transfer totals.

Expenditure

Summer: ▼€255,000,000

Winter: ▼€18,000,000

Total: ▼€273,000,000

Income

Summer: ▲€133,900,000

Winter: ▲€1,500,000

Total: ▲€135,400,000

Net totals

Summer: ▼€121,100,000

Winter: ▼€16,500,000

Total: ▼€137,600,000

== Pre-season and friendlies ==
Win Draw Loss

23 July 2019 Rakuten Cup	Barcelona	1–2	Chelsea	Saitama, Japan
17:30 JST	Rakitić 90+1'	Report	Abraham 34'; Barkley 81'	Stadium: Saitama Stadium 2002; Attendance: 51,126; Referee: Masaaki Iemoto (Japan)

27 July 2019 Rakuten Cup	Vissel Kobe	0–2	Barcelona	Kobe, Japan
17:30 JST	Yamaguchi (yellow card) 37'	Report	Pérez 59', 86'	Stadium: Noevir Stadium Kobe; Attendance: 27,720; Referee: Yudai Yamamoto (Japan)

4 August 2019 Joan Gamper Trophy	Barcelona	2–1	Arsenal	Barcelona, Spain
20:00 CEST	Alba (yellow card) 23'; Wagué (yellow card) 67'; Maitland-Niles 69' (o.g.); Lenglet (yellow card) 74'; Suárez 90'	Report	Aubameyang 36'; Papastathopoulos (yellow card) 74'	Stadium: Camp Nou; Attendance: 98,812; Referee: Juan Martínez Munuera (Valencia)

7 August 2019 La Liga Serie A Cup	Barcelona	2–1	Napoli	Miami, United States
19:00 EDT	Busquets 38'; Wagué (yellow card) 47'; Junior (yellow card) 77'; Rakitić 79'	Report	Umtiti 42' (o.g.); Milik (yellow card) 70'; Hysaj (yellow card) 82'	Stadium: Hard Rock Stadium; Attendance: 57,062; Referee: Ted Unkel (United States)

10 August 2019 La Liga Serie A Cup	Napoli	0–4 (1–6 agg.)	Barcelona	Ann Arbor, United States
17:00 EDT	Mário Rui (yellow card) 73'	Report	Suárez 48', 58'; Semedo (yellow card) 53'; Griezmann 56'; Dembélé 63'	Stadium: Michigan Stadium; Attendance: 60,043; Referee: Rubiel Vazquez (United States)

13 November 2019 Friendly	Cartagena	0–2	Barcelona	Cartagena, Spain
19:00 CEST (UTC+02:00)		Report	Pérez 64'; Marqués 88'	Stadium: Cartagonova; Attendance: 13,000; Referee: Madrid Martínez (Region of Murcia)

== Competitions ==
=== Overview ===
Competition	First match	Last match	Starting round	Final position	Record							
Competition	First match	Last match	Starting round	Final position	Pld	W	D	L	GF	GA	GD	Win %
La Liga	18 August 2019	19 July 2020	Matchday 1	2nd	38	25	7	6	86	38	+48	65.79
Copa del Rey	22 January 2020	6 February 2020	Round of 32	Quarter-finals	3	2	0	1	7	2	+5	66.67
Supercopa de España	9 January 2020		Semi-finals	Semi-finals	1	0	0	1	2	3	−1	0.00
Champions League	17 September 2019	14 August 2020	Group stage	Quarter-finals	9	5	3	1	15	14	+1	55.56
Total					51	32	10	9	110	57	+53	62.75

Last updated: 14 August 2020
Source: Soccerway

=== La Liga ===
==== Standings ====
Pos	Team	Pld	W	D	L	GF	GA	GD	Pts	Qualification or relegation
1	Real Madrid (C)	38	26	9	3	70	25	+45	87	Qualification for the Champions League group stage
2	Barcelona	38	25	7	6	86	38	+48	82	Qualification for the Champions League group stage
3	Atlético Madrid	38	18	16	4	51	27	+24	70	Qualification for the Champions League group stage
4	Sevilla	38	19	13	6	54	34	+20	70	Qualification for the Champions League group stage
5	Villarreal	38	18	6	14	63	49	+14	60	Qualification for the Europa League group stage

Source: La Liga, Soccerway
Rules for classification: 1) Points; 2) Head-to-head points; 3) Head-to-head goal difference; 4) Goal difference; 5) Goals scored; 6) Fair-play points (Note: Head-to-head record is used only after all the matches between the teams in question have been played)
(C) Champions

==== Results summary ====
Overall								Home						Away					
Pld	W	D	L	GF	GA	GD	Pts	W	D	L	GF	GA	GD	W	D	L	GF	GA	GD
38	25	7	6	86	38	+48	82	16	2	1	52	16	+36	9	5	5	34	22	+12

Last updated: 19 July 2020.
Source: La Liga

==== Results by round ====
Round	1	2	3	4	5	6	7	8	9	10	11	12	13	14	15	16	17	18	19	20	21	22	23	24	25	26	27	28	29	30	31	32	33	34	35	36	37	38
Ground	A	H	A	H	A	H	A	H	A	H	A	H	A	A	H	A	H	H	A	H	A	H	A	H	H	A	H	A	H	A	H	A	H	A	H	A	H	A
Result	L	W	D	W	L	W	W	W	W	W	L	W	W	W	W	D	D	W	D	W	L	W	W	W	W	L	W	W	W	D	W	D	D	W	W	W	L	W
Position	16	9	8	5	8	6	4	2	1	1	1	1	1	1	1	1	1	1	1	1	2	2	2	2	1	2	1	1	1	2	2	2	2	2	2	2	2	2

Updated to match(es) played on 19 July 2020. Source: La Liga
A = Away; H = Home; W = Win; D = Draw; L = Loss

==== Matches ====
The La Liga schedule was announced on 4 July 2019.

16 August 2019 1	Athletic Bilbao	1–0	Barcelona	Bilbao
21:00 CEST (UTC+2)	Núñez (yellow card) 65'; Aduriz 89'	Report	Piqué (yellow card) 60'	Stadium: San Mamés; Attendance: 47,693; Referee: Carlos del Cerro Grande

25 August 2019 2	Barcelona	5–2	Real Betis	Barcelona
21:00 CEST (UTC+2)	Piqué (yellow card) 32'; Griezmann 41', 50'; Pérez 56'; Alba 60'; Vidal 77'	Report	Fekir 15'; Loren 79'; Carvalho (yellow card) 90'	Stadium: Camp Nou; Attendance: 79,159; Referee: José Luis González González

31 August 2019 3	Osasuna	2–2	Barcelona	Pamplona
17:00 CEST (UTC+2)	Torres 7', 81' (pen.); Mérida (yellow card) 13'; Brandon (yellow card) 43'; Moncayola (yellow card) 90+1'	Report	Roberto (yellow card) 32'; De Jong (yellow card) 37'; Fati 51'; Arthur 64'; Piqué (yellow card) 82'; Lenglet (yellow card) 90+4'	Stadium: El Sadar; Attendance: 16,742; Referee: Juan Martínez Munuera

14 September 2019 4	Barcelona	5–2	Valencia	Barcelona
21:00 CEST (UTC+2)	Fati 2'; De Jong 7'; Piqué 51'; Alba (yellow card) 53'; Suárez 61', 82'	Report	Gameiro 27'; Rodrigo (yellow card) 31'; Lee Kang-in (yellow card) 69'; Gómez (yellow card) 78', (goal) 90+2'; Cheryshev (yellow card) 84'	Stadium: Camp Nou; Attendance: 81,617; Referee: José María Sánchez Martínez

21 September 2019 5	Granada	2–0	Barcelona	Granada
21:00 CEST (UTC+2)	Azeez 2'; Soldado (yellow card) 48'; Herrera (yellow card) 49'; Vadillo 66' (pen.); Fernández (yellow card) 87'	Report	Suárez (yellow card) 21'; Piqué (yellow card) 45+4'	Stadium: Nuevo Los Cármenes; Attendance: 18,880; Referee: Guillermo Cuadra Fernández

24 September 2019 6	Barcelona	2–1	Villarreal	Barcelona
21:00 CEST (UTC+2)	Griezmann 6', (yellow card) 47'; Arthur 15'; Roberto (yellow card) 27'; Junior (yellow card) 82'; Busquets (yellow card) 90'	Report	Cazorla 44'; Zambo Anguissa (yellow card) 72'; Albiol (yellow card) 82'	Stadium: Camp Nou; Attendance: 70,316; Referee: Ricardo de Burgos Bengoetxea

28 September 2019 7	Getafe	0–2	Barcelona	Getafe
16:00 CEST (UTC+2)	Bruno (yellow card) 35'; Kenedy (yellow card) 63'; Maksimović (yellow card) 64'; Cucurella (yellow card) 90+3'	Report	Suárez 41'; Busquets (yellow card) 44'; Lenglet (yellow card) 47' (yellow-red card) 82'; Junior 49'; Roberto (yellow card) 77'	Stadium: Coliseum Alfonso Pérez; Attendance: 15,135; Referee: Jesús Gil Manzano

6 October 2019 8	Barcelona	4–0	Sevilla	Barcelona
21:00 CEST (UTC+2)	Suárez 27', (yellow card) 64'; Vidal 32'; Dembélé 35', (yellow card) 53' (red card) 88'; Semedo (yellow card) 39'; Messi 78'; Piqué (yellow card) 85'; Araújo (red card) 87'; Busquets (yellow card) 88'	Report	Reguilón (yellow card) 22'; Carriço (yellow card) 34'; Banega (yellow card) 90+1'	Stadium: Camp Nou; Attendance: 81,331; Referee: Antonio Mateu Lahoz

19 October 2019 9	Eibar	0–3	Barcelona	Eibar
13:00 CEST (UTC+2)	Charles (yellow card) 24'; Diop (yellow card) 24'; Álvarez (yellow card) 82'; Inui (yellow card) 88'; Expósito (yellow card) 90+2'	Report	Griezmann 13'; Messi 58'; Suárez 66'	Stadium: Ipurua; Attendance: 7,295; Referee: Mario Melero López

29 October 2019 10	Barcelona	5–1	Valladolid	Barcelona
21:15 CET (UTC+1)	Lenglet 2'; Vidal 29'; Messi 34', 75'; Suárez 77'	Report	Kiko 15'; Joaquín (yellow card) 45'; Guardiola (yellow card) 68'; Míchel (yellow card) 79'	Stadium: Camp Nou; Attendance: 59,896; Referee: Javier Alberola Rojas

2 November 2019 11	Levante	3–1	Barcelona	Valencia
16:00 CET (UTC+1)	Bardhi (yellow card) 52'; Campaña 61'; Mayoral 63'; Radoja 68'	Report	Arthur (yellow card) 12'; Messi 38' (pen.); Griezmann (yellow card) 56'; Piqué (yellow card) 66'; Lenglet (yellow card) 67'; Roberto (yellow card) 81'; Fati (yellow card) 86'	Stadium: Ciutat de València; Attendance: 23,341; Referee: Alejandro Hernández Hernández

9 November 2019 12	Barcelona	4–1	Celta Vigo	Barcelona
21:00 CET (UTC+1)	Messi 23' (pen.), 45+1', 48', (yellow card) 40'; Umtiti (yellow card) 25'; Roberto (yellow card) 52'; Busquets 85', (yellow card) 88'	Report	Olaza 42'; Beltrán (yellow card) 45'	Stadium: Camp Nou; Attendance: 71,209; Referee: Guillermo Cuadra Fernández

23 November 2019 13	Leganés	1–2	Barcelona	Leganés
13:00 CET (UTC+1)	En-Nesyri 12'; Mesa (yellow card) 20'	Report	Busquets (yellow card) 39'; Suárez 53'; Vidal 79', (yellow card) 90'	Stadium: Butarque; Attendance: 9,465; Referee: Santiago Jaime Latre

1 December 2019 14	Atlético Madrid	0–1	Barcelona	Madrid
21:00 CET (UTC+1)	Partey (yellow card) 8'; Correa (yellow card) 21'; Vitolo (yellow card) 69'; Felipe (yellow card) 73'	Report	Junior (yellow card) 18'; Piqué (yellow card) 32'; Rakitić (yellow card) 51'; Lenglet (yellow card) 65'; Messi 86'	Stadium: Wanda Metropolitano; Attendance: 64,226; Referee: Antonio Mateu Lahoz

7 December 2019 15	Barcelona	5–2	Mallorca	Barcelona
21:00 CET (UTC+1)	Griezmann 7'; Roberto (yellow card) 8'; Messi 17', 41', 83'; Suárez 43'; Piqué (yellow card) 67'; Vidal (yellow card) 79'	Report	Budimir 35', 64'	Stadium: Camp Nou; Attendance: 71,072; Referee: José Luis Munuera Montero

14 December 2019 16	Real Sociedad	2–2	Barcelona	San Sebastián
16:00 CET (UTC+1)	Oyarzabal 12' (pen.); Isak 62'	Report	Griezmann 38'; Suárez 49', (yellow card) 74'	Stadium: Anoeta; Attendance: 36,639; Referee: Javier Alberola Rojas

18 December 2019 17	Barcelona	0–0	Real Madrid	Barcelona
20:00 CET (UTC+1)	Rakitić (yellow card) 21'; Suárez (yellow card) 40'; Lenglet (yellow card) 45'	Report	Casemiro (yellow card) 66'; Bale (yellow card) 70'; Isco (yellow card) 76'; Ramos (yellow card) 78'; Carvajal (yellow card) 90+2'	Stadium: Camp Nou; Attendance: 93,426; Referee: Alejandro Hernández Hernández
Note: The match was scheduled for 26 October 2019, but was postponed on 18 October due to the 2019 Catalan protests.

21 December 2019 18	Barcelona	4–1	Alavés	Barcelona
16:00 CET (UTC+1)	Griezmann 14'; Vidal 45'; Umtiti (yellow card) 67'; Messi 69'; Suárez 75' (pen.); Alba (yellow card) 88'	Report	Pons 56'; Vidal (yellow card) 66'; Wakaso (yellow card) 67'; Aguirregabiria (yellow card) 74'; Ely (yellow card) 84'	Stadium: Camp Nou; Attendance: 63,054; Referee: Mario Melero López

4 January 2020 19	Espanyol	2–2	Barcelona	Barcelona
21:00 CET (UTC+1)	Da. López 23'; J. López (yellow card) 35'; Roca (yellow card) 62'; Wu Lei 88'	Report	Suárez 50'; Vidal 59'; De Jong (yellow card) 66' (yellow-red card) 75'	Stadium: RCDE Stadium; Attendance: 33,562; Referee: Carlos del Cerro Grande

19 January 2020 20	Barcelona	1–0	Granada	Barcelona
21:00 CET (UTC+1)	Messi 76'	Report	Machís (yellow card) 12'; Sánchez (yellow card) 59' (yellow-red card) 69'; Fernández (yellow card) 72'	Stadium: Camp Nou; Attendance: 65,444; Referee: Valentín Pizarro Gómez

25 January 2020 21	Valencia	2–0	Barcelona	Valencia
16:00 CET (UTC+1)	Gómez 48', 77'; Coquelin (yellow card) 54'	Report	Piqué (yellow card) 10'; Umtiti (yellow card) 43'; Busquets (yellow card) 52'	Stadium: Mestalla; Attendance: 45,882; Referee: Jesús Gil Manzano

2 February 2020 22	Barcelona	2–1	Levante	Barcelona
21:00 CET (UTC+1)	Fati 30', 31'; Piqué (yellow card) 65'; Alba (yellow card) 65'	Report	Rochina 90+2'	Stadium: Camp Nou; Attendance: 60,295; Referee: Adrián Cordero Vega

9 February 2020 23	Real Betis	2–3	Barcelona	Seville
21:00 CET (UTC+1)	Canales 6' (pen.); Fekir 26', (yellow card) 76' (yellow-red card) 76'; Emerson (yellow card) 36'; Mandi (yellow card) 45+2'; Joaquín (yellow card) 72'	Report	Lenglet (yellow card) 5' (yellow-red card) 79', (goal) 72'; De Jong 9'; Roberto (yellow card) 29'; Vidal (yellow card) 32'; Busquets 45+3', (yellow card) 57'	Stadium: Benito Villamarín; Attendance: 54,526; Referee: José María Sánchez Martínez

15 February 2020 24	Barcelona	2–1	Getafe	Barcelona
16:00 CET (UTC+1)	Griezmann 33'; Roberto 39'; Umtiti (yellow card) 49'; Junior (yellow card) 82'; Fati (yellow card) 85'	Report	Ángel 66'; Mata (yellow card) 73'; Kenedy (yellow card) 89'	Stadium: Camp Nou; Attendance: 78,814; Referee: Guillermo Cuadra Fernández

22 February 2020 25	Barcelona	5–0	Eibar	Barcelona
16:00 CET (UTC+1)	Messi 14', 37', 40', 87'; Arthur 89'	Report	Escalante (yellow card) 64'; Diop (yellow card) 85'	Stadium: Camp Nou; Attendance: 66,970; Referee: César Soto Grado

1 March 2020 26	Real Madrid	2–0	Barcelona	Madrid
21:00 CET (UTC+1)	Vinícius (yellow card) 10', (goal) 71'; Carvajal (yellow card) 19'; Mariano 90+2'	Report	Alba (yellow card) 19'; Messi (yellow card) 85'	Stadium: Santiago Bernabéu; Attendance: 78,357; Referee: Antonio Mateu Lahoz

7 March 2020 27	Barcelona	1–0	Real Sociedad	Barcelona
18:30 CET (UTC+1)	Lenglet (yellow card) 16'; Messi (yellow card) 42', (goal) 81' (pen.); Piqué (yellow card) 61'; Busquets (yellow card) 88'	Report	Merino (yellow card) 57'; Guevara (yellow card) 77'; Oyarzabal (yellow card) 80'	Stadium: Camp Nou; Attendance: 77,035; Referee: Juan Martínez Munuera

13 June 2020 28	Mallorca	0–4	Barcelona	Palma
22:00 CEST (UTC+2)	Rodríguez (yellow card) 86'	Report	Vidal 2', (yellow card) 42'; Braithwaite 37'; Alba (yellow card) 73', (goal) 79'; Messi 90+3'	Stadium: Son Moix; Attendance: 0 Referee: Carlos del Cerro Grande
Note: The match was originally scheduled for 14 March, but was postponed due to the COVID-19 pandemic, and rescheduled to 13 June. It was played behind closed doors.

16 June 2020 29	Barcelona	2–0	Leganés	Barcelona
22:00 CEST (UTC+2)	Fati 42'; Messi 69' (pen.); Umtiti (yellow card) 83'; Puig (yellow card) 84'; Lenglet (yellow card) 84'; Junior (yellow card) 89'; Rakitić (yellow card) 90+3'	Report	Bustinza (yellow card) 37'; Pérez (yellow card) 68'; Awaziem (yellow card) 82'	Stadium: Camp Nou; Attendance: 0 Referee: Juan Martínez Munuera
Note: The match was originally scheduled for 22 March, but was postponed due to the COVID-19 pandemic, and rescheduled to 16 June. It was played behind closed doors.

19 June 2020 30	Sevilla	0–0	Barcelona	Seville
22:00 CEST (UTC+2)	Reguilón (yellow card) 26'; Fernando (yellow card) 45+4'; Banega (yellow card) 62'	Report	Piqué (yellow card) 39'; Busquets (yellow card) 45+4'	Stadium: Ramón Sánchez Pizjuán; Attendance: 0 Referee: José Luis González González
Note: The match was originally scheduled for 5 April, but was postponed due to the COVID-19 pandemic. and rescheduled to 19 June. It was played behind closed doors.

23 June 2020 31	Barcelona	1–0	Athletic Bilbao	Barcelona
22:00 CEST (UTC+2)	Busquets (yellow card) 32'; Rakitić 71', (yellow card) 90+1'	Report	Núñez (yellow card) 62'	Stadium: Camp Nou; Attendance: 0 Referee: Jesús Gil Manzano
Note: The match was originally scheduled for 12 April, but was postponed due to the COVID-19 pandemic, and rescheduled to 23 June. It was played behind closed doors.

27 June 2020 32	Celta Vigo	2–2	Barcelona	Vigo
17:00 CEST (UTC+2)	Méndez (yellow card) 34'; Smolov 50'; Araujo (yellow card) 61'; Aspas 88', (yellow card) 89'	Report	Alba (yellow card) 12'; Suárez 20', 67'; Umtiti (yellow card) 53'; Braithwaite (yellow card) 82'; Piqué (yellow card) 90+5'	Stadium: Abanca-Balaídos; Attendance: 0 Referee: Guillermo Cuadra Fernández
Note: The match was originally scheduled for 22 April, but was postponed due to the COVID-19 pandemic, and rescheduled to 27 June. It was played behind closed doors.

30 June 2020 33	Barcelona	2–2	Atlético Madrid	Barcelona
22:00 CEST (UTC+2)	Costa 11' (o.g.); Ter Stegen (yellow card) 17'; Piqué (yellow card) 18'; Messi 50' (pen.), (yellow card) 61'	Report	Saúl 19' (pen.), 62' (pen.), (yellow card) 35'; Felipe (yellow card) 51'; Costa (yellow card) 75'; Carrasco (yellow card) 80'; Lemar (yellow card) 90+4'	Stadium: Camp Nou; Attendance: 0 Referee: Alejandro Hernández Hernández
Note: The match was originally scheduled for 26 April, but was postponed due to the COVID-19 pandemic, and rescheduled to 30 June. It was played behind closed doors.

5 July 2020 34	Villarreal	1–4	Barcelona	Villarreal
22:00 CEST (UTC+2)	Gerard 14'; Torres (yellow card) 18'	Report	Torres 3' (o.g.); Suárez 20'; Griezmann 45'; Fati 86'	Stadium: Estadio de la Cerámica; Attendance: 0 Referee: Carlos del Cerro Grande
Note: The match was originally scheduled for 3 May, but was postponed due to the COVID-19 pandemic, and rescheduled to 5 July. It was played behind closed doors.

8 July 2020 35	Barcelona	1–0	Espanyol	Barcelona
22:00 CEST (UTC+2)	Fati (red card) 50'; Suárez 56'	Report	De Tomás (yellow card) 45'; Lozano (red card) 53'; Da. López (yellow card) 90+4'	Stadium: Camp Nou; Attendance: 0 Referee: José Luis Munuera Montero
Note: The match was originally scheduled for 10 May, but was postponed due to the COVID-19 pandemic, and rescheduled to 8 July. It was played behind closed doors.

11 July 2020 36	Valladolid	0–1	Barcelona	Valladolid
19:30 CEST (UTC+2)	Alcaraz (yellow card) 45'; Pérez (yellow card) 65'	Report	Vidal 15'; Lenglet (yellow card) 40'; Alba (yellow card) 78'	Stadium: José Zorrilla; Attendance: 0 Referee: Antonio Mateu Lahoz
Note: The match was originally scheduled for 13 May, but was postponed due to the COVID-19 pandemic, and rescheduled to 12 July. It was played behind closed doors.

16 July 2020 37	Barcelona	1–2	Osasuna	Barcelona
21:00 CEST (UTC+2)	Semedo (yellow card) 54'; Rakitić (yellow card) 57'; Messi 62'; Piqué (yellow card) 69'; Junior (yellow card) 75'	Report	Arnaiz 15'; Estupiñán (yellow card) 63'; Gallego (red card) 77'; Torres 90+4'	Stadium: Camp Nou; Attendance: 0 Referee: José María Sánchez Martínez
Note: The match was originally scheduled for 17 May, but was postponed due to the COVID-19 pandemic, and rescheduled to 16 July. It was played behind closed doors.

19 July 2020 38	Alavés	0–5	Barcelona	Vitoria-Gasteiz
17:00 CEST (UTC+2)		Report	Fati 24'; Messi 34', 75'; Suárez 44'; Semedo 57'	Stadium: Mendizorrotza; Attendance: 0 Referee: Juan Martínez Munuera
Note: The match was originally scheduled for 24 May, but was postponed due to the COVID-19 pandemic, and rescheduled to 19 July. It was played behind closed doors.

=== Copa del Rey ===
22 January 2020 Round of 32	Ibiza	1–2	Barcelona	Ibiza
19:00 CET (UTC+1)	Caballe 9'; Kike (yellow card) 61'; Mendoza (yellow card) 78'; Sibo (yellow card) 83'; Grima (yellow card) 88'; Núñez (yellow card) 90+5'	Report	Griezmann 72', 90+4'; Fati (yellow card) 90+3'	Stadium: Estadi Municipal de Can Misses; Attendance: 6,500; Referee: Pablo González Fuertes

30 January 2020 Round of 16	Barcelona	5–0	Leganés	Barcelona
19:00 CET (UTC+1)	Griezmann 4'; Lenglet 27'; Messi 59', 89'; Arthur 77'	Report	Pérez (yellow card) 25'; Awaziem (yellow card) 73'; Tarín (yellow card) 83'	Stadium: Camp Nou; Attendance: 43,216; Referee: Guillermo Cuadra Fernández

6 February 2020 Quarter-finals	Athletic Bilbao	1–0	Barcelona	Bilbao
21:00 CET (UTC+1)	Yeray (yellow card) 44'; Vesga (yellow card) 53'; D. García (yellow card) 64'; Busquets 90+3' (o.g.)	Report	Semedo (yellow card) 6'; Messi (yellow card) 39'; Alba (yellow card) 40'; De Jong (yellow card) 57'; Piqué (yellow card) 72'; Arthur (yellow card) 82'	Stadium: San Mamés; Attendance: 49,154; Referee: Juan Martínez Munuera

=== Supercopa de España ===
9 January 2020 Semi-final	Barcelona	2–3	Atlético Madrid	Jeddah, Saudi Arabia
22:00 AST (UTC+3)	Piqué (yellow card) 15'; Suárez (yellow card) 45+3'; Messi 51'; Griezmann 62'; Vidal (yellow card) 77'; Neto (yellow card) 80'	Report	Partey (yellow card) 35'; Savić (yellow card) 45+3'; Koke 46'; Felipe (yellow card) 64'; Llorente (yellow card) 72'; Morata 82' (pen.); Correa 86'	Stadium: King Abdullah Sports City; Attendance: 58,410; Referee: José Luis González González

=== UEFA Champions League ===
==== Group stage ====
Group F

Pos	Team	Pld	W	D	L	GF	GA	GD	Pts	Qualification	BAR	DOR	INT	SLP
1	(Spain) Barcelona	6	4	2	0	9	4	+5	14	Advance to knockout phase	—	3–1	2–1	0–0
2	(Germany) Borussia Dortmund	6	3	1	2	8	8	0	10	Advance to knockout phase	0–0	—	3–2	2–1
3	(Italy) Inter Milan	6	2	1	3	10	9	+1	7	Transfer to Europa League	1–2	2–0	—	1–1
4	(Czech Republic) Slavia Prague	6	0	2	4	4	10	−6	2		1–2	0–2	1–3	—

Source: UEFA
Rules for classification: Group stage tiebreakers

17 September 2019 1	Borussia Dortmund (Germany)	0–0	(Spain) Barcelona	Dortmund, Germany
21:00 CEST (UTC+2)	Delaney (yellow card) 15'; Hazard (yellow card) 47'	Report	Piqué (yellow card) 50'; Semedo (yellow card) 56'; Rakitić (yellow card) 70'	Stadium: Westfalenstadion; Attendance: 66,099; Referee: Ovidiu Haţegan (Romania)

2 October 2019 2	Barcelona (Spain)	2–1	(Italy) Inter Milan	Barcelona, Spain
21:00 CEST (UTC+2)	Griezmann (yellow card) 9'; Piqué (yellow card) 22'; Roberto (yellow card) 52'; Suárez 58', 84'; Vidal (yellow card) 76'	Report	Martínez 3'; Barella (yellow card) 6'; Sánchez (yellow card) 77'	Stadium: Camp Nou; Attendance: 86,141; Referee: Damir Skomina (Slovenia)

23 October 2019 3	Slavia Prague (Czech Republic)	1–2	(Spain) Barcelona	Prague, Czech Republic
21:00 CEST (UTC+2)	Bořil 50', (yellow card) 64'; Masopust (yellow card) 56'; Olayinka (yellow card) 71'; Ševčík (yellow card) 76'	Report	Messi 3'; Alba (yellow card) 35'; Olayinka 57' (o.g.); O. Dembélé (yellow card) 90+5'	Stadium: Sinobo Stadium; Attendance: 19,170; Referee: Bobby Madden (Scotland)

5 November 2019 4	Barcelona (Spain)	0–0	(Czech Republic) Slavia Prague	Barcelona, Spain
18:55 CET (UTC+1)	Piqué (yellow card) 14'; Semedo (yellow card) 32'; Busquets (yellow card) 43'	Report	Olayinka (yellow card) 21'; Stanciu (yellow card) 48'; Hušbauer (yellow card) 82'; Kúdela (yellow card) 84'; Kolář (yellow card) 90+3'	Stadium: Camp Nou; Attendance: 67,023; Referee: Michael Oliver (England)

27 November 2019 5	Barcelona (Spain)	3–1	(Germany) Borussia Dortmund	Barcelona, Spain
21:00 CET (UTC+1)	Suárez 29'; Messi 33', (yellow card) 51'; Griezmann 67'; Busquets (yellow card) 71'	Report	Guerreiro (yellow card) 74'; Sancho 77'	Stadium: Camp Nou; Attendance: 90,071; Referee: Clément Turpin (France)

10 December 2019 6	Inter Milan (Italy)	1–2	(Spain) Barcelona	Milan, Italy
21:00 CET (UTC+1)	Lukaku 44'; Valero (yellow card) 45+1'; De Vrij (yellow card) 88'; Godín (yellow card) 90+2'	Report	Pérez 23'; Lenglet (yellow card) 35'; Junior (yellow card) 49'; Fati 86'	Stadium: San Siro; Attendance: 71,818; Referee: Björn Kuipers (Netherlands)

==== Knockout phase ====
===== Round of 16 =====
25 February 2020 First leg	Napoli (Italy)	1–1	(Spain) Barcelona	Naples, Italy
21:00 CET (UTC+1)	Mertens 30'; Insigne (yellow card) 61'; Mário Rui (yellow card) 89'	Report	Busquets (yellow card) 49'; Griezmann 57', (yellow card) 83'; Messi (yellow card) 66'; Vidal (yellow card) 89' (yellow-red card) 89'	Stadium: Stadio San Paolo; Attendance: 44,388; Referee: Felix Brych (Germany)

8 August 2020 Second leg	Barcelona (Spain)	3–1 (4–2 agg.)	(Italy) Napoli	Barcelona, Spain
21:00 CEST (UTC+2)	Lenglet 10'; Messi 23'; Suárez 45+1' (pen.), (yellow card) 90+2'	Report	Insigne 45+5' (pen.); Zieliński (yellow card) 60'	Stadium: Camp Nou; Attendance: 0 Referee: Cüneyt Çakır (Turkey)
Note: The match between Barcelona and Napoli in Barcelona was meant to be played behind closed doors due to an outbreak of COVID-19 in Spain. However, on 13 March, the match was indefinitely postponed due to a pandemic of COVID-19 in Spain. The match was rescheduled on 17 June to 8 August.

===== Quarter-final =====
14 August 2020 Quarter-finals	Barcelona (Spain)	2–8	(Germany) Bayern Munich	Lisbon, Portugal
21:00 CEST (UTC+2)	Alaba 7' (o.g.); Suárez (yellow card) 54', (goal) 57'; Alba (yellow card) 60'; Vidal (yellow card) 90+2'	Report	Müller 4', 31'; Perišić 22'; Gnabry 27'; Boateng (yellow card) 42'; Davies (yellow card) 52'; Kimmich 63', (yellow card) 85'; Lewandowski 82'; Coutinho 85', 89'	Stadium: Estádio da Luz; Attendance: 0 Referee: Damir Skomina (Slovenia)

== Statistics ==
=== Squad appearances and goals ===
Last updated on 14 August 2020.

No.	Pos	Nat	Player	Total		La Liga		Champions League		Copa del Rey		Supercopa	
No.	Pos	Nat	Player	Apps	Goals	Apps	Goals	Apps	Goals	Apps	Goals	Apps	Goals
Goalkeepers
1	GK	(Germany) GER	Marc-André ter Stegen	46	0	36	0	8	0	2	0	0	0
13	GK	(Brazil) BRA	Neto	5	0	2	0	1	0	1	0	1	0
Defenders
2	DF	(Portugal) POR	Nélson Semedo	42	1	24+8	1	7	0	3	0	0	0
3	DF	(Spain) ESP	Gerard Piqué	45	1	35	1	7	0	2	0	1	0
15	DF	(France) FRA	Clément Lenglet	40	4	28	2	8+1	1	3	1	0	0
18	DF	(Spain) ESP	Jordi Alba	36	2	25+2	2	5	0	2+1	0	1	0
23	DF	(France) FRA	Samuel Umtiti	18	0	10+3	0	3	0	0+1	0	1	0
24	DF	(Spain) ESP	Junior Firpo	23	1	11+6	1	3+1	0	1+1	0	0	0
33	DF	(Uruguay) URU	Ronald Araújo	6	0	2+4	0	0	0	0	0	0	0
Midfielders
4	MF	(Croatia) CRO	Ivan Rakitić	42	1	16+15	1	4+3	0	2+1	0	0+1	0
5	MF	(Spain) ESP	Sergio Busquets	43	2	29+4	2	7	0	2	0	1	0
8	MF	(Brazil) BRA	Arthur	28	4	14+7	3	3+1	0	0+3	1	0	0
20	MF	(Spain) ESP	Sergi Roberto	39	1	27+3	1	4+2	0	2	0	1	0
21	MF	(Netherlands) NED	Frenkie de Jong	42	2	24+5	2	8+1	0	3	0	1	0
22	MF	(Chile) CHI	Arturo Vidal	43	8	16+17	8	4+3	0	1+1	0	1	0
28	MF	(Spain) ESP	Riqui Puig	12	0	5+6	0	0	0	1	0	0	0
30	MF	(Spain) ESP	Álex Collado	1	0	0+1	0	0	0	0	0	0	0
42	MF	(Spain) ESP	Monchu	1	0	0	0	0+1	0	0	0	0	0
Forwards
9	FW	(Uruguay) URU	Luis Suárez	36	21	22+6	16	6+1	5	0	0	1	0
10	FW	(Argentina) ARG	Lionel Messi	44	31	32+1	25	7+1	3	2	2	1	1
11	FW	(France) FRA	Ousmane Dembélé	9	1	3+2	1	2+2	0	0	0	0	0
17	FW	(France) FRA	Antoine Griezmann	48	15	31+4	9	7+2	2	2+1	3	1	1
19	FW	(Denmark) DEN	Martin Braithwaite	11	1	4+7	1	0	0	0	0	0	0
31	FW	(Spain) ESP	Ansu Fati	33	8	11+13	7	1+4	1	3	0	0+1	0
Players who have made an appearance or had a squad number this season but have left the club
6	DF	(France) FRA	Jean-Clair Todibo	3	0	1+1	0	1	0	0	0	0	0
16	DF	(Senegal) SEN	Moussa Wagué	3	0	1	0	1+1	0	0	0	0	0
19	MF	(Spain) ESP	Carles Aleñá	5	0	2+2	0	1	0	0	0	0	0
27	FW	(Spain) ESP	Carles Pérez	12	2	5+5	1	1	1	1	0	0	0
12	MF	(Brazil) BRA	Rafinha	3	0	3	0	0	0	0	0	0	0
7	FW	(Brazil) BRA	Philippe Coutinho	0	0	0	0	0	0	0	0	0	0

=== Squad statistics ===
As of 16 February 2020

	League	Europe	Cup	Others	Total
Games played	38	9	3	1	51
Games won	25	5	2	0	32
Games drawn	7	3	0	0	10
Games lost	6	0	1	1	8
Goals scored	86	15	7	2	110
Goals conceded	38	14	2	3	57
Goal difference	48	1	5	-1	53
Clean sheets	15	2	1	0	18
Goal by Substitute	10	2	1	0	13
Total shots	307	81	36	16	404
Shots on target	139	31	17	19	206
Corners	114	26	12	6	158
Players used	26	23	19	13	27
Offsides	55	8	7	2	72
Fouls suffered	333	79	53	14	479
Fouls committed	272	70	33	18	393
Yellow cards	85	20	7	4	116
Red cards	6	1	0	0	7

=== Goalscorers ===
No.	Pos.	Nat.	Name	La Liga	Champions League	Copa del Rey	Supercopa de España	Total
10	FW	(Argentina)	Lionel Messi	25	3	2	1	31
9	FW	(Uruguay)	Luis Suárez	16	5	0	0	21
17	FW	(France)	Antoine Griezmann	9	2	3	1	15
22	MF	(Chile)	Arturo Vidal	8	0	0	0	8
31	FW	(Spain)	Ansu Fati	7	1	0	0	8
8	MF	(Brazil)	Arthur	3	0	1	0	4
15	DF	(France)	Clément Lenglet	2	1	1	0	4
5	MF	(Spain)	Sergio Busquets	2	0	0	0	2
18	DF	(Spain)	Jordi Alba	2	0	0	0	2
21	MF	(Netherlands)	Frenkie de Jong	2	0	0	0	2
27	FW	(Spain)	Carles Pérez	1	1	0	0	2
2	DF	(Portugal)	Nélson Semedo	1	0	0	0	1
3	DF	(Spain)	Gerard Piqué	1	0	0	0	1
4	MF	(Croatia)	Ivan Rakitić	1	0	0	0	1
11	FW	(France)	Ousmane Dembélé	1	0	0	0	1
19	FW	(Denmark)	Martin Braithwaite	1	0	0	0	1
20	MF	(Spain)	Sergi Roberto	1	0	0	0	1
24	DF	(Spain)	Junior Firpo	1	0	0	0	1
Own goals				2	2	0	0	4
TOTAL				86	15	7	2	110

As of match played 14 August 2020.

=== Hat-tricks ===
Player	Against	Result	Date	Competition	Ref
(Argentina) Lionel Messi	(Spain) Celta Vigo	4–1 (H)	9 November 2019	La Liga	
(Argentina) Lionel Messi	(Spain) Mallorca	5–2 (H)	7 December 2019	La Liga	
(Argentina) Lionel Messi^{4}	(Spain) Eibar	5–0 (H)	22 February 2020	La Liga	

(H) – Home; (A) – Away

=== Disciplinary record ===
N	P	Nat.	Name	La Liga			Champions League			Copa del Rey			Supercopa de España			Total			Notes
N	P	Nat.	Name	Yellow card	Second yellow card	Red card	Yellow card	Second yellow card	Red card	Yellow card	Second yellow card	Red card	Yellow card	Second yellow card	Red card	Yellow card	Second yellow card	Red card	Notes
1	GK	(Germany)	Marc-André ter Stegen	1												1			
2	DF	(Portugal)	Nélson Semedo	2			2			1						5			
3	DF	(Spain)	Gerard Piqué	15			3			1			1			20			
4	MF	(Croatia)	Ivan Rakitić	5			1									6			
5	MF	(Spain)	Sergio Busquets	10			3									13			
8	MF	(Brazil)	Arthur	1						1						2			
9	FW	(Uruguay)	Luis Suárez	4			2						1			7			
10	FW	(Argentina)	Lionel Messi	4			2			1						7			
11	FW	(France)	Ousmane Dembélé	1		1	1									2		1	
13	GK	(Brazil)	Neto										1			1			
15	DF	(France)	Clément Lenglet	9	2		1									10	2		
17	FW	(France)	Antoine Griezmann	2			2									4			
18	DF	(Spain)	Jordi Alba	7			2			1						10			
19	FW	(Denmark)	Martin Braithwaite	1												1			
20	MF	(Spain)	Sergi Roberto	7			1									8			
21	MF	(Netherlands)	Frenkie de Jong	2	1					1						3	1		
22	MF	(Chile)	Arturo Vidal	4			3	1					1			8	1		
23	DF	(France)	Samuel Umtiti	6												6			
24	DF	(Spain)	Junior Firpo	5			1									6			
28	MF	(Spain)	Riqui Puig	1												1			
31	FW	(Spain)	Ansu Fati	2		1				1						3		1	
33	DF	(Uruguay)	Ronald Araújo			1												1	

Last updated: 18 April 2021
Source: FCBarcelona.com
Ordered by (red card) , (second yellow card) and (yellow card)
(yellow card) = Number of bookings; (second yellow card) = Number of sending offs after a second yellow card; (red card) = Number of sending offs by a direct red card.

=== Injury record ===
N	P	Nat.	Name	Type	Status	Source	Match	Inj. Date	Ret. Date
10	FW	(Argentina)	Messi	right calf injury		FCB.com	Pre-Season	5 August 2019	21 August 2019
13	GK	(Brazil)	Neto	left wrist injury		FCB.com	Pre-Season	11 August 2019	13 September 2019
9	FW	(Uruguay)	Suárez	right calf injury		FCB.com	vs Athletic Bilbao	16 August 2019	10 September 2019
11	FW	(France)	Dembélé	left hamstring injury		FCB.com	in training	19 August 2019	22 September 2019
10	FW	(Argentina)	Messi	right calf injury		Mundo Deportivo	in training	28 August 2019	15 September 2019
24	DF	(Spain)	Junior	strained ligament in left knee		FCB.com	in training	31 August 2019	6 September 2019
23	DF	(France)	Umtiti	small fracture to the second metatarsal		FCB.com	in training with France	13 September 2019	18 October 2019
18	DF	(Spain)	Jordi Alba	left hamstring injury		FCB.com	vs Borussia Dortmund	17 September 2019	5 October 2019
10	FW	(Argentina)	Messi	left adductor injury		FCB.com	vs Villarreal CF	24 September 2019	30 September 2019
11	FW	(France)	Dembélé	left hamstring injury		FCB.com	in training	28 September 2019	30 September 2019
24	DF	(Spain)	Junior	right hamstring injury		FCB.com	in training	1 October 2019	18 October 2019
20	DF	(Spain)	Sergi Roberto	strained ligament in left knee		FCB.com	vs Eibar	19 October 2019	29 October 2019
23	DF	(France)	Umtiti	bruised knee		FCB.com	in training	22 October 2019	4 November 2019
9	FW	(Uruguay)	Suárez	right calf injury		FCB.com	vs Levante	2 November 2019	8 November 2019
18	DF	(Spain)	Jordi Alba	left hamstring injury		FCB.com	vs Slavia Prague	5 November 2019	13 December 2019
2	DF	(Portugal)	Nélson Semedo	left calf injury		FCB.com	vs Celta vigo	9 November 2019	13 December 2019
15	DF	(France)	Clement Lenglet	calf injury		FCB.com	in training with France	18 November 2019	28 November 2019
11	FW	(France)	Dembélé	right thigh injury		FCB.com	vs Borussia Dortmund	27 November 2019	13 August 2020
8	MF	(Brazil)	Arthur	groin injury		FCB.com	in training	6 December 2019	22 January 2020
1	GK	(Germany)	Marc-Andre ter Stegen	right knee injury		FCB.com	in training	22 December 2019	22 January 2020
9	FW	(Uruguay)	Suárez	right knee injury		FCB.com	in training	12 January 2020	07 June 2020
13	GK	(Brazil)	Neto	sprained left ankle		FCB.com	vs Ibiza	22 January 2020	21 February 2020

- Player is injured
- Player has recovered from injury
Last updated: 08 June 2020
