= Moussa Wagué =

Senegalese footballer (born in 1998)

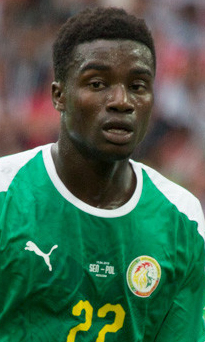
- Wagué playing for Senegal at the 2018 FIFA World Cup

Personal information
- Full name: Moussa Wagué
- Date of birth: 4 October 1998 (age 28)
- Place of birth: Bignona, Senegal
- Height: 1.77 m (5 ft 10 in)
- Position: Right-back

Team information
- Current team: Elbasani
- Number: 14

Youth career
- 2014–2016: Aspire Academy
- 2016–2017: Eupen

Senior career*
| Years | Team | Apps | (Gls) |
| 2017–2018 | Eupen | 23 | (1) |
| 2018–2019 | Barcelona B | 20 | (2) |
| 2019–2022 | Barcelona | 4 | (0) |
| 2020 | → Nice (loan) | 5 | (0) |
| 2020 | → PAOK (loan) | 7 | (0) |
| 2022 | Gorica | 13 | (0) |
| 2023–2024 | Anorthosis Famagusta | 28 | (0) |
| 2024–2026 | Panserraikos | 13 | (0) |
| 2026– | Elbasani | 0 | (0) |

International career^{‡}
| 2015–2017 | Senegal U20 | 11 | (1) |
| 2017–2019 | Senegal | 21 | (1) |
Medal record
Men's football
Representing Senegal
Africa Cup of Nations
| Runner-up | 2019 Egypt |
- * Club domestic league appearances and goals as of 24 February 2026 ‡ National team caps and goals as of 23:41, 14 November 2021 (UTC)

Moussa Wagué (born 4 October 1998) is a Senegalese professional footballer who plays as a right-back for Kategoria Superiore club Elbasani and the Senegal national team.

== Club career ==
=== Eupen ===
Wagué joined K.A.S. Eupen from the Aspire Academy in November 2016. He made his professional debut in a 0–1 loss to Genk on 21 January 2017. Wagué spent two seasons with Eupen under coach Claude Makélélé, helping the team stay in the Belgian top division.

=== Barcelona ===
In August 2018, Wagué completed a transfer from Eupen to FC Barcelona for a fee of €5 million. He initially joined the reserves ahead of the 2018–19 season. On 13 January 2019, Wagué scored his first goal for Barcelona B in a 2–0 win at the Miniestadi against CD Alcoyano.

Barcelona manager Ernesto Valverde named Wagué as one of the five promising young players to whom he hoped to give first-team opportunities. Wagué made his senior-side debut on 6 March 2019, starting and playing the full 90 minutes of the Catalan Super Cup against Girona. On 13 April 2019, he made his official debut in a La Liga match against Huesca where he played a full 90 minutes; he described it as a "dream come true". Wagué again featured for the first team on 4 May 2019, impressing despite Barcelona's 0–2 defeat to Celta Vigo. He would appear once more in Barcelona's La Liga finale, coming on as a second-half substitute in a 2–2 draw with Eibar.

Wagué was officially promoted to the first team ahead of the 2019–20 season and given the number 16 shirt. He made his first Champions League start for Barcelona on 10 December 2019, as his side defeated Inter Milan 2–1.

=== Loan to Nice ===
On 31 January 2020, French club OGC Nice confirmed a loan transfer for Wagué, keeping him at the club until the end of the 2019–20 season, with an option to buy for €15,000,000. He made his debut for Nice in their 2–1 victory over Lyon on 2 February 2020, coming on as a second-half substitute. On 7 March 2020, Wagué provided the winning assist in Nice's 2–1 derby victory against rivals AS Monaco. Upon the cancellation of the Ligue 1 season due to the COVID-19 outbreak in France, he returned to Barcelona after Nice decided not to activate his purchase option.

=== Loan to PAOK ===
On 21 September 2020, Barcelona confirmed the loan transfer of Wagué to Greek side PAOK on loan for the rest of the season. On 13 December 2020, he suffered a severe knee injury during PAOK's local derby against Aris Thessaloniki. As a result, he was slated to miss nine months of action.

=== Gorica ===
On 18 July 2022, he joined Prva HNL club Gorica On 9 December 2022, he was released from the club after having his contract mutually terminated.

=== Anorthosis Famagusta ===
On 28 June 2023, Wagué joined Anorthosis Famagusta of the Cypriot First Division.

=== Panserraikos ===
On 11 September 2024, Wagué returned to Greece, joining Super League Greece club Panserraikos and signing a two-year contract.

== International career ==
Wagué was part of the Senegal U20s that finished in the 4th place at the 2015 FIFA U-20 World Cup. He made his senior international debut in a friendly 1–1 tie with Nigeria on 23 March 2017.

In June 2018, Wagué was named in Senegal's 23-man squad for the 2018 FIFA World Cup in Russia. He became the youngest African goalscorer in World Cup history when he scored in Senegal's match against Japan at the age of just 19 years and 263 days.

Wagué represented Senegal in the 2019 Africa Cup of Nations, which took place in Egypt. He participated in the first two group stage games and the semifinal match for a Senegal squad that reached the tournament final.

== Career statistics ==
=== Club ===
As of match played 24 February 2026

Appearances and goals by club, season and competition
| Club | Season | League | | | Cup | | Europe (Note: Includes appearances in UEFA Champions League and UEFA Europa League) | | Other (Note: Includes appearances in Belgian First Division Europa League playoffs) | | Total | |
| Club | Season | Division | Apps | Goals | Apps | Goals | Apps | Goals | Apps | Goals | Apps | Goals |
|---|---|---|---|---|---|---|---|---|---|---|---|---|
| Eupen | 2016–17 | Belgian First Division A | 6 | 1 | 1 | 0 | — | | 8 | 0 | 15 | 1 |
| Eupen | 2017–18 | Belgian First Division A | 17 | 0 | 2 | 0 | — | | 9 | 0 | 28 | 0 |
| Eupen | Total | | 23 | 1 | 3 | 0 | 0 | 0 | 17 | 0 | 43 | 1 |
| Barcelona B | 2018–19 | Segunda División B | 20 | 2 | 0 | 0 | — | | — | | 20 | 2 |
| Barcelona | 2018–19 | La Liga | 3 | 0 | 0 | 0 | 0 | 0 | — | | 3 | 0 |
| Barcelona | 2019–20 | La Liga | 1 | 0 | 0 | 0 | 2 | 0 | — | | 3 | 0 |
| Barcelona | Total | | 4 | 0 | 0 | 0 | 0 | 0 | 0 | 0 | 6 | 0 |
| Nice (loan) | 2019–20 | Ligue 1 | 5 | 0 | 0 | 0 | — | | — | | 5 | 0 |
| PAOK (loan) | 2020–21 | Super League Greece | 7 | 0 | 0 | 0 | 5 | 0 | — | | 12 | 0 |
| Gorica | 2022–23 | Croatian Football League | 13 | 0 | 1 | 0 | — | | — | | 14 | 0 |
| Anorthosis | 2023–24 | Cyta Championship | 28 | 0 | 1 | 0 | — | | — | | 29 | 0 |
| Panserraikos | 2024–25 | Super League Greece | 6 | 0 | 2 | 0 | — | | — | | 8 | 0 |
| Panserraikos | 2025–26 | Super League Greece | 7 | 0 | 0 | 0 | — | | — | | 7 | 0 |
| Panserraikos | Total | | 13 | 0 | 2 | 0 | 0 | 0 | 0 | 0 | 15 | 0 |
| Career total | | | 113 | 3 | 7 | 0 | 7 | 0 | 17 | 0 | 144 | 3 |

=== International ===
As of 13 November 2019

Senegal
| Year | Apps | Goals |
|---|---|---|
| 2017 | 7 | 0 |
| 2018 | 6 | 1 |
| 2019 | 6 | 0 |
| Total | 19 | 1 |

As of match played 24 June 2018. Senegal score listed first, score column indicates score after Wagué's goal.

| # | Date | Venue | Opponent | Score | Result | Competition |
|---|---|---|---|---|---|---|
| 1. | 24 June 2018 | Central Stadium, Yekaterinburg, Russia | Japan | 2–1 | 2–2 | 2018 FIFA World Cup |

== Honours ==
Barcelona

- La Liga: 2018–19

PAOK

- Greek Cup: 2020-21

Senegal U23

- African Games: 2015

Senegal

- Africa Cup of Nations runner-up: 2019
