= 2019 La Liga-Serie A Cup =

2019 International Leagues Cup
La Liga-Serie A Cup
Barcelona	Napoli
(Spain)	(Italy)
6	1
- on aggregate

First leg
Barcelona	Napoli
2	1
- Date: August 7, 2019
- Venue: Hard Rock Stadium, Miami
- Referee: Ted Unkel (United States)
- Attendance: 57,062

Second leg
Napoli	Barcelona
0	4
- Date: August 10, 2019
- Venue: Michigan Stadium, Ann Arbor
- Referee: Rubiel Vazquez (United States)
- Attendance: 60,043

The 2019 La Liga-Serie A Cup was the inaugural edition of a competition between two teams from La Liga and Serie A. Barcelona from La Liga and Napoli from Serie A respectively, were the inaugural participants of this event, and played a two-legged series in the United States with the first leg held on August 7 at Hard Rock Stadium in Miami, Florida and the second leg held on August 10 at Michigan Stadium in Ann Arbor, Michigan.

== Teams ==
Two teams participated in this tournament:

Nation	Team	Home venue for
Italy	Napoli	Second leg
Spain	Barcelona	First leg

== Venues ==
This tournament was hosted by two venues:

United States
Miami	2019 La Liga-Serie A Cup is located in the United States	Ann Arbor
Hard Rock Stadium	2019 La Liga-Serie A Cup is located in the United States	Michigan Stadium
Capacity: 64,767	2019 La Liga-Serie A Cup is located in the United States	Capacity: 107,601

== Format ==
There was no away goals rule since both matches were played at neutral venues; in case of a draw after 90 minutes, a penalty shoot-out would take place.

== Matches ==
=== First leg ===
August 7, 2019
7:00 PM EDT

Barcelona (Spain)	2–1	(Italy) Napoli
Busquets 38'; Rakitić 79'	Report	Umtiti 42' (o.g.)

Hard Rock Stadium, Miami
Attendance: 57,062
Referee: Ted Unkel (United States)

Barcelona	Napoli

=== Second leg ===
August 10, 2019
5:00 PM EDT

Napoli (Italy)	0–4	(Spain) Barcelona
	Report	Suárez 48', 58'; Griezmann 56'; Dembélé 63'

Michigan Stadium, Ann Arbor
Attendance: 60,043
Referee: Rubiel Vazquez (United States)

Napoli	Barcelona

GK	1	(Italy) Alex Meret
DF	23	(Albania) Elseid Hysaj	(substituted off) 62'
DF	44	(Greece) Kostas Manolas
DF	21	(Romania) Vlad Chiricheș	(substituted off) 46'
DF	31	(Algeria) Faouzi Ghoulam
MF	7	(Spain) José Callejón
MF	5	(Brazil) Allan	(substituted off) 46'
MF	8	(Spain) Fabián Ruiz
MF	12	(North Macedonia) Eljif Elmas	(substituted off) 46'
FW	9	(Italy) Simone Verdi
FW	14	(Belgium) Dries Mertens
Substitutes:
DF	13	(Italy) Sebastiano Luperto	(substituted on) 46'
MF	20	(Poland) Piotr Zieliński	(substituted on) 46'
FW	24	(Italy) Lorenzo Insigne	(substituted on) 46'
DF	22	(Italy) Giovanni Di Lorenzo	(substituted on) 62'
Manager:
(Italy) Carlo Ancelotti

GK	1	(Germany) Marc-André ter Stegen
DF	2	(Portugal) Nélson Semedo	(yellow card) 53'	(substituted off) 67'
DF	3	(Spain) Gerard Piqué		(substituted off) 67'
DF	15	(France) Clément Lenglet
DF	18	(Spain) Jordi Alba
MF	20	(Spain) Sergi Roberto
MF	21	(Netherlands) Frenkie de Jong
MF	19	(Spain) Carles Aleñá
MF	11	(France) Ousmane Dembélé		(substituted off) 74'
FW	9	(Uruguay) Luis Suárez		(substituted off) 67'
FW	17	(France) Antoine Griezmann
Substitutes:
MF	22	(Chile) Arturo Vidal		(substituted on) 67'
DF	23	(France) Samuel Umtiti		(substituted on) 67'
MF	12	(Brazil) Rafinha		(substituted on) 67'
FW	29	(Spain) Abel Ruiz		(substituted on) 74'
Manager:
(Spain) Ernesto Valverde
