= Bayern Munich–Real Madrid rivalry =

Football rivalry between FC Bayern Munich and Real Madrid CF

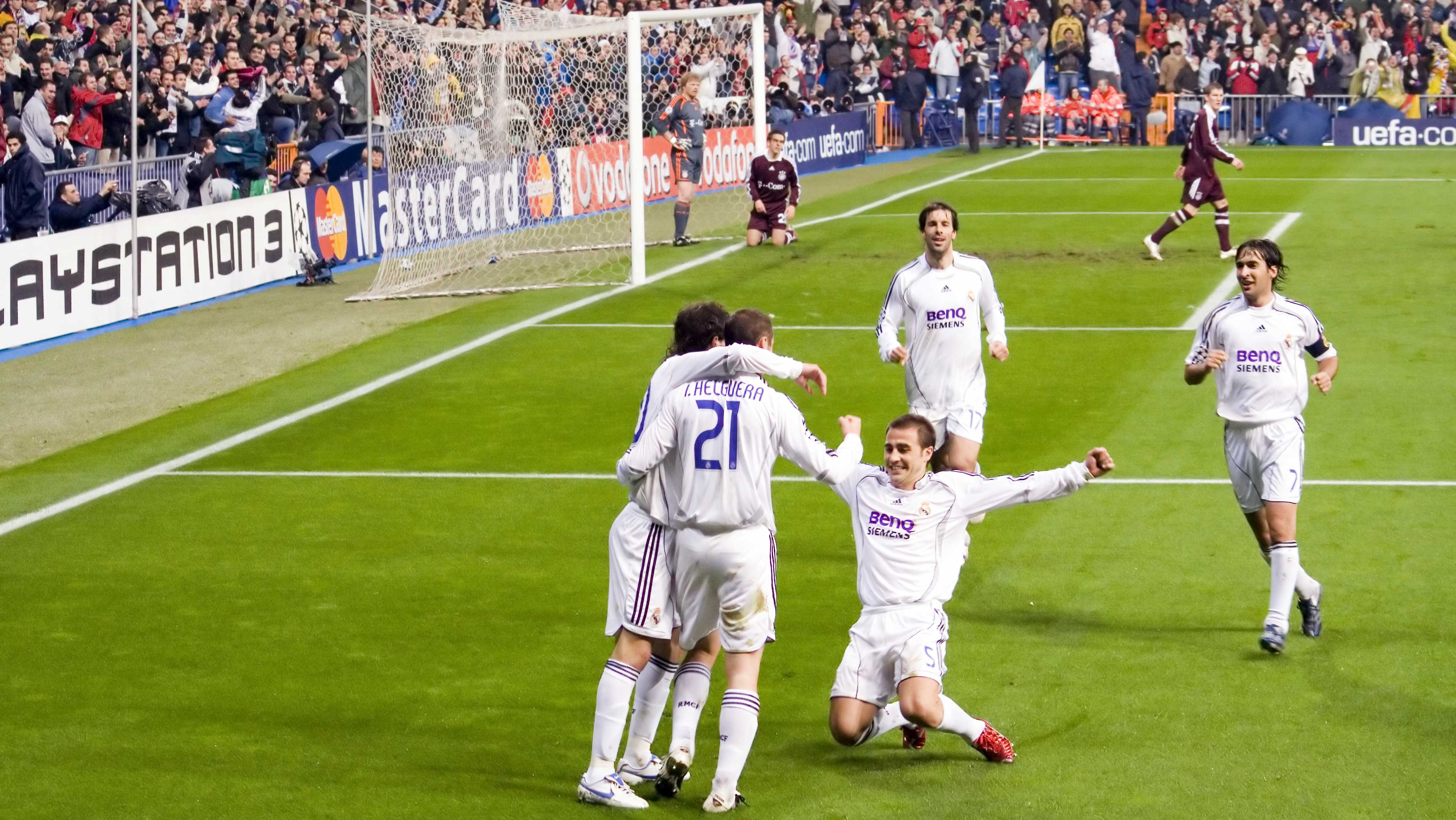
- Real Madrid vs Bayern Munich, 2006–07 UEFA Champions League season
- Other names: European Clásico
- Location: Europe (UEFA)
- Teams: Bayern Munich; Real Madrid
- First meeting: Real Madrid 1–5 Bayern Munich (14 August 1973); Friendly
- Latest meeting: Bayern Munich 4–3 Real Madrid (15 April 2026); 2025–26 UEFA Champions League
- Next meeting: Undecided
- Stadiums: Allianz Arena; Bernabéu

Statistics
- Total meetings: Official matches: 30; Exhibition matches: 10; Total: 40
- Most wins: Official matches: Both clubs (13); Exhibition matches: Bayern Munich (6); Total matches: Bayern Munich (19)
- Most player appearances: (Spain) Iker Casillas (14 matches)
- Top scorer: (Portugal) Cristiano Ronaldo (9 goals)
- Largest victory: Official match: Bayern Munich 0–4 Real Madrid (29 April 2014); UEFA Champions League; Exhibition match: Bayern Munich 9–1 Real Madrid (5 August 1980); Friendly
- Largest goal scoring: Bayern Munich 9–1 Real Madrid (5 August 1980); Friendly
- Longest win streak: Real Madrid (6) (2012–2018)
- Longest unbeaten streak: Real Madrid (9) (2012–2024)

The Bayern Munich–Real Madrid rivalry, commonly known as the European Clásico (German: Europäischer Klassiker; Spanish: Clásico europeo) is a European club rivalry between Bayern Munich and Real Madrid. It is the most often played match in the Champions League/European Cup with 30 matches.

Due to the tie being closely contested, Madrid supporters sometimes referred to Bayern as the "Bestia negra" ("Black Beast"). Despite facing each other the most in the competition's history, with several controversial incidents occurring due to the great importance of most of their meetings, the clubs have never met in the final of a Champions League or European Cup.

== Head-to-head ==
Both the clubs are most successful in their respective countries, Real Madrid winning 71 domestic trophies and Bayern Munich winning 69 domestic trophies.

Bayern Munich have won a total of 14 international trophies, including 6 European Cup/UEFA Champions League, while Real Madrid have 32 international trophies, including a record 15 European Cup/UEFA Champions League titles.

=== Statistics ===
	Played	Bayern Munich wins	Draws	Real Madrid wins	Bayern Munich goals	Real Madrid goals
European Cup/Champions League	30	13	4	13	48	49
Total	30	13	4	13	48	49
Exhibition	10	6	2	2	25	11
Total	10	6	2	2	25	11
Overall Total	40	19	6	15	73	60

=== Honours ===
Bayern Munich	Competition	Real Madrid
European
6	European Cup/UEFA Champions League	15
1	European Cup Winners' Cup/UEFA Cup Winners' Cup (defunct)	—
1	UEFA Cup/UEFA Europa League	2
2	UEFA Super Cup	6
10	Aggregate	23
Worldwide
2	Intercontinental Cup (defunct)	3
2	FIFA Club World Cup	5
0	FIFA Intercontinental Cup	1
4	Aggregate	9
14	Total aggregate	32

== List of matches ==
Although they have never met in a final, Real Madrid versus Bayern is the match that has historically been played most often in the Champions League/European Cup with 30 matches (thirteen wins for Madrid, thirteen wins for Bayern, with four draws). More importantly, they have faced each other in fourteen knockout rounds, including eight semi-finals, more than any other pair.

During the 2010s, the two teams met in the 2011–12 Champions League semi-finals, which ended 3–3 on aggregate (Bayern won 3–1 on penalties after extra time, but lost the final at their own stadium), and then at the same stage in the 2013–14 edition with Real Madrid winning 5–0 on aggregate on their way to winning the competition. They were also drawn together in the 2016–17 quarter-finals; Real Madrid won 6–3 on aggregate after extra time and subsequently lifted the trophy. The following year, they met in the semi-finals, with Real Madrid again progressing 4–3. Until the 2018–19 season, when they were twice defeated in Madrid by three-goal margins, Real's biggest loss at home in the Champions League had been at the hands of Bayern on 29 February 2000, 2–4. While Bayern Munich’s biggest home loss in European competitions remains a 4–0 loss to Real Madrid on 29 April 2014.

=== European Cup/UEFA Champions League ===
#	Season	Round	Date	Home team	Score	Away team	Venue	Attendance	Qualified
1	1975–76	Semi-finals	31 March 1976	Real Madrid	1–1	Bayern Munich	Santiago Bernabéu	111,000	Bayern Munich (1)
2	1975–76	Semi-finals	14 April 1976	Bayern Munich	2–0	Real Madrid	Olympiastadion	78,000	Bayern Munich (1)
3	1986–87	Semi-finals	8 April 1987	Bayern Munich	4–1	Real Madrid	Olympiastadion	75,000	Bayern Munich (2)
4	1986–87	Semi-finals	22 April 1987	Real Madrid	1–0	Bayern Munich	Santiago Bernabéu	100,000	Bayern Munich (2)
5	1987–88	Quarter-finals	2 March 1988	Bayern Munich	3–2	Real Madrid	Olympiastadion	70,000	Real Madrid (1)
6	1987–88	Quarter-finals	16 March 1988	Real Madrid	2–0	Bayern Munich	Santiago Bernabéu	95,000	Real Madrid (1)
7	1999–2000	Second Group stage	29 February 2000	Real Madrid	2–4	Bayern Munich	Santiago Bernabéu	68,000	Group Stage
8	1999–2000	Second Group stage	8 March 2000	Bayern Munich	4–1	Real Madrid	Olympiastadion	60,000	Group Stage
9	1999–2000	Semi-finals	2 May 2000	Real Madrid	2–0	Bayern Munich	Santiago Bernabéu	95,000	Real Madrid (2)
10	1999–2000	Semi-finals	10 May 2000	Bayern Munich	2–1	Real Madrid	Olympiastadion	60,000	Real Madrid (2)
11	2000–01	Semi-finals	1 May 2001	Real Madrid	0–1	Bayern Munich	Santiago Bernabéu	75,000	Bayern Munich (3)
12	2000–01	Semi-finals	9 May 2001	Bayern Munich	2–1	Real Madrid	Olympiastadion	60,000	Bayern Munich (3)
13	2001–02	Quarter-finals	2 April 2002	Bayern Munich	2–1	Real Madrid	Olympiastadion	60,000	Real Madrid (3)
14	2001–02	Quarter-finals	10 April 2002	Real Madrid	2–0	Bayern Munich	Santiago Bernabéu	75,328	Real Madrid (3)
15	2003–04	Round of 16	24 February 2004	Bayern Munich	1–1	Real Madrid	Olympiastadion	59,000	Real Madrid (4)
16	2003–04	Round of 16	10 March 2004	Real Madrid	1–0	Bayern Munich	Santiago Bernabéu	78,000	Real Madrid (4)
17	2006–07	Round of 16	20 February 2007	Real Madrid	3–2	Bayern Munich	Santiago Bernabéu	80,300	Bayern Munich (4)
18	2006–07	Round of 16	7 March 2007	Bayern Munich	2–1	Real Madrid	Allianz Arena	66,000	Bayern Munich (4)
19	2011–12	Semi-finals	17 April 2012	Bayern Munich	2–1	Real Madrid	Allianz Arena	66,000	Bayern Munich (5)
20	2011–12	Semi-finals	25 April 2012	Real Madrid	2–1 (Note: Aggregate score tied at 3–3, Bayern Munich won 3–1 on penalties.)	Bayern Munich	Santiago Bernabéu	71,654	Bayern Munich (5)
21	2013–14	Semi-finals	23 April 2014	Real Madrid	1–0	Bayern Munich	Santiago Bernabéu	79,283	Real Madrid (5)
22	2013–14	Semi-finals	29 April 2014	Bayern Munich	0–4	Real Madrid	Allianz Arena	68,000	Real Madrid (5)
23	2016–17	Quarter-finals	12 April 2017	Bayern Munich	1–2	Real Madrid	Allianz Arena	70,000	Real Madrid (6)
24	2016–17	Quarter-finals	18 April 2017	Real Madrid	4–2	Bayern Munich	Santiago Bernabéu	78,346	Real Madrid (6)
25	2017–18	Semi-finals	25 April 2018	Bayern Munich	1–2	Real Madrid	Allianz Arena	70,000	Real Madrid (7)
26	2017–18	Semi-finals	1 May 2018	Real Madrid	2–2	Bayern Munich	Santiago Bernabéu	77,459	Real Madrid (7)
27	2023–24	Semi-finals	30 April 2024	Bayern Munich	2–2	Real Madrid	Allianz Arena	75,000	Real Madrid (8)
28	2023–24	Semi-finals	8 May 2024	Real Madrid	2–1	Bayern Munich	Santiago Bernabéu	76,579	Real Madrid (8)
29	2025–26	Quarter-finals	7 April 2026	Real Madrid	1–2	Bayern Munich	Santiago Bernabéu	77,106	Bayern Munich (6)
30	2025–26	Quarter-finals	15 April 2026	Bayern Munich	4–3	Real Madrid	Allianz Arena	75,000	Bayern Munich (6)

=== Exhibition matches ===
#	Tournament	Date	Home team	Score	Away team	Venue	Location
1	Athletic 75th Anniversary Trophy	14 August 1973	Real Madrid	1–5	Bayern Munich	San Mames	Bilbao, Spain
2	Santiago Bernabéu Trophy	31 August 1979	Real Madrid	1–2	Bayern Munich	Santiago Bernabéu	Madrid, Spain
3	Friendly	5 August 1980	Bayern Munich	9–1	Real Madrid	Olympiastadion	Munich, West Germany
4	Santiago Bernabéu Trophy	31 August 1980	Real Madrid	1–1 (Note: Bayern Munich won 5–4 on penalties.)	Bayern Munich	Santiago Bernabéu	Madrid, Spain
5	Santiago Bernabéu Trophy	29 August 1985	Real Madrid	4–2	Bayern Munich	Santiago Bernabéu	Madrid, Spain
6	Santiago Bernabéu Trophy	4 August 2002	Real Madrid	1–2	Bayern Munich	Santiago Bernabéu	Madrid, Spain
7	Franz Beckenbauer Cup	13 August 2010	Bayern Munich	0–0 (Note: Real Madrid won 4–2 on penalties.)	Real Madrid	Allianz Arena	Munich, Germany
8	Audi Cup	6 August 2015	Bayern Munich	1–0	Real Madrid	Allianz Arena	Munich, Germany
9	International Champions Cup	4 August 2016	Bayern Munich*	0–1	Real Madrid	MetLife Stadium	(United States) New Jersey, USA
10	International Champions Cup	21 July 2019	Bayern Munich*	3–1	Real Madrid	NRG Stadium	(United States) Houston, Texas, USA

== Statistics ==
=== Top scorers ===
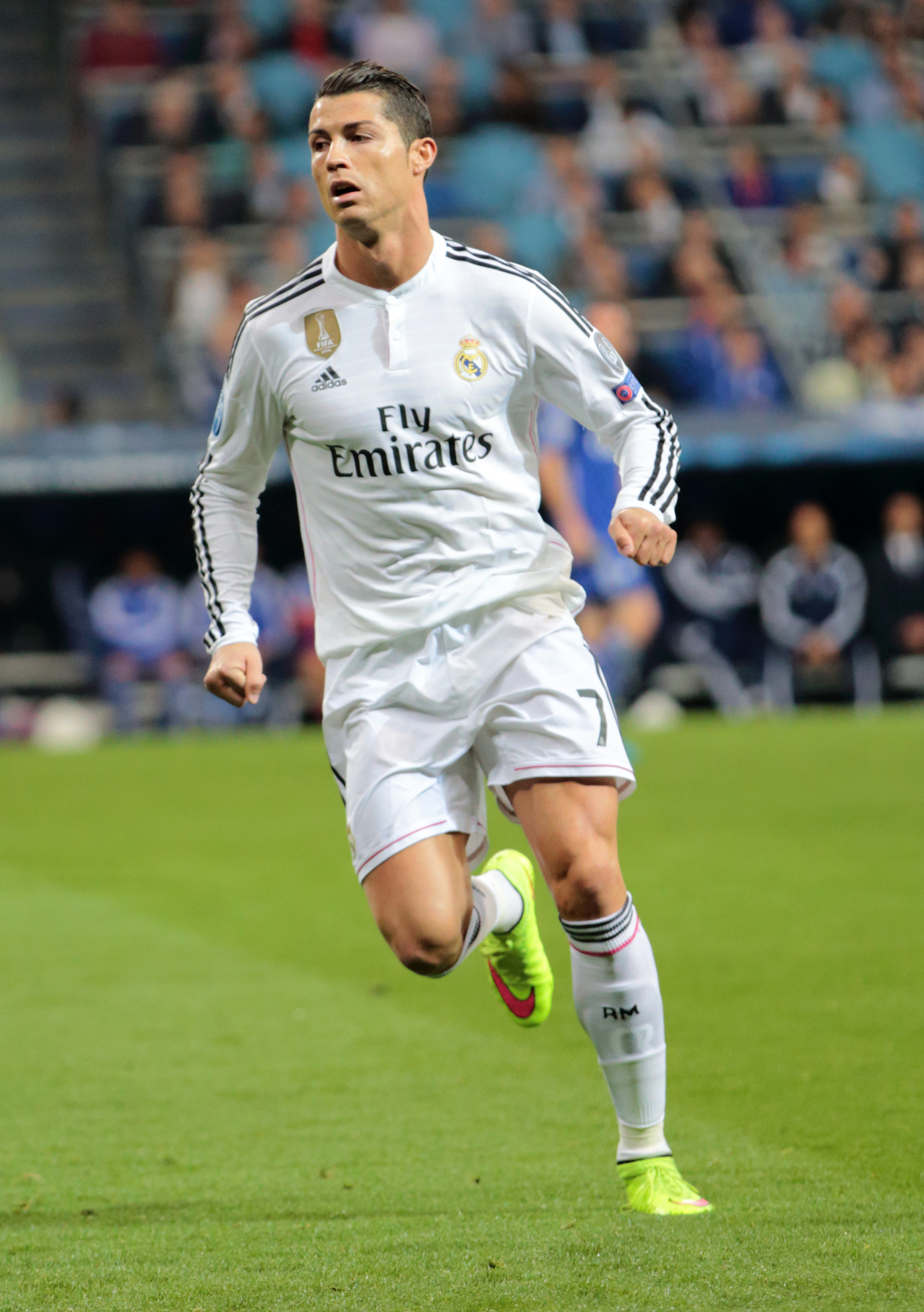
Cristiano Ronaldo has scored the most goals (9) in the history of this fixture and is the only player to score a hat-trick.

Rank	Player	Club	Goals
1	(Portugal) Cristiano Ronaldo	(Spain) Real Madrid	9
2	(Brazil) Giovane Élber	(Germany) Bayern Munich	4
3	(France) Karim Benzema	(Spain) Real Madrid	3
3	(England) Harry Kane	(Germany) Bayern Munich	3
3	(Germany) Gerd Müller	(Germany) Bayern Munich	3
3	(Spain) Raúl	(Spain) Real Madrid	3

=== Hat-tricks ===
Player	For	Against	Result	Date
(Portugal) Cristiano Ronaldo	(Spain) Real Madrid	(Germany) Bayern Munich	4–2 (a.e.t.) (H)	18 April 2017

=== Appearances ===
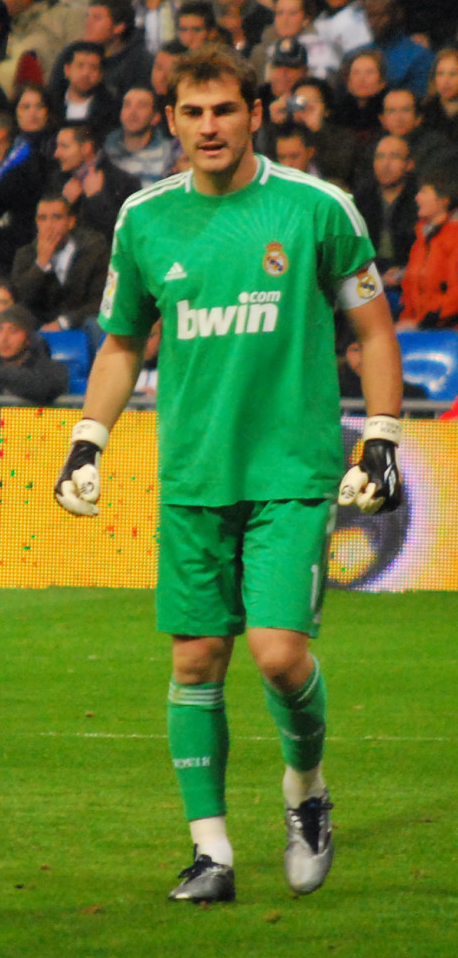
Iker Casillas has most numbers of appearances (14) in the fixture.

Rank	Player	Club	Appearances
1	(Spain) Iker Casillas	(Spain) Real Madrid	14
2	(Spain) Raúl	(Spain) Real Madrid	12
2	(Germany) Oliver Kahn	(Germany) Bayern Munich	12
2	(Bosnia and Herzegovina) Hasan Salihamidžić	(Germany) Bayern Munich	12
5	(Brazil) Roberto Carlos	(Spain) Real Madrid	11
5	(Spain) Iván Helguera	(Spain) Real Madrid	11
7	(France) Bixente Lizarazu	(Germany) Bayern Munich	10
7	(Germany) Thomas Müller	(Germany) Bayern Munich	10
7	(Germany) Toni Kroos	(Germany) Bayern Munich (Spain) Real Madrid	10
7	(Germany) Manuel Neuer	(Germany) Bayern Munich	10

=== Other records ===
- Most assists: 5 – (Brazil) Giovane Élber
- Most clean sheets: 4 – (Spain) Iker Casillas
- Fastest goal: 10.12 seconds – (Netherlands) Roy Makaay, 2006–07 UEFA Champions League, 7 March 2007

== Personnel at both clubs ==
=== Players ===
Player	Years at Bayern Munich	Years at Real Madrid	Apps (goals) for Bayern v Real	Apps (goals) for Real v Bayern
(Germany) Paul Breitner	1970–1974; 1978–1983	1974–1977	–	1 (0)
(Brazil) Zé Roberto	2002–2006; 2007–2009 (on loan)	1997	2 (0)	–
(Netherlands) Arjen Robben	2009–2019	2007–2009	7 (1)	–
(Turkey) Hamit Altıntop	2007–2011	2011–2012	–	–
(Germany) Toni Kroos	2007–2014	2014–2024	4 (0)	6 (0)
(Spain) Xabi Alonso	2014–2017	2009–2014	2 (0)	4 (0)
(Colombia) James Rodríguez	2017–2019 (on loan from Real Madrid)	2014–2020	2 (1)	1 (0)
(Spain) Álvaro Odriozola	2020 (on loan from Real Madrid)	2018–2023	–	–
(Austria) David Alaba	2010–2021	2021–2026	7 (0)	–

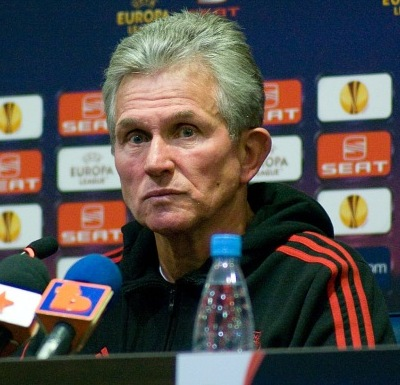
Jupp Heynckes managed and won the Champions League with both clubs.

=== Managers ===
Manager	Years at Bayern Munich	Years at Real Madrid
(Germany) Jupp Heynckes	1987–1991; 2011–2013; 2017–2018	1997–1998
(Italy) Carlo Ancelotti	2016–2017	2013–2015; 2021–2025
