= 2013 Audi Cup =

Tournament details
- Host country: Germany
- Dates: 31 July – 1 August
- Teams: 4 (from 2 confederations)
- Venue(s): 1 (in 1 host city)

Final positions
- Champions: (Germany) Bayern Munich (2nd title)
- Runners-up: (England) Manchester City
- Third place: (Italy) Milan
- Fourth place: (Brazil) São Paulo

Tournament statistics
- Matches played: 4
- Goals scored: 14 (3.5 per match)
- Attendance: 194,500 (48,625 per match)
- Top scorer(s): (Bosnia and Herzegovina) Edin Džeko (Italy) Stephan El Shaarawy (Croatia) Mario Mandžukić (2 goals each)

The 2013 Audi Cup was the third edition of the Audi Cup, a two-day association football tournament that featured four teams, and was played at the Allianz Arena in Munich, Germany. The competition hosted the 2009 Audi Cup winners Bayern Munich, the 2012 Copa Sudamericana champions São Paulo, the 2011–12 Premier League champions Manchester City and perennial Serie A contenders Milan. The English and Brazilian clubs made their first appearances in the competition, while Bayern, as hosts, and Milan have been present in every Audi Cup so far. The winners of the tournament were Bayern Munich, who beat Manchester City 2–1 in the final. Milan defeated São Paulo 1–0 in the third place play-off.

Prior to the semi-final match between Bayern Munich and São Paulo, as the Bayern goalkeepers were warming up, advertising billboards located around the field were showing fan messages published via their Twitter profiles using the hashtag #HelloAudiCup. One of the displayed messages stated, "Ei, Douglas, vai tomar no cu" ("Hey, Douglas, go fuck yourself!"). It was sent by @DarkFabuloso, a fake profile that satirizes São Paulo player Luís Fabiano, and was inadvertently approved by the staff responsible for selecting and displaying the messages.

== Participating teams ==
- Bayern Munich (Germany)
- Manchester City (England)
- Milan (Italy)
- São Paulo (Brazil)

== Competition format ==
The competition took the format of the latter stages of a regular knock-out competition. The winners of each of the two matches on the first day competed against each other for the Audi Cup, whilst the two losing sides playing in a third-place match. The trophy was contested over two days, each day seeing two matches played back-to-back. The official matchups were announced on 19 June 2013.

Semi-finals; 31 July
(England) Manchester City	5
(Italy) Milan	3
(Germany) Bayern Munich	2
(Brazil) São Paulo	0

Final; 1 August
(England) Manchester City	1
(Germany) Bayern Munich	2
Third place
(Italy) Milan	1
(Brazil) São Paulo	0

== Matches ==
All times are local (CEST; UTC+02:00).

=== Semi-finals ===
31 July 2013
18:15

Manchester City (England)	5–3	(Italy) Milan
Silva 3'; Richards 19'; Kolarov 22'; Džeko 32', 36'	Report	El Shaarawy 37', 39'; Petagna 43'

Allianz Arena, Munich
Attendance: 35,000
Referee: Peter Sippel (Germany)

31 July 2013
20:30

Bayern Munich (Germany)	2–0	(Brazil) São Paulo
Mandžukić 55'; Weiser 86'	Report

Allianz Arena, Munich
Attendance: 56,500
Referee: Deniz Aytekin

=== Third place play-off ===
1 August 2013
18:15

Milan (Italy)	1–0	(Brazil) São Paulo
K. Boateng 52'	Report

Allianz Arena, Munich
Attendance: 35,000
Referee: Günter Perl (Germany)

=== Final ===
1 August 2013
20:30

Manchester City (England)	1–2	(Germany) Bayern Munich
Negredo 61'	Report	Müller 66' (pen.); Mandžukić 72'

Allianz Arena, Munich
Attendance: 68,000
Referee: Wolfgang Stark (Germany)

Manchester City	Bayern Munich

== Goalscorers ==
2 goals

- (Croatia) Mario Mandžukić (Bayern Munich)
- (Bosnia and Herzegovina) Edin Džeko (Manchester City)
- (Italy) Stephan El Shaarawy (Milan)

1 goal

- (Germany) Thomas Müller (Bayern Munich)
- (Germany) Mitchell Weiser (Bayern Munich)
- (Serbia) Aleksandar Kolarov (Manchester City)
- (Spain) Álvaro Negredo (Manchester City)
- (England) Micah Richards (Manchester City)
- (Spain) David Silva (Manchester City)
- (Ghana) Kingsley Boateng (Milan)
- (Italy) Andrea Petagna (Milan)
