= 2017–18 SSC Napoli season =

Napoli
2017–18 season
- President: Aurelio De Laurentiis
- Manager: Maurizio Sarri
- Stadium: Stadio San Paolo
- Serie A: 2nd
- Coppa Italia: Quarter-finals
- UEFA Champions League: Group stage
- UEFA Europa League: Round of 32
- Top goalscorer: League: Dries Mertens (18); All: Dries Mertens (22)
- Highest home attendance: 55,567 vs Juventus (1 December 2017, Serie A)
- Lowest home attendance: 10,573 vs Shakhtar Donetsk (21 November 2017, Champions League)
- Average home league attendance: 43,050
Home colours	Away colours	Third colours

The 2017–18 season was Società Sportiva Calcio Napoli's 72nd season in Serie A. The team competed in Serie A, the Coppa Italia, the UEFA Champions League, and the UEFA Europa League.

In the league, Napoli set a new club record for points in a single Serie A season, finishing with 91, though this would only be good enough for 2nd place behind champions Juventus, with 95. Dries Mertens was once again the club's top league goalscorer, albeit with ten fewer goals than the previous season; he scored 18 in Serie A and 22 in all competitions. In the Coppa Italia Napoli were eliminated in the quarter-finals by Atalanta. In the Champions League, Napoli had first to navigate through the play-off round, successfully eliminating French club Nice with 2–0 wins in both legs, 4–0 on aggregate. However, having been drawn into a group with English club Manchester City, Ukrainian club Shakhtar Donetsk, and Dutch club Feyenoord, Napoli finished a disappointing third, with four defeats and only two victories. As a result Napoli dropped down to the round of 32 of the Europa League, once again experiencing European disappointment as they were eliminated on away goals after drawing 3–3 across two legs with German club RB Leipzig.

This was Maurizio Sarri's third and final season in charge of the club after signing from Empoli in the summer of 2015.

== Players ==
=== Squad information ===
Last updated on 20 May 2018
Appearances include league matches only

No.	Name	Nat	Position(s)	Date of birth (age)	Signed from	Signed in	Contract ends	Apps.	Goals
Goalkeepers
1	Rafael	(Brazil)	GK	20 May 1990 (aged 28)	(Brazil) Santos	2013	2018	32	0
22	Luigi Sepe	(Italy)	GK	8 May 1991 (aged 27)	(Italy) Youth Sector	2009	2022	2	0
25	Pepe Reina	(Spain)	GK	31 August 1982 (aged 35)	(Germany) Bayern Munich	2015	2018	111	0
Defenders
6	Mário Rui	(Portugal)	LB	27 May 1991 (aged 27)	(Italy) Roma	2017	2018	25	2
11	Christian Maggio	(Italy)	RB	11 February 1982 (aged 36)	(Italy) Sampdoria	2008	2018	233	20
19	Hrvoje Milić	(Croatia)	LB	10 May 1989 (aged 29)	Unattached	2018	2018	0	0
21	Vlad Chiricheș	(Romania)	CB	14 November 1989 (aged 28)	(England) Tottenham Hotspur	2015	2020	29	3
23	Elseid Hysaj	(Albania)	RB	2 February 1994 (aged 24)	(Italy) Empoli	2015	2021	107	0
26	Kalidou Koulibaly	(Senegal)	CB	20 June 1991 (aged 27)	(Belgium) Genk	2014	2021	123	8
31	Faouzi Ghoulam	(Algeria)	LB	1 February 1991 (aged 27)	(France) Saint-Étienne	2014	2022	110	2
33	Raúl Albiol	(Spain)	CB	4 September 1985 (aged 32)	(Spain) Real Madrid	2013	2020	160	5
62	Lorenzo Tonelli	(Italy)	CB	17 January 1990 (aged 28)	(Italy) Empoli	2016	2020	7	3
Midfielders
5	Allan	(Brazil)	CM	8 January 1991 (aged 27)	(Italy) Udinese	2015	2023	102	8
8	Jorginho	(Italy)	DM	20 December 1991 (aged 26)	(Italy) Hellas Verona	2014	2020	133	2
17	Marek Hamšík	(Slovakia)	CM	27 July 1987 (aged 30)	(Italy) Brescia	2007	2020	395	100
20	Piotr Zieliński	(Poland)	CM / RW / LW	20 May 1994 (aged 24)	(Italy) Udinese	2016	2021	72	9
27	Zinédine Machach	(France)	CM / DM	5 January 1996 (aged 22)	Unattached	2018	2022	0	0
30	Marko Rog	(Croatia)	CM	19 July 1995 (aged 22)	(Croatia) Dinamo Zagreb	2016	2021	43	1
37	Adam Ounas	(Algeria)	RW	11 November 1996 (aged 21)	(France) Bordeaux	2017	2022	7	0
42	Amadou Diawara	(Guinea)	DM	17 July 1997 (aged 20)	(Italy) Bologna	2016	2021	36	1
Forwards
7	José Callejón	(Spain)	RW	11 February 1987 (aged 31)	(Spain) Real Madrid	2013	2020	188	57
14	Dries Mertens	(Belgium)	CF	6 May 1987 (aged 31)	(Netherlands) PSV Eindhoven	2013	2020	170	68
18	Leandrinho	(Brazil)	CF	11 October 1998 (aged 19)	(Brazil) Ponte Preta	2017	2021	0	0
24	Lorenzo Insigne	(Italy)	LW	4 June 1991 (aged 27)	(Italy) Youth Sector	2009	2022	205	48
99	Arkadiusz Milik	(Poland)	ST	28 February 1994 (aged 24)	(Netherlands) Ajax	2016	2021	32	10
Players transferred during the season
15	Emanuele Giaccherini	(Italy)	CM / RM / LM	5 May 1985 (aged 33)	(England) Sunderland	2016	2019	20	1
19	Nikola Maksimović	(Serbia)	CB	25 November 1991 (aged 26)	(Italy) Torino	2016	2021	10	1

== Transfers ==
=== In ===
Date	Pos.	Player	Age	Moving from	Fee	Notes	Source
1 July 2017	MF	(Netherlands) Jonathan de Guzmán	29	(Italy) Chievo	Loan return		
1 July 2017	MF	(Italy) Alberto Grassi	22	(Italy) Atalanta	Loan return		
1 July 2017	FW	(Italy) Roberto Insigne	23	(Italy) Latina	Loan return		
1 July 2017	FW	(Colombia) Duván Zapata	26	(Italy) Udinese	Loan return		
1 July 2017	DF	(Colombia) Juan Camilo Zúñiga	31	(England) Watford	Loan return		
3 July 2017	MF	(Algeria) Adam Ounas	20	(France) Bordeaux	€10M	€10M + €2M in bonuses if Napoli qualify for the Champions League	
31 August 2017	FW	(Italy) Roberto Inglese	25	(Italy) Chievo	€12M	Player will remain on loan with Chievo for 2017–18 season	
11 January 2018	MF	(France) Zinédine Machach	22	Free agent	Free		
23 February 2018	DF	(Croatia) Hrvoje Milić	28	Free agent	Free		

==== Loans in ====
Date	Pos.	Player	Age	Moving from	Fee	Notes	Source
13 July 2017	DF	(Portugal) Mário Rui	26	(Italy) Roma	€3.75M	Loan with an obligation to buy for €5.5M	

=== Out ===
Date	Pos.	Player	Age	Moving to	Fee	Notes	Source
6 July 2017	MF	(Netherlands) Jonathan de Guzmán	29	(Germany) Eintracht Frankfurt	Undisclosed		
30 August 2017	FW	(Italy) Leonardo Pavoletti	28	(Italy) Cagliari	€12M		
31 August 2017	DF	(Croatia) Ivan Strinić	30	(Italy) Sampdoria	€23M	Fee part of Duván Zapata deal	

==== Loans out ====
Date	Pos.	Player	Age	Moving to	Fee	Notes	Source
27 July 2017	MF	(Italy) Alberto Grassi	22	(Italy) SPAL	Loan	Loan with an option to buy	
31 August 2017	FW	(Colombia) Duván Zapata	26	(Italy) Sampdoria	€23M	Fee part of Ivan Strinić deal; loan with an obligation to buy	
26 January 2018	DF	(Serbia) Nikola Maksimović	26	(Russia) Spartak Moscow	Loan		
31 January 2018	MF	(Italy) Emanuele Giaccherini	32	(Italy) Chievo	Loan		

== Pre-season and friendlies ==
12 July 2017 Friendly	Napoli (Italy)	17–0	(Italy) Anaunia	Trento, Italy
	Insigne 3', 31'; Allan 23'; Milik 22', 34', 45'; Maksimović 44'; Mertens 48', 50', 53', 62', 68', 79'; Giaccherini 49', 72'; Rog 51'; Pavoletti 69'	Report		Stadium: Campo Sportivo Dimaro; Attendance: 625

15 July 2017 Friendly	Trento (Italy)	0–7	(Italy) Napoli	Trento, Italy
		Report	Mertens 15'; Giaccherini 36'; Chiricheș 38'; Callejón 44'; Milik 59', 66'; Ounas 60'	Stadium: Campo Sportivo Talamo

18 July 2017 Friendly	Napoli (Italy)	4–1	(Italy) Carpi	Trento, Italy
	Callejón 7'; Milik 81', 86'; Ounas 89'		Malcore 51'	Stadium: Stadio Briamasco

22 July 2017 Friendly	Napoli (Italy)	1–1	(Italy) Chievo	Trento, Italy
	Ounas 59'	Report	Inglese 27'	Stadium: Stadio Briamasco; Referee: Gianluca Aureliano

1 August 2017 2017 Audi Cup	Atlético Madrid (Spain)	2–1	(Italy) Napoli	Munich, Germany
17:45 CEST (UTC+02:00)	Savić (yellow card) 37'; Torres 72'; Vietto 81'; Godín (yellow card) 83' (yellow-red card) 89'	Report	Callejón 56'; Jorginho (yellow card) 59'; Rog (yellow card) 64'; Koulibaly (yellow card) 86'	Stadium: Allianz Arena; Referee: Benjamin Brand (Germany)

2 August 2017 2017 Audi Cup	Bayern Munich (Germany)	0–2	(Italy) Napoli	Munich, Germany
17:45 CEST (UTC+02:00)		Report	Koulibaly 14'; Giaccherini 55'; Jorginho (yellow card) 73'; Mertens (yellow card) 74'; Rog (yellow card) 77'	Stadium: Allianz Arena; Referee: Benjamin Cortus (Germany)

6 August 2017 Friendly	Bournemouth (England)	2–2	(Italy) Napoli	Bournemouth, England
	Afobe 52'; Francis 76'	Report	Mertens 30'; Zieliński 84'	Stadium: Dean Court; Referee: Stuart Attwell (England)

10 August 2017 Friendly	Napoli (Italy)	2–0	(Spain) Espanyol	Naples, Italy
	Mertens 35'; Albiol 55'		Roca (yellow card) 27'; Fuego (yellow card) 74'	Stadium: Stadio San Paolo; Referee: Marco Guida (Italy)

== Competitions ==
=== Serie A ===
==== League table ====
Pos	Team	Pld	W	D	L	GF	GA	GD	Pts	Qualification or relegation
1	Juventus (C)	38	30	5	3	86	24	+62	95	Qualification to Champions League group stage
2	Napoli	38	28	7	3	77	29	+48	91	Qualification to Champions League group stage
3	Roma	38	23	8	7	61	28	+33	77	Qualification to Champions League group stage
4	Internazionale	38	20	12	6	66	30	+36	72	Qualification to Champions League group stage
5	Lazio	38	21	9	8	89	49	+40	71 (Note: Lazio were deducted 1 point by the Italian Football Federation)	Qualification to Europa League group stage (Note: Since the winners of the 2017–18 Coppa Italia, Juventus, qualified for European competition based on league position, the spot awarded to the cup winners (Europa League group stage) was passed to the sixth-placed team and the spot awarded to the sixth-placed team (Europa League second qualifying round) was passed to the seventh-placed team.)

Source: Serie A, Soccerway
Rules for classification: 1) Points; 2) Head-to-head points; 3) Head-to-head goal difference; 4) Goal difference; 5) Goals scored; 6) Draw.
(C) Champions

==== Results summary ====
Overall								Home						Away					
Pld	W	D	L	GF	GA	GD	Pts	W	D	L	GF	GA	GD	W	D	L	GF	GA	GD
38	28	7	3	77	29	+48	91	14	3	2	43	18	+25	14	4	1	34	11	+23

Last updated: 20 May 2018.
Source: Competitive matches

==== Results by round ====
Round	1	2	3	4	5	6	7	8	9	10	11	12	13	14	15	16	17	18	19	20	21	22	23	24	25	26	27	28	29	30	31	32	33	34	35	36	37	38
Ground	A	H	A	H	A	A	H	A	H	A	H	A	H	A	H	H	A	H	A	H	A	H	A	H	H	A	H	A	H	A	H	A	H	A	A	H	A	H
Result	W	W	W	W	W	W	W	W	D	W	W	D	W	W	L	D	W	W	W	W	W	W	W	W	W	W	L	D	W	D	W	D	W	W	L	D	W	W
Position	4	3	2	1	1	1	1	1	1	1	1	1	1	1	2	2	1	1	1	1	1	1	1	1	1	1	1	2	2	2	2	2	2	2	2	2	2	2

Updated to match(es) played on 20 May 2018. Source: Competitive matches
A = Away; H = Home; W = Win; D = Draw; L = Loss

==== Matches ====
19 August 2017 1	Hellas Verona	1–3	Napoli	Verona
20:45 CEST (UTC+02:00)	Heurtaux (yellow card) 74'; Pazzini 83' (pen.); Rômulo (yellow card) 90+1'	Report	Souprayen 32' (o.g.); Milik 39'; Hysaj (yellow card) 52' (red card) 82'; Ghoulam 62'; Giaccherini (yellow card) 90+2'	Stadium: Stadio Marc'Antonio Bentegodi; Attendance: 15,215; Referee: Michael Fabbri

27 August 2017 2	Napoli	3–1	Atalanta	Naples
20:45 CEST (UTC+02:00)	Koulibaly (yellow card) 54'; Zieliński 56'; Mertens 61'; Rog 87'	Report	Cristante 15'; Kurtić (yellow card) 77'; De Roon (yellow card) 90+1'	Stadium: Stadio San Paolo; Attendance: 35,102; Referee: Marco Di Bello

10 September 2017 3	Bologna	0–3	Napoli	Bologna
20:45 CEST (UTC+02:00)	Helander (yellow card) 4'; Pulgar (yellow card) 12'; Destro (yellow card) 19'; Palacio (yellow card) 39'; Verdi (yellow card) 73'	Report	Chiricheș (yellow card) 18'; Callejón 66'; Mertens 83'; Zieliński 88'	Stadium: Stadio Renato Dall'Ara; Attendance: 22,398; Referee: Piero Giacomelli

17 September 2017 4	Napoli	6–0	Benevento	Naples
15:00 CEST (UTC+02:00)	Allan 3'; Insigne 15'; Mertens 27', 65' (pen.), 90' (pen.); Callejón 32'	Report	Letizia (yellow card) 37'	Stadium: Stadio San Paolo; Attendance: 49,137; Referee: Massimiliano Irrati

20 September 2017 5	Lazio	1–4	Napoli	Rome
20:45 CEST (UTC+02:00)	Radu (yellow card) 21'; De Vrij 29'; Lucas (yellow card) 79'	Report	Mertens (yellow card) 25', (goal) 59'; Reina (yellow card) 34'; Koulibaly 54'; Callejón 56'; Jorginho (yellow card) 70', (goal) 90+2' (pen.)	Stadium: Stadio Olimpico; Attendance: 28,000; Referee: Antonio Damato

23 September 2017 6	SPAL	2–3	Napoli	Ferrara
18:00 CEST (UTC+02:00)	Schiattarella 13', (yellow card) 67'; Salamon (yellow card) 39'; Viviani (yellow card) 53', (goal) 78'	Report	Insigne (yellow card) 9', (goal) 14'; Callejón 71'; Ghoulam 83'	Stadium: Stadio Paolo Mazza; Attendance: 12,650; Referee: Maurizio Mariani

1 October 2017 7	Napoli	3–0	Cagliari	Naples
12:30 CEST (UTC+02:00)	Hamšík 4'; Mertens 40' (pen.); Koulibaly 47'	Report		Stadium: Stadio San Paolo; Attendance: 42,813; Referee: Rosario Abisso

14 October 2017 8	Roma	0–1	Napoli	Rome
20:45 CEST (UTC+02:00)	De Rossi (yellow card) 53'; Fazio (yellow card) 79'	Report	Insigne 20'; Jorginho (yellow card) 43'; Ghoulam (yellow card) 90'	Stadium: Stadio Olimpico; Attendance: 37,914; Referee: Gianluca Rocchi

21 October 2017 9	Napoli	0–0	Internazionale	Naples
20:45 CEST (UTC+02:00)	Koulibaly (yellow card) 90+2'	Report	Miranda (yellow card) 66'	Stadium: Stadio San Paolo; Attendance: 49,762; Referee: Luca Banti

25 October 2017 10	Genoa	2–3	Napoli	Genoa
20:45 CEST (UTC+02:00)	Taarabt 4'; Zukanović (yellow card) 74'; Izzo 76'	Report	Mertens 14', 30'; Zukanović 60' (o.g.); Rog (yellow card) 86'	Stadium: Stadio Luigi Ferraris; Attendance: 23,367; Referee: Paolo Mazzoleni

29 October 2017 11	Napoli	3–1	Sassuolo	Naples
15:00 CET (UTC+01:00)	Allan 22'; Callejón 44'; Mertens 54'; Zieliński (yellow card) 79'; Giaccherini (yellow card) 88'	Report	Ragusa (yellow card) 18'; Falcinelli 41'; Cassata (yellow card) 43'	Stadium: Stadio San Paolo; Attendance: 53,609; Referee: Luca Pairetto

5 November 2017 12	Chievo	0–0	Napoli	Verona
15:00 CET (UTC+01:00)	Radovanović (yellow card) 34'	Report	Mário Rui (yellow card) 34'; Zieliński (yellow card) 53'; Koulibaly (yellow card) 81'	Stadium: Stadio Marc'Antonio Bentegodi; Attendance: 12,000; Referee: Davide Massa

18 November 2017 13	Napoli	2–1	Milan	Naples
20:45 CET (UTC+01:00)	Insigne 33'; Zieliński 73'; Allan (yellow card) 90+4'; Albiol (yellow card) 90+5'	Report	Borini (yellow card) 5'; Romagnoli 90+1'	Stadium: Stadio San Paolo; Attendance: 36,557; Referee: Daniele Doveri

26 November 2017 14	Udinese	0–1	Napoli	Udine
15:00 CET (UTC+01:00)	Danilo (yellow card) 21'; Perica (yellow card) 45+1'; Ali Adnan (yellow card) 65'; De Paul (yellow card) 72'; Widmer (yellow card) 89'	Report	Jorginho (yellow card) 27', (goal) 33'	Stadium: Dacia Arena; Attendance: 19,743; Referee: Marco Di Bello

1 December 2017 15	Napoli	0–1	Juventus	Naples
20:45 CET (UTC+01:00)	Mertens (yellow card) 45+1'; Mário Rui (yellow card) 59'	Report	Higuaín 13'; Chiellini (yellow card) 23'	Stadium: Stadio San Paolo; Attendance: 55,567; Referee: Daniele Orsato

10 December 2017 16	Napoli	0–0	Fiorentina	Naples
15:00 CET (UTC+01:00)	Diawara (yellow card) 86'; Callejón (yellow card) 90'; Rog (yellow card) 90+3'	Report	Badelj (yellow card) 36'; Veretout (yellow card) 51'; Gaspar (yellow card) 88'	Stadium: Stadio San Paolo; Attendance: 44,417; Referee: Michael Fabbri

16 December 2017 17	Torino	1–3	Napoli	Turin
18:00 CET (UTC+01:00)	Baselli (yellow card) 37'; Belotti 63'	Report	Koulibaly 4'; Zieliński 25'; Hamšík 30'; Albiol (yellow card) 76'	Stadium: Stadio Olimpico Grande Torino; Attendance: 18,449; Referee: Paolo Mazzoleni

23 December 2017 18	Napoli	3–2	Sampdoria	Naples
15:00 CET (UTC+01:00)	Allan 16'; Mertens (yellow card) 21'; Hysaj (yellow card) 26'; Insigne 33'; Hamšík 39'; Mário Rui (yellow card) 52' (yellow-red card) 77'	Report	Ramírez 2', (yellow card) 82'; Strinić (yellow card) 18'; Quagliarella 27' (pen.); Viviano (yellow card) 57'; Torreira (yellow card) 62'; Verre (yellow card) 72'	Stadium: Stadio San Paolo; Attendance: 48,434; Referee: Davide Massa

29 December 2017 19	Crotone	0–1	Napoli	Crotone
20:45 CET (UTC+01:00)	Ceccherini (yellow card) 39'	Report	Hamšík 17'; Jorginho (yellow card) 30'; Albiol (yellow card) 51'	Stadium: Stadio Ezio Scida; Attendance: 11,063; Referee: Maurizio Mariani

6 January 2018 20	Napoli	2–0	Hellas Verona	Naples
15:00 CET (UTC+01:00)	Koulibaly 65'; Callejón 78'	Report	Bessa (yellow card) 34'; Rômulo (yellow card) 47'; Cáceres (yellow card) 67'; Ferrari (yellow card) 83'	Stadium: Stadio San Paolo; Attendance: 39,580; Referee: Rosario Abisso

21 January 2018 21	Atalanta	0–1	Napoli	Bergamo
12:30 CET (UTC+01:00)		Report	Mário Rui (yellow card) 24'; Mertens 65'; Callejón (yellow card) 88'	Stadium: Stadio Atleti Azzurri d'Italia; Attendance: 19,098; Referee: Daniele Orsato

28 January 2018 22	Napoli	3–1	Bologna	Naples
15:00 CET (UTC+01:00)	Mbaye 5' (o.g.); Mertens 37' (pen.), 59'; Mário Rui (yellow card) 88'	Report	Palacio 1'; Masina (yellow card) 37'; De Maio (yellow card) 77'	Stadium: Stadio San Paolo; Attendance: 37,227; Referee: Paolo Mazzoleni

4 February 2018 23	Benevento	0–2	Napoli	Benevento
20:45 CET (UTC+01:00)	Djimsiti (yellow card) 73'	Report	Mertens 20'; Hamšík 47'	Stadium: Stadio Ciro Vigorito; Attendance: 15,026; Referee: Marco Di Bello

10 February 2018 24	Napoli	4–1	Lazio	Naples
20:45 CET (UTC+01:00)	Callejón 43'; Wallace 54' (o.g.); Mário Rui 56'; Mertens 73'	Report	De Vrij 3', (yellow card) 63'; Lucas (yellow card) 43'; Milinković-Savić (yellow card) 45'	Stadium: Stadio San Paolo; Attendance: 32,940; Referee: Luca Banti

18 February 2018 25	Napoli	1–0	SPAL	Naples
15:00 CET (UTC+01:00)	Allan 6'; Hamšík (yellow card) 62'	Report	Kurtić (yellow card) 40'; Felipe (yellow card) 77'; Costa (yellow card) 83'; Salamon (yellow card) 84'	Stadium: Stadio San Paolo; Attendance: 34,270; Referee: Claudio Gavillucci

26 February 2018 26	Cagliari	0–5	Napoli	Cagliari
20:45 CET (UTC+01:00)	Barella (yellow card) 35'; Castán (yellow card) 71'	Report	Callejón 29'; Koulibaly (yellow card) 31'; Mertens 42'; Hamšík 61'; Insigne 72' (pen.); Mário Rui 90'	Stadium: Sardegna Arena; Attendance: 13,757; Referee: Piero Giacomelli

3 March 2018 27	Napoli	2–4	Roma	Naples
20:45 CET (UTC+01:00)	Insigne 6'; Mertens (yellow card) 55', (goal) 90+2'	Report	Ünder 7'; Džeko 26', 73', (yellow card) 86'; Fazio (yellow card) 55'; Perotti 79'	Stadium: Stadio San Paolo; Attendance: 39,310; Referee: Davide Massa

11 March 2018 28	Internazionale	0–0	Napoli	Milan
20:45 CET (UTC+01:00)	Gagliardini (yellow card) 38'	Report	Allan (yellow card) 17'; Insigne (yellow card) 61'; Albiol (yellow card) 85'	Stadium: San Siro; Attendance: 59,380; Referee: Daniele Orsato

18 March 2018 29	Napoli	1–0	Genoa	Naples
20:45 CET (UTC+01:00)	Albiol 72'; Zieliński (yellow card) 75'	Report	Laxalt (yellow card) 47'; Rosi (yellow card) 76'	Stadium: Stadio San Paolo; Attendance: 30,059; Referee: Fabrizio Pasqua

31 March 2018 30	Sassuolo	1–1	Napoli	Reggio Emilia
15:00 CEST (UTC+02:00)	Politano 22'; Peluso (yellow card) 35'; Berardi (yellow card) 44'; Goldaniga (yellow card) 59'; Cassata (yellow card) 86'; Ragusa (yellow card) 89'	Report	Albiol (yellow card) 31'; Jorginho (yellow card) 42'; Callejón 80'	Stadium: Mapei Stadium – Città del Tricolore; Attendance: 16,904; Referee: Michael Fabbri

8 April 2018 31	Napoli	2–1	Chievo	Naples
15:00 CEST (UTC+02:00)	Mário Rui (yellow card) 54'; Milik 89'; Insigne (yellow card) 90'; Diawara 90+3'	Report	Depaoli (yellow card) 12'; Giaccherini (yellow card) 55'; Stępiński 73'; Inglese (yellow card) 77'	Stadium: Stadio San Paolo; Attendance: 46,601; Referee: Gianluca Manganiello

15 April 2018 32	Milan	0–0	Napoli	Milan
15:00 CEST (UTC+02:00)	Zapata (yellow card) 55'; Çalhanoğlu (yellow card) 90+1'	Report	Hysaj (yellow card) 64'; Koulibaly (yellow card) 90'	Stadium: San Siro; Attendance: 65,786; Referee: Luca Banti

18 April 2018 33	Napoli	4–2	Udinese	Naples
20:45 CEST (UTC+02:00)	Insigne 45+2'; Albiol 64'; Milik 70'; Tonelli 75'; Mário Rui (yellow card) 90+1'	Report	Danilo (yellow card) 35'; Jankto 41'; Ingelsson 55'; Ali Adnan (yellow card) 90+1'	Stadium: Stadio San Paolo; Attendance: 44,118; Referee: Gianpaolo Calvarese

22 April 2018 34	Juventus	0–1	Napoli	Turin
20:45 CEST (UTC+02:00)	Benatia (yellow card) 9'; Asamoah (yellow card) 10'; Pjanić (yellow card) 27'	Report	Albiol (yellow card) 16'; Koulibaly 90'	Stadium: Allianz Stadium; Attendance: 40,114; Referee: Gianluca Rocchi

29 April 2018 35	Fiorentina	3–0	Napoli	Florence
18:00 CEST (UTC+02:00)	Laurini (yellow card) 24'; Simeone 34', 62', 90+3'; Badelj (yellow card) 45+1'; Eysseric (yellow card) 78'	Report	Koulibaly (red card) 8'; Albiol (yellow card) 33'; Callejón (yellow card) 37'; Milik (yellow card) 60'; Insigne (yellow card) 76'; Mário Rui (yellow card) 79'	Stadium: Stadio Artemio Franchi; Attendance: 26,206; Referee: Paolo Mazzoleni

6 May 2018 36	Napoli	2–2	Torino	Naples
15:00 CEST (UTC+02:00)	Mertens 25'; Mário Rui (yellow card) 65'; Hamšík 71'	Report	Burdisso (yellow card) 21'; Baselli (yellow card) 52', (goal) 55'; Belotti (yellow card) 74'; De Silvestri 83'; Nkoulou (yellow card) 90'	Stadium: Stadio San Paolo; Attendance: 47,057; Referee: Daniele Doveri

13 May 2018 37	Sampdoria	0–2	Napoli	Genoa
20:45 CEST (UTC+02:00)	Ramírez (yellow card) 86'; Linetty (yellow card) 90'	Report	Milik 72', (yellow card) 73'; Albiol 80'; Hamšík (yellow card) 86'	Stadium: Stadio Luigi Ferraris; Attendance: 19,250; Referee: Claudio Gavillucci

20 May 2018 38	Napoli	2–1	Crotone	Naples
18:00 CEST (UTC+02:00)	Milik 23'; Callejón 32'	Report	Tumminello 90'	Stadium: Stadio San Paolo; Attendance: 51,382; Referee: Luca Banti

=== Coppa Italia ===
19 December 2017 Round of 16	Napoli	1–0	Udinese	Naples
21:00 CET (UTC+01:00)	Insigne 71'	Report		Stadium: Stadio San Paolo; Attendance: 15,096; Referee: Fabrizio Pasqua

2 January 2018 Quarter-finals	Napoli	1–2	Atalanta	Naples
20:45 CET (UTC+01:00)	Koulibaly (yellow card) 21'; Rog (yellow card) 27'; Mertens 84'	Report	Freuler (yellow card) 19'; Caldara (yellow card) 41'; Toloi (yellow card) 44'; Castagne 50'; Gómez 81'	Stadium: Stadio San Paolo; Attendance: 27,174; Referee: Piero Giacomelli

=== UEFA Champions League ===
==== Play-off round ====
16 August 2017 First leg	Napoli (Italy)	2–0	(France) Nice	Naples, Italy
20:45 CEST (UTC+02:00)	Mertens 13'; Insigne (yellow card) 63'; Jorginho 70' (pen.)	Report	Pléa (yellow card) 65' (yellow-red card) 80'; Koziello (red card) 80'	Stadium: Stadio San Paolo; Attendance: 49,324; Referee: Szymon Marciniak (Poland)

22 August 2017 Second leg	Nice (France)	0–2 (0–4 agg.)	(Italy) Napoli	Nice, France
20:45 CEST (UTC+02:00)	Seri (yellow card) 8'; Lees-Melou (yellow card) 82'	Report	Callejón 48'; Koulibaly (yellow card) 84'; Insigne 89'	Stadium: Allianz Riviera; Attendance: 32,103; Referee: Damir Skomina (Slovenia)

==== Group stage ====
Pos	Team	Pld	W	D	L	GF	GA	GD	Pts	Qualification	MCI	SHK	NAP	FEY
1	(England) Manchester City	6	5	0	1	14	5	+9	15	Advance to knockout phase	—	2–0	2–1	1–0
2	(Ukraine) Shakhtar Donetsk	6	4	0	2	9	9	0	12	Advance to knockout phase	2–1	—	2–1	3–1
3	(Italy) Napoli	6	2	0	4	11	11	0	6	Transfer to Europa League	2–4	3–0	—	3–1
4	(Netherlands) Feyenoord	6	1	0	5	5	14	−9	3		0–4	1–2	2–1	—

Source: UEFA
Rules for classification: Group stage tiebreakers

13 September 2017 1	Shakhtar Donetsk (Ukraine)	2–1	(Italy) Napoli	Kharkiv, Ukraine
20:45 CEST (UTC+02:00)	Taison 15'; Ferreyra 58'; Fred (yellow card) 68'; Stepanenko (yellow card) 71'	Report	Insigne (yellow card) 68'; Mertens (yellow card) 69'; Milik 72' (pen.); Koulibaly (yellow card) 82'	Stadium: Metalist Stadium; Attendance: 32,679; Referee: Felix Zwayer (Germany)

26 September 2017 2	Napoli (Italy)	3–1	(Netherlands) Feyenoord	Naples, Italy
20:45 CEST (UTC+02:00)	Insigne 7'; Koulibaly (yellow card) 37'; Mertens 49'; Callejón 70'; Diawara (yellow card) 90+1'	Report	El Ahmadi (yellow card) 47'; Berghuis (yellow card) 54'; Van Beek (yellow card) 86'; Amrabat 90+3'	Stadium: Stadio San Paolo; Attendance: 22,577; Referee: Willie Collum (Scotland)

17 October 2017 3	Manchester City (England)	2–1	(Italy) Napoli	Manchester, England
20:45 CEST (UTC+02:00)	Sterling 9'; Gabriel Jesus 13'; Walker (yellow card) 37'; De Bruyne (yellow card) 44'; Fernandinho (yellow card) 72'	Report	Diawara 73' (pen.); Albiol (yellow card) 74'; Maggio (yellow card) 79'	Stadium: City of Manchester Stadium; Attendance: 48,520; Referee: Antonio Mateu Lahoz (Spain)

1 November 2017 4	Napoli (Italy)	2–4	(England) Manchester City	Naples, Italy
20:45 CET (UTC+01:00)	Insigne 21'; Jorginho 62' (pen.); Mertens (yellow card) 90+4'; Koulibaly (yellow card) 90+4'	Report	Otamendi 34', (yellow card) 90+1'; Stones 48'; Agüero 69'; Sterling 90+2'	Stadium: Stadio San Paolo; Attendance: 44,483; Referee: Felix Brych (Germany)

21 November 2017 5	Napoli (Italy)	3–0	(Ukraine) Shakhtar Donetsk	Naples, Italy
20:45 CET (UTC+01:00)	Maggio (yellow card) 25'; Insigne 56'; Chiricheș (yellow card) 77'; Zieliński 81'; Mertens 83'; Reina (yellow card) 85'	Report	Ismaily (yellow card) 78'; Ferreyra (yellow card) 85'	Stadium: Stadio San Paolo; Attendance: 10,573; Referee: Damir Skomina (Slovenia)

6 December 2017 6	Feyenoord (Netherlands)	2–1	(Italy) Napoli	Rotterdam, Netherlands
20:45 CET (UTC+01:00)	Vilhena (yellow card) 28' (yellow-red card) 83'; Jørgensen 33'; St. Juste (yellow card) 81', (goal) 90+1'	Report	Zieliński 2'; Mertens (yellow card) 79'	Stadium: De Kuip; Attendance: 36,500; Referee: Michael Oliver (England)

=== UEFA Europa League ===
==== Knockout phase ====
===== Round of 32 =====
15 February 2018 First leg	Napoli (Italy)	1–3	(Germany) RB Leipzig	Naples, Italy
21:05 CET (UTC+01:00)	Ounas 52'; Koulibaly (yellow card) 79'; Mário Rui (yellow card) 88'	Report	Werner 61', 90+3'; Bruma 74'	Stadium: Stadio San Paolo; Attendance: 14,554; Referee: Artur Soares Dias (Portugal)

22 February 2018 Second leg	RB Leipzig (Germany)	0–2 (3a–3 agg.)	(Italy) Napoli	Leipzig, Germany
19:00 CET (UTC+01:00)	Poulsen (yellow card) 30'; Kampl (yellow card) 70'; Sabitzer (yellow card) 75'; Augustin (yellow card) 90+2'	Report	Tonelli (yellow card) 22'; Zieliński 33', (yellow card) 66'; Insigne 86'	Stadium: RB Arena; Attendance: 36,163; Referee: Anthony Taylor (England)

== Statistics ==
=== Appearances and goals ===
No.	Pos	Nat	Player	Total		Serie A		Coppa Italia		Champions League		Europa League	
No.	Pos	Nat	Player	Apps	Goals	Apps	Goals	Apps	Goals	Apps	Goals	Apps	Goals
Goalkeepers
1	GK	(Brazil) BRA	Rafael	0	0	0	0	0	0	0	0	0	0
22	GK	(Italy) ITA	Luigi Sepe	3	0	1	0	2	0	0	0	0	0
25	GK	(Spain) ESP	Pepe Reina	47	0	37	0	0	0	8	0	2	0
Defenders
6	DF	(Portugal) POR	Mário Rui	30	2	24+1	2	1	0	0+2	0	1+1	0
11	DF	(Italy) ITA	Christian Maggio	20	0	6+7	0	1	0	2+2	0	2	0
21	DF	(Romania) ROU	Vlad Chiricheș	9	0	7	0	1	0	1	0	0	0
23	DF	(Albania) ALB	Elseid Hysaj	47	0	35	0	2	0	8	0	1+1	0
26	DF	(Senegal) SEN	Kalidou Koulibaly	45	5	35	5	2	0	7	0	1	0
31	DF	(Algeria) ALG	Faouzi Ghoulam	17	2	11	2	0	0	6	0	0	0
33	DF	(Spain) ESP	Raúl Albiol	39	3	30+1	3	0	0	7	0	1	0
62	DF	(Italy) ITA	Lorenzo Tonelli	6	1	3+1	1	0	0	0	0	2	0
Midfielders
5	MF	(Brazil) BRA	Allan	50	4	32+6	4	0+2	0	5+3	0	1+1	0
8	MF	(Italy) ITA	Jorginho	39	4	33	2	1	0	4	2	0+1	0
17	MF	(Slovakia) SVK	Marek Hamšík	49	7	32+6	7	1	0	8	0	2	0
20	MF	(Poland) POL	Piotr Zieliński	47	7	14+22	4	2	0	4+3	2	2	1
30	MF	(Croatia) CRO	Marko Rog	37	1	0+28	1	2	0	0+6	0	1	0
37	MF	(Algeria) ALG	Adam Ounas	13	1	0+7	0	2	0	0+3	0	1	1
42	MF	(Guinea) GUI	Amadou Diawara	27	2	5+13	1	1	0	4+2	1	2	0
Forwards
7	FW	(Spain) ESP	José Callejón	50	12	38	10	2	0	8	2	1+1	0
14	FW	(Belgium) BEL	Dries Mertens	49	22	35+3	18	0+2	1	7+1	3	1	0
18	FW	(Brazil) BRA	Leandrinho	0	0	0	0	0	0	0	0	0	0
24	FW	(Italy) ITA	Lorenzo Insigne	48	14	36+1	8	0+2	1	7	4	1+1	1
99	FW	(Poland) POL	Arkadiusz Milik	17	6	3+12	5	0	0	1+1	1	0	0
Players transferred out during the season
15	MF	(Italy) ITA	Emanuele Giaccherini	5	0	0+4	0	1	0	0	0	0	0
19	DF	(Serbia) SRB	Nikola Maksimović	4	0	1+1	0	1	0	1	0	0	0

Last updated: 20 May 2018
Source: Competitions

=== Goalscorers ===
Rank	No.	Pos	Nat	Name	Serie A	Coppa Italia	UEFA CL	UEFA EL	Total
1	14	FW	(Belgium)	Dries Mertens	18	1	3	0	22
2	24	FW	(Italy)	Lorenzo Insigne	8	1	4	1	14
3	7	FW	(Spain)	José Callejón	10	0	2	0	12
4	17	MF	(Slovakia)	Marek Hamšík	7	0	0	0	7
4	20	MF	(Poland)	Piotr Zieliński	4	0	2	1	7
6	99	FW	(Poland)	Arkadiusz Milik	5	0	1	0	6
7	26	DF	(Senegal)	Kalidou Koulibaly	5	0	0	0	5
8	5	MF	(Brazil)	Allan	4	0	0	0	4
8	8	MF	(Italy)	Jorginho	2	0	2	0	4
10	33	DF	(Spain)	Raúl Albiol	3	0	0	0	3
11	6	DF	(Portugal)	Mário Rui	2	0	0	0	2
11	31	DF	(Algeria)	Faouzi Ghoulam	2	0	0	0	2
11	42	MF	(Guinea)	Amadou Diawara	1	0	1	0	2
14	30	MF	(Croatia)	Marko Rog	1	0	0	0	1
14	37	MF	(Algeria)	Adam Ounas	0	0	0	1	1
14	62	DF	(Italy)	Lorenzo Tonelli	1	0	0	0	1
Own goals					4	0	0	0	4
Totals					77	2	15	3	97

=== Clean sheets ===
Rank	No.	Pos	Nat	Name	Serie A	Coppa Italia	UEFA CL	UEFA EL	Total
1	25	GK	(Spain)	Pepe Reina	18	0	3	1	22
2	22	GK	(Italy)	Luigi Sepe	1	1	0	0	2
Totals					19	1	3	1	24

Last updated: 20 May 2018

=== Disciplinary record ===
No.	Pos	Nat	Name	Serie A			Coppa Italia			UEFA CL			UEFA EL			Total		
No.	Pos	Nat	Name	Booked	(yellow card) (yellow-red card)	Sent off (straight red)	Booked	(yellow card) (yellow-red card)	Sent off (straight red)	Booked	(yellow card) (yellow-red card)	Sent off (straight red)	Booked	(yellow card) (yellow-red card)	Sent off (straight red)	Booked	(yellow card) (yellow-red card)	Sent off (straight red)
25	GK	(Spain)	Pepe Reina	1	0	0	0	0	0	1	0	0	0	0	0	2	0	0
6	DF	(Portugal)	Mário Rui	8	1	0	0	0	0	0	0	0	1	0	0	9	1	0
11	DF	(Italy)	Christian Maggio	0	0	0	0	0	0	2	0	0	0	0	0	2	0	0
21	DF	(Romania)	Vlad Chiricheș	1	0	0	0	0	0	1	0	0	0	0	0	2	0	0
23	DF	(Albania)	Elseid Hysaj	3	0	1	0	0	0	0	0	0	0	0	0	3	0	1
26	DF	(Senegal)	Kalidou Koulibaly	5	0	1	1	0	0	4	0	0	1	0	0	11	0	1
31	DF	(Algeria)	Faouzi Ghoulam	1	0	0	0	0	0	0	0	0	0	0	0	1	0	0
33	DF	(Spain)	Raúl Albiol	7	0	0	0	0	0	1	0	0	0	0	0	8	0	0
62	DF	(Italy)	Lorenzo Tonelli	0	0	0	0	0	0	0	0	0	1	0	0	1	0	0
5	MF	(Brazil)	Allan	2	0	0	0	0	0	0	0	0	0	0	0	2	0	0
8	MF	(Italy)	Jorginho	5	0	0	0	0	0	0	0	0	0	0	0	5	0	0
15	MF	(Italy)	Emanuele Giaccherini	2	0	0	0	0	0	0	0	0	0	0	0	2	0	0
17	MF	(Slovakia)	Marek Hamšík	2	0	0	0	0	0	0	0	0	0	0	0	2	0	0
20	MF	(Poland)	Piotr Zieliński	3	0	0	0	0	0	0	0	0	1	0	0	4	0	0
30	MF	(Croatia)	Marko Rog	2	0	0	1	0	0	0	0	0	0	0	0	3	0	0
42	MF	(Guinea)	Amadou Diawara	1	0	0	0	0	0	1	0	0	0	0	0	2	0	0
7	FW	(Spain)	José Callejón	3	0	0	0	0	0	0	0	0	0	0	0	3	0	0
14	FW	(Belgium)	Dries Mertens	4	0	0	0	0	0	3	0	0	0	0	0	7	0	0
24	FW	(Italy)	Lorenzo Insigne	4	0	0	0	0	0	2	0	0	0	0	0	6	0	0
99	FW	(Poland)	Arkadiusz Milik	2	0	0	0	0	0	0	0	0	0	0	0	2	0	0
Totals				56	1	2	2	0	0	15	0	0	4	0	0	77	1	2

Last updated: 18 April 2018
