= 2015–16 Tottenham Hotspur F.C. season =

English football club season

Tottenham Hotspur
2015–16 season
- Owner: ENIC International Ltd.
- Chairman: Daniel Levy
- Manager: Mauricio Pochettino
- Stadium: White Hart Lane
- Premier League: 3rd
- FA Cup: Fifth round
- League Cup: Third round
- UEFA Europa League: Round of 16
- Top goalscorer: League: Harry Kane (25); All: Harry Kane (28)
- Highest home attendance: 36,084 (vs Bournemouth) (20 March 2016)
- Lowest home attendance: 26,463 (vs Qarabağ) (17 September 2015)
- Average home league attendance: 34,947
Home colours	Away colours	Third colours

The 2015–16 season was Tottenham Hotspur's 24th season in the Premier League and 38th successive season in the top division of the English football league system. Along with the Premier League, the club competed in the FA Cup, League Cup and the Europa League. The season covers the period from 1 July 2015 to 30 June 2016.

== First-team squad ==
Squad no.	Name	Nationality	Position(s)	Date of birth (age)
Goalkeepers
1	Hugo Lloris (C)	(France)	GK	26 December 1986 (aged 29)
13	Michel Vorm	(Netherlands)	GK	20 October 1983 (aged 32)
31	Luke McGee U^{21}	(England)	GK	2 September 1995 (aged 20)
Defenders
2	Kyle Walker HG^{1}	(England)	RB / RWB	28 May 1990 (aged 25)
3	Danny Rose HG^{2}	(England)	LB / LWB	2 July 1990 (aged 25)
4	Toby Alderweireld	(Belgium)	CB / RB	2 March 1989 (aged 27)
5	Jan Vertonghen (1st VC)	(Belgium)	CB / LB	24 April 1987 (aged 29)
16	Kieran Trippier HG^{1}	(England)	RB / RWB	19 September 1990 (aged 25)
27	Kevin Wimmer	(Austria)	CB / LB	15 November 1992 (aged 23)
33	Ben Davies HG^{1}	(Wales)	LB / CB	24 April 1993 (aged 23)
Midfielders
6	Nabil Bentaleb U^{21}	(Algeria)	CM / DM	24 November 1994 (aged 21)
8	Ryan Mason HG^{2}	(England)	CM / AM	13 June 1991 (aged 24)
11	Erik Lamela	(Argentina)	RW / SS	4 March 1992 (aged 24)
15	Eric Dier U^{21}	(England)	DM / CB	15 January 1994 (aged 22)
19	Mousa Dembélé	(Belgium)	CM / AM	16 July 1987 (aged 28)
20	Dele Alli U^{21}	(England)	CM / AM	11 April 1996 (aged 20)
22	Nacer Chadli	(Belgium)	LW / SS	2 August 1989 (aged 26)
23	Christian Eriksen	(Denmark)	AM / CM	14 February 1992 (aged 24)
25	Josh Onomah U^{21}	(England)	AM / SS	27 April 1997 (aged 19)
28	Tom Carroll HG^{2}	(England)	CM / AM	28 May 1992 (aged 23)
29	Harry Winks U^{21}	(England)	CM / DM	2 February 1996 (aged 20)
Forwards
7	Son Heung-min	(South Korea)	FW / LW / RW / SS	8 July 1992 (aged 23)
10	Harry Kane (2nd VC)	(England)	FW / SS	28 July 1993 (aged 22)
14	Clinton N'Jie	(Cameroon)	FW / RW	15 August 1993 (aged 22)

- HG^{1} = Association-trained player
- HG^{2} = Club-trained player
- U^{21} = Under 21 players (Contract and Scholars)

== Transfers ==
=== Loans out ===
Date from	Position	Nationality	Name	To	Date until	Ref.
13 July 2015	DM	(England)	Grant Ward	Rotherham United	End of season	(Note: On 1 February 2016, it was announced that Ward would stay at Rotherham United until the end of the season.)
12 August 2015	CB	(England)	Dominic Ball	Rangers	End of season	
12 August 2015	LW	(England)	Nathan Oduwa	Rangers	17 January 2016	(Note: On 18 January 2016, it was announced that Oduwa's loan had been terminated on 17 January 2016.)
14 August 2015	SS	(England)	Shaq Coulthirst	Wigan Athletic	1 November 2015	
14 August 2015	LB	(England)	Connor Ogilvie	Stevenage	End of season	(Note: On 14 September 2015, it was announced that Ogilvie's loan at Stevenage was extended until 4 January 2016. On 12 January 2016, it was announced that Ogilvie would stay at Stevenage for a further month into February 2016. On 8 February 2016, it was announced that Ogilvie would stay at Stevenage for a further month into March 2016. On 7 March 2016, it was announced that Ogilvie would stay at Stevenage until the end of the season.)
1 September 2015	RB	(United States)	DeAndre Yedlin	Sunderland	End of season	
26 September 2015	RW	(Republic of Ireland)	Kenny McEvoy	Stevenage	24 October 2015	
20 November 2015	GK	(England)	Harry Voss	Stevenage	20 December 2015	
25 November 2015	RW	(Republic of Ireland)	Kenny McEvoy	York City	1 January 2016	
26 November 2015	CB	(Democratic Republic of the Congo)	Christian Maghoma	Yeovil Town	1 January 2016	
1 February 2016	CB	(Argentina)	Federico Fazio	Sevilla	End of season	
1 February 2016	AM	(England)	Alex Pritchard	West Brom	End of season	
26 February 2016	LW	(England)	Nathan Oduwa	Colchester	26 March 2016	
4 March 2016	FW	(England)	Ryan Loft	Braintree Town	Unknown	(Note: Loft's loan to Braintree Town constitutes a work experience loan.)

=== Transfers in ===
Date from	Position	Nationality	Name	From	Fee	Ref.
29 May 2015	CB	(Austria)	Kevin Wimmer	1. FC Köln	£4,300,000	
19 June 2015	RB	(England)	Kieran Trippier	Burnley	£3,500,000	
8 July 2015	CB	(Belgium)	Toby Alderweireld	Atlético Madrid	£11,400,000	
15 August 2015	FW	(Cameroon)	Clinton N'Jie	Lyon	£8,300,000	
28 August 2015	FW	(South Korea)	Son Heung-min	Bayer Leverkusen	£22,000,000	
13 January 2016	MF	(England)	Shilow Tracey	Ebbsfleet United	Undisclosed	

Total outgoing: £49,600,000+ ▼

=== Transfers out ===
Date from	Position	Nationality	Name	To	Fee	Ref.
29 June 2015	CM	(Brazil)	Paulinho	Guangzhou Evergrande	£9,900,000	
1 July 2015	CF	(Nigeria)	Daniel Akindayini	Brighton & Hove Albion (Note: Following Akindayini's release he joined Brighton & Hove Albion.)	Free transfer	
1 July 2015	GK	(Scotland)	Jordan Archer	Millwall (Note: Following Archer's release he joined Millwall.)	Free transfer	
1 July 2015	SS	(Spain)	Cristian Ceballos	Charlton Athletic (Note: Following Ceballos' release he joined Charlton Athletic.)	Free transfer	
1 July 2015	GK	(United States)	Brad Friedel	Retired	—N/a	
1 July 2015	CB	(South Africa)	Bongani Khumalo	SuperSport United (Note: Following Khumalo's release he joined SuperSport United.)	Free transfer	
1 July 2015	RB	(Northern Ireland)	Aaron McEneff	Derry City (Note: Following McEneff's release he joined Derry City.)	Free transfer	
1 July 2015	RB	(England)	Alexander McQueen	Carlisle United (Note: Following McQueen's release he joined Carlisle United.)	Free transfer	
1 July 2015	GK	(England)	Jonathan Miles	Ebbsfleet United (Note: Following Miles's release he joined Ebbsfleet United.)	Free transfer	
1 July 2015	AM	(England)	Lloyd Ross	Franklin Pierce Ravens (Note: Following Ross's release he joined Franklin Pierce Ravens Men's Soccer Team.)	Free transfer	
1 July 2015	CM	(Germany)	Lewis Holtby	Hamburger SV	£4,600,000	
6 July 2015	DM	(France)	Étienne Capoue	Watford	£6,300,000	
8 July 2015	LW	(Croatia)	Tomislav Gomelt	Bari (Note: Following Gomelt's release he joined Bari.)	Free transfer	
16 July 2015	CB	(France)	Younès Kaboul	Sunderland	£3,000,000	
20 July 2015	DM	(France)	Benjamin Stambouli	Paris Saint-Germain	£6,000,000	
30 July 2015	CB	(Romania)	Vlad Chiricheș	Napoli	£4,500,000	
6 August 2015	RB	(England)	Ryan Fredericks	Bristol City	£200,000	
7 August 2015	CB	(England)	Grant Hall	Queens Park Rangers	£100,000	
14 August 2015	CF	(Spain)	Roberto Soldado	Villarreal	£10,000,000	
31 August 2015	RW	(Belgium)	Ismail Azzaoui	VfL Wolfsburg	£500,000	
1 September 2015	RM	(England)	Aaron Lennon	Everton	£4,500,000	
13 September 2015	CF	(Togo)	Emmanuel Adebayor	Crystal Palace (Note: Following Adebayor's release by mutual consent, he joined Crystal Palace.)	Free transfer	
5 January 2016	LW	(Republic of Ireland)	Kenny McEvoy	York City	Free transfer	
22 January 2016	CF	(Jamaica)	Shaq Coulthirst	Peterborough United	Undisclosed	
28 January 2016	RW	(England)	Andros Townsend	Newcastle United	£12,000,000	
1 February 2016	CB	(Serbia)	Miloš Veljković	Werder Bremen	£500,000	

Total incoming: ▲£62,100,000+

=== Overall transfer activity ===
==== Spending ====
Summer: ▼£49,600,000

Winter: ▼£0+

Total: ▼£49,600,000+

==== Income ====
Summer: ▲£49,600,000

Winter: ▲£12,500,000+

Total: ▲£62,100,000+

==== Expenditure ====
Summer: £0

Winter: ▲£12,500,000

Total: ▲£12,500,000

== Friendlies ==
=== Pre-season ===
29 July 2015 2015 MLS All-Star Game	MLS All-Stars	2–1	Tottenham Hotspur	Commerce City
19:15 MT	Kaká 19' (pen.); Villa 23'	Report	Kane 36'	Stadium: Dick's Sporting Goods Park; Attendance: 18,671; Referee: Ismail Elfath (United States)

4 August 2015 2015 Audi Cup	Real Madrid	2–0	Tottenham Hotspur	Munich
18:15 (UTC+2)	Rodríguez 36'; Bale 78'	Report		Stadium: Allianz Arena; Attendance: 71,000; Referee: Günter Perl (Germany)

5 August 2015 2015 Audi Cup	Tottenham Hotspur	2–0	Milan	Munich
18:15 (UTC+2)	Chadli 8'; Carroll 71'	Report		Stadium: Allianz Arena; Attendance: 70,000; Referee: Robert Hartmann (Germany)

== Competitions ==
=== Overall ===
Competition	Started round	Final position / round	First match	Last match
Premier League	Matchday 1	3rd	8 August 2015	15 May 2016
FA Cup	Third round	Fifth round	10 January 2016	21 February 2016
League Cup	Third round	Third round	23 September 2015	23 September 2015
Europa League	Group stage	Round of 16	17 September 2015	17 March 2016

Source: Competitions

=== Overview ===
Competition	Record							
Competition	Pld	W	D	L	GF	GA	GD	Win %
Premier League	38	19	13	6	69	35	+34	50.00
FA Cup	4	2	1	1	8	4	+4	50.00
League Cup	1	0	0	1	1	2	−1	0.00
Europa League	10	5	2	3	17	12	+5	50.00
Total	53	26	16	11	95	53	+42	49.06

Source: Competitions

=== Premier League ===
==== League table ====
Pos	Team	Pld	W	D	L	GF	GA	GD	Pts	Qualification or relegation
1	Leicester City (C)	38	23	12	3	68	36	+32	81	Qualification for the Champions League group stage
2	Arsenal	38	20	11	7	65	36	+29	71	Qualification for the Champions League group stage
3	Tottenham Hotspur	38	19	13	6	69	35	+34	70	Qualification for the Champions League group stage
4	Manchester City	38	19	9	10	71	41	+30	66	Qualification for the Champions League play-off round
5	Manchester United	38	19	9	10	49	35	+14	66	Qualification for the Europa League group stage (Note: Manchester United qualified for the Europa League group stage by winning the 2015–16 FA Cup. As they had also qualified by their virtue of their league position (5th), this spot was passed to the next-highest ranked team (6th), Southampton.)

Source: Barclays Premier League
Rules for classification: 1) Points; 2) Goal difference; 3) Goals scored; 4) Play-offs (only if needed to decide champion, teams for relegation or teams for UEFA competitions).
(C) Champions

==== Results summary ====
Overall								Home						Away					
Pld	W	D	L	GF	GA	GD	Pts	W	D	L	GF	GA	GD	W	D	L	GF	GA	GD
38	19	13	6	69	35	+34	70	10	6	3	35	15	+20	9	7	3	34	20	+14

Last updated: 15 May 2016.
Source: Premier League

==== Results by matchday ====
Matchday	1	2	3	4	5	6	7	8	9	10	11	12	13	14	15	16	17	18	19	20	21	22	23	24	25	26	27	28	29	30	31	32	33	34	35	36	37	38
Ground	A	H	A	H	A	H	H	A	H	A	H	A	H	H	A	H	A	H	A	A	H	H	A	A	H	A	H	A	H	A	H	A	H	A	H	A	H	A
Result	L	D	D	D	W	W	W	D	D	W	W	D	W	D	D	L	W	W	W	D	L	W	W	W	W	W	W	L	D	W	W	D	W	W	D	D	L	L
Position	17	13	14	15	12	9	5	8	7	6	5	5	5	5	5	5	4	4	4	4	4	4	4	3	2	2	2	2	2	2	2	2	2	2	2	2	2	3

Updated to match(es) played on 15 May 2016. Source: Statto.com
A = Away; H = Home; W = Win; D = Draw; L = Loss

==== Matches ====
On 17 June 2015, the fixtures for the forthcoming season were announced.

8 August 2015 1	Manchester United	1–0	Tottenham Hotspur	Manchester
12:45 BST	Walker 22' (o.g.)	BBC Report		Stadium: Old Trafford; Attendance: 75,261; Referee: Jonathan Moss

15 August 2015 2	Tottenham Hotspur	2–2	Stoke City	London
15:00 BST	Dier 19'; Chadli 45'	BBC Report	Arnautović 78' (pen.); Diouf 83'	Stadium: White Hart Lane; Attendance: 36,004; Referee: Robert Madley

22 August 2015 3	Leicester City	1–1	Tottenham Hotspur	Leicester
15:00 BST	Mahrez 82'	BBC Report	Alli 81'	Stadium: King Power Stadium; Attendance: 31,971; Referee: Martin Atkinson

29 August 2015 4	Tottenham Hotspur	0–0	Everton	London
17:30 BST		BBC Report		Stadium: White Hart Lane; Attendance: 35,865; Referee: Mike Jones

13 September 2015 5	Sunderland	0–1	Tottenham Hotspur	Sunderland
13:30 BST		BBC Report	Mason 82'	Stadium: Stadium of Light; Attendance: 40,303; Referee: Craig Pawson

20 September 2015 6	Tottenham Hotspur	1–0	Crystal Palace	London
13:30 BST	Son 68'	BBC Report		Stadium: White Hart Lane; Attendance: 35,723; Referee: Michael Oliver

26 September 2015 7	Tottenham Hotspur	4–1	Manchester City	London
12:45 BST	Dier 45'; Alderweireld 50'; Kane 61'; Lamela 79'	BBC Report	De Bruyne 25'	Stadium: White Hart Lane; Attendance: 35,867; Referee: Mark Clattenburg

4 October 2015 8	Swansea City	2–2	Tottenham Hotspur	Swansea
16:00 BST	Ayew 16'; Kane 31' (o.g.)	BBC Report	Eriksen 27', 65'	Stadium: Liberty Stadium; Attendance: 20,845; Referee: Mike Dean

17 October 2015 9	Tottenham Hotspur	0–0	Liverpool	London
12:45 BST		BBC Report		Stadium: White Hart Lane; Attendance: 35,926; Referee: Craig Pawson

25 October 2015 10	Bournemouth	1–5	Tottenham Hotspur	Bournemouth
14:05 GMT	Ritchie 1'	BBC Report	Kane 9' (pen.), 56', 63'; Dembélé 17'; Lamela 29'	Stadium: Dean Court; Attendance: 11,332; Referee: Roger East

2 November 2015 11	Tottenham Hotspur	3–1	Aston Villa	London
20:00 GMT	Dembélé 3'; Alli 45'; Kane 90'	BBC Report	Ayew 79'	Stadium: White Hart Lane; Attendance: 34,882; Referee: Mike Dean

8 November 2015 12	Arsenal	1–1	Tottenham Hotspur	London
16:00 GMT	Gibbs 77'	BBC Report	Kane 32'	Stadium: Emirates Stadium; Attendance: 60,060; Referee: Martin Atkinson

22 November 2015 13	Tottenham Hotspur	4–1	West Ham United	London
16:00 GMT	Kane 23', 50'; Alderweireld 33'; Walker 83'	BBC Report	Lanzini 87'	Stadium: White Hart Lane; Attendance: 35,968; Referee: Anthony Taylor

29 November 2015 14	Tottenham Hotspur	0–0	Chelsea	London
12:00 GMT		BBC Report		Stadium: White Hart Lane; Attendance: 35,639; Referee: Michael Oliver

5 December 2015 15	West Bromwich Albion	1–1	Tottenham Hotspur	West Bromwich
15:00 GMT	McClean 39'	BBC Report	Alli 15'	Stadium: The Hawthorns; Attendance: 23,602; Referee: Jonathan Moss

13 December 2015 16	Tottenham Hotspur	1–2	Newcastle United	London
16:00 GMT	Dier 39'	BBC Report	Mitrović 74'; Pérez 90+3'	Stadium: White Hart Lane; Attendance: 35,768; Referee: Roger East

19 December 2015 17	Southampton	0–2	Tottenham Hotspur	Southampton
15:00 GMT		BBC Report	Kane 40'; Alli 43'	Stadium: St Mary's Stadium; Attendance: 31,636; Referee: Kevin Friend

26 December 2015 18	Tottenham Hotspur	3–0	Norwich City	London
15:00 GMT	Kane 26' (pen.), 42'; Carroll 80'	BBC Report		Stadium: White Hart Lane; Attendance: 35,198; Referee: Mike Jones

28 December 2015 19	Watford	1–2	Tottenham Hotspur	Watford
15:00 GMT	Ighalo 41'	BBC Report	Lamela 17'; Son 89'	Stadium: Vicarage Road; Attendance: 20,730; Referee: Anthony Taylor

3 January 2016 20	Everton	1–1	Tottenham Hotspur	Liverpool
16:00 GMT	Lennon 22'	Report	Alli 45'	Stadium: Goodison Park; Attendance: 38,482; Referee: Michael Oliver

13 January 2016 21	Tottenham Hotspur	0–1	Leicester City	London
20:00 GMT		BBC Report	Huth 83'	Stadium: White Hart Lane; Attendance: 35,850; Referee: Lee Mason

16 January 2016 22	Tottenham Hotspur	4–1	Sunderland	London
12:45 GMT	Eriksen 42', 67'; Dembélé 59'; Kane 79' (pen.)	BBC Report	Van Aanholt 40'	Stadium: White Hart Lane; Attendance: 35,854; Referee: Mike Dean

23 January 2016 23	Crystal Palace	1–3	Tottenham Hotspur	London
15:00 GMT	Vertonghen 30' (o.g.)	BBC Report	Kane 63'; Alli 84'; Chadli 90'	Stadium: Selhurst Park; Attendance: 28,467; Referee: Martin Atkinson

2 February 2016 24	Norwich City	0–3	Tottenham Hotspur	Norwich
19:45 GMT		BBC Report	Alli 2'; Kane 30' (pen.), 90'	Stadium: Carrow Road; Attendance: 27,089; Referee: Kevin Friend

6 February 2016 25	Tottenham Hotspur	1–0	Watford	London
15:00 GMT	Trippier 64'	BBC Report		Stadium: White Hart Lane; Attendance: 35,997; Referee: Roger East

14 February 2016 26	Manchester City	1–2	Tottenham Hotspur	Manchester
16:15 GMT	Iheanacho 74'	BBC Report	Kane 53' (pen.); Eriksen 83'	Stadium: City of Manchester Stadium; Attendance: 54,551; Referee: Mark Clattenburg

28 February 2016 27	Tottenham Hotspur	2–1	Swansea City	London
14:05 GMT	Chadli 70'; Rose 77'	BBC Report	Paloschi 19'	Stadium: White Hart Lane; Attendance: 35,922; Referee: Mike Jones

2 March 2016 28	West Ham United	1–0	Tottenham Hotspur	London
19:45 GMT	Antonio 7'	BBC Report		Stadium: Boleyn Ground; Attendance: 34,977; Referee: Andre Marriner

5 March 2016 29	Tottenham Hotspur	2–2	Arsenal	London
12:45 GMT	Alderweireld 60'; Kane 62'	BBC report	Ramsey 39'; Sánchez 76'	Stadium: White Hart Lane; Attendance: 35,762; Referee: Michael Oliver

13 March 2016 30	Aston Villa	0–2	Tottenham Hotspur	Birmingham
16:00 GMT		BBC report	Kane 45', 48'	Stadium: Villa Park; Attendance: 32,393; Referee: Anthony Taylor

20 March 2016 31	Tottenham Hotspur	3–0	Bournemouth	London
16:00 GMT	Kane 1', 16'; Eriksen 52'	BBC Report		Stadium: White Hart Lane; Attendance: 36,084; Referee: Neil Swarbrick

2 April 2016 32	Liverpool	1–1	Tottenham Hotspur	Liverpool
17:30 BST	Coutinho 51'	BBC Report	Kane 63'	Stadium: Anfield; Attendance: 44,062; Referee: Jonathan Moss

10 April 2016 33	Tottenham Hotspur	3–0	Manchester United	London
16:00 BST	Alli 70'; Alderweireld 74'; Lamela 76'	BBC Report		Stadium: White Hart Lane; Attendance: 35,761; Referee: Mike Dean

18 April 2016 34	Stoke City	0–4	Tottenham Hotspur	Stoke-on-Trent
20:00 BST		BBC Report	Kane 9', 71'; Alli 67', 82'	Stadium: Britannia Stadium; Attendance: 27,442; Referee: Neil Swarbrick

25 April 2016 35	Tottenham Hotspur	1–1	West Bromwich Albion	London
20:00 BST	Dawson 33' (o.g.)	BBC Report	Dawson 73'	Stadium: White Hart Lane; Attendance: 35,923; Referee: Mike Jones

2 May 2016 36	Chelsea	2–2	Tottenham Hotspur	London
20:00 BST	Cahill 58'; Hazard 83'	BBC Report	Kane 35'; Son 44'	Stadium: Stamford Bridge; Attendance: 41,545; Referee: Mark Clattenburg

8 May 2016 37	Tottenham Hotspur	1–2	Southampton	London
13:30 BST	Son 16'	Report	Davis 31', 72'	Stadium: White Hart Lane; Attendance: 35,748; Referee: Jonathan Moss

15 May 2016 38	Newcastle United	5–1	Tottenham Hotspur	Newcastle upon Tyne
13:30 BST	Wijnaldum 19', 73' (pen.); Mitrović 39'; Aarons 85'; Janmaat 86'	Report	Lamela 60'	Stadium: St James' Park; Attendance: 52,183; Referee: Anthony Taylor

=== FA Cup ===
The third round draw was held on 7 December 2015. Spurs were drawn at home to Leicester City. The draw for the fourth round proper was held on 11 January 2016 and Tottenham were drawn away at Colchester United.

10 January 2016 Third round	Tottenham Hotspur	2–2	Leicester City	London
16:00 GMT	Eriksen 8'; Kane 89' (pen.); Bentaleb (yellow card) 90+3'	BBC Report	Wasilewski (yellow card) 15', (goal) 19'; Okazaki 48'; Schmeichel (yellow card) 89'	Stadium: White Hart Lane; Attendance: 35,805; Referee: Robert Madley

20 January 2016 Third round replay	Leicester City	0–2	Tottenham Hotspur	Leicester
19:45 GMT	Albrighton (yellow card) 90'	BBC Report	Davies (yellow card) 20'; Son 39'; Chadli 66'	Stadium: King Power Stadium; Attendance: 30,006; Referee: Anthony Taylor

30 January 2016 Fourth round	Colchester United	1–4	Tottenham Hotspur	Colchester
12:45 GMT	Davies 80' (o.g.)	BBC Report	Chadli 27', 78'; Dier 64'; Carroll 82'	Stadium: Colchester Community Stadium; Attendance: 9,920; Referee: Michael Oliver

21 February 2016 Fifth round	Tottenham Hotspur	0–1	Crystal Palace	London
15:00 GMT		BBC Report	Kelly 45+1'	Stadium: White Hart Lane; Attendance: 35,547; Referee: Craig Pawson

=== League Cup ===
The third round draw was made on 25 August 2015 live on Sky Sports by Charlie Nicholas and Phil Thompson. Spurs were drawn at home against Arsenal.

23 September 2015 Third round	Tottenham Hotspur	1–2	Arsenal	London
19:45 BST	Chambers 56' (o.g.)	BBC Report	Flamini 26', 78'	Stadium: White Hart Lane; Attendance: 35,687; Referee: Andre Marriner

=== UEFA Europa League ===
==== Group stage ====
On 28 August 2015, the draw for the group stage was made in Monaco. Spurs faced Anderlecht, Monaco and Qarabağ in Group J. Spurs topped the group with thirteen points, and were drawn against Serie A side Fiorentina in the Round of 32.

Pos	Team	Pld	W	D	L	GF	GA	GD	Pts	Qualification	TOT	AND	MON	QAR
1	(England) Tottenham Hotspur	6	4	1	1	12	6	+6	13	Advance to knockout phase	—	2–1	4–1	3–1
2	(Belgium) Anderlecht	6	3	1	2	8	6	+2	10	Advance to knockout phase	2–1	—	1–1	2–1
3	(France) Monaco	6	1	3	2	5	9	−4	6		1–1	0–2	—	1–0
4	(Azerbaijan) Qarabağ	6	1	1	4	4	8	−4	4		0–1	1–0	1–1	—

Source: Soccerway
Rules for classification: Group stage tiebreakers

17 September 2015 1	Tottenham Hotspur (England)	3–1	(Azerbaijan) Qarabağ	London
20:05 BST	Son 28', 30'; Lamela 86'	UEFA Report	Oliveira 7' (pen.)	Stadium: White Hart Lane; Attendance: 26,463; Referee: Adrien Jaccottet (Switzerland)

1 October 2015 2	Monaco (France)	1–1	(England) Tottenham Hotspur	Monaco
18:00 BST	El Shaarawy 81'	UEFA Report	Lamela 35'	Stadium: Stade Louis II; Attendance: 7,216; Referee: Artur Soares Dias (Portugal)

22 October 2015 3	Anderlecht (Belgium)	2–1	(England) Tottenham Hotspur	Anderlecht
18:00 BST	Gillet 13'; Okaka 75'	UEFA Report	Eriksen 4'	Stadium: Constant Vanden Stock Stadium; Attendance: 18,504; Referee: Pol van Boekel (Netherlands)

5 November 2015 4	Tottenham Hotspur (England)	2–1	(Belgium) Anderlecht	London
20:05 GMT	Kane 29'; Dembélé 87'	UEFA Report	Ezekiel 72'	Stadium: White Hart Lane; Attendance: 33,479; Referee: Orel Grinfeld (Israel)

26 November 2015 5	Qarabağ (Azerbaijan)	0–1	(England) Tottenham Hotspur	Baku, Azerbaijan
18:00 GMT		UEFA Report	Kane 78'	Stadium: Tofiq Bahramov Stadium; Attendance: 28,000; Referee: Taros Sidiropoulos (Greece)

10 December 2015 6	Tottenham Hotspur (England)	4–1	(France) Monaco	London
20:05 GMT	Lamela 2', 15', 38'; Carroll 78'	UEFA Report	El Shaarawy 61'	Stadium: White Hart Lane; Attendance: 34,122; Referee: Ivan Bebek (Croatia)

==== Knockout phase ====
===== Round of 32 =====
18 February 2016 First leg	Fiorentina (Italy)	1–1	(England) Tottenham Hotspur	Florence
18:00 GMT	Bernardeschi 59'	UEFA Report	Chadli 37' (pen.)	Stadium: Stadio Artemio Franchi; Attendance: 16,536; Referee: Felix Zwayer (Germany)

25 February 2016 Second leg	Tottenham Hotspur (England)	3–0 (4–1 agg.)	(Italy) Fiorentina	London
20:05 GMT	Mason 25'; Lamela 63'; Gonzalo 81' (o.g.)	UEFA Report		Stadium: White Hart Lane; Attendance: 34,880; Referee: Ovidiu Haţegan (Romania)

===== Round of 16 =====
10 March 2016 First leg	Borussia Dortmund (Germany)	3–0	(England) Tottenham Hotspur	Dortmund, Germany
18:00 GMT	Aubameyang 30'; Reus 61', 70'	UEFA Report		Stadium: Signal Iduna Park; Attendance: 65,848; Referee: Cüneyt Çakır (Turkey)

17 March 2016 Second leg	Tottenham Hotspur (England)	1–2 (1–5 agg.)	(Germany) Borussia Dortmund	London
20:05 GMT	Son 73'	UEFA report	Aubameyang 24', 70'	Stadium: White Hart Lane; Attendance: 34,593; Referee: Nicola Rizzoli (Italy)

== Statistics ==
=== Appearances ===
Last updated: 20 May 2018.
Source: Tottenham Hotspur F.C.

No.	Pos.	Name	Premier League		FA Cup		League Cup		Europa League		Total	
No.	Pos.	Name	Apps	Goals	Apps	Goals	Apps	Goals	Apps	Goals	Apps	Goals
Goalkeepers
1	GK	(France) Hugo Lloris	37	0	0	0	0	0	9	0	46	0
13	GK	(Netherlands) Michel Vorm	1	0	4	0	1	0	1	0	7	0
Defenders
2	DF	(England) Kyle Walker	33	1	2	0	0	0	0	0	35	1
3	DF	(England) Danny Rose	24	1	2	0	1	0	2+1	0	29+1	1
4	DF	(Belgium) Toby Alderweireld	38	4	1	0	0	0	10	0	49	4
5	DF	(Belgium) Jan Vertonghen	29	0	0	0	0	0	4	0	33	0
15	DF	(England) Eric Dier	37	3	4	1	1	0	8+1	0	50+1	4
16	DF	(England) Kieran Trippier	5+1	1	2	0	1	0	10	0	18+1	1
21	DF	(Argentina) Federico Fazio	0	0	0	0	1	0	0	0	1	0
27	DF	(Austria) Kevin Wimmer	9+1	0	4	0	1	0	6	0	20+1	0
33	DF	(Wales) Ben Davies	14+3	0	2	0	0	0	8	0	24+3	0
Midfielders
6	MF	(Algeria) Nabil Bentaleb	2+3	0	3+1	0	0	0	0+2	0	5+6	0
8	MF	(England) Ryan Mason	8+14	1	0+1	0	0	0	6	1	14+15	2
11	MF	(Argentina) Erik Lamela	28+6	5	2	0	0	0	7+1	6	37+7	11
19	MF	(Belgium) Mousa Dembélé	27+2	3	1+1	0	0	0	1+3	1	29+6	4
20	MF	(England) Dele Alli	28+5	10	1+2	0	0+1	0	7+2	0	36+10	10
22	MF	(Belgium) Nacer Chadli	10+19	3	3+1	3	1	0	5+1	1	19+21	7
23	MF	(Denmark) Christian Eriksen	33+2	6	3+1	1	1	0	7	1	44+3	8
24	MF	(England) Alex Pritchard	0+1	0	0	0	0	0	0	0	0+1	0
25	MF	(England) Josh Onomah	0+8	0	2+2	0	0	0	2+5	0	4+15	0
28	MF	(England) Tom Carroll	4+15	1	3	1	1	0	4+3	1	12+18	3
29	MF	(England) Harry Winks	0	0	0	0	0	0	0+2	0	0+2	0
Forwards
7	FW	(South Korea) Son Heung-min	13+15	4	3+1	1	0+1	0	6+1	3	22+18	8
10	FW	(England) Harry Kane	38	25	2+2	1	1	0	3+4	2	44+6	28
14	FW	(Cameroon) Clinton N'Jie	0+8	0	0	0	0+1	0	2+3	0	2+12	0
Players transferred out during the season.
17	MF	(England) Andros Townsend	0+3	0	0	0	1	0	2+1	0	3+4	0

=== Goal scorers ===
The list is sorted by squad number when total goals are equal.

Rnk	Pos	No.	Player	Premier League	FA Cup	League Cup	Europa League	Total
1	FW	10	(England) Harry Kane	25	1	0	2	28
2	MF	11	(Argentina) Erik Lamela	5	0	0	6	11
3	MF	20	(England) Dele Alli	10	0	0	0	10
4	FW	7	(South Korea) Son Heung-min	4	1	0	3	8
4	MF	23	(Denmark) Christian Eriksen	6	1	0	1	8
6	MF	22	(Belgium) Nacer Chadli	3	3	0	1	7
7	DF	4	(Belgium) Toby Alderweireld	4	0	0	0	4
7	DF	15	(England) Eric Dier	3	1	0	0	4
7	MF	19	(Belgium) Mousa Dembele	3	0	0	1	4
10	MF	28	(England) Tom Carroll	1	1	0	1	3
11	MF	8	(England) Ryan Mason	1	0	0	1	2
12	DF	2	(England) Kyle Walker	1	0	0	0	1
12	DF	3	(England) Danny Rose	1	0	0	0	1
12	DF	16	(England) Kieran Trippier	1	0	0	0	1
TOTALS				68	8	0	16	92

Last updated: 13 May 2018.
Source: Tottenham Hotspur F.C.

==== Hat-tricks ====
Player	Against	Competition	Minutes	Score after goals	Result	Date
(England) Harry Kane	(England) Bournemouth	Premier League	9', 56', 63'	1-1, 1-4, 1-5	1-5 (A)	25 October 2015
(Argentina) Erik Lamela	(France) Monaco	Europa League	2', 15', 38'	1-0, 2-0, 3-0	4-1 (H)	10 December 2015

==== Own goals ====
Player	Against	Competition	Minute	Score after own goal	Result	Date
(England) Kyle Walker	(England) Manchester United	Premier League	22'	1-0	1-0 (A)	8 August 2015
(England) Harry Kane	(England) Swansea	Premier League	31'	2-1	2-2 (A)	4 October 2015
(Belgium) Jan Vertonghen	(England) Crystal Palace	Premier League	30'	1-0	1-3 (A)	23 January 2016
(Wales) Ben Davies	(England) Colchester	FA Cup	80'	1-3	1-4 (A)	30 January 2016

=== Clean sheets ===
The list is sorted by squad number when total clean sheets are equal.

Rnk	No.	Player	Premier League	FA Cup	League Cup	Europa League	Total
1	1	(France) Hugo Lloris	13	0	0	2	15
2	13	(Netherlands) Michel Vorm	0	1	0	0	1

Last updated: 9 May 2018.
Source: Tottenham Hotspur F.C.
