= 2011 Audi Cup =

Tournament details
- Host country: Germany
- Dates: 26 July – 27 July
- Teams: 4 (from 2 confederations)
- Venue(s): 1 (in 1 host city)

Final positions
- Champions: (Spain) Barcelona (1st title)
- Runners-up: (Germany) Bayern Munich
- Third place: (Brazil) Internacional
- Fourth place: (Italy) Milan

Tournament statistics
- Matches played: 4
- Goals scored: 12 (3 per match)
- Attendance: 264,000 (66,000 per match)
- Top scorer(s): (Spain) Thiago (3 goals)

The second edition of the Audi Cup was a two-day association football tournament that featured four teams. It was played at the Allianz Arena in Munich, Germany. The competition hosted the defending champions Bayern Munich, the 2010 Copa Libertadores champions Internacional, the 2010–11 UEFA Champions League winners Barcelona and the 2007 FIFA Club World Cup champions Milan. The winners of the tournament were Barcelona, beating Bayern Munich 2–0 in the final. Internacional defeated Milan in the third place match after a penalty shoot-out.

== Participating teams ==
- Bayern Munich (Germany)
- Milan (Italy)
- Barcelona (Spain)
- Internacional (Brazil)

== Competition format ==
The competition took the format of a regular knock-out competition. The winners of each of the two matches on the first day competed against each other for the Audi Cup, whilst the two losing sides played in a third-place match. The trophy contested over two days, each day seeing two matches played back-to-back. The official matchups were announced on 8 May 2011.

Semi-finals; 26 July
18:15
(Spain) Barcelona | 2 (4)
(Brazil) Internacional | 2 (2)
20:45
(Germany) Bayern Munich | 1 (5)
(Italy) Milan | 1 (3)

Final; 27 July
20:45
(Spain) Barcelona | 2
(Germany) Bayern Munich | 0
Third place
18:15
(Brazil) Internacional | 2 (2)
(Italy) Milan | 2 (0)

== Matches ==
All times are local (CEST; UTC+02:00).

=== Semi-finals ===
26 July 2011
18:15

| Barcelona (Spain) | 2–2 | (Brazil) Internacional |
|---|---|---|
| Thiago 15'; Dos Santos 63' | Report | Nei 55'; Leandro Damião 85' |
Penalties
| Villa (penalty scored); Dos Santos (penalty scored); Carmona (penalty scored); Jeffrén (penalty missed); Armando (penalty scored) | 4–2 | (penalty scored) Kléber; (penalty missed) Leandro Damião; (penalty scored) João Paulo; (penalty missed) Zé Mário |

Allianz Arena, Munich
Attendance: 66,000
Referee: Felix Brych (Munich)

26 July 2011
20:45

| Bayern Munich (Germany) | 1–1 | (Italy) Milan |
|---|---|---|
| Kroos 34' | Report | Ibrahimović 4' |
Penalties
| Alaba (penalty scored); Gómez (penalty scored); Müller (penalty scored); Kroos (penalty scored); Schweinsteiger (penalty scored) | 5–3 | (penalty scored) Robinho; (penalty scored) Oddo; (penalty scored) Thiago Silva; (penalty missed) Paloschi |

Allianz Arena, Munich
Attendance: 66,000
Referee: Peter Sippel (Munich)

=== Third place play-off ===
27 July 2011
18:15

| Internacional (Brazil) | 2–2 | (Italy) Milan |
|---|---|---|
| Leandro Damião 23'; D'Alessandro 80' | Report | Ibrahimović 3'; Pato 60' |
Penalties
| D'Alessandro (penalty scored); Nei (penalty scored); Glaydson (penalty missed) | 2–0 | (penalty missed) Valoti; (penalty missed) Cassano; (penalty missed) Oddo; (penalty missed) Pato |

Allianz Arena, Munich
Attendance: 66,000
Referee: Günter Perl (Pullach)

=== Final ===
27 July 2011
20:45

| Barcelona (Spain) | 2–0 | (Germany) Bayern Munich |
|---|---|---|
| Thiago 42', 75' | Report |

Allianz Arena, Munich
Attendance: 66,000
Referee: Wolfgang Stark (Ergolding)

| Barcelona | Bayern Munich |

== Goalscorers ==
3 goals

- (Spain) Thiago (Barcelona)

2 goals

- (Brazil) Leandro Damião (Internacional)
- (Sweden) Zlatan Ibrahimović (Milan)

1 goal

- (Mexico) Jonathan dos Santos (Barcelona)
- (Brazil) Nei (Internacional)
- (Argentina) Andrés D'Alessandro (Internacional)
- (Germany) Toni Kroos (Bayern Munich)
- (Brazil) Alexandre Pato (Milan)

== Television broadcasters ==
The competition was broadcast in the United Kingdom on ITV4. It was also broadcast in other countries, including Rai Sport in Italy.
