= Audi Cup =

Football tournament

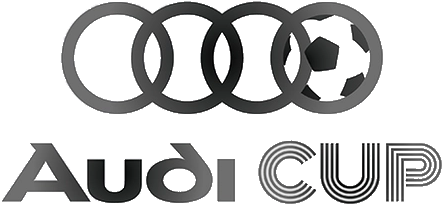
- Founded: 2009; 17 years ago
- Region: Munich, Germany
- Teams: 3 (formerly 4)
- Current champions: (Germany) Bayern Munich (2026)
- Most championships: (Germany) Bayern Munich (4 titles)
- Broadcaster(s): ZDF (Germany) (2009-2015, 2019–); ARD (Germany) (2017)
- 2019 Audi Cup

The Audi Cup is a biennial two-day pre-season friendly football tournament that features four teams, hosted by the German club Bayern Munich, and is staged at the Allianz Arena in Munich, Germany. It has been held every two years since 2009 (except 2021, 2023 and 2025), opposite the FIFA World Cup and UEFA Euro, before the start of the Bundesliga season as well. It does not count as a formal trophy.

== History ==
The first Audi Cup in 2009 was organised and promoted by car manufacturer Audi AG to celebrate their 100th year of trading, and was won by hosts Bayern Munich. It was held in place of the Franz Beckenbauer Cup, which took place in 2007, 2008 and 2010. The second Audi Cup took place in 2011 and was won by Barcelona of Spain. Bayern Munich won the next two Audi Cups, beating Manchester City 2–1 in the 2013 final and Real Madrid 1–0 in 2015. Atlético Madrid claimed the title in 2017 with a victory on penalties after a 1–1 draw with Liverpool, before Tottenham Hotspur also required penalties against Bayern Munich to win their first Audi Cup in 2019.

In 2026, the match is named as the Audi Football Summit.

From 2016 to 2018, as part of the International Champions Cup, two of Bayern Munich's matches each year were also called the Audi Football Summit. The matches were:

July 21, 2018
16:05 CEST
Audi Football Summit

Bayern Munich (Germany)	3–1	(France) Paris Saint-Germain
Martínez 60'; Sanches 68'; Zirkzee 78'	Report	Weah 31'

Wörthersee Stadion, Klagenfurt
Attendance: 22,300
Referee: Alexander Harkam (Austria)

July 28, 2018
19:05 EDT
Audi Football Summit

Bayern Munich (Germany)	2–3	(England) Manchester City
Shabani 15'; Robben 24'	Report	B. Silva 45+1', 70'; Nmecha 51'

Hard Rock Stadium, Miami Gardens
Attendance: 29,195
Referee: Ted Unkel (United States)

== Results ==
Ed.	Year	Winners	Score	Runners-up	Third place	Score	Fourth place
1	2009	(Germany) Bayern Munich	0–0 (7–6 p)	(England) Manchester United	(Argentina) Boca Juniors	1–1 (4–3 p)	(Italy) Milan
2	2011	(Spain) Barcelona	2–0	(Germany) Bayern Munich	(Brazil) Internacional	2–2 (2–1 p)	(Italy) Milan
3	2013	(Germany) Bayern Munich	2–1	(England) Manchester City	(Italy) Milan	1–0	(Brazil) São Paulo
4	2015	(Germany) Bayern Munich	1–0	(Spain) Real Madrid	(England) Tottenham Hotspur	2–0	(Italy) Milan
5	2017	(Spain) Atlético Madrid	1–1 (5–4 p)	(England) Liverpool	(Italy) Napoli	2–0	(Germany) Bayern Munich
6	2019	(England) Tottenham Hotspur	2–2 (6–5 p)	(Germany) Bayern Munich	(Spain) Real Madrid	5–3	(Turkey) Fenerbahçe
7	2026	(Germany) Bayern Munich	2–1	(England) Aston Villa	(South Korea) Jeju SK FC	N/A	N/A

== Performance by team ==
The Audi Cup is hosted by Bayern Munich, who have participated in the competition all six times, and excluding them, Milan has participated in the most Audi Cup tournaments, with four. Barcelona were invited in 2011 and won the cup in their only participation, as did Atlético Madrid in their sole outing in 2017.

Team	Winners	Runners-up	Third place	Fourth place
(Germany) Bayern Munich	4 (2009, 2013, 2015, 2026)	2 (2011, 2019)	–	1 (2017)
(England) Tottenham Hotspur	1 (2019)	–	1 (2015)	–
(Spain) Barcelona	1 (2011)	–	–	–
(Spain) Atlético Madrid	1 (2017)	–	–	–
(Spain) Real Madrid	–	1 (2015)	1 (2019)	–
(England) Manchester United	–	1 (2009)	–	–
(England) Manchester City	–	1 (2013)	–	–
(England) Liverpool	–	1 (2017)	–	–
(England) Aston Villa	–	1 (2026)	–	–
(Italy) Milan	–	–	1 (2013)	3 (2009, 2011, 2015)
(Argentina) Boca Juniors	–	–	1 (2009)	–
(Brazil) Internacional	–	–	1 (2011)	–
(Italy) Napoli	–	–	1 (2017)	–
(South Korea) Jeju SK FC	–	–	1 (2026)	–
(Brazil) São Paulo	–	–	–	1 (2013)
(Turkey) Fenerbahçe	–	–	–	1 (2019)

== Performance by country ==
Country	Winners	Runners-up	Third place	Fourth place
Germany	4 (2009, 2013, 2015, 2026)	2 (2011, 2019)	–	1 (2017)
Spain	2 (2011, 2017)	1 (2015)	1 (2019)	–
England	1 (2019)	4 (2009, 2013, 2017, 2026)	1 (2015)	–
Italy	–	–	2 (2013, 2017)	3 (2009, 2011, 2015)
Brazil	–	–	1 (2011)	1 (2013)
Argentina	–	–	1 (2009)	–
South Korea	–	–	1 (2026)	–
Turkey	–	–	–	1 (2019)

== Top goalscorers ==
Position	Player	Club	Goals
1	(Germany) Thomas Müller	(Germany) Bayern Munich	6
2	(France) Karim Benzema	(Spain) Real Madrid	3
2	(Spain) Thiago	(Spain) Barcelona	3
4	(Brazil) Leandro Damião	(Brazil) Internacional	2
4	(Bosnia and Herzegovina) Edin Džeko	(England) Manchester City	2
4	(Italy) Stephan El Shaarawy	(Italy) Milan	2
4	(Sweden) Zlatan Ibrahimović	(Italy) Milan	2
4	(Poland) Robert Lewandowski	(Germany) Bayern Munich	2
4	(Croatia) Mario Mandžukić	(Germany) Bayern Munich	2

== See also ==
- Uli Hoeneß Cup
