= 2017 Audi Cup =

Tournament details
- Host country: Germany
- Dates: 1–2 August
- Teams: 4 (from 1 confederation)
- Venue(s): 1 (in 1 host city)

Final positions
- Champions: (Spain) Atlético Madrid (1st title)
- Runners-up: (England) Liverpool
- Third place: (Italy) Napoli
- Fourth place: (Germany) Bayern Munich

Tournament statistics
- Matches played: 4
- Goals scored: 10 (2.5 per match)
- Attendance: 247,000 (61,750 per match)
- Top scorer(s): Ten players (1 goal each)

The 2017 Audi Cup was the fifth edition of the Audi Cup, a two-day association football tournament that featured four teams and be played at the Allianz Arena in Munich, Germany. The competition featured the hosts and 2015 winners Bayern Munich, Spanish side Atlético Madrid, English side Liverpool, and Italian side Napoli.

The competition was won by Atlético Madrid, who defeated Liverpool in the final 5–4 on penalties after a 1–1 draw.

== Participating teams ==
- (Germany) Bayern Munich
- (Spain) Atlético Madrid
- (England) Liverpool
- (Italy) Napoli

== Competition format ==
The competition had the format of a regular knockout competition. The winners of each of the two matches on the first day competed against each other for the Audi Cup, while the two losing sides played in a third-place match. The trophy was contested over two days, with each day seeing two matches played back-to-back.

Semi-finals
1 August
(Germany) Bayern Munich	0
(England) Liverpool	3
1 August
(Spain) Atlético Madrid	2
(Italy) Napoli	1

Final
2 August
(England) Liverpool	1 (4)
(Spain) Atlético Madrid (p)	1 (5)
Third place play-off
2 August
(Germany) Bayern Munich	0
(Italy) Napoli	2

== Matches ==
All times Central European Summer Time (UTC+2)

=== Semi-finals ===
1 August 2017
17:45

Atlético Madrid (Spain)	2–1	(Italy) Napoli
Torres 72'; Vietto 81'	Report	Callejón 56'

Allianz Arena, Munich
Attendance: 57,500
Referee: Benjamin Brand (Germany)

1 August 2017
20:30

Bayern Munich (Germany)	0–3	(England) Liverpool
	Report	Mané 7'; Salah 34'; Sturridge 83'

Allianz Arena, Munich
Attendance: 57,500
Referee: Robert Hartmann (Germany)

=== Third place play-off ===
2 August 2017
17:45

Bayern Munich (Germany)	0–2	(Italy) Napoli
	Report	Koulibaly 14'; Giaccherini 55'

Allianz Arena, Munich
Attendance: 66,000
Referee: Benjamin Cortus (Germany)

=== Final ===
2 August 2017
20:30

Liverpool (England)	1–1	(Spain) Atlético Madrid
Firmino 83' (pen.)	Report	Bare 33'
Penalties
Firmino (penalty scored); Henderson (penalty missed); Origi (penalty scored); Kent (penalty scored); Grujić (penalty scored)	4–5	(penalty scored) Griezmann; (penalty scored) Torres; (penalty scored) Gabi; (penalty scored) Gaitán; (penalty scored) Filipe Luís

Allianz Arena, Munich
Attendance: 66,000
Referee: Felix Brych (Germany)

Liverpool	Atlético Madrid

== Goalscorers ==
1 goal

- (Albania) Keidi Bare (Atlético Madrid)
- (Spain) José Callejón (Napoli)
- (Brazil) Roberto Firmino (Liverpool)
- (Italy) Emanuele Giaccherini (Napoli)
- (Senegal) Kalidou Koulibaly (Napoli)
- (Senegal) Sadio Mané (Liverpool)
- (Egypt) Mohamed Salah (Liverpool)
- (England) Daniel Sturridge (Liverpool)
- (Spain) Fernando Torres (Atlético Madrid)
- (Argentina) Luciano Vietto (Atlético Madrid)
