= 2019 Audi Cup =

Tournament details
- Host country: Germany
- Dates: 30–31 July
- Teams: 4 (from 1 confederation)
- Venue: 1 (in 1 host city)

Final positions
- Champions: (England) Tottenham Hotspur (1st title)
- Runners-up: (Germany) Bayern Munich
- Third place: (Spain) Real Madrid
- Fourth place: (Turkey) Fenerbahçe

Tournament statistics
- Matches played: 4
- Goals scored: 20 (5 per match)
- Top scorer(s): Karim Benzema; Thomas Müller (3 goals each)

The 2019 Audi Cup was the sixth edition of the Audi Cup, a two-day association football tournament that featured four teams and was played at the Allianz Arena in Munich, Germany. The competition featured the hosts Bayern Munich, Spanish side Real Madrid, English side Tottenham Hotspur, and Turkish side Fenerbahçe.

This was Tottenham's second participation in the tournament since 2015.

The competition was won by Tottenham Hotspur, who defeated hosts Bayern Munich in the final 6–5 on penalties after a 2–2 draw.

== Venue ==
Munich	2019 Audi Cup is located in Germany
Allianz Arena	2019 Audi Cup is located in Germany
48°13′7.59″N 11°37′29.11″E	2019 Audi Cup is located in Germany
Capacity: 70,000 seats	2019 Audi Cup is located in Germany

== Competition format ==
The competition had the format of a regular knockout competition. The winners of each of the two matches on the first day competed against each other for the Audi Cup, while the two losing sides played in a third-place match. The trophy was contested over two days, with each day seeing two matches played back-to-back.

== Bracket ==
Semi-finals
30 July
(Spain) Real Madrid	0
(England) Tottenham Hotspur	1
30 July
(Germany) Bayern Munich	6
(Turkey) Fenerbahçe	1

Final
31 July
(England) Tottenham Hotspur (p)	2 (6)
(Germany) Bayern Munich	2 (5)
Third place play-off
31 July
(Spain) Real Madrid	5
(Turkey) Fenerbahçe	3

== Matches ==
=== Semi-finals ===
30 July 2019
18:00

Real Madrid (Spain)	0–1	(England) Tottenham Hotspur
	Report	Kane 22'

Allianz Arena, Munich
Referee: Tobias Stieler (Germany)

30 July 2019
20:30

Bayern Munich (Germany)	6–1	(Turkey) Fenerbahçe
Sanches 22'; Goretzka 28'; Müller 31', 44' (pen.), 58'; Coman 40'	Report	Kruse 64'

Allianz Arena, Munich
Referee: Felix Brych (Germany)

=== Third place play-off ===
31 July 2019
18:00

Real Madrid (Spain)	5–3	(Turkey) Fenerbahçe
Benzema 12', 27', 53'; Nacho 62'; Mariano 79'	Report	Rodrigues 6'; Dirar 34'; Tufan 59'

Allianz Arena, Munich
Referee: Benjamin Cortus (Germany)

=== Final ===
31 July 2019
20:30

Tottenham Hotspur (England)	2–2	(Germany) Bayern Munich
Lamela 19'; Eriksen 59'	Report	Arp 61'; Davies 81'
Penalties
Alderweireld (penalty scored); Eriksen (penalty missed); Kane (penalty scored); Son Heung-min (penalty scored); Roles (penalty scored); Skipp (penalty scored); Tanganga (penalty scored)	6–5	(penalty missed) Alaba; (penalty scored) Thiago; (penalty scored) Müller; (penalty scored) Sanches; (penalty scored) Lewandowski; (penalty scored) Singh; (penalty missed) Boateng

Allianz Arena, Munich
Attendance: 67,500
Referee: Robert Hartmann (Germany)

Tottenham Hotspur	Bayern Munich

== Goalscorers ==
3 goals

- (France) Karim Benzema (Real Madrid)
- (Germany) Thomas Müller (Bayern Munich)

1 goal

- (Germany) Fiete Arp (Bayern Munich)
- (France) Kingsley Coman (Bayern Munich)
- (Canada) Alphonso Davies (Bayern Munich)
- (Morocco) Nabil Dirar (Fenerbahçe)
- (Denmark) Christian Eriksen (Tottenham Hotspur)
- (Germany) Leon Goretzka (Bayern Munich)
- (England) Harry Kane (Tottenham Hotspur)
- (Germany) Max Kruse (Fenerbahçe)
- (Argentina) Erik Lamela (Tottenham Hotspur)
- (Dominican Republic) Mariano (Real Madrid)
- (Spain) Nacho (Real Madrid)
- (Cape Verde) Garry Rodrigues (Fenerbahçe)
- (Portugal) Renato Sanches (Bayern Munich)
- (Turkey) Ozan Tufan (Fenerbahçe)
