= Franz Beckenbauer Cup =

- Founded: 2007
- Region: Munich
- Teams: 2
- Most championships: Real Madrid, Barcelona, Internazionale (1 title each)

The Franz Beckenbauer Cup was an annual friendly association football match named in honour of Franz Beckenbauer. It was organised by Bayern Munich before the beginning of the season, and played between the hosts and a guest team at the Allianz Arena.

Inspiration for the cup came from Bayern's participation in the 2006 Joan Gamper Trophy.

== Matches ==
In case of a draw after regular time, the winner is immediately decided on penalties. No extra time is played.

Year	Date	Champion	Runner-up	Score
2007	15 August	(Spain) Barcelona	(Germany) Bayern Munich	1–0 (Messi 85')
2008	5 August	(Italy) Internazionale	(Germany) Bayern Munich	1–0 (Mancini 52')
2009	Audi Cup held instead			
2010	13 August	(Spain) Real Madrid	(Germany) Bayern Munich	0–0 (4–2 p)
later	Audi Cup held instead			
