= 2015 Audi Cup =

Tournament details
- Host country: Germany
- Dates: 4–5 August
- Teams: 4 (from 1 confederation)
- Venue: 1 (in 1 host city)

Final positions
- Champions: (Germany) Bayern Munich (3rd title)
- Runners-up: (Spain) Real Madrid
- Third place: (England) Tottenham Hotspur
- Fourth place: (Italy) Milan

Tournament statistics
- Matches played: 4
- Goals scored: 8 (2 per match)
- Attendance: 282,000 (70,500 per match)
- Top scorer: (Poland) Robert Lewandowski (2 goals)

The 2015 Audi Cup was the fourth edition of the Audi Cup, a two-day association football tournament that featured four teams and was played at the Allianz Arena in Munich, Germany. The competition hosted the 2009 Audi Cup winners Bayern Munich, the 2014 UEFA Champions league winners Real Madrid, 18-time Italian champions Milan, and eight-time FA Cup and two times UEFA Cup winners Tottenham Hotspur.

== Participating teams ==
- (Germany) Bayern Munich
- (Spain) Real Madrid
- (Italy) AC Milan
- (England) Tottenham Hotspur

== Competition format ==
The competition took the format of a regular knock-out competition. The winners of each of the two matches on the first day competed against each other for the Audi Cup, while the two losing sides played in a third-place match. The trophy contested over two days, each day seeing two matches played back-to-back.

Semi-finals
4 August
(Spain) Real Madrid	2
(England) Tottenham Hotspur	0
4 August
(Germany) Bayern Munich	3
(Italy) Milan	0

Final
5 August
(Spain) Real Madrid	0
(Germany) Bayern Munich	1
Third place
5 August
(England) Tottenham Hotspur	2
(Italy) Milan	0

== Matches ==
All times are local (CEST / UTC+02:00)

=== Semi-finals ===
4 August 2015
18:15

Real Madrid (Spain)	2–0	(England) Tottenham Hotspur
Rodríguez 36'; Bale 79'	Report

Allianz Arena, Munich
Attendance: 71,000
Referee: Günter Perl (Germany)

4 August 2015
20:45

Bayern Munich (Germany)	3–0	(Italy) Milan
Bernat 23'; Götze 74'; Lewandowski 85'	Report

Allianz Arena, Munich
Attendance: 71,000
Referee: Peter Sippel (Germany)

=== Third place match-up ===
5 August 2015
18:15

Tottenham Hotspur (England)	2–0	(Italy) Milan
Chadli 8'; Carroll 71'	Report

Allianz Arena, Munich
Attendance: 70,000
Referee: Robert Hartmann (Germany)

=== Final ===
5 August 2015
20:45

Real Madrid (Spain)	0–1	(Germany) Bayern Munich
	Report	Lewandowski 88'

Allianz Arena, Munich
Attendance: 49 000
Referee: Felix Brych (Germany)

Real Madrid	Bayern Munich

== Goalscorers ==
2 goals

- (Poland) Robert Lewandowski (Bayern Munich)

1 goal

- (Wales) Gareth Bale (Real Madrid)
- (Spain) Juan Bernat (Bayern Munich)
- (England) Tom Carroll (Tottenham Hotspur)
- (Belgium) Nacer Chadli (Tottenham Hotspur)
- (Colombia) James Rodríguez (Real Madrid)
- (Germany) Mario Götze (Bayern Munich)
