= Tom Carroll (English footballer) =

English footballer (born 1992)

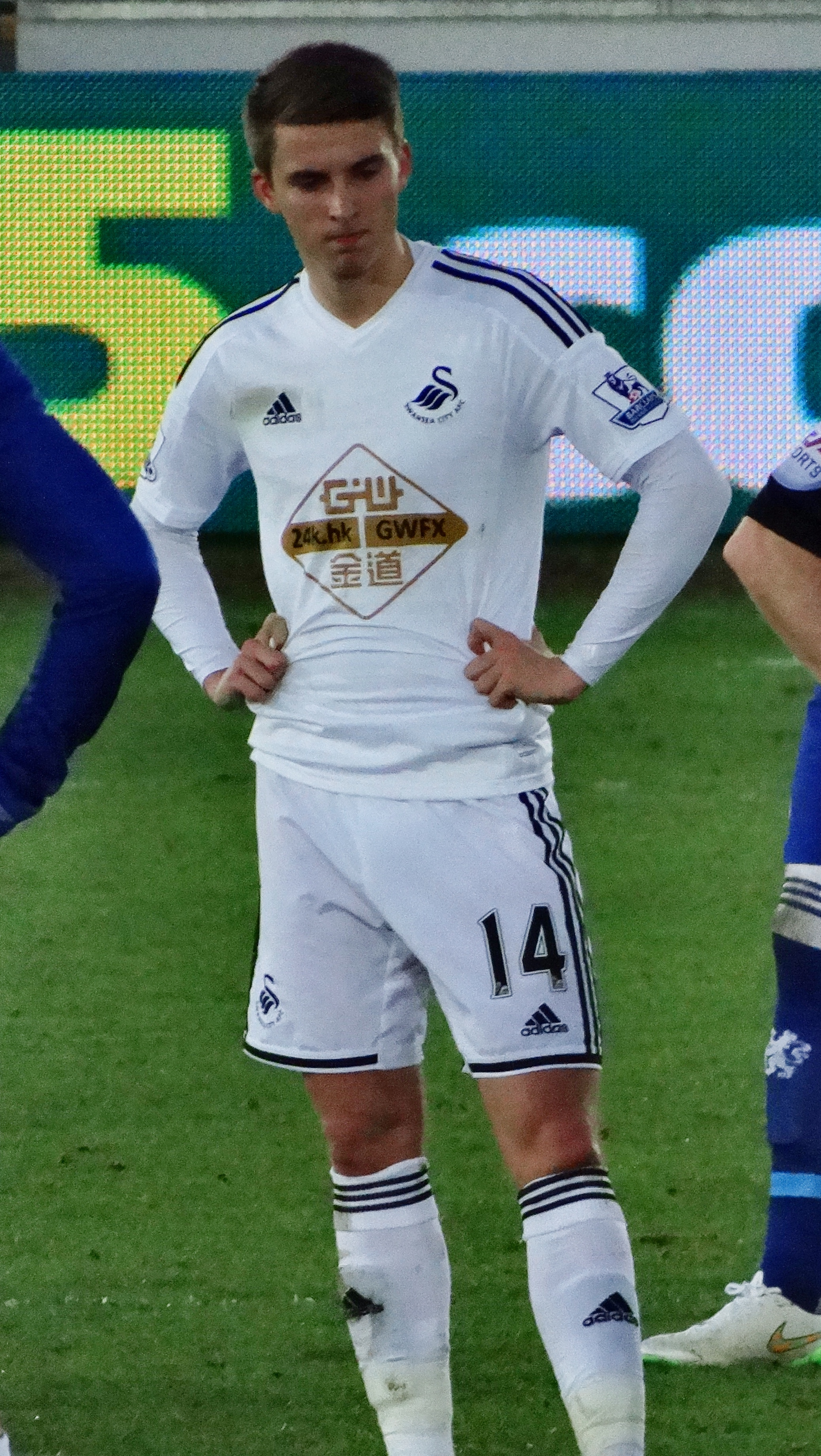
- Carroll playing for Swansea City in 2015

Personal information
- Full name: Thomas James Carroll
- Date of birth: 28 May 1992 (age 34)
- Place of birth: Watford, England
- Height: 5 ft 10 in (1.77 m)
- Position: Midfielder

Youth career
- 2008–2010: Tottenham Hotspur

Senior career*
Years	Team	Apps	(Gls)
2010–2017	Tottenham Hotspur	64	(3)
2010–2011	→ Leyton Orient (loan)	12	(0)
2011–2012	→ Derby County (loan)	12	(1)
2013–2014	→ Queens Park Rangers (loan)	26	(0)
2014–2015	→ Swansea City (loan)	14	(1)
2017–2020	Swansea City	86	(3)
2018–2019	→ Aston Villa (loan)	2	(0)
2020–2021	Queens Park Rangers	22	(0)
2021–2022	Ipswich Town	14	(0)
2023–2024	Exeter City	42	(1)
2024–2025	Milton Keynes Dons	14	(0)
2025	Reading	9	(0)
Total		263	(4)

International career^{‡}
2011	England U19	1	(0)
2013–2015	England U21	17	(2)
- * Club domestic league appearances and goals as of 14:19, 6 May 2025 (UTC) ‡ National team caps and goals as of 21:40, 24 June 2015 (UTC)

Thomas James Carroll (born 28 May 1992) is an English professional footballer who plays as a midfielder, most recently for Reading.

Carroll plays as a deep-lying creative central midfielder, and is particularly valued for his high passing percentage accuracy and creativity. Carroll's style of play has drawn comparisons with former teammate Luka Modrić.

== Club career ==
Carroll attended Parmiter's School in Garston, Hertfordshire, near his home town of Watford, and he captained the school football team at district and county level. He also played for the Hertfordshire county side, before linking up with Tottenham Hotspur's Under-16 squad, winning the Legnago Tournament in Italy in 2008.

=== Tottenham Hotspur ===
In June 2010, Carroll signed a professional contract with Tottenham after scoring 10 goals in 23 games for their Academy side. He made his first senior Tottenham appearance against Heart of Midlothian in the Europa League play-off second leg on 25 August 2011, and was assigned the squad number 46. Carroll then featured in four group stage games. On 20 September 2011 he started a League Cup third round match away to Stoke City. The match finished 0–0 and went to penalties, Carroll scored his penalty, but Tottenham lost the shoot-out 7–6. Carroll's first appearance of 2012 was versus Cheltenham Town in a 3–0 FA Cup win.

On 27 January 2011, Carroll joined Leyton Orient on loan until the end of the 2010–11 season. Carroll's senior debut was in a 1–1 draw at Bournemouth on 5 February, and he totalled 14 appearances, including two games versus Arsenal in the FA Cup.

On 30 January 2012, Carroll joined Championship side Derby County on loan until the end of the 2011–12 season. He scored on his debut a day later in a 3–2 defeat at Barnsley, his first goal in competitive football. Carroll was a regular in the Derby side and played in both central midfield as well as on the right-wing due to an injury crisis. After suffering a minor injury he finished his loan spell at Pride Park with 12 league appearances.

He made his Premier League debut on 3 November 2012, replacing Kyle Walker in the 79th minute of a 1–0 defeat at home to Wigan Athletic.

At the end of the 2013 Summer transfer window, Carroll completed a loan move to Queens Park Rangers, reuniting with former manager Harry Redknapp. On 22 August 2014, Carroll signed for Swansea City on a season-long loan.

Carroll scored his first competitive goal for Tottenham on 10 December 2015 in a 4–1 win over Monaco in the Europa League. On 26 December, Carroll scored Tottenham's third goal, and his first league goal, from the bench against Norwich to help them win 3–0.

For the 2016–17 season, Carroll only played three games with Tottenham, and he moved to Swansea City in January 2017.

=== Swansea City ===
On 17 January 2017, it was announced that Swansea City had signed Carroll for a fee reported to be £4.5 million on a three-and-a-half-year deal, returning to the club after a loan spell during the course of the 2014–15 season. In his first game for Swansea City after the transfer, he helped the club to a first ever away League win at Liverpool. He scored his first goal for the club in a 2–0 vital win against Stoke City on 22 April 2017 in their bid to escape relegation.

On 31 January 2019, Carroll signed for fellow Championship club Aston Villa on loan for the rest of the season, a transfer which was received with surprise as Villa had been linked with his Swansea teammate Leroy Fer instead. He made his debut two days later as a 74th-minute substitute for Glenn Whelan in a goalless draw at Reading. Carroll only made two appearances for Aston Villa, before suffering a season-ending hip injury and returning to Swansea City on 4 April 2019.

On 11 December 2019, Carroll received his first career red card for two bookable offences, in a 1–1 draw with Blackburn Rovers.

On 31 January 2020, Swansea City announced that Carroll's contract had been terminated by mutual agreement.

=== Queens Park Rangers ===
On 4 September 2020, Carroll signed for former loan club Queens Park Rangers on a one-year deal. A day later he made his debut for the club in the first round of the EFL Cup against Plymouth Argyle which QPR lost 3–2. Carroll left the club at the end of the season upon his contract's end, despite being offered a new deal by the club.

=== Ipswich Town ===
On 16 August 2021, Carroll joined Ipswich Town on a one-year deal, becoming the club's 16th signing of the summer transfer window. He made just 17 appearances in all competitions before being released at the end of the season upon the end of his contract.

=== Exeter City ===
Carroll took a year out of football to concentrate on regaining his health and fitness, training primarily with Tottenham Hotspur throughout the 2022–23 season. Carroll went on trial at Exeter City during the pre-season of 2023. On the 20 July, it was confirmed that he had joined the League One club on a one-year deal.

=== Milton Keynes Dons ===
On 5 July 2024, Carroll joined League Two club Milton Keynes Dons on a free transfer, having declined to extend his contract with Exeter. He made his debut on 10 August 2024, in a 2–1 home defeat to Bradford City. On 3 February 2025, after limited opportunities, Carroll left the club following the mutual termination of his contract.

=== Reading ===
On 3 March 2025, Reading announced the signing of free-agent on a short-term contract until the end of the season. On 16 May 2025, after making 9 appearances for the club, Reading announced that Carroll would leave the club when his contract expired on 30 June 2025.

== International career ==
In March 2011, Carroll was called up to represent the England Under-19 team for the first time in a friendly away to the Netherlands. In November 2011, Carroll was called up to the England under-21 squad, for qualifying matches against Iceland and Belgium. He was an unused substitute in the 5–0 victory over Iceland. He made his under-21 debut on 21 March 2013, replacing Jordan Henderson in the 74th minute of a 3–0 win against Romania. He scored his first goal for England Under-21s on 13 August 2013, in a 6–0 win against Scotland.

== Career statistics ==
As of match played 3 May 2025

Appearances and goals by club, season and competition
Club	Season	League			FA Cup		League Cup		Other		Total	
Club	Season	Division	Apps	Goals	Apps	Goals	Apps	Goals	Apps	Goals	Apps	Goals
Leyton Orient (loan)	2010–11	League One	12	0	2	0	0	0	—		14	0
Tottenham Hotspur	2011–12	Premier League	0	0	1	0	1	0	5 (Note: Appearances in UEFA Europa League)	0	7	0
Tottenham Hotspur	2012–13	Premier League	7	0	1	0	2	0	4	0	14	0
Tottenham Hotspur	2013–14	Premier League	0	0	0	0	0	0	2	0	2	0
Tottenham Hotspur	2015–16	Premier League	19	1	3	1	1	0	7	1	30	3
Tottenham Hotspur	2016–17	Premier League	1	0	0	0	2	0	0	0	3	0
Tottenham Hotspur	Total		27	1	5	1	6	0	18	1	56	3
Derby County (loan)	2011–12	Championship	12	1	—		—		—		12	1
Queens Park Rangers (loan)	2013–14	Championship	26	0	0	0	0	0	—		26	0
Swansea City (loan)	2014–15	Premier League	13	0	2	1	3	0	—		18	1
Swansea City	2016–17	Premier League	17	1	0	0	—		—		17	1
Swansea City	2017–18	Premier League	37	0	7	1	1	0	—		45	1
Swansea City	2018–19	Championship	12	0	0	0	1	0	—		13	0
Swansea City	2019–20	Championship	8	0	1	0	1	0	—		10	0
Swansea City	Total		74	1	8	1	3	0	0	0	85	2
Aston Villa (loan)	2018–19	Championship	2	0	0	0	0	0	—		2	0
Queens Park Rangers	2020–21	Championship	22	0	1	0	1	0	—		24	0
Ipswich Town	2021–22	League One	14	0	1	0	0	0	2 (Note: Appearance in EFL Trophy)	0	17	0
Exeter City	2023–24	League One	42	1	0	0	2	0	1	0	45	1
Milton Keynes Dons	2024–25	League Two	14	0	0	0	1	0	1	0	16	0
Reading	2024–25	League One	9	0	0	0	0	0	0	0	9	0
Career total			267	4	19	3	16	0	22	1	322	8
