= 2009 Audi Cup =

Tournament details
- Host country: Germany
- Dates: 29 July – 30 July
- Teams: 4 (from 2 confederations)
- Venue(s): 1 (in 1 host city)

Final positions
- Champions: (Germany) Bayern Munich (1st title)
- Runners-up: (England) Manchester United
- Third place: (Argentina) Boca Juniors
- Fourth place: (Italy) Milan

Tournament statistics
- Matches played: 4
- Goals scored: 10 (2.5 per match)
- Attendance: 252,000 (63,000 per match)
- Top scorer(s): (Germany) Thomas Müller (2 goals)

The first edition of the Audi Cup was a two-day association football tournament that featured four teams, and was staged in late July 2009 at the Allianz Arena in Munich, Germany. The competition was organised and promoted by car manufacturer Audi AG to celebrate their 100th year of trading, and hosted by 2007–08 Bundesliga champions Bayern Munich. Bayern Munich defeated Manchester United in the final in a penalty shoot-out after a goalless draw. Boca Juniors defeated Milan in the third place match.

== Participating teams ==
- Bayern Munich (Germany)
- Manchester United (England)
- Boca Juniors (Argentina)
- Milan (Italy)

== Competition format ==
The competition took the format of the latter stages of a regular knock-out competition. The winners of each of the two matches on the first day compete against each other for the Audi Cup, whilst the two losing sides play in a third-place match. The draw for the 2009 Audi Cup semi-finals was made on the Audi stand at the Geneva Motor Show, on 3 March 2009. The draw was conducted by Audi representative Tom Kristensen, in the presence of an official representative from each participating team. Gennaro Gattuso (Milan), Wes Brown (Manchester United), Carlos Bianchi (Boca Juniors) and Willy Sagnol (Bayern Munich) were present on behalf of their clubs. The trophy was contested over two days, each day seeing two matches played back-to-back.

Semi-finals; 29 July
18:30
(England) Manchester United	2
(Argentina) Boca Juniors	1
20:45
(Germany) Bayern Munich	4
(Italy) Milan	1

Final; 30 July
20:45
(England) Manchester United	0 (6)
(Germany) Bayern Munich	0 (7)
Third place
18:30
(Argentina) Boca Juniors	1 (4)
(Italy) Milan	1 (3)

== Matches ==
=== Semi-finals ===
29 July 2009
18:30

Manchester United (England)	2–1	(Argentina) Boca Juniors
Anderson 23'; Valencia 42'	Report	Insúa 55'

Allianz Arena, Munich
Attendance: 61,000
Referee: Wolfgang Stark (Ergolding)

29 July 2009
20:45

Bayern Munich (Germany)	4–1	(Italy) Milan
Müller 12', 90'; Schweinsteiger 79'; Sène 89'	Report	Pirlo 81'

Allianz Arena, Munich
Attendance: 61,000
Referee: Günter Perl (Pullach)

=== Third place play-off ===
30 July 2009
18:30

Boca Juniors (Argentina)	1–1	(Italy) Milan
Viatri 87'	Report	Thiago Silva 27'
Penalties
Palermo (penalty scored); Riquelme (penalty scored); Insúa (penalty missed); Battaglia (penalty scored); Viatri (penalty scored)	4–3	(penalty scored) Ronaldinho; (penalty missed) Pirlo; (penalty scored) Jankulovski; (penalty scored) Thiago Silva; (penalty missed) Pato

Allianz Arena, Munich
Attendance: 61,000
Referee: Peter Sippel (Munich)

=== Final ===
30 July 2009
20:45

Manchester United (England)	0–0	(Germany) Bayern Munich
	Report
Penalties
Giggs (penalty scored); Anderson (penalty scored); Nani (penalty scored); Evra (penalty missed); Rooney (penalty scored); Fletcher (penalty scored); Scholes (penalty scored); Evans (penalty missed)	6–7	(penalty scored) Baumjohann; (penalty scored) Braafheid; (penalty scored) Altıntop; (penalty missed) Pranjić; (penalty scored) Sosa; (penalty scored) Ottl; (penalty scored) Badstuber; (penalty scored) Van Buyten

Allianz Arena, Munich
Attendance: 69,000
Referee: Felix Brych (Munich)

Manchester United	Bayern Munich

== Goalscorers ==
2 goals

- (Germany) Thomas Müller (Bayern Munich)

1 goal

- (Brazil) Anderson (Manchester United)
- (Argentina) Federico Insúa (Boca Juniors)
- (Italy) Andrea Pirlo (Milan)
- (Germany) Bastian Schweinsteiger (Bayern Munich)
- (France) Saër Sène (Bayern Munich)
- (Brazil) Thiago Silva (Milan)
- (Ecuador) Antonio Valencia (Manchester United)
- (Argentina) Lucas Viatri (Boca Juniors)
