= List of SSC Napoli records and statistics =

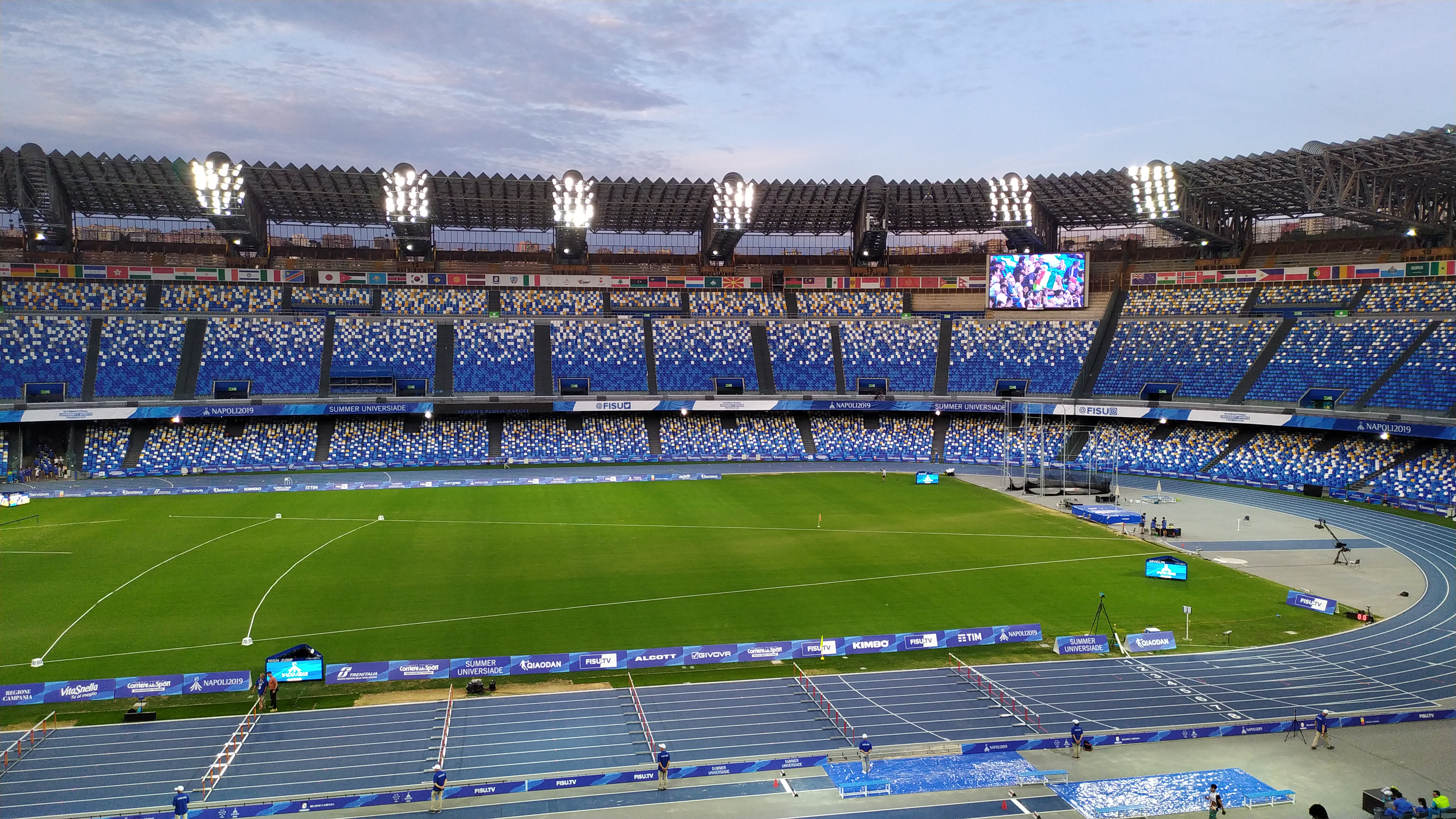
The Stadio Diego Armando Maradona, following its most recent renovations in 2018–2019.

Società Sportiva Calcio Napoli, commonly known as SSC Napoli or simply Napoli, is an Italian professional association football club based in Naples, Campania. Founded in 1926, Napoli have played their home games at the Stadio Diego Armando Maradona since 1959, which was renamed from Stadio San Paolo in 2020 following the former player's death. Napoli are among the most successful clubs in Italian football, winning the Serie A four times, the Coppa Italia six times, the Supercoppa Italiana three times, and the UEFA Cup once. They are the reigning 2025 Serie A champions.

== Honours ==
Napoli has won honours both domestically and abroad. Their first trophy came in 1962 when they defeated SPAL 2–1 in the Coppa Italia. They won their first Serie A title in the 1986–87 season, and two seasons later they won the UEFA Cup — their only European trophy to date. They have since won numerous domestic honours, including the 2022–23 and 2024–25 Serie A titles. In its history, Napoli has won the following:

=== European ===
- UEFA Cup

- Winners (1): 1988–89

- Anglo-Italian League Cup

- Winners (1): 1976

- Coppa delle Alpi

- Winners (1): 1966

=== Domestic ===
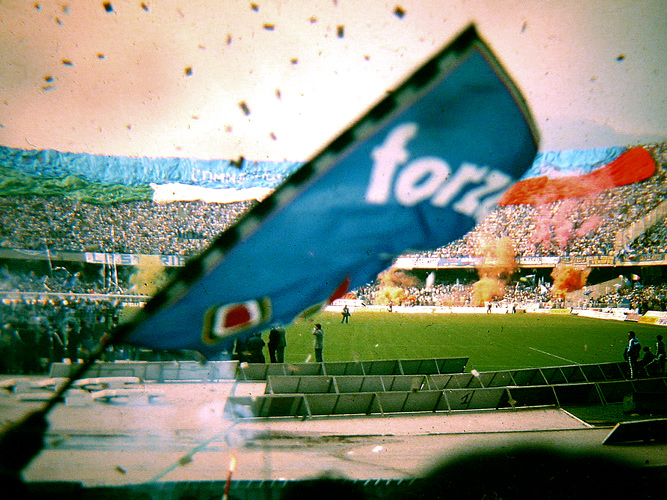
Napoli supporters celebrating the team's first league title in May 1987.

- Serie A

- Winners (4): 1986–87, 1989–90, 2022–23, 2024–25

- Coppa Italia

- Winners (6): 1961–62, 1975–76, 1986–87, 2011–12, 2013–14, 2019–20

- Supercoppa Italiana

- Winners (3): 1990, 2014, 2025–26

- Serie B

- Winners (2): 1945–46 (Serie A-B Southern Italy co-champions with Bari), 1949–50

- Serie C1

- Winners (1): 2005–06

== Divisional movements ==
Series	Years	Last	Promotions	Relegations
A	81	2026–27	–	▼6 (1942, 1948, 1961, 1963, 1998, 2001)
B	12	2006–07	▲6 (1946, 1950, 1962, 1965, 2000, 2007)	▼1 (2004)
C	2	2005–06	▲1 (2006)	never
95 years of professional football in Italy since 1929
SSC Napoli created in National Division in 1927

== Player records ==
=== Most appearances ===
Midfielder Marek Hamšík holds the record for most appearances by a Napoli player, taking the field 520 times. He also holds the record for league competitions with 408 appearances, and for UEFA competitions with 80 appearances.

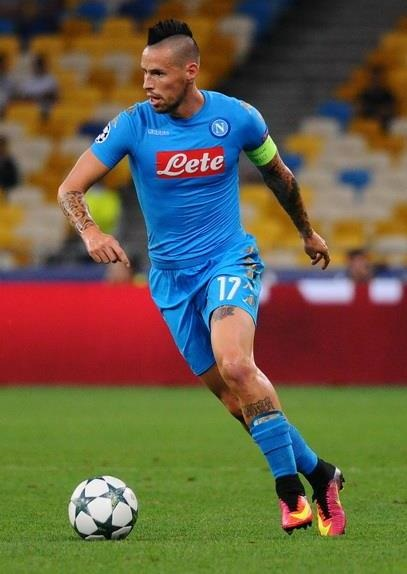
Hamšík in 2016.

As of 20 April 2024 - Competitive matches only, including substitutes.

Rank	Player	Years	League (Serie A)	Domestic cups	UEFA competitions	Other competitions	Total
1	(Slovakia) Marek Hamšík	2007–2019	408 (408)	32	80	0	520
2	(Italy) Giuseppe Bruscolotti	1972–1988	387 (387)	96	26	2	511
3	(Italy) Antonio Juliano	1962–1978	394 (355)	72	20	19	505
4	(Italy) Lorenzo Insigne	2009–2010; 2012–2022	337 (337)	23	73	1	434
5	(Belgium) Dries Mertens	2013–2022	295 (295)	23	79	0	397
6	(Italy) Moreno Ferrario	1977–1988	310 (310)	70	16	0	396
7	(Poland) Piotr Zieliński	2016–2024	281 (281)	19	64	0	364
8	(Spain) José Callejón	2013–2020	255 (255)	25	69	0	349
9	(Italy) Ciro Ferrara	1984–1994	247 (247)	47	28	0	322
10	(Senegal) Kalidou Koulibaly	2014–2022	236 (236)	17	64	0	317

Notes

1. Numbers include appearances in all domestic league tiers and in all formats. Numbers in brackets include only appearances in Serie A seasons disputed under the current single group
  round robin format.
2. Domestic cups include Coppa Italia and Supercoppa Italiana.
3. European competitions include UEFA Cup and Europa League, UEFA Champions League and European Cup, UEFA Cup Winners' Cup, UEFA Super Cup and UEFA Intertoto Cup.
4. Other competitions include Inter-Cities Fairs Cup, Mitropa Cup, Anglo-Italian League Cup, Anglo-Italian Cup and Coppa delle Alpi.

=== Goalscorers ===
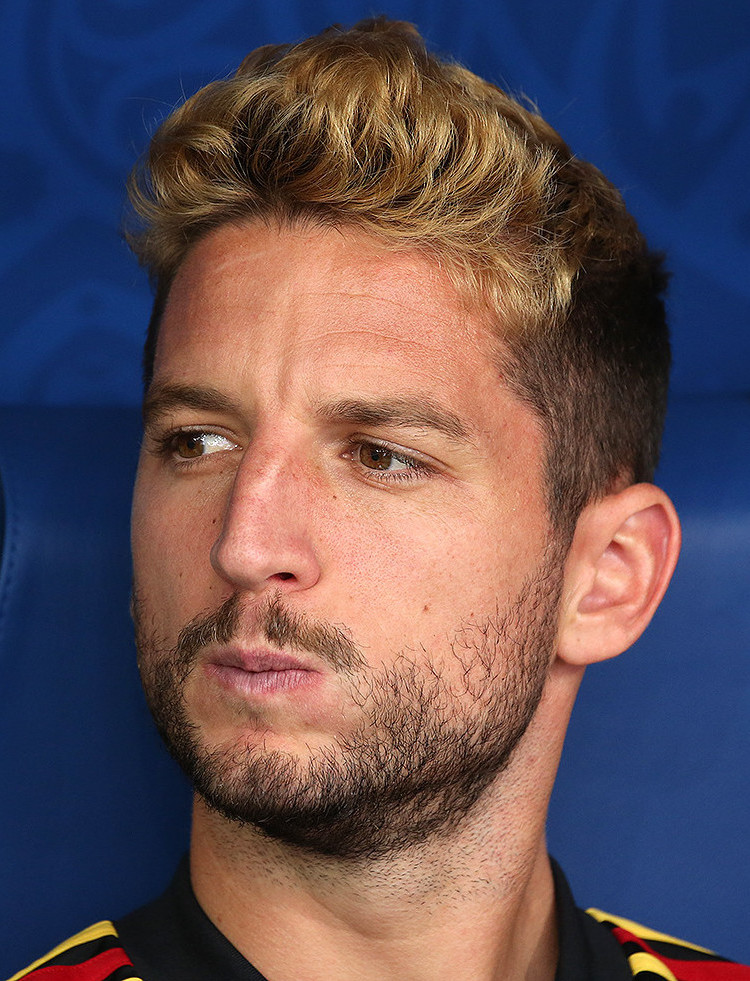
Dries Mertens, Napoli's all-time top goalscorer.

- Most goals scored in all competitions: 148, Dries Mertens
- Most goals scored in league matches: 113, Dries Mertens
- Most goals scored in Serie A: 113, Dries Mertens
- Most goals scored in Coppa Italia: 29, Diego Maradona
- Most goals scored in European competitions: 28, Dries Mertens
- Most goals scored in a season in all competitions: 38, Edinson Cavani in 2012–13 and Gonzalo Higuaín in 2015–16
- Most league goals in a Serie A season: 36, Gonzalo Higuaín in 2015–16
- Most league goals in a Serie B season: 22, Stefan Schwoch in 1999–2000.
- Most league goals in a Serie C season: 18, Emanuele Calaiò in 2004–05.
- Most goals in a competitive match: 5, Attila Sallustro against Reggiana, in the 1928–29 Divisione Nazionale, and Daniel Fonseca against Valencia, in the 1992–93 UEFA Cup.

==== Top goalscorers ====
During a Coppa Italia match against Inter Milan on 13 June 2020, Dries Mertens scored his 122nd goal for Napoli, breaking Marek Hamšík's all-time record for most goals scored by a Napoli player. Mertens would finish his career with Napoli with 148 goals, and remains the club's all-time top goalscorer to this day.

As of 31 July 2025

Competitive matches only.

Rank	Player	Years	League (Serie A)	Domestic cups	UEFA competitions	Other competitions	Total (apps)	Ratio
1	(Belgium) Dries Mertens	2013–2022	113 (113)	7	28	0	148 (397)	0.373
2	(Italy) Lorenzo Insigne	2009–2010 2012–2022	96 (96)	8	18	0	122 (434)	0.281
3	(Slovakia) Marek Hamšík	2007–2019	100 (100)	5	16	0	121 (520)	0.233
4	(Argentina) Diego Maradona	1984–1991	81 (81)	29	5	0	115 (259)	0.444
5	(Paraguay) (Italy) Attila Sallustro	1926–1937	106 (78)	1	0	1	108 (266)	0.406
6	(Uruguay) Edinson Cavani	2010–2013	78 (78)	7	19	0	104 (138)	0.754
7	(Italy) Antonio Vojak	1929–1935	102 (102)	0	0	1	103 (194)	0.531
8	(Brazil) (Italy) José Altafini	1965–1972	71 (71)	11	0	15	97 (234)	0.415
9	(Brazil) Careca	1987–1993	73 (73)	15	8	0	96 (221)	0.434
10	(Argentina) Gonzalo Higuaín	2013–2016	71 (71)	3	15	2	91 (149)	0.611
11	(Spain) José Callejón	2013–2020	64 (64)	6	12	0	82 (349)	0.235
12	(Italy) Giuseppe Savoldi	1975–1979	55 (55)	19	3	0	77 (165)	0.467
13	(Nigeria) Victor Osimhen	2020–2025	65 (65)	0	11	0	76 (133)	0.571
14	(Brazil) Luís Vinício	1955–1960	69 (69)	3	0	0	70 (155)	0.452
14	(Brazil) Cané	1962–1969 1972–1975	56 (56)	4	0	10	70 (254)	0.276

Notes

1. Numbers outside brackets refer to goals scored in all domestic league tiers and in all formats. Numbers in brackets include only goals scored in Serie A seasons disputed under the current single group round robin format.
2. Domestic cups include Coppa Italia and Supercoppa Italiana.
3. European competitions include UEFA Cup and Europa League, UEFA Champions League and European Cup, UEFA Cup Winners' Cup, European Super Cup and UEFA Intertoto Cup.
4. Other competitions include Inter-Cities Fairs Cup, Mitropa Cup, Anglo-Italian League Cup, Anglo-Italian Cup and Coppa delle Alpi.

==== International honors won while playing at Napoli ====
FIFA World Cup

The following players have won the FIFA World Cup while playing for Napoli:

- (Italy) Giuseppe Cavanna – 1934
- (Argentina) Diego Maradona – 1986

UEFA European Championship

The following players have won the UEFA European Championship while playing for Napoli:

- (Italy) Antonio Juliano – 1968
- (Italy) Dino Zoff – 1968
- (Italy) Alex Meret – 2020
- (Italy) Giovanni Di Lorenzo – 2020
- (Italy) Lorenzo Insigne – 2020

Copa América

The following players have won the Copa América while playing for Napoli:

- (Uruguay) Edinson Cavani – 2011

Africa Cup of Nations

The following players have won the Africa Cup of Nations while playing for Napoli:

- (Senegal) Kalidou Koulibaly – 2021

Olympic Games

The following players have won a gold medal in football at the Olympic Games while playing for Napoli:

- (Argentina) Ezequiel Lavezzi – 2008
- (Argentina) Nicolás Navarro – 2008

=== Record transfer fees ===
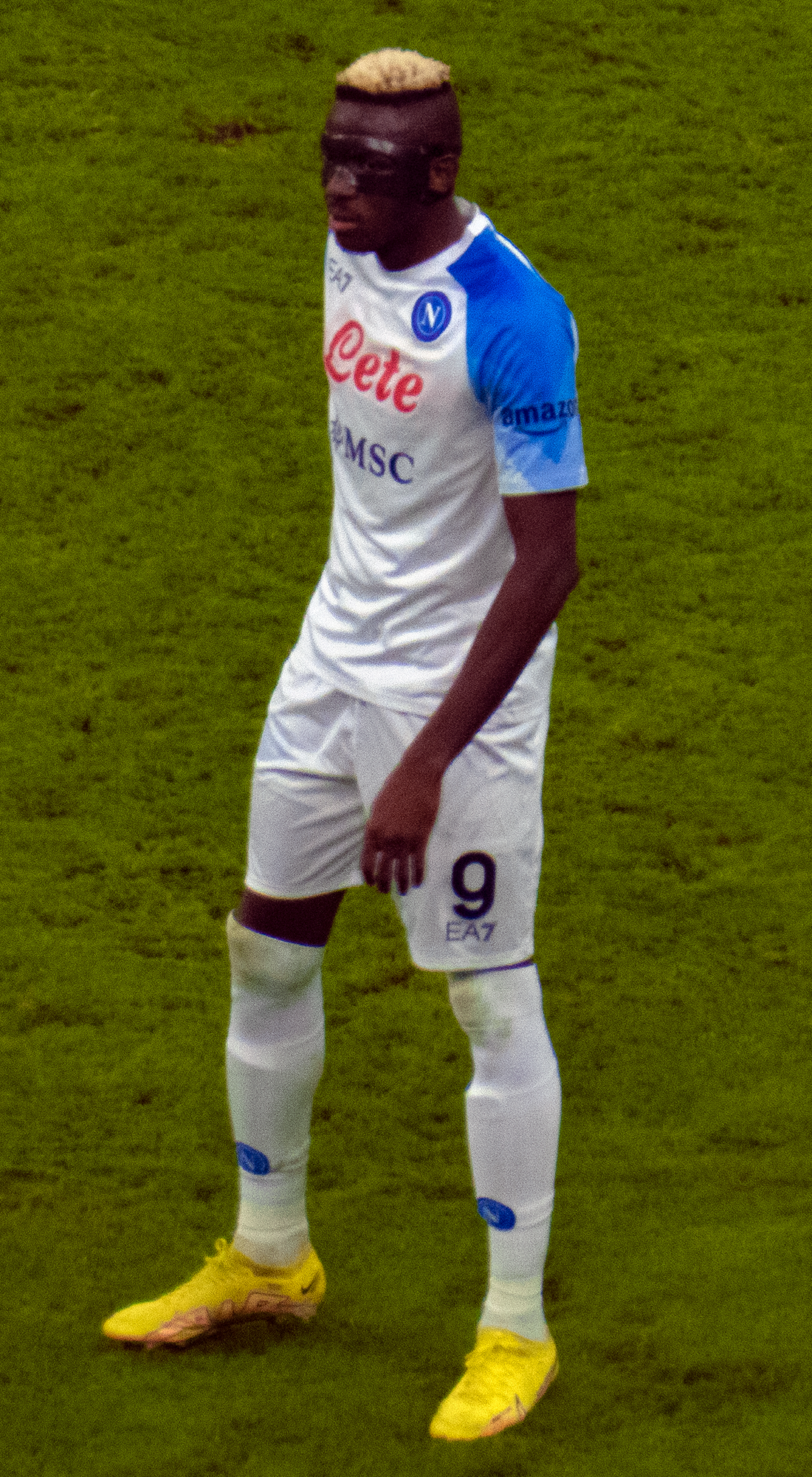
Osimhen in 2023.

The highest transfer fee paid for a player in club history was €70 million, which was paid to Lille in exchange for Victor Osimhem on 31 July 2020. Conversely, the highest transfer fee in club history ever received for a player was €90 million, when Juventus paid for Gonzalo Higuain on 27 July 2016.

== Managerial records ==
Fritz Kreutzer was Napoli's manager in the first season of the club's history. The Austrian midfielder spent one season at Napoli as a player-manager. The longest serving manager by number of matches is Eraldo Monzeglio, who managed Napoli from 1949 to 1956, for a total of 236 matches.

Competitive matches only.

Rank	Manager	Years	Matches managed
1	Bruno Pesaola	1962–1963; 1964–1968; 1976–1977	265
2	Eraldo Monzeglio	1949–1956	236
2	Ottavio Bianchi	1985–1989; 1992–1993	236
4	Walter Mazzarri	2009–2013; 2023–2024	199
5	Giuseppe Chiappella	1968–1973	189
6	Edoardo Reja	2005–2009	188
7	Luís Vinício	1973–1976; 1978–1980	176
8	William Garbutt	1929–1935	169
9	Maurizio Sarri	2015–2018	147
10	Amedeo Amadei	1956–1959; 1959–1961	146

Notes

Pesaola also co-managed Napoli in the role of Technical Director for 18 matches, which are not included in the number shown.

== Club records ==
=== Goals ===
- Most league goals scored in a season: 94 in 38 matches (2016–17)
- Fewest league goals scored in a season: 18 in 30 matches (1972–73)
- Most league goals conceded in a season: 76 in 34 matches (1997–98)
- Fewest league goals conceded in a season: 19 in 30 matches (1970–71)

=== Points ===
- Most points in a season:

Two points for a win – 51 in 34 matches (1989–90)
Three points for a win – 91 in 38 matches (2017–18)

=== Matches ===
==== Record wins ====
- Record home win:

Napoli 8–1 Pro Patria (Serie A, 16 October 1955)

- Record away win:

Bologna 1–7 Napoli (Serie A, 4 February 2017)

- Record European win:

Ajax 1–6 Napoli (Champions League, 4 October 2022)

==== Record defeats ====
- Record away defeat:

Torino 11–0 Napoli (Divisione Nazionale, 4 March 1928)
Roma 8–0 Napoli (Serie A, 29 March 1959)

=== Record consecutive results ===
- Record consecutive wins: 13 (30 April 2017 to 14 October 2017)
- Record consecutive defeats: 6 (1997–98)
- Record consecutive matches without a defeat: 19 (4 March 2017 to 26 November 2017)
- Record consecutive wins from the beginning of a league season: 8 (2017–18 and 2021–22)
