= Dries Mertens =

Belgian footballer (born 1987)

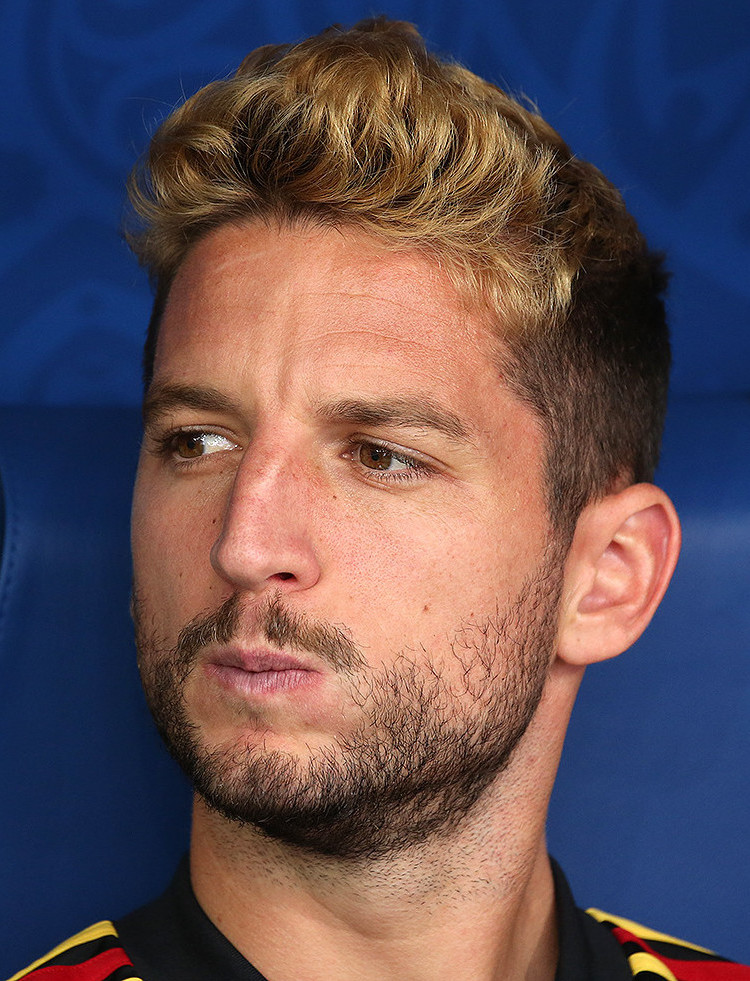
- Mertens with Belgium at the 2018 FIFA World Cup

Personal information
- Full name: Dries Mertens
- Date of birth: 6 May 1987 (age 39)
- Place of birth: Leuven, Belgium
- Height: 1.69 m (5 ft 7 in)
- Positions: Attacking midfielder; winger

Youth career
- 1996–1998: Stade Leuven
- 1998–2003: Anderlecht
- 2003–2005: Gent

Senior career*
Years	Team	Apps	(Gls)
2005–2007	Gent	0	(0)
2005–2006	→ Eendracht Aalst (loan)	14	(4)
2006–2007	→ AGOVV (loan)	35	(2)
2007–2009	AGOVV	73	(28)
2009–2011	Utrecht	69	(17)
2011–2013	PSV Eindhoven	62	(37)
2013–2022	Napoli	295	(113)
2022–2025	Galatasaray	100	(20)
Total		648	(221)

International career
2004	Belgium U17	4	(0)
2011–2022	Belgium	109	(21)
Medal record
Men’s football
Representing Belgium
FIFA World Cup
Third place	2018 Russia
- * Club domestic league appearances and goals

Dries Mertens (Dutch pronunciation: [dris ˈmɛrtəns]; born 6 May 1987) is a Belgian former professional footballer who played as an attacking midfielder or winger. He is nicknamed "Ciro".

As a youth, Mertens played for Stade Leuven, Anderlecht, and Gent, and made his debut on loan to Eendracht Aalst in the Belgian Third Division. In 2006, he moved to Dutch Eerste Divisie club AGOVV Apeldoorn, where he spent three years before moving to Utrecht of the Eredivisie. Two years later, Mertens transferred to PSV Eindhoven and won the KNVB Cup and Johan Cruyff Shield in 2012. In 2013, Mertens signed for Napoli and went on to make nearly 400 appearances for the club. He won the Coppa Italia and Supercoppa Italiana in 2014, and was named in the Serie A Team of the Year during the 2016–17 season. In 2020, Mertens scored his 122nd goal for Napoli, surpassing Marek Hamšík as the club's all-time top goalscorer. In 2022, he joined Turkish side Galatasaray, and won three consecutive Süper Lig titles before retiring in 2025.

Mertens made his senior Belgium debut in 2011, and made over 100 appearances for the national team. He was part of the nation's squads at the FIFA World Cup in 2014, 2018, and 2022, and the UEFA European Championship in 2016 and 2020, helping them to a third-place finish at the 2018 World Cup. In 2016, he was named Belgian Footballer of the Year.

== Club career ==
=== Early career ===
Born in Leuven, Mertens started his career as a boy at the now-dissolved local club Stade Leuven. It was here that the scouts of Anderlecht first spotted Mertens, ultimately resulting in him being offered a chance to join the club's youth academy in 1998. He spent five years in the youth setup at Anderlecht before being released in 2003, with coaches finding him to be too short and physically incapable of competing at a professional level. Following his release from Anderlecht, Mertens was signed by fellow Belgian Pro League side, Gent. Following two seasons in Gent's youth academy, Mertens was loaned to Eendracht Aalst for the 2005–06 season. He excelled with the third division side and was named Player of the Year. The coaching staff at Gent, much like those at Anderlecht before, remained unconvinced of Mertens given his slight frame, however, and loaned him out again the following season, this time to AGOVV Apeldoorn in the Netherlands.

=== AGOVV ===
On 1 July 2006, Mertens officially signed for AGOVV Apeldoorn, who later dissolved in 2013, on a season-long loan with the option of purchase. He managed a return of 2 goals in 35 appearances during a season which saw him become a fan favourite amongst De Blauwen supporters. Mertens's form prompted AGOVV, led by new manager John van den Brom, to exercise the option to sign the Belgian permanently the following season. It was a move that paid off for the Dutch club as Mertens ended the season having 15 goals in 38 appearances for the club.

Such was his influence that Mertens was named new club captain for the 2008–09 Eerste Divisie season. Mertens excelled in his new role and contributed a further 13 goals for the season which contributed to him being awarded the Golden Bull award for the most talented player in the Eerste Divisie. It would be his last season with the club, however, as at the end of the season he agreed to join Eredivisie side Utrecht. Mertens made 110 appearances across all competitions for AGOVV during his three seasons at the club and netted 31 goals.

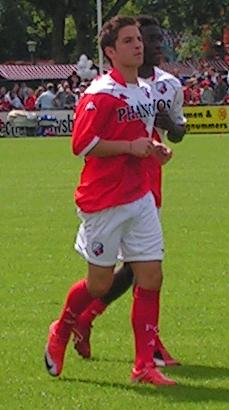
Mertens training with Utrecht in 2009

=== Utrecht ===
Having agreed a deal with AGOVV in March 2009, Utrecht officially completed the signing of Mertens at the start of the 2009–10 Eredivisie season for a €600,000 transfer fee. In his debut season with the club, Mertens netted six league goals en route to being named runner-up to Ajax's Luis Suárez for the Dutch Footballer of the Year award. He was also awarded the Di Tommaso Trophy for Utrecht's Player of the Season. He improved on his tally the following season, netting 10 goals in 31 league appearances for Utrecht, including a final day hat-trick against AZ, and a further three goals in his first experience in the UEFA Europa League. In total, Mertens scored 14 goals across all competitions and contributed 24 assists. It proved to be his last season at the club, though, as his form at the Stadion Galgenwaard caught the attention of some of the league's biggest clubs. Mertens's two-season spell in Utrecht yielded 21 goals in 86 appearances across all competitions.

=== PSV Eindhoven ===
In June 2011, it was announced that Mertens had signed for fellow Eredivisie club PSV Eindhoven as a replacement for the departing Balázs Dzsudzsák in a dual transfer with Utrecht teammate Kevin Strootman for a combined fee of €13 million. He scored on his competitive debut for the club on 7 August 2011, netting PSV's only goal in a 3–1 loss to AZ. Later that month, on 28 August, Mertens scored his first hat-trick for PSV in a 6–1 drubbing of Excelsior. Mertens's strong start to season culminated with him netting four goals in a 7–1 rout of Roda JC on 24 September 2011, meaning he had scored 11 goals in his first 7 appearances for PSV. Towards the back end of the campaign, Mertens lost a number of teeth during a collision with Heracles goalkeeper Remko Pasveer, although he managed to score during the incident. It was revealed on social media platform Twitter that Pasveer had found one of Mertens's teeth lodged in his head three weeks after the players had collided. Mertens ultimately ended the season having scored 21 goals in 33 matches, the fourth highest in the Eredivisie. He also scored three goals in four KNVB Cup matches, including a header in the final at De Kuip, Rotterdam, leading PSV to a 3–0 win over Heracles.

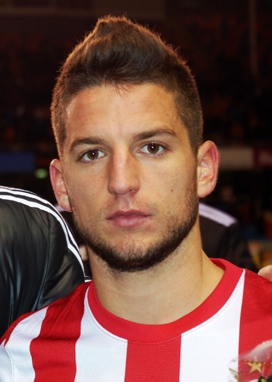
Mertens with PSV Eindhoven in 2012

Mertens added to his silverware at the start of the following season as PSV beat Ajax 4–2 to lift the Johan Cruyff Shield. On 30 September 2012, Mertens and Jürgen Locadia, who was making his Eredivisie debut, both scored hat-tricks as PSV defeated VVV-Venlo 6–0. Mertens ultimately scored 14 league goals, and 16 across all competitions as PSV ended the season as runners-up to Ajax in the Eredivisie. He also aided his side's cause with a further 17 assists. It would be his final season in the Eredivisie, however, as at the conclusion of the campaign PSV accepted an offer from Serie A side Napoli for his signature. Mertens departed Eindhoven having made 88 appearances and scored 45 goals over the course of two seasons.

=== Napoli ===
Mertens's agent Søren Lerby confirmed on 16 June 2013 that the player had agreed to sign with Napoli. He became Rafael Benítez's first signing as new Napoli manager after a reported fee of €9.5 million was agreed with PSV. He made his Serie A debut on 25 August, coming on as a second-half substitute for Marek Hamšík in a 3–0 win over Bologna. His first goal for Napoli came on 30 October when he netted the winner in a 2–1 away victory over Fiorentina. In Napoli's first game following the Serie A winter break on 6 January 2014, Mertens scored his first brace for the club in a 2–0 win over Sampdoria. He then scored Napoli's second goal in their 2–0 win over Juventus on 30 March, helping inflict only the second league defeat over the eventual champions. In the final of the Coppa Italia on 3 May, Mertens replaced Marek Hamšík in the 64th minute and went on to score in stoppage time, securing a 3–1 win over Fiorentina.

Mertens claimed another winners' medal on 22 December after Napoli's penalty shoot-out victory over Juventus in the Supercoppa. Despite being predominantly used as a substitute, he continued his fine form for Napoli over the course of the next season and a half, netting 10 goals and contributing 11 assists across all competitions in 2014–15, and 11 more goals in 2015–16. His tally in the latter campaign included a brace in Napoli's joint-largest ever winning margin in the Europa League, a 5–0 win over Belgian side Club Brugge. Mertens also scored a second-half hat-trick in a convincing 6–0 victory over Bologna on 19 April 2016.

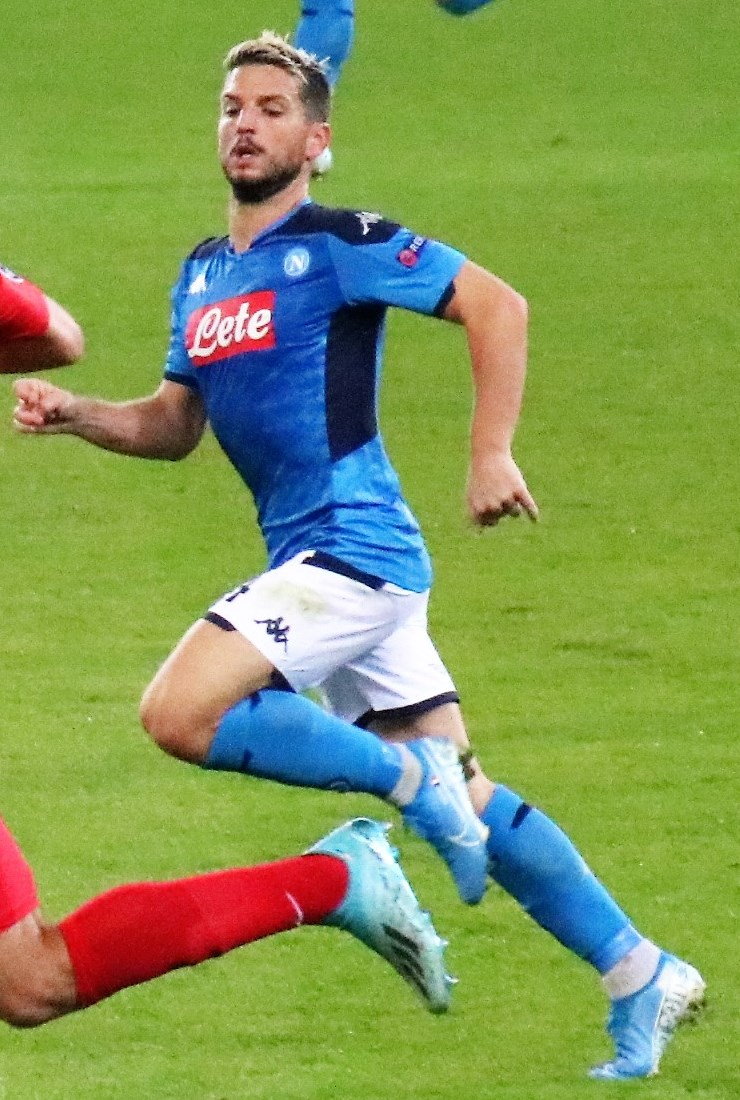
Mertens playing for Napoli in a UEFA Champions League match against Red Bull Salzburg in 2019

Following the sale of Gonzalo Higuaín – the previous season's Capocannoniere – to rivals Juventus, and a serious injury to his replacement Arkadiusz Milik, Mertens assumed a more senior role in the centre of Napoli's attack for the 2016–17 Serie A season. On 11 December, he netted a hat-trick in a 5–0 Serie A victory over Cagliari before taking it a step further in the next match by scoring four goals in a 5–3 win over Torino. Mertens's four goals, which included the fourth fastest hat-trick in Serie A history, was the first haul scored by a Napoli player since Beppe Savoldi in 1977. It also saw him become the first player to score successive league hat-tricks since Juventus's Pietro Anastasi in 1974, and the first to score seven goals across two matches since Antonio Angelillo in 1958. His form for club and country was rewarded when, on 30 December, he was named Belgian Footballer of the Year for 2016, beating Chelsea's Eden Hazard and Radja Nainggolan of Roma to the award.

On 4 February 2017, Mertens and Hamšík both scored hat-tricks in a 7–1 win over Bologna, a result which saw Napoli score seven away goals in a match for the first time in the club's history. On the final day of the season he scored his 50th league goal for Napoli, and 28th for the campaign, ultimately ending one goal behind Golden Boot winner Edin Džeko. He maintained his goal scoring form the following season during which he scored 22 goals for the campaign.

On 28 November 2018, Mertens scored his 100th goal for Napoli when he netted twice in a 3–1 UEFA Champions League win over Red Star Belgrade. He then made his 200th Serie A appearance for the club on 14 April 2019 in a 3–1 win over Chievo, marking the occasion with an assist for Kalidou Koulibaly's opening goal. On 28 April, Mertens scored in a 2–0 away win over Frosinone, which allowed him to equal Diego Maradona's tally of 81 goals in Serie A for Napoli. The following season, in October 2019, he surpassed Maradona's tally of 115 goals for the club across all competitions when he netted twice in a 3–2 Champions League win over Red Bull Salzburg, becoming the club's second-highest scorer of all time, behind Hamšík. On 25 February 2020, Mertens scored the opening goal in an eventual 1–1 home draw against Barcelona in the first leg of the round of 16 of the UEFA Champions League; with this goal, he tied Hamšík as Napoli's all-time highest goalscorer, with 121 goals. He was later substituted early in the second half due to injury. On 13 June, he scored the equalizing goal in a 1–1 home draw against Inter Milan in the second leg of 2019–20 Coppa Italia semi-final, which saw him overtake Hamšík to become Napoli's outright all-time leading goalscorer with 122 goals; the result also allowed Napoli to advanced to the Coppa Italia Final. On 17 June, he signed a two–year contract extension with the club. Later that day, he started in the Coppa Italia final against Juventus, and was later substituted for Milik in the second half; Napoli won 4–2 on penalties following a 0–0 draw after regulation time.

On 21 March 2021, Mertens scored his 99th and 100th Serie A goals for Napoli in a 2–0 win against Roma. Later that year, on 21 November, he scored his 103rd Serie A goal for Napoli in a 3–2 defeat to Inter, becoming the club's top scorer of all time in Serie A.

=== Galatasaray ===
On 8 August 2022, Mertens joined Turkish club Galatasaray on a free transfer. He clinched the Süper Lig title in the 2022–23 season with his club, defeating Ankaragücü 4–1 away in the match played in the 36th week on 30 May 2023, as they secured the 23rd league title in their history.

His second season at the club was equally successful, when on the 26 May 2024 Galatasaray achieved a 3–1 away win against Konyaspor on the final matchday of the 2023–24 season, becoming the Süper Lig champion for the 24th time with a record 102 points. Mertens performed phenomenally for his age and finished his second season as the top assist provider in the league with 18 assists, in addition to scoring 9 goals and in 35 matches.

On 3 July, Galatasaray announced that Mertens had signed a new one-year contract. Re-united with his former Napoli teammate, Victor Osimhen, Mertens and Galatasary enjoyed continued success, both in the Süper Lig and in Europe. On Matchday 7 of the Europa League, Mertens became the player with the most appearances in the competition's history. On 18 May 2025, Galatasaray secured their 25th Süper Lig title with a 3–0 win over Kayserispor, clinching the championship with two weeks to spare. They became the first and only Turkish football club to wear a fifth star on their logo. Galatasaray completed the season with 95 points on top with 30 wins, 5 draws and only 1 loss. Mertens finished the season with 6 goals and 21 assists in 52 appearances in all competitions.

With his contract due to expire, on 22 June, Mertens officially announced that he had retired from professional football, and would play for a final time in a testimonial match held in honour of former Napoli teammate Marek Hamšík.

== International career ==
=== Youth career and early senior career ===
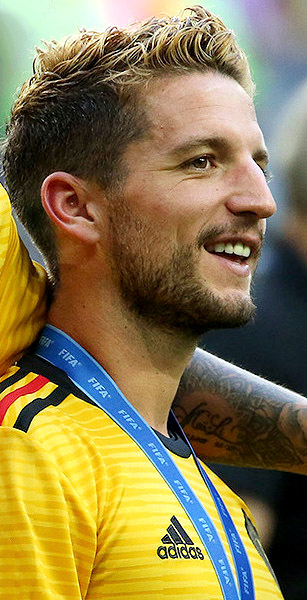
Mertens with Belgiumcelebrating winning the 2018 FIFA World Cup bronze medal following the 2–0 win over England in the third place play-off

Having previously represented Belgium at youth level, Mertens received his first senior call-up by national team coach Georges Leekens on 1 October 2010 for the nation's UEFA Euro 2012 qualifying matches against Kazakhstan and Austria. Though he never featured in either match, Mertens would make his debut on 9 February the following year in a friendly match against Finland in Ghent. He scored his first goal for Belgium on 15 August 2012 in the 125th Derby der Lage Landen. Mertens, having come on as substitute for Nacer Chadli, scored once and assisted twice, to help Belgium overcome a 2–1 deficit versus the Netherlands and win 4–2.

=== 2014 FIFA World Cup ===
Mertens was named in Marc Wilmots's 23-man squad for Belgium's 2014 FIFA World Cup campaign in Brazil on 13 May 2014. In the nation's final warm-up match for the tournament on 7 June, Mertens scored a late winner to secure a 1–0 victory over Tunisia. He made his first appearance in Belgium's opening match of the World Cup, replacing Chadli at half time and scoring a late winner in a 2–1 victory over Algeria in Belo Horizonte. Prior to the World Cup, Mertens had made a bet with his father that he would score at the tournament. After the match, he posted a photo on Instagram of him shaving his father's mustache off as reward for winning the bet. He made five appearances in total at the World Cup as Belgium were eliminated in the quarter-finals at the hands of eventual runners-up, Argentina.

=== UEFA Euro 2016 ===
Following the World Cup, Belgium embarked on their qualification campaign for Euro 2016. Mertens netted his first brace for Belgium in their opening qualifying match, netting twice in three minutes in a 6–0 win over Andorra. The following year, he scored one and assisted another in a 3–1 win over Israel which ensured that Belgium secured top spot in their qualifying group. He was later named in Belgium's squad for the tournament proper and featured in all five of the nation's matches as Belgium fell at the quarter-final stage once again, this time losing out to Wales.

=== 2018 FIFA World Cup ===
Under new manager Roberto Martínez, Mertens scored five goals in Belgium's qualification for the 2018 FIFA World Cup, including two in an 8–1 home win over Estonia on 13 November 2016. He was then selected in Belgium's tournament squad and scored in the nation's opening match in a 3–0 win over Panama. He featured interchangeably as a starter and substitute for the remainder of the tournament as Belgium ended third, defeating England in the third place play-off.

=== UEFA Euro 2020 ===
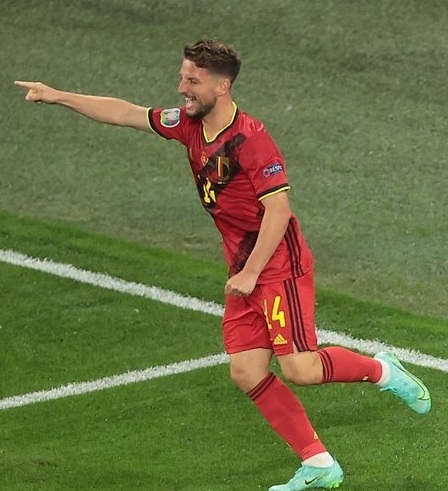
Mertens with Belgium in 2021

On 17 June 2021, Mertens played his 100th match for Belgium in a 2–1 win over Denmark during the UEFA Euro 2020.

=== 2022 FIFA World Cup ===
Mertens was part of the Belgian squad for the 2022 World Cup in Qatar, where the team performed badly, failing to make it out of the group stages. On 17 March 2023 new Belgian coach Domenico Tedesco dropped Mertens from the squad for European Championship qualifying games, citing the player's lack of match fitness.

== Style of play ==
A versatile and hard-working forward, Mertens was a fast, creative, diminutive, and agile player, with a low centre of gravity, who possessed good technique and dribbling skills, which enabled him to get past opponents when in possession of the ball. Possessing good vision, passing, shooting ability, movement off the ball, and an eye for goal, he was known for his ability both to score and create goals, and was capable of getting onto the end of passes or creating space for himself or his teammates by making attacking runs into the box. His favoured role was as a winger on the left flank, a position which allowed him to cut into the centre and strike on goal from outside the area with his stronger right foot, although he had also been capable of playing on the right, and was even used as an attacking midfielder by former manager Dick Advocaat. He was also a prolific free kick taker. During the 2016–17 season, following the departure of Gonzalo Higuaín to rivals Juventus and an injury to the club's main striker Arkadiusz Milik, Napoli coach Maurizio Sarri frequently deployed Dries Mertens either as a main striker, or in a false nine role, seemingly positioned as a lone centre-forward, rather than as a left winger, where he had previously faced competition from Lorenzo Insigne for a starting position; Sarri's tactical change was met with great results, and Mertens's goalscoring output increased dramatically as a result of this switch.

== Career statistics ==
=== Club ===
Appearances and goals by club, season and competition
Club	Season	League			National cup (Note: Includes KNVB Cup, Coppa Italia, Turkish Cup)		Europe		Other		Total	
Club	Season	Division	Apps	Goals	Apps	Goals	Apps	Goals	Apps	Goals	Apps	Goals
Eendracht Aalst (loan)	2005–06	Belgian Third Division	14	4	0	0	—		—		14	4
AGOVV Apeldoorn (loan)	2006–07	Eerste Divisie	35	2	0	0	—		—		35	2
AGOVV Apeldoorn	2007–08	Eerste Divisie	38	15	0	0	—		—		38	15
AGOVV Apeldoorn	2008–09	Eerste Divisie	35	13	2	1	—		—		37	14
AGOVV Apeldoorn	Total		108	30	2	1	—		—		110	31
Utrecht	2009–10	Eredivisie	38	7	1	0	—		—		39	7
Utrecht	2010–11	Eredivisie	31	10	4	1	12 (Note: Appearances in UEFA Europa League)	3	—		47	14
Utrecht	Total		69	17	5	1	12	3	—		86	21
PSV Eindhoven	2011–12	Eredivisie	33	21	5	3	11	3	—		49	27
PSV Eindhoven	2012–13	Eredivisie	29	16	3	1	6	1	1 (Note: Appearance in Johan Cruyff Shield)	0	39	18
PSV Eindhoven	Total		62	37	8	4	17	4	1	0	88	45
Napoli	2013–14	Serie A	33	11	4	2	10 (Note: Six appearances in UEFA Champions League, four appearances in UEFA Europa League)	0	—		47	13
Napoli	2014–15	Serie A	31	6	4	0	15 (Note: Two appearances in UEFA Champions League, thirteen appearances and four goals in UEFA Europa League)	4	1 (Note: Appearance in Supercoppa Italiana)	0	51	10
Napoli	2015–16	Serie A	33	5	2	1	5	5	—		40	11
Napoli	2016–17	Serie A	35	28	3	1	8 (Note: Appearances in UEFA Champions League)	5	—		46	34
Napoli	2017–18	Serie A	38	18	2	1	9 (Note: Eight appearances and three goals in UEFA Champions League, one appearance in UEFA Europa League)	3	—		49	22
Napoli	2018–19	Serie A	35	16	1	0	11 (Note: Six appearances and three goals in UEFA Champions League, five appearances in UEFA Europa League)	3	—		47	19
Napoli	2019–20	Serie A	31	9	3	1	8	6	—		42	16
Napoli	2020–21	Serie A	29	9	1	0	7	1	1	0	38	10
Napoli	2021–22	Serie A	30	11	1	1	6	1	—		37	13
Napoli	Total		295	113	21	7	79	28	2	0	397	148
Galatasaray	2022–23	Süper Lig	30	6	3	1	—		—		33	7
Galatasaray	2023–24	Süper Lig	36	9	1	0	13 (Note: Eleven appearances and two goals in UEFA Champions League, two appearances and one goal in UEFA Europa League)	3	1 (Note: Appearance in Turkish Super Cup)	0	51	12
Galatasaray	2024–25	Süper Lig	34	5	5	0	12 (Note: Two appearances in UEFA Champions League, ten appearances and one goal in UEFA Europa League)	1	1	0	52	6
Galatasaray	Total		100	20	9	1	25	4	2	0	136	25
Career total			648	221	45	14	133	39	5	0	831	274

=== International ===
Appearances and goals by national team and year
National team	Year	Apps	Goals
Belgium	2011	8	0
Belgium	2012	8	1
Belgium	2013	6	1
Belgium	2014	13	5
Belgium	2015	7	1
Belgium	2016	13	3
Belgium	2017	10	2
Belgium	2018	16	3
Belgium	2019	9	2
Belgium	2020	4	3
Belgium	2021	9	0
Belgium	2022	6	0
Total		109	21

International goals by date, venue, cap, opponent, score, result and competition
No.	Date	Venue	Cap	Opponent	Score	Result	Competition
1	15 August 2012	King Baudouin Stadium, Brussels, Belgium	11	Netherlands	2–2	4–2	Friendly
2	6 February 2013	Jan Breydel Stadium, Bruges, Belgium	16	Slovakia	2–1	2–1	Friendly
3	7 June 2014	King Baudouin Stadium, Brussels, Belgium	24	Tunisia	1–0	1–0	Friendly
4	17 June 2014	Mineirão, Belo Horizonte, Brazil	25	Algeria	2–1	2–1	2014 FIFA World Cup
5	4 September 2014	Stade Maurice Dufrasne, Liège, Belgium	30	Australia	1–0	2–0	Friendly
6	10 October 2014	King Baudouin Stadium, Brussels, Belgium	31	Andorra	5–0	6–0	UEFA Euro 2016 qualification
7	10 October 2014	King Baudouin Stadium, Brussels, Belgium	31	Andorra	6–0	6–0	UEFA Euro 2016 qualification
8	13 October 2015	King Baudouin Stadium, Brussels, Belgium	41	Israel	1–0	3–1	UEFA Euro 2016 qualification
9	10 October 2016	Estádio Algarve, Faro/Loulé, Portugal	52	Gibraltar	2–0	6–0	2018 FIFA World Cup qualification
10	14 November 2016	King Baudouin Stadium, Brussels, Belgium	55	Estonia	2–0	8–1	2018 FIFA World Cup qualification
11	14 November 2016	King Baudouin Stadium, Brussels, Belgium	55	Estonia	6–1	8–1	2018 FIFA World Cup qualification
12	9 June 2017	A. Le Coq Arena, Tallinn, Estonia	59	Estonia	1–0	2–0	2018 FIFA World Cup qualification
13	31 August 2017	Stade Maurice Dufrasne, Liège, Belgium	60	Gibraltar	1–0	9–0	2018 FIFA World Cup qualification
14	11 June 2018	King Baudouin Stadium, Brussels, Belgium	69	Costa Rica	1–1	4–1	Friendly
15	18 June 2018	Fisht Olympic Stadium, Sochi, Russia	70	Panama	1–0	3–0	2018 FIFA World Cup
16	16 October 2018	King Baudouin Stadium, Brussels, Belgium	78	Netherlands	1–0	1–1	Friendly
17	8 June 2019	King Baudouin Stadium, Brussels, Belgium	84	Kazakhstan	1–0	3–0	UEFA Euro 2020 qualification
18	6 September 2019	San Marino Stadium, Serravalle, San Marino	86	San Marino	2–0	4–0	UEFA Euro 2020 qualification
19	5 September 2020	Parken Stadium, Copenhagen, Denmark	91	Denmark	2–0	2–0	2020–21 UEFA Nations League A
20	8 September 2020	King Baudouin Stadium, Brussels, Belgium	92	Iceland	3–1	5–1	2020–21 UEFA Nations League A
21	15 November 2020	Den Dreef, Leuven, Belgium	93	England	2–0	2–0	2020–21 UEFA Nations League A

== Honours ==
PSV

- KNVB Cup: 2011–12
- Johan Cruyff Shield: 2012

Napoli

- Coppa Italia: 2013–14, 2019–20
- Supercoppa Italiana: 2014

Galatasaray

- Süper Lig: 2022–23, 2023–24, 2024–25
- Turkish Cup: 2024–25
- Turkish Super Cup: 2023

Individual

- Di Tommaso Trophy: 2010
- Belgian Footballer of the Year: 2016
- Serie A Team of the Year: 2016–17
- All-time topscorer of Napoli: 2020 (148 goals)
- Süper Lig top assist provider: 2023–24
- Honorary citizen of Naples, Italy: 2025

== See also ==
- List of men's footballers with 100 or more international caps
