= Attila Sallustro =

Italian footballer (1908-1983)

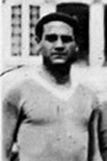
- Sallustro in 1929

Personal information
- Full name: Attila Sallustro
- Date of birth: 15 December 1908
- Place of birth: Asunción, Paraguay
- Date of death: 28 May 1983 (aged 74)
- Place of death: Rome, Italy
- Height: 1.74 m (5 ft 8 1/2 in)
- Position: Striker

Youth career
- 1920–1922: Internazionale Napoli
- 1922–1925: FBC Internaples

Senior career*
Years	Team	Apps	(Gls)
1925–1926	FBC Internaples	13	(10)
1926–1937	Napoli	258	(107)
1937–1939	Salernitana	14	(1)

International career
1929–1932	Italy	2	(1)

Managerial career
- 1939: Salernitana
- 1961: Napoli
Medal record
Italy
Central European International Cup
Silver medal – second place	1931–32 Central European International Cup
- * Club domestic league appearances and goals

Attila Sallustro (Italian pronunciation: [ˈattila salˈlustro]; 15 December 1908 – 28 May 1983) was a professional footballer who played as a striker. He is considered an important player in S.S.C. Napoli's history, and became extremely popular with the fans during his time with the club. Born in Paraguay, he played for the Italy national team.

== Early life ==
Sallustro was born in Asunción, Paraguay to Italian parents (Gaetano and Evelina), but moved to Naples in Italy, with his parents and siblings as a youngster in 1920. He came from a wealthy background and his father, wanted him to play football in Italy. He joined a football academy at the age of 12, where he drew attention of a scout who brought him to Internaples (the name of the club "Napoli" at the time).

== Club career ==
=== Napoli and Salernitana ===
Sallustro joined Napoli when they were first known as Internaples and stayed on with the club for the majority of his career. At Napoli he was nicknamed "Il Veltro" and "Il Divino". Due to his background, Sallustro chose not to take any financial pay from the club, as his father believed that it was unacceptable to earn a living in such a manner. However, he was rewarded with gifts, including a luxury motor car, a black Fiat Balilla 521. In his first season, he scored 10 goals in 13 appearances, at only 18 years of age.

At Napoli he played for 12 years, forming a strong attack alongside Antonio Vojak and Marcello Mihalich. In total, he scored 108 goals for the club in 269 appearances across all competitions, making him Napoli's fifth-highest goalscorer of all time. He served as the club's captain between 1933 and 1937. His career was halted at one point due to World War II. He had a brother two years his junior, named Oreste Sallustro (referred to sometimes as Sallustro II). The two played together at Napoli though Oreste appeared less frequently.

After retiring from football in 1939, following a two-year spell with Salernitana, he stayed in Naples until his death in 1983, serving as the director of the city's San Paolo Stadium between 1960 and 1981, Napoli's home ground, and as the club's manager in 1961.

== International career ==
Sallustro was called up in the Italy national football team twice in 1929 and scored for them once. One of the games in which he played was a 6–1 defeat of Portugal. Sallustro along with Marcello Mihalic was the first Napoli player to be called up in the Italy national team. He made one start in the silver medal 1931–32 Central European International Cup campaign, in Italy's 3–0 win against Switzerland.

Despite his goal-scoring pedigree at club level, he was kept out of the side during much of his playing days due largely to the inclusion of Giuseppe Meazza in the centre-forward role by manager Vittorio Pozzo. This was famously much to the dismay of some Neapolitans who thought his exclusion from the squad was unjust.

== Honours ==
Italy

- Central European International Cup: Runner-up: 1931–32

Sporting positions
Preceded by Paulo Innocenti	Napoli captain 1933–1937	Succeeded by Carlo Buscaglia
