= 2015–16 SSC Napoli season =

Napoli
2015–16 season
- President: Aurelio De Laurentiis
- Manager: Maurizio Sarri
- Stadium: Stadio San Paolo
- Serie A: 2nd
- Coppa Italia: Quarter-finals
- UEFA Europa League: Round of 32
- Top goalscorer: League: Gonzalo Higuaín (36); All: Gonzalo Higuaín (38)
- Highest home attendance: 56,452 vs Frosinone (15 May 2016, Serie A)
- Lowest home attendance: 7,221 vs Hellas Verona (16 December 2015, Coppa Italia)
- Average home league attendance: 38,760
Home colours	Away colours	Third colours

The 2015–16 season was Società Sportiva Calcio Napoli's 70th season in Serie A. The team competed in Serie A, the Coppa Italia, and the UEFA Europa League. In Serie A Napoli enjoyed an immense season, finishing in 2nd place and having been in 1st place for much of the mid-season period. Star striker Gonzalo Higuaín became the player with the most goals in a single season in all of Serie A history, with 36 goals, overtaking Gunnar Nordahl's long-standing record of 35. Napoli were eliminated in the quarter-finals of the Coppa Italia by Inter. In the UEFA Europa League, Napoli finished with a perfect 6–0–0 record in the group stage, scoring 22 goals in the process. However, this form did not continue into the knockout phase, where they were eliminated in the round of 32, 2–1 on aggregate by Spanish side and eventual semi-finalists Villarreal.

On 25 May 2015 coach Rafael Benítez was signed by Real Madrid to replace Carlo Ancelotti. Former Empoli manager Maurizio Sarri replaced Benítez on 12 June.

== Players ==
=== Squad information ===
As of 2 February 2016

Note: Flags indicate national team as defined under FIFA eligibility rules; some limited exceptions apply. Players may hold more than one non-FIFA nationality.

No.	Pos.	Nation	Player
1	GK	BRA	Rafael
2	DF	ALB	Elseid Hysaj
3	DF	CRO	Ivan Strinić
5	MF	BRA	Allan
6	MF	ITA	Mirko Valdifiori
7	FW	ESP	José Callejón
8	MF	ITA	Jorginho
9	FW	ARG	Gonzalo Higuaín
11	DF	ITA	Christian Maggio (vice-captain)
14	FW	BEL	Dries Mertens
17	MF	SVK	Marek Hamšík (captain)
18	DF	ITA	Vasco Regini
19	MF	ESP	David López

No.	Pos.	Nation	Player
20	MF	ITA	Jacopo Dezi
21	DF	ROU	Vlad Chiricheș
22	GK	BRA	Gabriel (on loan from Milan)
23	FW	ITA	Manolo Gabbiadini
24	FW	ITA	Lorenzo Insigne
25	GK	ESP	Pepe Reina
26	DF	SEN	Kalidou Koulibaly
31	DF	ALG	Faouzi Ghoulam
33	DF	ESP	Raúl Albiol
77	MF	MAR	Omar El Kaddouri
94	MF	ENG	Nathaniel Chalobah (on loan from Chelsea)
96	DF	ITA	Sebastiano Luperto

== Transfers ==
=== In ===
Date	Pos.	Player	Age	Moving from	Fee	Notes	Source
20 June 2015	MF	(Italy) Mirko Valdifiori	29	(Italy) Empoli	€5.5M		
23 June 2015	GK	(Spain) Pepe Reina	32	(Germany) Bayern Munich	€2M		
22 July 2015	MF	(Brazil) Allan	24	(Italy) Udinese	€12M		
30 July 2015	DF	(Romania) Vlad Chiricheș	25	(England) Tottenham Hotspur	€6.2M		
3 August 2015	DF	(Albania) Elseid Hysaj	21	(Italy) Empoli	€5M		
11 August 2015	MF	(Italy) Raffaele Maiello	24	(Italy) Crotone	€1.5M		

==== Loans in ====
Date	Pos.	Player	Age	Moving from	Fee	Notes	Source
15 July 2015	GK	(Brazil) Gabriel	22	(Italy) Milan	Loan		
1 September 2015	MF	(England) Nathaniel Chalobah	20	(England) Chelsea	Loan		

Total expenditure: €32.2 million

=== Out ===
Date	Pos.	Player	Age	Moving to	Fee	Notes	Source
3 July 2015	MF	(Uruguay) Walter Gargano	30	(Mexico) Monterrey	€1.4M		
13 July 2015	GK	(Italy) Roberto Colombo	39	(Italy) Cagliari	Free		
22 July 2015	DF	(Uruguay) Miguel Britos	30	(England) Watford	Free		
19 August 2015	MF	(Switzerland) Gökhan Inler	31	(England) Leicester City	€4.2M		
24 August 2015	FW	(Chile) Eduardo Vargas	25	(Germany) Hoffenheim	€5M		
11 January 2016	DF	(Brazil) Henrique	29	(Brazil) Fluminense	Undisclosed		

==== Loans out ====
Date	Pos.	Player	Age	Moving to	Fee	Notes	Source
28 January 2016	MF	(Netherlands) Jonathan de Guzmán	28	(Italy) Carpi			

Total revenue: €10.6 million

Net income: ▼€21.6 million

== Competitions ==
=== Overall ===
Competition	Started round	Current position	Final position	First match	Last match
Serie A	Matchday 1	—	Runners-up	23 August 2015	15 May 2016
Coppa Italia	Round of 16	—	Quarter-finals	16 December 2015	19 January 2016
Europa League	Group stage	—	Round of 32	17 September 2015	25 February 2016

Last updated: 15 May 2016

=== Serie A ===
==== League table ====
Pos	Team	Pld	W	D	L	GF	GA	GD	Pts	Qualification or relegation
1	Juventus (C)	38	29	4	5	75	20	+55	91	Qualification to Champions League group stage
2	Napoli	38	25	7	6	80	32	+48	82	Qualification to Champions League group stage
3	Roma	38	23	11	4	83	41	+42	80	Qualification to Champions League play-off round
4	Internazionale	38	20	7	11	50	38	+12	67	Qualification to Europa League group stage (Note: Since the winners of the 2015–16 Coppa Italia, Juventus, qualified for European competition based on league position, the spot awarded to the cup winners (Europa League group stage) was passed to fifth-placed team and the spot awarded to the fifth-placed team (Europa League third qualifying round) was passed to the sixth-placed team.)
5	Fiorentina	38	18	10	10	60	42	+18	64	Qualification to Europa League group stage

Source: Serie A, Soccerway
Rules for classification: 1) Points; 2) Head-to-head points; 3) Head-to-head goal difference; 4) Goal difference; 5) Goals scored; 6) Draw.
(C) Champions

==== Results summary ====
Overall								Home						Away					
Pld	W	D	L	GF	GA	GD	Pts	W	D	L	GF	GA	GD	W	D	L	GF	GA	GD
38	25	7	6	80	32	+48	82	16	3	0	49	12	+37	9	4	6	31	20	+11

Last updated: 14 May 2016.
Source: Competitive matches

==== Results by round ====
Round	1	2	3	4	5	6	7	8	9	10	11	12	13	14	15	16	17	18	19	20	21	22	23	24	25	26	27	28	29	30	31	32	33	34	35	36	37	38
Ground	A	H	A	H	A	H	A	H	A	H	A	H	A	H	A	H	A	H	A	H	A	H	A	H	A	H	A	H	A	H	A	H	A	H	A	H	A	H
Result	L	D	D	W	D	W	W	W	W	W	D	W	W	W	L	D	W	W	W	W	W	W	W	W	L	D	D	W	W	W	L	W	L	W	L	W	W	W
Position	14	14	14	11	12	10	6	4	2	2	4	4	2	1	3	3	3	3	1	1	1	1	1	1	2	2	2	2	2	2	2	2	2	2	2	2	2	2

Updated to match(es) played on 14 May 2016. Source: Competitive matches
A = Away; H = Home; W = Win; D = Draw; L = Loss

==== Matches ====
23 August 2015 1	Sassuolo	2–1	Napoli	Reggio Emilia
20:45 CEST (UTC+02:00)	Magnanelli (yellow card) 4'; Floro Flores 32'; Berardi (yellow card) 45'; Peluso (yellow card) 57'; Sansone 84', (yellow card) 86'	Report	Hamšík 3'; Chiricheș (yellow card) 18'; Valdifiori (yellow card) 39'	Stadium: Mapei Stadium – Città del Tricolore; Attendance: 13,755; Referee: Daniele Doveri

30 August 2015 2	Napoli	2–2	Sampdoria	Naples
20:45 CEST (UTC+02:00)	Higuaín 9', 39'	Report	Silvestre (yellow card) 33'; Éder 58' (pen.), 59'; Fernando (yellow card) 76'	Stadium: Stadio San Paolo; Attendance: 25,128; Referee: Andrea Gervasoni

13 September 2015 3	Empoli	2–2	Napoli	Empoli
15:00 CEST (UTC+02:00)	Saponara 3'; Pucciarelli 18'; Croce (yellow card) 45+1'; Livaja (yellow card) 71'	Report	Insigne 7'; Allan (yellow card) 40', (goal) 50'; Valdifiori (yellow card) 58'; Jorginho (yellow card) 79'; Hysaj (yellow card) 87'	Stadium: Stadio Carlo Castellani; Attendance: 9,632; Referee: Luca Banti

20 September 2015 4	Napoli	5–0	Lazio	Naples
20:45 CEST (UTC+02:00)	Higuaín 14', 59'; Allan 35'; Insigne 48'; Koulibaly (yellow card) 77'; Gabbiadini 79'	Report	Lulić (yellow card) 19'; Maurício (yellow card) 56'	Stadium: Stadio San Paolo; Attendance: 18,766; Referee: Antonio Damato

23 September 2015 5	Carpi	0–0	Napoli	Modena
20:45 CEST (UTC+02:00)	Romagnoli (yellow card) 9'; Zaccardo (yellow card) 13'; Cofie (yellow card) 77'	Report	Valdifiori (yellow card) 7'; Mertens (yellow card) 43'; Koulibaly (yellow card) 58'	Stadium: Stadio Alberto Braglia; Attendance: 9,950; Referee: Gianluca Rocchi

26 September 2015 6	Napoli	2–1	Juventus	Naples
20:45 CEST (UTC+02:00)	Insigne 26'; Ghoulam (yellow card) 50'; Callejón (yellow card) 55'; Higuaín 62'	Report	Bonucci (yellow card) 51'; Evra (yellow card) 53'; Lemina 63'; Padoin (yellow card) 87'; Morata (yellow card) 90+3'	Stadium: Stadio San Paolo; Attendance: 40,311; Referee: Daniele Orsato

4 October 2015 7	Milan	0–4	Napoli	Milan
20:45 CEST (UTC+02:00)	Bonaventura (yellow card) 32'; Antonelli (yellow card) 64'; Ely (yellow card) 66'	Report	Allan 13', (yellow card) 14'; Insigne 48', 68'; Callejón (yellow card) 61'; Ely 77' (o.g.); Jorginho (yellow card) 80'	Stadium: San Siro; Attendance: 50,488; Referee: Nicola Rizzoli

18 October 2015 8	Napoli	2–1	Fiorentina	Naples
15:00 CEST (UTC+02:00)	Jorginho (yellow card) 29'; Insigne 46'; Koulibaly (yellow card) 63'; Higuaín 75'; El Kaddouri (yellow card) 90+3'	Report	Badelj (yellow card) 25'; Astori (yellow card) 45+1'; Roncaglia (yellow card) 66'; Kalinić 73'; Gonzalo (yellow card) 87'	Stadium: Stadio San Paolo; Attendance: 49,800; Referee: Luca Banti

25 October 2015 9	Chievo	0–1	Napoli	Verona
20:45 CET (UTC+01:00)	Meggiorini (yellow card) 54'	Report	Koulibaly (yellow card) 46'; Higuaín 59'; Mertens (yellow card) 89'	Stadium: Stadio Marc'Antonio Bentegodi; Attendance: 12,000; Referee: Davide Massa

28 October 2015 10	Napoli	2–0	Palermo	Naples
20:45 CET (UTC+01:00)	Higuaín 39'; Mertens 80'	Report		Stadium: Stadio San Paolo; Attendance: 27,580; Referee: Piero Giacomelli

1 November 2015 11	Genoa	0–0	Napoli	Genoa
15:00 CET (UTC+01:00)	Izzo (yellow card) 36'; Ntcham (yellow card) 82'; Costa (yellow card) 90+1'	Report	Gabbiadini (yellow card) 85'; López (yellow card) 90+3'	Stadium: Stadio Luigi Ferraris; Attendance: 26,292; Referee: Daniele Doveri

8 November 2015 12	Napoli	1–0	Udinese	Naples
18:00 CET (UTC+01:00)	Koulibaly (yellow card) 42'; Higuaín 53'; Albiol (yellow card) 75'; El Kaddouri (yellow card) 90+4'	Report	Felipe (yellow card) 4'; Wagué (yellow card) 38'; Piris (yellow card) 57'	Stadium: Stadio San Paolo; Attendance: 36,144; Referee: Domenico Celi

22 November 2015 13	Hellas Verona	0–2	Napoli	Verona
15:00 CET (UTC+01:00)	Greco (yellow card) 6'; Pisano (yellow card) 53'; Janković (yellow card) 56'	Report	Hysaj (yellow card) 53'; Insigne (yellow card) 59', (goal) 67'; Higuaín 74'	Stadium: Stadio Marc'Antonio Bentegodi; Attendance: 17,483; Referee: Antonio Damato

30 November 2015 14	Napoli	2–1	Internazionale	Naples
21:00 CET (UTC+01:00)	Higuaín 2', 62'; Koulibaly (yellow card) 11'; Hysaj (yellow card) 36'; Allan (yellow card) 52'; Callejón (yellow card) 84'	Report	Nagatomo (yellow card) 35' (yellow-red card) 44'; Guarín (yellow card) 52'; Ljajić 67'	Stadium: Stadio San Paolo; Attendance: 54,149; Referee: Daniele Orsato

6 December 2015 15	Bologna	3–2	Napoli	Bologna
12:30 CET (UTC+01:00)	Destro 14', 60', (yellow card) 40'; Rossettini 21'; Masina (yellow card) 90+2'	Report	Allan (yellow card) 60'; Higuaín 87', 90'	Stadium: Stadio Renato Dall'Ara; Attendance: 22,334; Referee: Paolo Mazzoleni

13 December 2015 16	Napoli	0–0	Roma	Naples
18:00 CET (UTC+01:00)	Albiol (yellow card) 59'; Mertens (yellow card) 71'	Report	Gyömbér (yellow card) 90'; Nainggolan (yellow card) 90+1'; De Rossi (yellow card) 90+3'	Stadium: Stadio San Paolo; Attendance: 55,726; Referee: Nicola Rizzoli

20 December 2015 17	Atalanta	1–3	Napoli	Bergamo
15:00 CET (UTC+01:00)	Gómez 54'; Cigarini (yellow card) 80'; Paletta (red card) 90+1'	Report	Koulibaly (yellow card) 42'; Hamšík 52' (pen.); Higuaín 62', 85'; Jorginho (yellow card) 71' (yellow-red card) 74'	Stadium: Stadio Atleti Azzurri d'Italia; Attendance: 17,134; Referee: Gianluca Rocchi

6 January 2016 18	Napoli	2–1	Torino	Naples
20:45 CET (UTC+01:00)	Higuaín (yellow card) 6'; Insigne 16'; Hamšík 41'; Albiol (yellow card) 86'	Report	Acquah (yellow card) 2'; Quagliarella 33' (pen.); Baselli (yellow card) 47'; Glik (yellow card) 59'; Bovo (yellow card) 72'	Stadium: Stadio San Paolo; Attendance: 33,326; Referee: Marco Di Bello

10 January 2016 19	Frosinone	1–5	Napoli	Frosinone
15:00 CET (UTC+01:00)	Dionisi (yellow card) 21'; Blanchard (yellow card) 32'; Sammarco 81'	Report	Albiol 20'; Higuaín 30' (pen.), 60'; Hysaj (yellow card) 51'; Hamšík 59'; Gabbiadini 71'	Stadium: Stadio Matusa; Attendance: 7,954; Referee: Paolo Tagliavento

16 January 2016 20	Napoli	3–1	Sassuolo	Naples
20:45 CET (UTC+01:00)	Callejón 19'; Higuaín 42', 90+3'	Report	Falcinelli 3' (pen.); Acerbi (yellow card) 88'	Stadium: Stadio San Paolo; Attendance: 40,047; Referee: Piero Giacomelli

24 January 2016 21	Sampdoria	2–4	Napoli	Genoa
15:00 CET (UTC+01:00)	Cassani (yellow card) 27' (yellow-red card) 59'; Correa 45'; Fernando (yellow card) 45+2'; Éder 73'	Report	Higuaín 9'; Jorginho (yellow card) 13'; Insigne 18' (pen.); Hamšík 60'; Mertens 79'	Stadium: Stadio Luigi Ferraris; Attendance: 22,635; Referee: Daniele Orsato

31 January 2016 22	Napoli	5–1	Empoli	Naples
15:00 CET (UTC+01:00)	Higuaín 33'; Reina (yellow card) 34'; Insigne 37'; Hysaj (yellow card) 39'; Allan (yellow card) 45'; Camporese 51' (o.g.); Callejón 83', 88'	Report	Paredes 28'; Zieliński (yellow card) 36'; Tonelli (yellow card) 50'; Büchel (yellow card) 79'	Stadium: Stadio San Paolo; Attendance: 39,986; Referee: Davide Massa

3 February 2016 23	Lazio	0–2	Napoli	Rome
15:00 CET (UTC+01:00)	Lulić (yellow card) 38'; Hoedt (yellow card) 57'; Maurício (yellow card) 73'; Keita (yellow card) 90+4'	Report	Higuaín 24'; Callejón 27'; Koulibaly (yellow card) 87'; Jorginho (yellow card) 90+2'	Stadium: Stadio Olimpico; Attendance: 20,189; Referee: Massimiliano Irrati

7 February 2016 24	Napoli	1–0	Carpi	Naples
15:00 CET (UTC+01:00)	Albiol (yellow card) 44'; Higuaín 69' (pen.)	Report	Crimi (yellow card) 35'; Bianco (yellow card) 45+2' (yellow-red card) 56'; Poli (yellow card) 51'; Martinho (yellow card) 54'; Romagnoli (yellow card) 89'	Stadium: Stadio San Paolo; Attendance: 37,274; Referee: Daniele Doveri

13 February 2016 25	Juventus	1–0	Napoli	Turin
20:45 CET (UTC+01:00)	Pogba (yellow card) 67'; Marchisio (yellow card) 86'; Zaza 88'	Report	Callejón (yellow card) 63'; Mertens (yellow card) 90+4'	Stadium: Juventus Stadium; Attendance: 41,305; Referee: Daniele Orsato

22 February 2016 26	Napoli	1–1	Milan	Naples
21:00 CET (UTC+01:00)	Insigne 39'	Report	Bonaventura 44'; Donnarumma (yellow card) 53'; Montolivo (yellow card) 66'	Stadium: Stadio San Paolo; Attendance: 54,758; Referee: Luca Banti

29 February 2016 27	Fiorentina	1–1	Napoli	Florence
21:00 CET (UTC+01:00)	Alonso 6'	Report	Higuaín 7'; Albiol (yellow card) 53'	Stadium: Stadio Artemio Franchi; Attendance: 31,469; Referee: Paolo Tagliavento

5 March 2016 28	Napoli	3–1	Chievo	Naples
20:45 CET (UTC+01:00)	Higuaín 6'; Chiricheș 38'; Callejón 70'	Report	Rigoni 2'; Castro (yellow card) 11'; Cesar (yellow card) 58'; Meggiorini (yellow card) 82'	Stadium: Stadio San Paolo; Attendance: 33,239; Referee: Marco Di Bello

13 March 2016 29	Palermo	0–1	Napoli	Palermo
20:45 CET (UTC+01:00)	Chochev (yellow card) 52'; Quaison (yellow card) 84'	Report	Higuaín 23' (pen.); Albiol (yellow card) 75'; López (yellow card) 90+4'	Stadium: Stadio Renzo Barbera; Attendance: 14,628; Referee: Gianluca Rocchi

20 March 2016 30	Napoli	3–1	Genoa	Naples
18:00 CET (UTC+01:00)	Koulibaly (yellow card) 31'; Jorginho (yellow card) 36'; Insigne (yellow card) 45+3'; Higuaín 51', 81'; El Kaddouri 90+1'	Report	Rincón 10'; Fiamozzi (yellow card) 44'; Džemaili (yellow card) 89'	Stadium: Stadio San Paolo; Attendance: 43,917; Referee: Andrea Gervasoni

3 April 2016 31	Udinese	3–1	Napoli	Udine
12:30 CEST (UTC+02:00)	Fernandes 14' (pen.), 45+1', (yellow card) 79'; Heurtaux (yellow card) 23'; Kuzmanović (yellow card) 38'; Théréau 57'; Widmer (yellow card) 80'	Report	Koulibaly (yellow card) 13'; Higuaín 24', (yellow card) 61' (yellow-red card) 75'; Ghoulam (yellow card) 25'; Jorginho (yellow card) 62'; Mertens (yellow card) 83'	Stadium: Stadio Friuli; Attendance: 20,162; Referee: Massimiliano Irrati

10 April 2016 32	Napoli	3–0	Hellas Verona	Naples
15:00 CEST (UTC+02:00)	Albiol (yellow card) 23'; Gabbiadini 33'; Insigne 45+2' (pen.); Chiricheș (yellow card) 61'; Callejón 70'	Report	Samir (yellow card) 21'; Bianchetti (yellow card) 39'; Souprayen (red card) 45'	Stadium: Stadio San Paolo; Attendance: 42,784; Referee: Domenico Celi

16 April 2016 33	Internazionale	2–0	Napoli	Milan
20:45 CEST (UTC+02:00)	Icardi 4'; Nagatomo (yellow card) 14'; Murillo (yellow card) 33'; Perišić (yellow card) 42'; Brozović 44'; Kondogbia (yellow card) 62'	Report	Jorginho (yellow card) 22'; Albiol (yellow card) 55'; Mertens (yellow card) 73'	Stadium: San Siro; Attendance: 59,310; Referee: Gianluca Rocchi

19 April 2016 34	Napoli	6–0	Bologna	Naples
20:45 CEST (UTC+02:00)	Gabbiadini 10', 35' (pen.); Mertens 58', 80', 88'; Albiol (yellow card) 74'; López 89'	Report	Mbaye (yellow card) 37'; Diawara (yellow card) 53'	Stadium: Stadio San Paolo; Attendance: 22,533; Referee: Andrea Gervasoni

25 April 2016 35	Roma	1–0	Napoli	Rome
15:00 CEST (UTC+02:00)	Pjanić (yellow card) 38'; Rüdiger (yellow card) 47'; Nainggolan 89'	Report	Koulibaly (yellow card) 41'; Ghoulam (yellow card) 41'; Mertens (yellow card) 70'; Jorginho (yellow card) 74'	Stadium: Stadio Olimpico; Attendance: 35,273; Referee: Daniele Orsato

2 May 2016 36	Napoli	2–1	Atalanta	Naples
21:00 CEST (UTC+02:00)	Higuaín 10', 77'	Report	Masiello (yellow card) 62'; Djimsiti (yellow card) 68'; Albiol 85' (o.g.)	Stadium: Stadio San Paolo; Attendance: 24,514; Referee: Piero Giacomelli

8 May 2016 37	Torino	1–2	Napoli	Turin
20:45 CEST (UTC+02:00)	Vives (yellow card) 39' (yellow-red card) 90+2'; Bovo (yellow card) 60'; Jansson (yellow card) 63'; Peres 66'; Benassi (yellow card) 82'	Report	Albiol (yellow card) 3'; Higuaín 12'; Callejón 20'	Stadium: Stadio Olimpico Grande Torino; Attendance: 23,095; Referee: Antonio Damato
Note: On 24 April Torino announced that the Stadio Olimpico di Torino would be renamed the Stadio Olimpico Grande Torino, in honour of the Grande Torino team of the 1940s.

14 May 2016 38	Napoli	4–0	Frosinone	Naples
15:00 CEST (UTC+02:00)	Jorginho (yellow card) 33'; Hamšík 44'; Higuaín 52', 62', 71'	Report	Gori (red card) 13'; Crivello (yellow card) 14'	Stadium: Stadio San Paolo; Attendance: 56,452; Referee: Domenico Celi

=== Coppa Italia ===
16 December 2015 Round of 16	Napoli	3–0	Hellas Verona	Naples
19:00 CET (UTC+01:00)	El Kaddouri 4'; Mertens 12'; Callejón 75'	Report		Stadium: Stadio San Paolo; Attendance: 7,221; Referee: Massimiliano Irrati

19 January 2016 Quarter-finals	Napoli	0–2	Internazionale	Naples
20:45 CET (UTC+01:00)	Valdifiori (yellow card) 71'; Mertens (yellow card) 79' (yellow-red card) 88'; Higuaín (yellow card) 80'	Report	Miranda (yellow card) 47'; Jovetić 74'; Ljajić 90+2'	Stadium: Stadio San Paolo; Attendance: 25,968; Referee: Paolo Valeri

=== UEFA Europa League ===
==== Group stage ====
Pos	Team	Pld	W	D	L	GF	GA	GD	Pts	Qualification	NAP	MID	BRU	LEG
1	(Italy) Napoli	6	6	0	0	22	3	+19	18	Advance to knockout phase	—	5–0	5–0	5–2
2	(Denmark) Midtjylland	6	2	1	3	6	12	−6	7	Advance to knockout phase	1–4	—	1–1	1–0
3	(Belgium) Club Brugge	6	1	2	3	4	11	−7	5		0–1	1–3	—	1–0
4	(Poland) Legia Warsaw	6	1	1	4	4	10	−6	4		0–2	1–0	1–1	—

Source: Soccerway
Rules for classification: Group stage tiebreakers

17 September 2015 1	Napoli (Italy)	5–0	(Belgium) Club Brugge	Naples, Italy
19:00 CEST (UTC+02:00)	Callejón 5', 77'; Mertens 19', 25'; Hamšík 53'	Report	Simons (yellow card) 90'	Stadium: Stadio San Paolo; Attendance: 13,043; Referee: István Vad (Hungary)

1 October 2015 2	Legia Warsaw (Poland)	0–2	(Italy) Napoli	Warsaw, Poland
21:05 CEST (UTC+02:00)	Rzeźniczak (yellow card) 44'	Report	Mertens 53'; Higuaín 84'	Stadium: Polish Army Stadium; Attendance: 26,357; Referee: Michael Koukoulakis (Greece)

22 October 2015 3	Midtjylland (Denmark)	1–4	(Italy) Napoli	Herning, Denmark
21:05 CEST (UTC+02:00)	Pušić 43'	Report	Callejón 19'; Gabbiadini 31', 40'; Koulibaly (yellow card) 83'; Higuaín 90+4'	Stadium: MCH Arena; Attendance: 9,210; Referee: Serdar Gözübüyük (Netherlands)

5 November 2015 4	Napoli (Italy)	5–0	(Denmark) Midtjylland	Naples, Italy
19:00 CET (UTC+01:00)	El Kaddouri 13'; Gabbiadini 23', 38'; Maggio 54'; Callejón 77'; López (yellow card) 83'	Report		Stadium: Stadio San Paolo; Attendance: 18,475; Referee: Benoît Bastien (France)

26 November 2015 5	Club Brugge (Belgium)	0–1	(Italy) Napoli	Bruges, Belgium
21:05 CET (UTC+01:00)	Izquierdo (yellow card) 23'; Denswil (yellow card) 66'	Report	López (yellow card) 37'; Maggio (yellow card) 38'; Chiricheș 41'	Stadium: Jan Breydel Stadium; Attendance: 0 Referee: Marius Avram (Romania)
Note: The match was played behind closed doors due to the security situation in Belgium in the aftermath of the November 2015 Paris attacks.

10 December 2015 6	Napoli (Italy)	5–2	(Poland) Legia Warsaw	Naples, Italy
19:00 CET (UTC+01:00)	Chalobah 32', (yellow card) 89'; Insigne 39'; Strinić (yellow card) 55'; Callejón 57'; Mertens 65', 90+1'	Report	Vranješ 62'; Prijović 90+2'	Stadium: Stadio San Paolo; Attendance: 7,922; Referee: Aleksandar Stavrev (Macedonia)

==== Knockout phase ====
===== Round of 32 =====
18 February 2016 First leg	Villarreal (Spain)	1–0	(Italy) Napoli	Villarreal, Spain
19:00 CET (UTC+01:00)	Suárez 82'; Musacchio (yellow card) 86'; Soldado (yellow card) 90+1'	Report	Valdifiori (yellow card) 38'; Callejón (yellow card) 67'; Insigne (yellow card) 83'	Stadium: El Madrigal; Attendance: 17,686; Referee: Bas Nijhuis (Netherlands)

25 February 2016 Second leg	Napoli (Italy)	1–1 (1–2 agg.)	(Spain) Villarreal	Naples, Italy
21:05 CET (UTC+01:00)	Hamšík 17', (yellow card) 25'; López (yellow card) 33'; Jorginho (yellow card) 83'	Report	Rukavina (yellow card) 25'; Bruno (yellow card) 36'; Pina 59'	Stadium: Stadio San Paolo; Attendance: 23,928; Referee: Deniz Aytekin (Germany)

== Statistics ==
=== Appearances and goals ===
No.	Pos	Nat	Player	Total		Serie A		Coppa Italia		Europa League	
No.	Pos	Nat	Player	Apps	Goals	Apps	Goals	Apps	Goals	Apps	Goals
Goalkeepers
1	GK	(Brazil) BRA	Rafael	0	0	0	0	0	0	0	0
22	GK	(Brazil) BRA	Gabriel	4	0	1	0	0	0	3	0
25	GK	(Spain) ESP	Pepe Reina	44	0	37	0	2	0	5	0
Defenders
2	DF	(Albania) ALB	Elseid Hysaj	43	0	37	0	1	0	3+2	0
3	DF	(Croatia) CRO	Ivan Strinić	13	0	3+2	0	2	0	5+1	0
11	DF	(Italy) ITA	Christian Maggio	15	1	4+4	0	1	0	5+1	1
18	DF	(Italy) ITA	Vasco Regini	1	0	0+1	0	0	0	0	0
21	DF	(Romania) ROU	Vlad Chiricheș	17	2	8	1	2	0	7	1
26	DF	(Senegal) SEN	Kalidou Koulibaly	42	0	32+1	0	2	0	7	0
31	DF	(Algeria) ALG	Faouzi Ghoulam	38	0	32+2	0	0	0	3+1	0
33	DF	(Spain) ESP	Raúl Albiol	39	1	36	1	0	0	2+1	0
96	DF	(Italy) ITA	Sebastiano Luperto	1	0	0	0	0	0	0+1	0
Midfielders
5	MF	(Brazil) BRA	Allan	43	3	32+3	3	2	0	2+4	0
6	MF	(Italy) ITA	Mirko Valdifiori	15	0	6	0	2	0	7	0
8	MF	(Italy) ITA	Jorginho	38	0	32+3	0	0+1	0	1+1	0
17	MF	(Slovakia) SVK	Marek Hamšík	46	8	38	6	0+2	0	5+1	2
19	MF	(Spain) ESP	David López	35	1	6+19	1	2	0	8	0
20	MF	(Italy) ITA	Jacopo Dezi	0	0	0	0	0	0	0	0
77	MF	(Morocco) MAR	Omar El Kaddouri	26	3	0+20	1	1	1	4+1	1
88	MF	(Italy) ITA	Alberto Grassi	0	0	0	0	0	0	0	0
94	MF	(England) ENG	Nathaniel Chalobah	9	1	0+5	0	0+1	0	2+1	1
Forwards
7	FW	(Spain) ESP	José Callejón	47	13	35+3	7	1+1	1	5+2	5
9	FW	(Argentina) ARG	Gonzalo Higuaín	42	38	35	36	1+1	0	2+3	2
14	FW	(Belgium) BEL	Dries Mertens	40	11	6+27	5	2	1	5	5
23	FW	(Italy) ITA	Manolo Gabbiadini	30	9	4+19	5	1	0	4+2	4
24	FW	(Italy) ITA	Lorenzo Insigne	42	13	34+3	12	0	0	3+2	1
Players transferred out during the season

Last updated: 14 May 2016
Source: Competitions

=== Goalscorers ===
Rank	No.	Pos	Nat	Name	Serie A	Coppa Italia	UEFA EL	Total
1	9	FW	(Argentina)	Gonzalo Higuaín	36	0	2	38
2	7	FW	(Spain)	José Callejón	7	1	5	13
2	24	FW	(Italy)	Lorenzo Insigne	12	0	1	13
4	14	FW	(Belgium)	Dries Mertens	5	1	5	11
5	23	FW	(Italy)	Manolo Gabbiadini	5	0	4	9
6	17	MF	(Slovakia)	Marek Hamšík	6	0	2	8
7	5	MF	(Brazil)	Allan	3	0	0	3
7	77	MF	(Morocco)	Omar El Kaddouri	1	1	1	3
9	21	DF	(Romania)	Vlad Chiricheș	1	0	1	2
10	11	DF	(Italy)	Christian Maggio	0	0	1	1
10	19	MF	(Spain)	David López	1	0	0	1
10	33	DF	(Spain)	Raúl Albiol	1	0	0	1
10	94	MF	(England)	Nathaniel Chalobah	0	0	1	1
Own goal					2	0	0	2
Totals					80	3	23	106

Last updated: 14 May 2016

=== Clean sheets ===
Rank	No.	Pos	Nat	Name	Serie A	Coppa Italia	UEFA EL	Total
1	25	GK	(Spain)	Pepe Reina	15	1	2	18
2	22	GK	(Brazil)	Gabriel	0	0	2	2
Totals					15	1	4	20

Last updated: 14 May 2016
