= Marek Hamšík =

Slovak footballer (born 1987)

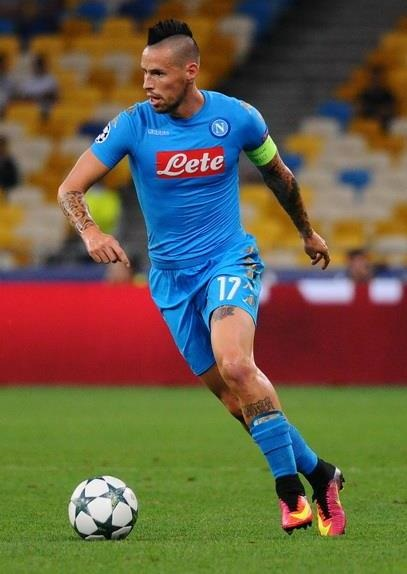
- Hamšík playing for Napoli in 2016

Personal information
- Full name: Marek Hamšík
- Date of birth: 27 July 1987 (age 39)
- Place of birth: Banská Bystrica, Czechoslovakia
- Height: 1.83 m (6 ft 0 in)
- Position: Midfielder

Team information
- Current team: Slovakia (assistant)

Youth career
- 2001–2002: Jupie Podlavice
- 2002–2004: Slovan Bratislava

Senior career*
Years	Team	Apps	(Gls)
2004	Slovan Bratislava	6	(1)
2004–2007	Brescia	65	(10)
2007–2019	Napoli	408	(100)
2019–2021	Dalian Professional	42	(4)
2021	IFK Göteborg	6	(1)
2021–2023	Trabzonspor	49	(5)
2025	RSC Hamsik Academy	2	(0)
Total		578	(121)

International career
2003–2004	Slovakia U17	6	(3)
2005–2006	Slovakia U19	6	(1)
2006–2007	Slovakia U21	2	(0)
2007–2023	Slovakia	138	(26)

Managerial career
- 2023–: Slovakia (assistant)
- * Club domestic league appearances and goals

Marek Hamšík (Slovak pronunciation: [ˈmareɡ ˈɦamʂiːk]; born 27 July 1987) is a Slovak professional football coach and former player who played as a midfielder. He is currently the team manager and assistant coach for the Slovakia national team. Hamšík is best known for his 12-year long tenure at Serie A club Napoli, where he became the club's all-time top goalscorer (until 2020) with 121 goals and played a club record 521 matches in all competitions. He also served as the club's captain from 2014 to 2019. With 138 caps and 26 goals at senior international level, Hamšík is both Slovakia's most capped player and all-time top scorer.

After beginning his club career with Slovan Bratislava in 2004, Hamšík moved to Italian club Brescia later that year. In 2007, he was purchased by newly promoted Serie A club Napoli, where he became a mainstay in the squad's starting line-up. His energy, leadership, creativity, skill and eye for goal from midfield saw him play a key role in helping the team to two Coppa Italia titles and a Supercoppa Italiana. He was also involved in Napoli finishing second in Serie A in 2012–13 and 2018–19, while engaging in title races with Juventus in 2015–16 and 2017–18, when they again finished runners-up. In February 2019, Hamšík joined Chinese club Dalian Professional. He signed for Turkish side Trabzonspor in 2021, winning the Süper Lig title in his first season, before announcing his retirement in 2023.

At international level, Hamšík played for the Slovakia national team from 2007 until 2023. He helped Slovakia qualify for the country's first ever FIFA World Cup, captaining the side at the 2010 tournament as they reached the round of 16 following a victory over defending champions Italy. He went on to lead his nation to European Championship qualification for the first time in 2016, as they once again reached the second round of a major tournament; a second consecutive European Championship appearance followed for Hamšík in 2020.

For his performances, Hamšík also won several individual awards: he is an eight-time winner of the Slovak Footballer of the Year Award, and he was named 2008 Serie A Young Footballer of the Year. In 2011, 2016 and 2017, he was named in the Serie A Team of the Year, and in 2015, he was included in the UEFA Europa League Squad of the season. In 2013, Hamšík was ranked as the eighth best footballer in Europe by Bloomberg.

== Club career ==
=== Early career ===
Despite the fact Hamšík grew up in Banská Bystrica, he never played for major local team Dukla Banská Bystrica. Instead, he began playing for a small youth team, Jupie Podlavice. In 2002, he signed with top Slovak club Slovan Bratislava. He played six times for the Slovan Bratislava first team and scored one goal. In August 2004, he scored his only senior goal for Slovan Bratislava with an injury-time header in a 4–1 Second League win against Tatran Prešov in front of a crowd of 1,480.

In 2004, at age 17, Hamšík joined Italian Serie A club Brescia on a five-year contract for a €500,000 transfer fee. He made his Brescia debut in a 3–1 away defeat against Chievo on 20 March 2005, when he was 17 years and 237 days old. He became the third Slovak footballer to play in Serie A after Miloš Glonek and Vratislav Greško. Brescia finished the 2004–05 Serie A season in 19th place and were subsequently relegated to Serie B. In 2005–06, he played 24 league matches for Brescia, with Brescia finishing tenth. He had an impressive 2006–07 season, scoring 10 goals in 40 matches.

=== Napoli ===
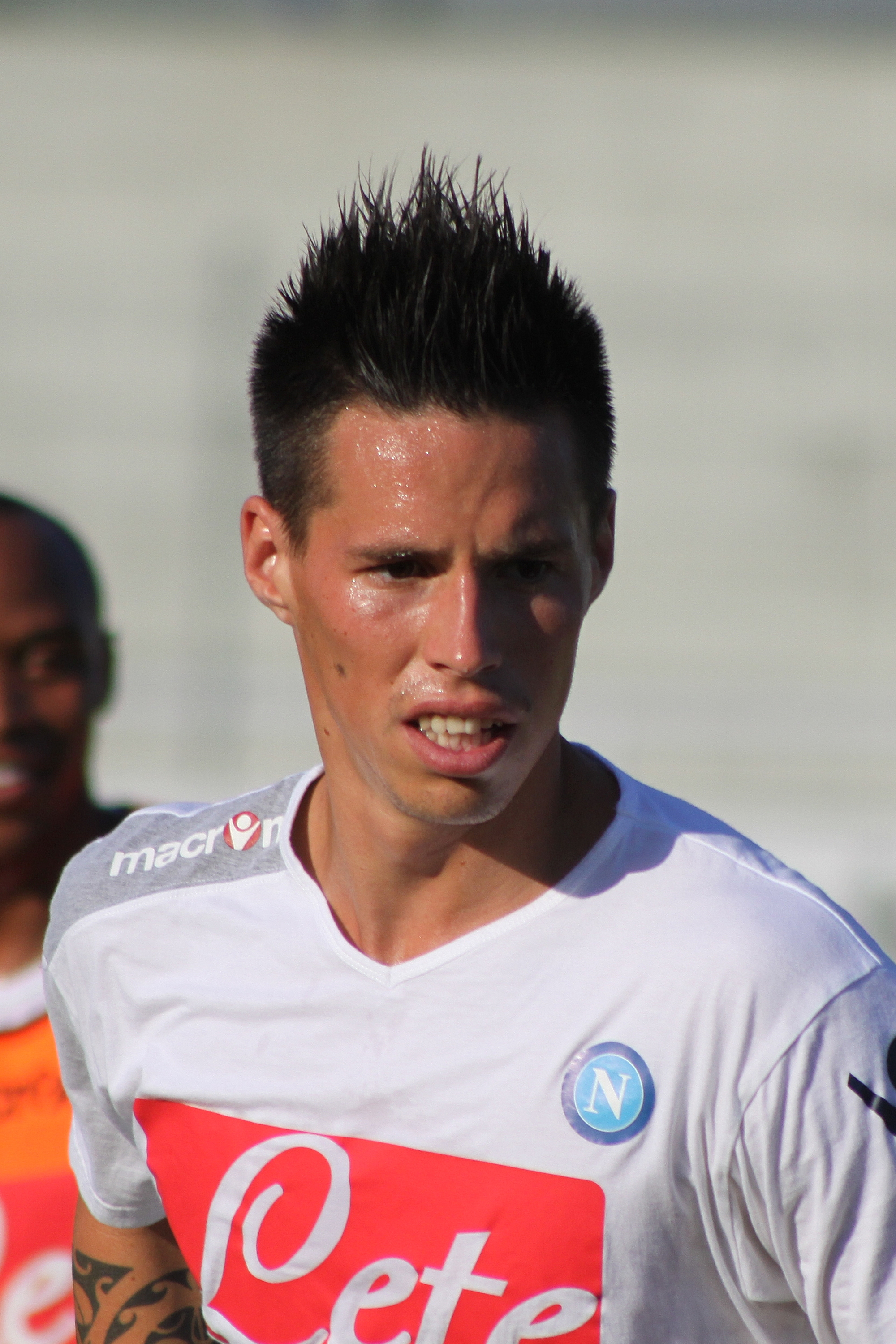
Hamšík playing for Napoli in 2009

On 28 June 2007, newly promoted Serie A club Napoli announced Hamšík had signed a five-year contract with the club after Napoli paid Brescia a €5.5 million transfer fee.

Hamšík played his first competitive match with Napoli on 15 August 2007, against Cesena in the first round of the Coppa Italia; Napoli won the match 4–0, as Hamšík set up the opening goal and scored the second himself. He scored his first goal in Serie A on 16 September 2007 in the match against Sampdoria.

His football icon is Czech midfielder Pavel Nedvěd, to whom Hamšík has often been compared due to his playing style. In 2007, he was voted the second-best Slovak footballer of the year, after Martin Škrtel, and also he was voted the best young Slovak footballer (the Peter Dubovský Trophy). Hamšík ended his first season with Napoli as the club's top scorer, with nine goals from 37 matches. At the start of the 2008–09 season, Hamšík scored in both of Napoli's first two matches and went on to score a further nine goals in his second season with the club, finishing as Napoli's top scorer for the second-straight year. He was named 2008's Serie A Young Footballer of the Year in the January 2009 awards ceremony.

In March 2009, he was announced as runner-up, again behind Martin Škrtel, in the Slovak Footballer of the Year award for 2008, as well as being that year's best young Slovak footballer, for the second year in a row.

==== 2010–11 season ====
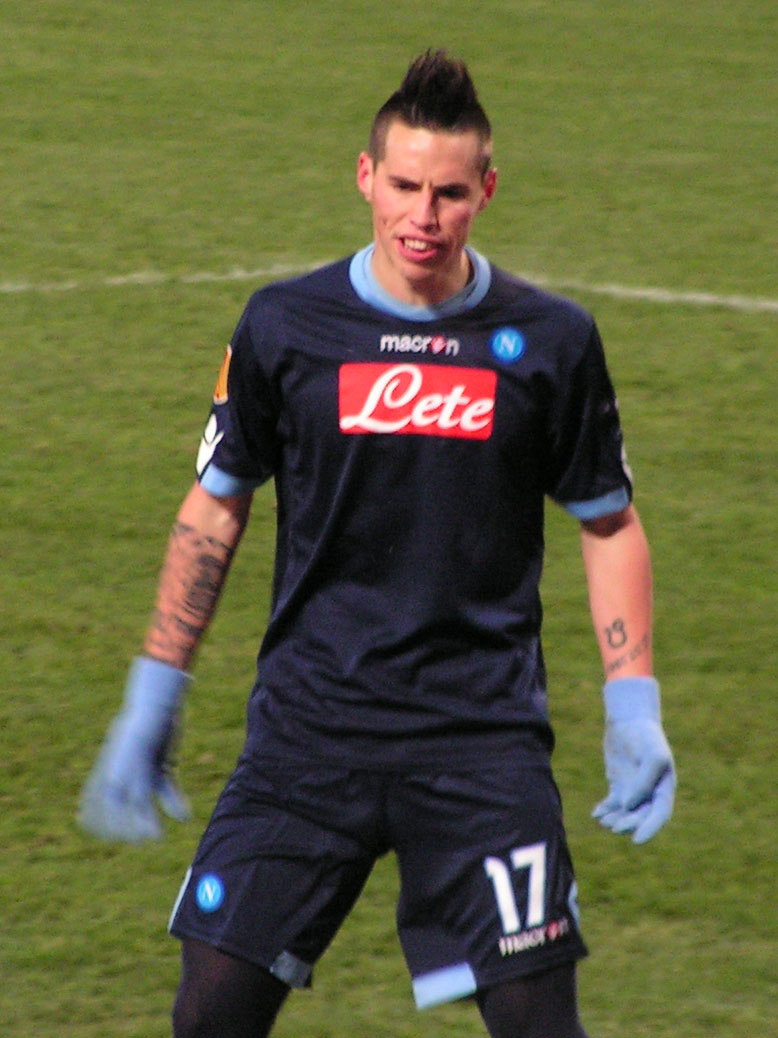
Hamšík playing in the Europa League against Utrecht in 2010

On 19 September 2010, Hamšík scored Napoli's first goal as they came back from a goal down to defeat Sampdoria 2–1 in Genoa. On 23 September, Hamšík signed a three-year contract extension set to last until June 2015. Three days later, Hamšík scored his second goal of the new season with an 81st-minute penalty to earn Napoli a 4–1 comeback win away to newly promoted Cesena. On 30 January 2011, Hamšík scored a well taken effort as Napoli hammered Sampdoria 4–0.

The 2010–11 season was very productive for Hamšík, as he helped lead Napoli to an automatic qualification spot for the UEFA Champions League by finishing third in Serie A. Hamšík played in 36 of Napoli's 38 Serie A matches that season, scoring 11 goals and contributing 6 assists.

==== 2011–12 season ====
Hamšík scored the winning goal in Napoli's 2–0 home victory over Villarreal on 27 September, earning Napoli its first ever victory in the Champions League. On 29 November, Napoli welcomed Serie A table leaders Juventus to the Stadio San Paolo; Hamšík missed a 15th-minute penalty before heading in a goal to give the hosts the lead seven minutes later. The match ended in a 3–3 draw after Napoli conceded two late goals to preserve Juventus' unbeaten start to the season.

Hamšík provided an assist for Gökhan Inler's opening goal against Villarreal on 7 December and then scored himself, helping Napoli to a 2–0 victory in Spain. The win secured qualification for the round of 16 in a difficult group, which included Bayern Munich and Manchester City. Hamšík helped Napoli finish the first half of the 2011–12 campaign on a high, scoring a superb goal in Napoli's 6–1 hammering of Genoa on 21 December. Hamšík also provided assists for strikes by Goran Pandev and Walter Gargano in the match. Through the first half of the 2011–12 campaign, Hamšík had appeared in 16 Serie A matches, contributing five goals and five assists. In Napoli's European campaign, Hamšík appeared in all six group stage matches and contributed two goals and one assist.

Following the winter break, Hamšík provided an assist for Edinson Cavani's goal and scored Napoli's third goal in its 3–1 defeat of Palermo on 8 January 2012. On 13 February 2012, he made his 200th appearance for Napoli in a 2–0 home win over Chievo.

On 9 March, Hamšík signed a one-year contract extension with Napoli, keeping him at the club until June 2016. The announcement was made following Hamšík scoring an incredible angled shot against Cagliari earlier that day, as Napoli ran out 6–3 winners. Hamšík's final goal of the season came in a 2–0 victory over Palermo on 1 May, as he doubled Napoli's lead in the 35th minute following a penalty from Edinson Cavani. Napoli finished the season in fifth place in Serie A, with Hamšík contributing nine league goals and nine assists.

Hamšík was also influential as Napoli reached the Coppa Italia final against Scudetto winners Juventus on 20 May. After receiving a pass from Goran Pandev, Hamšík was one-on-one with Juve goalkeeper Marco Storari and beat the onrushing Storari, securing a 2–0 win which delivered The Partenopei its first trophy in over 20 years.

==== 2012–13 season ====
Hamšík started in the 2012 Supercoppa Italiana, held in Beijing, on 11 August; however, Napoli were defeated by Juventus 4–2 in extra time. Later that month, in Napoli's first league fixture of the 2012–13 Serie A season, Hamšík scored the club's first goal and assisted Christian Maggio's strike in an eventual 3–0 defeat of Palermo. Missing leading goal-scorer Edinson Cavani for the club's match against Chievo on 28 October 2012, Hamšík connected on a Juan Camilo Zúñiga cross to give Napoli a 1–0 victory. On 6 January 2013, he made his 200th Serie A appearance in a 4–1 home win over Roma. On the penultimate matchday of the Serie A season, Hamšík collected a pass from Goran Pandev and nudged the ball home in the 93rd minute, rescuing a 2–1 win over Siena, confirming the club's place in the group stages of the Champions League while condemning Siena to relegation. The Slovak featured in every Serie A match for Napoli during the 2012–13 season, providing 11 goals and 14 assists as the Partenopei finished second behind reigning champions Juventus, a season which proved to be manager Walter Mazzarri's last at the club, as he became coach of Internazionale later that summer.

==== 2013–14 season ====
On 10 August 2013, Hamšík signed a contract extension with Napoli, tying him to the club until the summer of 2018. In the first match of the 2013–14 Serie A season on 26 August 2013, Hamšík scored Napoli's second and third goals in the club's 3–0 home defeat of Bologna. Hamšík continued his scoring form in Napoli's following match, netting another brace in their 4–2 away victory over Chievo on 31 August.

Following Paolo Cannavaro's departure to Sassuolo in the 2014 January transfer window, Hamšík was named Napoli's new captain. On 27 April 2014, he made his 300th appearance for Napoli in a 0–0 draw against Internazionale. On 3 May 2014, Hamšík played 63 minutes in Napoli's 3–1 win over Fiorentina in the 2014 Coppa Italia Final.

==== 2014–15 season ====
On 27 August 2014, Hamšík scored the opening goal, his first of the 2014–15 season, in the second leg of Napoli's Champions League play-off against Athletic Bilbao, as Bilbao came from behind to win the match 3–1 at home and eliminate Napoli from the competition. On 20 October, Hamšík scored the opening goal in a 2–0 away win over his former club Slovan Bratislava in Napoli's second group match of that season's UEFA Europa League, making his 40th appearance for the club in UEFA club competitions in the process and overtaking Antonio Juliano as the club's record appearance holder in such matches.

On 22 December, Hamšík lifted the 2014 Supercoppa Italiana as Napoli's captain, defeating Juventus 6–5 on penalties after a 2–2 draw following extra time. On 22 January 2015, he scored his first Coppa Italia goal of the season in the round of 16 against Udinese, as Napoli went on to win the match on penalties. On 3 May, he scored his 90th goal for Napoli in a 3–0 victory over Milan in Serie A.

==== 2015–16 season ====
Under new Napoli manager Maurizio Sarri, Hamšík returned to playing as a central midfielder on the left in Napoli's three-man midfield for the 2015–16 season, which he described as being his preferred role. On 23 August 2015, Hamšík scored the opening goal in a 2–1 away defeat to Sassuolo on the opening match of the Serie A season. On 17 September, he scored in a 5–0 win over Club Brugge in the group stage of the Europa League. He made his 300th Serie A appearance on 6 January 2016, scoring in a 2–1 home win over Torino. In the following league match, on 10 January, he made his 300th Serie A appearance for Napoli in a 5–1 away win over Frosinone, as Napoli finished the first half of the season as unofficial "winter champions". He marked the occasion by scoring a goal, his 80th in Serie A, all of which were scored with Napoli.

==== 2016–17 season ====
On 6 August 2016, Napoli announced Hamšík had signed a new four-year deal, keeping him at the club until 2020. On 24 September, he scored his 100th goal for the club in a 2–0 home win over Chievo in Serie A.

==== 2017–18 season ====
On 16 December 2017, Hamšík scored his 115th goal for Napoli in a 3–1 away victory over Torino, equalling Diego Maradona as the club's all-time top scorer. He surpassed Maradona's record one week later, becoming Napoli's outright all-time top goalscorer with his 116th goal for the club, which came in a 3–2 victory against Sampdoria in Naples. On 6 May 2018, he scored his 100th goal in Serie A (all of which came with Napoli) in a 2–2 home draw against Torino after coming off the bench.

==== 2018–19 season ====
On 23 September 2018, Hamšík made his 400th appearance in Serie A in a 3–1 away win over Torino. On 28 October, he made his 511th appearance for Napoli in a 1–1 home draw against Roma, equaling Giuseppe Bruscolotti as the club's record all-time appearance holder. On 6 November, he overtook Bruscolotti with his 512th appearance in all competitions for Napoli in a 1–1 home draw against Paris Saint-Germain in the Champions League. He left the club with 121 goals for Napoli from 520 appearances across all competitions.

=== Dalian Professional ===
On 14 February 2019, he agreed a contract with Chinese club Dalian Professional (then Dalian Yifang) for a reported fee of €13 million, bringing to an end an eleven-and-a-half year spell with Napoli. On 3 March, in the opening match of the 2019 Chinese Super League season, Hamšík made his club debut in a 1–1 away draw against Henan Jianye. In 2020, it was reported he earned a weekly wage of about €200,000. Earlier reports suggested an annual salary of about €9m.

=== IFK Göteborg ===
On 8 March 2021, he signed as a free agent with Swedish club IFK Göteborg. After breaking the contract with his then club Dalian Professional, he sought his way back to Europe to get playtime before UEFA Euro 2020. He then turned to Allsvenskan, where the transfer window still was open, and signed for Göteborg until 30 August 2021. He made his debut for Göteborg on 19 April in a league game against AIK, replacing Simon Thern in the 73rd minute of a 2–0 win. He scored his first and only goal for the club on 17 May in a 2–2 draw with IK Sirius, which he described as one of his best ever.

=== Trabzonspor ===
On 8 June 2021, it was announced he will join Turkish club Trabzonspor on a two-year contract, effective from 1 July. Hamšík scored on his Süper Lig debut for the club, a 5–1 win over Yeni Malatyaspor on 16 August. The 2021–22 Süper Lig finished with Trabzonspor as champions, with Hamšík winning a championship for the first time in his career. He was subsequently named the Süper Lig Foreign Player of the Year for the 2021–22 season.

At the start of the 2022–23 season, Hamšík won his second trophy with Trabzonspor; on 30 July 2022 he was part of the side which defeated Sivasspor 4–0 in the 2022 Turkish Super Cup. On 1 June 2023, Hamšík announced that he would retire from football at the end of the season. He bade farewell to his club fans in the 37th round of the Turkish league.

== International career ==
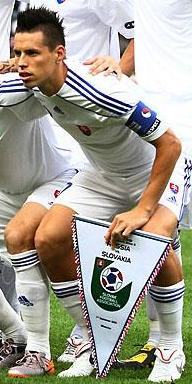
Hamšík with Slovakia in 2010

Hamšík represented Slovakia at junior level, playing in the UEFA European Under-17 Championship qualifiers and the UEFA European Under-19 Championship. He played also for the Slovakia national U21 team.

Hamšík was a regular member of the Slovakia national team. He made his debut on 7 February 2007 in a friendly against Poland, which ended in a 2–2 draw. He played his second match against Germany in the UEFA Euro 2008 qualification, which Slovakia lost 2–1. He became the key member of the attack for the national team, usually playing as a left or central attacking midfielder. Hamšík captained his country in its first FIFA World Cup experience in South Africa in 2010, where the nation made it to the first knockout stage after defeating then-world champions Italy 3–2. Slovakia was defeated by later finalists Netherlands in the round of 16.

Hamšík also played a key role in helping his nation qualify for Euro 2016 for the first time in the nation's history, finishing as Slovakia's top scorer, leading the team to a second place in its qualifying group behind defending champions Spain. At the final tournament, Slovakia suffered a closely contested 2–1 defeat to Wales in its opening match of the competition on 11 June. Hamšík came close to opening the scoring in the third minute of play after dribbling past several Welsh defenders, but his strike was denied by Ben Davies' goal-line clearance. In Slovakia's second group B match of the tournament, against Russia on 15 June 2016, Hamšík had set up a goal for Vladimír Weiss and later scored another himself in a 2–1 win, his nation's first in the competition. Following a goal-less draw against England on 20 June, Slovakia advanced to the second round as the best third-placed team of the tournament. However, Slovakia was eliminated in the round of 16, on 26 June, after a 3–0 defeat to reigning world champions Germany.

On 5 October 2017, Hamšík made his 100th appearance for the Slovak national team in a 0–1 loss to Scotland in a 2018 FIFA World Cup qualification match.

On 13 October 2018, Hamšík made his 108th international appearance in a 2–1 home defeat to Czech Republic in the UEFA Nations League; with this cap, he overtook Miroslav Karhan to become Slovakia's most capped player ever. He marked the occasion with a goal, his 22nd for his country, putting him equal with Szilárd Németh as his nation's second-highest goalscorer of all time, only behind Róbert Vittek with 23 goals.

In March 2019, after a surprise retirement of Martin Škrtel at the end of February, Hamšík regained the position of the captain of the national team, despite captaining the team some 20-times since 2010, most notably during the 2010 World Cup. In the intermediate period, Hamšík served as the vice-captain to Škrtel.

=== Retirement ===
==== Announcement ====
In May 2022, Hamšík announced his international retirement, capping a total of 135 matches and scoring 26 goals in them. He stated that his retirement is caused by increasing number of injuries he went through in preceding months and to spend more time with his family. Nonetheless, he stated he would wish to play in a final retirement match at home during the autumn of the year.

==== Farewell match ====
Hamšík was afforded this recognition on 20 November 2022 at Tehelné pole during an international friendly versus Chile. Earlier in the month, on 17 November, the national team also featured in another friendly at Podgorica City Stadium versus Montenegro. While Hamšík was a part of the squad for both fixtures, he did not appear in Podgorica, remaining out of the match day squad. The match against Montenegro finished as a 2–2 draw.

For his retirement match versus Chile, on 17 November, Hamšík expressed that he hoped to fill up the Tehelné pole stadium. Prior to the match, he was praised by Francesco Calzona as being a "silent leader", recalling their period of cooperation in Napoli. Hamšík had provided admission and transportation for the majority of youth players from his RSC Hamsik Academy. The caravan of 7 coaches and dozens of cars from Hamšík's native Banská Bystrica to Bratislava numbered over 500 people.

During the match, Hamšík captained the team. Although it was expected that he was going to be subbed off earlier during the second half, Hamšík remained on the pitch for almost the entirety of the match, only being replaced in the 89th minute of the match by Martin Regáli. Hamšík was given a standing ovation by almost 20 thousand spectators of an essentially sold out stadium. During the substitution he was reduced to tears, reducing Calzona to tears in turn. In play, Hamšík continued to be a key player of Slovakia completing about 90 passes, with almost 90% accuracy with the media noting his cooperation with László Bénes. Repeatedly, fans chanted his name and he was given a guard of honour by his team-mates after the match. The match was also filled with numerous banner commemorations, social media interactions and a 17th minute standing ovation, as well as farewell messages from his relatives and previous national team managers including Ján Kocian, Ján Kozák and Vladimír Weiss.

During the post-match press conferences and media appearances, Hamšík did not rule out the option to re-join the national team in a managerial or coaching capacity in the future.

==== Brief return ====
In June 2023, Hamšík was recalled as an emergency call-up to the national side for their UEFA Euro 2024 qualifying matches due to numerous injuries in the midfield. He took part in both wins against Iceland and Liechtenstein, bringing his total number of caps for the national team to 138. Following his final retirement from both international and club football, Hamšík joined the Slovakia national team as team manager in September 2023.

== Style of play ==
"Hamšík is my heir. He is the footballer who most resembles me in terms of his characteristics and playing style."

— Pavel Nedvěd.

Hamšík has been described as "quick, energetic, hard-working, and tactically versatile midfielder, who was capable of playing in several offensive positions on either side of the pitch, or even through the centre". Throughout his career, he was deployed as a central midfielder, as an attacking midfielder, as a mezzala, as a winger, or even as a supporting striker or inside forward on occasion. Although naturally right footed, he was capable of striking the ball well with either foot, and was known for his ability to both score and create goals, often dropping deep to participate in the build-up of his team's plays, courtesy of his vision, passing, and crossing ability. A talented, elegant, and technically gifted advanced playmaker, in addition to his footballing skills, he was also known for his leadership and stamina, as well as his play, movement, creativity, and intelligence off the ball, in particular his ability to find spaces and make attacking runs to get into good positions in the opposition's half, and his tireless running. He was also capable of playing as a deep-lying playmaker or in a box-to-box role, due to his passing and tactical intelligence, and was an effective free kick and penalty taker, although his record from the penalty spot was inconsistent at times throughout his career. Francesco Calzona, who crossed paths with Hamšík on club and international level, described him as an elegant and silent leader.

== Managerial career ==
Having joined the managerial team of Francesco Calzona with the Slovak national team as a team manager in the summer of 2023, when Calzona was signed as SSC Napoli manager in February 2024, Hamšík was offered a post in the coaching staff of the southern-Italian club. Hamšík refused the further undisclosed offer in order to concentrate on national team, private footballing academy and family commitments.

== Other activities ==
=== Footballing activities ===
As early as 2013, Hamšík invested in FK Jupie Banská Bystrica - Podlavice, his youth club, renaming the club to Jupie Futbalová škola Mareka Hamšíka. In May 2022, while announcing his international retirement, Hamšík also announced the fusion of Jupie FŠMH and FK Rakytovce to form Rakytovce Sporting Club Hamsik Academy Banska Bystrica, with Rakytovce providing a 3. Liga senior side and Jupie FŠMH providing youth teams. The club dissolved in May 2025, with Hamšík moving onto the role of U15 team coach at MFK Dukla Banská Bystrica.

=== Business activities ===
Even during Hamšík's career in Napoli, Hamšík, in cooperation with his father Richard, began to develop his brand of wine assortments under the name Hamšík Winery. In 2021, Hamšík Winery broadened their business ventures into the beer industry, cooperating with Urpiner brewery from Hamšík's native Banská Bystrica.

=== Marketing and representative activities ===
Ahead of the 2010 FIFA World Cup, then 22-year-old Hamšík was featured in popular Slovak T-com ads featuring a South African child-fan name 'Dédé', played by Sithembele Jinghosa. The gimmick ad series was continued ahead of Christmas in 2010.

In 2015, Hamšík represented Slovakia and co-starred in events at the country's pavilion at Expo 2015 in Milan along with Slovak President Andrej Kiska.

== Personal life ==
Hamšík is the son of Richard Hamšík and Renáta Hamšíková. In July 2014, Hamšík married Martina (née Fraňová). The couple have three children—two sons named Christian (born 2010) and Lucas (born 2012), and a daughter named Melissa (born 2017). His sister Michaela is married to Uruguayan footballer Walter Gargano, Hamšík's former teammate at Napoli, who has made him an avid fan of the Uruguayan club Atletico Peñarol, having been seen at matches before. His grandfather Ivan Hamšík ran unsuccessfully as a candidate in 2023 Slovak parliamentary election.

== Career statistics ==
=== Club ===
Appearances and goals by club, season and competition
Club	Season	League			Cup		Continental		Other		Total	
Club	Season	Division	Apps	Goals	Apps	Goals	Apps	Goals	Apps	Goals	Apps	Goals
Slovan Bratislava	2004–05	2. Liga	6	1	0	0	—		—		6	1
Brescia	2004–05	Serie A	1	0	0	0	—		—		1	0
Brescia	2005–06	Serie B	24	0	4	1	—		—		28	1
Brescia	2006–07	Serie B	40	10	5	1	—		—		45	11
Brescia	Total		65	10	9	2	—		—		74	12
Napoli	2007–08	Serie A	37	9	3	1	—		—		40	10
Napoli	2008–09	Serie A	32	9	2	1	6 (Note: Two appearances and one goal in UEFA Intertoto Cup, four appearances and one goal in UEFA Cup)	2	—		40	12
Napoli	2009–10	Serie A	37	12	2	0	—		—		39	12
Napoli	2010–11	Serie A	37	11	2	0	10 (Note: Appearances in UEFA Europa League)	2	—		49	13
Napoli	2011–12	Serie A	37	9	5	1	8 (Note: Appearances in UEFA Champions League)	2	—		50	12
Napoli	2012–13	Serie A	38	11	1	0	4	0	1 (Note: Appearance in Supercoppa Italiana)	0	44	11
Napoli	2013–14	Serie A	28	7	5	0	8 (Note: Four appearances in UEFA Champions League, four appearances in UEFA Europa League)	0	—		41	7
Napoli	2014–15	Serie A	35	7	4	1	14 (Note: Two appearances and one goal in UEFA Champions League, twelve appearances and four goals in UEFA Europa League)	5	1	0	54	13
Napoli	2015–16	Serie A	38	6	2	0	6	2	—		46	8
Napoli	2016–17	Serie A	38	12	3	1	8	2	—		49	15
Napoli	2017–18	Serie A	38	7	1	0	10	0	—		49	7
Napoli	2018–19	Serie A	13	0	0	0	6	1	—		19	1
Napoli	Total		408	100	30	5	80	16	2	0	520	121
Dalian Professional	2019	Chinese Super League	28	2	3	1	—		—		31	3
Dalian Professional	2020	Chinese Super League	14	2	0	0	—		—		14	2
Dalian Professional	Total		42	4	3	1	—		—		45	5
IFK Göteborg	2021	Allsvenskan	6	1	0	0	—		—		6	1
Trabzonspor	2021–22	Süper Lig	26	2	2	0	4 (Note: Appearances in UEFA Europa Conference League)	0	—		32	2
Trabzonspor	2022–23	Süper Lig	23	3	3	0	6	1	1 (Note: Appearance in Turkish Super Cup)	0	33	4
Trabzonspor	Total		49	5	5	0	10	1	1	0	65	6
Career total			576	121	47	8	90	17	3	0	716	146

=== International ===
Appearances and goals by national team and year
National team	Year	Apps	Goals
Slovakia	2007	9	2
Slovakia	2008	9	3
Slovakia	2009	11	3
Slovakia	2010	13	0
Slovakia	2011	9	0
Slovakia	2012	9	2
Slovakia	2013	8	1
Slovakia	2014	7	3
Slovakia	2015	8	3
Slovakia	2016	12	3
Slovakia	2017	8	1
Slovakia	2018	8	1
Slovakia	2019	9	3
Slovakia	2020	6	1
Slovakia	2021	9	0
Slovakia	2022	1	0
Slovakia	2023	2	0
Total		138	26

Scores and results list Slovakia's goal tally first, score column indicates score after each Hamšík goal.

List of international goals scored by Marek Hamšík
No.	Date	Venue	Cap	Opponent	Score	Result	Competition
1	13 October 2007	Mestský štadión, Dubnica nad Váhom, Slovakia	6	San Marino	1–0	7–0	UEFA Euro 2008 qualification
2	21 November 2007	Stadio Olimpico, Serravalle, San Marino	9	San Marino	3–0	5–0	UEFA Euro 2008 qualification
3	6 September 2008	Tehelné pole, Bratislava, Slovakia	15	Northern Ireland	2–0	2–1	2010 FIFA World Cup qualification
4	19 November 2008	Štadión pod Dubňom, Žilina, Slovakia	18	Liechtenstein	1–0	4–0	Friendly
5	19 November 2008	Štadión pod Dubňom, Žilina, Slovakia	18	Liechtenstein	2–0	4–0	Friendly
6	10 February 2009	Tsirion Stadium, Limassol, Cyprus	19	Ukraine	2–2	2–3	Friendly
7	5 September 2009	Tehelné pole, Bratislava, Slovakia	25	Czech Republic	2–1	2–2	2010 FIFA World Cup qualification
8	14 November 2009	Tehelné pole, Bratislava, Slovakia	28	United States	1–0	1–0	Friendly
9	15 August 2012	TRE-FOR Park, Odense, Denmark	55	Denmark	2–1	3–1	Friendly
10	12 October 2012	Štadión Pasienky, Bratislava, Slovakia	58	Latvia	2–0	3–0	2014 FIFA World Cup qualification
11	10 September 2013	Štadión pod Dubňom, Žilina, Slovakia	67	Bosnia and Herzegovina	1–0	1–2	2014 FIFA World Cup qualification
12	12 October 2014	Borisov Arena, Barysaw, Belarus	73	Belarus	1–0	3–1	UEFA Euro 2016 qualification
13	12 October 2014	Borisov Arena, Barysaw, Belarus	73	Belarus	2–1	3–1	UEFA Euro 2016 qualification
14	18 November 2014	Štadión pod Dubňom, Žilina, Slovakia	75	Finland	2–0	2–1	Friendly
15	14 June 2015	Štadión pod Dubňom, Žilina, Slovakia	78	Macedonia	2–0	2–1	UEFA Euro 2016 qualification
16	12 October 2015	Stade Josy Barthel, Route d'Arlon, Luxembourg	82	Luxembourg	1–0	4–2	UEFA Euro 2016 qualification
17	12 October 2015	Stade Josy Barthel, Route d'Arlon, Luxembourg	82	Luxembourg	4–2	4–2	UEFA Euro 2016 qualification
18	29 May 2016	WWK Arena, Augsburg, Germany	86	Germany	1–1	3–1	Friendly
19	15 June 2016	Stade Pierre-Mauroy, Villeneuve-d'Ascq, France	89	Russia	2–0	2–1	UEFA Euro 2016
20	11 November 2016	Štadión Antona Malatinského, Trnava, Slovakia	95	Lithuania	4–0	4–0	2018 FIFA World Cup qualification
21	10 June 2017	LFF Stadium, Vilnius, Lithuania	97	Lithuania	2–0	2–1	2018 FIFA World Cup qualification
22	13 October 2018	Štadión Antona Malatinského, Trnava, Slovakia	108	Czech Republic	1–1	1–2	2018–19 UEFA Nations League B
23	11 June 2019	Bakcell Arena, Baku, Azerbaijan	114	Azerbaijan	3–1	5–1	UEFA Euro 2020 qualification
24	11 June 2019	Bakcell Arena, Baku, Azerbaijan	114	Azerbaijan	4–1	5–1	UEFA Euro 2020 qualification
25	19 November 2019	Štadión Antona Malatinského, Trnava, Slovakia	120	Azerbaijan	2–0	2–0	UEFA Euro 2020 qualification
26	14 October 2020	Štadión Antona Malatinského, Trnava, Slovakia	123	Israel	1–0	2–3	2020–21 UEFA Nations League B

== Honours ==
Napoli

- Coppa Italia: 2011–12, 2013–14
- Supercoppa Italiana: 2014

Trabzonspor

- Süper Lig: 2021–22
- Turkish Super Cup: 2022

Individual

- Serie A Young Footballer of the Year: 2008
- Serie A Team of the Year: 2010–11, 2015–16, 2016–17
- Most assists in Serie A: 2012–13, 2014–15
- Peter Dubovský Trophy: 2007, 2008
- Slovak Footballer of the Year: 2009, 2010, 2013, 2014, 2015, 2016, 2017, 2018
- UEFA Europa League Squad of the Season: 2014–15
- Süper Lig Foreign Player of the Year: 2021–22

Records

- Napoli all-time appearance holder: 520 appearances
- Slovakia all-time appearance holder: 138 appearances
- Slovakia all-time top scorer: 26 goals

== See also ==
- List of top international men's football goalscorers by country
- List of men's footballers with 100 or more international caps
