= 2014–15 Torino FC season =

Torino
2014–15 season
- President: Urbano Cairo
- Manager: Giampiero Ventura
- Stadium: Stadio Olimpico di Torino
- Serie A: 9th
- Coppa Italia: Round of 16
- UEFA Europa League: Round of 16
- Top goalscorer: League: Fabio Quagliarella (13); All: Fabio Quagliarella (17)
- Highest home attendance: 26,296 vs Juventus (26 April 2015, Serie A)
- Lowest home attendance: 4,305 vs Lazio (14 January 2015, Coppa Italia)
- Average home league attendance: 16,790
| Home colours | Away colours | Third colours |

The 2014–15 season was Torino Football Club's 104th season of competitive football, 87th season in the top division of Italian football and 70th season in Serie A.

== Season overview ==
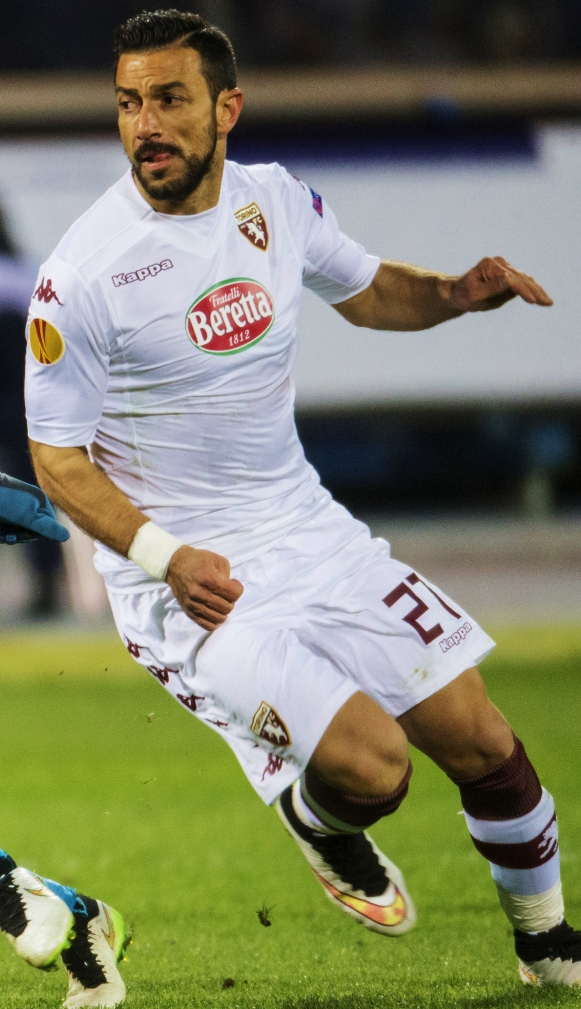
Fabio Quagliarella, back at Torino after nine years

In the 2014–15 season Torino returned to one of the major European competitions after two decades, with a new starting line in attack: the club sold its attacking duo of the previous year, Alessio Cerci and Ciro Immobile, replacing them with Fabio Quagliarella (who grew up playing for Torino and returned after nine years) and Amauri. In the winter transfer window, Maxi López was added. The rest of the squad would see, primarily, the additions of Cristian Molinaro and Bruno Peres.

In Serie A, the team had a subdued start perhaps caused by the departure of the attack during the summer; in particular, the unfortunate loss in the derby on 30 November (1–2) at Juventus Stadium in injury time despite a numerical advantage and the goal of Peres, a coast to coast effort, running with the ball for 80 metres, which ended Torino's goal drought in the derby after 12 long years. After a turnaround in the league and 12 consecutive useful results obtained (thanks to the excellent performance of the central defender Kamil Glik), on 26 April 2015, Torino won the derby 2–1 against La Vecchia Signora for the first time in 20 years.

In Coppa Italia the Piedmont club came into play directly in the knockout stage and were immediately eliminated at the hands of Lazio (1–3). Torino were more successful in the Europa League, where the team qualified finishing second of their group, progressing to the round of 16 after eliminating Athletic Bilbao in the round of 32, achieving a 3–2 victory on 26 February at the San Mamés, a first for an Italian team in Bilbao. In the round of 16, Torino was eliminated the Russians of Zenit Saint Petersburg, failing to reverse the defeat in St. Petersburg in the first leg (0–2) with an irrelevant return home win (1–0).

== Players ==
=== Squad information ===
As of 30 September 2014.

Note: Flags indicate national team as defined under FIFA eligibility rules; some limited exceptions apply. Players may hold more than one non-FIFA nationality.

| No. | Pos. | Nation | Player |
|---|---|---|---|
| 1 | GK | BEL | Jean-François Gillet |
| 3 | DF | ITA | Cristian Molinaro |
| 4 | MF | ALB | Migjen Basha |
| 5 | DF | ITA | Cesare Bovo |
| 6 | MF | ESP | Rubén Perez (on loan from Atlético Madrid) |
| 7 | MF | MAR | Omar El Kaddouri (on loan from Napoli) |
| 8 | MF | SWE | Alexander Farnerud |
| 9 | FW | ARG | Marcelo Larrondo |
| 10 | FW | BRA | Barreto |
| 13 | GK | ITA | Luca Castellazzi |
| 14 | MF | ITA | Alessandro Gazzi |
| 17 | FW | VEN | Josef Martínez |
| 18 | DF | SWE | Pontus Jansson |
| 19 | DF | SRB | Nikola Maksimović |
| 20 | MF | ITA | Giuseppe Vives (vice-captain) |
| 21 | DF | URU | Gastón Silva |

| No. | Pos. | Nation | Player |
|---|---|---|---|
| 22 | FW | ITA | Amauri |
| 23 | MF | ITA | Antonio Nocerino (on loan from Milan) |
| 24 | DF | ITA | Emiliano Moretti |
| 25 | DF | POL | Kamil Glik (captain) |
| 27 | FW | ITA | Fabio Quagliarella |
| 28 | MF | ARG | Juan Sánchez Miño |
| 29 | DF | MNE | Marko Vešović |
| 30 | GK | ITA | Daniele Padelli |
| 32 | DF | ITA | Salvatore Masiello |
| 33 | DF | BRA | Bruno Peres |
| 36 | DF | ITA | Matteo Darmian (3rd captain) |
| 91 | MF | ITA | Giovanni Graziano |
| 94 | MF | ITA | Marco Benassi |

== Transfers ==
=== Summer 2014 ===
==== In ====
First Team
| Position | Player | From club | Transfer fee |
|---|---|---|---|
| GK | Vlada Avramov | | free transfer |
| GK | Luca Castellazzi | | free transfer |
| GK | Alfred Gomis | Crotone | end of loan |
| DF | Pontus Jansson | | free transfer |
| DF | Nikola Maksimović | Apollon Limassol | outright €3,500,000 |
| DF | Cristian Molinaro | | free transfer |
| DF | Bruno Peres | Santos | outright €2,000,000 |
| DF | Gastón Silva | Defensor Sporting | outright €2,300,000 |
| MF | Marco Benassi | Internazionale | co-ownership €1,500,000 |
| MF | Omar El Kaddouri | Napoli | on loan |
| MF | Antonio Nocerino | Milan | on loan |
| MF | Ruben Pérez | Atlético Madrid | on loan / buying option |
| MF | Juan Sánchez Miño | Boca Juniors | outright €3,500,000 |
| FW | Amauri | Parma | outright €500,000 milioni |
| FW | Paulo Barreto | Udinese | co-ownership resolved €800,000 |
| FW | Ciro Immobile | Juventus | co-ownership resolved €8,000,000 |
| FW | Marcelo Larrondo | Siena | co-ownership resolved Emanuele Gatto exchanged |
| FW | Josef Martínez | Young Boys | outright €3,800,000 |
| FW | Fabio Quagliarella | Juventus | outright €3,050,000 |

Reserves and youth
| Position | Player | From club | Transfer fee |
|---|---|---|---|
| DF | Marco Chiosa | Bari | end of loan |
| DF | Davide Cinaglia | FeralpiSalò | co-ownership resolved |
| MF | Giorgio Fumana | Bra | end of loan |
| MF | Emanuele Gatto | Lumezzane | co-ownership resolved |
| MF | Nicolas Gorobsov | Poli Timișoara | end of loan |
| MF | Alen Stevanovic | Palermo | end of loan |
| MF | Sergiu Suciu | Juve Stabia | end of loan |
| FW | Abou Diop | Crotone | end of loan |
| FW | Abdulai Muniru | | outright |
| FW | Vittorio Parigini | Juve Stabia | end of loan |
| FW | Ilyos Zeytullayev | Gorica | end of loan |

==== Out ====
First Team
| Position | Player | From club | Transfer fee |
|---|---|---|---|
| GK | Vlada Avramov | Atalanta | loan |
| GK | Tommaso Berni | | end of contract |
| GK | Alfred Gomis | Avellino | loan |
| GK | Lys Gomis | Trapani | loan |
| DF | Antonio Barreca | Cittadella | loan |
| DF | Giovanni Pasquale | Udinese | end of loan |
| DF | Guillermo Rodríguez | Hellas Verona | outright €365,000 |
| DF | Marko Vešović | Rijeka | loan |
| MF | Alessandro Comentale | Como | loan |
| MF | Omar El Kaddouri | Napoli | co-ownership resolved €1,600,000 |
| MF | Jasmin Kurtić | Sassuolo | end of loan |
| MF | Panagiotis Tachtsidis | Catania | end of loan |
| FW | Mattia Aramu | Trapani | loan |
| FW | Alessio Cerci | Atlético Madrid | outright €16,000,000 + €3,000,000 bonus |
| FW | Emmanuel Gyasi | Pisa | loan |
| FW | Ciro Immobile | Borussia Dortmund | outright €11,800,000 + bonus |
| FW | Riccardo Meggiorini | | end of contract |

Reserves and youth
| Position | Player | From club | Transfer fee |
|---|---|---|---|
| GK | Umberto Saracco | | end of contract |
| DF | Marco Chiosa | Avellino | loan |
| DF | Davide Cinaglia | Ascoli | outright |
| DF | Riccardo Fiamozzi | Varese | co-ownership resolved €90,000 |
| DF | Andrea Ientile | Sudtirol | loan |
| DF | Stefano Ignico | | end of contract |
| DF | Luca Isoardi | Bra | outright |
| DF | Filippo Scaglia | Cittadella | co-ownership €300,000 |
| MF | Nicola Bellomo | Chievo | co-ownership resolved €400,000 |
| MF | Lorenzo Coccolo | | end of contract |
| MF | Marco Firriolo | Cuneo | co-ownership resolved |
| MF | Giorgio Fumana | Lumezzane | outright |
| MF | Emanuele Gatto | Siena | exchanged for Marcelo Larrondo |
| MF | Nicolas Gorobsov | | Mutual termination |
| MF | Umberto Miello | Monza | outright |
| MF | Luca Parodi | Ancona | loan |
| MF | Alen Stevanovic | Bari | loan / buying option |
| MF | Sergiu Suciu | Crotone | loan |
| FW | Matteo Colombi | Internazionale | end of loan |
| FW | Gianmario Comi | Milan | co-ownership resolved €350,000 |
| FW | Abou Diop | Ternana | loan |
| FW | Abdulai Muniru | Gorica | outright |
| FW | Vittorio Parigini | Perugia | loan |
| FW | Alessio Vita | Monza | co-ownershiped resolved |
| FW | Ilyos Zeytullayev | | end of contract |

=== Winter 2014–15 ===
==== In ====
First Team
| Position | Player | From club | Transfer fee |
|---|---|---|---|
| GK | Salvador Ichazo | Danubio | loan with buying option |
| MF | Álvaro González | Lazio | loan with buying option |
| FW | Maxi López | Chievo | outright |

Reserves and youth
| Position | Player | From club | Transfer fee |
|---|---|---|---|
| GK | Ricardo Abachisti | Terracina | end of loan |
| GK | Fabio D'Errico | Chisola | loan |
| GK | Alessandro Poggio | Borgaro Torinese | loan |
| DF | Francesco Ferrari | Juventus | loan |
| DF | Alex Ferrero | Chieri | end of loan |
| DF | Omar Amello | Colline Alfieri | loan |
| DF | Alessio Contorno | Collegno Paradiso | end of loan |
| DF | Luca Menini | Mantova | loan with buying option |
| MF | Alen Stevanović | Bari | end of loan |
| MF | Alessandro Comentale | Como | end of loan |
| MF | Gianvincenzo Martino | Foggia | loan |
| FW | Abou Diop | Ternana | end of loan |
| FW | Edoardo Lo Iacono | Delfino | loan |
| FW | Gregory Politanò | Albese | end of loan |
| FW | Daniele Ferrandino | Alpignano | end of loan |
| FW | Emmanuel Gyasi | Pisa | end of loan |
| FW | Francesco Serafino | Boca Juniors | outright |

==== Out ====
First Team
| Position | Player | From club | Transfer fee |
|---|---|---|---|
| GK | Jean-François Gillet | Catania | outright |
| MF | Antonio Nocerino | Milan | end of loan |
| MF | Rubén Pérez | Atlético Madrid | end of loan |
| FW | Marcelo Larrondo | Tigre | loan with buying option |

Reserves and youth
| Position | Player | From club | Transfer fee |
|---|---|---|---|
| GK | Nicholas Lentini | Bari | loan with buying option |
| DF | Federico Caronte | Udinese | loan with buying option |
| MF | Alen Stevanović | Spezia | loan |
| MF | Alessandro Comentale | Monza | loan |
| MF | Francesco Tahiraj | Carpi | loan |
| FW | Abou Diop | Matera | loan |
| FW | Emmanuel Gyasi | Mantova | loan with buying option |
| FW | Valerio Trani | Roma | end of loan |

== Pre-season and friendlies ==
| 12 July 2014 Friendly | Bormiese | 0–15 | Torino | Bormio, Italy |
| 17:00 CEST (UTC+02:00) | | | El Kaddouri 9', 18', 46'; Barreto 16', 28'; Bovo 27'; Nocerino 30'; Martínez 31'; Larrondo 51', 82', 85'; Vives 60' (pen.); Diop 69'; Glik 80'; Comentale 90' | Stadium: Campo Sportivo Comunale Bormio |

| 15 July 2014 Friendly | Torino | 6–0 | Sondrio | Bormio, Italy |
| 17:00 CEST (UTC+02:00) | Larrondo 34', 49'; Barreto 37'; Martínez 63'; Diop 72', 90' | Report | | Stadium: Campo Sportivo Comunale Bormio |

| 20 July 2014 Friendly | Torino (Italy) | 5–0 | (England) Barnsley | Riscone, Italy |
| 17:30 CEST (UTC+02:00) | Larrondo 16', 26', 43'; El Kaddouri 41' (pen.); Barreto 51' | Report |

| 24 July 2014 Friendly | Torino (Italy) | 0–1 | (Russia) Rubin Kazan | Riscone, Italy |
| 17:30 CEST (UTC+02:00) | | Report | Dević 61' |

| 27 July 2014 Friendly | Torino | 1–1 | Teramo | Riscone, Italy |
| 17:30 CEST (UTC+02:00) | Nocerino 41' | Report | Donnarumma 31' (pen.) |

== Competitions ==
=== Overall ===
| Competition | Started round | Final position / round | First match | Last match |
|---|---|---|---|---|
| Serie A | — | 9th | 31 August 2014 | 31 May 2015 |
| Coppa Italia | — | | 14 January 2015 | 14 January 2015 |
| UEFA Europa League | — | | 31 July 2014 | 19 March 2015 |

Updated to match played 25 May 2015
Source: Competitions

=== Serie A ===
==== League table ====
| Pos | Team | Pld | W | D | L | GF | GA | GD | Pts | Qualification or relegation |
|---|---|---|---|---|---|---|---|---|---|---|
| 7 | Sampdoria | 38 | 13 | 17 | 8 | 48 | 42 | +6 | 56 | Qualification for the Europa League third qualifying round (Note: Since the winners of the 2014–15 Coppa Italia (Juventus) qualified for European competition based on league position, the spot awarded to the cup winners (Europa League group stage) was passed to the fifth-placed team and the spot originally meant for the fifth-placed team (Europa League third qualifying round) was given to the highest placed team that has obtained an UEFA licence and not already qualified for European competition.) |
| 8 | Internazionale | 38 | 14 | 13 | 11 | 59 | 48 | +11 | 55 | |
| 9 | Torino | 38 | 14 | 12 | 12 | 48 | 45 | +3 | 54 | |
| 10 | Milan | 38 | 13 | 13 | 12 | 56 | 50 | +6 | 52 | |
| 11 | Palermo | 38 | 12 | 13 | 13 | 53 | 55 | −2 | 49 (Note: Palermo finished ahead of Sassuolo on head-to-head away goals scored: Palermo 2-1 Sassuolo, Sassuolo 0-0 Palermo.) | |

Source: 2014–15 Serie A, 2014-15 Serie A classification.
Rules for classification: 1) points; 2) head-to-head points; 3) head-to-head goal difference; 4) goal difference; 5) number of goals scored; 6) draw. (Head-to-head record is applied for clubs with the same number of points only once all matches between said clubs have been played.).

==== Results summary ====
| Overall | | | | | | | | Home | | | | | | Away | | | | | |
| Pld | W | D | L | GF | GA | GD | Pts | W | D | L | GF | GA | GD | W | D | L | GF | GA | GD |
|---|---|---|---|---|---|---|---|---|---|---|---|---|---|---|---|---|---|---|---|
| 38 | 14 | 12 | 12 | 48 | 45 | +3 | 54 | 8 | 7 | 4 | 25 | 14 | +11 | 6 | 5 | 8 | 23 | 31 | −8 |

Last updated: 31 May 2015.
Source: Competitive matches

==== Results by round ====
| Round | 1 | 2 | 3 | 4 | 5 | 6 | 7 | 8 | 9 | 10 | 11 | 12 | 13 | 14 | 15 | 16 | 17 | 18 | 19 | 20 | 21 | 22 | 23 | 24 | 25 | 26 | 27 | 28 | 29 | 30 | 31 | 32 | 33 | 34 | 35 | 36 | 37 | 38 |
|---|---|---|---|---|---|---|---|---|---|---|---|---|---|---|---|---|---|---|---|---|---|---|---|---|---|---|---|---|---|---|---|---|---|---|---|---|---|---|
| Ground | H | A | H | A | H | A | H | A | H | H | A | H | A | H | A | H | A | H | A | A | H | A | H | A | H | A | H | A | A | H | A | H | A | H | A | H | A | H |
| Result | D | L | L | W | D | L | W | L | W | D | L | L | L | D | D | W | D | D | W | W | W | W | D | D | W | L | L | W | W | D | D | W | D | L | L | W | L | W |
| Position | 13 | 17 | 20 | 12 | 12 | 14 | 12 | 13 | 12 | 12 | 14 | 15 | 15 | 17 | 15 | 14 | 14 | 14 | 13 | 13 | 10 | 8 | 9 | 10 | 8 | 8 | 9 | 7 | 7 | 7 | 8 | 8 | 8 | 9 | 9 | 9 | 9 | 9 |

Updated to match(es) played on 31 May 2015. Source: Competitive matches
A = Away; H = Home; W = Win; D = Draw; L = Loss

==== Matches ====
| 31 August 2014 1 | Torino | 0–0 | Internazionale | Turin |
| 20:45 CEST (UTC+02:00) | Maksimović (yellow card) 42' | Report | Hernanes (yellow card) 67'; Vidić (red card) 90+3' | Stadium: Stadio Olimpico di Torino; Attendance: 25,824; Referee: Daniele Doveri |

| 14 September 2014 2 | Sampdoria | 2–0 | Torino | Genoa |
| 15:00 CEST (UTC+02:00) | Obiang (yellow card) 24'; Gabbiadini 34'; De Silvestri (yellow card) 53'; Okaka 79'; Soriano (yellow card) 85' | Report | Bovo (yellow card) 13'; Glik (yellow card) 33'; Vives (yellow card) 64'; El Kaddouri (yellow card) 72' | Stadium: Stadio Luigi Ferraris; Attendance: 21,180; Referee: Paolo Mazzoleni |

| 21 September 2014 3 | Torino | 0–1 | Hellas Verona | Turin |
| 15:00 CEST (UTC+02:00) | Bovo (yellow card) 60'; Kaddouri (yellow card) 65'; Peres (yellow card) 82' | Report | Ioniță 66'; López (yellow card) 80'; Márquez (yellow card) 85' | Stadium: Stadio Olimpico di Torino; Attendance: 13,405; Referee: Luca Banti |

| 24 September 2014 4 | Cagliari | 1–2 | Torino | Cagliari |
| 20:45 CEST (UTC+02:00) | Cossu 11'; Avelar (yellow card) 28'; Rossettini (yellow card) 40' | Report | Glik 21'; Quagliarella 29'; Gazzi (yellow card) 33'; Benassi (yellow card) 87' | Stadium: Stadio Sant'Elia; Attendance: 9,400; Referee: Massimiliano Irrati |

| 28 September 2014 5 | Torino | 1–1 | Fiorentina | Turin |
| 15:00 CEST (UTC+02:00) | Moretti (yellow card) 18'; Sánchez (yellow card) 50'; Quagliarella 62'; Pérez (yellow card) 77' | Report | Babacar (yellow card) 19', (goal) 78'; Iličić (yellow card) 56' | Stadium: Stadio Olimpico di Torino; Attendance: 15,134; Referee: Paolo Valeri |

| 5 October 2014 6 | Napoli | 2–1 | Torino | Naples |
| 20:45 CEST (UTC+02:00) | Gargano (yellow card) 34'; Michu (yellow card) 41'; Insigne 55'; Callejón 72'; Maggio (yellow card) 84' | Report | Benassi (yellow card) 12'; Quagliarella 14', (yellow card) 70'; Vives (yellow card) 43'; El Kaddouri (red card) 90+5'; Glik (red card) 90+5' | Stadium: Stadio San Paolo; Attendance: 23,586; Referee: Davide Massa |

| 19 October 2014 7 | Torino | 1–0 | Udinese | Turin |
| 15:00 CEST (UTC+02:00) | Molinaro (yellow card) 13'; Benassi (yellow card) 43'; Quagliarella 62'; Pérez (yellow card) 88' | Report | Heurtaux (yellow card) 36'; Allan (yellow card) 66' | Stadium: Stadio Olimpico di Torino; Attendance: 13,434; Referee: Carmine Russo |

| 26 October 2014 8 | Lazio | 2–1 | Torino | Rome |
| 18:00 CET (UTC+01:00) | Biglia 15'; Cavanda (yellow card) 24'; Klose 60', (yellow card) 66' | Report | Benassi (yellow card) 27'; Farnerud 53' | Stadium: Stadio Olimpico; Attendance: 34,782; Referee: Piero Giacomelli |

| 29 October 2014 9 | Torino | 1–0 | Parma | Turin |
| 20:45 CET (UTC+01:00) | Darmian 10'; Glik (yellow card) 30' | Report | Gobbi (yellow card) 19'; Santacroce (yellow card) 59'; Coda (yellow card) 74'; Cordaz (red card) 76' | Stadium: Stadio Olimpico di Torino; Attendance: 12,648; Referee: Gianluca Rocchi |
Note: Alex Cordaz was sent off while a substitute.

| 2 November 2014 10 | Torino | 0–0 | Atalanta | Turin |
| 15:00 CET (UTC+01:00) | | Report | Dramé (yellow card) 35'; Stendardo (yellow card) 38'; Migliaccio (yellow card) 60'; Baselli (yellow card) 64'; Carmona (yellow card) 88' | Stadium: Stadio Olimpico di Torino; Attendance: 13,489; Referee: Angelo Cervellera |

| 9 November 2014 11 | Roma | 3–0 | Torino | Rome |
| 20:45 CET (UTC+01:00) | Torosidis 8'; Totti (yellow card) 10'; Keita 27'; Ljajić 58' | Report | Quagliarella (yellow card) 22'; Gazzi (yellow card) 58' | Stadium: Stadio Olimpico; Attendance: 35,770; Referee: Luca Banti |

| 23 November 2014 12 | Torino | 0–1 | Sassuolo | Turin |
| 12:30 CET (UTC+01:00) | Peres (yellow card) 45+1'; Gazzi (yellow card) 58' | Report | Cannavaro (yellow card) 28'; Zaza (yellow card) 45+1'; Peluso (yellow card) 75'; Floro Flores 87' | Stadium: Stadio Olimpico di Torino; Attendance: 15,528; Referee: Nicola Rizzoli |

| 30 November 2014 13 | Juventus | 2–1 | Torino | Turin |
| 18:00 CET (UTC+01:00) | Vidal 15' (pen.); Pogba (yellow card) 59'; Lichtsteiner (yellow card) 71' (yellow-red card) 78'; Pirlo 90+3' | Report | Glik (yellow card) 17'; Peres 22'; Gazzi (yellow card) 46'; Amauri (yellow card) 71'; Moretti (yellow card) 90+1' | Stadium: Juventus Stadium; Attendance: 38,899; Referee: Daniele Orsato |

| 6 December 2014 14 | Torino | 2–2 | Palermo | Turin |
| 20:45 CET (UTC+01:00) | Peres (yellow card) 30'; Martínez 35'; Glik 63' | Report | Rigoni 16', (yellow card) 84'; Lazaar (yellow card) 30'; Dybala 43'; Chochev (yellow card) 45+2' | Stadium: Stadio Olimpico di Torino; Attendance: 13,974; Referee: Piero Giacomelli |

| 15 December 2014 15 | Empoli | 0–0 | Torino | Empoli |
| 19:00 CET (UTC+01:00) | Vecino (yellow card) 4'; Mário Rui (yellow card) 69' | Report | Gazzi (yellow card) 17'; Jansson (yellow card) 32' (yellow-red card) 90+1'; Moretti (yellow card) 55'; El Kaddouri (yellow card) 79' | Stadium: Stadio Carlo Castellani; Attendance: 7,796; Referee: Gianpaolo Calvarese |

| 21 December 2014 16 | Torino | 2–1 | Genoa | Turin |
| 15:00 CET (UTC+01:00) | Moretti (yellow card) 19'; Glik 52', 63' | Report | Falque (yellow card) 15', (goal) 42'; Burdisso (yellow card) 33'; Rincón (yellow card) 36'; Marchese (yellow card) 55' | Stadium: Stadio Olimpico di Torino; Attendance: 15,611; Referee: Dino Tommasi |

| 6 January 2015 17 | Chievo | 0–0 | Torino | Verona |
| 15:00 CET (UTC+01:00) | Meggiorini (yellow card) 26'; Hetemaj (yellow card) 45' | Report | Vives (yellow card) 40'; Farnerud (yellow card) 59'; Gazzi (yellow card) 88' | Stadium: Stadio Marc'Antonio Bentegodi; Attendance: 6,000; Referee: Rosario Abisso |

| 10 January 2015 18 | Torino | 1–1 | Milan | Turin |
| 20:45 CET (UTC+01:00) | Glik (yellow card) 16', (goal) 81' | Report | Ménez 3' (pen.); De Sciglio (yellow card) 30' (yellow-red card) 45+3'; Niang (yellow card) 42'; Muntari (yellow card) 46'; Bonaventura (yellow card) 84' | Stadium: Stadio Olimpico di Torino; Attendance: 24,424; Referee: Gianluca Rocchi |

| 18 January 2015 19 | Cesena | 2–3 | Torino | Cesena |
| 15:00 CET (UTC+01:00) | Perico (yellow card) 30'; Brienza 43' (pen.), 85' (pen.); Zé Eduardo (yellow card) 61'; De Feudis (yellow card) 76'; Giorgi (yellow card) 80'; Defrel (yellow card) 90' | Report | Benassi 20', (yellow card) 58'; Quagliarella 22'; Padelli (yellow card) 42'; Peres (yellow card) 83'; Jansson (yellow card) 84'; Moretti (yellow card) 86'; López 87' | Stadium: Stadio Dino Manuzzi; Attendance: 14,910; Referee: Marco Guida |

| 25 January 2015 20 | Internazionale | 0–1 | Torino | Milan |
| 15:00 CET (UTC+01:00) | D'Ambrosio (yellow card) 52'; Icardi (yellow card) 79' | Report | Gazzi (yellow card) 75'; Darmian (yellow card) 86'; Moretti 90+4' | Stadium: San Siro; Attendance: 34,209; Referee: Massimiliano Irrati |

| 1 February 2015 21 | Torino | 5–1 | Sampdoria | Turin |
| 15:00 CET (UTC+01:00) | Quagliarella 16', 29' (pen.), 65'; Gazzi (yellow card) 17'; Amauri 75'; Peres 90+3' | Report | Silvestre (yellow card) 29'; De Silvestri (yellow card) 41'; Obiang 77' | Stadium: Stadio Olimpico di Torino; Attendance: 14,401; Referee: Piero Giacomelli |

| 7 February 2015 22 | Hellas Verona | 1–3 | Torino | Verona |
| 18:00 CET (UTC+01:00) | Marques (yellow card) 49'; Toni 83' | Report | Glik (yellow card) 23'; Martínez 32'; Bovo (yellow card) 38'; Quagliarella 50' (pen.); Padelli (yellow card) 90'; El Kaddouri 90+2' | Stadium: Stadio Marc'Antonio Bentegodi; Attendance: 17,038; Referee: Michael Fabbri |

| 15 February 2015 23 | Torino | 1–1 | Cagliari | Turin |
| 15:00 CET (UTC+01:00) | El Kaddouri 35', (yellow card) 63'; Glik (yellow card) 43'; Bovo (yellow card) 55' | Report | Donsah 34'; Conti (yellow card) 54'; Rossettini (yellow card) 57'; João Pedro (yellow card) 89' | Stadium: Stadio Olimpico di Torino; Attendance: 15,554; Referee: Gianpaolo Calvarese |

| 22 February 2015 24 | Fiorentina | 1–1 | Torino | Florence |
| 20:45 CET (UTC+01:00) | Diamanti (yellow card) 34'; Salah 85' | Report | Vives (yellow card) 10', (goal) 87'; Peres (yellow card) 35'; Benassi (yellow card) 49'; Moretti (yellow card) 58' | Stadium: Stadio Artemio Franchi; Attendance: 27,088; Referee: Marco Guida |

| 1 March 2015 25 | Torino | 1–0 | Napoli | Turin |
| 20:45 CET (UTC+01:00) | El Kaddouri (yellow card) 29'; Glik 68'; Quagliarella (yellow card) 72' | Report | Gargano (yellow card) 34'; Koulibaly (yellow card) 71'; Maggio (yellow card) 82' | Stadium: Stadio Olimpico di Torino; Attendance: 20,274; Referee: Massimiliano Irrati |

| 8 March 2015 26 | Udinese | 3–2 | Torino | Udine |
| 15:00 CET (UTC+01:00) | Di Natale 17'; Molinaro 25' (o.g.); Pasquale (yellow card) 29'; Wagué 49'; Kone (yellow card) 53'; Pinzi (yellow card) 65' | Report | Quagliarella 15'; Gazzi (yellow card) 31'; Benassi (yellow card) 64', (goal) 69' | Stadium: Stadio Friuli; Attendance: 8,519; Referee: Nicola Rizzoli |

| 16 March 2015 27 | Torino | 0–2 | Lazio | Turin |
| 19:00 CET (UTC+01:00) | Maksimović (yellow card) 28'; Amauri (yellow card) 39'; El Kaddouri (yellow card) 51' | Report | Radu (yellow card) 49'; Felipe Anderson 71', 78'; Basta (yellow card) 86' | Stadium: Stadio Olimpico di Torino; Attendance: 12,932; Referee: Daniele Orsato |

| 22 March 2015 28 | Parma | 0–2 | Torino | Parma |
| 20:45 CET (UTC+01:00) | Lucarelli (yellow card) 36' (yellow-red card) 36'; Cassani (yellow card) 45+1'; Jorquera (yellow card) 48' | Report | López 18'; Benassi (yellow card) 43'; El Kaddouri (yellow card) 45+1'; Basha 73' | Stadium: Stadio Ennio Tardini; Attendance: 10,145; Referee: Maurizio Mariani |

| 4 April 2015 29 | Atalanta | 1–2 | Torino | Bergamo |
| 15:00 CEST (UTC+02:00) | Carmona (yellow card) 45'; Migliaccio (yellow card) 57'; Masiello (yellow card) 70'; Pinilla 74', (red card) 90+2' | Report | Quagliarella 20'; Glik 39'; Peres (yellow card) 45+1'; Amauri (yellow card) 65'; Darmian (yellow card) 71'; Gazzi (yellow card) 74'; Padelli (yellow card) 87'; Basha (red card) 90+2' | Stadium: Stadio Atleti Azzurri d'Italia; Attendance: 15,718; Referee: Marco Guida |

| 12 April 2015 30 | Torino | 1–1 | Roma | Turin |
| 15:00 CEST (UTC+02:00) | Vives (yellow card) 30'; Maksimović (yellow card) 47'; Moretti (yellow card) 56'; López 64'; El Kaddouri (yellow card) 72'; Gazzi (yellow card) 79' | Report | Iturbe (yellow card) 37'; De Rossi (yellow card) 56'; Florenzi 57' (pen.); Manolas (yellow card) 90+4' | Stadium: Stadio Olimpico di Torino; Attendance: 19,317; Referee: Massimiliano Irrati |

| 19 April 2015 31 | Sassuolo | 1–1 | Torino | Reggio Emilia |
| 12:30 CEST (UTC+02:00) | Berardi (yellow card) 31', (goal) 45+1' (pen.); Acerbi (yellow card) 61' | Report | Vives (yellow card) 45+3'; Quagliarella 59' (pen.); Farnerud (yellow card) 75'; Basha (yellow card) 90+2' | Stadium: Mapei Stadium – Città del Tricolore; Attendance: 12,500; Referee: Gianpaolo Calvarese |

| 26 April 2015 32 | Torino | 2–1 | Juventus | Turin |
| 15:00 CEST (UTC+02:00) | Darmian 45'; Quagliarella 57'; Gazzi (yellow card) 60'; Moretti (yellow card) 70'; Vives (yellow card) 88' | Report | Pirlo 35'; Bonucci (yellow card) 77' | Stadium: Stadio Olimpico di Torino; Attendance: 26,296; Referee: Paolo Tagliavento |

| 29 April 2015 33 | Palermo | 2–2 | Torino | Palermo |
| 20:45 CEST (UTC+02:00) | Vitiello 10'; Rigoni 26'; Chochev (yellow card) 49'; Rispoli (yellow card) 55' | Report | Peres 13'; López 60', (yellow card) 90'; Vives (yellow card) 74'; Silva (yellow card) 76' | Stadium: Stadio Renzo Barbera; Attendance: 15,238; Referee: Andrea Gervasoni |

| 6 May 2015 34 | Torino | 0–1 | Empoli | Turin |
| 15:00 CEST (UTC+02:00) | Glik (yellow card) 59'; González (yellow card) 66'; Peres (yellow card) 90+2' | Report | Padelli 3' (o.g.); Mário Rui (yellow card) 65' | Stadium: Stadio Olimpico di Torino; Attendance: 11,000; Referee: Dino Tommasi |

| 11 May 2015 35 | Genoa | 5–1 | Torino | Genoa |
| 20:45 CEST (UTC+02:00) | Falque 18'; De Maio (yellow card) 66'; Costa 69', 90+5'; Roncaglia (yellow card) 77'; Bertolacci 87'; Pavoletti 90+2' | Report | López (yellow card) 39'; Peres (yellow card) 56'; El Kaddouri 61'; Moretti (yellow card) 68'; Amauri (yellow card) 88' | Stadium: Stadio Luigi Ferraris; Attendance: 20,282; Referee: Daniele Orsato |

| 17 May 2015 36 | Torino | 2–0 | Chievo | Turin |
| 15:00 CEST (UTC+02:00) | Maksimović (yellow card) 18'; Silva (yellow card) 45+3'; López 51', 69'; Moretti (yellow card) 52' | Report | | Stadium: Stadio Olimpico di Torino; Attendance: 15,281; Referee: Gianluca Rocchi |

| 24 May 2015 37 | Milan | 3–0 | Torino | Milan |
| 20:45 CEST (UTC+02:00) | Honda (yellow card) 11'; El Shaarawy 18', 65'; Zaccardo (red card) 43'; Poli (yellow card) 45'; Pazzini 57' (pen.), (yellow card) 63'; Van Ginkel (yellow card) 78' | Report | Gazzi (yellow card) 40'; Moretti (yellow card) 51'; Molinaro (red card) 56' | Stadium: San Siro; Attendance: 33,818; Referee: Paolo Valeri |

| 31 May 2015 38 | Torino | 5–0 | Cesena | Turin |
| 20:45 CEST (UTC+02:00) | Martínez 10'; López 16', 70'; Benassi 31'; Moretti 49' | Report | Defrel (yellow card) 55'; Volta (yellow card) 61' | Stadium: Stadio Olimpico di Torino; Attendance: 18,569; Referee: Aleandro Di Paolo |

=== Coppa Italia ===
| 14 January 2015 Round of 16 | Torino | 1–3 | Lazio | Turin |
| 21:00 CET (UTC+01:00) | Amauri (yellow card) 42'; Martínez 49', (yellow card) 90'; Padelli (red card) 55'; Gazzi (yellow card) 77' | Report | Keita 12'; Klose 29'; Cavanda (yellow card) 52'; Ledesma 57' (pen.) | Stadium: Stadio Olimpico di Torino; Referee: Carmine Russo |

=== UEFA Europa League ===
==== Third qualifying round ====
| 31 July 2014 First leg | Brommapojkarna (Sweden) | 0–3 | (Italy) Torino | Stockholm, Sweden |
| 19:00 CEST (UTC+02:00) | Segerström (red card) 44' | Report | Larrondo 45' (pen.), 53'; Barreto 58'; Vives (red card) 61' | Stadium: Tele2 Arena; Attendance: 2,043; Referee: Serdar Gözübüyük (Netherlands) |

| 8 August 2014 Second leg | Torino (Italy) | 4–0 (7–0 agg.) | (Sweden) Brommapojkarna | Turin, Italy |
| 20:30 CEST (UTC+02:00) | Jónsson 4' (o.g.); Darmian 37'; Quagliarella 80' (pen.); Martínez 90' | Report | Karlström (yellow card) 68' | Stadium: Stadio Olimpico di Torino; Attendance: 22,931; Referee: Paweł Raczkowski (Poland) |

==== Play-off round ====
| 21 August 2014 First leg | RNK Split (Croatia) | 0–0 | (Italy) Torino | Dugopolje, Croatia |
| 20:30 CEST (UTC+02:00) | Bagarić (yellow card) 69'; Rugašević (yellow card) 84'; Vidović (yellow card) 88' | Report | Glik (yellow card) 39'; Moretti (yellow card) 74'; El Kaddouri (yellow card) 84' | Stadium: Stadion Hrvatski vitezovi Referee: Steven McLean (Scotland) |

| 28 August 2014 Second leg | Torino (Italy) | 1–0 (1–0 agg.) | (Croatia) RNK Split | Turin, Italy |
| 20:30 CEST (UTC+02:00) | El Kaddouri 22' (pen.), (yellow card) 58'; Vives (yellow card) 45+1' | Report | Ibriks (yellow card) 24'; Glavina (yellow card) 40' | Stadium: Stadio Olimpico di Torino; Attendance: 20,857; Referee: Anastasios Sidiropoulos (Greece) |

==== Group stage ====
| Pos | Team | Pld | W | D | L | GF | GA | GD | Pts | Qualification | BRU | TOR | HJK | KOB |
|---|---|---|---|---|---|---|---|---|---|---|---|---|---|---|
| 1 | (Belgium) Club Brugge | 6 | 3 | 3 | 0 | 10 | 2 | +8 | 12 | Advance to knockout phase | — | 0–0 | 2–1 | 1–1 |
| 2 | (Italy) Torino | 6 | 3 | 2 | 1 | 9 | 3 | +6 | 11 | Advance to knockout phase | 0–0 | — | 2–0 | 1–0 |
| 3 | (Finland) HJK | 6 | 2 | 0 | 4 | 5 | 11 | −6 | 6 | | 0–3 | 2–1 | — | 2–1 |
| 4 | (Denmark) Copenhagen | 6 | 1 | 1 | 4 | 5 | 13 | −8 | 4 | | 0–4 | 1–5 | 2–0 | — |

Source: Soccerway
Rules for classification: Group stage tiebreakers

| 18 September 2014 1 | Club Brugge (Belgium) | 0–0 | (Italy) Torino | Bruges, Belgium |
| 19:00 CEST (UTC+02:00) | Meunier (yellow card) 62' | Report | El Kaddouri (yellow card) 76'; Molinaro (yellow card) 85' | Stadium: Jan Breydelstadion; Attendance: 15,000; Referee: Halis Özkahya (Turkey) |

| 2 October 2014 2 | Torino (Italy) | 1–0 | (Denmark) Copenhagen | Turin, Italy |
| 21:05 CEST (UTC+02:00) | Benassi (yellow card) 54'; Molinaro (yellow card) 77'; Quagliarella 90+4' (pen.) | Report | Gíslason (yellow card) 61'; Antonsson (yellow card) 90+3' | Stadium: Stadio Olimpico di Torino; Attendance: 15,000; Referee: Carlos Clos Gómez (Spain) |

| 23 October 2014 3 | Torino (Italy) | 2–0 | (Finland) HJK | Turin, Italy |
| 21:05 CEST (UTC+02:00) | Molinaro 35'; Amauri 58'; Quagliarella (yellow card) 68' | Report | Annan (yellow card) 43'; Savage (yellow card) 83'; Kandji (yellow card) 85' | Stadium: Stadio Olimpico di Torino; Attendance: 10,000; Referee: Stephan Klossner (Switzerland) |

| 6 November 2014 4 | HJK (Finland) | 2–1 | (Italy) Torino | Helsinki, Finland |
| 19:00 CET (UTC+01:00) | Baah 60'; Moren 81'; Annan (yellow card) 90+5' | Report | El Kaddouri (yellow card) 83'; Quagliarella 90' | Stadium: Sonera-stadion; Attendance: 10,000; Referee: Arnold Hunter (Northern Ireland) |

| 27 November 2014 5 | Torino (Italy) | 0–0 | (Belgium) Club Brugge | Turin, Italy |
| 21:05 CET (UTC+01:00) | Benassi (yellow card) 38'; Moretti (yellow card) 51'; Gazzi (yellow card) 79'; Jansson (yellow card) 90+3'; Molinaro (yellow card) 90+5' | Report | Castillo (yellow card) 58'; De Bock (yellow card) 85'; Ryan (yellow card) 90'; Mechele (yellow card) 90+3' | Stadium: Stadio Olimpico di Torino; Attendance: 10,000; Referee: Bas Nijhuis (Netherlands) |

| 11 December 2014 6 | Copenhagen (Denmark) | 1–5 | (Italy) Torino | Copenhagen, Denmark |
| 19:00 CET (UTC+01:00) | Amartey 6'; Antonsson (red card) 30'; M. Jørgensen (red card) 40' | Report | Martínez 15', 47'; Amauri 42' (pen.); Darmian 49'; Silva 53' | Stadium: Telia Parken; Attendance: 9,202; Referee: Vladislav Bezborodov (Russia) |

==== Knockout phase ====
===== Round of 32 =====
| 19 February 2015 First leg | Torino (Italy) | 2–2 | (Spain) Athletic Bilbao | Turin, Italy |
| 19:00 CET (UTC+01:00) | López 18', 42'; Benassi (yellow card) 71'; Farnerud (yellow card) 90'; Darmian (yellow card) 90+4' | Report | Williams 8'; Gurpegui 72'; Beñat (yellow card) 76' | Stadium: Stadio Olimpico di Torino; Attendance: 25,725; Referee: Michael Koukoulakis (Greece) |

| 26 February 2015 Second leg | Athletic Bilbao (Spain) | 2–3 (4–5 agg.) | (Italy) Torino | Bilbao, Spain |
| 21:05 CET (UTC+01:00) | Etxeita (yellow card) 28'; Iraola 44'; Rico (yellow card) 45+2'; De Marcos 61'; Aduriz (yellow card) 70' | Report | Quagliarella 16'; López (yellow card) 39', (goal) 45+2'; Gazzi (yellow card) 48'; Darmian (yellow card) 53', (goal) 68'; Martínez (yellow card) 77' | Stadium: San Mamés; Attendance: 36,000; Referee: Liran Liany (Israel) |

===== Round of 16 =====
| 12 March 2015 First leg | Zenit Saint Petersburg (Russia) | 2–0 | (Italy) Torino | Saint Petersburg, Russia |
| 18:00 CET (UTC+01:00) | García (yellow card) 34'; Witsel 38'; Criscito 53'; Smolnikov (yellow card) 64'; Ryazantsev (yellow card) 87' | Report | Benassi (yellow card) 12' (yellow-red card) 28'; Glik (yellow card) 87'; Molinaro (yellow card) 90+4' | Stadium: Petrovsky Stadium; Attendance: 17,271; Referee: Jorge Sousa (Portugal) |

| 19 March 2015 Second leg | Torino (Italy) | 1–0 (1–2 agg.) | (Russia) Zenit Saint Petersburg | Turin, Italy |
| 21:05 CET (UTC+01:00) | Molinaro (yellow card) 20'; Quagliarella (yellow card) 52'; Gazzi (yellow card) 62'; Glik 90' | Report | Tymoshchuk (yellow card) 37'; Criscito (yellow card) 45'; Neto (yellow card) 48'; Danny (yellow card) 52'; Lodigin (yellow card) 58'; Smolnikov (yellow card) 86'; Hulk (yellow card) 89' | Stadium: Stadio Olimpico di Torino; Attendance: 24,736; Referee: Matej Jug (Slovenia) |

== Statistics ==
=== Appearances and goals ===
| No. | Pos | Nat | Player | Total | | Serie A | | Coppa Italia | | Europa League | |
| No. | Pos | Nat | Player | Apps | Goals | Apps | Goals | Apps | Goals | Apps | Goals |
Goalkeepers
| 1 | GK | (Uruguay) URU | Salvador Ichazo | 1 | 0 | 1 | 0 | 0 | 0 | 0 | 0 |
| 13 | GK | (Italy) ITA | Luca Castellazzi | 0 | 0 | 0 | 0 | 0 | 0 | 0 | 0 |
| 30 | GK | (Italy) ITA | Daniele Padelli | 37 | 0 | 25 | 0 | 0 | 0 | 12 | 0 |
| 74 | GK | (Italy) ITA | Andrea Zaccagno | 0 | 0 | 0 | 0 | 0 | 0 | 0 | 0 |
Defenders
| 3 | DF | (Italy) ITA | Cristian Molinaro | 37 | 1 | 17+7 | 0 | 0 | 0 | 12+1 | 1 |
| 5 | DF | (Italy) ITA | Cesare Bovo | 21 | 0 | 14+1 | 0 | 0 | 0 | 5+1 | 0 |
| 18 | DF | (Sweden) SWE | Pontus Jansson | 15 | 0 | 7+2 | 0 | 0 | 0 | 4+2 | 0 |
| 19 | DF | (Serbia) SRB | Nikola Maksimović | 36 | 0 | 27 | 0 | 0 | 0 | 9 | 0 |
| 21 | DF | (Uruguay) URU | Gastón Silva | 9 | 1 | 4+1 | 0 | 0 | 0 | 4 | 1 |
| 24 | DF | (Italy) ITA | Emiliano Moretti | 46 | 2 | 35 | 2 | 0 | 0 | 11 | 0 |
| 25 | DF | (Poland) POL | Kamil Glik | 43 | 8 | 31+1 | 7 | 0 | 0 | 11 | 1 |
| 32 | DF | (Italy) ITA | Salvatore Masiello | 2 | 0 | 0+1 | 0 | 0 | 0 | 1 | 0 |
| 33 | DF | (Brazil) BRA | Bruno Peres | 34 | 3 | 28+6 | 3 | 0 | 0 | 0 | 0 |
| 36 | DF | (Italy) ITA | Matteo Darmian | 46 | 5 | 28+5 | 2 | 0 | 0 | 13 | 3 |
Midfielders
| 4 | MF | (Albania) ALB | Migjen Basha | 6 | 1 | 1+5 | 1 | 0 | 0 | 0 | 0 |
| 7 | MF | (Morocco) MAR | Omar El Kaddouri | 45 | 4 | 25+7 | 3 | 0 | 0 | 10+3 | 1 |
| 8 | MF | (Sweden) SWE | Alexander Farnerud | 26 | 1 | 15+7 | 1 | 0 | 0 | 1+3 | 0 |
| 14 | MF | (Italy) ITA | Alessandro Gazzi | 40 | 0 | 27+3 | 0 | 0 | 0 | 9+1 | 0 |
| 15 | MF | (Uruguay) URU | Álvaro González | 4 | 0 | 1+3 | 0 | 0 | 0 | 0 | 0 |
| 20 | MF | (Italy) ITA | Giuseppe Vives | 35 | 1 | 26+2 | 1 | 0 | 0 | 5+2 | 0 |
| 91 | MF | (Italy) ITA | Giovanni Graziano | 1 | 0 | 0 | 0 | 0 | 0 | 0+1 | 0 |
| 94 | MF | (Italy) ITA | Marco Benassi | 36 | 3 | 17+8 | 3 | 0 | 0 | 9+2 | 0 |
Forwards
| 10 | FW | (Brazil) BRA | Barreto | 6 | 1 | 0+1 | 0 | 0 | 0 | 4+1 | 1 |
| 11 | FW | (Argentina) ARG | Maxi López | 22 | 11 | 8+10 | 8 | 0 | 0 | 3+1 | 3 |
| 17 | FW | (Venezuela) VEN | Josef Martínez | 39 | 6 | 20+6 | 3 | 0 | 0 | 7+6 | 3 |
| 22 | FW | (Italy) ITA | Amauri | 27 | 3 | 7+13 | 1 | 0 | 0 | 5+2 | 2 |
| 27 | FW | (Italy) ITA | Fabio Quagliarella | 46 | 17 | 33+1 | 13 | 0 | 0 | 6+6 | 4 |
| 45 | FW | (Argentina) ARG | Facundo Lescano | 1 | 0 | 0+1 | 0 | 0 | 0 | 0 | 0 |
| 90 | FW | (Italy) ITA | Simone Rosso | 2 | 0 | 0+2 | 0 | 0 | 0 | 0 | 0 |
Players transferred out during the season
| 1 | GK | (Belgium) BEL | Jean-François Gillet | 14 | 0 | 12 | 0 | 0 | 0 | 2 | 0 |
| 6 | MF | (Spain) ESP | Rubén Pérez | 8 | 0 | 0+6 | 0 | 0 | 0 | 1+1 | 0 |
| 9 | FW | (Argentina) ARG | Marcelo Larrondo | 11 | 2 | 3+2 | 0 | 0 | 0 | 3+3 | 2 |
| 23 | MF | (Italy) ITA | Antonio Nocerino | 11 | 0 | 2+3 | 0 | 0 | 0 | 3+3 | 0 |
| 28 | MF | (Argentina) ARG | Juan Sánchez Miño | 14 | 0 | 4+7 | 0 | 0 | 0 | 3 | 0 |
| 29 | DF | (Montenegro) MNE | Marko Vešović | 1 | 0 | 0 | 0 | 0 | 0 | 1 | 0 |

Last updated: 30 May 2015
Source: BDFutbol
