= 2013–14 Torino FC season =

Torino
2013–14 season
- President: Urbano Cairo
- Manager: Giampiero Ventura
- Stadium: Stadio Olimpico di Torino
- Serie A: 7th
- Coppa Italia: Third round
- Top goalscorer: League: Ciro Immobile (22); All: Ciro Immobile (23)
- Highest home attendance: 25,559 vs Parma
- Lowest home attendance: 12,572 vs Livorno
- Average home league attendance: 17,024
Home colours	Away colours	Third colours

The 2013–14 season was Torino Football Club's 103rd season of competitive football, 86th season in the top division of Italian football and 69th season in Serie A.

== Season overview ==
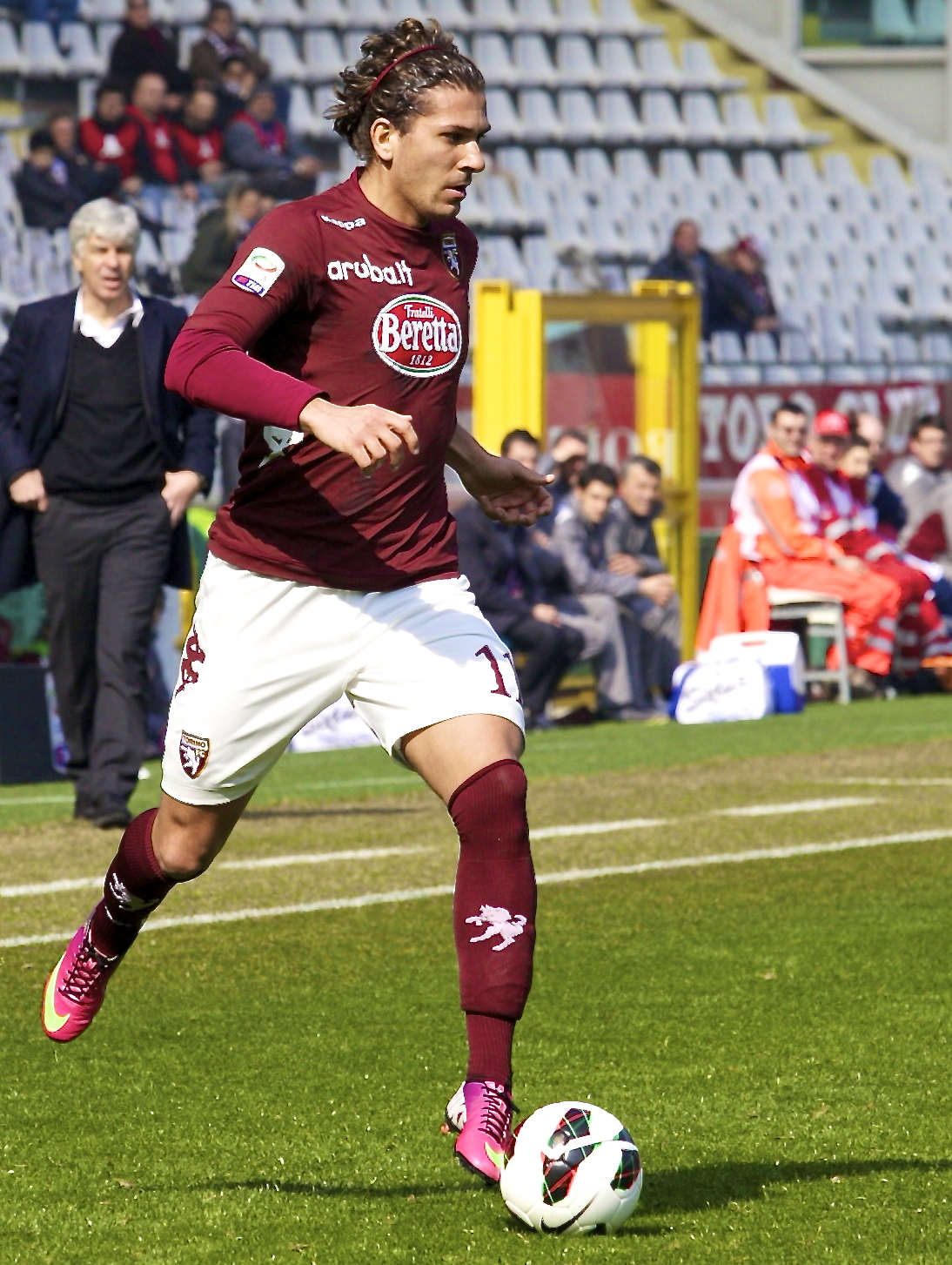
Alessio Cerci, author of an excellent season in Granata and one of the architects of the qualification to the UEFA Europa League

Giampiero Ventura was confirmed for another season while Torino spent its summer retreat in Bormio, during which youth products Marco Sordi, Vittorio Parigini and Mattia Aramu were aggregated to the first team.

During the 2013–14 season, the club played its best season in the top flight since 1991–92 Serie A – in which the team placed third, with 43 points – finishing in seventh place thanks to goals from Alessio Cerci and the new signing Ciro Immobile, who became (together with Juventus attacking pair Carlos Tevez and Fernando Llorente) the most prolific strike partnership in Serie A with 35 goals total. Immobile, in particular, finished the season as the Capocannoniere with 22 goals, Torino's first since Francesco Graziani in 1976–77. In Coppa Italia the team was instead eliminated in the third round by Pescara.

At the end of the season, after failing to qualify for a UEFA Europa League placement on the field, Torino was later admitted to the competition after exclusion of Parma, who finished sixth but failed to obtain a UEFA license: Thus, Torino found themselves on the continental stage for the first time since the Intertoto Cup of 2002 and, in terms of major competitions, the Cup Winners' Cup in 1994.

== Transfers ==
Leaving the team after five years was captain Rolando Bianchi, who do not renew his expiring contract, and Mario Santana, who returned to Napoli at the end of his loan.

Even before the official opening of the transfer market, the purchases of goalkeeper Daniele Padelli and midfielder Alexander Farnerud were made official; the co-ownerships of the defenders Matteo Darmian and Kamil Glik and midfielders Migjen Basha, Alessio Cerci and Alen Stevanović were resolved in favour of Torino, while the co-ownership with Udinese for the striker Barreto was renewed for another season. Matteo Rubin became full property of Siena.

The official start of the transfer window was heavily influenced by the proceedings of the 2011–12 Italian football scandal: Barreto and Alessandro Gazzi were suspended for three months and ten days, while Jean-François Gillet was initially sentenced to a three years and seven-month ban, then reduced by the TNAS to 13 months.

The market saw the arrival of defenders Cesare Bovo and Emiliano Moretti from Genoa and midfielders Nicola Bellomo from Bari and Omar El Kaddouri from Napoli. During the pre-season retreat, the purchase of Serbian international defender Nikola Maksimović on loan was made official. Angelo Ogbonna, however, after 11 years at Torino between the youth and the first team, was sold to Juventus, while as partial compensation, Italy under-21 striker Ciro Immobile joined Torino; On 8 July, after mutually terminating his contract with Roma, Matteo Brighi returned to Torino. Three days later, Alen Stevanović was loaned with a buying option to Palermo, in Serie B. On 30 July, a co-ownership deal was completed with Siena for the striker Marcelo Larrondo, who would complement the offensive department. On 8 August, after three seasons, the defender Valerio Di Cesare left Torino to move outright to Brescia.

On 31 August, the last day of the transfer window, left back Giovanni Pasquale was signed on loan from Udinese and Tommaso Berni was signed on a free transfer, to serve as the third goalkeeper.

=== Summer 2013 ===
==== In ====
First Team
Position	Player	From club	Transfer fee
GK	Tommaso Berni		outright
GK	Lys Gomis	Ascoli	end of loan
GK	Daniele Padelli	Udinese	outright
DF	Cesare Bovo	Genoa	outright
DF	Matteo Darmian	Palermo	co-ownership resolved
DF	Kamil Glik	Palermo	co-ownership resolved
DF	Nikola Maksimović	Apollon Limassol	on loan
DF	Emiliano Moretti	Genoa	outright
DF	Giovanni Pasquale	Udinese	on loan
DF	Filippo Scaglia	Cuneo	end of loan
MF	Migjen Basha	Atalanta	outright
MF	Nicola Bellomo	Bari	co-ownership
MF	Matteo Brighi	Roma	outright
MF	Alessio Cerci	Fiorentina	co-ownership resolved
MF	Omar El Kaddouri	Napoli	on loan / buying option
MF	Alexander Farnerud	Young Boys	outright
MF	Alen Stevanović	Internazionale	co-ownership resolved
FW	Ciro Immobile	Juventus	co-ownership
FW	Marcelo Larrondo	Siena	co-ownership

Reserves and youth
Position	Player	From club	Transfer fee
DF	Marco Chiosa	Nocerina	end of loan
DF	Luca Isoardi	Vallée d'Aoste	co-ownership resolved
MF	Nicolas Gorobsov	Nocerina	end of loan
MF	Vincenzo Nitride	Monza	co-ownership resolved
MF	Sergiu Suciu	Juve Stabia	end of loan
MF	Simone Verdi	Juve Stabia	end of loan

==== Out ====
First Team
Position	Player	From club	Transfer fee
GK	Ferdinando Coppola		end of contract
GK	Alfred Gomis	Crotone	loan
DF	Pablo Cáceres	Rangers de Talca	end of loan
DF	Valerio Di Cesare	Brescia	outright
DF	Angelo Ogbonna	Juventus	outright
MF	Marko Bakić	Fiorentina	co-ownership resolved
MF	Willyan	Beira-Mar	loan
MF	Valter Birsa	Genoa	end of loan
MF	Matteo Brighi	Roma	end of loan
MF	Mario Santana	Napoli	end of loan
MF	Alen Stevanović	Palermo	on loan / buying option
FW	Rolando Bianchi		end of contract
FW	Abou Diop	Juve Stabia	loan
FW	Jonathas	Pescara	end of loan
FW	Dolly Menga	Lierse	end of loan
FW	Vittorio Parigini	Juve Stabia	loan

Reserves and youth
Position	Player	From club	Transfer fee
DF	Alessandro Agostini	Verona	outright
DF	Simone Benedetti	Internazionale	co-ownership resolved
DF	Marco Chiosa	Bari	loan
DF	Davide Cinaglia	FeralpiSalò	co-ownership
DF	Andrea Cristini	Cuneo	end of loan
DF	Riccardo Fiamozzi	Varese	co-ownership
DF	Francesco Fiore	Vallée d'Aoste	outright
DF	Luca Isoardi	Bra	loan
DF	Marco Migliorini	Como	outright
DF	Gabriele Quitadamo	Cuneo	end of loan
DF	Paolo Ropolo	Gavorrano	outright
DF	Matteo Rubin	Siena	co-ownership resolved
MF	Boubakary Diarra	Bra	loan
MF	Marco Firriolo	Cuneo	co-ownership
MF	Giorgio Fumana	Bra	loan
MF	Emanuele Gatto	Lumezzane	co-ownership
MF	Nicolas Gorobsov	Poli Timișoara	loan
MF	Vincenzo Nitride	Bra	co-ownership
MF	Sergiu Suciu	Juve Stabia	loan
FW	Nathan Kabasele	Anderlecht	end of loan
FW	Simone Verdi	Empoli	loan

=== Winter 2013–14 ===
==== In ====
First Team
Position	Player	From club	Transfer fee
DF	Marko Vešović		outright
MF	Jasmin Kurtić	Sassuolo	on loan
MF	Panagiotis Tachtsidis	Catania	on loan

Reserves and youth
Position	Player	From club	Transfer fee
MF	Ahmed Barusso	Genoa	outright
MF	Boubakary Diarra	Bra	end of loan
FW	Matteo Colombi	Internazionale	loan
FW	Abou Diop	Juve Stabia	end of loan
FW	Ilyos Zeytullayev		outright

==== Out ====
First Team
Position	Player	From club	Transfer fee
DF	Danilo D'Ambrosio	Internazionale	outright
DF	Filippo Scaglia	Cittadella	on loan / buying option
MF	Matteo Brighi	Sassuolo	outright
MF	Nicola Bellomo	Spezia	loan

Reserves and youth
Position	Player	From club	Transfer fee
MF	Willyan	Beira-Mar	outright
FW	Abou Diop	Crotone	on loan / buying option
FW	Ilyos Zeytullayev	Gorica	loan

== Players ==
=== Squad information ===
Note: Flags indicate national team as defined under FIFA eligibility rules; some limited exceptions apply. Players may hold more than one non-FIFA nationality.

No.	Pos.	Nation	Player
1	GK	(Belgium) BEL	Jean-François Gillet
2	DF	(Uruguay) URU	Guillermo Rodríguez
3	DF	(Italy) ITA	Danilo D'Ambrosio
4	MF	(Albania) ALB	Migjen Basha
5	DF	(Italy) ITA	Cesare Bovo
7	MF	(Morocco) MAR	Omar El Kaddouri (on loan from Napoli)
8	MF	(Sweden) SWE	Alexander Farnerud
9	FW	(Italy) ITA	Ciro Immobile
10	FW	(Brazil) BRA	Barreto
11	MF	(Italy) ITA	Alessio Cerci
14	MF	(Italy) ITA	Alessandro Gazzi
16	FW	(Argentina) ARG	Marcelo Larrondo
17	DF	(Italy) ITA	Salvatore Masiello
19	DF	(Serbia) SRB	Nikola Maksimović (on loan from Red Star Belgrade)
20	MF	(Italy) ITA	Giuseppe Vives
22	DF	(Italy) ITA	Marco Chiosa
23	GK	(Senegal) SEN	Lys Gomis
24	DF	(Italy) ITA	Emiliano Moretti

No.	Pos.	Nation	Player
25	DF	(Poland) POL	Kamil Glik (captain)
26	DF	(Italy) ITA	Giovanni Pasquale (on loan from Udinese)
27	MF	(Slovenia) SVN	Jasmin Kurtić (on loan from Sassuolo)
29	DF	(Italy) ITA	Filippo Scaglia
29	DF	(Montenegro) MNE	Marko Vešović
30	GK	(Italy) ITA	Daniele Padelli
31	MF	(Ghana) GHA	Emmanuel Gyasi
32	GK	(Italy) ITA	Tommaso Berni
33	MF	(Italy) ITA	Matteo Brighi
34	DF	(Italy) ITA	Antonio Barreca
36	DF	(Italy) ITA	Matteo Darmian
49	MF	(Italy) ITA	Mattia Aramu
51	MF	(Italy) ITA	Alessandro Comentale
63	MF	(Italy) ITA	Nicola Bellomo
69	FW	(Italy) ITA	Riccardo Meggiorini
77	MF	(Greece) GRE	Panagiotis Tachtsidis (on loan from Catania)
—	MF	(Ghana) GHA	Ahmed Barusso
—	FW	(Uzbekistan) UZB	Ilyos Zeytullayev

== Competitions ==
=== Serie A ===
The season will start on 24 August 2013 and conclude on 18 May 2014.

==== League table ====
Pos	Team	Pld	W	D	L	GF	GA	GD	Pts	Qualification or relegation
5	Internazionale	38	15	15	8	62	39	+23	60	Qualification for the Europa League play-off round (Note: Since the 2013–14 Coppa Italia champions Napoli and runners–up Fiorentina qualified for the 2014–15 European football season thus 4th, 5th and 6th in Serie A (barring any failure to receive a "UEFA licence" from the FIGC or a ban from European competition) would qualify for group stage, play-off round and third qualifying round respectively.)
6	Parma	38	15	13	10	58	46	+12	58	
7	Torino	38	15	12	11	58	48	+10	57 (Note: Torino finished ahead of Milan on goal difference : Torino 2-2 Milan, Milan 1-1 Torino; Torino = +10, Milan = +8.)	Qualification for the Europa League third qualifying round (Note: The FIGC rejected the application of Parma for a UEFA license, because Parma had overdue tax debt; their place went to seventh-place Torino, which had a UEFA license.)
8	Milan	38	16	9	13	57	49	+8	57	
9	Lazio	38	15	11	12	54	54	0	56	

Source: Serie A, Soccerway
Rules for classification: 1st points; 2nd head-to-head points; 3rd head-to-head goal difference; 4th goal difference; 5th number of goals scored; 6th public draw.
(Head-to-head record is applied for clubs with the same number of points only once all matches between said clubs have been played)

==== Results summary ====
Overall								Home						Away					
Pld	W	D	L	GF	GA	GD	Pts	W	D	L	GF	GA	GD	W	D	L	GF	GA	GD
38	15	12	11	58	48	+10	57	9	6	4	31	20	+11	6	6	7	27	28	−1

Last updated: 4 May 2014.
Source: Competitive matches

==== Results by round ====
Round	1	2	3	4	5	6	7	8	9	10	11	12	13	14	15	16	17	18	19	20	21	22	23	24	25	26	27	28	29	30	31	32	33	34	35	36	37	38
Ground	H	A	H	A	H	A	H	A	H	A	H	A	H	A	H	A	H	A	H	A	H	A	H	A	H	A	H	A	H	A	H	A	H	A	H	A	H	A
Result	W	L	D	W	D	L	D	D	L	D	D	L	W	D	W	W	W	L	D	W	W	D	L	W	L	L	L	L	W	L	W	W	W	D	W	W	D	D
Position	4	10	11	7	8	10	9	10	12	12	12	14	12	12	7	7	7	7	7	7	6	7	7	7	8	9	9	10	10	11	10	10	7	8	6	6	6	7

Updated to match(es) played on 4 May 2014. Source: Competitive matches
A = Away; H = Home; W = Win; D = Draw; L = Loss

==== Matches ====
25 August 2013 1	Torino	2–0	Sassuolo	Turin
20:45 CEST (UTC+02:00)	Brighi 53'; Cerci 59'			Stadium: Stadio Olimpico di Torino; Attendance: 13,418; Referee: Daniele Orsato

1 September 2013 2	Atalanta	2–0	Torino	Bergamo
20:45 CEST (UTC+02:00)	Stendardo 57'; Lucchini 81'			Stadium: Stadio Atleti Azzurri d'Italia; Attendance: 12,745; Referee: Mauro Bergonzi

15 September 2013 3	Torino	2–2	Milan	Turin
20:45 CEST (UTC+02:00)	D'Ambrosio 43'; El Kaddouri (yellow card) 64'; Cerci 71'; Glik (yellow card) 88'		Zapata (yellow card) 45+1'; Muntari 87'; Poli (yellow card) 87'; Balotelli 90+7' (pen.)	Stadium: Stadio Olimpico di Torino; Attendance: 22,780; Referee: Davide Massa

22 September 2013 4	Bologna	1–2	Torino	Bologna
15:00 CEST (UTC+02:00)	Natali 29'		D'Ambrosio 2'; Cerci 45+1' (pen.)	Stadium: Stadio Renato Dall'Ara; Attendance: 21,931; Referee: Sebastiano Peruzzo

25 September 2013 5	Torino	2–2	Verona	Turin
20:45 CEST (UTC+02:00)	Cerci 36' (pen.), 52', (yellow card) 77'		Juanito 44'; Jorginho 67' (pen.)	Stadium: Stadio Olimpico di Torino; Attendance: 13,258; Referee: Nicola Rizzoli

29 September 2013 6	Torino	0–1	Juventus	Turin
12:30 CEST (UTC+02:00)	Immobile (yellow card) 36'; Vives (yellow card) 77'; Moretti (yellow card) 82'		Marchisio (yellow card) 19'; Pogba (yellow card) 25', (goal) 54'; Asamoah (yellow card) 60'	Stadium: Stadio Olimpico di Torino; Attendance: 18,982; Referee: Paolo Mazzoleni

6 October 2013 7	Sampdoria	2–2	Torino	Genoa
15:00 CET (UTC+01:00)	Quagliarella 16', 29' (pen.), 65'; Gazzi (yellow card) 17'; Amauri 75'; Peres 90+3'		Silvestre (yellow card) 29'; De Silvestri (yellow card) 41'; Obiang 77'	Stadium: Stadio Luigi Ferraris; Attendance: 20,492; Referee: Piero Giacomelli

20 October 2013 8	Torino	3–3	Internazionale	Turin
20:45 CEST (UTC+02:00)	Cerci (penalty missed) 7'; Gazzi (yellow card) 33'; Farnerud 21', (yellow card) 37'; Immobile 53', (yellow card) 80'; Bellomo 90'		Handanović (red card) 5'; Taïder (yellow card) 26'; Guarín 45+1'; Palacio 55', 71'; Cambiasso (yellow card) 78'	Stadium: Stadio Olimpico di Torino; Attendance: 20,881; Referee: Daniele Doveri

27 October 2013 9	Napoli	2–0	Torino	Naples
12:30 CEST (UTC+02:00)	Higuaín 14' (pen.), 32' (pen.); Fernández (yellow card) 45'		Basha (red card) 87'	Stadium: Stadio San Paolo; Attendance: 42,209; Referee: Andrea De Marco

30 October 2013 10	Livorno	3–3	Torino	Livorno
20:45 CET (UTC+01:00)	Paulinho 25'; L. Greco 33'; Emerson 62'		Immobile 4'; Glik 7'; Cerci 87' (pen.)	Stadium: Stadio Armando Picchi; Attendance: 9,359; Referee: Paolo Valeri

3 November 2013 11	Torino	1–1	Roma	Turin
20:45 CET (UTC+01:00)	Cerci 63'; D'Ambrosio (yellow card) 79'; Basha (yellow card) 87'		Benatia (yellow card) 26'; Strootman 28'; Bradley (yellow card) 53'; Maicon (yellow card) 90+4'	Stadium: Stadio Olimpico di Torino; Attendance: 16,276; Referee: Luca Banti

10 November 2013 12	Cagliari	2–1	Torino	Quartu Sant'Elena
15:00 CET (UTC+01:00)	Conti 43', 88'		Immobile 52'	Stadium: Stadio Is Arenas; Attendance: 4,500; Referee: Gianpaolo Calvarese

24 November 2013 13	Torino	4–1	Catania	Turin
15:00 CET (UTC+01:00)	Immobile 10'; El Kaddouri 34', 61'; Moretti 59'		Leto 50'	Stadium: Stadio Olimpico di Torino; Attendance: 13,856; Referee: Dino Tommasi

30 November 2013 14	Genoa	1–1	Torino	Genoa
20:45 CET (UTC+01:00)	Biondini 69'		Farnerud 7'	Stadium: Stadio Luigi Ferraris; Attendance: 19,262; Referee: Sebastiano Peruzzo

8 December 2013 15	Torino	1–0	Lazio	Turin
15:00 CET (UTC+01:00)	Glik 19'			Stadium: Stadio Olimpico di Torino; Attendance: 14,166; Referee: Paolo Tagliavento

15 December 2013 16	Udinese	0–2	Torino	Udine
15:00 CET (UTC+01:00)	Lazzari (yellow card) 21'; Naldo (yellow card) 59'		Maksimović (yellow card) 16'; Farnerud (yellow card) 40', (goal) 48'; Immobile 75', (yellow card) 79'	Stadium: Stadio Friuli; Attendance: 13,135; Referee: Massimiliano Irrati

22 December 2013 17	Torino	4–1	Chievo	Turin
15:00 CET (UTC+01:00)	Immobile 45+2', 65'; Vives 80'; Cerci 90+3'		Théréau 9'	Stadium: Stadio Olimpico di Torino; Attendance: 18,513; Referee: Andrea De Marco

10 March 2013 18	Parma	3–1	Torino	Parma
15:00 CET (UTC+01:00)	Amauri 77', 84', 90+1'; Sansone 80'		Santana 56'	Stadium: Stadio Ennio Tardini; Attendance: 12,514; Referee: Carmine Russo

12 January 2014 19	Torino	0–0	Fiorentina	Turin
12:30 CET (UTC+01:00)			Roncaglia (yellow card) 58'	Stadium: Stadio Olimpico di Torino; Attendance: 21,258; Referee: Paolo Valeri

19 January 2014 20	Sassuolo	0–2	Torino	Reggio Emilia
15:00 CET (UTC+01:00)			Immobile 25'; Brighi 48'	Stadium: Mapei Stadium – Città del Tricolore; Attendance: 10,219; Referee: Piero Giacomelli

26 January 2014 21	Torino	1–0	Atalanta	Turin
15:00 CET (UTC+01:00)	Cerci 60' (pen.)			Stadium: Stadio Olimpico di Torino; Attendance: 15,187; Referee: Paolo Tagliavento

2 February 2014 22	Milan	1–1	Torino	Milan
20:45 CET (UTC+01:00)	Rami 49'; Pazzini (yellow card) 78'; Bonera (yellow card) 81'		Immobile 17'; Vives (yellow card) 74'; Maksimović (yellow card) 76'	Stadium: San Siro; Attendance: 35,200; Referee: Antonio Damato

9 February 2014 23	Torino	1–2	Bologna	Turin
12:30 CET (UTC+01:00)	Immobile 5'		Cristaldo 11', 24'	Stadium: Stadio Olimpico di Torino; Attendance: 16,411; Referee: Massimiliano Irrati

17 February 2014 24	Verona	1–3	Torino	Verona
20:45 CET (UTC+01:00)	Toni 36' (pen.); Hallfreðsson (yellow card) 44'		El Kaddouri (yellow card) 29', (goal) 61'; Vives (yellow card) 31'; Bovo (yellow card) 45+1'; Immobile 49'; Cerci 53'	Stadium: Stadio Marc'Antonio Bentegodi; Attendance: 20,964; Referee: Gianluca Rocchi

23 February 2014 25	Juventus	1–0	Torino	Turin
18:30 CET (UTC+01:00)	Vidal (yellow card) 13'; Tevez 30'; Bonucci (yellow card) 63'		Pasquale (yellow card) 25'; El Kaddouri (yellow card) 80'	Stadium: Juventus Stadium; Attendance: 38,717; Referee: Nicola Rizzoli

2 March 2014 26	Torino	0–2	Sampdoria	Turin
15:00 CET (UTC+01:00)			Okaka 7'; Gabbiadini 79'	Stadium: Stadio Olimpico di Torino; Attendance: 13,975; Referee: Antonio Damato

9 March 2014 27	Internazionale	1–0	Torino	Milan
15:00 CET (UTC+01:00)	Palacio 30'		Vives (yellow card) 53'; Tachtsidis (yellow card) 77'; Darmian (yellow card) 86'; Moretti (yellow card) 90+4'	Stadium: San Siro; Attendance: 43,543; Referee: Gianpaolo Calvarese

17 March 2014 28	Torino	0–1	Napoli	Turin
19:00 CET (UTC+01:00)	Bovo (yellow card) 7'; Glik (yellow card) 65'		Jorginho (yellow card) 39'; Inler (yellow card) 55'; Higuaín 90'	Stadium: Stadio Olimpico di Torino; Attendance: 21,780; Referee: Daniele Doveri

22 March 2014 29	Torino	3–1	Livorno	Turin
18:00 CET (UTC+01:00)	Immobile 25', 60', 67'		Siligardi 89'	Stadium: Stadio Olimpico di Torino; Attendance: 12,572; Referee: Carmine Russo

25 March 2014 30	Roma	2–1	Torino	Rome
20:45 CET (UTC+01:00)	Nainggolan (yellow card) 30'; Destro 41'; Bastos (yellow card) 87'; Florenzi 90+1'		Moretti (yellow card) 29'; Immobile 52', (yellow card) 78'; Maksimović (yellow card) 65'; Vives (yellow card) 73'	Stadium: Stadio Olimpico; Attendance: 31,979; Referee: Mauro Bergonzi

30 March 2014 31	Torino	2–1	Cagliari	Turin
15:00 CEST (UTC+02:00)	El Kaddouri 45+1'; Cerci 71'		Nenê 77'	Stadium: Stadio Olimpico di Torino; Attendance: 13,271; Referee: Dino Tommasi

6 April 2014 32	Catania	1–2	Torino	Catania
15:00 CEST (UTC+02:00)	Bergessio 2'		Farnerud 79'; Immobile 83'	Stadium: Stadio Angelo Massimino; Attendance: 15,467; Referee: Gianluca Rocchi

13 April 2014 33	Torino	2–1	Genoa	Turin
15:00 CEST (UTC+02:00)	Immobile 90+2'; Cerci 90+3'		Gilardino 85'	Stadium: Stadio Olimpico di Torino; Attendance: 16,108; Referee: Maurizio Mariani

19 April 2014 34	Lazio	3–3	Torino	Rome
15:00 CEST (UTC+02:00)	Mauri 42'; Candreva 61' (pen.), 90+4'		Kurtić 52'; Tachtsidis 67'; Immobile 89'	Stadium: Stadio Olimpico; Attendance: 29,142; Referee: Marco Guida

27 April 2014 35	Torino	2–0	Udinese	Turin
15:00 CEST (UTC+02:00)	El Kaddouri 15'; Immobile 56'		Badu (yellow card) 29'; Heurtaux (yellow card) 53'; Pinzi (yellow card) 68'	Stadium: Stadio Olimpico di Torino; Attendance: 15,292; Referee: Paolo Valeri

4 May 2014 36	Chievo	0–1	Torino	Verona
15:00 CEST (UTC+02:00)	Paloschi 24', 40'; Rigoni (yellow card) 56'		Hamšík 13', 64'; Callejón 27'; Britos (yellow card) 62'; Higuaín 70'	Stadium: Stadio Marc'Antonio Bentegodi; Attendance: 10,031; Referee: Paolo Valeri

11 May 2014 37	Torino	1–1	Parma	Turin
15:00 CET (UTC+01:00)	Immobile 42'		Biabiany 71'	Stadium: Stadio Olimpico di Torino; Attendance: 25,569; Referee: Paolo Mazzoleni

18 May 2014 38	Fiorentina	2–2	Torino	Florence
20:45 CEST (UTC+02:00)	Pizarro (yellow card) 27'; Rossi 57' (pen.); Rebić 79'; Rodríguez (yellow card) 83'; Cuadrado (yellow card) 85'; Vargas (yellow card) 86'; Roncaglia (yellow card) 90+3'		Vives (yellow card) 56'; Larrondo 67'; Darmian (yellow card) 76'; Kurtić 84'	Stadium: Stadio Artemio Franchi; Attendance: 40,912; Referee: Nicola Rizzoli

=== Coppa Italia ===
17 August 2013 Third round	Torino	1–2	Pescara	Turin
20:30 CEST (UTC+02:00)	Immobile 53'		Maniero 47'; Ragusa 59'	Stadium: Stadio Olimpico di Torino; Attendance: 12,053; Referee: Davide Massa

== Statistics ==
=== Appearances and goals ===
No.	Pos	Nat	Player	Total		Serie A		Coppa Italia	
No.	Pos	Nat	Player	Apps	Goals	Apps	Goals	Apps	Goals
Goalkeepers
1	GK	(Belgium) BEL	Jean-François Gillet	0	0	0	0	0	0
23	GK	(Italy) ITA	Lys Gomis	1	0	0+1	0	0	0
32	GK	(Italy) ITA	Tommaso Berni	0	0	0	0	0	0
35	GK	(Italy) ITA	Daniele Padelli	39	0	38	0	1	0
Defenders
2	DF	(Uruguay) URU	Guillermo Rodríguez	7	0	5+1	0	1	0
3	DF	(Italy) ITA	Danilo D'Ambrosio	15	2	14	2	1	0
5	DF	(Italy) ITA	Cesare Bovo	20	0	20	0	0	0
17	DF	(Italy) ITA	Salvatore Masiello	8	0	6+2	0	0	0
19	DF	(Serbia) SRB	Nikola Maksimović	23	0	20+3	0	0	0
24	DF	(Italy) ITA	Emiliano Moretti	37	1	36	1	1	0
25	DF	(Poland) POL	Kamil Glik	35	2	33+1	2	1	0
26	DF	(Italy) ITA	Giovanni Pasquale	12	0	9+3	0	0	0
29	DF	(Montenegro) MNE	Marko Vešović	3	0	2+1	0	0	0
36	DF	(Italy) ITA	Matteo Darmian	38	0	37	0	1	0
Midfielders
4	MF	(Albania) ALB	Migjen Basha	25	0	13+11	0	0+1	0
7	MF	(Morocco) MAR	Omar El Kaddouri	30	5	25+4	5	0+1	0
8	MF	(Sweden) SWE	Alexander Farnerud	24	4	15+8	4	1	0
11	MF	(Italy) ITA	Alessio Cerci	38	13	35+2	13	0+1	0
14	MF	(Italy) ITA	Alessandro Gazzi	11	0	5+6	0	0	0
20	MF	(Italy) ITA	Giuseppe Vives	33	1	33	1	0	0
27	MF	(Montenegro) MNE	Jasmin Kurtić	16	2	14+2	2	0	0
33	MF	(Italy) ITA	Matteo Brighi	17	2	10+6	2	1	0
63	MF	(Italy) ITA	Nicola Bellomo	11	1	7+3	1	1	0
77	MF	(Greece) GRE	Panagiotis Tachtsidis	11	1	3+8	1	0	0
Forwards
9	FW	(Italy) ITA	Ciro Immobile	34	23	29+4	22	1	1
10	FW	(Brazil) BRA	Barreto	11	0	5+6	0	0	0
16	FW	(Argentina) ARG	Marcelo Larrondo	6	1	1+4	1	1	0
69	FW	(Italy) ITA	Riccardo Meggiorini	34	0	7+27	0	0	0
Players transferred out during the season
3	DF	(Italy) ITA	Danilo D'Ambrosio	15	2	14	2	1	0
33	MF	(Italy) ITA	Matteo Brighi	17	2	10+6	2	1	0

Last updated: 13 June 2014
Source: Competitions
