= Bruno Peres =

Brazilian footballer (born 1990)

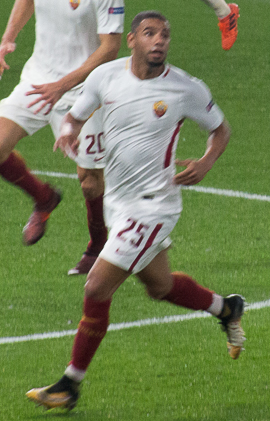
- Bruno Peres playing for Roma in 2017

Personal information
- Full name: Bruno da Silva Peres
- Date of birth: 1 March 1990 (age 36)
- Place of birth: São Paulo, Brazil
- Height: 1.78 m (5 ft 10 in)
- Position: Right-back

Youth career
- 2008–2010: Audax São Paulo

Senior career*
Years	Team	Apps	(Gls)
2010–2012	Audax São Paulo	26	(2)
2010	→ Bragantino (loan)	6	(1)
2011–2012	→ Guarani (loan)	33	(0)
2012–2014	Santos	38	(3)
2014–2016	Torino	65	(6)
2016–2021	Roma	94	(5)
2018–2019	→ São Paulo (loan)	16	(1)
2019	→ Sport Recife (loan)	14	(0)
2021–2023	Trabzonspor	34	(1)
2023	Athletico Paranaense	5	(0)
- * Club domestic league appearances and goals as of 07:49, 6 April 2024 (UTC)

Bruno da Silva Peres (Brazilian Portuguese: [ˈbɾunu ˈpɛɾis]) (born 1 March 1990), is a Brazilian professional footballer who plays as a right-back and is currently a free agent.

== Club career ==
=== Audax and loans ===
Born in São Paulo, Bruno Peres began his football career with Audax São Paulo Esporte Clube, and was eventually loaned to Clube Atlético Bragantino. He made 6 appearances for the club, scoring once.

In the following year, Peres returned to Audax, but was loaned again, this time to Guarani Futebol Clube. He played on 16 Série B games, and on 17 Campeonato Paulista games.

=== Santos ===
On 5 July 2012, Peres signed a one-and-a-half-year loan contract with Santos FC. He made his Santos debut three days later, on the match against Grêmio. Peres scored his first goal for the club on 29 July, against Ponte Preta. Bruno finished the season with 27 appearances for the club (25 for the league), scoring twice.

On 15 January 2013, it was announced that he would join SC Internacional in a four-year deal. However, Colorado had to pay a compensation to Santos, and three days later, the deal collapsed. Santos signed the player permanently on the same day.

After the arrival of Cicinho, Peres was later used as a backup to the former, and appeared in only 11 league matches during the campaign.

=== Torino ===
On 16 June 2014, Bruno Peres moved to Serie A side Torino, for a €2 million fee. After lengthy problems concerning his registration as a non-EU player, Peres made his debut for the club on 21 September, replacing Cristian Molinaro in the 69th minute of a 0–1 home loss to Hellas Verona, suffering a penalty in the 87th minute, missed by Omar El Kaddouri.

Bruno Peres made his first start on 24 September 2014, in a 2–1 away victory against Cagliari, and assisted Fabio Quagliarella in a 1–1 home draw against Fiorentina four days later. He scored his first goal for the club on 30 November, netting the momentary 1–1 against Juventus, after running for 78 meters with the ball, starting from the defence. On 1 February 2015, he scored the last goal in a 5–1 home win against Sampdoria, on an assist from teammate Marco Benassi. On 29 April 2015, he opened the score in an away game against Palermo (the match would end 2–2). He concluded the season with three goals in 34 appearances, contributing decisively to the season of Torino, who closed in ninth place.

On 26 November 2015, he renewed his contract with the club until 2020, doubling his wage to €800,000.

=== Roma ===
On 16 August 2016, Peres joined Roma on loan from Torino, for a fee of €1 million, with a conditional obligation to purchase – depending on the completion of certain performance targets – for a fee of €12.5 million. Moreover, Torino would receive an additional €1.5 million for certain sporting objectives reached by the club and player, making the total fee a maximum of €15 million. The permanent transfer of Peres to Roma was confirmed on 26 June 2017.

==== Loan to São Paulo ====
On 6 July 2018, Bruno Peres signed with São Paulo on loan from Roma until 31 December 2019.

==== Loan to Sport Recife ====
On 26 September 2019, Bruno Peres joined Série B club Sport Recife on loan until 31 December 2019.

===== Transfer to Trabzonspor =====
In May 2021, Bruno Peres joined Turkish side Trabzonspor on a free transfer, signing a three-year deal valid till 31 May 2024. On 27 April 2023 the club said it had mutually terminated the contract with the player.

== Style of play ==
Peres is a right-sided player known for his acceleration, pace, dribbling ability, and long-range shooting. Primarily an attacking full-back, he has also been deployed as a wing-back and wide midfielder. During the 2015–16 season, he completed the most dribbles (83) and recorded the most shots on target (15) among defenders in Europe's top five leagues. He has also been noted for his high pace and long-shot ratings in the FIFA video game series.

== Career statistics ==
=== Club ===
As of match played 7 December 2023

Club	Season	League			National Cup (Note: Includes Copa do Brasil and Coppa Italia)		Continental (Note: Includes Copa Libertadores, UEFA Champions League, UEFA Europa League and UEFA Europa Conference League)		Other (Note: Includes Campeonato Paulista and Recopa Sudamericana)		Total	
Club	Season	Division	Apps	Goals	Apps	Goals	Apps	Goals	Apps	Goals	Apps	Goals
Audax São Paulo	2010	—			—		—		10	0	10	0
Audax São Paulo	2011	—			—		—		16	2	16	2
Audax São Paulo	Total	—			—		—		26	2	26	2
Bragantino (loan)	2010	Série B	6	1	—		—		—		6	1
Guarani (loan)	2011	Série B	13	0	—		—		—		13	0
Guarani (loan)	2012	Série B	3	0	—		—		17	0	20	0
Guarani (loan)	Total		16	0	—		—		17	0	33	0
Santos	2012	Série A	25	2	—		—		2	0	27	2
Santos	2013	Série A	11	1	2	0	—		18	0	31	1
Santos	2014	Série A	2	0	1	0	—		7	1	10	1
Santos	Total		38	3	3	0	—		27	1	68	4
Torino	2014–15	Serie A	34	3	0	0	—		—		34	3
Torino	2015–16	Serie A	31	3	2	0	—		—		33	3
Torino	2016–17	Serie A	0	0	1	1	—		—		1	1
Torino	Total		65	6	3	1	—		—		68	7
Roma	2016–17	Serie A	30	2	4	0	10	0	—		44	2
Roma	2017–18	Serie A	18	0	1	0	6	0	—		25	0
Roma	2019–20	Serie A	16	2	2	0	1	0	—		19	2
Roma	2020–21	Serie A	30	1	1	0	13	1	—		44	2
Roma	Total		94	5	8	0	30	1	—		132	6
São Paulo (loan)	2018	Série A	16	1	—		2	0	—		18	1
São Paulo (loan)	2019	Série A	0	0	—		2	0	6	0	8	0
São Paulo (loan)	Total		16	1	—		4	0	6	0	26	1
Sport (loan)	2019	Série B	14	0	—		—		—		14	0
Trabzonspor	2021–22	Süper Lig	27	1	4	0	4	0	—		35	1
Trabzonspor	2022–23	Süper Lig	7	0	2	0	2	0	—		11	0
Trabzonspor	Total		34	1	6	0	6	0	—		46	1
Athletico Paranaense	2023	Série A	5	0	—		—		—		5	0
Career total			288	17	20	1	40	1	76	3	424	22

== Honours ==
Santos

- Recopa Sudamericana: 2012

Trabzonspor

- Süper Lig: 2021–22
- Turkish Super Cup: 2022
