= Giovanni Graziano =

Italian footballer

Personal information
- Date of birth: 7 March 1995 (age 31)
- Place of birth: Vercelli, Italy
- Height: 1.87 m (6 ft 2 in)
- Position: Midfielder

Team information
- Current team: Biellese
- Number: 95

Youth career
- 2005–2015: Torino

Senior career*
Years	Team	Apps	(Gls)
2014–2018	Torino	0	(0)
2015–2017	→ Renate (loan)	44	(2)
2017–2018	→ Teramo (loan)	28	(2)
2018–2019	Gozzano	31	(0)
2019–2021	Pro Vercelli	31	(1)
2021–2023	Fermana	76	(1)
2023	Desenzano	14	(1)
2023–2024	Luparense	19	(1)
2024–	Biellese	30	(3)
- * Club domestic league appearances and goals as of 25 June 2026

Giovanni Graziano (born 7 November 1995) is an Italian professional footballer who plays as a midfielder for Serie D club Biellese. He is the cousin of footballer Giuseppe Garziano.

== Club career ==
Giovanni is a youth exponent of Torino's footballing school, first recruited from the Pulcini of Pro Vercelli in 2005. In 2012–13 he made his debut for the Primavera where, the following year, he was a key player in the side that reached the finals of the Campionato Nazionale Primavera, lost on penalties to Chievo. At the end of the season, he signed his first professional contract with Torino until 2018.

He made his senior debut on 11 December 2014 against Copenhagen in a UEFA Europa League game, replacing Omar El Kaddouri after 66 minutes in a 5–1 away win.

On 15 August 2019, he signed with his childhood club Pro Vercelli.

On 14 January 2021, he joined Fermana on a 2.5-year contract.

== Career statistics ==
=== Club ===
As of match played 22 December 2021

Appearances and goals by club, season and competition
Club	Season	League			National Cup		League Cup		Continental		Total	
Club	Season	Division	Apps	Goals	Apps	Goals	Apps	Goals	Apps	Goals	Apps	Goals
Torino	2014–15	Serie A	0	0	0	0	—		1 (Note: Appearance(s) in UEFA Europa League)	0	1	0
Renate (loan)	2015–16	Lega Pro	25	1	—		1	0	—		26	1
Renate (loan)	2016–17	Lega Pro	19	1	—		1	0	—		20	1
Renate (loan)	Total		44	2	0	0	2	0	0	0	46	2
Teramo (loan)	2017–18	Serie C	28	2	—		1	0	—		29	2
Gozzano	2018–19	Serie C	30	0	—		4	0	—		34	0
Pro Vercelli	2019–20	Serie C	17	1	—		—		—		17	1
Pro Vercelli	2020–21	Serie C	17	0	—		—		—		17	0
Pro Vercelli	Total		34	1	0	0	0	0	0	0	34	1
Fermana	2020–21	Serie C	14	0	—		—		—		14	0
Fermana	2021–22	Serie C	18	0	—		1	0	—		19	0
Fermana	Total		32	0	0	0	1	0	0	0	33	0
Career total			168	5	0	0	8	0	1	0	177	5

== Honours ==
=== Club ===
Torino

- Campionato Primavera: 2014–15
