= Simone Rosso =

Italian footballer (born 1995)

Personal information
- Date of birth: 10 November 1995 (age 31)
- Place of birth: Pinerolo, Italy
- Height: 1.81 m (5 ft 11 in)
- Position: Winger

Team information
- Current team: Gozzano
- Number: 10

Youth career
- 2013–2015: Torino

Senior career*
Years	Team	Apps	(Gls)
2015–2017	Torino	2	(0)
2015–2017	→ Brescia (loan)	25	(0)
2017	→ Alessandria (loan)	6	(1)
2017–2020	Pro Vercelli	30	(7)
2017–2018	→ Reggiana (loan)	21	(1)
2020–2021	Mantova	14	(1)
2021	→ Casertana (loan)	15	(1)
2021–2022	Teramo	32	(2)
2022–2023	Rimini	14	(1)
2023–2024	Desenzano	11	(0)
2024	Forlì	9	(1)
2024–	Gozzano	5	(0)

International career
2015	Italy U20	2	(0)
- * Club domestic league appearances and goals as of 10 November 2024

Simone Rosso (born 10 November 1995) is an Italian professional footballer who plays as a winger for Serie D club Gozzano.

== Career ==
Rosso is a youth exponent from Torino. He made his Serie A debut on 24 May 2015 at San Siro against Milan, replacing Josef Martínez after 71 minutes in a 3–0 away defeat.

On 6 August 2015, he was loaned to Brescia in Serie B. He made his debut for Brescia on 5 September, in a 2–0 defeat away to Cesena; in July 2016 the loan was renewed and he returned to Brescia.

In January 2017, he returned from loan, and was loaned again, to Alessandria in Lega Pro. In July, he was sold outright to Pro Vercelli in Serie B.

On 29 January 2021, he joined Casertana on loan with an option to purchase.

On 9 September 2021, he signed for Teramo.

On 19 August 2022, Rosso moved to Rimini.

== Career statistics ==
=== Club ===
As of match played 2 October 2021

Appearances and goals by club, season and competition
Club	Season	League			Cup		Other		Total	
Club	Season	Division	Apps	Goals	Apps	Goals	Apps	Goals	Apps	Goals
Torino	2014–15	Serie A	2	0	0	0	–		2	0
Brescia	2015–16	Serie B	15	0	0	0	–		15	0
Brescia	2016–17	Serie B	10	0	1	0	–		11	0
Brescia	Total Career		25	0	1	0	0	0	26	0
Alessandria (loan)	2016–17	Lega Pro	6	1	0	0	–		6	1
Pro Vercelli	2018–19	Serie C	7	0	1	0	4 (Note: Two appearances in Promotion Playoffs, two appearances in Coppa Italia Serie C)	0	12	0
Pro Vercelli	2019–20	Serie C	23	7	2	0	–		25	7
Pro Vercelli	Total Career		30	7	3	0	4	0	37	7
Reggiana (loan)	2017–18	Serie C	17	1	2	0	4 (Note: Appearance(s) in Promotion Playoffs)	0	23	1
Mantova	2020–21	Serie C	15	1	0	0	–		15	1
Mantova	2021–22	Serie C	0	0	0	0	1 (Note: Appearance(s) in Coppa Italia Serie C)	1	1	1
Mantova	Total Career		15	1	0	0	1	1	16	2
Casertana (loan)	2020–21	Serie C	14	1	0	0	1	0	15	1
Teramo	2021–22	Serie C	6	0	0	0	1	0	7	0
Total Career			115	11	6	0	11	1	132	12

== Honours ==
=== Club ===
Torino

- Campionato Primavera (1): 2014–15
