= Salvatore Masiello =

Italian footballer

Personal information
- Full name: Salvatore Masiello
- Date of birth: 31 January 1982 (age 44)
- Place of birth: Naples, Italy
- Height: 1.78 m (5 ft 10 in)
- Position: Left-back

Youth career
- 1996–1999: Venezia

Senior career*
Years	Team	Apps	(Gls)
1999–2001	Venezia	1	(0)
2001–2002	Lumezzane	49	(1)
2003–2005	Palermo	20	(0)
2004–2005	→ Piacenza (loan)	38	(6)
2006–2008	Udinese	1	(0)
2006–2007	→ Messina (loan)	36	(1)
2007–2008	→ Vicenza (loan)	39	(4)
2008–2012	Bari	50	(1)
2012–2015	Torino	33	(0)
2016	Mantova	6	(1)
Total		273	(14)
- * Club domestic league appearances and goals

Salvatore Masiello (born 31 January 1982) is an Italian former professional footballer who played as a left-back.

== Club career ==
=== From Venezia to Palermo ===
Masiello started his career at Venezia, he made one Serie B appearance before moving to Lumezzane (Lega Pro Prima Divisione). In January 2003, he was signed by U.S. Città di Palermo and rejoined chairman Maurizio Zamparini. In the 2004–05 season, he became a surplus of newly promoted Palermo, and he was loaned to Piacenza along with Simone Pepe. In the 2005–06 season, he returned to Palermo, and made his Serie A debut on 6 November 2005, against Sampdoria.

=== Udinese ===
In January 2006, he was involved in the transfer deal of David Di Michele, to join Udinese along with Pepe and Nicola Santoni in joint-ownership. Masiello's half-registration rights were valued at €250,000 at that time. In the 2005–06 season, he played three Serie A games, two for Palermo and one for Udinese.

In the 2006–07 season, he was loaned to Messina (Serie A) and in 2007–08 for Vicenza (Serie B). In June 2008, Udinese acquired the whole rights for free.

=== Bari ===
In the summer of 2008, Masiello joined AS Bari from Udinese by joint-ownership bid, for €200,000. In June 2011, Bari acquired Masiello outright and sold Paulo Vitor Barreto back to Udinese.

Press reports in August 2011 stated that he was involved in a plate-throwing incident at a Bari team dinner. Fellow Bari player Alessandro Crescenzi was reportedly struck by the plate and had to have 40 stitches in the resulting wound. The club announced its intention to refer Masiello's conduct to the Court of Sports Arbitration of Lega Serie B and to seek the termination of Masiello's contract.

=== Torino ===
On 31 January 2012, the last day of the transfer market, he moved to Torino, with whom he signed a contract until 2013. At the end of the season, he was promoted to Serie A, playing only the last league game AlbinoLeffe - Torino (0–0).

The following season competed in the top division with the Granata, he totaled 24 appearances. He remained a free transfer at the end of the season, but on 8 July 2013 signed a new contract with the Granata. He followed the same fate the following year: left without a contract, he signed with Torino for another season.

== International career ==
On 14 January 2004, when he played for Palermo, he was summoned from Italy under-21 Serie B representative team for an internship at the Borghesiana, not playing any games.
