= Marco Benassi =

Italian professional footballer

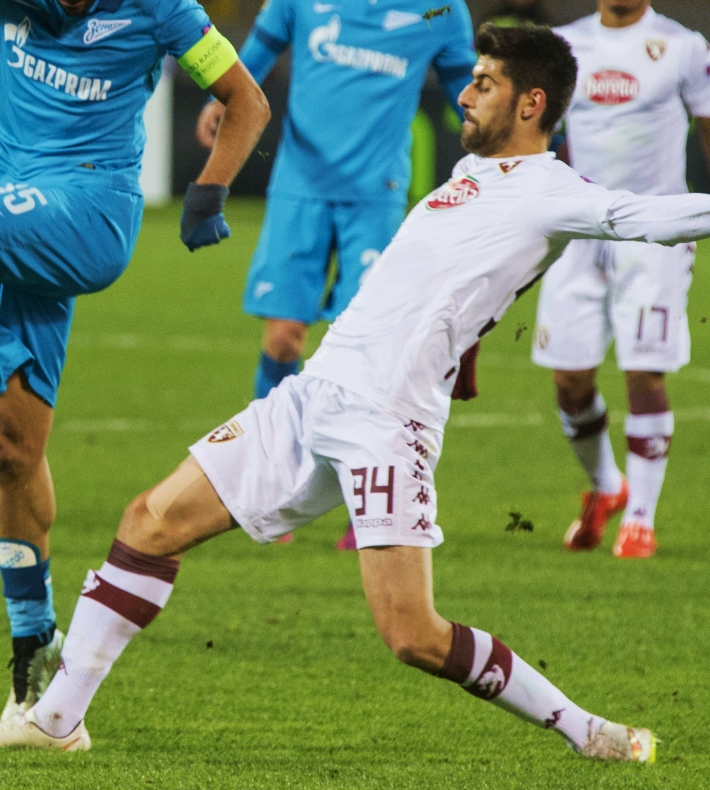
- Benassi with Torino in 2015

Personal information
- Date of birth: 8 September 1994 (age 32)
- Place of birth: Modena, Italy
- Height: 1.84 m (6 ft 0 in)
- Position: Midfielder

Youth career
- 2007–2011: Modena
- 2011–2012: Inter Milan

Senior career*
Years	Team	Apps	(Gls)
2012–2014	Inter Milan	6	(0)
2013–2014	→ Livorno (loan)	20	(2)
2014–2017	Torino	85	(11)
2017–2023	Fiorentina	93	(13)
2020–2021	→ Hellas Verona (loan)	0	(0)
2022	→ Empoli (loan)	12	(0)
2023	→ Cremonese (loan)	15	(0)

International career
2011–2012	Italy U18	8	(1)
2012–2013	Italy U19	13	(1)
2013–2017	Italy U21	27	(6)
2016–2018	Italy	0	(0)
- * Club domestic league appearances and goals as of 3 June 2023

Marco Benassi (born 8 September 1994) is an Italian professional footballer who plays as a midfielder.

== Club career ==
=== Early career ===
Born in Modena, Benassi began his career at his local club Modena. In January 2011 Benassi was signed by Inter Milan on a temporary deal. After a half-season with the Inter U17 youth team, Benassi signed for Inter permanently in a co-ownership deal for €180,000. Benassi was a member of both Inter U18 and U19 team in 2011–12 season, winning the Primavera league and European title – NextGen Series. He also played for the U18 team in the league playoffs round, winning the Berretti league.

Benassi was included in summer training camp by his former U19 team coach Andrea Stramaccioni, winning the pre-season TIM Trophy and well as being included in the 25-men List A squad for 2012–13 UEFA Europa League; as one of the four essential association trained player (local player) as required by UEFA. In October 2012 he signed a new five-year contract.

Benassi made his senior debut for Inter 22 November 2012 against Russian side Rubin Kazan in the starting XI. Fielding a younger squad, Inter lost 3–0. On 12 January 2013, he made his Serie A debut for Inter, starting in a 2–0 victory over Pescara. On 21 February 2013, he scored his first senior goal against CFR Cluj.

==== Loan to Livorno ====
On 9 July 2013, he was transferred on loan to Livorno, making his competitive debut on 17 August in a 1–0 Coppa Italia defeat against Siena. He scored his first goal in the Italian top flight on 26 January 2014 at home to Sassuolo, before scoring his second of the season on 16 March against Bologna.

=== Torino ===
On 1 July 2014, it was officially announced that Benassi was sold to Torino under a co-ownership agreement, as part of the transfer that brought Danilo D'Ambrosio to Inter in January. He made his debut for the Granata as a substitute during the third round of the 2014–15 Europa League which Torino won 3–0 against Swedish club Brommapojkarna. On 18 January 2015 he scored his first goal for Torino against Cesena. He scored again on 8 March after entering as a substitute for Alessandro Gazzi, marking the final goal in a 3–2 defeat at the Stadio Friuli against Udinese. He returned to the scoresheet in the final game of the season against Cesena (the match ended 5–0 in favour of Torino).

On 25 June 2015, the deadline for the expiration of the co-ownership, Torino acquired the other half of his contract for an additional €3.3 million, after winning a blind auction against the reported €2.9 million offered by the Nerazzurri. At the start of his second season with the club he changed his shirt number, from 94 to 15. During a 2–1 win over Palermo on 27 September 2015, Benassi scored with a volley reminiscent of Marco van Basten's strike in the final of Euro 88. On 7 February 2016 he opened the scoring in a home loss against Chievo Verona. He finished the season with 32 appearances in which he scored three goals.

He scored his first goal of the 2016–17 season in a 2–1 win against Fiorentina on 2 October 2016; a match in which he also wore the captain's armband for the first time for Torino.

=== Fiorentina ===
On 9 August 2017, Fiorentina announced the signing of Benassi on a five-year deal.

==== Hellas Verona (loan) ====
On 12 September 2020, Benassi joined Hellas Verona on a season-long loan, with option to buy. However, due to various injuries, he missed the entire season, making only one appearance on the team's substitutes bench on 20 February 2021 for the Serie A game against Genoa. At the season's end, he returned to Fiorentina.

==== Empoli (loan) ====
On 22 January 2022, Benassi moved to Empoli on loan.

==== Cremonese (loan) ====
On 19 January 2023, Benassi joined Cremonese on loan for the rest of the 2022–23 season.

==== Release by Fiorentina ====
On 2 September 2023, Benassi's contract with Fiorentina was terminated by mutual consent.

== International career ==
Benassi played all 3 games in the 2013 UEFA European Under-19 Football Championship qualification. He made his debut with the Italy under-21 squad on 14 August 2013, under Luigi Di Biagio, in the friendly match Slovakia-Italy (1–4). From 10 to 12 March 2014, he was called up by the head coach of the senior national team, Cesare Prandelli, as part of an evaluate of young players ahead of the 2014 World Cup.

He took part in the 2015 UEFA European Under-21 Championship in the Czech Republic where he scored a brace in the last game of the group stage against England. Benassi began the subsequent biennial cycle as captain of the under-21 squad.

In May 2016 he was called up to the senior national team by coach Antonio Conte in preparation for the UEFA Euro 2016. He was subsequently included in the list of 30 provisional players for the tournament. On 31 May, he was named one of three reserves for the senior side for Euro 2016. On 7 October, he was called up again, this time by Gian Piero Ventura, as a replacement for the injured Riccardo Montolivo for the 2018 FIFA World Cup qualifier against Macedonia.

In June 2017, he was included in the Italy under-21 squad for the 2017 UEFA European Under-21 Championship by manager Di Biagio. Italy were eliminated by Spain in the semi-finals on 27 June, following a 3–1 defeat.

== Style of play ==
A midfielder, Benassi is capable of playing both as a defensive midfielder or as a more offensive minded central midfielder; he has also been used as a winger. In addition, he is a tackler and has the ability to make late attacking runs from behind into the box.

== Career statistics ==
=== Club ===
As of match played 21 May 2022

Appearances and goals by club, season and competition
Club	Season	League			Cup		Europe		Other		Total	
Club	Season	Division	Apps	Goals	Apps	Goals	Apps	Goals	Apps	Goals	Apps	Goals
Inter Milan	2012–13	Serie A	6	0	3	0	4 (Note: All appearances in Europa League)	1	—		13	1
Livorno (loan)	2013–14	Serie A	20	2	1	0	—		—		21	2
Torino	2014–15	Serie A	25	3	0	0	11	0	—		36	3
Torino	2015–16	Serie A	32	3	1	1	—		—		33	4
Torino	2016–17	Serie A	28	5	1	0	—		—		29	5
Torino	Total		85	11	2	1	11	0	0	0	98	12
Fiorentina	2017–18	Serie A	35	5	2	0	—		—		37	5
Fiorentina	2018–19	Serie A	32	7	4	2	—		—		36	9
Fiorentina	2019–20	Serie A	18	1	4	2	—		—		22	3
Fiorentina	2021–22	Serie A	6	0	2	0	—		—		8	0
Fiorentina	Total		91	13	12	4	0	0	0	0	103	17
Hellas Verona (loan)	2020–21	Serie A	0	0	0	0	—		—		0	0
Empoli (loan)	2021–22	Serie A	12	0	0	0	—		—		12	0
Career total			214	26	18	5	15	1	0	0	247	32

== Honours ==
Inter Milan

- Campionato Nazionale Primavera: 2011–12
- NextGen series: 2011–12
