= Davide Cinaglia =

Italian professional footballer (born 1994)

Personal information
- Date of birth: 10 April 1994 (age 32)
- Place of birth: Rome, Italy
- Height: 1.85 m (6 ft 1 in)
- Position: Centre back

Youth career
- 2004–2005: Racing Club
- 2005–2008: Roma
- 2008–2009: Pomezia
- 2009–2010: Pro Roma
- 2010–2013: Torino

Senior career*
Years	Team	Apps	(Gls)
2012–2013	Torino	0	(0)
2013–2014	FeralpiSalò	19	(0)
2014–2018	Ascoli	66	(1)
2018	Cremonese	15	(0)
2018–2019	Novara	31	(1)
2019–2021	Gubbio	35	(0)
2021–2023	Juve Stabia	34	(1)
2023–2024	Monterosi	10	(0)

International career
2012–2013	Italy U19	6	(0)
- * Club domestic league appearances and goals as of 6 May 2024

Davide Cinaglia (born 10 April 1994) is an Italian footballer who plays as a centre back.

== Club career ==
=== Early career ===
Born in Rome, he was part Roma youth system for three years before moving to Pomezia in 2008, then Pro Roma the following year. In 2010, he was noticed by observers of Torino who aggregated him to their Allievi Nazionali youth team coached by Moreno Longo.

In August 2013 he was sold to Lega Pro side FeralpiSalò under a co-ownership agreement. In his first season as a professional, he collected 19 appearances and on 22 June 2014 his contract was redeemed by Torino.

=== Ascoli ===
On 1 September 2014 he was sold to Lega Pro side Ascoli, collecting 17 appearances in the Italian third division during the 2014–15 season. With the promotion of the Bianconeri, he made his debut in Serie B the following year in a 1–0 defeat of Virtus Entella.

=== Cremonese ===
On 9 January 2018 he was signed by Cremonese.

=== Gubbio ===
On 2 September 2019, he signed a two-year contract with Gubbio.

=== Juve Stabia ===
On 27 July 2021, he joined Juve Stabia.

== International career ==
He has represented Italy at under-19 levels.
