= Emanuele Gatto =

Italian footballer (born 1994)

Personal information
- Date of birth: 11 August 1994 (age 32)
- Place of birth: Turin, Italy
- Height: 1.77 m (5 ft 9 1/2 in)
- Position: Midfielder

Team information
- Current team: Asti
- Number: 8

Youth career
- 2013: Torino

Senior career*
Years	Team	Apps	(Gls)
2013–2014	Lumezzane	26	(1)
2014	Torino	0	(0)
2014	Siena	0	(0)
2014–2018	Chievo	0	(0)
2014–2015	→ FC Lumezzane (loan)	11	(0)
2015–2016	→ Cuneo (loan)	31	(0)
2016–2017	→ Santarcangelo (loan)	26	(3)
2018–2019	Alessandria	44	(1)
2019–2022	Südtirol	84	(0)
2022–2024	Ancona-Matelica	63	(0)
2024	Sangiuliano	3	(0)
2024–2025	Latina	13	(0)
2025–	Asti	1	(0)

International career
2011	Italy U17	5	(0)
2011–2012	Italy U18	10	(2)
2012–2013	Italy U19	10	(2)
- * Club domestic league appearances and goals as of 7 September 2025

Emanuele Gatto (born 11 August 1994) is an Italian professional footballer who plays as a midfielder for Serie D club Asti.

== Club career ==
=== Torino ===
Born in Turin, Piedmont, Gatto started his career at hometown club Torino. He was called up to the first team on two occasions between 2011 and 2013, without ever debuting. In 2012–13, he was the captain of the Primavera side.

=== Lumezzane ===
On 16 July 2013 Gatto was sold to Lega Pro Prima Divisione club Lumezzane in co-ownership deal. The club finished as the 14th (out of 16 teams) in Group A of 2013–14 season. However the club was not relegated, as the prime and second divisions were merged into one division – Lega Pro Divisione Unica.

=== Siena ===
On 20 June 2014 Torino bought back Gatto, but included him in the transfer of Marcelo Larrondo to Torino from Siena outright. However, on 15 July 2014 Siena announced that the club failed to register in 2014–15 Serie B, thus the club went into liquidation.

=== Chievo ===
On 8 August 2014 Gatto was signed by Serie A club Chievo. On 11 August 2014 he returned to Lumezzane. On 28 July 2015 he was signed by Cuneo in another loan. On 27 July 2016 he was signed by Santarcangelo in another loan.

In 2017–18 season, both Emanuele Gatto and Massimiliano Gatto were remained in Verona for the first team of Chievo.

=== Alessandria ===
On 5 January 2018 Chievo announced that Gatto was sold to Alessandria.

=== Südtirol ===
On 14 July 2019, he signed a 2-year contract with 1-year extension option with Südtirol.

=== U.S. Ancona ===
On 8 July 2022, Gatto signed a two-year deal with Ancona-Matelica.

== International career ==
Gatto made his U19 national debut on 23 August 2012, against Croatia.
