= Andrea Cristini =

Italian footballer (born 1994)

Personal information
- Date of birth: 29 July 1994 (age 32)
- Place of birth: Venaria Reale, Italy
- Height: 1.90 m (6 ft 3 in)
- Position: Defender

Team information
- Current team: Turris

Youth career
- Torino

Senior career*
Years	Team	Apps	(Gls)
2013–2014	Cuneo	24	(1)
2014–2016	Pavia	23	(1)
2016	→ Mantova (loan)	6	(0)
2016–2017	Mantova	32	(0)
2017–2019	Cuneo	42	(0)
2019–2020	Teramo	24	(0)
2020–2021	Sambenedettese	25	(1)
2021–2023	Pro Vercelli	64	(1)
2023–2025	Trapani	19	(0)
2024–2025	→ Guidonia (loan)	32	(0)
2025–2026	Guidonia	26	(0)
2026–	Turris	0	(0)
- * Club domestic league appearances and goals as of 30 April 2026

Andrea Cristini (born 29 July 1994) is an Italian professional footballer who plays as a defender for Serie D club Turris.

== Club career ==
A youth product of Torino, Cristini began his professional career with Cuneo. Cristini made his professional debut with Cuneo in a 3–1 Serie C win over Torres on 1 September 2013. He moved to Mantova in 2016, and returned to Cunio in 2019. In 2019, he transferred to Teramo. On 19 September 2020, he signed a three-year contract with Sambenedettese.

On 10 August 2021, he joined Pro Vercelli.

== Personal life ==
Cristini's parents were both volleyball players. His brother, Marco is also a professional footballer.
