= Omar El Kaddouri =

Moroccan footballer

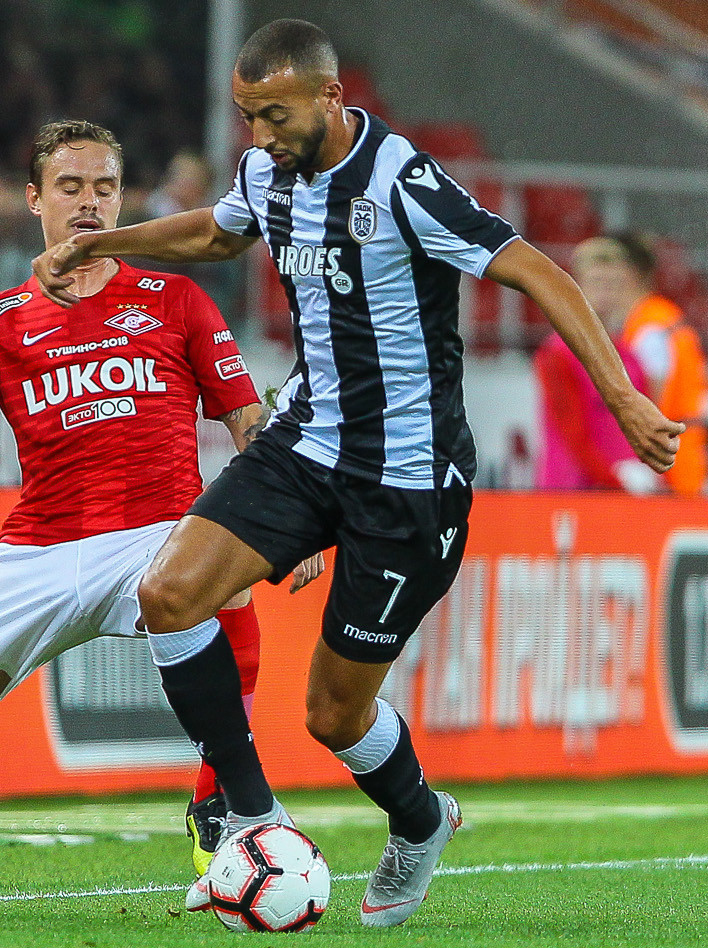
- El Kaddouri playing for PAOK in 2018

Personal information
- Date of birth: 21 August 1990 (age 36)
- Place of birth: Brussels, Belgium
- Height: 1.87 m (6 ft 2 in)
- Positions: Attacking midfielder; wide midfielder

Youth career
- 2001–2006: Diegem
- 2006–2008: Anderlecht
- 2008–2010: Brescia

Senior career*
Years	Team	Apps	(Gls)
2009–2012	Brescia	39	(7)
2010–2011	→ Südtirol (loan)	31	(2)
2012–2017	Napoli	32	(1)
2013–2015	→ Torino (loan)	61	(8)
2017	Empoli	15	(3)
2017–2023	PAOK	121	(5)
2024	CFR Cluj	15	(1)
2024–2025	SPAL	15	(0)

International career^{‡}
2011–2012	Belgium U21	2	(1)
2012	Morocco Olympic	2	(0)
2013–2020	Morocco	30	(5)
- * Club domestic league appearances and goals as of 27 April 2025 ‡ National team caps and goals as of 13 October 2020

Omar El Kaddouri (Arabic: عُمَر الْقَادُورِيّ; Riffian-Berber: ⵄⵓⵎⴰⵔ ⵍⵇⴰⴷⵓⵔⵉ; born 21 August 1990) is a former professional footballer who plays as a midfielder or a winger. Born in Belgium, he represented Morocco at international level.

== Club career ==
=== Early career ===
Born in Belgium to Riffian-Moroccan parents, El Kaddouri began his early career at K. Diegem Sport. He subsequently moved to Anderlecht after being scouted by their youth system. During the Torneo di Viareggio in 2007, he was scouted by Italian football club Brescia who signed him in 2008.

He played two seasons with the Brescia youth team, managing a first team appearance when he came on as a substitute against Livorno on 30 March 2009, aged just 18. Due to a lack of first team opportunities, he was sent out to Lega Pro side Südtirol, where he managed 32 appearances, scoring two goals and assisting a further 10.

=== Brescia ===
During 2011–12, El Kaddouri returned to Brescia, who decided to establish him in the centre midfield. On 3 October 2011, he scored the second goal in a defeat of Cittadella. On 5 March 2012 he scored his fifth goal of the season for le Rondinelle against Gubbio, on an assist of Jonathas. He concluded the season with 38 appearances and 7 goals.

=== Napoli ===
On 24 August 2012 El Kaddouri officially signed with Napoli under a co-ownership agreement for €2 million.

He officially debuted with the Neapolitans on 20 September as a starter in a Europa League match against Swedish side AIK Fotboll; his Serie A debut was on 2 December, in a home game against Pescara. He collected 7 appearances in Serie A, with 14 in total throughout the season.

On 20 June 2013 Napoli acquired the second half of his contract from Brescia.

==== Loan to Torino ====
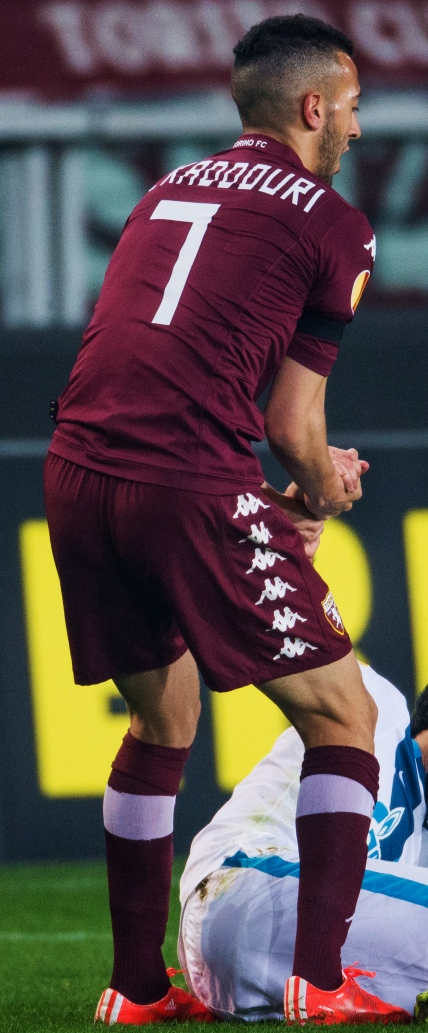
El Kaddouri with Torino

On 11 July 2013 El Kaddouri was loaned to Torino with the right to redeem half of his contract in co-ownership. He made his debut on 17 August in the third round of Coppa Italia, a 1–2 defeat against Pescara, substituting Alexander Farnerud at halftime. On 24 November he scored his first two goals for Torino during a 4–1 win against Catania. On 17 February 2014 he scored the final goal in a 3–1 win away at Verona, after providing two assists on the earlier goals.

In the league El Kaddouri collected 29 appearances and 5 goals. At the end of the season Torino opted to acquire 50% of his contract, however, Napoli exercised the right redeem his contract in full as stipulated. On 1 July 2014 he was reloaned to Torino with a buyout clause. On 7 February 2015 he scored his first goal of the season during an away fixture against Verona; the game ended 3–1 in favour of the Granata.

On 25 June 2015 El Kaddouri's contract was not redeemed by Torino and he returned to Naples.

On 31 January 2017, during the winter transfer window, El Kaddouri officially joined Empoli, moving from Napoli on a three-and-a-half-year contract, until 30 June 2021.

=== PAOK ===
On August 24, 2017, PAOK announced the signing of the Moroccan midfielder, who signed a four-year contract with the team. On 14 April 2018, he scored his first goal in the Super League, in a 3–1 home victory over Panionios. In his first year in the team of Thessaloniki, he reached the conquest of the Greek Cup. The final between PAOK and AEK was held at the OAKA stadium, with "Dikefalos tou Vorras" prevailing with a score of 2–0. The following season he clearly had a more active role in the team and took many opportunities from Răzvan Lucescu, the coach of PAOK. However, during the winter transfer window, there were strong rumors of a possible transfer to Parma, Italy, but after a suggestion from Lucescu and Ivan Savvidis, he eventually stayed at the club, and in the season finale celebrated the double, in addition to the championship, also won the cup.

In the 2019-2020 season, he was one of the main selections for the starting lineup, while 2020-2021 was his most productive year with the Thessaloniki team, participating in 39 games and offering 3 goals and 6 assists. In the final he celebrated the conquest of the Greek cup with PAOK. PAOK in the final prevailed with a score of 2–1 over OSFP. This was the fourth overall title of El Kantouri with the team of PAOK. He did not play in the final.

On June 16, 2021, PAOK and El Kaddouri agreed to extend their contract for another two years, with the prospect of an extension for another year. El Kaddouri entered the season with a muscle injury, after the first matches in Europe with Bohemian F.C. and Rijeka in which he was present. This left him out of the first two matches of the Conference League groups with Lincoln City F.C. and Slovan Bratislava as well as the first five matches of the Championship with PAS at home, Asteras away, Panetolikos away, AEK inside and OFI away. El Kaddouri returned at the beginning of April at the disposal of Răzvan Lucescu. He played 63 minutes in the playoff with Panathinaikos and in the second half of the match against Marseille, scoring PAOK's goal against the French team.

=== CFR Cluj ===
On January 5, 2024, CFR Cluj announced the signing of the midfielder, who signed a contract with the team.

=== SPAL ===
After 9 months of playing in Gruia, El Kaddouri has prematurely ended his contract with CFR Cluj by mutual agreement and he signed with Italian club SPAL for one season.

== International career ==
El Kaddouri was part of the Belgium U21 team. He scored his first goal for them on 14 November 2011 against England in a match part of the European Under-21 qualifiers in 2013. In July 2012, he participated in the Olympic Games in London with Morocco, making two appearances.

El Kaddouri then played for the Moroccan national team, making his debut 14 August 2013 in a friendly against Burkina Faso. He scored his first goal on 23 May 2014 in a 4–0 friendly win over Mozambique.

== Career statistics ==
=== Club ===
As of match played 27 April 2025

Appearances and goals by club, season and competition
Club	Season	League			National cup (Note: Includes Coppa Italia, Greek Football Cup)		Europe		Other		Total	
Club	Season	Division	Apps	Goals	Apps	Goals	Apps	Goals	Apps	Goals	Apps	Goals
Brescia	2008–09	Serie B	1	0	0	0	–		–		1	0
Brescia	2009–10	Serie B	0	0	2	0	–		–		2	0
Brescia	2011–12	Serie B	38	7	2	0	–		–		40	7
Brescia	Total		39	7	4	0	0	0	–		43	7
Südtirol (loan)	2010–11	Serie C1	31	2	0	0	–		1	0	32	2
Napoli	2012–13	Serie A	7	0	1	0	4 (Note: Appearances in UEFA Europa League)	0	–		12	0
Napoli	2015–16	Serie A	20	1	1	1	5	1	–		26	3
Napoli	2016–17	Serie A	5	0	0	0	0	0	–		5	0
Napoli	Total		32	1	2	1	9	1	–		43	3
Torino (loan)	2013–14	Serie A	29	5	1	0	–		–		30	5
Torino (loan)	2014–15	Serie A	32	3	1	0	13	1	–		46	4
Torino (loan)	Total		61	8	2	0	13	1	–		76	9
Empoli	2016–17	Serie A	15	3	1	0	–		–		16	3
PAOK	2017–18	Super League Greece	18	1	3	1	0	0	–		21	2
PAOK	2018–19	Super League Greece	17	1	6	0	9 (Note: Appearances in UEFA Champions League)	1	–		32	2
PAOK	2019–20	Super League Greece	23	1	2	0	4 (Note: Two appearances in UEFA Champions League, two appearances in UEFA Europa League)	0	–		29	1
PAOK	2020–21	Super League Greece	26	2	4	0	9 (Note: Four appearances and one goal in UEFA Champions League, five appearances in UEFA Europa League)	1	–		39	3
PAOK	2021–22	Super League Greece	14	0	2	0	11 (Note: Appearances in UEFA Europa Conference League)	2	–		27	2
PAOK	2022–23	Super League Greece	23	0	2	0	0	0	–		25	0
PAOK	Total		121	5	19	1	33	4	–		173	10
CFR Cluj	2023–24	Liga I	9	1	0	0	–		–		9	1
SPAL	2024–25	Serie C1	15	0	–		–		–		15	0
Career total			323	27	28	2	55	6	1	0	407	35

=== International ===
Appearances and goals by national team and year
National team	Year	Apps	Goals
Morocco	2013	3	0
Morocco	2014	8	3
Morocco	2015	7	2
Morocco	2016	5	0
Morocco	2017	4	0
Morocco	2018	0	0
Morocco	2019	1	0
Morocco	2020	2	0
Total		30	5

Scores and results list Morocco's goal tally first, score column indicates score after each El Kaddouri goal.

List of international goals scored by Omar El Kaddouri
No.	Date	Venue	Opponent	Score	Result	Competition	Ref.
1	23 May 2014	Estádio de São Luís, Faro, Portugal	Mozambique	1–0	4–0	Friendly	
2	9 October 2014	Marrakesh Stadium, Marrakesh, Morocco	Central African Republic	3–0	4–0	Friendly	
3	13 November 2014	Stade Adrar, Agadir, Morocco	Benin	3–0	6–1	Friendly	
4	12 June 2015	Stade Adrar, Agadir, Morocco	Libya	1–0	1–0	2017 Africa Cup of Nations qualification	
5	12 October 2015	Stade Adrar, Agadir, Morocco	Guinea	1–1	1–1	Friendly	

== Honours ==
PAOK

- Super League Greece: 2018–19
- Greek Cup: 2017–18, 2018–19, 2020–21
