= Marcelo Larrondo =

Argentine footballer (born 1988)

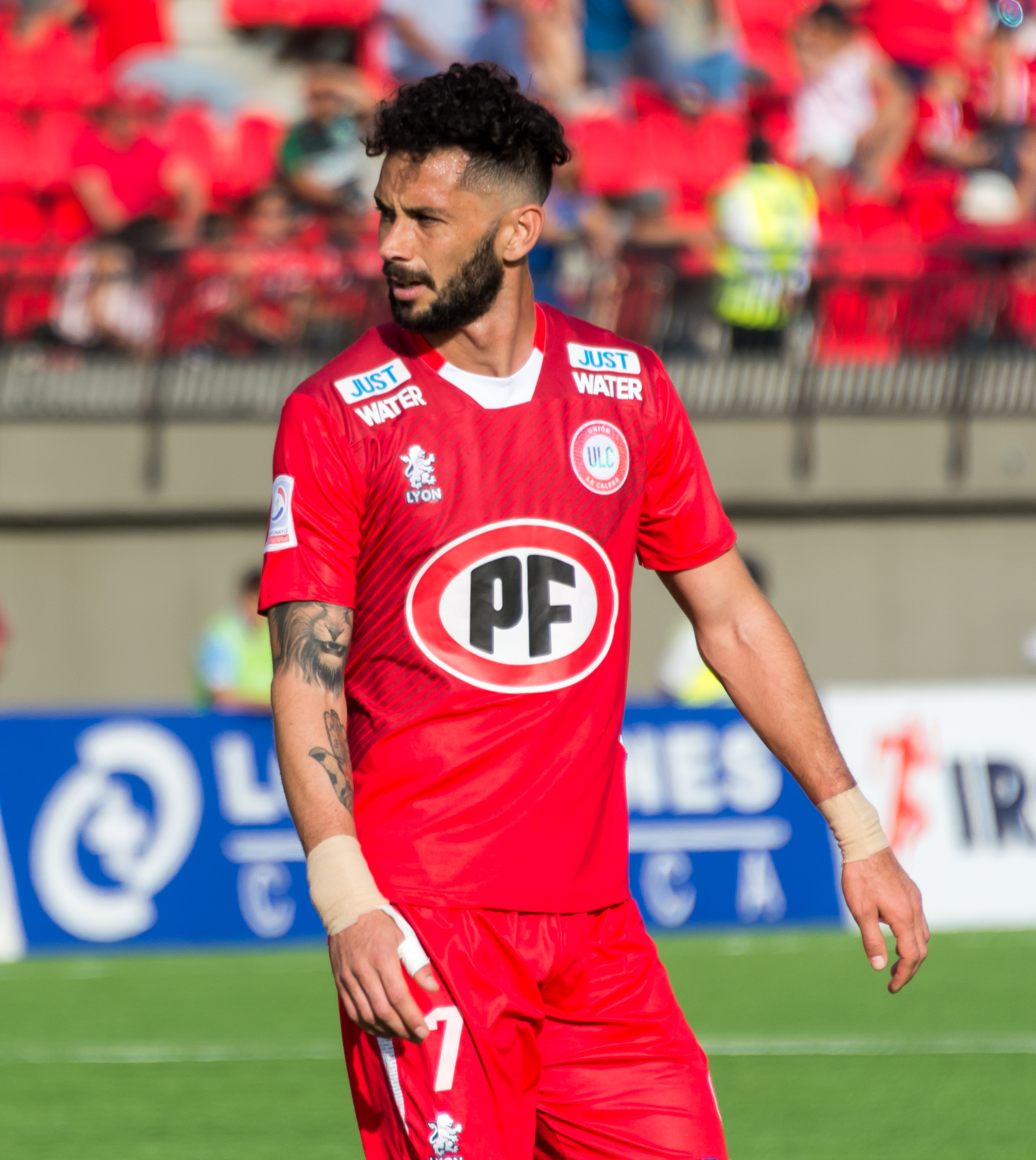
- Larrondo with Unión La Calera in 2019

Personal information
- Full name: Marcelo Alejandro Larrondo
- Date of birth: 16 August 1988 (age 38)
- Place of birth: Tunuyán, Argentina
- Height: 1.91 m (6 ft 3 in)
- Position: Striker

Team information
- Current team: Sportivo La Consulta

Youth career
- 2004–2005: Fernández Alvarez

Senior career*
Years	Team	Apps	(Gls)
2006–2007	Desamparados	18	(6)
2007–2008	River Plate	0	(0)
2009	Progreso	9	(1)
2009–2013	Siena	58	(8)
2013	→ Fiorentina (loan)	7	(2)
2013–2015	Torino	10	(1)
2015	→ Tigre (loan)	13	(3)
2015–2016	Rosario Central	16	(10)
2016–2019	River Plate	11	(1)
2018	→ Defensa y Justicia (loan)	8	(1)
2019	→ Unión La Calera (loan)	17	(4)
2020	Tigre	5	(1)
2020–2021	O'Higgins	39	(13)
2022	Audax Italiano	2	(0)
2023	Deportivo Maipú	10	(0)
2026–	Sportivo La Consulta	0	(0)
- * Club domestic league appearances and goals as of 14 August 2026

Marcelo Alejandro Larrondo (born 16 August 1988) is an Argentine footballer who plays as a forward for Sportivo La Consulta.

== Club career ==
=== Early career ===
Larrondo began his youth career with Fernández Álvarez in 2005. The next year, he moved to Sportivo Desamparados. In June 2007, he was purchased by River Plate. He participated in the 2008 Viareggio Tournament where he scored four goals in three games; however, he never broke into the first team.

=== Siena ===
In the summer of 2008, he was signed by Siena where he trained with the primavera (under-20 squad). That year, the Siena under-20 reached the finals of the Campionato Nazionale Primavera, where he scored two goals in the quarter-finals. He made his debut for the first team in a Serie A match between Siena and Lazio, ending 1–1.

On 12 November 2009, he scored the second goal in a 2–0 victory over U.S. Grosseto F.C. during Coppa Italia. He scored his first goal in Serie A on 21 March 2010 during Siena-Bologna, ending 1–0. At the end of the season Siena were relegated to Serie B. He scored his first goal in Serie B during a 2–1 home victory over Reggina. At the end of the season, Siena were promoted to Serie A, with Larrondo contributing 6 goals in 27 appearances.

==== Fiorentina (loan) ====
On 18 January 2013, Larrondo was signed by ACF Fiorentina on loan basis for €315,000, with the option to purchase. He made his debut with the Viola on 3 February 2013 against Parma as a substitute for Luca Toni. He scored his first goal on 3 March 2013; the winning goal for Fiorentina during a 2–1 defeat of Chievo Verona. He scored again during a 2–0 victory over Atalanta. At the end of the season, he returned to Siena.

=== Torino ===
On 30 July 2013, Larrondo was sold to Torino under a co-ownership agreement from Siena, for €700,000, with whom he signed a three-year contract with an option for a fourth. He debuted 17 August 2013 in the third round of Coppa Italia, lost 1–2 against Pescara. In only his third appearance, Larrondo broke his foot in a 2–2 draw with Milan – causing him to miss much of the season. He also required stitches after an alleged elbow from Nigel de Jong. He returned 9 February 2014, but was injured once again in March. He scored his first goal for Torino in the final game of the season against his former team, Fiorentina (2–2). On 20 June 2014, the co-ownership agreement with Siena was resolved in favour of Torino, with Emanuele Gatto moved to Siena. On 31 July he scored two goals in the preliminaries of the Europa League against Brommapojkarna.

==== Club Atlético Tigre (loan) ====
On 23 January 2015, he was loaned to the Argentine club Club Atlético Tigre with a buying option.

=== Rosario Central ===
On 24 July 2015, he was transferred outright to Rosario Central.

=== River Plate ===
On 22 July 2016, it was confirmed that he would join club River Plate.

=== Deportivo Maipú ===
After leaving Audax Italiano in March 2022, Larrondo joined Deportivo Maipú in June 2023. At the end of the same year, he ended his career and confirmed his retirement in 2025.

=== Return to play ===
In August 2026, Larrondo returned to the football activity with Sportivo La Consulta in the Torneo Regional Federal Amateur.

== International career ==
Larrondo was born in the city of Tunuyán in Mendoza, Argentina. His father Marino, is Chilean, originally from the city of Combarbalá, while his Argentine mother, Alicia, is from Mendoza, which makes him eligible to play for both national teams.

Jorge Sampaoli, then-manager of Chile, showed interest in him. Larrondo claimed it would be a dream to play for La Roja. Larrondo was named in Chile's provisional squad for Copa América Centenario but was cut from the final squad.

== Honours ==
Sportivo Desamparados

- Torneo Argentino A: Apertura 2006
