= Abou Diop =

Senegalese professional footballer

Personal information
- Date of birth: 6 October 1993 (age 33)
- Place of birth: Dakar, Senegal
- Height: 1.85 m (6 ft 1 in)
- Position: Forward

Team information
- Current team: Nocerina
- Number: 11

Youth career
- 2011–2013: Torino

Senior career*
Years	Team	Apps	(Gls)
2012–2018	Torino	3	(0)
2013–2014	→ Juve Stabia (loan)	13	(1)
2014	→ Crotone (loan)	9	(0)
2014–2015	→ Ternana (loan)	8	(0)
2015	→ Matera (loan)	19	(5)
2015–2016	→ Lecce (loan)	13	(2)
2016	→ Juve Stabia (loan)	15	(8)
2016–2017	→ Viterbese (loan)	19	(3)
2017	→ Modena (loan)	16	(6)
2017–2018	→ Bassano Virtus (loan)	33	(6)
2018–2019	Sampdoria	0	(0)
2018–2019	→ Vis Pesaro (loan)	26	(2)
2019–2022	Paganese	67	(19)
2022–2024	Picerno	34	(6)
2024	Giugliano	5	(0)
2024–2025	Cavese	16	(1)
2025–	Nocerina	15	(1)

International career
2012–2013	Senegal U20	7	(2)
2014	Senegal U21	2	(0)
- * Club domestic league appearances and goals as of 22 Juny 2026

Abou Diop (born 6 October 1993) is a Senegalese professional footballer who plays as a forward for Italian Serie D club Nocerina.

== Club career ==
=== Torino ===
He arrived at Torino on trial in early 2011 and was signed shortly after. The club had many bureaucratic difficulties in registering him, as Torino were prohibited from signing a non-European player before the age of 18. In the 2012–13 season he managed to collect several appearances for the first team.

==== Loans to Juve Stabia and Crotone ====
On 31 July 2013, he was loaned to Juve Stabia in Serie B where he made his debut on 24 August against Pescara. He scored his only goal of the season on 31 August in a 1–2 loss against Spezia. He was recalled by Torino in the Winter transfer window and loaned to Crotone on 24 January, but failed to break into the first team.

==== Loans to Ternana and Matera ====
Returning to Turin in the late summer, he was loaned to Ternana, in Serie B. After a very disappointing first round (only 132 minutes played), the Umbrian club decided to send him back to Turin during the winter transfer window, which loaned him to Matera, a team in Lega Pro.

==== Loans to Lecce and Juve Stabia ====
On 31 August 2015, the closing day for the transfer market, he moved to Lecce in Lega Pro.

=== Serie C ===
On 28 July 2019, he joined Paganese.

On 22 September 2022, Diop signed with Picerno.

On 30 August 2024, Diop moved to Cavese.
