= Cristian Molinaro =

Italian footballer (born 1983)

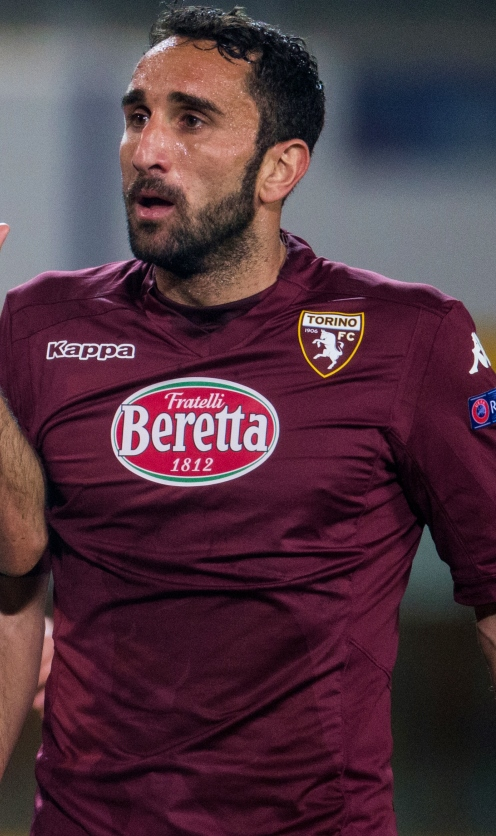
- Molinaro playing for Torino in 2015

Personal information
- Date of birth: 30 July 1983 (age 43)
- Place of birth: Vallo della Lucania, Italy
- Height: 1.82 m (6 ft 0 in)
- Position: Full-back

Team information
- Current team: Venezia (technical director)

Youth career
- 1989–1996: Gelbison
- 1996–2002: Salernitana

Senior career*
Years	Team	Apps	(Gls)
2002–2005	Salernitana	77	(1)
2005–2007	Siena	56	(0)
2007–2010	Juventus	65	(0)
2010	→ VfB Stuttgart (loan)	17	(0)
2010–2014	VfB Stuttgart	76	(0)
2014	Parma	16	(2)
2014–2018	Torino	81	(1)
2018–2019	Frosinone	14	(0)
2020–2022	Venezia	36	(0)
Total		438	(4)

International career
2004–2005	Italy U21 "B"	2	(0)
2010	Italy	2	(0)

Managerial career
- 2022–: Venezia (technical director)
- * Club domestic league appearances and goals

Cristian Molinaro (Italian pronunciation: [ˈkristjam mɔliˈnaːro]; born 30 July 1983) is an Italian professional football official and a former full-back. He works as a technical director for Serie A club Venezia. He represented the Italy national team.

== Club career ==
=== Early career ===
Molinaro started playing at age 5 for Gelbison, in Vallo della Lucania, before growing up in the various Salernitana youth teams.

In 2002–03 he made his league debut in Serie B. This marked the beginning of the two competitive seasons he played as a starter in Salerno, that included his first professional goal in 2004–05 in a match against Bari. In 2005, he moved to Siena, a club that he played for two seasons.

=== Siena and Juventus ===
In 2005, he was noticed by the dense network of observers of Juventus and signed, who decided to sell him in co-ownership to Siena, in which Juventus already had several players on loan. He made his debut in Serie A on 18 September 2005 in Siena - Palermo 1–2 and his first season in the top flight was characterised by ups and downs; losing the role of starting left-back to the more experienced Gianluca Falsini.

For 2006–07, Juventus, relegated to Serie B by the 2006 Italian football scandal, allowed Molinaro to remain at Siena (who sold Falsini), relying on him to cover the role of left-back. He collected 36 appearances out of 38 league games and two appearances in 2 rounds of Coppa Italia.

On 20 June 2007, shortly before the transfer window deadline, Juventus redeemed him for a sum of €2.5 million. During 2007–08, at age 24, he carved out a starting spot on the left wing of the defence of Juventus, thanks to the movement of companion Giorgio Chiellini to central defence.

In his second season at Juventus he debuted 13 August 2008 in the first leg of the third qualifying round of the Champions League, won 4–0 against Petržalka, which also represented his debut in European competition. On 28 November 2008 he extended his contract with Juventus until 2013. He finished the 2008–09 season prematurely because of a perirenal hematoma.

=== Stuttgart ===
With the arrival of Italy international Fabio Grosso and Uruguayan Martín Cáceres in the summer, Molinaro signed a loan deal with VfB Stuttgart on 5 January 2010 which initially saw him stay at the club until the end of the 2009–10 season. On 1 June 2010, VfB Stuttgart took advantage of a contract option and signed Molinaro permanently until June 2014. Juventus announced that on 14 June they received €3.9 million transfer fees and the deal was completed.

During the first round of the 2013–14 Bundesliga season, Molinaro only played once. Kicker and other media reported that VfB Stuttgart sought to offload him.

=== Parma ===
On 30 January, Parma announced that they had signed Cristian Molinaro. On 16 February 2014, he scored his first goal with the shirt of Parma, as well as first in Serie A, against Atalanta for the momentary 0–1. Shortly afterwards, in his first game against his former team, Juventus, he scored his second goal in Serie A.

=== Torino ===
On 16 June 2014, Molinaro was signed by Torino on an annual contract. He made his debut with the Granata in the third round of the 2014–15 Europa League against Brommapojkarna. On 25 June 2015, Torino exercised the option to extend his contract. He played a total of 38 games and scored one goal, in a 2–1 victory against Inter Milan.

On 18 September 2016, he ruptured his anterior cruciate ligament in a home game against Empoli. He returned on 13 March 2017, during a match against Lazio. After renewing his contract with Torino until June 2018, he continued to play for Torino until he fractured the head of his fibula in February. After the injury, he played his hundredth game for Torino on 29 April away against Lazio. At the end of the season he was released on a free transfer.

=== Frosinone ===
On 12 July 2018, Christian Molinaro joined Serie A club Frosinone on a free transfer.

=== Venezia ===
After not playing in the first half of the 2019–20 season, he signed with Serie B club Venezia on 15 January 2020 for the remainder of the season.

== International career ==
Molinaro received his first international call-up on 6 August 2010 under new head coach Cesare Prandelli. He made his debut on 10 August 2010, starting in the match against Ivory Coast. He was also called up for the games against Estonia and Faroe Islands in the Euro 2012 qualifiers.

== Post-playing career ==
On 13 June 2022, Venezia announced Molinaro's retirement from playing and his appointment to the position of the team's technical director.

== Career statistics ==
=== Club ===
As of 1 July 2022

Club	Season	League			Cup		Europe		Other		Total	
Club	Season	Division	Apps	Goals	Apps	Goals	Apps	Goals	Apps	Goals	Apps	Goals
Salernitana	2002–03	Serie B	5	0	0	0	—		—		5	0
Salernitana	2003–04	Serie B	33	0	1	0	—		—		34	0
Salernitana	2004–05	Serie B	39	1	5	0	—		—		44	1
Salernitana	Total		77	1	6	0	—		—		83	1
Siena	2005–06	Serie A	20	0	0	0	—		—		20	0
Siena	2006–07	Serie A	36	0	2	0	—		—		38	0
Siena	Total		56	0	2	0	—		—		58	0
Juventus	2007–08	Seria A	31	0	5	1	—		—		36	1
Juventus	2008–09	Seria A	29	0	2	0	9	0	—		40	0
Juventus	2009–10	Seria A	5	0	0	0	0	0	—		5	0
Juventus	Total		65	0	7	1	9	0	—		81	1
VfB Stuttgart (loan)	2009–10	Bundesliga	17	0	—		2	0	—		19	0
VfB Stuttgart	2010–11	Bundesliga	27	0	3	0	11	0	—		41	0
VfB Stuttgart	2011–12	Bundesliga	23	0	4	0	—		—		27	0
VfB Stuttgart	2012–13	Bundesliga	25	0	4	0	7	0	—		36	0
VfB Stuttgart	2013–14	Bundesliga	1	0	0	0	1	0	—		2	0
Total			93	0	11	0	21	0	—		125	0
Parma	2013–14	Serie A	16	2	—		—		—		16	2
Torino	2014–15	Serie A	24	0	1	0	13	1	—		38	1
Torino	2015–16	Serie A	27	1	2	0	—		—		29	1
Torino	2016–17	Serie A	10	0	0	0	—		—		10	0
Torino	2017–18	Serie A	20	0	4	0	—		—		24	0
Torino	Total		81	1	7	0	13	1	—		101	2
Frosinone	2018–19	Serie A	14	0	1	0	—		—		15	0
Venezia	2019–20	Serie B	12	0	—		—		—		12	0
Venezia	2020–21	Serie B	16	0	1	0	—		4 (Note: Appearances in Serie B – Promotion play-offs)	0	21	0
Venezia	2021–22	Serie A	8	0	1	0	—		—		9	0
Venezia	Total		36	0	2	0	—		4	0	42	0
Career total			438	4	36	1	43	1	4	0	521	6

=== International ===
As of match played 13 June 2015

Italy
Year	Apps	Goals
2010	2	0
Total	2	0

== Honours ==
VfB Stuttgart

- DFB-Pokal runner-up: 2012–13
