= Barreto (footballer, born 1985) =

Brazilian footballer (born 1985)

Personal information
- Full name: Paulo Vítor Barreto de Souza
- Date of birth: 12 July 1985 (age 41)
- Place of birth: Rio de Janeiro, Brazil
- Height: 1.71 m (5 ft 7 in)
- Position: Striker

Youth career
- 2000–2003: Treviso
- 2002: → Milan (loan)

Senior career*
Years	Team	Apps	(Gls)
2003–2005	Treviso	33	(12)
2005–2008	Udinese	53	(8)
2007–2008	→ Treviso (loan)	32	(14)
2008–2011	Bari	76	(41)
2011–2013	Udinese	11	(0)
2013–2015	Torino	28	(3)
2015	Venezia	5	(0)
2019–2020	Gozzano	4	(0)
Total		242	(78)
- * Club domestic league appearances and goals

Paulo Vitor de Souza Barreto (born 12 July 1985), known as Barreto, is a Brazilian former professional footballer who plays as a striker.

== Club career ==
=== Early career ===
Barreto grew up in the youth ranks of Treviso. In 2002, he was loaned to A.C. Milan where he was part of the Allievi Nazionale side that won that year's Torneo Città di Arco, defeating Fiorentina in the final.

=== Udinese ===
After scoring 12 goals in the 2004–05 season for Treviso, he was signed by Udinese, who gave him the opportunity to mark his debut not only in the Italian top flight but also in European competition, in which he scored two goals against RC Lens during the 2005–06 UEFA Cup.

==== Loan to Treviso ====
He returned to Treviso on loan in 2007, scoring 14 goals in 2007–08.

=== Bari ===
Barreto spent the 2008–09 season on loan at Bari, with whom he scored his first hat-trick in Serie B on 21 April 2009 during a match with Ancona. He contributed 23 goals during the season that saw Bari crowned Serie B champions, under Antonio Conte.

In 2009–10 season, his loan was extended and his goal scoring made Bari impress in the first half of the Serie A season. However, after the injury of centre-back Andrea Ranocchia and his striking partner Vitaly Kutuzov, the team performance also slipped.

On 25 June 2010, Bari signed him in a co-ownership bid, for €4.5 million.

In the next season, despite Kutuzov was recovered from injury, the team saw the departures of Italian international centre-backs Andrea Ranocchia and Leonardo Bonucci. With the failure to sign important replacements, not only for the centre-backs, the team conceded more goals and their tactics where affected. Barreto scored 4 goals before the winter break as team top-scorer, however much lesser than his performance last Christmas. The team finished as the bottom to enter the winter break.

Barreto also injured in November, the match against Parma. He injured again after came out from injury in December, against Palermo.

=== Return to Udinese and Torino ===
On 24 June 2011, his contract was redeemed by Udinese for €3 million, with whom he only played 12 games.

On 17 January 2013, Torino purchased him for €1.8 million from Udinese in another co-ownership deal, in a 2 1/2-year contract. Here, he found Giampiero Ventura, his coach at Bari. He debuted for the Granata on 20 January in an away fixture against Pescara won by Torino 2–0. He scored his first goal with Torino on 30 March against Napoli at the Stadio Olimpico, his first goal in 874 days. He scored again in the next week away to Bologna, scoring the momentary 0–1. He ended the season with 16 appearances and three goals and on 19 June the co-ownership between the Friuli and Turin was renewed. In June 2014 Torino redeemed his entire contract in a blind auction, for an additional €859,000.

=== Late career ===
In summer 2015 Barreto was signed by Serie D club Venezia on a free transfer. He terminated the contract in December 2015.

In summer 2019 he restarted his career by signing with Serie C club Gozzano.

== Honours ==
Bari

- Serie B: 2008-09

Venezia

- Serie D (Group C): 2015–16
