= 2011–12 Torino FC season =

Torino
2011–12 season
- President: Urbano Cairo
- Manager: Giampiero Ventura
- Stadium: Stadio Olimpico di Torino
- Serie B: 2nd (promoted)
- Coppa Italia: Third round
- Top goalscorer: League: Mirko Antenucci (10); All: Mirko Antenucci (11)
- Highest home attendance: 25,529 vs Modena
- Lowest home attendance: 9,689 vs Lumezzane
- Average home league attendance: 15,897
Home colours	Away colours	Third colours

The 2011–12 season was Torino FC's 101st season of competitive football and its 12th season in the second division of Italian football, Serie B.

== Players ==
=== Squad information ===
Note: Flags indicate national team as defined under FIFA eligibility rules; some limited exceptions apply. Players may hold more than one non-FIFA nationality.

No.	Pos.	Nation	Player
1	GK	ITA	Davide Morello
3	DF	ITA	Danilo D'Ambrosio
4	MF	ALB	Migjen Basha
5	DF	ITA	Valerio Di Cesare
6	DF	ITA	Angelo Ogbonna (vice-captain)
7	FW	ITA	Mirko Antenucci
8	MF	ITA	Biagio Pagano
9	FW	ITA	Rolando Bianchi (captain)
10	FW	ITA	Alessandro Sgrigna
11	MF	ITA	Manuel Iori
16	DF	ARG	Luciano Zavagno
18	DF	ITA	Marco Chiosa
19	MF	SRB	Alen Stevanović
20	MF	ITA	Giuseppe Vives
21	FW	NGA	Osarimen Ebagua
22	FW	ITA	Stefano Guberti

No.	Pos.	Nation	Player
23	MF	ROU	Sergiu Suciu
25	DF	POL	Kamil Glik
27	MF	ITA	Giuseppe De Feudis
28	DF	ITA	Alessandro Parisi
30	DF	ITA	Salvatore Masiello
32	MF	URU	Juan Surraco
34	GK	ITA	Ferdinando Coppola
36	DF	ITA	Matteo Darmian
50	DF	ITA	Francesco Pratali
69	FW	ITA	Riccardo Meggiorini
77	FW	ITA	Cristian Pasquato
89	GK	SEN	Lys Gomis
90	MF	NGA	Nnamdi Oduamadi
92	MF	ITA	Simone Verdi
99	GK	ITA	Francesco Benussi

== Competitions ==
=== Serie B ===
==== League table ====
Pos	Team	Pld	W	D	L	GF	GA	GD	Pts	Promotion or relegation
1	Pescara (C, P)	42	26	5	11	90	55	+35	83 (Note: PES 2–0 TOR; TOR 4–2 PES)	Promotion to Serie A
2	Torino (P)	42	24	11	7	57	28	+29	83	Promotion to Serie A
3	Sassuolo	42	22	14	6	57	33	+24	80	Qualification to promotion play-off
4	Hellas Verona	42	23	9	10	60	41	+19	78	Qualification to promotion play-off
5	Varese	42	20	11	11	57	41	+16	71	Qualification to promotion play-off

Source: https://int.soccerway.com/national/italy/serie-b/2011-2012/regular-season/
Rules for classification: 1) points; 2) head-to-head points; 3) head-to-head goal difference; 4) head-to-head goals scored; 5) goal difference; 6) number of goals scored.
(C) Champions; (P) Promoted

==== Results summary ====
Overall								Home						Away					
Pld	W	D	L	GF	GA	GD	Pts	W	D	L	GF	GA	GD	W	D	L	GF	GA	GD
42	24	11	7	57	28	+29	83	16	4	1	39	14	+25	8	7	6	18	14	+4

Last updated: 26 May 2012.
Source: Competitive matches

==== Results by round ====
Round	1	2	3	4	5	6	7	8	9	10	11	12	13	14	15	16	17	18	19	20	21	22	23	24	25	26	27	28	29	30	31	32	33	34	35	36	37	38	39	40	41	42
Ground	A	H	H	A	H	A	A	H	A	H	A	H	A	A	H	A	H	A	H	A	H	H	A	A	H	A	H	H	A	H	A	H	A	H	H	A	H	A	H	A	H	A
Result	W	D	W	W	D	W	W	W	W	W	L	W	W	D	D	D	W	L	W	L	D	W	D	D	W	L	W	W	W	L	D	W	L	W	W	D	W	W	W	L	W	D
Position	8	6	2	2	3	3	2	1	1	1	1	1	1	1	1	1	1	1	1	1	1	1	2	3	3	3	2	1	1	2	3	1	1	3	3	3	1	1	1	2	1	2

Updated to match(es) played on 20 May 2012. Source: Competitive matches
A = Away; H = Home; W = Win; D = Draw; L = Loss

==== Matches ====
27 August 2011 1	Ascoli	1–2	Torino	Ascoli Piceno
19:00 CEST (UTC+02:00)	Anđelković 4'		Bianchi 71' (pen.); Oduamadi 87'	Stadium: Stadio Cino e Lillo Del Duca; Attendance: 4,491; Referee: Maurizio Ciampi

31 August 2011 2	Torino	1–1	Cittadella	Turin
20:45 CEST (UTC+02:00)	Cordaz 81' (o.g.)		Di Roberto 84'	Stadium: Stadio Olimpico di Torino; Attendance: 16,387; Referee: Angelo Cervellera

4 September 2011 3	Torino	2–0	Varese	Turin
20:45 CEST (UTC+02:00)	Stevanović 40'; Sgrigna 49'			Stadium: Stadio Olimpico di Torino; Attendance: 13,716; Referee: Piero Giacomelli

12 September 2011 4	Vicenza	0–1	Torino	Vicenza
20:45 CEST (UTC+02:00)			Bianchi 90+4'	Stadium: Stadio Romeo Menti; Attendance: 7,018; Referee: Emiliano Gallione

19 September 2011 5	Torino	0–0	Brescia	Turin
20:45 CEST (UTC+02:00)				Stadium: Stadio Olimpico di Torino; Attendance: 18,247; Referee: Leonardo Baracani

24 September 2011 6	Nocerina	1–2	Torino	Nocera Inferiore
15:00 CEST (UTC+02:00)	Catania 69' (pen.)		Antenucci 20'; Ebagua 60'	Stadium: Stadio San Francesco d'Assisi; Attendance: 7,500; Referee: Angelo Martino Giancola

30 September 2011 7	Sampdoria	1–2	Torino	Genoa
21:00 CEST (UTC+02:00)	Costa 20'		Suciu 41'; Bianchi 76'	Stadium: Stadio Luigi Ferraris; Attendance: 25,188; Referee: Dino Tommasi

5 October 2011 8	Torino	1–0	Grosseto	Turin
20:45 CEST (UTC+02:00)	Iorio 79' (o.g.)			Stadium: Stadio Olimpico di Torino; Attendance: 15,523; Referee: Gianpaolo Calvarese

9 October 2011 9	Hellas Verona	1–3	Torino	Verona
15:00 CEST (UTC+02:00)	Abbate 44'		Bianchi 16'; Sgrigna 36'; Ebagua 63'	Stadium: Stadio Marcantonio Bentegodi; Attendance: 15,801; Referee: Davide Massa

15 October 2011 10	Torino	1–0	Juve Stabia	Turin
15:00 CEST (UTC+02:00)	Bianchi 80'			Stadium: Stadio Olimpico di Torino; Attendance: 15,319; Referee: Emilio Ostinelli

24 October 2011 11	Gubbio	1–0	Torino	Gubbio
20:45 CEST (UTC+02:00)	Ciofani 57'			Stadium: Stadio Pietro Barbetti; Attendance: 4,173; Referee: Riccardo Pinzani

29 October 2011 12	Torino	2–1	Empoli	Turin
15:00 CEST (UTC+02:00)	Ebagua 50'; Darmian 66'		Lazzari 34'	Stadium: Stadio Olimpico di Torino; Attendance: 13,046; Referee: Massimiliano Velotto

1 November 2011 13	Reggina	0–1	Torino	Reggio Calabria
18:00 CET (UTC+01:00)			D'Ambrosio 84'	Stadium: Stadio Oreste Granillo; Attendance: 8,063; Referee: Renzo Candussio

5 November 2011 14	Sassuolo	0–0	Torino	Modena
15:00 CET (UTC+01:00)				Stadium: Stadio Alberto Braglia; Attendance: 4,054; Referee: Leonardo Baracani

13 November 2011 15	Torino	1–1	Bari	Turin
20:45 CET (UTC+01:00)	Antenucci 54'		de Paula 42'	Stadium: Stadio Olimpico di Torino; Attendance: 16,608; Referee: Maurizio Ciampi

19 November 2011 16	Crotone	0–0	Torino	Crotone
15:00 CET (UTC+01:00)				Stadium: Stadio Ezio Scida; Attendance: 4,241; Referee: Luigi Nasca

26 November 2011 17	Torino	1–0	Livorno	Turin
15:00 CET (UTC+01:00)	Parisi 81'			Stadium: Stadio Olimpico di Torino; Attendance: 13,345; Referee: Angelo Martino Giancola

3 December 2011 18	Padova	1–0	Torino	Padova
15:00 CET (UTC+01:00)	Ruopolo 50'			Stadium: Stadio Euganeo; Attendance: 10,851; Referee: Gianpaolo Calvarese
Note: The match was suspended at 76 minute due to a fault in the lighting system. The remaining 14 minutes were played on 14 December at 14:30.

10 December 2011 19	Torino	4–2	Pescara	Turin
15:00 CET (UTC+01:00)	Basha 38'; Vives 53'; Sgrigna 64', 68'		Immobile 48', 90+2'	Stadium: Stadio Olimpico di Torino; Attendance: 16,637; Referee: Dino Tommasi

17 December 2011 20	Modena	2–1	Torino	Modena
15:00 CET (UTC+01:00)	Greco 76' (pen.); Ciaramitaro 87'		Stevanović 35'	Stadium: Stadio Alberto Braglia; Attendance: 5,450; Referee: Emiliano Gallione

6 January 2012 21	Torino	0–0	AlbinoLeffe	Turin
12:30 CET (UTC+01:00)				Stadium: Stadio Olimpico di Torino; Attendance: 15,105; Referee: Luigi Nasca

14 January 2012 22	Torino	2–1	Ascoli	Turin
15:00 CET (UTC+01:00)	Antenucci 19', 66'		Ciofani 28'	Stadium: Stadio Olimpico di Torino; Attendance: 11,828; Referee: Gennaro Palazzino

21 January 2012 23	Cittadella	1–1	Torino	Cittadella
15:00 CET (UTC+01:00)	Gasparetto 6'		Antenucci 17'	Stadium: Stadio Piercesare Tombolato; Attendance: 2,858; Referee: Massimiliano Irrati

28 January 2012 24	Varese	0–0	Torino	Varese
15:00 CET (UTC+01:00)				Stadium: Stadio Franco Ossola; Attendance: 3,280; Referee: Angelo Cervellera

31 January 2012 25	Torino	1–0	Vicenza	Turin
20:45 CET (UTC+01:00)	Tonucci 64' (o.g.)			Stadium: Stadio Olimpico di Torino; Attendance: 10,474; Referee: Renzo Candussio

11 February 2012 27	Torino	3–1	Nocerina	Turin
15:00 CET (UTC+01:00)	D'Ambrosio 8'; Vives 33'; Stevanović 47'		Castaldo 53'	Stadium: Stadio Olimpico di Torino; Attendance: 10,412; Referee: Filippo Merchiori

20 February 2012 28	Torino	2–1	Sampdoria	Turin
20:45 CET (UTC+01:00)	Antenucci 20'; Meggiorini 86'		Antonio 67'	Stadium: Stadio Olimpico di Torino; Attendance: 18,273; Referee: Davide Massa

26 February 2012 26	Brescia	1–0	Torino	Brescia
12:30 CET (UTC+01:00)	Darmian 66' (o.g.)			Stadium: Stadio Mario Rigamonti; Attendance: 6,000; Referee: Maurizio Ciampi
Note: The match was initially scheduled for 6 February but postponed due to a snow.

3 March 2012 29	Grosseto	0–3	Torino	Grosseto
15:00 CET (UTC+01:00)			Oduamadi 12'; Bianchi 90+2'; Antenucci 90+5'	Stadium: Stadio Carlo Zecchini; Attendance: 2,883; Referee: Emilio Ostinelli

12 March 2012 30	Torino	1–4	Hellas Verona	Turin
20:45 CET (UTC+01:00)	Sgrigna 84'		Juanito 24', 56'; Ferrari 37'; Maietta 75'	Stadium: Stadio Olimpico di Torino; Attendance: 21,453; Referee: Riccardo Pinzani

17 March 2012 31	Juve Stabia	1–1	Torino	Castellammare di Stabia
15:00 CET (UTC+01:00)	Sau 34'		Sgrigna 40'	Stadium: Stadio Romeo Menti; Attendance: 4,975; Referee: Dino Tommasi

24 March 2012 32	Torino	6–0	Gubbio	Turin
15:00 CET (UTC+01:00)	Bianchi 40', 68'; Antenucci 46', 80'; Surraco 65'; Pasquato 76'			Stadium: Stadio Olimpico di Torino; Attendance: 12,246; Referee: Angelo Martino Giancola

31 March 2012 33	Empoli	1–0	Torino	Empoli
15:00 CEST (UTC+02:00)	Maccarone 24'			Stadium: Stadio Carlo Castellani; Attendance: 3,405; Referee: Gianpaolo Calvarese

6 April 2012 34	Torino	1–0	Reggina	Turin
19:00 CEST (UTC+02:00)	Glik 16'			Stadium: Stadio Olimpico di Torino; Attendance: 15,640; Referee: Massimiliano Velotto
Note: The match suspended at 46 minute due to a storm. The remaining 45 minutes were played on 25 April at 14:30.

21 April 2012 36	Bari	0–0	Torino	Bari
15:00 CEST (UTC+02:00)				Stadium: Stadio San Nicola; Attendance: 5,286; Referee: Leonardo Baracani

28 April 2012 37	Torino	2–1	Crotone	Turin
15:00 CEST (UTC+02:00)	Glik 3'; Sgrigna 39'		Calil 60' (pen.)	Stadium: Stadio Olimpico di Torino; Attendance: 12,592; Referee: Marco Di Bello

1 May 2012 38	Livorno	0–1	Torino	Livorno
18:00 CEST (UTC+02:00)			Meggiorini 38'	Stadium: Stadio Armando Picchi; Attendance: 4,750; Referee: Davide Massa

7 May 2012 39	Torino	3–1	Padova	Turin
21:00 CEST (UTC+02:00)	Meggiorini 12'; Di Cesare 53'; Antenucci 87'		Cacia 58'	Stadium: Stadio Olimpico di Torino; Attendance: 18,093; Referee: Emilio Ostinelli

12 May 2012 40	Pescara	2–0	Torino	Pescara
18:00 CEST (UTC+02:00)	Insigne 10'; Immobile 45+2'			Stadium: Stadio Adriatico; Attendance: 20,350; Referee: Piero Giacomelli

15 May 2012 35	Torino	3–0	Sassuolo	Turin
20:45 CEST (UTC+02:00)	D'Ambrosio 31'; Basha 52'; Meggiorini 81'			Stadium: Stadio Olimpico di Torino; Attendance: 23,361; Referee: Riccardo Pinzani
Note: The match was initially scheduled for 16 April but postponed due to the suspension of the season following the death of Piermario Morosini.

20 May 2012 41	Torino	2–0	Modena	Turin
12:30 CEST (UTC+02:00)	Oduamadi 24'; De Feudis 83'			Stadium: Stadio Olimpico di Torino; Attendance: 25,529; Referee: Leonardo Baracani

26 May 2012 42	AlbinoLeffe	0–0	Torino	Bergamo
20:45 CEST (UTC+02:00)				Stadium: Stadio Atleti Azzurri d'Italia; Attendance: 3,376; Referee: Massimiliano Irrati

=== Coppa Italia ===
13 August 2011 Second round	Torino	1–0	Lumezzane	Turin
20:45 CEST (UTC+02:00)	Antenucci 64'			Stadium: Stadio Olimpico di Torino; Attendance: 9,689; Referee: Filippo Merchiori

21 August 2011 Third round	Siena	1–0	Torino	Siena
20:45 CEST (UTC+02:00)	Calaiò 80' (pen.)			Stadium: Stadio Artemio Franchi – Montepaschi Arena; Attendance: 6,007; Referee: Paolo Valeri
