= 2016–17 Torino FC season =

Torino
2016–17 season
- President: Urbano Cairo
- Manager: Siniša Mihajlović
- Stadium: Stadio Olimpico Grande Torino
- Serie A: 9th
- Coppa Italia: Round of 16
- Top goalscorer: League: Andrea Belotti (26); All: Andrea Belotti (28)
- Highest home attendance: 26,500 vs Internazionale (18 March 2017, Serie A)
- Lowest home attendance: 10,875 vs Pisa (29 November 2016, Coppa Italia)
- Average home league attendance: 19,327
Home colours	Away colours	Third colours

The 2016–17 season was Torino Football Club's 106th season of competitive football, 89th season in the top division of Italian football and 72nd season in Serie A. The club competed in Serie A and in the Coppa Italia.

In the league Torino enjoyed a mixed campaign, finishing 9th with 53 points but scoring 71 goals, including 26 from Italian striker Andrea Belotti, who finished three goals below capocannoniere and Roma striker Edin Džeko. The season was also the first in charge of Torino for Serbian coach and former player Siniša Mihajlović.

== Players ==
=== Squad information ===
As of 2 February 2017

Note: Flags indicate national team as defined under FIFA eligibility rules; some limited exceptions apply. Players may hold more than one non-FIFA nationality.

No.	Pos.	Nation	Player
1	GK	ITA	Daniele Padelli
2	DF	BRA	Bruno Peres
3	DF	ITA	Cristian Molinaro
4	DF	BRA	Leandro Castán (on loan from Roma)
5	DF	BRA	Carlão
6	MF	GHA	Afriyie Acquah
7	DF	ITA	Davide Zappacosta
8	MF	ITA	Daniele Baselli
9	FW	ITA	Andrea Belotti
10	FW	SRB	Adem Ljajić
11	FW	ARG	Maxi López
13	DF	ITA	Luca Rossettini
14	FW	ESP	Iago Falque
15	MF	ITA	Marco Benassi (vice-captain)
16	MF	SWE	Samuel Gustafson

No.	Pos.	Nation	Player
17	FW	VEN	Josef Martínez
18	MF	ITA	Mirko Valdifiori
19	FW	PAR	Juan Iturbe (on loan from Roma)
20	DF	URU	Gastón Silva
21	GK	ENG	Joe Hart (on loan from Manchester City)
22	MF	NGA	Joel Obi
23	DF	ITA	Antonio Barreca
24	DF	ITA	Emiliano Moretti (captain)
25	MF	SRB	Saša Lukić
26	DF	BRA	Danilo Avelar
27	DF	ITA	Marco Chiosa
29	DF	ITA	Lorenzo De Silvestri
31	FW	ARG	Lucas Boyé
93	DF	ALB	Arlind Ajeti

== Transfers ==
=== In ===
Date	Pos.	Player	Age	Moving from	Fee	Notes	Source
1 February 2016	FW	(Argentina) Lucas Boyé	19	(Argentina) Newell's Old Boys	Undisclosed		
10 July 2016	DF	(Albania) Arlind Ajeti	22	(Italy) Frosinone	Free		
18 July 2016	FW	(Serbia) Adem Ljajić	24	(Italy) Roma	€8,500,000		
29 July 2016	MF	(Serbia) Saša Lukić	25	(Serbia) Teleoptik	€2,500,000		
5 August 2016	MF	(Greece) Panagiotis Tachtsidis	25	(Italy) Genoa	€1,300,000		
9 August 2016	MF	(Sweden) Samuel Gustafson	21	(Sweden) Häcken	Undisclosed		
16 August 2016	DF	(Italy) Luca Rossettini	31	(Italy) Bologna	€2,000,000		
18 August 2016	DF	(Italy) Lorenzo De Silvestri	28	(Italy) Sampdoria	€3,750,000		
4 January 2017	FW	(Spain) Iago Falque	27	(Italy) Roma	€6,000,000	Bought out loan	
9 January 2017	DF	(Brazil) Carlão	30	(Cyprus) APOEL	Undisclosed		

==== Loans in ====
Date	Pos.	Player	Age	Moving from	Fee	Notes	Source
18 July 2016	FW	(Spain) Iago Falque	26	(Italy) Roma	Loan	Loan with an option to buy	
17 August 2016	DF	(Brazil) Leandro Castán	29	(Italy) Roma	Loan		
31 August 2016	GK	(England) Joe Hart	29	(England) Manchester City	€1,000,000		
4 January 2017	FW	(Paraguay) Juan Iturbe	23	(Italy) Roma	Loan	Loan with an option to buy for €12.5M	

=== Out ===
Date	Pos.	Player	Age	Moving to	Fee	Notes	Source
28 June 2016	DF	(Ukraine) Vasyl Pryima	25	(Italy) Frosinone	Free		
9 July 2016	GK	(Senegal) Lys Gomis	26	(Italy) Lecce	Undisclosed		
4 July 2016	DF	(Poland) Kamil Glik	28	(France) Monaco	Undisclosed		
2 August 2016	DF	(Italy) Alessandro Gazzi	33	(Italy) Palermo	€700,000		
4 January 2017	DF	(Italy) Cesare Bovo	33	(Italy) Pescara	Undisclosed		

==== Loans out ====
Date	Pos.	Player	Age	Moving to	Fee	Notes	Source
9 July 2016	DF	(Italy) Marco Chiosa	22	(Italy) Perugia	Loan		
18 July 2016	DF	(Italy) Lorenzo Carissoni	19	(Italy) Trapani	Loan		
11 August 2016	MF	(Italy) Vittorio Parigini	20	(Italy) Chievo	Loan		
16 August 2016	DF	(Brazil) Bruno Peres	26	(Italy) Roma	€1,000,000	Loan with an option to buy for €12,500,000	
18 August 2016	DF	(Uruguay) Gastón Silva	22	(Spain) Granada	Loan		
2 February 2017	FW	(Venezuela) Josef Martínez	23	(United States) Atlanta United	Loan	Loan with an option to buy for €4.7M	

== Pre-season and friendlies ==
27 July 2016 Eusébio Cup	Benfica (Portugal)	1–1 (5–6 p)	(Italy) Torino	Lisbon, Portugal
20:45 CEST (UTC+02:00)	Vives 12' (o.g.)		Ljajić 32'	Stadium: Estádio da Luz; Attendance: 60,000; Referee: Fabio Verissimo
	Penalties
	Jiménez (penalty scored); Jonas (penalty scored); Grimaldo (penalty scored); Samaris (penalty scored); Pizzi (penalty scored); Lindelöf (penalty missed)		(penalty scored) Baselli; (penalty scored) Aramu; (penalty scored) Boyé; (penalty scored) Martínez; (penalty scored) López; (penalty scored) Silva

2 August 2016 Friendly	Torino (Italy)	1–0	(Germany) FC Ingolstadt	Schwaz, Austria
18:30 CEST (UTC+02:00)	Belotti 7'			Stadium: Silberstadt Arena; Attendance: 500; Referee: Andreas Heiss

4 August 2016 Friendly	Torino (Italy)	0–0	(Germany) RB Leipzig	Kufstein, Austria
18:30 CEST (UTC+02:00)				Stadium: Kufstein Arena; Attendance: 1,500; Referee: Michael Egger

6 August 2016 Friendly	Torino (Italy)	2–1	(England) Hull City	Salzburg, Austria
16:00 CEST (UTC+02:00)	Belotti 18'; Bovo 83'		Hernández 25'	Stadium: MyPhone Austria Stadion; Referee: Florian Jäger

== Competitions ==
=== Overall ===
Competition	Started round	Current position	Final position	First match	Last match
Serie A	Matchday 1	—	9th	21 August 2016	28 May 2017
Coppa Italia	Third round	—	Round of 16	13 August 2016	12 January 2017

Last updated: 28 May 2017

=== Serie A ===
==== League table ====
Pos	Team	Pld	W	D	L	GF	GA	GD	Pts
7	Internazionale	38	19	5	14	72	49	+23	62
8	Fiorentina	38	16	12	10	63	57	+6	60
9	Torino	38	13	14	11	71	66	+5	53
10	Sampdoria	38	12	12	14	49	55	−6	48
11	Cagliari	38	14	5	19	55	76	−21	47

Source: Serie A, Soccerway
Rules for classification: 1) Points; 2) Head-to-head points; 3) Head-to-head goal difference; 4) Goal difference; 5) Goals scored; 6) Draw.

==== Results summary ====
Overall								Home						Away					
Pld	W	D	L	GF	GA	GD	Pts	W	D	L	GF	GA	GD	W	D	L	GF	GA	GD
38	13	14	11	71	66	+5	53	9	8	2	43	31	+12	4	6	9	28	35	−7

Last updated: 28 May 2017.
Source: Competitive matches

==== Results by round ====
Round	1	2	3	4	5	6	7	8	9	10	11	12	13	14	15	16	17	18	19	20	21	22	23	24	25	26	27	28	29	30	31	32	33	34	35	36	37	38
Ground	A	H	A	H	A	H	H	A	H	A	A	H	A	H	A	H	A	H	A	H	A	H	A	H	A	A	H	A	H	H	A	H	A	H	A	H	A	H
Result	L	W	L	D	D	W	W	W	D	L	D	W	W	W	L	L	L	W	D	D	L	D	D	W	L	D	W	L	D	D	W	D	W	D	D	L	L	W
Position	13	7	12	14	14	10	7	4	5	8	7	7	7	6	7	8	9	8	8	8	9	9	9	9	9	9	9	10	10	10	10	10	9	9	9	9	9	9

Updated to match(es) played on 28 May 2017. Source: Competitive matches
A = Away; H = Home; W = Win; D = Draw; L = Loss

==== Matches ====
21 August 2016 1	Milan	3–2	Torino	Milan
18:00 CEST (UTC+02:00)	Bacca 38', 50', 62' (pen.); Paletta (yellow card) 45' (yellow-red card) 90+4'	Report	Martínez (yellow card) 26'; Rossettini (yellow card) 35'; Belotti 48'; Obi (yellow card) 61'; Baselli 90+1'	Stadium: San Siro; Attendance: 32,254; Referee: Antonio Damato

28 August 2016 2	Torino	5–1	Bologna	Turin
20:45 CEST (UTC+02:00)	Belotti 28', 38', 89'; Bovo (yellow card) 50'; Martínez 53'; Baselli 80'	Report	Taïder 32'; Pulgar (yellow card) 46'; Gastaldello (yellow card) 63'	Stadium: Stadio Olimpico Grande Torino; Attendance: 17,077; Referee: Gianluca Rocchi

11 September 2016 3	Atalanta	2–1	Torino	Bergamo
15:00 CEST (UTC+02:00)	Pinilla (yellow card) 35'; Toloi (yellow card) 53'; Masiello 56'; Kessié 82' (pen.)	Report	Bovo (yellow card) 3'; Falque 54'; Acquah (yellow card) 90+4'	Stadium: Stadio Atleti Azzurri d'Italia; Attendance: 14,925; Referee: Maurizio Mariani

18 September 2016 4	Torino	0–0	Empoli	Turin
15:00 CEST (UTC+02:00)	Molinaro (yellow card) 11'; Boyé (yellow card) 25'; Valdifiori (yellow card) 34'; Baselli (yellow card) 78'	Report	Tello (yellow card) 4'; Bellusci (yellow card) 41'; Dioussé (yellow card) 76'	Stadium: Stadio Olimpico Grande Torino; Attendance: 16,403; Referee: Daniele Chiffi

21 September 2016 5	Pescara	0–0	Torino	Pescara
20:45 CEST (UTC+02:00)	Fornasier (yellow card) 41'; Biraghi (yellow card) 56'; Caprari (yellow card) 57'	Report	Acquah (yellow card) 26' (yellow-red card) 45'; Martínez (yellow card) 53'; Vives (red card) 78'; Hart (yellow card) 90+3'	Stadium: Stadio Adriatico – Giovanni Cornacchia; Attendance: 13,703; Referee: Luca Banti

25 September 2016 6	Torino	3–1	Roma	Turin
12:30 CEST (UTC+02:00)	Belotti 8'; Falque 53' (pen.), 65'; Hart (yellow card) 79'	Report	De Rossi (yellow card) 12'; Totti 55' (pen.); Peres (yellow card) 56'; Florenzi (yellow card) 69'; Manolas (yellow card) 86'	Stadium: Stadio Olimpico Grande Torino; Attendance: 19,275; Referee: Paolo Tagliavento

2 October 2016 7	Torino	2–1	Fiorentina	Turin
18:00 CEST (UTC+02:00)	Falque 15'; Castán (yellow card) 36'; Benassi 60'	Report	Sánchez (yellow card) 55'; Salcedo (yellow card) 80'; Babacar 84'	Stadium: Stadio Olimpico Grande Torino; Attendance: 21,641; Referee: Gianpaolo Calvarese

17 October 2016 8	Palermo	1–4	Torino	Palermo
20:45 CEST (UTC+02:00)	Chochev 5', (yellow card) 37'; Vitiello (yellow card) 33'; González (yellow card) 57'; Anđelković (yellow card) 69'	Report	Ljajić 25', 40', (yellow card) 41'; Benassi 45+1'; Baselli 50'; Boyé (yellow card) 80'	Stadium: Stadio Renzo Barbera; Attendance: 15,961; Referee: Michael Fabbri

23 October 2016 9	Torino	2–2	Lazio	Turin
15:00 CEST (UTC+02:00)	Falque 20'; Barreca (yellow card) 29'; Belotti (yellow card) 61'; Ljajić 90+2' (pen.)	Report	Parolo (yellow card) 59'; Immobile 71'; Murgia 84'; Cataldi (yellow card) 90+1'	Stadium: Stadio Olimpico Grande Torino; Attendance: 21,517; Referee: Piero Giacomelli

26 October 2016 10	Internazionale	2–1	Torino	Milan
20:45 CEST (UTC+02:00)	Icardi 35', 88'	Report	Valdifiori (yellow card) 28'; Belotti 63', (yellow card) 90+3'; López (yellow card) 80'; Benassi (yellow card) 90'	Stadium: San Siro; Attendance: 36,446; Referee: Davide Massa

31 October 2016 11	Udinese	2–2	Torino	Udine
19:00 CET (UTC+01:00)	Danilo (yellow card) 35'; Théréau 60'; Zapata 70', (yellow card) 71'	Report	Benassi 15'; Boyé (yellow card) 20'; Valdifiori (yellow card) 29'; Moretti (yellow card) 39'; Ljajić 77'	Stadium: Stadio Friuli; Attendance: 19,984; Referee: Paolo Tagliavento

5 November 2016 12	Torino	5–1	Cagliari	Turin
18:00 CET (UTC+01:00)	Belotti 2', 59' (pen.); Ljajić 11'; Baselli (yellow card) 27', (goal) 51'; Benassi 38'	Report	Melchiorri 41'; Farias (yellow card) 58'; Dessena (red card) 58'; Ceppitelli (yellow card) 74'	Stadium: Stadio Olimpico Grande Torino; Attendance: 19,870; Referee: Maurizio Mariani

20 November 2016 13	Crotone	0–2	Torino	Crotone
15:00 CET (UTC+01:00)	Palladino (yellow card) 47'	Report	Martínez (yellow card) 71'; Belotti 80', 89'	Stadium: Stadio Ezio Scida; Attendance: 7,759; Referee: Domenico Celi

26 November 2016 14	Torino	2–1	Chievo	Turin
18:00 CET (UTC+01:00)	Ljajić (yellow card) 13'; Falque 35', 38'; Castán (yellow card) 65'	Report	Dainelli (yellow card) 24'; Inglese 85'; Cacciatore (red card) 89'	Stadium: Stadio Olimpico Grande Torino; Attendance: 18,530; Referee: Daniele Chiffi

4 December 2016 15	Sampdoria	2–0	Torino	Genoa
15:00 CET (UTC+01:00)	Barreto (yellow card) 29', (goal) 51'; Schick 90+5'	Report	Rossettini (yellow card) 22'; Benassi (yellow card) 58'; Barreca (yellow card) 58'; Baselli (yellow card) 72'	Stadium: Stadio Luigi Ferraris; Attendance: 19,279; Referee: Daniele Orsato

11 December 2016 16	Torino	1–3	Juventus	Turin
15:00 CET (UTC+01:00)	Belotti 16'; Castán (yellow card) 35'	Report	Higuaín 28', 82'; Mandžukić (yellow card) 36'; Rugani (yellow card) 56'; Pjanić 90+2'	Stadium: Stadio Olimpico Grande Torino; Attendance: 26,436; Referee: Gianluca Rocchi

18 December 2016 17	Napoli	5–3	Torino	Naples
20:45 CET (UTC+01:00)	Mertens 13', 18' (pen.), 22', 80'; Chiricheș 70'	Report	Rossettini (yellow card) 34', (goal) 76'; Belotti 58'; Moretti (yellow card) 60'; Lukić (yellow card) 72'; Falque 84' (pen.)	Stadium: Stadio San Paolo; Attendance: 29,221; Referee: Daniele Doveri

22 December 2016 18	Torino	1–0	Genoa	Turin
20:45 CET (UTC+01:00)	Castán (yellow card) 44'; Belotti 49', (yellow card) 66'	Report	Muñoz (yellow card) 16'; Izzo (yellow card) 71'; Ninković (yellow card) 72'; Burdisso (yellow card) 85'	Stadium: Stadio Olimpico Grande Torino; Attendance: 16,002; Referee: Fabio Maresca

8 January 2017 19	Sassuolo	0–0	Torino	Reggio Emilia
15:00 CET (UTC+01:00)	Berardi (yellow card) 85'; Ragusa (yellow card) 90+2'	Report	Belotti (yellow card) 65'; Valdifiori (yellow card) 76'; Baselli (yellow card) 90+2'	Stadium: Mapei Stadium – Città del Tricolore; Attendance: 11,805; Referee: Massimiliano Irrati

16 January 2017 20	Torino	2–2	Milan	Turin
20:45 CET (UTC+01:00)	Belotti 21', (yellow card) 50'; Benassi 26'; Moretti (yellow card) 40'; Obi (yellow card) 57'; Rossettini (yellow card) 59'; Falque (yellow card) 79'	Report	Locatelli (yellow card) 25'; Romagnoli (yellow card) 45' (yellow-red card) 89'; Bertolacci 55'; Bacca 60' (pen.)	Stadium: Stadio Olimpico Grande Torino; Attendance: 22,418; Referee: Paolo Tagliavento

22 January 2017 21	Bologna	2–0	Torino	Bologna
15:00 CET (UTC+01:00)	Džemaili (yellow card) 38', (goal) 43', 83'; Destro (yellow card) 63'	Report	Benassi (yellow card) 45+2'; De Silvestri (yellow card) 76'	Stadium: Stadio Renato Dall'Ara; Attendance: 17,820; Referee: Davide Ghersini

29 January 2017 22	Torino	1–1	Atalanta	Turin
12:30 CET (UTC+01:00)	Falque 16'; Moretti (yellow card) 68'	Report	Freuler (yellow card) 2'; Caldara (yellow card) 62'; Petagna 66'	Stadium: Stadio Olimpico Grande Torino; Attendance: 15,565; Referee: Antonio Damato

5 February 2017 23	Empoli	1–1	Torino	Empoli
15:00 CET (UTC+01:00)	Krunić (yellow card) 39'; El Kaddouri (yellow card) 42'; Mchedlidze (yellow card) 43'; Pucciarelli 45+2'; Dioussé (yellow card) 50'; Bellusci (yellow card) 59'; Dimarco (yellow card) 90+3'	Report	Belotti 11'; Valdifiori (yellow card) 33'; Baselli (yellow card) 55'; Iturbe (yellow card) 80'; Obi (yellow card) 86'	Stadium: Stadio Carlo Castellani; Attendance: 7,725; Referee: Marco Di Bello

12 February 2017 24	Torino	5–3	Pescara	Turin
15:00 CET (UTC+01:00)	Falque 2'; Ajeti 9'; Belotti 15', 61'; Lukić (yellow card) 31'; Ljajić 53'	Report	Stendardo (yellow card) 3'; Fornasier (yellow card) 24'; Ajeti 73' (o.g.); Benali 75', 83'; Coda (yellow card) 90'	Stadium: Stadio Olimpico Grande Torino; Attendance: 14,827; Referee: Fabio Maresca

19 February 2017 25	Roma	4–1	Torino	Rome
18:00 CET (UTC+01:00)	Džeko 10'; Salah 17'; Paredes 65'; Nainggolan 90+1'	Report	Lukić (yellow card) 56'; Benassi (yellow card) 61'; López 84'	Stadium: Stadio Olimpico; Attendance: 31,165; Referee: Marco Guida

27 February 2017 26	Fiorentina	2–2	Torino	Florence
20:45 CET (UTC+01:00)	Saponara 8', (yellow card) 42'; Kalinić 38'	Report	Lukić (yellow card) 27'; Benassi (yellow card) 34'; Belotti 65', 85'	Stadium: Stadio Artemio Franchi; Attendance: 23,260; Referee: Piero Giacomelli

5 March 2017 27	Torino	3–1	Palermo	Turin
15:00 CET (UTC+01:00)	Belotti 73', 76', 81'	Report	Balogh (yellow card) 27' (yellow-red card) 78'; Rispoli 30', (yellow card) 33'; Sallai (yellow card) 56'	Stadium: Stadio Olimpico Grande Torino; Attendance: 16,098; Referee: Nicola Rizzoli

13 March 2017 28	Lazio	3–1	Torino	Rome
20:45 CET (UTC+01:00)	Lukaku (yellow card) 44'; Immobile 56'; Milinković-Savić (yellow card) 74'; Parolo (yellow card) 86'; Keita 87'; Felipe Anderson 90'	Report	Ljajić (yellow card) 38'; López 72'	Stadium: Stadio Olimpico; Attendance: 15,000; Referee: Paolo Mazzoleni

18 March 2017 29	Torino	2–2	Internazionale	Turin
18:00 CET (UTC+01:00)	Baselli 33'; Acquah 59'; López (yellow card) 90+6'	Report	Kondogbia 27'; Candreva 62'	Stadium: Stadio Olimpico Grande Torino; Attendance: 26,500; Referee: Luca Banti

2 April 2017 30	Torino	2–2	Udinese	Turin
12:30 CEST (UTC+02:00)	Rossettini (yellow card) 5'; Moretti 70'; Belotti 83'	Report	Kums (yellow card) 9'; Jankto 50', (yellow card) 90+1'; Angella (yellow card) 54'; Perica 68'	Stadium: Stadio Olimpico Grande Torino; Attendance: 17,882; Referee: Davide Ghersini

9 April 2017 31	Cagliari	2–3	Torino	Cagliari
15:00 CEST (UTC+02:00)	Borriello 19' (pen.); Pisacane (yellow card) 31'; João Pedro (yellow card) 69'; Han Kwang-song 90+5'	Report	Carlão (yellow card) 18'; Ljajić 33', (yellow card) 43'; Belotti 39'; Acquah (yellow card) 24' (yellow-red card) 90+1', (goal) 53'; Falque (yellow card) 90'; Padelli (yellow card) 90+1'	Stadium: Stadio Sant'Elia; Attendance: 12,103; Referee: Gianluca Rocchi

15 April 2017 32	Torino	1–1	Crotone	Turin
15:00 CEST (UTC+02:00)	Rossettini (yellow card) 43'; Belotti 66' (pen.); Lukić (yellow card) 85'	Report	Cordaz (yellow card) 63'; Ceccherini (yellow card) 65'; Rosi (yellow card) 69'; Simy 81'	Stadium: Stadio Olimpico Grande Torino; Attendance: 18,750; Referee: Daniele Doveri

23 April 2017 33	Chievo	1–3	Torino	Verona
15:00 CEST (UTC+02:00)	Pellissier 65'; Kiyine (yellow card) 80'	Report	Ljajić 52'; Zappacosta 56', (yellow card) 77'; Falque 75'	Stadium: Stadio Marc'Antonio Bentegodi; Attendance: 10,000; Referee: Maurizio Mariani

29 April 2017 34	Torino	1–1	Sampdoria	Turin
20:45 CEST (UTC+02:00)	Avelar (yellow card) 36'; Iturbe 78'	Report	Schick 12'; Praet (yellow card) 77'; Regini (yellow card) 80'	Stadium: Stadio Olimpico Grande Torino; Attendance: 17,349; Referee: Davide Massa

6 May 2017 35	Juventus	1–1	Torino	Turin
20:45 CEST (UTC+02:00)	Asamoah (yellow card) 51'; Dybala (yellow card) 53'; Cuadrado (yellow card) 76'; Higuaín 90+2'	Report	Moretti (yellow card) 13'; Acquah (yellow card) 38' (yellow-red card) 57'; Molinaro (yellow card) 42'; Ljajić 52'	Stadium: Juventus Stadium; Attendance: 40,462; Referee: Paolo Valeri

14 May 2017 36	Torino	0–5	Napoli	Turin
15:00 CEST (UTC+02:00)	Baselli (yellow card) 8'; Gustafson (yellow card) 53'	Report	Callejón 7', 76'; Albiol (yellow card) 57'; Insigne 60'; Mertens 72'; Zieliński 78'	Stadium: Stadio Olimpico Grande Torino; Attendance: 24,267; Referee: Massimiliano Irrati

21 May 2017 37	Genoa	2–1	Torino	Genoa
15:00 CEST (UTC+02:00)	Rigoni (yellow card) 3', (goal) 32'; Veloso (yellow card) 49'; Simeone 54'	Report	Rossettini (yellow card) 10'; Acquah (yellow card) 36'; Lukić (yellow card) 45+2'; Ljajić (yellow card) 49', (goal) 89'; Boyé (yellow card) 80'	Stadium: Stadio Luigi Ferraris; Attendance: 26,106; Referee: Marco Guida

28 May 2017 38	Torino	5–3	Sassuolo	Turin
20:45 CEST (UTC+02:00)	Boyé 6', (yellow card) 18'; Baselli 22'; De Silvestri 45+1'; Falque 57'; Belotti 79'; Rossettini (yellow card) 90+3'	Report	Defrel 14', 40', 81' (pen.)	Stadium: Stadio Olimpico Grande Torino; Attendance: 16,803; Referee: Antonio Rapuano

=== Coppa Italia ===
13 August 2016 Third round	Torino	4–1	Pro Vercelli	Turin
20:30 CEST (UTC+02:00)	Ljajić 7'; Martínez 25'; Peres 50'; Acquah (yellow card) 80'; Baselli (yellow card) 84'; Boyé 87'	Report	Mustacchio (yellow card) 18'; Legati (yellow card) 40'; La Mantia 56'	Stadium: Stadio Olimpico Grande Torino; Attendance: 13,356; Referee: Domenico Celi

29 November 2016 Fourth round	Torino	4–0 (a.e.t.)	Pisa	Turin
21:00 CET (UTC+01:00)	Ajeti (yellow card) 60'; Ljajić 93'; López 111'; Boyé 113'; Belotti 117'	Report	Montella (yellow card) 45+2'; Lisuzzo (yellow card) 90+4'	Stadium: Stadio Olimpico Grande Torino; Attendance: 10,875; Referee: Piero Giacomelli

12 January 2017 Round of 16	Milan	2–1	Torino	Milan
21:00 CET (UTC+01:00)	Lapadula (yellow card) 49'; Kucka 61'; Bonaventura 64'; Abate (yellow card) 78'	Report	Belotti 27'; Barreca (yellow card) 57' (yellow-red card) 87'	Stadium: San Siro; Attendance: 13,892; Referee: Carmine Russo

== Statistics ==
=== Appearances and goals ===
No.	Pos	Nat	Player	Total		Serie A		Coppa Italia	
No.	Pos	Nat	Player	Apps	Goals	Apps	Goals	Apps	Goals
Goalkeepers
1	GK	(Italy) ITA	Daniele Padelli	4	0	2	0	2	0
21	GK	(England) ENG	Joe Hart	37	0	36	0	1	0
Defenders
3	DF	(Italy) ITA	Cristian Molinaro	10	0	9+1	0	0	0
4	DF	(Brazil) BRA	Leandro Castán	14	0	13+1	0	0	0
5	DF	(Brazil) BRA	Carlão	4	0	4	0	0	0
7	DF	(Italy) ITA	Davide Zappacosta	29	1	25+4	1	0	0
13	DF	(Italy) ITA	Luca Rossettini	31	1	29+1	1	1	0
23	DF	(Italy) ITA	Antonio Barreca	30	0	25+3	0	2	0
24	DF	(Italy) ITA	Emiliano Moretti	26	1	23	1	3	0
26	DF	(Brazil) BRA	Danilo Avelar	3	0	3	0	0	0
29	DF	(Italy) ITA	Lorenzo De Silvestri	18	1	15+1	1	2	0
93	DF	(Albania) ALB	Arlind Ajeti	5	1	3+1	1	1	0
Midfielders
6	MF	(Ghana) GHA	Afriyie Acquah	22	2	13+7	2	2	0
8	MF	(Italy) ITA	Daniele Baselli	39	6	28+9	6	1+1	0
15	MF	(Italy) ITA	Marco Benassi	29	5	24+4	5	1	0
16	MF	(Sweden) SWE	Samuel Gustafson	6	0	1+4	0	0+1	0
18	MF	(Italy) ITA	Mirko Valdifiori	25	0	22+2	0	1	0
22	MF	(Nigeria) NGA	Joel Obi	23	0	9+11	0	2+1	0
25	MF	(Serbia) SRB	Saša Lukić	15	0	7+7	0	1	0
Forwards
9	FW	(Italy) ITA	Andrea Belotti	38	28	34+1	26	2+1	2
10	FW	(Serbia) SRB	Adem Ljajić	36	12	30+3	10	2+1	2
11	FW	(Argentina) ARG	Maxi López	18	3	2+14	2	1+1	1
14	FW	(Spain) ESP	Iago Falque	35	12	31+4	12	0	0
19	FW	(Paraguay) PAR	Juan Iturbe	17	1	4+12	1	1	0
31	FW	(Argentina) ARG	Lucas Boyé	33	3	14+16	1	1+2	2
Players transferred out during the season
5	DF	(Italy) ITA	Cesare Bovo	6	0	4	0	2	0
17	FW	(Venezuela) VEN	Josef Martínez	13	2	4+7	1	2	1
20	MF	(Italy) ITA	Giuseppe Vives	4	0	3	0	1	0
30	FW	(Italy) ITA	Mattia Aramu	2	0	1	0	0+1	0
33	DF	(Brazil) BRA	Bruno Peres	1	1	0	0	1	1

Last updated: 28 May 2017
Source: Competitions

=== Goalscorers ===
Rank	No.	Pos	Nat	Name	Serie A	Coppa Italia	Total
1	9	FW	(Italy)	Andrea Belotti	26	2	28
2	10	FW	(Serbia)	Adem Ljajić	10	2	12
2	14	FW	(Spain)	Iago Falque	12	0	12
4	8	MF	(Italy)	Daniele Baselli	6	0	6
5	15	MF	(Italy)	Marco Benassi	5	0	5
6	11	FW	(Argentina)	Maxi López	2	1	3
6	31	FW	(Argentina)	Lucas Boyé	1	2	3
8	6	MF	(Ghana)	Afriyie Acquah	2	0	2
8	17	FW	(Venezuela)	Josef Martínez	1	1	2
10	7	DF	(Italy)	Davide Zappacosta	1	0	1
10	13	DF	(Italy)	Luca Rossettini	1	0	1
10	19	FW	(Paraguay)	Juan Iturbe	1	0	1
10	24	DF	(Italy)	Emiliano Moretti	1	0	1
10	29	DF	(Italy)	Lorenzo De Silvestri	1	0	1
10	33	DF	(Brazil)	Bruno Peres	0	1	1
10	93	DF	(Albania)	Arlind Ajeti	1	0	1
Own goal					0	0	0
Totals					71	9	80

Last updated: 28 May 2017

=== Clean sheets ===
Rank	No.	Pos	Nat	Name	Serie A	Coppa Italia	Total
1	21	GK	(England)	Joe Hart	5	0	5
2	1	GK	(Italy)	Daniele Padelli	0	1	1
Totals					5	1	6

Last updated: 28 May 2017

=== Disciplinary record ===
No.	Pos	Nat	Player	Serie A			Coppa Italia			Total		
No.	Pos	Nat	Player	Booked	(yellow card) (yellow-red card)	Sent off (straight red)	Booked	(yellow card) (yellow-red card)	Sent off (straight red)	Booked	(yellow card) (yellow-red card)	Sent off (straight red)
1	GK	(Italy)	Daniele Padelli	1	0	0	0	0	0	1	0	0
21	GK	(England)	Joe Hart	2	0	0	0	0	0	2	0	0
3	DF	(Italy)	Cristian Molinaro	2	0	0	0	0	0	2	0	0
4	DF	(Brazil)	Leandro Castán	4	0	0	0	0	0	4	0	0
5	DF	(Italy)	Cesare Bovo	2	0	0	0	0	0	2	0	0
5	DF	(Brazil)	Carlão	1	0	0	0	0	0	1	0	0
7	DF	(Italy)	Davide Zappacosta	1	0	0	0	0	0	1	0	0
13	DF	(Italy)	Luca Rossettini	8	0	0	0	0	0	8	0	0
23	DF	(Italy)	Antonio Barreca	2	0	0	0	1	0	2	1	0
24	DF	(Italy)	Emiliano Moretti	5	0	0	0	0	0	5	0	0
26	DF	(Brazil)	Danilo Avelar	1	0	0	0	0	0	1	0	0
29	DF	(Italy)	Lorenzo De Silvestri	1	0	0	0	0	0	1	0	0
93	DF	(Albania)	Arlind Ajeti	0	0	0	1	0	0	1	0	0
6	MF	(Ghana)	Afriyie Acquah	2	3	0	1	0	0	3	3	0
8	MF	(Italy)	Daniele Baselli	6	0	0	1	0	0	7	0	0
15	MF	(Italy)	Marco Benassi	5	0	0	0	0	0	5	0	0
16	MF	(Sweden)	Samuel Gustafson	1	0	0	0	0	0	1	0	0
18	MF	(Italy)	Mirko Valdifiori	5	0	0	0	0	0	5	0	0
20	MF	(Italy)	Giuseppe Vives	0	0	1	0	0	0	0	0	1
22	MF	(Nigeria)	Joel Obi	3	0	0	0	0	0	3	0	0
25	MF	(Serbia)	Saša Lukić	6	0	0	0	0	0	6	0	0
9	FW	(Italy)	Andrea Belotti	5	0	0	0	0	0	5	0	0
10	FW	(Serbia)	Adem Ljajić	5	0	0	0	0	0	5	0	0
11	FW	(Argentina)	Maxi López	2	0	0	0	0	0	2	0	0
14	FW	(Spain)	Iago Falque	2	0	0	0	0	0	2	0	0
17	FW	(Venezuela)	Josef Martínez	3	0	0	0	0	0	3	0	0
19	FW	(Paraguay)	Juan Iturbe	1	0	0	0	0	0	1	0	0
30	FW	(Italy)	Mattia Aramu	0	0	0	0	0	0	0	0	0
31	FW	(Argentina)	Lucas Boyé	5	0	0	0	0	0	5	0	0
Totals				81	3	1	3	1	0	84	4	1

Last updated: 28 May 2017
