= 2017–18 Torino FC season =

Torino
2017–18 season
- President: Urbano Cairo
- Manager: Siniša Mihajlović (until 4 January 2018); Walter Mazzarri (from 4 January 2018)
- Stadium: Stadio Olimpico Grande Torino
- Serie A: 9th
- Coppa Italia: Quarter-finals
- Top goalscorer: League: Iago Falque (12); All: Iago Falque (14)
- Highest home attendance: 26,105 vs Juventus (18 February 2018, Serie A)
- Lowest home attendance: 3,931 vs Carpi (29 November 2017, Coppa Italia)
- Average home league attendance: 18,596
Home colours	Away colours	Third colours

The 2017–18 season was Torino Football Club's 107th season of competitive football, 90th season in the top division of Italian football and 73rd season in Serie A. The club competed in Serie A and in the Coppa Italia.

The season was Serbian coach Siniša Mihajlović's second at the club; however, following a first half of the season in which Torino drew ten and won only five matches in Serie A, he was sacked on 4 January 2018. Former Napoli and Inter coach Walter Mazzarri was appointed to be Mihajlović's replacement the same day.

In Serie A Torino repeated last season's 9th place finish; they were eliminated in the Coppa Italia quarter-finals by city rivals and eventual winners Juventus.

== Players ==
=== Squad information ===
Last updated on 20 May 2018
Appearances include league matches only

No.	Name	Nat	Position(s)	Date of birth (Age at end of season)	Signed from	Signed in	Contract ends	Apps.	Goals
Goalkeepers
1	Salvador Ichazo	(Uruguay)	GK	26 January 1992 (aged 26)	(Uruguay) Danubio	2015	2019	4	0
32	Vanja Milinković-Savić	(Serbia)	GK	20 February 1997 (aged 21)	(Poland) Lechia Gdańsk	2017	2021	1	0
39	Salvatore Sirigu	(Italy)	GK	12 January 1987 (aged 31)	(France) Paris Saint-Germain	2017	2019	37	0
Defenders
3	Cristian Molinaro	(Italy)	LB / LWB	30 July 1983 (aged 34)	(Italy) Parma	2014	2018	81	1
4	Kevin Bonifazi	(Italy)	CB	19 May 1996 (aged 22)	(Italy) Youth Sector	2015	2022	6	0
13	Nicolás Burdisso	(Argentina)	CB	12 April 1981 (aged 37)	Unattached	2017	2018	24	0
15	Cristian Ansaldi	(Argentina)	LB / RB	20 September 1986 (aged 31)	(Italy) Internazionale	2017	2021	25	1
23	Antonio Barreca	(Italy)	LB	18 March 1995 (aged 23)	(Italy) Youth Sector	2016	2021	37	0
24	Emiliano Moretti	(Italy)	CB	11 June 1981 (aged 37)	(Italy) Genoa	2013	2018	151	5
29	Lorenzo De Silvestri	(Italy)	RB	23 May 1988 (aged 30)	(Italy) Sampdoria	2016	2020	51	6
33	Nicolas Nkoulou	(Cameroon)	CB	27 March 1990 (aged 28)	(France) Lyon	2017	2018	37	2
87	Alessandro Buongiorno	(Italy)	CB	6 June 1999 (aged 19)	(Italy) Youth Sector	2018	2022	1	0
97	Lyanco	(Brazil)	CB	1 February 1997 (aged 21)	(Brazil) São Paulo	2017	2022	4	0
Midfielders
5	Mirko Valdifiori	(Italy)	CM / DM	21 April 1986 (aged 32)	(Italy) Napoli	2016	2019	37	0
6	Afriyie Acquah	(Ghana)	CM	5 January 1992 (aged 26)	(Italy) Parma	2015	2019	71	5
8	Daniele Baselli	(Italy)	CM / AM	12 March 1992 (aged 26)	(Italy) Atalanta	2015	2022	104	14
22	Joel Obi	(Nigeria)	CM	22 May 1991 (aged 27)	(Italy) Internazionale	2015	2019	52	6
88	Tomás Rincón	(Venezuela)	DM / CM	13 January 1988 (aged 30)	(Italy) Juventus	2017	2018	36	1
Forwards
9	Andrea Belotti	(Italy)	CF	20 December 1993 (aged 24)	(Italy) Palermo	2015	2021	102	48
10	Adem Ljajić	(Serbia)	LW / RW / SS / AM	29 September 1991 (aged 26)	(Italy) Roma	2016	2020	60	16
11	M'Baye Niang	(Senegal)	LW / RW / SS / CF	19 December 1994 (aged 23)	(Italy) Milan	2017	2021	26	4
14	Iago Falque	(Spain)	LW / RW / SS	4 January 1990 (aged 28)	(Italy) Roma	2016	2020	72	24
20	Simone Edera	(Italy)	RW	9 January 1997 (aged 21)	(Italy) Youth Sector	2016	2021	15	1
21	Álex Berenguer	(Spain)	LW	4 July 1995 (aged 22)	(Spain) Osasuna	2017	2022	21	1
Players transferred during the season
7	Davide Zappacosta	(Italy)	RB / LB	11 June 1992 (aged 26)	(Italy) Atalanta	2015	2017	56	2
16	Samuel Gustafson	(Sweden)	CM	11 January 1995 (aged 23)	(Sweden) Häcken	2016	2018	9	0
19	Manuel De Luca	(Italy)	CF	17 July 1998 (aged 19)	(Italy) Youth Sector	2017	2021	0	0
31	Lucas Boyé	(Argentina)	CF	28 February 1996 (aged 22)	(Argentina) River Plate	2016	2020	41	1
99	Umar Sadiq	(Nigeria)	CF	2 February 1997 (aged 21)	(Italy) Roma	2017	2018	3	0

== Transfers ==
=== In ===
Date	Pos.	Player	Age	Moving from	Fee	Notes	Source
27 June 2017	GK	(Italy) Salvatore Sirigu	30	(France) Paris Saint-Germain	Undisclosed		
17 July 2017	FW	(Spain) Álex Berenguer	22	(Spain) Osasuna	€5.5M	€5.5M + €1M in bonuses	
31 August 2017	DF	(Argentina) Nicolás Burdisso	36	Unattached	Free		
6 January 2018	MF	(Venezuela) Tomás Rincón	29	(Italy) Juventus	€6M	Option to buy exercised	

==== Loans in ====
Date	Pos.	Player	Age	Moving from	Fee	Notes	Source
5 August 2017	DF	(Cameroon) Nicolas Nkoulou	27	(France) Lyon	Loan	Loan with an option to buy for €7M	
11 August 2017	MF	(Venezuela) Tomás Rincón	29	(Italy) Juventus	€3M	Loan with an option to buy for €6M	
16 August 2017	FW	(Nigeria) Umar Sadiq	20	(Italy) Roma	Loan	Loan with an option to buy	
31 August 2017	DF	(Argentina) Cristian Ansaldi	30	(Italy) Internazionale	€2M	2-year loan with an obligation to buy for €2M	
31 August 2017	FW	(Senegal) M'Baye Niang	22	(Italy) Milan	Loan	Loan with an obligation to buy	
22 January 2018	FW	(Italy) Giuseppe Borello	18	(Italy) Crotone	Loan		

=== Out ===
Date	Pos.	Player	Age	Moving to	Fee	Notes	Source
30 June 2017	MF	(Greece) Panagiotis Tachtsidis	26	(Greece) Olympiacos	Undisclosed		
1 July 2017	DF	(Brazil) Leandro Castán	30	(Italy) Roma	Loan return		
1 July 2017	GK	(England) Joe Hart	30	(England) Manchester City	Loan return		
1 July 2017	FW	(Paraguay) Juan Iturbe	24	(Italy) Roma	Loan return		
1 July 2017	GK	(Italy) Daniele Padelli	31	(Italy) Internazionale	Free		
9 August 2017	MF	(Italy) Marco Benassi	22	(Italy) Fiorentina	€10M		
18 August 2017	DF	(Italy) Luca Rossettini	32	(Italy) Genoa	€2M		
31 August 2017	DF	(Italy) Davide Zappacosta	25	(England) Chelsea	€28M	€28M + €2M in bonuses	
7 September 2017	DF	(Uruguay) Gastón Silva	23	(Argentina) Independiente	€1.4M		
26 January 2018	FW	(Nigeria) Umar Sadiq	20	(Italy) Roma	Loan return		

==== Loans out ====
Date	Pos.	Player	Age	Moving to	Fee	Notes	Source
8 July 2017	GK	(Senegal) Alfred Gomis	23	(Italy) SPAL	Loan		
1 August 2017	DF	(Albania) Arlind Ajeti	23	(Italy) Crotone	Loan		
15 August 2017	MF	(Serbia) Saša Lukić	21	(Spain) Levante	Loan		
21 August 2017	MF	(Italy) Mattia Aramu	22	(Italy) Virtus Entella	Loan		
31 August 2017	DF	(Brazil) Danilo Avelar	28	(France) Amiens	Loan		
31 August 2017	FW	(Italy) Vittorio Parigini	21	(Italy) Benevento	Loan		
11 January 2018	FW	(Italy) Leonardo Candellone	20	(Italy) Südtirol	Loan		
16 January 2018	FW	(Italy) Manuel De Luca	19	(Italy) Renate	Loan		
24 January 2018	MF	(Sweden) Samuel Gustafson	23	(Italy) Perugia	Loan		
31 January 2018	FW	(Argentina) Lucas Boyé	21	(Spain) Celta Vigo	Loan	Loan with an option to buy for €12M	

== Competitions ==
=== Serie A ===
==== League table ====
Pos	Team	Pld	W	D	L	GF	GA	GD	Pts	Qualification or relegation
7	Atalanta	38	16	12	10	57	39	+18	60	Qualification to Europa League second qualifying round (Note: Since the winners of the 2017–18 Coppa Italia, Juventus, qualified for European competition based on league position, the spot awarded to the cup winners (Europa League group stage) was passed to the sixth-placed team and the spot awarded to the sixth-placed team (Europa League second qualifying round) was passed to the seventh-placed team.)
8	Fiorentina	38	16	9	13	54	46	+8	57	
9	Torino	38	13	15	10	54	46	+8	54	
10	Sampdoria	38	16	6	16	56	60	−4	54	
11	Sassuolo	38	11	10	17	29	59	−30	43	

Source: Serie A, Soccerway
Rules for classification: 1) Points; 2) Head-to-head points; 3) Head-to-head goal difference; 4) Goal difference; 5) Goals scored; 6) Draw.

==== Results summary ====
Overall								Home						Away					
Pld	W	D	L	GF	GA	GD	Pts	W	D	L	GF	GA	GD	W	D	L	GF	GA	GD
38	13	15	10	54	46	+8	54	8	6	5	29	18	+11	5	9	5	25	28	−3

Last updated: 20 May 2018.
Source: Competitive matches

==== Results by round ====
Round	1	2	3	4	5	6	7	8	9	10	11	12	13	14	15	16	17	18	19	20	21	22	23	24	25	26	27	28	29	30	31	32	33	34	35	36	37	38
Ground	A	H	A	H	A	A	H	A	H	A	H	A	H	A	H	A	H	A	H	H	A	H	A	H	H	A	H	A	H	A	H	A	H	A	H	A	H	A
Result	D	W	W	D	W	L	D	D	L	L	W	D	D	D	D	W	L	D	D	W	D	W	D	W	L	L	W	L	L	W	W	D	D	L	L	D	W	W
Position	9	6	5	6	5	8	6	8	10	12	9	8	8	12	11	9	10	10	10	10	10	9	9	9	9	9	9	10	10	10	10	10	10	10	10	10	10	9

Updated to match(es) played on 20 May 2018. Source: Competitive matches
A = Away; H = Home; W = Win; D = Draw; L = Loss

==== Matches ====
20 August 2017 1	Bologna	1–1	Torino	Bologna
20:45 CEST (UTC+02:00)	Di Francesco 27'; De Maio (yellow card) 48'; Pulgar (yellow card) 60'	Report	Ljajić 33'; Rincón (yellow card) 90+3'	Stadium: Stadio Renato Dall'Ara; Attendance: 19,033; Referee: Davide Massa

27 August 2017 2	Torino	3–0	Sassuolo	Turin
18:00 CEST (UTC+02:00)	Belotti 44'; Ljajić 84'; Obi 88', (yellow card) 90+1'	Report	Ragusa (yellow card) 80'	Stadium: Stadio Olimpico Grande Torino; Attendance: 18,289; Referee: Paolo Mazzoleni

10 September 2017 3	Benevento	0–1	Torino	Benevento
18:00 CEST (UTC+02:00)	Cataldi (yellow card) 45+1'; Memushaj (yellow card) 68'	Report	Moretti (yellow card) 32'; Rincón (yellow card) 53'; Falque 90+3'	Stadium: Stadio Ciro Vigorito; Attendance: 11,416; Referee: Rosario Abisso

17 September 2017 4	Torino	2–2	Sampdoria	Turin
15:00 CEST (UTC+02:00)	Baselli 13'; Belotti 15'; De Silvestri (yellow card) 60'; Moretti (yellow card) 90+1'	Report	Zapata 1'; Quagliarella 34'; Strinić (yellow card) 59'	Stadium: Stadio Olimpico Grande Torino; Attendance: 19,879; Referee: Paolo Tagliavento

20 September 2017 5	Udinese	2–3	Torino	Udine
20:45 CEST (UTC+02:00)	Hallfreðsson (yellow card) 32'; De Paul 48' (pen.); Lasagna 75'	Report	Baselli (yellow card) 8'; Belotti 9'; Ansaldi (yellow card) 27'; Hallfreðsson 30' (o.g.); Ljajić (yellow card) 48', (goal) 67'; Rincón (yellow card) 54'; Berenguer (yellow card) 80'	Stadium: Dacia Arena; Attendance: 14,793; Referee: Gianluca Rocchi

23 September 2017 6	Juventus	4–0	Torino	Turin
20:45 CEST (UTC+02:00)	Dybala 16', 90+1'; Pjanić 40'; Benatia (yellow card) 45+1'; Alex Sandro 57'	Report	Baselli (yellow card) 10' (yellow-red card) 24'; Ljajić (yellow card) 39'; Acquah (yellow card) 83'	Stadium: Allianz Stadium; Attendance: 40,856; Referee: Piero Giacomelli

1 October 2017 7	Torino	2–2	Hellas Verona	Turin
15:00 CEST (UTC+02:00)	Falque 31'; Niang 44'; Rincón (yellow card) 90+4'	Report	Kean (yellow card) 51', (goal) 89'; B. Zuculini (yellow card) 79' (yellow-red card) 90+7'; Pazzini 90+2' (pen.); Valoti (yellow card) 90+5'	Stadium: Stadio Olimpico Grande Torino; Attendance: 16,834; Referee: Claudio Gavillucci

15 October 2017 8	Crotone	2–2	Torino	Crotone
15:00 CEST (UTC+02:00)	Rohdén 25'; Ajeti (yellow card) 52'; Martella 64'	Report	Falque 53'; De Silvestri 90+2'	Stadium: Stadio Ezio Scida; Attendance: 9,563; Referee: Paolo Valeri

22 October 2017 9	Torino	0–1	Roma	Turin
15:00 CEST (UTC+02:00)	Niang (yellow card) 64'	Report	Kolarov 69'; Alisson (yellow card) 78'	Stadium: Stadio Olimpico Grande Torino; Attendance: 19,646; Referee: Antonio Damato

25 October 2017 10	Fiorentina	3–0	Torino	Florence
20:45 CEST (UTC+02:00)	Benassi 29'; Astori (yellow card) 41'; Simeone 66'; Babacar 75' (pen.)	Report	Baselli (yellow card) 18'; Rincón (yellow card) 61'; Barreca (red card) 73'; Moretti (yellow card) 76'	Stadium: Stadio Artemio Franchi; Attendance: 22,459; Referee: Maurizio Mariani

29 October 2017 11	Torino	2–1	Cagliari	Turin
20:45 CET (UTC+01:00)	Acquah (yellow card) 23'; Falque 40', (yellow card) 78'; Ansaldi (yellow card) 41'; Obi 66'; Sirigu (yellow card) 90+2'	Report	Barella 30'; João Pedro (yellow card) 61'; Capuano (yellow card) 70'; Miangue (yellow card) 90+3'	Stadium: Stadio Olimpico Grande Torino; Attendance: 18,309; Referee: Gianpaolo Calvarese

5 November 2017 12	Internazionale	1–1	Torino	Milan
12:30 CET (UTC+01:00)	Vecino (yellow card) 33'; Škriniar (yellow card) 66'; Éder 79'; Brozović (yellow card) 83'	Report	Burdisso (yellow card) 42'; Rincón (yellow card) 56'; Falque 59'; Sirigu (yellow card) 61'; Obi (yellow card) 64'; Acquah (yellow card) 89'	Stadium: San Siro; Attendance: 71,581; Referee: Daniele Orsato

19 November 2017 13	Torino	1–1	Chievo	Turin
15:00 CET (UTC+01:00)	Baselli 33'; Niang (yellow card) 88'	Report	Hetemaj 14'; Radovanović (red card) 88'; Inglese (yellow card) 90+2'	Stadium: Stadio Olimpico Grande Torino; Attendance: 15,523; Referee: Luca Banti

26 November 2017 14	Milan	0–0	Torino	Milan
15:00 CET (UTC+01:00)		Report	Burdisso (yellow card) 43'; Rincón (yellow card) 62'	Stadium: San Siro; Attendance: 53,923; Referee: Massimiliano Irrati

2 December 2017 15	Torino	1–1	Atalanta	Turin
20:45 CET (UTC+01:00)	Nkoulou 45'; Obi (yellow card) 49'; Baselli (yellow card) 78'	Report	Iličić 54'; Masiello (yellow card) 64'; Toloi (yellow card) 85'	Stadium: Stadio Olimpico Grande Torino; Attendance: 14,605; Referee: Paolo Tagliavento

11 December 2017 16	Lazio	1–3	Torino	Rome
21:00 CET (UTC+01:00)	Immobile (red card) 45+1'; Milinković-Savić (yellow card) 68'; Luis Alberto 69'	Report	Nkoulou (yellow card) 41'; Berenguer 54'; Rincón 64'; Edera 73'	Stadium: Stadio Olimpico; Attendance: 20,000; Referee: Piero Giacomelli

16 December 2017 17	Torino	1–3	Napoli	Turin
18:00 CET (UTC+01:00)	Baselli (yellow card) 37'; Belotti 63'	Report	Koulibaly 4'; Zieliński 25'; Hamšík 30'; Albiol (yellow card) 76'	Stadium: Stadio Olimpico Grande Torino; Attendance: 18,449; Referee: Paolo Mazzoleni

23 December 2017 18	SPAL	2–2	Torino	Ferrara
15:00 CET (UTC+01:00)	Cremonesi (yellow card) 23'; Vicari (yellow card) 38'; Viviani 42'; Schiattarella (yellow card) 45+2'; Antenucci 69' (pen.); Mora (yellow card) 90+2'	Report	Falque 1', 10'; Baselli (yellow card) 35'; Nkoulou (yellow card) 62'	Stadium: Stadio Paolo Mazza; Attendance: 12,522; Referee: Paolo Valeri

30 December 2017 19	Torino	0–0	Genoa	Turin
15:00 CET (UTC+01:00)	Valdifiori (yellow card) 47'	Report	Rosi (yellow card) 38'; Rigoni (yellow card) 67'; Spolli (yellow card) 90+2'	Stadium: Stadio Olimpico Grande Torino; Attendance: 17,039; Referee: Massimiliano Irrati

6 January 2018 20	Torino	3–0	Bologna	Turin
12:30 CET (UTC+01:00)	Burdisso (yellow card) 20'; De Silvestri 38'; Niang 53'; Falque 85'	Report	González (yellow card) 43'; Okwonkwo (yellow card) 90+1'	Stadium: Stadio Olimpico Grande Torino; Attendance: 16,042; Referee: Antonio Damato

21 January 2018 21	Sassuolo	1–1	Torino	Reggio Emilia
15:00 CET (UTC+01:00)	Duncan (yellow card) 39'; Berardi 54'; Acerbi (yellow card) 65'; Matri (yellow card) 70'; Goldaniga (yellow card) 90+2'	Report	Obi 26'; Rincón (yellow card) 48'; Baselli (yellow card) 81'	Stadium: Mapei Stadium – Città del Tricolore; Attendance: 10,402; Referee: Michael Fabbri

28 January 2018 22	Torino	3–0	Benevento	Turin
15:00 CET (UTC+01:00)	Falque 3'; Niang (yellow card) 33', (goal) 40'; Obi 45'; Molinaro (yellow card) 60'	Report	Djimsiti (yellow card) 22'; Belec (red card) 33'	Stadium: Stadio Olimpico Grande Torino; Attendance: 16,257; Referee: Maurizio Mariani

3 February 2018 23	Sampdoria	1–1	Torino	Genoa
18:00 CET (UTC+01:00)	Ramírez (yellow card) 11'; Torreira 11'; Barreto (yellow card) 23'; Viviano (yellow card) 85'	Report	Niang (yellow card) 16'; Acquah 25', (yellow card) 45+4' (yellow-red card) 73'; Baselli (yellow card) 58'	Stadium: Stadio Luigi Ferraris; Attendance: 19,035; Referee: Gianluca Rocchi

11 February 2018 24	Torino	2–0	Udinese	Turin
15:00 CET (UTC+01:00)	Nkoulou 32'; Rincón (yellow card) 58'; Belotti 66'; Burdisso (yellow card) 74'	Report	Hallfreðsson (yellow card) 87'	Stadium: Stadio Olimpico Grande Torino; Attendance: 18,740; Referee: Rosario Abisso

18 February 2018 25	Torino	0–1	Juventus	Turin
12:30 CET (UTC+01:00)	Molinaro (yellow card) 90+2'	Report	Alex Sandro 33'; De Sciglio (yellow card) 65'	Stadium: Stadio Olimpico Grande Torino; Attendance: 26,105; Referee: Daniele Orsato

25 February 2018 26	Hellas Verona	2–1	Torino	Verona
15:00 CET (UTC+01:00)	Valoti 12', 77'; Petković (yellow card) 29'; Ferrari (yellow card) 39'; Rômulo (yellow card) 44'	Report	Burdisso (yellow card) 13'; Niang 49'	Stadium: Stadio Marc'Antonio Bentegodi; Attendance: 13,724; Referee: Davide Massa

9 March 2018 28	Roma	3–0	Torino	Rome
20:45 CET (UTC+01:00)	De Rossi (yellow card) 8', (goal) 73'; Manolas 56'; Pellegrini 90+3'	Report	Ansaldi (yellow card) 36'; Baselli (yellow card) 87'	Stadium: Stadio Olimpico; Attendance: 33,847; Referee: Fabio Maresca

18 March 2018 29	Torino	1–2	Fiorentina	Turin
15:00 CET (UTC+01:00)	De Silvestri (yellow card) 13'; Falque (yellow card) 23'; Niang (yellow card) 71'; Belotti 86'	Report	Veretout 59'; Biraghi (yellow card) 76'; Pezzella (yellow card) 85'; Benassi (yellow card) 90'; Théréau 90+4' (pen.)	Stadium: Stadio Olimpico Grande Torino; Attendance: 16,401; Referee: Claudio Gavillucci

31 March 2018 30	Cagliari	0–4	Torino	Cagliari
15:00 CEST (UTC+02:00)		Report	Falque 61'; Ljajić 65'; Ansaldi (yellow card) 70', (goal) 79'; Obi 88'	Stadium: Sardegna Arena; Attendance: 15,959; Referee: Federico La Penna

4 April 2018 27	Torino	4–1	Crotone	Turin
18:30 CEST (UTC+02:00)	Belotti 16', 36', 68'; Falque 20'; Rincón (yellow card) 66'	Report	Faraoni (yellow card) 36', (goal) 90'	Stadium: Stadio Olimpico Grande Torino; Attendance: 15,760; Referee: Marco Guida
Note: Postponed due to Fiorentina player Davide Astori's death; originally scheduled for 4 March 2018.

8 April 2018 31	Torino	1–0	Internazionale	Turin
12:30 CEST (UTC+02:00)	Belotti (yellow card) 21'; Ljajić 36'; Baselli (yellow card) 60'	Report	Miranda (yellow card) 7'; Brozović (yellow card) 39'; Gagliardini (yellow card) 45+2'	Stadium: Stadio Olimpico Grande Torino; Attendance: 25,507; Referee: Paolo Tagliavento

14 April 2018 32	Chievo	0–0	Torino	Verona
18:00 CEST (UTC+02:00)	Bani (yellow card) 31' (red card) 88'; Inglese (yellow card) 90+2'	Report		Stadium: Stadio Marc'Antonio Bentegodi; Attendance: 9,000; Referee: Marco Di Bello

18 April 2018 33	Torino	1–1	Milan	Turin
20:45 CEST (UTC+02:00)	De Silvestri (yellow card) 25' (yellow-red card) 90+3', (goal) 70'; Rincón (yellow card) 42'; Baselli (yellow card) 71'	Report	Bonaventura 9', (yellow card) 45'; Cutrone (yellow card) 79'; Locatelli (yellow card) 88'	Stadium: Stadio Olimpico Grande Torino; Attendance: 24,264; Referee: Fabio Maresca

22 April 2018 34	Atalanta	2–1	Torino	Bergamo
15:00 CEST (UTC+02:00)	Caldara (yellow card) 50'; Freuler 53'; De Roon (yellow card) 55'; Gosens 64'	Report	Ljajić 56'; Ansaldi (yellow card) 83'; Moretti (yellow card) 90+2'	Stadium: Stadio Atleti Azzurri d'Italia; Attendance: 18,856; Referee: Gianluca Aureliano

29 April 2018 35	Torino	0–1	Lazio	Turin
20:45 CEST (UTC+02:00)	Moretti (yellow card) 49'; Baselli (yellow card) 54'	Report	Milinković-Savić (yellow card) 43', (goal) 56'; Marušić (yellow card) 76'; Strakosha (yellow card) 82'	Stadium: Stadio Olimpico Grande Torino; Attendance: 17,060; Referee: Massimiliano Irrati

6 May 2018 36	Napoli	2–2	Torino	Naples
15:00 CEST (UTC+02:00)	Mertens 25'; Mário Rui (yellow card) 65'; Hamšík 71'	Report	Burdisso (yellow card) 21'; Baselli (yellow card) 52', (goal) 55'; Belotti (yellow card) 74'; De Silvestri 83'; Nkoulou (yellow card) 90'	Stadium: Stadio San Paolo; Attendance: 47,057; Referee: Daniele Doveri

13 May 2018 37	Torino	2–1	SPAL	Turin
15:00 CEST (UTC+02:00)	Rincón (yellow card) 60'; Belotti 68'; Moretti (yellow card) 83'; De Silvestri 87'	Report	Grassi 22'; Schiavon (yellow card) 27'; Everton Luiz (yellow card) 66'; Cionek (yellow card) 68'; Kurtić (yellow card) 78'; Salamon (yellow card) 90+4'	Stadium: Stadio Olimpico Grande Torino; Attendance: 18,622; Referee: Maurizio Mariani

19 May 2018 38	Genoa	1–2	Torino	Genoa
20:45 CEST (UTC+02:00)	Oméonga (yellow card) 69'; Pandev 80'	Report	Nkoulou (yellow card) 21'; Falque 30'; Ansaldi (yellow card) 45+2' (yellow-red card) 83'; Baselli 58'	Stadium: Stadio Luigi Ferraris; Attendance: 21,034; Referee: Lorenzo Illuzzi

=== Coppa Italia ===
11 August 2017 Third round	Torino	7–1	Trapani	Turin
21:15 CEST (UTC+02:00)	Belotti 13', 40'; Fazio 27' (o.g.); Berenguer 35'; Obi 43'; Falque 68'; De Silvestri 87'	Report	Fazio 18', (yellow card) 24'	Stadium: Stadio Olimpico Grande Torino; Attendance: 10,525; Referee: Fabrizio Pasqua

29 November 2017 Fourth round	Torino	2–0	Carpi	Turin
21:00 CET (UTC+01:00)	Falque 18'; Belotti 32'; Molinaro (yellow card) 66'	Report	Sabbione (yellow card) 90+2'	Stadium: Stadio Olimpico Grande Torino; Attendance: 3,931; Referee: Lorenzo Illuzzi

20 December 2017 Round of 16	Roma	1–2	Torino	Rome
17:30 CET (UTC+01:00)	Gonalons (yellow card) 57'; Schick 85'	Report	Niang (yellow card) 28'; De Silvestri 39'; Edera 73'; Moretti (yellow card) 77'	Stadium: Stadio Olimpico; Attendance: 27,206; Referee: Gianpaolo Calvarese

3 January 2018 Quarter-finals	Juventus	2–0	Torino	Turin
20:45 CET (UTC+01:00)	Douglas Costa 15'; Mandžukić 67'; Rugani (yellow card) 89'	Report	Burdisso (yellow card) 70'	Stadium: Allianz Stadium; Attendance: 37,763; Referee: Daniele Doveri

== Statistics ==
=== Appearances and goals ===
No.	Pos	Nat	Player	Total		Serie A		Coppa Italia	
No.	Pos	Nat	Player	Apps	Goals	Apps	Goals	Apps	Goals
Goalkeepers
1	GK	(Uruguay) URU	Salvador Ichazo	0	0	0	0	0	0
32	GK	(Serbia) SRB	Vanja Milinković-Savić	4	0	1	0	3	0
39	GK	(Italy) ITA	Salvatore Sirigu	38	0	37	0	1	0
Defenders
3	DF	(Italy) ITA	Cristian Molinaro	24	0	17+3	0	4	0
4	DF	(Italy) ITA	Kevin Bonifazi	7	0	4+2	0	1	0
13	DF	(Argentina) ARG	Nicolás Burdisso	25	0	23+1	0	1	0
15	DF	(Argentina) ARG	Cristian Ansaldi	25	1	20+5	1	0	0
23	DF	(Italy) ITA	Antonio Barreca	9	0	3+6	0	0	0
24	DF	(Italy) ITA	Emiliano Moretti	24	0	19+3	0	2	0
29	DF	(Italy) ITA	Lorenzo De Silvestri	39	7	35	5	3+1	2
33	DF	(Cameroon) CMR	Nicolas Nkoulou	39	2	37	2	2	0
87	DF	(Italy) ITA	Alessandro Buongiorno	1	0	0+1	0	0	0
97	DF	(Brazil) BRA	Lyanco	6	0	4	0	2	0
Midfielders
5	MF	(Italy) ITA	Mirko Valdifiori	15	0	7+6	0	2	0
6	MF	(Ghana) GHA	Afriyie Acquah	26	1	9+13	1	4	0
8	MF	(Italy) ITA	Daniele Baselli	34	4	30+2	4	2	0
22	MF	(Nigeria) NGA	Joel Obi	25	6	16+6	5	2+1	1
88	MF	(Venezuela) VEN	Tomás Rincón	38	1	35+1	1	1+1	0
Forwards
9	FW	(Italy) ITA	Andrea Belotti	35	13	29+3	10	3	3
10	FW	(Serbia) SRB	Adem Ljajić	28	6	23+4	6	1	0
11	FW	(Senegal) SEN	M'Baye Niang	29	4	18+8	4	3	0
14	FW	(Spain) ESP	Iago Falque	40	14	34+3	12	3	2
20	FW	(Italy) ITA	Simone Edera	17	2	2+12	1	1+2	1
21	FW	(Spain) ESP	Álex Berenguer	25	2	11+11	1	2+1	1
Players transferred out during the season
7	DF	(Italy) ITA	Davide Zappacosta	3	0	1+1	0	1	0
16	MF	(Sweden) SWE	Samuel Gustafson	5	0	0+4	0	0+1	0
19	FW	(Italy) ITA	Manuel De Luca	1	0	0	0	0+1	0
25	MF	(Serbia) SRB	Saša Lukić	1	0	0	0	0+1	0
31	FW	(Argentina) ARG	Lucas Boyé	14	0	0+11	0	0+3	0
99	FW	(Nigeria) NGA	Umar Sadiq	3	0	3	0	0	0

Last updated: 20 May 2018
Source: Competitions

=== Goalscorers ===
Rank	No.	Pos	Nat	Name	Serie A	Coppa Italia	Total
1	14	FW	(Spain)	Iago Falque	12	2	14
2	9	FW	(Italy)	Andrea Belotti	10	3	13
3	29	DF	(Italy)	Lorenzo De Silvestri	5	2	7
4	10	FW	(Serbia)	Adem Ljajić	6	0	6
4	22	MF	(Nigeria)	Joel Obi	5	1	6
6	8	MF	(Italy)	Daniele Baselli	4	0	4
6	11	FW	(Senegal)	M'Baye Niang	4	0	4
8	20	FW	(Italy)	Simone Edera	1	1	2
8	21	FW	(Spain)	Álex Berenguer	1	1	2
8	33	DF	(Cameroon)	Nicolas Nkoulou	2	0	2
11	6	MF	(Ghana)	Afriyie Acquah	1	0	1
11	15	DF	(Argentina)	Cristian Ansaldi	1	0	1
11	88	MF	(Venezuela)	Tomás Rincón	1	0	1
Own goal					1	1	2
Totals					54	11	65

Last updated: 20 May 2018

=== Clean sheets ===
Rank	No.	Pos	Nat	Name	Serie A	Coppa Italia	Total
1	39	GK	(Italy)	Salvatore Sirigu	10	0	10
2	32	GK	(Serbia)	Vanja Milinković-Savić	0	1	1
Totals					10	1	11

Last updated: 20 May 2018

=== Disciplinary record ===
No.	Pos	Nat	Name	Serie A			Coppa Italia			Total		
No.	Pos	Nat	Name	Booked	(yellow card) (yellow-red card)	Sent off (straight red)	Booked	(yellow card) (yellow-red card)	Sent off (straight red)	Booked	(yellow card) (yellow-red card)	Sent off (straight red)
1	GK	(Uruguay)	Salvador Ichazo	0	0	0	0	0	0	0	0	0
32	GK	(Serbia)	Vanja Milinković-Savić	0	0	0	0	0	0	0	0	0
39	GK	(Italy)	Salvatore Sirigu	2	0	0	0	0	0	2	0	0
3	DF	(Italy)	Cristian Molinaro	2	0	0	1	0	0	3	0	0
4	DF	(Italy)	Kevin Bonifazi	0	0	0	0	0	0	0	0	0
13	DF	(Argentina)	Nicolás Burdisso	6	0	0	1	0	0	7	0	0
15	DF	(Argentina)	Cristian Ansaldi	5	1	0	0	0	0	5	1	0
23	DF	(Italy)	Antonio Barreca	0	0	1	0	0	0	0	0	1
24	DF	(Italy)	Emiliano Moretti	6	0	0	1	0	0	7	0	0
29	DF	(Italy)	Lorenzo De Silvestri	2	1	0	0	0	0	2	1	0
33	DF	(Cameroon)	Nicolas Nkoulou	4	0	0	0	0	0	4	0	0
97	DF	(Brazil)	Lyanco	0	0	0	0	0	0	0	0	0
5	MF	(Italy)	Mirko Valdifiori	1	0	0	0	0	0	1	0	0
6	MF	(Ghana)	Afriyie Acquah	3	1	0	0	0	0	3	1	0
8	MF	(Italy)	Daniele Baselli	12	1	0	0	0	0	12	1	0
16	MF	(Sweden)	Samuel Gustafson	0	0	0	0	0	0	0	0	0
22	MF	(Nigeria)	Joel Obi	3	0	0	0	0	0	3	0	0
88	MF	(Venezuela)	Tomás Rincón	12	0	0	0	0	0	12	0	0
9	FW	(Italy)	Andrea Belotti	2	0	0	0	0	0	2	0	0
10	FW	(Serbia)	Adem Ljajić	2	0	0	0	0	0	2	0	0
11	FW	(Senegal)	M'Baye Niang	5	0	0	1	0	0	6	0	0
14	FW	(Spain)	Iago Falque	2	0	0	0	0	0	2	0	0
19	FW	(Italy)	Manuel De Luca	0	0	0	0	0	0	0	0	0
20	FW	(Italy)	Simone Edera	0	0	0	0	0	0	0	0	0
21	FW	(Spain)	Álex Berenguer	1	0	0	0	0	0	1	0	0
31	FW	(Argentina)	Lucas Boyé	0	0	0	0	0	0	0	0	0
99	FW	(Nigeria)	Umar Sadiq	0	0	0	0	0	0	0	0	0
Totals				70	4	1	4	0	0	74	4	1

Last updated: 20 May 2018
