= 2015–16 Torino FC season =

Torino
2015–16 season
- President: Urbano Cairo
- Manager: Giampiero Ventura
- Stadium: Stadio Olimpico Grande Torino
- Serie A: 12th
- Coppa Italia: Round of 16
- Top goalscorer: League: Andrea Belotti (12); All: Andrea Belotti (12)
- Highest home attendance: 25,868 vs Internazionale (8 November 2015, Serie A)
- Lowest home attendance: 4,962 vs Cesena (1 December 2016, Coppa Italia)
- Average home league attendance: 19,392
Home colours	Away colours	Third colours

The 2015–16 season was Torino Football Club's 105th season of competitive football, 88th season in the top division of Italian football and 71st season in Serie A. The club finished in 12th place in Serie A, and were eliminated in the round of 16 in the Coppa Italia.

== Players ==
=== Squad information ===
As of 12 February 2016

Note: Flags indicate national team as defined under FIFA eligibility rules; some limited exceptions apply. Players may hold more than one non-FIFA nationality.

No.	Pos.	Nation	Player
1	GK	ITA	Daniele Padelli
3	DF	ITA	Cristian Molinaro
4	MF	NGA	Joel Obi
5	DF	ITA	Cesare Bovo
6	MF	GHA	Afriyie Acquah
7	DF	ITA	Davide Zappacosta
8	MF	SWE	Alexander Farnerud
9	FW	ITA	Andrea Belotti
10	FW	ITA	Ciro Immobile (on loan from Sevilla)
11	FW	ARG	Maxi López
13	GK	ITA	Luca Castellazzi
14	MF	ITA	Alessandro Gazzi
15	MF	ITA	Marco Benassi

No.	Pos.	Nation	Player
16	MF	ITA	Daniele Baselli
17	FW	VEN	Josef Martínez
18	DF	SWE	Pontus Jansson
19	DF	SRB	Nikola Maksimović
20	MF	ITA	Giuseppe Vives (vice-captain)
21	DF	URU	Gastón Silva
24	DF	ITA	Emiliano Moretti
25	DF	POL	Kamil Glik (captain)
26	DF	BRA	Danilo Avelar
28	GK	URU	Salvador Ichazo
33	DF	BRA	Bruno Peres
96	DF	ITA	Valerio Mantovani

== Transfers ==
=== Summer 2015 ===
==== In ====
First Team
Position	Player	From club	Transfer fee
GK	Vlada Avramov	Atalanta	end of loan
GK	Alfred Gomis	Crotone	end of loan
GK	Lys Gomis	Trapani	end of loan
GK	Salvador Ichazo	Danubio	outright €1,200,000
DF	Danilo Avelar	Cagliari	outright €2,500,000
DF	Marko Vešović	Rijeka	end of loan
DF	Davide Zappacosta	Atalanta	outright €5,500,000
MF	Afriyie Acquah	1899 Hoffenheim	outright €2,800,000
MF	Daniele Baselli	Atalanta	outright €4,500,000
MF	Marco Benassi	Internazionale	co-ownership resolved €3,500,000
MF	Joel Obi	Internazionale	outright €2,300,000
MF	Alen Stevanović	Spezia	end of loan
MF	Sergiu Suciu	Crotone	end of loan
FW	Andrea Belotti	Palermo	outright €7,500,000
FW	Marcelo Larrondo	Tigre	end of loan

Reserves and youth
Position	Player	From club	Transfer fee
DF	Marco Chiosa	Bari	end of loan
FW	Vittorio Parigini	Juve Stabia	end of loan

==== Out ====
First Team
Position	Player	From club	Transfer fee
GK	Vlada Avramov		end of contract
GK	Alfred Gomis	Cesena	loan
GK	Lys Gomis	Frosinone	loan
DF	Matteo Darmian	Manchester United	outright €18,000,000
DF	Salvatore Masiello		end of contract
DF	Marko Vešović	Spezia	outright €300,000
MF	Migjen Basha		end of contract
MF	Álvaro González	Lazio	end of loan
MF	Omar El Kaddouri	Spezia	end of loan
MF	Alen Stevanović		end of contract
MF	Sergiu Suciu	Crotone	end of loan
FW	Paulo Vitor Barreto		end of contract
FW	Marcelo Larrondo	Rosario Central	outright €500,000

Reserves and youth
Position	Player	From club	Transfer fee
DF	Antonio Barreca	Cagliari	loan
DF	Kevin Bonifazi	Benevento	loan
DF	Marco Chiosa	Avellino	loan
DF	Matteo Fissore	Fidelis Andria	loan
DF	Filippo Scaglia	Cittadella	loan
MF	Mattia Aramu	Livorno	loan
MF	Giovanni Graziano	Renate	loan
FW	Facundo Lescano	Melfi	loan
FW	Claudio Morra	Fidelis Andria	loan

=== Winter 2015–16 ===
==== In ====
First Team
Position	Player	From club	Transfer fee
MF	Juan Sánchez Miño	Estudiantes	end of loan
MF	Sergiu Suciu	Lecce	end of loan
FW	Ciro Immobile	Borussia Dortmund	on loan / buying option

Reserves and youth
Position	Player	From club	Transfer fee
DF	Kevin Bonifazi	Benevento	end of loan
FW	Facundo Lescano	Melfi	end of loan
FW	Boubacar Traorè	Tuttocuoio	on loan / buying option

==== Out ====
First Team
Position	Player	From club	Transfer fee
DF	Vasyl Pryima	Frosinone	loan
MF	Juan Sánchez Miño	Cruzerio	loan
MF	Sanjin Prcić	Perugia	loan
MF	Sergiu Suciu	Cremonese	loan
FW	Fabio Quagliarella	Sampdoria	outright €3,000,000

Reserves and youth
Position	Player	From club	Transfer fee
DF	Kevin Bonifazi	Casertana	loan
FW	Elia Bortoluz	Vicenza	loan
FW	Facundo Lescano	Monopoli	loan
FW	Claudio Morra	Savona	loan

== Competitions ==
=== Serie A ===
==== League table ====
Pos	Team	Pld	W	D	L	GF	GA	GD	Pts
10	Empoli	38	12	10	16	40	49	−9	46 (Note: Empoli ahead of Genoa on head-to-head goal difference; Empoli +1, Genoa –1.)
11	Genoa	38	13	7	18	45	48	−3	46
12	Torino	38	12	9	17	52	55	−3	45 (Note: Torino ahead of Atalanta on head-to-head points; Torino 6 points, Atalanta 0 points.)
13	Atalanta	38	11	12	15	41	47	−6	45
14	Bologna	38	11	9	18	33	45	−12	42

Source: Serie A, Soccerway
Rules for classification: 1) Points; 2) Head-to-head points; 3) Head-to-head goal difference; 4) Goal difference; 5) Goals scored; 6) Draw.

==== Results summary ====
Overall								Home						Away					
Pld	W	D	L	GF	GA	GD	Pts	W	D	L	GF	GA	GD	W	D	L	GF	GA	GD
38	12	9	17	52	54	−2	45	6	6	7	25	25	0	6	3	10	27	29	−2

Last updated: 15 May 2016.
Source: Competitive matches

==== Results by round ====
Round	1	2	3	4	5	6	7	8	9	10	11	12	13	14	15	16	17	18	19	20	21	22	23	24	25	26	27	28	29	30	31	32	33	34	35	36	37	38
Ground	A	H	A	H	A	H	A	H	A	H	A	H	A	H	H	A	H	A	H	H	A	H	A	H	A	H	A	H	A	H	A	H	A	A	H	A	H	A
Result	W	W	D	W	L	W	L	D	L	D	L	L	W	W	D	D	L	L	L	W	L	D	D	L	W	D	L	D	L	L	W	W	W	L	L	W	L	L
Position	6	2	4	2	6	3	5	7	8	10	11	9	9	8	9	11	12	14	14	11	11	11	11	12	11	11	12	12	13	13	11	11	11	11	12	10	11	12

Updated to match(es) played on 15 May 2016. Source: Competitive matches
A = Away; H = Home; W = Win; D = Draw; L = Loss

==== Matches ====
23 August 2015 1	Frosinone	1–2	Torino	Frosinone
20:45 CEST (UTC+02:00)	Soddimo 7'; Dionisi (yellow card) 89'; Ciofani (yellow card) 90+5'	Report	Peres (yellow card) 45+1'; Quagliarella 59'; Baselli 64'; Maksimović (yellow card) 74'	Stadium: Stadio Matusa; Attendance: 8,300; Referee: Luca Banti

30 August 2015 2	Torino	3–1	Fiorentina	Turin
20:45 CEST (UTC+02:00)	Vives (yellow card) 44'; Maxi López (yellow card) 64'; Moretti 68'; Quagliarella 69'; Baselli 77'	Report	Alonso 10', (yellow card) 10'; Gonzalo (yellow card) 30'; Fernández (yellow card) 34'	Stadium: Stadio Olimpico di Torino; Attendance: 20,482; Referee: Paolo Tagliavento

13 September 2015 3	Hellas Verona	2–2	Torino	Verona
12:30 CEST (UTC+02:00)	Toni 49' (pen.), (yellow card) 90+2'; Pisano (yellow card) 62'; Janković (yellow card) 65'; Juanito 72'; Márquez (yellow card) 81'; Greco (yellow card) 90+3'	Report	Avelar (yellow card) 11'; Baselli 66', (yellow card) 90+2'; Acquah 73'	Stadium: Stadio Marc'Antonio Bentegodi; Attendance: 17,868; Referee: Massimiliano Irrati

20 September 2015 4	Torino	2–0	Sampdoria	Turin
15:00 CEST (UTC+02:00)	Quagliarella 18', 24'; Acquah (yellow card) 45+1'; Vives (yellow card) 63'	Report	Regini (yellow card) 39'; Fernando (yellow card) 79'; Christodoulopoulos (yellow card) 84'	Stadium: Stadio Olimpico di Torino; Attendance: 18,686; Referee: Piero Giacomelli

23 September 2015 5	Chievo	1–0	Torino	Verona
20:45 CEST (UTC+02:00)	Pinzi (yellow card) 16'; Castro 75', (yellow card) 82'; Gobbi (yellow card) 85'	Report	Peres (yellow card) 15'; Acquah (yellow card) 72'; Bovo (yellow card) 88'	Stadium: Stadio Marc'Antonio Bentegodi; Attendance: 9,000; Referee: Domenico Celi

27 September 2015 6	Torino	2–1	Palermo	Turin
15:00 CEST (UTC+02:00)	Bovo (yellow card) 34'; Molinaro (yellow card) 37' (yellow-red card) 61'; González 44' (o.g.); Benassi 48'; Padelli (yellow card) 77'; Obi (red card) 90'	Report	Rispoli (yellow card) 31'; Vázquez (yellow card) 42'; Struna (yellow card) 66'; González 71'; Quaison (yellow card) 88'; El Kaoutari (yellow card) 90'	Stadium: Stadio Olimpico di Torino; Attendance: 17,640; Referee: Maurizio Mariani

3 October 2015 7	Carpi	2–1	Torino	Modena
18:00 CEST (UTC+02:00)	Padelli 55' (o.g.); Martinho (yellow card) 64'; Matos 72'; Lazzari (yellow card) 89'	Report	Maxi López 75' (pen.); Silva (yellow card) 76'	Stadium: Stadio Alberto Braglia; Attendance: 8,011; Referee: Carmine Russo

17 October 2015 8	Torino	1–1	Milan	Turin
20:45 CEST (UTC+02:00)	Baselli (yellow card) 20', (goal) 73'; Gazzi (yellow card) 41'; Bovo (yellow card) 75'	Report	Kucka (yellow card) 13'; Bonaventura (yellow card) 52'; Bacca 63'; Romagnoli (yellow card) 79'; López (yellow card) 88'	Stadium: Stadio Olimpico di Torino; Attendance: 25,477; Referee: Andrea Gervasoni

25 October 2015 9	Lazio	3–0	Torino	Rome
18:00 CET (UTC+01:00)	Maurício (yellow card) 30'; Lulić 40'; Klose (yellow card) 60'; Anderson 70', 90+4'	Report	Moretti (yellow card) 33'; Vives (yellow card) 39'; Benassi (yellow card) 78'	Stadium: Stadio Olimpico; Attendance: 22,131; Referee: Paolo Mazzoleni

28 October 2015 10	Torino	3–3	Genoa	Turin
20:45 CET (UTC+01:00)	Maxi López 28'; Zappacosta 35'; Benassi (yellow card) 54'; Bovo (yellow card) 69'; Tachtsidis 89' (o.g.)	Report	Laxalt 26', 90+4'; Pavoletti 67'; Muñoz (yellow card) 82'	Stadium: Stadio Olimpico di Torino; Attendance: 16,226; Referee: Daniele Chiffi

31 October 2015 11	Juventus	2–1	Torino	Turin
18:00 CET (UTC+01:00)	Pogba 19', (yellow card) 81'; Morata (yellow card) 27'; Cuadrado 90+3'	Report	Acquah (yellow card) 21'; Bovo (yellow card) 21', (goal) 51'; Zappacosta (yellow card) 76'; Peres (yellow card) 90'	Stadium: Juventus Stadium; Attendance: 39,828; Referee: Gianluca Rocchi

8 November 2015 12	Torino	0–1	Internazionale	Turin
12:30 CET (UTC+01:00)	Glik (yellow card) 31'; Peres (yellow card) 74'	Report	Kondogbia 31'; Medel (yellow card) 63'	Stadium: Stadio Olimpico di Torino; Attendance: 25,868; Referee: Massimiliano Irrati

22 November 2015 13	Atalanta	0–1	Torino	Bergamo
15:00 CET (UTC+01:00)	De Roon (yellow card) 36'; Stendardo (yellow card) 64'	Report	Vives (yellow card) 16'; Bovo 52'	Stadium: Stadio Atleti Azzurri d'Italia; Attendance: 15,776; Referee: Angelo Cervellera

28 November 2015 14	Torino	2–0	Bologna	Turin
18:00 CET (UTC+01:00)	Belotti 75'; Vives 90+2'	Report	Maietta (yellow card) 64'	Stadium: Stadio Olimpico di Torino; Attendance: 17,508; Referee: Davide Ghersini

5 December 2015 15	Torino	1–1	Roma	Turin
15:00 CET (UTC+01:00)	Peres (yellow card) 28'; Acquah (yellow card) 36'; Glik (yellow card) 74'; Maxi López 90+4' (pen.)	Report	Pjanić (yellow card) 16', (goal) 83'; Florenzi (yellow card) 36'; Nainggolan (yellow card) 56'; Manolas (yellow card) 90+4'	Stadium: Stadio Olimpico di Torino; Attendance: 19,781; Referee: Antonio Damato

20 December 2015 17	Torino	0–1	Udinese	Turin
15:00 CET (UTC+01:00)	Bovo (yellow card) 63'; Maxi López (yellow card) 73'	Report	Danilo (yellow card) 12'; Perica 41'; Wagué (yellow card) 53' (yellow-red card) 64'	Stadium: Stadio Olimpico di Torino; Attendance: 15,624; Referee: Claudio Gavillucci

6 January 2016 18	Napoli	2–1	Torino	Naples
20:45 CET (UTC+01:00)	Higuaín (yellow card) 6'; Insigne 16'; Hamšík 41'; Albiol (yellow card) 86'	Report	Acquah (yellow card) 2'; Quagliarella 33' (pen.); Baselli (yellow card) 47'; Glik (yellow card) 59'; Bovo (yellow card) 72'	Stadium: Stadio San Paolo; Attendance: 33,326; Referee: Marco Di Bello

10 January 2016 19	Torino	0–1	Empoli	Turin
15:00 CET (UTC+01:00)	Molinaro (yellow card) 20'; Belotti (yellow card) 35'; Zappacosta (yellow card) 90'	Report	Büchel (yellow card) 26'; Livaja (yellow card) 32'; Maccarone (yellow card) 45+2', (goal) 56'; Barba (yellow card) 62'; Paredes (yellow card) 66'; Laurini (yellow card) 90+3'	Stadium: Stadio Olimpico di Torino; Attendance: 14,730; Referee: Andrea Gervasoni

16 January 2016 20	Torino	4–2	Frosinone	Turin
18:00 CET (UTC+01:00)	Immobile 9' (pen.); Belotti 37', 41'; Molinaro (yellow card) 60'; Benassi 82'	Report	Bertoncini (yellow card) 7'; Sammarco 33'; Avelar 73' (o.g.)	Stadium: Stadio Olimpico di Torino; Attendance: 17,865; Referee: Massimiliano Irrati

20 January 2016 16	Sassuolo	1–1	Torino	Reggio Emilia
20:45 CET (UTC+01:00)	Acerbi 40'; Vrsaljko (yellow card) 83'; Magnanelli (yellow card) 86'	Report	Belotti 22'; Benassi (yellow card) 58'; Glik (yellow card) 70'; Maksimović (yellow card) 78'; Acquah (yellow card) 90+2'	Stadium: Mapei Stadium – Città del Tricolore; Attendance: 7,000; Referee: Domenico Celi
Note: Postponed to 20 January 2016 due to heavy fog.

24 January 2016 21	Fiorentina	2–0	Torino	Florence
12:30 CET (UTC+01:00)	Iličić 24'; Roncaglia (yellow card) 75'; Gonzalo 83'	Report	Zappacosta (yellow card) 56'; Glik (yellow card) 60'; Vives (yellow card) 61'; Maksimović (yellow card) 79'	Stadium: Stadio Artemio Franchi; Attendance: 26,392; Referee: Paolo Mazzoleni

31 January 2016 22	Torino	0–0	Hellas Verona	Turin
15:00 CET (UTC+01:00)		Report	Janković (yellow card) 44'; Greco (yellow card) 58'; Helander (yellow card) 62'; Pazzini (yellow card) 90+3'	Stadium: Stadio Olimpico di Torino; Attendance: 15,838; Referee: Maurizio Mariani

3 February 2016 23	Sampdoria	2–2	Torino	Genoa
20:45 CET (UTC+01:00)	Correa (yellow card) 45+1'; Diakité (yellow card) 45+2'; Muriel 66'; Ranocchia (yellow card) 77'; Soriano 84'	Report	Gazzi (yellow card) 31'; Glik (yellow card) 48'; Belotti 71', 90+4'; Baselli (yellow card) 90+1'	Stadium: Stadio Luigi Ferraris; Attendance: 20,223; Referee: Marco Guida

7 February 2016 24	Torino	1–2	Chievo	Turin
15:00 CET (UTC+01:00)	Benassi 19', (yellow card) 45'; Immobile (yellow card) 25'; Gazzi (yellow card) 87'	Report	Gobbi (yellow card) 11'; Dainelli (yellow card) 27'; Peres 34' (o.g.); Birsa 72' (pen.); Floro Flores (yellow card) 90+2'	Stadium: Stadio Olimpico di Torino; Attendance: 14,327; Referee: Gianluca Rocchi

14 February 2016 25	Palermo	1–3	Torino	Palermo
15:00 CET (UTC+01:00)	Gilardino 2'	Report	Immobile 19' (pen.), 69'; González 31' (o.g.); Vives (yellow card) 40'; Glik (yellow card) 43'	Stadium: Stadio Renzo Barbera; Attendance: 13,820; Referee: Angelo Cervellera

21 February 2016 26	Torino	0–0	Carpi	Turin
15:00 CET (UTC+01:00)	Glik (yellow card) 25'; Benassi (yellow card) 26'; Peres (yellow card) 30'; Immobile (yellow card) 82'	Report	Crimi (yellow card) 21'; Lollo (yellow card) 38'; Zaccardo (yellow card) 55'; Sabelli (yellow card) 74'	Stadium: Stadio Olimpico di Torino; Attendance: 22,891; Referee: Claudio Gavillucci

27 February 2016 27	Milan	1–0	Torino	Milan
20:45 CET (UTC+01:00)	Antonelli 45'; Abate (yellow card) 69'; Boateng (yellow card) 80'	Report	Glik (yellow card) 43'	Stadium: San Siro; Attendance: 33,748; Referee: Domenico Celi

6 March 2016 28	Torino	1–1	Lazio	Turin
12:30 CET (UTC+01:00)	Belotti 12'; Vives (yellow card) 23'; Peres (yellow card) 49'; Acquah (yellow card) 57'	Report	Konko (yellow card) 51'; Parolo (yellow card) 70'; Biglia 78' (pen.)	Stadium: Stadio Olimpico di Torino; Attendance: 18,863; Referee: Davide Massa

13 March 2016 29	Genoa	3–2	Torino	Genoa
15:00 CET (UTC+01:00)	Cerci 20' (pen.), 45+2' (pen.); Rigoni 66'; Tachtsidis (yellow card) 90'	Report	Immobile 4', 15'; Padelli (yellow card) 45+2'; Benassi (yellow card) 49'; Moretti (yellow card) 67'; Vives (yellow card) 73'; Acquah (yellow card) 85'	Stadium: Stadio Luigi Ferraris; Attendance: 20,225; Referee: Daniele Doveri

20 March 2016 30	Torino	1–4	Juventus	Turin
15:00 CET (UTC+01:00)	Acquah (yellow card) 19'; Glik (yellow card) 31'; Silva (yellow card) 36'; Belotti 48' (pen.), (yellow card) 68'	Report	Alex Sandro (yellow card) 17'; Pogba 33'; Khedira 42', (red card) 87'; Lichtsteiner (yellow card) 44'; Bonucci (yellow card) 47'; Morata 63', 76'	Stadium: Stadio Olimpico di Torino; Attendance: 24,428; Referee: Nicola Rizzoli

3 April 2016 31	Internazionale	1–2	Torino	Milan
20:45 CEST (UTC+02:00)	Icardi 17' (pen.); Miranda (yellow card) 19' (yellow-red card) 57'; Medel (yellow card) 42'; Nagatomo (red card) 72'	Report	Moretti (yellow card) 17'; Vives (yellow card) 29'; Molinaro 55', (yellow card) 88'; Belotti 73' (pen.), (yellow card) 90'; Peres (yellow card) 82'	Stadium: San Siro; Attendance: 39,125; Referee: Marco Guida

10 April 2016 32	Torino	2–1	Atalanta	Turin
15:00 CEST (UTC+02:00)	Peres 35', (yellow card) 82'; Maxi López 46'; Baselli (yellow card) 77'	Report	Stendardo (yellow card) 24'; De Roon (yellow card) 42' (yellow-red card) 90+1'; Cigarini (yellow card) 74', (goal) 82'; Masiello (yellow card) 75'	Stadium: Stadio Olimpico di Torino; Attendance: 19,369; Referee: Marco Di Bello

16 April 2016 33	Bologna	0–1	Torino	Bologna
15:00 CEST (UTC+02:00)	Rossettini (yellow card) 13'; Brienza (yellow card) 28'; Masina (yellow card) 82'; Mirante (yellow card) 90+4'	Report	Bovo (yellow card) 41'; Belotti 90+3' (pen.)	Stadium: Stadio Renato Dall'Ara; Attendance: 20,655; Referee: Rosario Abisso

20 April 2016 34	Roma	3–2	Torino	Rome
20:45 CEST (UTC+02:00)	Florenzi (yellow card) 39'; Manolas 65'; Totti 86', 89' (pen.)	Report	Belotti 35' (pen.), (yellow card) 42'; Martínez 80'; Padelli (yellow card) 84'; Glik (yellow card) 89'	Stadium: Stadio Olimpico; Attendance: 30,407; Referee: Gianpaolo Calvarese

24 April 2016 35	Torino	1–3	Sassuolo	Turin
15:00 CEST (UTC+02:00)	Peres 7'; Gazzi (yellow card) 87'; Moretti (yellow card) 88'	Report	Sansone 2'; Peluso (yellow card) 21', (goal) 75'; Trotta 90+4'	Stadium: Stadio Olimpico di Torino; Attendance: 19,751; Referee: Michael Fabbri

30 April 2016 36	Udinese	1–5	Torino	Udine
18:00 CEST (UTC+02:00)	Heurtaux (yellow card) 43'; Felipe 47', (yellow card) 88'	Report	Jansson 12'; Bovo (yellow card) 37'; Acquah 45'; Martínez 50', 83'; Belotti 56'; Silva (yellow card) 61'	Stadium: Stadio Friuli; Attendance: 16,699; Referee: Maurizio Mariani

8 May 2016 37	Torino	1–2	Napoli	Turin
20:45 CEST (UTC+02:00)	Vives (yellow card) 39' (yellow-red card) 90+2'; Bovo (yellow card) 60'; Jansson (yellow card) 63'; Peres 66'; Benassi (yellow card) 82'	Report	Albiol (yellow card) 3'; Higuaín 12'; Callejón 20'	Stadium: Stadio Olimpico Grande Torino; Attendance: 23,095; Referee: Antonio Damato
Note: On 24 April Torino announced that the Stadio Olimpico di Torino would be renamed the Stadio Olimpico Grande Torino, in honour of the Grande Torino team of the 1940s.

15 May 2016 38	Empoli	2–1	Torino	Empoli
15:00 CEST (UTC+02:00)	Maccarone 12'; Zambelli (yellow card) 31'; Paredes (yellow card) 36'; Zieliński 54'	Report	Obi (yellow card) 26', (goal) 56'	Stadium: Stadio Carlo Castellani; Attendance: 8,791; Referee: Francesco Saia

=== Coppa Italia ===
17 August 2015 Third round	Torino	4–1	Pescara	Turin
21:15 CEST (UTC+02:00)	Baselli 27'; Acquah 33'; Maxi López 67'; Martínez 73'	Report	Ichazo 17' (o.g.); Caprari (yellow card) 43'; Rossi (yellow card) 65'	Stadium: Stadio Olimpico di Torino; Attendance: 13,586; Referee: Davide Massa

1 December 2015 Fourth round	Torino	4–1	Cesena	Turin
18:00 CET (UTC+01:00)	Gazzi 3'; Moretti 13'; Maxi López 51'; Benassi 84'	Report	Magnusson (yellow card) 12'; Renzetti (yellow card) 42'; Cascione 68', (yellow card) 75'; Lucchini (yellow card) 79'; Valzania (yellow card) 81'	Stadium: Stadio Olimpico di Torino; Attendance: 4,962; Referee: Maurizio Mariani

16 December 2015 Round of 16	Juventus	4–0	Torino	Turin
20:45 CEST (UTC+01:00)	Zaza (yellow card) 23', (goal) 28, 51'; Marchisio (yellow card) 39'; Dybala 73'; Pogba 82'	Report	Molinaro (yellow card) 35' (red card) 49'; Acquah (yellow card) 42'	Stadium: Juventus Stadium; Attendance: 27,898; Referee: Daniele Doveri

== Statistics ==
=== Appearances and goals ===
No.	Pos	Nat	Player	Total		Serie A		Coppa Italia	
No.	Pos	Nat	Player	Apps	Goals	Apps	Goals	Apps	Goals
Goalkeepers
1	GK	(Italy) ITA	Daniele Padelli	35	0	35	0	0	0
13	GK	(Italy) ITA	Luca Castellazzi	0	0	0	0	0	0
28	GK	(Uruguay) URU	Salvador Ichazo	6	0	3	0	3	0
Defenders
3	DF	(Italy) ITA	Cristian Molinaro	28	1	22+4	1	2	0
5	DF	(Italy) ITA	Cesare Bovo	24	1	20+1	1	3	0
7	DF	(Italy) ITA	Davide Zappacosta	26	1	13+12	1	1	0
18	DF	(Sweden) SWE	Pontus Jansson	9	1	6+1	1	1+1	0
19	DF	(Serbia) SRB	Nikola Maksimović	16	0	16	0	0	0
21	DF	(Uruguay) URU	Gastón Silva	12	0	10+2	0	0	0
24	DF	(Italy) ITA	Emiliano Moretti	38	2	35	1	3	1
25	DF	(Poland) POL	Kamil Glik	35	0	33	0	2	0
26	DF	(Brazil) BRA	Danilo Avelar	7	0	4+2	0	1	0
33	DF	(Brazil) BRA	Bruno Peres	33	3	30+1	3	2	0
Midfielders
4	MF	(Nigeria) NGA	Joel Obi	11	1	7+3	1	0+1	0
6	MF	(Ghana) GHA	Afriyie Acquah	31	3	22+7	2	2	1
8	MF	(Sweden) SWE	Alexander Farnerud	5	0	0+5	0	0	0
14	MF	(Italy) ITA	Alessandro Gazzi	17	1	11+4	0	2	1
15	MF	(Italy) ITA	Marco Benassi	33	4	21+11	3	1	1
16	MF	(Italy) ITA	Daniele Baselli	38	5	25+10	4	3	1
20	MF	(Italy) ITA	Giuseppe Vives	34	1	28+5	1	1	0
90	MF	(Italy) ITA	Simone Edera	2	0	0+2	0	0	0
Forwards
9	FW	(Italy) ITA	Andrea Belotti	36	12	31+4	12	1	0
10	FW	(Italy) ITA	Ciro Immobile	14	5	11+3	5	0	0
11	FW	(Argentina) ARG	Maxi López	29	6	8+18	4	3	2
17	FW	(Venezuela) VEN	Josef Martínez	23	4	10+11	3	1+1	1
Players transferred out during the season
22	FW	(Italy) ITA	Amauri	2	0	0+1	0	0+1	0
23	MF	(Bosnia and Herzegovina) BIH	Sanjin Prcić	3	0	0+2	0	0+1	0
27	FW	(Italy) ITA	Fabio Quagliarella	17	5	16	5	1	0
44	DF	(Ukraine) UKR	Vasyl Pryima	1	0	0	0	0+1	0

Last updated: 15 May 2016
Source: Competitions

=== Goalscorers ===
Rank	No.	Pos	Nat	Name	Serie A	Coppa Italia	Total
1	9	FW	(Italy)	Andrea Belotti	12	0	12
2	11	FW	(Argentina)	Maxi López	4	2	6
3	10	FW	(Italy)	Ciro Immobile	5	0	5
3	16	MF	(Italy)	Daniele Baselli	4	1	5
3	27	FW	(Italy)	Fabio Quagliarella	5	0	5
6	15	MF	(Italy)	Marco Benassi	3	1	4
6	17	FW	(Venezuela)	Josef Martínez	3	1	4
8	6	MF	(Ghana)	Afriyie Acquah	2	1	3
8	33	DF	(Brazil)	Bruno Peres	3	0	3
10	5	DF	(Italy)	Cesare Bovo	2	0	2
10	24	DF	(Italy)	Emiliano Moretti	1	1	2
12	3	DF	(Italy)	Cristian Molinaro	1	0	1
12	4	MF	(Nigeria)	Joel Obi	1	0	1
12	7	DF	(Italy)	Davide Zappacosta	1	0	1
12	14	MF	(Italy)	Alessandro Gazzi	0	1	1
12	18	DF	(Sweden)	Pontus Jansson	1	0	1
12	20	MF	(Italy)	Giuseppe Vives	1	0	1
Own goal					3	0	3
Totals					52	8	60

Last updated: 15 May 2016

=== Clean sheets ===
Rank	No.	Pos	Nat	Name	Serie A	Coppa Italia	Total
1	1	GK	(Italy)	Daniele Padelli	6	0	6
Totals					6	0	6

Last updated: 15 May 2016

== Bibliography ==
- D'Angelo, Maurizio (2016). 1894-2016/Almanacco Toro. Lulu. ISBN 978-1-326-66553-1.
