= Salvador Ichazo =

Uruguayan footballer (born 1992)

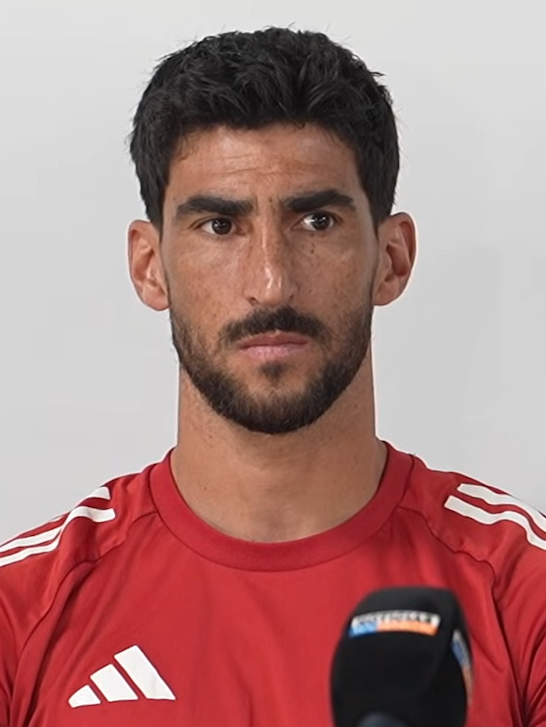

Personal information
- Full name: Salvador Ichazo Fernández
- Date of birth: 26 January 1992 (age 34)
- Place of birth: Montevideo, Uruguay
- Height: 1.88 m (6 ft 2 in)
- Position: Goalkeeper

Team information
- Current team: Independiente Medellín
- Number: 1

Youth career
- Danubio

Senior career*
Years	Team	Apps	(Gls)
2012–2015	Danubio	65	(0)
2015	→ Torino (loan)	1	(0)
2015–2019	Torino	6	(0)
2016–2017	→ Bari (loan)	3	(0)
2017	→ Danubio (loan)	9	(0)
2020	Genoa	0	(0)
2020–2021	Danubio	24	(0)
2021–2022	River Plate	63	(0)
2023	Nacional	15	(0)
2024–2025	Deportivo Pereira	74	(0)
2026–	Independiente Medellín	6	(0)

International career
2009	Uruguay U17	4	(0)
2011	Uruguay U20	10	(0)
- * Club domestic league appearances and goals as of 12 December 2025

Salvador Ichazo Fernández (born 26 January 1992) is a Uruguayan professional footballer who plays as a goalkeeper for Colombian club Independiente Medellín.

== Club career ==
Ichazo began his career with Danubio in 2006, playing for the various youth teams before his debut for the first team in 2012. In 2013, he won the Torneo Apertura and in 2014 he won the final of the Primera División, by saving three penalties in a row in the final against Montevideo Wanderers.

On 26 January 2015, he was officially loaned to Italian Serie A club Torino for six months with a buyout clause. After failing to transfer at the beginning of the transfer window, on 17 July 2015 Torino officially signed him outright.

On 31 August 2016, he was loaned to Serie B side Bari.

On 31 January 2017, he returned to Danubio on loan.

On 14 February 2020, Ichazo signed with Serie A club Genoa until 30 June 2020.

== International career ==
In 2009, he played for the Uruguay under-17 at the 2009 FIFA U-17 World Cup in Nigeria, where he featured in four of the five matches disputed by the Celeste. In May 2011 he won the Suwon Cup with the Uruguay under-20.

== Career statistics ==
As of match played 11 November 2024

Appearances and goals by club, season and competition
Club	Season	League			National cup		Continental		Other		Total	
Club	Season	Division	Apps	Goals	Apps	Goals	Apps	Goals	Apps	Goals	Apps	Goals
Danubio	2012–13	Uruguayan Primera División	17	0	—		0	0	—		17	0
Danubio	2013–14	Uruguayan Primera División	33	0	—		—		—		33	0
Danubio	2014–15	Uruguayan Primera División	15	0	—		2	0	—		17	0
Danubio	Total		65	0	—		2	0	—		67	0
Torino (loan)	2014–15	Serie A	1	0	—		—		—		1	0
Torino	2015–16	Serie A	3	0	3	0	—		—		6	0
Torino	2016–17	Serie A	0	0	0	0	—		—		0	0
Torino	2017–18	Serie A	0	0	0	0	—		—		0	0
Torino	2018–19	Serie A	3	0	2	0	—		—–		5	0
Torino	Total		7	0	5	0	—		—		12	0
Bari (loan)	2016–17	Serie B	3	0	—		—		—		3	0
Danubio (loan)	2017	Uruguayan Primera División	9	0	—		1	0	—		10	0
Genoa	2019–20	Serie A	0	0	—		—		—		0	0
Danubio	2020	Uruguayan Primera División	24	0	—		—		—		24	0
River Plate	2021	Uruguayan Primera División	28	0	—		—		—		28	0
River Plate	2022	Uruguayan Primera División	35	0	—		6	0	—		41	0
River Plate	Total		63	0	—		6	0	—		69	0
Nacional	2023	Uruguayan Primera División	15	0	—		2	0	0	0	17	0
Deportivo Pereira	2024	Categoría Primera A	38	0	—		—		—		38	0
Career total			224	0	5	0	11	0	0	0	240	0

== Honours ==
=== Club ===
Danubio

- Uruguayan Primera División: 2013–14

=== International ===
Uruguay

- Suwon Cup: 2011
- South American U-20 Championship Runner-up: 2011
