= Alessio Sabbione =

Italian footballer (born 1991)

Personal information
- Date of birth: 12 December 1991 (age 34)
- Place of birth: Genoa, Italy
- Height: 1.81 m (5 ft 11 1/2 in)
- Position: Central defender

Team information
- Current team: SC Ligorna

Youth career
- –2008: Sestrese

Senior career*
Years	Team	Apps	(Gls)
2008–2010	Sestrese	34	(1)
2010–2011	Sanremese	1	(0)
2011–2013	Sestri Levante	29	(1)
2013–2014	Nocerina	17	(1)
2014–2019	Carpi	119	(6)
2015–2016	→ Crotone (loan)	7	(1)
2019–2021	Bari	61	(4)
2021–2022	Pordenone	19	(0)
2022–2023	Triestina	17	(0)
2023	→ Alessandria (loan)	9	(0)
2023–2025	Lucchese	38	(0)
2025–	SC Ligorna	26	(3)
- * Club domestic league appearances and goals as of 25 June 2026

Alessio Sabbione (born 12 December 1991) is an Italian footballer who plays as a central defender for Serie D club SC Ligorna.

== Club career ==
On 25 July 2019, he signed a 4-year contract with Bari. On 31 August 2021, he moved to Pordenone on a two-year contract.

On 16 July 2022, Sabbione joined Triestina on a two-year deal. On 26 January 2023, he was loaned to Alessandria.
