= Giuseppe Vives =

Italian footballer

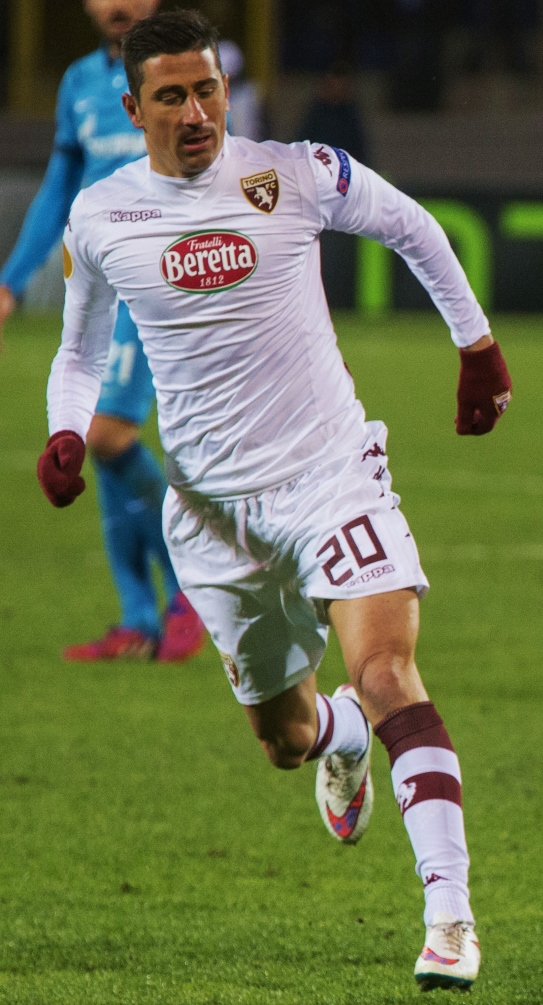
- Vives playing for Torino in 2015

Personal information
- Full name: Giuseppe Vives
- Date of birth: 14 July 1980 (age 46)
- Place of birth: Afragola, Italy
- Height: 1.78 m (5 ft 10 in)
- Position: Midfielder

Senior career*
Years	Team	Apps	(Gls)
1997–2000	Sant'Anastasia	56	(1)
2000–2001	Juve Stabia	28	(1)
2001–2003	Ancona	0	(0)
2002	→ Nardò (loan)	6	(1)
2002–2003	→ Taranto (loan)	1	(0)
2003–2006	Giugliano	100	(6)
2006–2011	Lecce	158	(9)
2011–2017	Torino	151	(5)
2017–2018	Pro Vercelli	53	(5)
2018–2019	Ternana	2	(0)
- * Club domestic league appearances and goals

Giuseppe Vives (born 14 July 1980) is a former Italian professional footballer who played as a midfielder.

== Club career ==
=== Early career ===
Vives grew up playing football in Naples for local club Napoli Club Afragola until the age of 17, before transferring to Sant'Anastasia, with whom he played in Serie D in the 1997–1998 season and then in Serie C2 (1999–2000). In 2000–2001 he played for Juve Stabia in Serie C2 and the year after for Nardò.

=== Ancona ===
In 2001–2002, he was acquired for 800,000 lire by Ancona, coached by Luciano Spalletti. He had the chance to make his debut in Serie B, but persistent physical problems forced him on the fringes of the team, forcing him to reconsider his football career in order to devote himself to becoming a professional accountant. In the 2002–2003, he collected a mere appearance for Taranto in Serie C1 and at the end of the season returns to Ancona, never making an appearance.

=== Giugliano ===
In the 2003–2004 season he was acquired by Giugliano of Serie C2, finally being able to play with continuity and at good levels. After 3 seasons with the Campania side, he collects 101 appearances and scores 6 goals, attracting the attention of many Serie A and Serie B clubs.

=== Lecce ===
In the summer of 2006, after numerous rumours of him joining Salernitana, Avellino, Cavese and even Napoli, he was purchased by Lecce on the advice of Zdeněk Zeman. In the 2006–2007 Serie B season, he quickly became a cornerstone of the Salento midfield, able to play in a cover and playmaking role. He scored his first goal in the cadets against Triestina and repeated himself on the last day of the season against Pescara.

In the 2007–2008 Serie B season, he was one of the protagonists of the seventh promotion of Lecce in Serie A, scoring 4 goals and contributing numerous assists, including 2 goals that allowed Lecce to reach the play-offs.

On 31 August 2008 he made his debut in Serie A in Torino-Lecce 3-0 and 28 January 2009 scored his first goal in the top flight by scoring the momentary advantage in Verona against Chievo Verona (1-1). His first season in the top flight concluded with 18 appearances and a goal, but the club could not avoid relegation and returned to Serie B.

The following season Lecce won their eighth promotion to Serie A. The coach Luigi De Canio showed great confidence in Vives and his quality of play, who finished the season with 38 appearances and 2 goals. Vives was instated as vice-captain of the side and at the end of the season was voted by the newspaper La Gazzetta dello Sport as the best midfielder in Serie B.

On 3 October 2010, the sixth matchday of the 2010–2011 Serie A, he wore the captain's armband for the first time in a 1–0 win against Catania. The Lecce formation coached by De Canio, achieved salvation on the penultimate day of the season.

=== Torino ===
On 14 July 2011, he was sold to Torino in Serie B for €500,000. He made his competitive debut on 13 August 2011 in Coppa Italia, won 1–0 against Lumezzane. On 10 December he scored his first goal for Torino in a 4–2 win against Pescara. At the end of the season Torino were promoted to Serie A, with Vives contributing 29 appearances and two goals.

On 22 December 2013, he scored his first goal for Torino in Serie A during a 4–1 win against Chievo. On 1 August 2014, he made his debut in UEFA competitions in a 3–0 defeat of Brommapojkarna. On 25 November 2015 he renewed his contract with the club until 2017.

In the summer of 2016, following the transfer of teammate Kamil Glik to Monaco, he was assigned the captain's armband. Having lost his position in the starting lineup to Mirko Valdifiori, on 29 January 2017 he was called up for his final match with Torino in a 1–1 draw at home with Atalanta. At the end of the match he was given a standing ovation under the Curva Maratona. He concluded his experience in Turin after five-and-a-half seasons, 164 appearances and five goals.

=== Pro Vercelli ===
On 30 January 2017 he moved to Pro Vercelli in Serie B.

== Career statistics ==
=== Club ===
Updated 10 May 2016.

Club	Season	League			Cup		Europe		Other		Total	
Club	Season	Division	Apps	Goals	Apps	Goals	Apps	Goals	Apps	Goals	Apps	Goals
Torino	2011–12	Serie B	29	2	2	0	–		–		31	2
Torino	2012–13	Serie A	25	0	2	0	–		–		27	0
Torino	2013–14	Serie A	33	1	0	0	–		–		33	1
Torino	2014–15	Serie A	28	1	0	0	7 (Note: All appearances in UEFA Europa League)	0	–		35	1
Torino	2015–16	Serie A	33	1	1	0	–		–		34	1
Total			148	5	5	0	7	0	—		160	5
Career Total			505	23	11	1	7	0	—		523	24

== Honours ==
- Serie B

Lecce: Serie B 2009–2010
