= Angelo Iorio =

Italian footballer (born 1982)

Personal information
- Date of birth: 26 August 1982 (age 44)
- Place of birth: Genoa, Italy
- Height: 1.80 m (5 ft 11 in)
- Position: Central defender

Team information
- Current team: Grosseto
- Number: 4

Youth career
- Genoa

Senior career*
| Years | Team | Apps | (Gls) |
| 2000–2002 | Genoa | 8 | (0) |
| 2002–2006 | Cremonese | 81 | (2) |
| 2003–2004 | → Genoa (loan) | 1 | (0) |
| 2006–2010 | Piacenza | 79 | (0) |
| 2010– | Grosseto | | |

International career
| 2000–2001 | Italy U18 | 4 | (0) |
| 2002 | Italy U21 Serie B | 1 | (0) |
- * Club domestic league appearances and goals

Angelo Iorio (born 26 August 1982) is an Italian footballer who plays for Serie B club Grosseto.

== Biography ==
Born in Genoa, Liguria, Iorio started his career with Genoa C.F.C. In 2002–03 season, he was signed by Serie C2 club Cremonese. He was loaned back to Genoa in 2003–04 season. On 1 July 2004 he returned to Cremonese and won Serie C1 champion in 2005.

After a Serie B season with Cremonese which the team finished as the second from the bottom, he was signed by Piacenza in co-ownership deal. On 26 August 2008, Piacenza bought him outright by submitted a higher price to Lega Calcio in a closed tender.

In July 2010, he left for fellow Serie B team Grosseto.

=== International career ===
He played 2 matches in 2001 UEFA European Under-18 Football Championship qualification. He also played for Italy under-21 Serie B representative team against Romania U21 in 2002.
