= Sergiu Suciu =

Romanian footballer

Personal information
- Date of birth: 8 May 1990 (age 36)
- Place of birth: Satu Mare, Romania
- Height: 1.84 m (6 ft 0 in)
- Position: Midfielder

Youth career
- 2000–2003: Olimpia Satu Mare
- 2003–2009: Torino

Senior career*
Years	Team	Apps	(Gls)
2009–2016	Torino	6	(1)
2009–2010	→ Legnano (loan)	16	(1)
2011	→ Gubbio (loan)	9	(0)
2013–2014	→ Juve Stabia (loan)	36	(3)
2014–2015	→ Crotone (loan)	30	(0)
2015–2016	→ Lecce (loan)	8	(0)
2016	→ Cremonese (loan)	14	(0)
2016–2017	Pordenone	40	(1)
2017–2020	Venezia	56	(1)
2021	Juve Stabia	10	(0)
2021–2022	Chindia Târgoviște	8	(0)
2022	Pistoiese	13	(2)
2022–2023	Torres	9	(0)
2023–2024	Trento	29	(0)
2024	Acireale	0	(0)
Total		284	(9)

International career
2009–2010	Romania U19	7	(3)
2011–2012	Romania U21	5	(0)
- * Club domestic league appearances and goals as of 28 April 2024

Sergiu Suciu (born 8 May 1990) is a Romanian former professional footballer who played as a midfielder.

== Club career ==
Sergiu moved to Italy with his parents at the age of 13 and soon became affiliated with Torino under club president Franco Cimminelli in 2003. However, due to lack of Italian residency he was unable to play in any official matches for some time. After several years with the youth team, he stood out as one of the best players at the prestigious Torneo di Viareggio in 2009, scoring a brace against Bologna.

After making the bench several times for the senior side, he made his Serie A debut for Torino on 31 May 2009 in a game against Roma when he came on as a last-minute substitute for Tommaso Vailatti. Torino were relegated at the end of the season and Sergiu was loaned to third division team Legnano, headed by former Torino youth coach Beppe Scienza. He was recalled by Torino on 1 February 2011 to play in the Torneo di Viareggio, but his season was abruptly ended after rupturing the ACL in his left knee.

On 3 January 2011, he signed a new 4 1/2—year contract, but was loaned again to Gubbio in Prima Divisione. After attaining his Italian passport in the Summer of 2011, he became part of the Torino first team under Giampiero Ventura. He made his debut in Serie B on 24 September 2011 as a substitute during Torino-Nocerina. On 30 September 2011, he scored his first goal of the season in a 2–1 victory away to Sampdoria, but also injuring himself for 45 days.

On 26 May 2012 he was injured once again during Albinoleffe-Torino, tearing a ligament after a clash with an opponent.

On 31 January 2013 he was loaned to Juve Stabia in Serie B. He debuted as a starter on 2 February in the away fixture against Vicenza, remaining on the pitch for the full 90 minutes and showed a great performance for the decisive victory of 2–1 for The Wasps. He scored his first goal on 19 May in an away game to Crotone (the momentary 1–3). He returned to Turin at the end of the season but on 8 July, he was again loaned to the club from Campania. The following year he was loaned to Crotone.

On 5 August 2015 he moved to Lecce in Lega Pro with an obligation to purchase his contract in case of promotion to Serie B.

In the summer of 2016 he moved to Pordenone.

On 15 February 2021 he returned to Juve Stabia, now in Serie C.

On 10 August 2022, Suciu signed with Serie C club Torres. On 4 January 2023, he moved to Trento on a 1.5-year contract.

== Honours ==
Gubbio

- Lega Pro Prima Divisione: 2010–11
