= Daniele Baselli =

Italian footballer (born 1992)

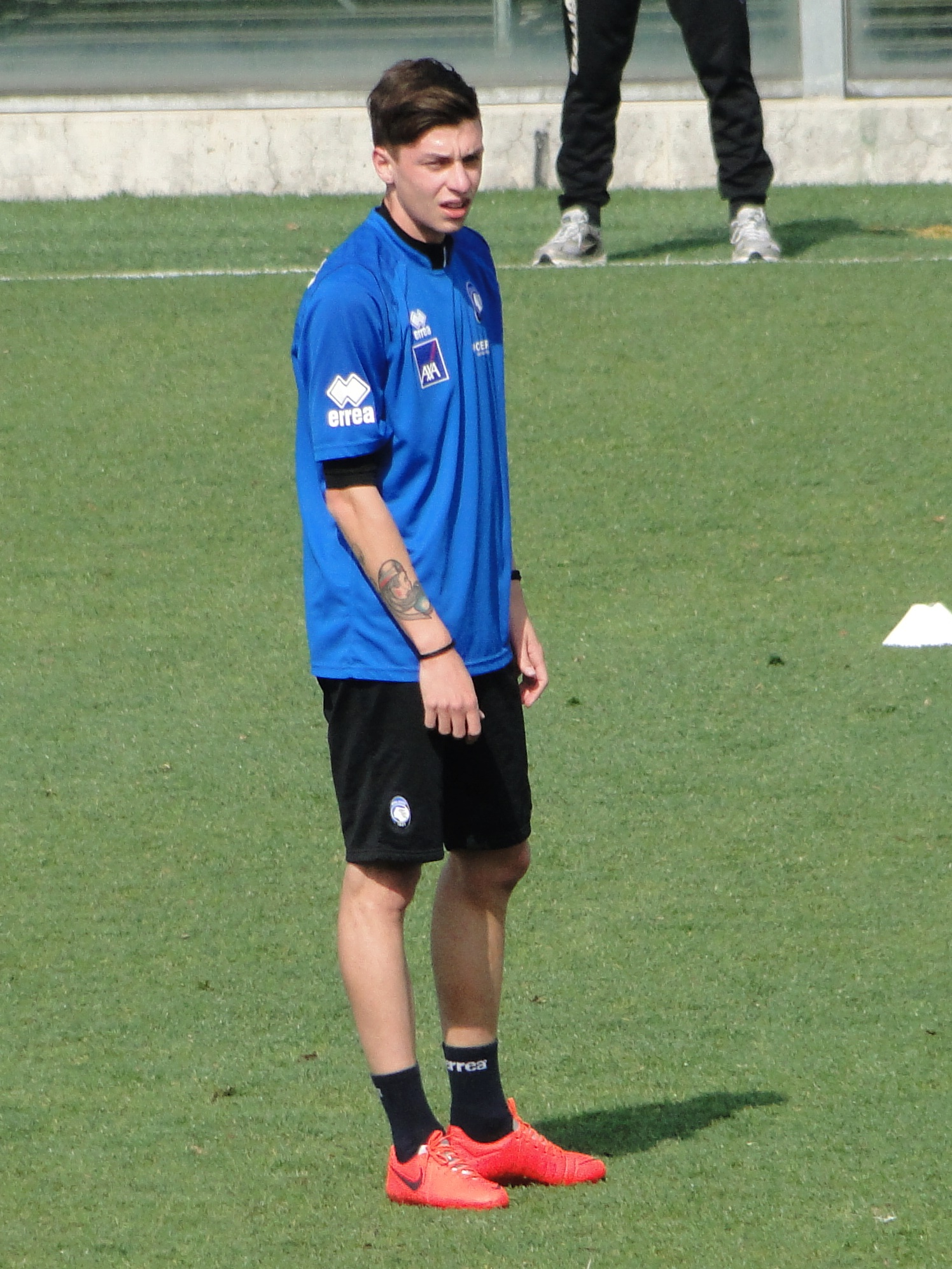
- Baselli training with Atalanta in 2014

Personal information
- Date of birth: 12 March 1992 (age 34)
- Place of birth: Brescia, Italy
- Height: 1.82 m (6 ft 0 in)
- Position: Midfielder

Team information
- Current team: Al Ittifaq

Youth career
- 2000–2011: Atalanta

Senior career*
Years	Team	Apps	(Gls)
2011–2013	Cittadella	50	(1)
2013–2015	Atalanta	50	(2)
2015–2022	Torino	175	(18)
2022	Cagliari	9	(0)
2022–2025	Como	44	(1)
2025–2026	Padova	8	(0)
2026–2026	Chievo	0	(0)
2026–	Al Ittifaq	0	(0)

International career^{‡}
2009	Italy U18	2	(0)
2011	Italy U19	1	(0)
2012–2015	Italy U21	12	(0)
2018	Italy	1	(0)
- * Club domestic league appearances and goals as of 1 February 2026 ‡ National team caps and goals as of 4 June 2018

Daniele Baselli (Italian pronunciation: [daˈnjɛːle baˈzɛlli]; born 12 March 1992) is an Italian professional footballer who plays as a midfielder for UAE club Al Ittifaq. He has also appeared for the Italy national team, earning one cap in 2018.

== Club career ==
=== Early career ===
Baselli was born in Brescia and joined Atalanta's youth system in 2000, aged 8. In the 2010–11 season he was promoted to the club's Primavera, for which he appeared in 22 league matches and scored five goals. He also collected some appearances on the bench for the first team both in Serie B and Coppa Italia.

=== Cittadella ===
On 13 July 2011 he was sold to Serie B club Cittadella in a co-ownership deal for a nominal fee of €500, for which he made his debut in a 1–2 loss in Coppa Italia to Fiorentina. He made his debut in the league on 27 August, starting in a 2–1 home success against AlbinoLeffe. He finished the 2011–12 season with 13 appearances in the league, including 10 as a starter.

After the renewal of the co-ownership between the two clubs he remained in Veneto the following season, during which he took part in two matches of Coppa Italia and 37 in the league, even scoring his professional goal on 18 May 2013, netting the winner in a home win over Ascoli.

=== Return to Atalanta ===
On 20 June 2013 he returned to Atalanta, after the Bergamo side bought the other half of the player's rights for €803,500, with Cittadella offering a reported €50,000 less. He signed a four-year deal with Atalanta, and made his debut for the club on 18 August, playing the last 17 minutes and assisting Giuseppe De Luca in the last goal of a 3–0 home win over Bari.

On 1 September Baselli made his Serie A debut, coming on as a second-half substitute in a 2–0 home success over Torino; he was handed his first start in the main category of Italian football thirteen days later, in a 0–2 loss against Napoli. He scored his first goal in Serie A on 10 May 2015 in Palermo, scoring the 1–0 against the Rosaneri.

=== Torino ===
On 10 July 2015, he was sold to Torino, in the same transfer that also brought Davide Zappacosta to Piedmont, for a total of €10.3 million. Baselli made his competitive debut for Torino on 17 August in the third round of Coppa Italia against Pescara, scoring Torino's first goal in a 4–1 win. On 23 August, he scored his first goal in Serie A with Torino in a 2–1 win away to Frosinone. He concluded the 2014–15 season with 35 appearances and four goals.

On 20 August 2016, he scored his first goal of the 2016–17 season in a 3–2 loss against Milan at the San Siro. He concluded the season with 37 appearances and six goals. On 12 July 2017, he renewed his contract with Torino until 2022.

Baselli continued to play as a starter for Torino in the 2017–18 season, first under the manager Siniša Mihajlović, and later under Walter Mazzarri. On 6 May 2018, he captained Torino for the first time during a 2–2 draw at the Stadio San Paolo against Napoli. He concluded his third season with Torino making 32 appearances and scoring 4 goals, earning his first call-up to the Italy national football team.

On 25 July 2019, in his fifth season for Torino, he makes his UEFA club competition debut in the Europa League first qualifying round against Debreceni VSC (3-0). He played for Torino for another 2 1/2 seasons, struggling to find playing time due to multiple injuries and technical choices.

=== Cagliari ===
On 28 January 2022, he was sold outright to Cagliari.

=== Como ===
On 9 August 2022, Baselli joined Como on a free transfer. He left Como on 12 February 2025.

=== Padova ===
On 11 July 2025, Baselli signed a one-season contract with Serie B club Padova.

== International career ==
In 2009, he played two friendly matches with the Italy under-18. On 24 September 2009 he made his debut with the under-19 in the match won 3–0 against Turkey.

On 13 November 2012 he made his debut with the under-21, in the friendly match won 1–0 against Spain. He was called up by Devis Mangia for a friendly won the following 6 February against Germany, but did not play. On 14 August 2013 he played as a starter in the friendly match won by the Azzurri 4–1 against Slovakia. On 5 September 2013, he played as a starter under Luigi Di Biagio in the match against Belgium, valid for the 2015 UEFA European Under-21 Championship qualifiers.

From 10 to 12 March 2014, he was called up to the senior national team by coach Cesare Prandelli as part of an internship to evaluate young players ahead of the 2014 FIFA World Cup, confirmed on the next meeting between 14 and 15 April. He took part in the 2015 UEFA European Under-21 Championship in the Czech Republic.

Baselli earned his first senior cap in an 8–0 drubbing of San Marino in an unofficial friendly match on 31 May 2017, for Italy national football B team. He started the game and played 45 minutes, before being replaced by fellow debutant Lorenzo Pellegrini.

On 19 May 2018 Baselli was called up to the Italy senior national team by coach Roberto Mancini for the team's friendlies against Saudi Arabia, France and the Netherlands. He made his official debut for the Italy senior side on 4 June, in a 1–1 friendly draw against the Netherlands in Turin, coming on as a second-half substitute for Jorginho.

== Style of play ==
According to his agent Giuseppe Riso: "His role is certainly as a central midfielder, not in front of the defence. Over time he will be able to play as a metodista however right now his movement is quite dangerous when he makes runs into the opposing area. He is a 'box to box midfielder'". An elegant, technically gifted, and complete midfielder, Baselli is a clean tackler and a competent passer with both feet; due to his attributes, he is capable of winning balls, scoring goals, or creating chances for his team.

== Career statistics ==
=== Club ===
As of match played 29 September 2024.

Club	Season	League			Cup		Europe		Other		Total	
Club	Season	Division	Apps	Goals	Apps	Goals	Apps	Goals	Apps	Goals	Apps	Goals
Cittadella	2011–12	Serie B	13	0	1	0	—		—		14	0
Cittadella	2012–13	Serie B	37	1	2	0	—		—		39	1
Cittadella	Total		50	1	3	0	—		—		53	1
Atalanta	2013–14	Serie A	28	0	3	0	—		—		31	0
Atalanta	2014–15	Serie A	22	2	2	0	—		—		24	2
Atalanta	Total		50	2	5	0	—		—		55	2
Torino	2015–16	Serie A	35	4	3	1	—		—		38	5
Torino	2016–17	Serie A	37	6	2	0	—		—		39	6
Torino	2017–18	Serie A	32	4	2	0	—		—		34	4
Torino	2018–19	Serie A	34	4	3	1	—		—		37	5
Torino	2019–20	Serie A	16	0	0	0	5	0	—		21	0
Torino	2020–21	Serie A	15	0	0	0	—		—		15	0
Torino	2021–22	Serie A	6	0	1	0	—		—		7	0
Torino	Total		175	18	11	2	5	0	—		191	20
Cagliari	2021–22	Serie A	9	0	0	0	—		—		9	0
Como	2022–23	Serie B	18	1	0	0	—		—		18	1
Como	2023–24	Serie B	24	0	1	0	—		—		25	0
Como	2024–25	Serie A	2	0	1	0	—		—		3	0
Como	Total		44	1	2	0	—		—		46	1
Career Total			329	22	21	2	5	0	—		354	24

=== International ===
As of 4 June 2018

National team	Year	Apps	Goals
Italy
Italy	2018	1	0
Total		1	0

== Honours ==
=== Club ===
Atalanta

- Torneo Città di Arco (2): 2008, 2009
- Campionato Berretti: 2008–09
