= Marco Chiosa =

Italian footballer (born 1993)

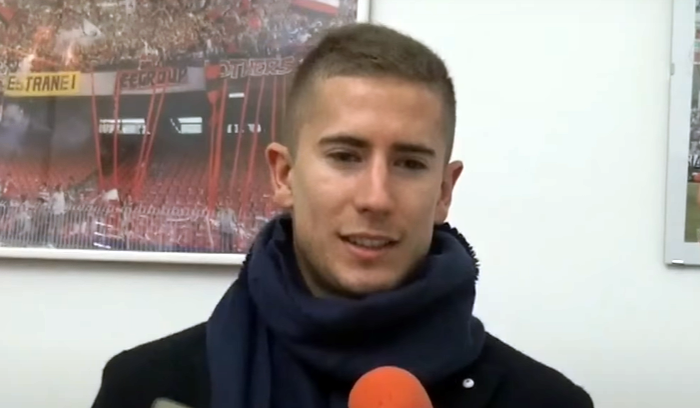

Personal information
- Date of birth: 19 November 1993 (age 32)
- Place of birth: Cirié, Italy
- Height: 1.81 m (5 ft 11 in)
- Position: Centre-back

Team information
- Current team: Arezzo
- Number: 19

Youth career
- –2012: Torino

Senior career*
Years	Team	Apps	(Gls)
2010–2017	Torino	0	(0)
2012–2013	→ Nocerina (loan)	25	(1)
2013–2014	→ Bari (loan)	25	(0)
2014–2016	→ Avellino (loan)	61	(0)
2016–2017	→ Perugia (loan)	4	(0)
2017–2019	Novara	61	(1)
2019–2023	Virtus Entella	130	(1)
2023–	Arezzo	81	(2)

International career
2011	Italy U19	1	(0)
2013–2015	Italy U20	3	(0)
2013–2015	Italy U21 Serie B	6	(0)
- * Club domestic league appearances and goals as of 30 April 2026

Marco Chiosa (born 19 November 1993) is an Italian professional footballer who plays as a centre-back for Serie B club Arezzo.

== Club career ==
Chiosa began his career in the Torino youth system, and played two seasons with the Primavera squad in 2010–11 and 2011–12. He was first called up to the senior team on 27 May 2012, an away game against AlbinoLeffe, without making his official debut.

In the next two seasons he was transferred on loan to Nocerina in Lega Pro and Bari in Serie B. In Apulia he made his debut in Serie B on 23 August 2013, an away game against Reggina, 0–0.

In the 2014–15 season, he was loaned to Avellino. On 1 July 2015, the loan expired and he returned to Turin; however on 13 July he returned to Avellino for another season.

In the 2016–17 season, he was loaned to Perugia, but was recalled in January and loaned to Novara. In June 2017, Novara purchased him outright for €500,000.

On 27 January 2019, he signed with Virtus Entella.

On 25 August 2023, Chiosa joined Arezzo on a two-year contract.

== International career ==
He has earned call-ups for Italy at under-19 and under-20 levels. On 10 January 2014, he was called up to the under-21 side by Luigi Di Biagio.
