= Massimiliano Irrati =

Italian football referee (born 1979)

- Born: 27 June 1979 (age 47); Florence, Italy

Domestic
Years	League	Role
2011–2013	Serie B	Referee
2012–	Serie A	Referee

International
Years	League	Role
2017–2022	FIFA listed	Referee

Massimiliano Irrati (born 27 June 1979) is a professional Italian football referee.

Irrati made his Serie B debut on 27 August 2011, officiating a match between Cittadella and AlbinoLeffe. On 18 March 2012, he made his debut in Serie A, refereeing a match between Bologna and ChievoVerona.

In 2017, Irrati became FIFA listed, officiating his first senior international match on 22 February 2017, a friendly between San Marino and Andorra. Irrati made his club international debut on 13 July 2017, officiating a match between Luxembourgish club Progrès Niederkorn and Greek club AEL Limassol in the 2017–18 UEFA Europa League second qualifying round.

On 30 April 2018, Irrati was selected by FIFA as one of the video assistant referees for the 2018 FIFA World Cup in Russia, the first FIFA World Cup to use the technology. Irrati was appointed as VAR in his first World Cup match between Russia and Saudi Arabia on 14 June 2018 in Group A, the opening match of the tournament. On 12 July 2018, Irrati was appointed as the VAR for the 2018 FIFA World Cup Final between France and Croatia. In total, Irrati was the main VAR for 14 matches during the tournament, the most of any official.

== See also ==
- List of football referees
