= 2020–21 Torino FC season =

Torino
2020–21 season
- Chairman: Urbano Cairo
- Head coach: Marco Giampaolo (until 19 January 2021); Davide Nicola (from 19 January 2021)
- Stadium: Stadio Olimpico Grande Torino
- Serie A: 17th
- Coppa Italia: Round of 16
- Top goalscorer: League: Andrea Belotti (13); All: Andrea Belotti (13)
Home colours	Away colours	Third colours

The 2020–21 season was the 110th season in the existence of Torino FC and the club's ninth consecutive season in the top flight of Italian football. In addition to the domestic league, Torino participated in this season's edition of the Coppa Italia. The season covered the period from 3 August 2020 to 30 June 2021.

== Players ==
=== First-team squad ===
As of 1 February 2021

Note: Flags indicate national team as defined under FIFA eligibility rules; some limited exceptions apply. Players may hold more than one non-FIFA nationality.

No.	Pos.	Nation	Player
3	DF	BRA	Bremer
4	DF	BRA	Lyanco
5	DF	ITA	Armando Izzo
7	MF	SRB	Saša Lukić
8	MF	ITA	Daniele Baselli
9	FW	ITA	Andrea Belotti (captain)
10	MF	BIH	Amer Gojak (on loan from Dinamo Zagreb)
11	FW	ITA	Simone Zaza
13	DF	SUI	Ricardo Rodríguez
15	DF	ARG	Cristian Ansaldi
17	DF	CIV	Wilfried Singo
18	GK	KOS	Samir Ujkani
19	FW	PAR	Antonio Sanabria

No.	Pos.	Nation	Player
24	FW	ITA	Simone Verdi
26	FW	ITA	Federico Bonazzoli (on loan from Sampdoria)
27	DF	KOS	Mërgim Vojvoda
29	DF	ITA	Nicola Murru (on loan from Sampdoria)
32	GK	SRB	Vanja Milinković-Savić
33	DF	CMR	Nicolas Nkoulou
38	MF	ITA	Rolando Mandragora (on loan from Juventus)
39	GK	ITA	Salvatore Sirigu (vice-captain)
45	DF	ECU	Erick Ferigra
77	MF	POL	Karol Linetty
88	MF	VEN	Tomás Rincón
99	DF	ITA	Alessandro Buongiorno

=== Other players under contract ===
Note: Flags indicate national team as defined under FIFA eligibility rules; some limited exceptions apply. Players may hold more than one non-FIFA nationality.

No.	Pos.	Nation	Player
95	DF	ITA	Christian Celesia
—	DF	ITA	Matteo Procopio

No.	Pos.	Nation	Player
—	MF	FRA	Ibrahim Karamoko

=== Out on loan ===
As of 2 February 2021

Note: Flags indicate national team as defined under FIFA eligibility rules; some limited exceptions apply. Players may hold more than one non-FIFA nationality.

No.	Pos.	Nation	Player
—	GK	ITA	Luca Gemello (at Renate until 30 June 2021)
—	DF	NGR	Ola Aina (at Fulham until 30 June 2021)
—	DF	ITA	Stefano Cuoco (at Lentigione until 30 June 2021)
—	DF	CIV	Koffi Djidji (at Crotone until 30 June 2021)
—	DF	ITA	Moris Sportelli (at Arezzo until 30 June 2021)
—	MF	FRA	Ndary Adopo (at Viterbese until 30 June 2021)
—	MF	CIV	Ben Lhassine Kone (at Cosenza until 30 June 2021)
—	MF	FRA	Soualiho Meïté (at Milan until 30 June 2021)

No.	Pos.	Nation	Player
—	MF	ROU	Mihael Onișa (at Imolese until 30 June 2021)
—	MF	ITA	Jacopo Segre (at SPAL until 30 June 2021)
—	FW	ARG	Lucas Boyé (at Elche until 30 June 2021)
—	FW	MDA	Vitalie Damașcan (at RKC Waalwijk until 30 June 2021)
—	FW	ITA	Simone Edera (at Reggina until 30 June 2021)
—	FW	ESP	Iago Falque (at Benevento until 30 June 2021)
—	FW	ITA	Vincenzo Millico (at Frosinone until 30 June 2021)
—	FW	ITA	Nicola Rauti (at Palermo until 30 June 2021)

== Pre-season and friendlies ==
Win Draw Loss

29 August 2020 Friendly	Torino (Italy)	4–1	(Italy) Novara	Turin, Italy
18:00 CEST (UTC+2)				Stadium: Stadio Olimpico Grande Torino

2 September 2020 Friendly	Torino (Italy)	1–1	(Italy) Pro Patria	Turin, Italy
18:00 CEST (UTC+2)				Stadium: Stadio Olimpico Grande Torino

5 September 2020 Friendly	Torino (Italy)	1–2	(Italy) Pro Vercelli	Turin, Italy
18:00 CEST (UTC+2)				Stadium: Stadio Olimpico Grande Torino

12 September 2020 Friendly	Torino (Italy)	Cancelled	(Italy) Sampdoria	Turin, Italy
18:00 CEST (UTC+2)				Stadium: Stadio Olimpico Grande Torino

== Competitions ==
=== Overview ===
Competition	First match	Last match	Starting round	Final position	Record							
Competition	First match	Last match	Starting round	Final position	Pld	W	D	L	GF	GA	GD	Win %
Serie A	19 September 2020	23 May 2021	Matchday 1	17th	38	7	16	15	50	69	−19	18.42
Coppa Italia	28 October 2020	12 January 2021	Third round	Round of 16	3	2	1	0	5	1	+4	66.67
Total					41	9	17	15	55	70	−15	21.95

Last updated: 23 May 2021
Source: Soccerway

=== Serie A ===
==== League table ====
Pos	Team	Pld	W	D	L	GF	GA	GD	Pts	Qualification or relegation
15	Spezia	38	9	12	17	52	72	−20	39	
16	Cagliari	38	9	10	19	43	59	−16	37	
17	Torino	38	7	16	15	50	69	−19	37	
18	Benevento (R)	38	7	12	19	40	75	−35	33	Relegation to Serie B
19	Crotone (R)	38	6	5	27	45	92	−47	23	Relegation to Serie B

Source: Serie A, Soccerway
Rules for classification: 1) Points; 2) Head-to-head points; 3) Head-to-head goal difference; 4) Goal difference; 5) Goals scored; 6) Draw. (Note: Head-to-head record is used only after all the matches between the teams in question have been played)
(R) Relegated

==== Results summary ====
Overall								Home						Away					
Pld	W	D	L	GF	GA	GD	Pts	W	D	L	GF	GA	GD	W	D	L	GF	GA	GD
38	7	16	15	50	69	−19	37	3	9	7	25	36	−11	4	7	8	25	33	−8

Last updated: 23 May 2021.
Source: Serie A

==== Results by round ====
Round	1	2	3	4	5	6	7	8	9	10	11	12	13	14	15	16	17	18	19	20	21	22	23	24	25	26	27	28	29	30	31	32	33	34	35	36	37	38
Ground	A	H	A	H	A	H	H	A	H	A	H	A	H	A	A	H	A	H	A	H	A	H	A	H	A	A	H	A	H	A	H	A	H	H	A	H	A	H
Result	L	L	W	L	D	L	D	L	D	L	L	L	D	D	W	D	L	D	D	D	D	D	W	W	D	L	L	L	D	W	W	D	L	W	D	L	L	D
Position	15	16	20	20	19	18	17	18	18	18	18	19	18	20	17	17	18	18	17	17	17	17	17	17	18	18	17	17	17	17	15	16	16	15	15	16	17	17

Updated to match(es) played on 23 May 2021. Source: Serie A
A = Away; H = Home; W = Win; D = Draw; L = Loss

==== Matches ====
The league fixtures were announced on 2 September 2020.

19 September 2020 1	Fiorentina	1–0	Torino	Florence
18:00 CEST (UTC+2)	Milenković (yellow card) 15'; Cáceres (yellow card) 44'; Biraghi (yellow card) 58'; Castrovilli 78'	Report	Linetty (yellow card) 60'	Stadium: Stadio Artemio Franchi; Referee: Rosario Abisso

26 September 2020 2	Torino	2–4	Atalanta	Turin
15:00 CEST (UTC+2)	Belotti 11', 43'; Zaza (yellow card) 39'	Report	Gómez 13'; Muriel 21'; Caldara (yellow card) 30'; Hateboer 42'; De Roon 54'; Freuler (yellow card) 87'	Stadium: Stadio Olimpico Grande Torino; Referee: Massimiliano Irrati

18 October 2020 4	Torino	2–3	Cagliari	Turin
15:00 CEST (UTC+2)	Belotti 4' (pen.), 49'; Rincón (yellow card) 31'; Bonazzoli (yellow card) 65'; Milinković-Savić (red card) 87'	Report	João Pedro 12'; Simeone 19', 73'; Rog (yellow card) 31'; Lykogiannis (yellow card) 75'; Pavoletti (yellow card) 89'	Stadium: Stadio Olimpico Grande Torino; Referee: Federico La Penna

23 October 2020 5	Sassuolo	3–3	Torino	Reggio Emilia
20:45 CEST (UTC+2)	Ferrari (yellow card) 59'; Đuričić 71'; Berardi (yellow card) 78'; Chiricheș 84'; Caputo 85'	Report	Vojvoda (yellow card) 27'; Linetty 33'; Rincón (yellow card) 73'; Belotti 77'; Lukić 79'	Stadium: Mapei Stadium; Referee: Marco Guida

1 November 2020 6	Torino	3–4	Lazio	Turin
15:00 CET (UTC+1)	Bremer 19'; Belotti 24' (pen.); Lukić 87'; Nkoulou (yellow card) 90+5'; Rincón (yellow card) 90+7'	Report	Pereira 15', (yellow card) 44'; Milinković-Savić 49'; Hoedt (yellow card) 86'; Immobile (yellow card) 88', (goal) 90+5' (pen.); Caicedo 90+8', (yellow card) 90+9'	Stadium: Stadio Olimpico Grande Torino; Attendance: 0 Referee: Daniele Chiffi

4 November 2020 3	Genoa	1–2	Torino	Genoa
17:00 CET (UTC+1)	Badelj (yellow card) 31'; Rovella (yellow card) 51'; Scamacca 90+4'	Report	Lukić 10', (yellow card) 90+3'; Gojak (yellow card) 23'; Pellegrini 26' (o.g.); Rincón (yellow card) 45+3'; Singo (yellow card) 68'	Stadium: Stadio Luigi Ferraris; Attendance: 0 Referee: Paolo Valeri
Note: The match originally scheduled for 3 October, but postponed due to 14 confirmed cases of COVID-19 at Genoa.

8 November 2020 7	Torino	0–0	Crotone	Turin
15:00 CET (UTC+1)	Verdi (yellow card) 41'; Rodríguez (yellow card) 59'; Belotti (yellow card) 78'	Report	Vulić (yellow card) 5'; Luperto (yellow card) 56' (yellow-red card) 87'; Pereira (yellow card) 81'	Stadium: Stadio Olimpico Grande Torino; Attendance: 0 Referee: Francesco Fourneau

22 November 2020 8	Internazionale	4–2	Torino	Milan
15:00 CET (UTC+1)	D'Ambrosio (yellow card) 35'; Bastoni (yellow card) 46'; Young (yellow card) 61'; Sánchez 64'; Lukaku 67', 84' (pen.); Martínez 90'	Report	Verdi (yellow card) 31'; Zaza 45+2'; Ansaldi 62' (pen.); Singo (yellow card) 70'	Stadium: Stadio Giuseppe Meazza; Attendance: 0 Referee: Federico La Penna

30 November 2020 9	Torino	2–2	Sampdoria	Turin
18:30 CET (UTC+1)	Belotti 25'; Lyanco (yellow card) 61'; Meïté 77'	Report	Candreva 54'; Tonelli (yellow card) 59'; Quagliarella 63'; Ferrari (yellow card) 84'	Stadium: Stadio Olimpico Grande Torino; Attendance: 0 Referee: Daniele Doveri

5 December 2020 10	Juventus	2–1	Torino	Turin
18:00 CET (UTC+1)	Kulusevski (yellow card) 51'; De Ligt (yellow card) 72'; McKennie 77'; Bonucci 89'; Pinsoglio (red card) 90'; Cuadrado (yellow card) 90+4'	Report	Nkoulou 9'; Lyanco (yellow card) 70'; Lukić (yellow card) 76'; Bonazzoli (yellow card) 90+6'	Stadium: Allianz Stadium; Attendance: 0 Referee: Daniele Orsato

12 December 2020 11	Torino	2–3	Udinese	Turin
18:00 CET (UTC+1)	Lyanco (yellow card) 37'; Vojvoda (yellow card) 51'; Belotti 66'; Bonazzoli 67'; Lukić (yellow card) 88'	Report	Pussetto 24'; Pereyra (yellow card) 37'; De Paul 54'; Nestorovski 69'; Musso (yellow card) 76'; Becão (yellow card) 81'	Stadium: Stadio Olimpico Grande Torino; Attendance: 0 Referee: Davide Massa

17 December 2020 12	Roma	3–1	Torino	Rome
20:45 CET (UTC+1)	Peres (yellow card) 21'; Mancini (yellow card) 23'; Mkhitaryan 27'; Veretout 43' (pen.); Villar (yellow card) 56'; Pellegrini 68'; Calafiori (yellow card) 90+2'	Report	Singo (yellow card) 7' (yellow-red card) 14'; Belotti 73'; Lyanco (yellow card) 78'	Stadium: Stadio Olimpico; Attendance: 0 Referee: Rosario Abisso

20 December 2020 13	Torino	1–1	Bologna	Turin
12:30 CET (UTC+1)	Lyanco (yellow card) 32'; Verdi 69'	Report	Domínguez (yellow card) 26'; Svanberg (yellow card) 52'; Tomiyasu (yellow card) 68'; Soriano 78'	Stadium: Stadio Olimpico Grande Torino; Attendance: 0 Referee: Fabrizio Pasqua

23 December 2020 14	Napoli	1–1	Torino	Naples
20:45 CET (UTC+1)	Bakayoko (yellow card) 63'; Elmas (yellow card) 87'; Insigne 90+2'; Di Lorenzo (yellow card) 90+6'	Report	Izzo (yellow card) 33', (goal) 56'; Buongiorno (yellow card) 40'; Linetty (yellow card) 76'	Stadium: Stadio San Paolo; Attendance: 0 Referee: Paolo Valeri

3 January 2021 15	Parma	0–3	Torino	Parma
15:00 CET (UTC+1)	Gagliolo (yellow card) 30'; Alves (yellow card) 87'	Report	Singo 8'; Verdi (yellow card) 32'; Izzo 88', (yellow card) 90'; Gojak 90+5'	Stadium: Stadio Ennio Tardini; Attendance: 0 Referee: Daniele Doveri

6 January 2021 16	Torino	1–1	Hellas Verona	Turin
15:00 CET (UTC+1)	Belotti (yellow card) 45+3'; Bremer 84'	Report	Faraoni (yellow card) 30'; Ceccherini (yellow card) 61'; Dimarco 67'; Barák (yellow card) 80'	Stadium: Stadio Olimpico Grande Torino; Attendance: 0 Referee: Marco Di Bello

9 January 2021 17	Milan	2–0	Torino	Milan
20:45 CET (UTC+1)	Leão 25', (yellow card) 80'; Kessié 36' (pen.); Brahim (yellow card) 38'; Romagnoli (yellow card) 41'; Tonali (yellow card) 45+2'; Dalot (yellow card) 65'; Calabria (yellow card) 85'	Report	Rincón (yellow card) 26'; Segre (yellow card) 90+2'	Stadium: San Siro; Attendance: 0 Referee: Fabio Maresca

16 January 2021 18	Torino	0–0	Spezia	Turin
18:00 CET (UTC+1)	Buongiorno (yellow card) 34'; Lyanco (yellow card) 61'; Linetty (yellow card) 89'	Report	Vignali (red card) 8'; Pobega (yellow card) 17'; Verde (yellow card) 59'; Marchizza (yellow card) 76'; Gyasi (yellow card) 84'	Stadium: Stadio Olimpico Grande Torino; Attendance: 0 Referee: Michael Fabbri

22 January 2021 19	Benevento	2–2	Torino	Benevento
20:45 CET (UTC+1)	Viola 31' (pen.); Lapadula 49'; Glik (yellow card) 90+5'	Report	Linetty (yellow card) 37'; Zaza (yellow card) 45+2', (goal) 51', 90+3'; Baselli (yellow card) 90+1'	Stadium: Stadio Ciro Vigorito; Attendance: 0 Referee: Piero Giacomelli

29 January 2021 20	Torino	1–1	Fiorentina	Turin
20:45 CET (UTC+1)	Lyanco (yellow card) 37'; Belotti (yellow card) 71', (goal) 88'	Report	Castrovilli (red card) 61'; Ribéry 67'; Milenković (red card) 71'; Kouamé (yellow card) 84'; Amrabat (yellow card) 90+2'	Stadium: Stadio Olimpico Grande Torino; Attendance: 0 Referee: Marco Di Bello

6 February 2021 21	Atalanta	3–3	Torino	Bergamo
15:00 CET (UTC+1)	Iličić 14'; Gosens 19'; Muriel 21'; Palomino (yellow card) 41'; Pašalić (yellow card) 86'; Toloi (yellow card) 87'	Report	Zaza (yellow card) 24'; Nkoulou (yellow card) 27'; Belotti (penalty missed) 42', 42'; Bremer 45+1'; Bonazzoli 84'	Stadium: Gewiss Stadium; Attendance: 0 Referee: Francesco Fourneau

13 February 2021 22	Torino	0–0	Genoa	Turin
15:00 CET (UTC+1)	Bremer (yellow card) 79'; Izzo (yellow card) 84'	Report	Criscito (yellow card) 10'; Rovella (yellow card) 38'; Goldaniga (yellow card) 60'; Radovanović (yellow card) 90+1'	Stadium: Stadio Olimpico Grande Torino; Attendance: 0 Referee: Fabrizio Pasqua

19 February 2021 23	Cagliari	0–1	Torino	Cagliari
20:45 CET (UTC+1)	Simeone (yellow card) 64'; Ceppitelli (yellow card) 72'; Zappa (yellow card) 88'	Report	Lukić (yellow card) 26'; Belotti (yellow card) 50'; Bremer 76'	Stadium: Sardegna Arena; Attendance: 0 Referee: Daniele Orsato

7 March 2021 26	Crotone	4–2	Torino	Crotone
15:00 CET (UTC+1)	Simy 27' (pen.), 54'; Petriccione (yellow card) 44'; Cordaz (yellow card) 45+1'; Reca 80'; Zanellato (yellow card) 83'; Ounas (yellow card) 90+3', (goal) 90+4'	Report	Mandragora 45'; Rincón (yellow card) 79' (yellow-red card) 90+3'; Sanabria 84'	Stadium: Stadio Ezio Scida; Attendance: 0 Referee: Marco Guida

14 March 2021 27	Torino	1–2	Internazionale	Turin
15:00 CET (UTC+1)	Sanabria 70'	Report	Gagliardini (yellow card) 53'; Lukaku 62' (pen.); Martínez 85'	Stadium: Stadio Olimpico Grande Torino; Attendance: 0 Referee: Paolo Valeri

17 March 2021 24	Torino	3–2	Sassuolo	Turin
15:00 CET (UTC+1)	Sanabria (yellow card) 72'; Zaza 77', 90+2'; Mandragora 87'	Report	Berardi 6', 38'; Defrel (yellow card) 60'; Toljan (yellow card) 78'	Stadium: Stadio Olimpico Grande Torino; Attendance: 0 Referee: Maurizio Mariani
Note: The match was originally scheduled for 26 February 2021, but was postponed after eight Torino players tested positive for COVID-19 amid its pandemic in Italy.

21 March 2021 28	Sampdoria	1–0	Torino	Genoa
15:00 CET (UTC+1)	Candreva 25'	Report	Lyanco (yellow card) 90+5'	Stadium: Stadio Luigi Ferraris; Attendance: 0 Referee: Daniele Orsato

3 April 2021 29	Torino	2–2	Juventus	Turin
18:00 CEST (UTC+2)	Sanabria 27', 46', (yellow card) 83'; Ansaldi (yellow card) 42'; Rincón (yellow card) 59'; Mandragora (yellow card) 88'	Report	Chiesa 13'; Cuadrado (yellow card) 68'; Ronaldo 79'; Bernardeschi (yellow card) 90+2'	Stadium: Stadio Olimpico Grande Torino; Attendance: 0 Referee: Michael Fabbri

10 April 2021 30	Udinese	0–1	Torino	Udine
20:45 CEST (UTC+2)		Report	Mandragora (yellow card) 40'; Buongiorno (yellow card) 49'; Belotti 61' (pen.); Zaza (yellow card) 90+2'	Stadium: Stadio Friuli; Attendance: 0 Referee: Daniele Doveri

18 April 2021 31	Torino	3–1	Roma	Turin
18:00 CEST (UTC+2)	Nkoulou (yellow card) 51'; Sanabria 57'; Verdi (yellow card) 65'; Zaza 71'; Rincón 90+2'	Report	Mayoral 3'; Diawara (yellow card) 75' (yellow-red card) 85'	Stadium: Stadio Olimpico Grande Torino; Attendance: 0 Referee: Davide Massa

21 April 2021 32	Bologna	1–1	Torino	Bologna
20:45 CEST (UTC+2)	Barrow 25'; Baldursson (yellow card) 28'; Poli (yellow card) 51'; Mbaye (yellow card) 53'; Danilo (yellow card) 81'	Report	Nkoulou (yellow card) 18'; Rincón (yellow card) 45+2'; Mandragora 58'	Stadium: Stadio Renato Dall'Ara; Attendance: 0 Referee: Valerio Marini

26 April 2021 33	Torino	0–2	Napoli	Turin
18:30 CEST (UTC+2)	Verdi (yellow card) 45+1'; Mandragora (yellow card) 58' (yellow-red card) 86'	Report	Bakayoko 11'; Osimhen 13', (yellow card) 68'	Stadium: Stadio Olimpico Grande Torino; Attendance: 0 Referee: Paolo Valeri

3 May 2021 34	Torino	1–0	Parma	Turin
20:45 CEST (UTC+2)	Vojvoda 63'	Report	Dierckx (yellow card) 10'; Hernani (yellow card) 65'; Kucka (yellow card) 72'	Stadium: Stadio Olimpico Grande Torino; Attendance: 0 Referee: Gianluca Aureliano

9 May 2021 35	Hellas Verona	1–1	Torino	Verona
15:00 CEST (UTC+2)	Dawidowicz (yellow card) 34'; Günter (yellow card) 83'; Dimarco 88'; Kalinić (yellow card) 89'	Report	Nkoulou (yellow card) 38'; Vojvoda 85', (yellow card) 87'; Mandragora (yellow card) 90+5'	Stadium: Stadio Marcantonio Bentegodi; Attendance: 0 Referee: Davide Massa

12 May 2021 36	Torino	0–7	Milan	Turin
20:45 CEST (UTC+2)	Baselli (yellow card) 44'; Linetty (yellow card) 48'	Report	Hernandez 19', 62'; Kessié 26' (pen.); Bennacer (yellow card) 41'; Brahim 50'; Rebić 67', 72', 79'	Stadium: Stadio Olimpico Grande Torino; Attendance: 0 Referee: Marco Guida

15 May 2021 37	Spezia	4–1	Torino	La Spezia
15:00 CEST (UTC+2)	Saponara 19'; Agudelo (yellow card) 28'; Pobega (yellow card) 33'; Nzola 41' (pen.), 74'; Farias (yellow card) 80'; Erlić 84'	Report	Vojvoda (yellow card) 32'; Belotti 54' (pen.); Rincón (yellow card) 57'; Buongiorno (yellow card) 78'; Bremer (yellow card) 83'; Verdi (yellow card) 90+1'	Stadium: Stadio Alberto Picco; Attendance: 0 Referee: Daniele Orsato

18 May 2021 25	Lazio	0–0	Torino	Rome
20:30 CEST (UTC+2)	Strakosha (yellow card) 28'; Luis Alberto (yellow card) 50'; Luiz Felipe (yellow card) 61'; Pereira (yellow card) 81'; Immobile (penalty missed) 84'	Report		Stadium: Stadio Olimpico; Attendance: 0 Referee: Michael Fabbri
Note: The match was originally scheduled for 2 March 2021, but was abandoned after Torino were banned from travelling to Rome, as they were under a quarantine order from the Turin health authority after eight Torino players tested positive for COVID-19 amid its pandemic in Italy. On 24 April, the match was rescheduled to 18 May 2021.

23 May 2021 38	Torino	1–1	Benevento	Turin
20:45 CEST (UTC+2)	Bremer 29'	Report	Tello 72'; Hetemaj (yellow card) 78'; Pastina (yellow card) 90'	Stadium: Stadio Olimpico Grande Torino; Attendance: 0 Referee: Marco Di Bello

=== Coppa Italia ===
28 October 2020 Third round	Torino	3–1 (a.e.t.)	Lecce	Turin
14:00 CET (UTC+1)	Lyanco 39'; Gojack (yellow card) 90+3'; Verdi 109' (pen.), 112', (yellow card) 112'	Report	Stępiński 22'; Björkengren (yellow card) 65'; Henderson (yellow card) 90+2'; Maselli (yellow card) 105'	Stadium: Stadio Olimpico Grande Torino; Referee: Marco Piccinini

26 November 2020 Fourth round	Torino	2–0	Virtus Entella	Turin
14:00 CET (UTC+1)	Zaza 28'; Bonazzoli 30'	Report	Toscano (yellow card) 14'; Crimi (yellow card) 27'	Stadium: Stadio Olimpico Grande Torino; Referee: Daniele Paterna

12 January 2021 Round of 16	Milan	0–0 (a.e.t.) (5–4 p)	Torino	Milan
20:45 CET (UTC+1)	G. Donnarumma (yellow card) 72', (red card) 73'; Tonali (yellow card) 85'; Kessié (yellow card) 112'	Report	Rincón (yellow card) 27'; Linetty (yellow card) 29'; Zaza (yellow card) 46'; Lukić (yellow card) 101'; Lyanco (yellow card) 115'; Gojak (yellow card) 118'	Stadium: San Siro; Referee: Paolo Valeri
	Penalties
	Kessié (penalty scored); Hernandez (penalty scored); Tonali (penalty scored); Romagnoli (penalty scored); Çalhanoğlu (penalty scored)		(penalty scored) Belotti; (penalty scored) Lukić; (penalty scored) Lyanco; (penalty missed) Rincón; (penalty scored) Milinković-Savić
Note: G. Donnarumma was sent off for dissent while a substitute.

== Statistics ==
=== Appearances and goals ===
No.	Pos	Nat	Player	Total		Serie A		Coppa Italia	
No.	Pos	Nat	Player	Apps	Goals	Apps	Goals	Apps	Goals
Goalkeepers
18	GK	(Kosovo) KOS	Samir Ujkani	1	0	1	0	0	0
32	GK	(Serbia) SRB	Vanja Milinković-Savić	8	0	5	0	3	0
39	GK	(Italy) ITA	Salvatore Sirigu	32	0	32	0	0	0
Defenders
3	DF	(Brazil) BRA	Bremer	35	5	33	5	1+1	0
4	DF	(Brazil) BRA	Lyanco	25	1	21+2	0	1+1	1
5	DF	(Italy) ITA	Armando Izzo	26	2	24+1	2	1	0
13	DF	(Switzerland) SUI	Ricardo Rodríguez	18	0	15+1	0	1+1	0
15	DF	(Argentina) ARG	Cristian Ansaldi	34	1	20+11	1	2+1	0
17	DF	(Ivory Coast) CIV	Wilfried Singo	30	1	20+8	1	1+1	0
27	DF	(Kosovo) KOS	Mërgim Vojvoda	25	2	17+7	2	1	0
29	DF	(Italy) ITA	Nicola Murru	17	0	7+7	0	2+1	0
33	DF	(Cameroon) CMR	Nicolas Nkoulou	20	1	16+2	1	2	0
45	DF	(Ecuador) ECU	Erick Ferigra	0	0	0	0	0	0
99	DF	(Italy) ITA	Alessandro Buongiorno	14	0	9+3	0	2	0
Midfielders
7	MF	(Serbia) SRB	Saša Lukić	34	3	24+8	3	0+2	0
8	MF	(Italy) ITA	Daniele Baselli	15	0	3+12	0	0	0
10	MF	(Bosnia and Herzegovina) BIH	Amer Gojak	17	1	6+9	1	2	0
38	MF	(Italy) ITA	Rolando Mandragora	17	3	17	3	0	0
77	MF	(Poland) POL	Karol Linetty	30	1	20+7	1	3	0
88	MF	(Venezuela) VEN	Tomás Rincón	39	1	33+3	1	1+2	0
Forwards
9	FW	(Italy) ITA	Andrea Belotti	36	13	33+2	13	0+1	0
11	FW	(Italy) ITA	Simone Zaza	31	7	15+14	6	2	1
19	FW	(Paraguay) PAR	Antonio Sanabria	14	5	12+2	5	0	0
24	FW	(Italy) ITA	Simone Verdi	34	3	17+16	1	1	2
26	FW	(Italy) ITA	Federico Bonazzoli	22	3	4+16	2	2	1
Players transferred out during the season
6	MF	(Italy) ITA	Jacopo Segre	12	0	1+8	0	3	0
20	FW	(Italy) ITA	Simone Edera	4	0	0+2	0	1+1	0
22	FW	(Italy) ITA	Vincenzo Millico	4	0	0+3	0	0+1	0
23	MF	(France) FRA	Soualiho Meïté	16	1	11+3	1	1+1	0
25	GK	(Italy) ITA	Antonio Rosati	0	0	0	0	0	0
80	MF	(France) FRA	Ndary Adopo	0	0	0	0	0	0

Last updated: 23 May 2021
Source: Competitions

=== Goalscorers ===
As of 26 November 2020

Rank	No.	Pos	Nat	Name	Serie A	Coppa Italia	Total
1	9	FW	(Italy)	Andrea Belotti	6	0	6
2	7	MF	(Serbia)	Saša Lukić	3	0	3
3	11	FW	(Italy)	Simone Zaza	1	1	2
3	24	FW	(Italy)	Simone Verdi	0	2	2
5	3	DF	(Brazil)	Bremer	1	0	1
5	4	DF	(Brazil)	Lyanco	0	1	1
5	15	DF	(Argentina)	Cristian Ansaldi	1	0	1
5	77	MF	(Poland)	Karol Linetty	1	0	1
5	26	FW	(Italy)	Federico Bonazzoli	0	1	1
Own goal					1	0	1
Totals					14	5	19
