= 2018–19 Torino FC season =

Torino
2018–19 season
- President: Urbano Cairo
- Manager: Walter Mazzarri
- Stadium: Stadio Olimpico Grande Torino
- Serie A: 7th
- Coppa Italia: Round of 16
- Top goalscorer: League: Andrea Belotti (15); All: Andrea Belotti (17)
- Highest home attendance: 26,588 vs Juventus (15 December 2018, Serie A)
- Lowest home attendance: 3,339 vs Südtirol (6 December 2018, Coppa Italia)
- Average home league attendance: 21,385
Home colours	Away colours	Third colours

The 2018–19 season was Torino Football Club's 108th season of competitive football, 91st season in the top division of Italian football and 74th season in Serie A. The club competed in Serie A and in the Coppa Italia.

The season was coach Walter Mazzarri's first full campaign in charge of Torino, after replacing Siniša Mihajlović following his sacking during the 2017–18 season.

== Players ==
=== Squad information ===
Last updated on 26 May 2019
Appearances include league matches only

No.	Name	Nat	Position(s)	Date of birth (age)	Signed from	Signed in	Contract ends	Apps.	Goals
Goalkeepers
1	Salvador Ichazo	(Uruguay)	GK	26 January 1992 (aged 27)	(Uruguay) Danubio	2015	2019	7	0
25	Antonio Rosati	(Italy)	GK	26 June 1983 (aged 36)	(Italy) Perugia	2018	2019	0	0
39	Salvatore Sirigu	(Italy)	GK	12 January 1987 (aged 32)	(France) Paris Saint-Germain	2017	2022	73	0
Defenders
5	Armando Izzo	(Italy)	CB / RB	2 March 1992 (aged 27)	(Italy) Genoa	2018	2022	37	4
15	Cristian Ansaldi	(Argentina)	LB / RB	20 September 1986 (aged 32)	(Italy) Internazionale	2017	2021	49	4
24	Emiliano Moretti	(Italy)	CB	11 June 1981 (aged 38)	(Italy) Genoa	2013	2018	175	5
29	Lorenzo De Silvestri	(Italy)	RB	23 May 1988 (aged 31)	(Italy) Sampdoria	2016	2020	83	8
30	Koffi Djidji	(Ivory Coast)	CB	30 November 1992 (aged 26)	(France) Nantes	2018	2019	17	0
33	Nicolas Nkoulou	(Cameroon)	CB	27 March 1990 (aged 29)	(France) Lyon	2017	2018	73	4
34	Ola Aina	(Nigeria)	RB / LB / RM	8 October 1996 (aged 22)	(England) Chelsea	2018	2019	30	1
36	Bremer	(Brazil)	CB	18 March 1997 (aged 22)	(Brazil) Atlético Mineiro	2018	2023	5	0
99	Erick Ferigra	(Ecuador)	CB	7 February 1999 (aged 20)	(Italy) Youth Sector	2018	2021	0	0
Midfielders
7	Saša Lukić	(Serbia)	CM / DM	13 August 1996 (aged 22)	(Serbia) Partizan	2016	2023	38	0
8	Daniele Baselli	(Italy)	CM / AM	12 March 1992 (aged 27)	(Italy) Atalanta	2015	2022	138	18
23	Soualiho Meïté	(France)	DM / CM	17 March 1994 (aged 25)	(France) Monaco	2018	2023	35	2
88	Tomás Rincón	(Venezuela)	DM / CM	13 January 1988 (aged 31)	(Italy) Juventus	2017	2018	70	4
Forwards
9	Andrea Belotti	(Italy)	CF	20 December 1993 (aged 25)	(Italy) Palermo	2015	2021	139	63
11	Simone Zaza	(Italy)	CF	25 June 1991 (aged 28)	(Spain) Valencia	2018	2023	29	4
14	Iago Falque	(Spain)	LW / RW / SS	4 January 1990 (aged 29)	(Italy) Roma	2016	2020	98	30
19	Vitalie Damașcan	(Moldova)	CF	24 January 1999 (aged 20)	(Italy) Roma	2018	2021	1	0
21	Álex Berenguer	(Spain)	LW	4 July 1995 (aged 23)	(Spain) Osasuna	2017	2022	53	3
27	Vittorio Parigini	(Italy)	RW / LW / AM	25 March 1996 (aged 23)	(Italy) Youth Sector	2013	2020	17	0
72	Vincenzo Millico	(Italy)	SS / LW / RW	12 August 2000 (aged 18)	(Italy) Youth Sector	2019		1	0
Players transferred during the season
3	Lyanco	(Brazil)	CB	1 February 1997 (aged 22)	(Brazil) São Paulo	2017	2022	6	0
6	Roberto Soriano	(Italy)	LW / CM / AM	8 February 1991 (aged 28)	(Spain) Villarreal	2018	2019	11	0
10	Adem Ljajić	(Serbia)	LW / RW / SS / AM	29 September 1991 (aged 27)	(Italy) Roma	2016	2020	61	16
11	M'Baye Niang	(Senegal)	LW / RW / SS / CF	19 December 1994 (aged 24)	(Italy) Milan	2017	2021	26	4
20	Simone Edera	(Italy)	RW	9 January 1997 (aged 22)	(Italy) Youth Sector	2016	2021	18	1

== Transfers ==
=== In ===
Date	Pos.	Player	Age	Moving from	Fee	Notes	Source
1 July 2018	DF	(Albania) Arlind Ajeti	24	(Italy) Crotone	Free	Loan return	
1 July 2018	MF	(Italy) Mattia Aramu	23	(Italy) Virtus Entella	Free	Loan return	
1 July 2018	DF	(Brazil) Danilo Fernando Avelar	29	(France) Amiens	Free	Loan return	
1 July 2018	FW	(Argentina) Lucas Boyé	22	(Spain) Celta Vigo	Free	Loan return	
1 July 2018	MF	(Sweden) Samuel Gustafson	23	(Italy) Perugia	Free	Loan return	
1 July 2018	MF	(Serbia) Saša Lukić	21	(Spain) Levante	Free	Loan return	
1 July 2018	FW	(Italy) Vittorio Parigini	22	(Italy) Benevento	Free	Loan return	
1 July 2018	GK	(Italy) Andrea Zaccagno	21	(Italy) Pistoiese	Free	Loan return	
4 July 2018	DF	(Italy) Armando Izzo	26	(Italy) Genoa	€8M	€8M + €2M in bonuses	
10 July 2018	DF	(Brazil) Bremer	21	(Brazil) Atlético Mineiro	€5.8M		
10 July 2018	MF	(France) Soualiho Meïté	24	(France) Monaco	Free	Part of Antonio Barreca transfer	
12 July 2018	GK	(Italy) Antonio Rosati	35	(Italy) Perugia	Free		

==== Loans in ====
Date	Pos.	Player	Age	Moving from	Fee	Notes	Source
14 August 2018	DF	(Nigeria) Ola Aina	21	(England) Chelsea	Loan	Loan with an option to buy for €8M	
17 August 2018	DF	(Ivory Coast) Koffi Djidji	25	(France) Nantes	Loan	Loan with an option to buy	
17 August 2018	MF	(Italy) Roberto Soriano	27	(Spain) Villarreal	€1M	€1M loan with an option to buy for €14M	
17 August 2018	FW	(Italy) Simone Zaza	27	(Spain) Valencia	€2M	€2M loan with an obligation to buy for €12M	

=== Out ===
Date	Pos.	Player	Age	Moving to	Fee	Notes	Source
20 June 2018	GK	(Senegal) Alfred Gomis	24	(Italy) SPAL	Undisclosed	Option to buy exercised	
1 July 2018	DF	(Argentina) Nicolás Burdisso	37	Unattached	Free	End of contract	
1 July 2018	DF	(Italy) Cristian Molinaro	34	(Italy) Frosinone	Free	End of contract	
10 July 2018	DF	(Italy) Antonio Barreca	23	(France) Monaco	€2M	€2M + Soualiho Meïté	
11 August 2018	MF	(Nigeria) Joel Obi	27	(Italy) Chievo	Undisclosed		
16 August 2018	MF	(Italy) Mirko Valdifiori	32	(Italy) SPAL	Undisclosed		
17 August 2018	MF	(Ghana) Afriyie Acquah	26	(Italy) Empoli	€900,000		
4 January 2019	MF	(Italy) Roberto Soriano	27	(Spain) Villarreal	Free	Loan return	

==== Loans out ====
Date	Pos.	Player	Age	Moving to	Fee	Notes	Source
30 June 2018	DF	(Brazil) Danilo Fernando Avelar	29	(Brazil) Corinthians	Loan	Loan with an option to buy	
4 July 2018	GK	(Serbia) Vanja Milinković-Savić	21	(Italy) SPAL	Loan		
7 July 2018	MF	(Sweden) Samuel Gustafson	23	(Italy) Hellas Verona	Loan		
16 August 2018	DF	(Italy) Kevin Bonifazi	22	(Italy) SPAL	Loan	Loan with an option to buy and counter-option	
31 August 2018	FW	(Serbia) Adem Ljajić	26	(Turkey) Beşiktaş	Loan	Loan with an obligation to buy	

== Competitions ==
=== Serie A ===
==== League table ====
Pos	Team	Pld	W	D	L	GF	GA	GD	Pts	Qualification or relegation
5	Milan (Note: Milan were excluded from UEFA competitions over financial fair play violation.)	38	19	11	8	55	36	+19	68	
6	Roma	38	18	12	8	66	48	+18	66	Qualification for the Europa League group stage
7	Torino	38	16	15	7	52	37	+15	63	Qualification for the Europa League second qualifying round
8	Lazio	38	17	8	13	56	46	+10	57 (Note: Lazio were deducted 2 points by the Italian Football Federation.)	Qualification for the Europa League group stage (Note: Lazio qualified for the Europa League group stage by winning the 2018–19 Coppa Italia)
9	Sampdoria	38	15	8	15	60	51	+9	53	

Source: Serie A, Soccerway
Rules for classification: 1) Points; 2) Head-to-head points; 3) Head-to-head goal difference; 4) Goal difference; 5) Goals scored; 6) Draw. (Note: Head-to-head record is used only after all the matches between the teams in question have been played).

==== Results summary ====
Overall								Home						Away					
Pld	W	D	L	GF	GA	GD	Pts	W	D	L	GF	GA	GD	W	D	L	GF	GA	GD
38	16	15	7	52	37	+15	63	12	2	5	32	19	+13	4	13	2	20	18	+2

Last updated: 26 May 2019.
Source: Competitive matches

==== Results by round ====
Round	1	2	3	4	5	6	7	8	9	10	11	12	13	14	15	16	17	18	19	20	21	22	23	24	25	26	27	28	29	30	31	32	33	34	35	36	37	38
Ground	H	A	H	A	H	A	A	H	A	H	A	H	A	H	A	H	A	H	A	A	H	A	H	A	H	H	A	H	A	H	A	H	A	H	A	H	A	H
Result	L	D	W	D	L	D	W	W	D	D	W	L	D	W	D	L	D	W	D	L	W	D	W	D	W	W	W	L	D	W	D	D	W	W	D	W	L	W
Position	18	13	10	10	15	15	12	12	10	11	7	10	11	6	6	11	11	8	9	11	10	10	8	9	7	8	6	8	9	7	8	7	7	7	7	7	7	7

Updated to match(es) played on 26 May 2019. Source: Competitive matches
A = Away; H = Home; W = Win; D = Draw; L = Loss

==== Matches ====
19 August 2018 1	Torino	0–1	Roma	Turin
18:00 CEST (UTC+02:00)	Falque (yellow card) 57'	Report	Fazio (yellow card) 30'; Florenzi (yellow card) 84'; Džeko 89', (yellow card) 90'	Stadium: Stadio Olimpico Grande Torino; Attendance: 19,558; Referee: Marco Di Bello

26 August 2018 2	Internazionale	2–2	Torino	Milan
20:30 CEST (UTC+02:00)	Perišić 7'; De Vrij 32', (yellow card) 44'	Report	Meïté (yellow card) 33', (goal) 68'; Moretti (yellow card) 36'; Belotti 56'	Stadium: San Siro; Attendance: 59,135; Referee: Paolo Mazzoleni

2 September 2018 3	Torino	1–0	SPAL	Turin
20:30 CEST (UTC+02:00)	Nkoulou 52'; Moretti (yellow card) 55'	Report	Schiattarella (yellow card) 27'; Cionek (yellow card) 71'	Stadium: Stadio Olimpico Grande Torino; Attendance: 17,785; Referee: Fabrizio Pasqua

16 September 2018 4	Udinese	1–1	Torino	Udine
15:00 CEST (UTC+02:00)	De Paul 28'; Fofana (yellow card) 54'; Machís (yellow card) 89'	Report	Zaza (yellow card) 38'; Soriano (yellow card) 43'; Meïté 49'	Stadium: Dacia Arena; Attendance: 18,813; Referee: Paolo Valeri

23 September 2018 5	Torino	1–3	Napoli	Turin
12:30 CEST (UTC+02:00)	Rincón (yellow card) 31'; Izzo (yellow card) 42'; Belotti 51' (pen.)	Report	Insigne 4', 59'; Verdi 20'; Koulibaly (yellow card) 23'; Rog (yellow card) 37'; Albiol (yellow card) 52'	Stadium: Stadio Olimpico Grande Torino; Attendance: 22,655; Referee: Massimiliano Irrati

26 September 2018 6	Atalanta	0–0	Torino	Bergamo
20:30 CEST (UTC+02:00)	Palomino (yellow card) 48'; Tumminello (yellow card) 88'	Report	Meïté (yellow card) 31'	Stadium: Stadio Atleti Azzurri d'Italia; Attendance: 18,144; Referee: Daniele Orsato

30 September 2018 7	Chievo	0–1	Torino	Verona
15:00 CEST (UTC+02:00)	Rossettini (yellow card) 41'; Radovanović (yellow card) 57'; Stępiński (yellow card) 71'	Report	Nkoulou (yellow card) 6'; Aina (yellow card) 61'; Rincón (yellow card) 70'; Zaza 88'	Stadium: Stadio Marc'Antonio Bentegodi; Attendance: 10,500; Referee: Marco Guida

5 October 2018 8	Torino	3–2	Frosinone	Turin
20:30 CEST (UTC+02:00)	Rincón 20'; Baselli 46'; Sirigu (yellow card) 59'; Izzo (yellow card) 69'; Berenguer 71'; Meïté (yellow card) 80'	Report	Ciano (yellow card) 11', (goal) 64'; Hallfreðsson (yellow card) 53'; Goldaniga 58'; Krajnc (yellow card) 60'	Stadium: Stadio Olimpico Grande Torino; Attendance: 16,554; Referee: Ivano Pezzuto

21 October 2018 9	Bologna	2–2	Torino	Bologna
15:00 CEST (UTC+02:00)	Calabresi (yellow card) 39', (goal) 77'; Santander 59'; Mbaye (yellow card) 64'	Report	Falque 14'; Belotti (yellow card) 27'; Baselli 54', (yellow card) 61'	Stadium: Stadio Renato Dall'Ara; Attendance: 23,245; Referee: Luca Banti

27 October 2018 10	Torino	1–1	Fiorentina	Turin
20:30 CEST (UTC+02:00)	Lafont 13' (o.g.); Rincón (yellow card) 25'; Meïté (yellow card) 70'	Report	Benassi 2'; Milenković (yellow card) 6'; Gerson (yellow card) 67'; Mirallas (yellow card) 77'; Veretout (yellow card) 82'	Stadium: Stadio Olimpico Grande Torino; Attendance: 17,871; Referee: Michael Fabbri

4 November 2018 11	Sampdoria	1–4	Torino	Genoa
15:00 CET (UTC+01:00)	Praet (yellow card) 11'; Ekdal (yellow card) 40'; Quagliarella 65'	Report	Belotti 12', 43' (pen.); Rincón (yellow card) 32'; Meïté (yellow card) 51'; Falque 56'; Izzo 78'	Stadium: Stadio Luigi Ferraris; Attendance: 20,364; Referee: Gianluca Rocchi

10 November 2018 12	Torino	1–2	Parma	Turin
15:00 CET (UTC+01:00)	Baselli 37'; Rincón (yellow card) 82'; De Silvestri (yellow card) 86'	Report	Gervinho 9'; Inglese 25'; Barillà (yellow card) 27'; Sepe (yellow card) 45'; Gagliolo (yellow card) 85'; Deiola (yellow card) 89'	Stadium: Stadio Olimpico Grande Torino; Attendance: 17,431; Referee: Davide Massa

26 November 2018 13	Cagliari	0–0	Torino	Cagliari
20:30 CET (UTC+01:00)	João Pedro (yellow card) 64'; Ceppitelli (yellow card) 77'	Report		Stadium: Sardegna Arena; Attendance: 15,804; Referee: Fabrizio Pasqua

2 December 2018 14	Torino	2–1	Genoa	Turin
15:00 CET (UTC+01:00)	Ansaldi 45+2'; Belotti 45+5' (pen.); Meïté (yellow card) 65'; Nkoulou (yellow card) 76'; Zaza (yellow card) 88'	Report	Rômulo (yellow card) 25' (yellow-red card) 28'; Kouamé 36'; Biraschi (yellow card) 76'; Bessa (yellow card) 86'	Stadium: Stadio Olimpico Grande Torino; Attendance: 15,324; Referee: Maurizio Mariani

9 December 2018 15	Milan	0–0	Torino	Milan
20:30 CET (UTC+01:00)	Abate (yellow card) 8'; Zapata (yellow card) 39'	Report	Nkoulou (yellow card) 16'; Izzo (yellow card) 35'; Baselli (yellow card) 70'	Stadium: San Siro; Attendance: 44,572; Referee: Daniele Orsato

15 December 2018 16	Torino	0–1	Juventus	Turin
20:30 CET (UTC+01:00)	Zaza (yellow card) 27'; Ansaldi (yellow card) 72'	Report	Pjanić (yellow card) 48'; Can (yellow card) 51'; Ronaldo 70' (pen.), (yellow card) 70'; Perin (yellow card) 90+2'	Stadium: Stadio Olimpico Grande Torino; Attendance: 26,588; Referee: Marco Guida

22 December 2018 17	Sassuolo	1–1	Torino	Reggio Emilia
15:00 CET (UTC+01:00)	Rogério (yellow card) 63'; Brignola 90+2', (yellow card) 90+8'	Report	Rincón (yellow card) 45'; Belotti 55'; Izzo (yellow card) 76'; Lukić (yellow card) 90'	Stadium: Mapei Stadium – Città del Tricolore; Attendance: 11,148; Referee: Luca Banti

26 December 2018 18	Torino	3–0	Empoli	Turin
18:00 CET (UTC+01:00)	Rincón (yellow card) 19'; Nkoulou 44'; De Silvestri 49'; Falque 75'	Report	Veseli (yellow card) 42'; Silvestre (yellow card) 56'; Di Lorenzo (yellow card) 71'; Krunić (red card) 89'	Stadium: Stadio Olimpico Grande Torino; Attendance: 20,047; Referee: Fabio Maresca

29 December 2018 19	Lazio	1–1	Torino	Rome
15:00 CET (UTC+01:00)	Correa (yellow card) 27'; Luiz Felipe (yellow card) 57'; Milinković-Savić 62'; Luis Alberto (yellow card) 75'; Marušić (red card) 86'; Lucas (yellow card) 90+1'	Report	Djidji (yellow card) 14'; Izzo (yellow card) 41'; Belotti 45+3' (pen.); Lukić (yellow card) 80'; Rincón (yellow card) 90'; Meïté (red card) 90'	Stadium: Stadio Olimpico; Attendance: 35,000; Referee: Massimiliano Irrati

19 January 2019 20	Roma	3–2	Torino	Rome
15:00 CET (UTC+01:00)	Zaniolo 15'; Kolarov 34' (pen.); Kluivert (yellow card) 61'; Cristante (yellow card) 66'; El Shaarawy 73'	Report	Rincón 51', (yellow card) 90+1'; Ansaldi 67'; Lyanco (yellow card) 70'; Belotti (yellow card) 90+2'	Stadium: Stadio Olimpico; Attendance: 32,978; Referee: Piero Giacomelli

27 January 2019 21	Torino	1–0	Internazionale	Turin
18:00 CET (UTC+01:00)	Izzo 35'; Belotti (yellow card) 40'; Aina (yellow card) 76'; Zaza (yellow card) 84'	Report	De Vrij (yellow card) 31'; Dalbert (yellow card) 45+2'; D'Ambrosio (yellow card) 55'; Politano (red card) 86'	Stadium: Stadio Olimpico Grande Torino; Attendance: 22,002; Referee: Fabio Maresca

3 February 2019 22	SPAL	0–0	Torino	Ferrara
12:30 CET (UTC+01:00)	Missiroli (yellow card) 6'; Cionek (yellow card) 35'; Felipe (yellow card) 84'; Fares (yellow card) 90+2'; Kurtić (yellow card) 90+4'	Report	Ansaldi (yellow card) 2'; Nkoulou (yellow card) 33' (yellow-red card) 65'; Belotti (yellow card) 61'; Zaza (yellow card) 67'	Stadium: Stadio Paolo Mazza; Attendance: 12,743; Referee: Maurizio Mariani

10 February 2019 23	Torino	1–0	Udinese	Turin
15:00 CET (UTC+01:00)	Aina 31'; Lukić (yellow card) 36'; Djidji (yellow card) 74'	Report	De Paul (yellow card) 65'; De Maio (yellow card) 79' (yellow-red card) 90+8'; Troost-Ekong (yellow card) 86'	Stadium: Stadio Olimpico Grande Torino; Attendance: 16,557; Referee: Marco Guida

17 February 2019 24	Napoli	0–0	Torino	Naples
20:30 CET (UTC+01:00)	Insigne (yellow card) 45+3'; Koulibaly (yellow card) 60'; Allan (yellow card) 65'; Hysaj (yellow card) 82'; Malcuit (yellow card) 90+4'	Report	Rincón (yellow card) 45+2'; Moretti (yellow card) 59'; Aina (yellow card) 71'	Stadium: Stadio San Paolo; Attendance: 21,830; Referee: Michael Fabbri

23 February 2019 25	Torino	2–0	Atalanta	Turin
15:00 CET (UTC+01:00)	Izzo 42'; Falque 46'; Nkoulou (yellow card) 78'; Berenguer (yellow card) 90+4'	Report	Castagne (yellow card) 7'	Stadium: Stadio Olimpico Grande Torino; Attendance: 21,062; Referee: Daniele Orsato

3 March 2019 26	Torino	3–0	Chievo	Turin
12:30 CET (UTC+01:00)	Lukić (yellow card) 33'; Belotti 76'; Rincón 90+2'; Zaza 90+3'	Report	Dioussé (yellow card) 68'; Rigoni (yellow card) 73'; Bani (yellow card) 78'; Stępiński (yellow card) 86'	Stadium: Stadio Olimpico Grande Torino; Attendance: 25,269; Referee: Federico La Penna

10 March 2019 27	Frosinone	1–2	Torino	Frosinone
15:00 CET (UTC+01:00)	Capuano (yellow card) 22'; Paganini 42'; Ciano (yellow card) 71'	Report	Rincón (yellow card) 30'; Meïté (yellow card) 37'; Belotti 56', 78'; Zaza (yellow card) 82'; Aina (yellow card) 85'	Stadium: Stadio Benito Stirpe; Attendance: 14,165; Referee: Piero Giacomelli

16 March 2019 28	Torino	2–3	Bologna	Turin
20:30 CET (UTC+01:00)	Pulgar 6' (o.g.); Baselli (yellow card) 11'; Nkoulou (yellow card) 75'; Izzo 89'; Aina (yellow card) 90+2' (red card) 90+2'; Berenguer (yellow card) 90+5'	Report	Poli 29'; Pulgar 34' (pen.); Soriano (yellow card) 41'; Sansone (yellow card) 50'; Lyanco (yellow card) 56' (yellow-red card) 88'; Orsolini 64'	Stadium: Stadio Olimpico Grande Torino; Attendance: 24,863; Referee: Maurizio Mariani

31 March 2019 29	Fiorentina	1–1	Torino	Florence
15:00 CEST (UTC+02:00)	Simeone 7'	Report	Baselli 34', (yellow card) 44'; Zaza (yellow card) 85'	Stadium: Stadio Artemio Franchi; Attendance: 36,707; Referee: Fabrizio Pasqua

3 April 2019 30	Torino	2–1	Sampdoria	Turin
21:00 CEST (UTC+02:00)	Belotti 34', 45+1'; De Silvestri (yellow card) 61'; Rincón (yellow card) 86'; Lukić (yellow card) 90'	Report	Bereszyński (yellow card) 57'; Murru (yellow card) 76'; Gabbiadini 83', (yellow card) 90+1'	Stadium: Stadio Olimpico Grande Torino; Attendance: 22,618; Referee: Fabio Maresca

6 April 2019 31	Parma	0–0	Torino	Parma
15:00 CEST (UTC+02:00)	Gagliolo (yellow card) 22'; Gazzola (yellow card) 50'; Sierralta (yellow card) 77'; Kucka (yellow card) 90'	Report	Rincón (yellow card) 3'; Belotti (yellow card) 57'; Ansaldi (yellow card) 60'; Zaza (yellow card) 75'; Izzo (yellow card) 87'	Stadium: Stadio Ennio Tardini; Attendance: 16,924; Referee: Daniele Doveri

14 April 2019 32	Torino	1–1	Cagliari	Turin
12:30 CEST (UTC+02:00)	Rincón (yellow card) 2'; Berenguer (yellow card) 45'; Zaza 52', (red card) 73'	Report	Barella (yellow card) 1' (yellow-red card) 90+5'; Faragò (yellow card) 20'; Padoin (yellow card) 45+2'; Pellegrini (yellow card) 51' (yellow-red card) 82'; Pisacane (yellow card) 57'; Pavoletti 78'	Stadium: Stadio Olimpico Grande Torino; Attendance: 23,869; Referee: Massimiliano Irrati

20 April 2019 33	Genoa	0–1	Torino	Genoa
15:00 CEST (UTC+02:00)	Lerager (yellow card) 9'; Rolón (yellow card) 51'; Veloso (yellow card) 55'; Radovanović (yellow card) 89'	Report	Nkoulou (yellow card) 20'; Ansaldi 58'; Moretti (yellow card) 78'; Baselli (yellow card) 82'; Parigini (yellow card) 88'	Stadium: Stadio Luigi Ferraris; Attendance: 20,708; Referee: Daniele Doveri

28 April 2019 34	Torino	2–0	Milan	Turin
20:30 CEST (UTC+02:00)	Belotti 58' (pen.); Moretti (yellow card) 65'; Berenguer 69'; Parigini (yellow card) 83'	Report	Suso (yellow card) 8'; Conti (yellow card) 13'; Paquetá (yellow card) 16'; Romagnoli (yellow card) 77', (red card) 82'; G. Donnarumma (yellow card) 81'; Kessié (yellow card) 83'	Stadium: Stadio Olimpico Grande Torino; Attendance: 26,476; Referee: Marco Guida

3 May 2019 35	Juventus	1–1	Torino	Turin
20:30 CEST (UTC+02:00)	Matuidi (yellow card) 34'; Bonucci (yellow card) 71'; Bernardeschi (yellow card) 82'; Ronaldo 84'	Report	Lukić 18', (yellow card) 68'; Rincón (yellow card) 49'; Bremer (yellow card) 90+3'	Stadium: Allianz Stadium; Attendance: 38,530; Referee: Daniele Orsato

12 May 2019 36	Torino	3–2	Sassuolo	Turin
12:30 CEST (UTC+02:00)	Lukić (yellow card) 8'; Belotti 56', 82'; Zaza 81'	Report	Bourabia (yellow card) 12' (yellow-red card) 29', (goal) 27'; Ferrari (yellow card) 26'; Lirola 71'; Locatelli (yellow card) 87'; Demiral (yellow card) 90+4'	Stadium: Stadio Olimpico Grande Torino; Attendance: 25,360; Referee: Piero Giacomelli

19 May 2019 37	Empoli	4–1	Torino	Empoli
15:00 CEST (UTC+02:00)	Acquah 27'; Brighi 65'; Di Lorenzo 70'; Farias (yellow card) 71'; Caputo 89'	Report	Falque 56'; Berenguer (yellow card) 84'	Stadium: Stadio Carlo Castellani; Attendance: 10,344; Referee: Paolo Mazzoleni

26 May 2019 38	Torino	3–1	Lazio	Turin
15:00 CEST (UTC+02:00)	Falque 51'; Lukić 53'; De Silvestri 80'	Report	Immobile 66'; Capanni (yellow card) 83'	Stadium: Stadio Olimpico Grande Torino; Attendance: 24,428; Referee: Rosario Abisso

=== Coppa Italia ===
12 August 2018 Third round	Torino	4–0	Cosenza	Turin
20:45 CEST (UTC+02:00)	Baselli 9'; Belotti 28', 66'; Rincón 67'; Berenguer (yellow card) 69'	Report	Corsi (yellow card) 49'; Bearzotti (yellow card) 71'; Idda (yellow card) 88'	Stadium: Stadio Olimpico Grande Torino; Attendance: 6,348; Referee: Rosario Abisso

6 December 2018 Fourth round	Torino	2–0	Südtirol	Turin
20:45 CET (UTC+01:00)	Soriano 24', (yellow card) 66'; Edera 81'	Report	Costantino (yellow card) 43'	Stadium: Stadio Olimpico Grande Torino; Attendance: 3,339; Referee: Daniele Minelli

13 January 2019 Round of 16	Torino	0–2	Fiorentina	Turin
15:00 CET (UTC+01:00)	Aina (yellow card) 75'	Report	Benassi (yellow card) 24'; Milenković (yellow card) 32'; Veretout (yellow card) 45'; Pezzella (yellow card) 53'; Chiesa 87', 90+2'	Stadium: Stadio Olimpico Grande Torino; Attendance: 16,957; Referee: Rosario Abisso

== Statistics ==
=== Appearances and goals ===
No.	Pos	Nat	Player	Total		Serie A		Coppa Italia	
No.	Pos	Nat	Player	Apps	Goals	Apps	Goals	Apps	Goals
Goalkeepers
1	GK	(Uruguay) URU	Salvador Ichazo	4	0	2+1	0	1	0
25	GK	(Italy) ITA	Antonio Rosati	0	0	0	0	0	0
39	GK	(Italy) ITA	Salvatore Sirigu	38	0	36	0	2	0
Defenders
5	DF	(Italy) ITA	Armando Izzo	39	4	37	4	2	0
15	DF	(Argentina) ARG	Cristian Ansaldi	24	0	23+1	0	0	0
24	DF	(Italy) ITA	Emiliano Moretti	26	0	22+2	0	2	0
29	DF	(Italy) ITA	Lorenzo De Silvestri	34	2	30+2	2	2	0
30	DF	(Ivory Coast) CIV	Koffi Djidji	18	0	16+1	0	1	0
33	DF	(Cameroon) CMR	Nicolas Nkoulou	38	2	36	2	2	0
34	DF	(Nigeria) NGA	Ola Aina	32	1	22+8	1	1+1	0
36	DF	(Brazil) BRA	Bremer	7	0	2+3	0	1+1	0
99	DF	(Ecuador) ECU	Erick Ferigra	1	0	0	0	0+1	0
Midfielders
7	MF	(Serbia) SRB	Saša Lukić	27	2	11+13	2	1+2	0
8	MF	(Italy) ITA	Daniele Baselli	37	5	27+7	4	3	1
23	MF	(France) FRA	Soualiho Meïté	38	2	30+5	2	2+1	0
88	MF	(Venezuela) VEN	Tomás Rincón	37	1	32+2	0	2+1	1
Forwards
9	FW	(Italy) ITA	Andrea Belotti	39	17	37	15	2	2
11	FW	(Italy) ITA	Simone Zaza	30	4	11+18	4	1	0
14	FW	(Spain) ESP	Iago Falque	28	6	19+7	6	2	0
19	FW	(Moldova) MDA	Vitalie Damașcan	1	0	0+1	0	0	0
21	FW	(Spain) ESP	Álex Berenguer	34	2	15+16	2	2+1	0
27	FW	(Italy) ITA	Vittorio Parigini	18	0	2+15	0	1	0
72	FW	(Italy) ITA	Vincenzo Millico	1	0	0+1	0	0	0
Players transferred out during the season
3	DF	(Brazil) BRA	Lyanco	4	0	1+1	0	1+1	0
6	MF	(Italy) ITA	Roberto Soriano	12	1	6+5	0	1	1
10	FW	(Serbia) SRB	Adem Ljajić	1	0	0+1	0	0	0
20	FW	(Italy) ITA	Simone Edera	4	1	1+2	0	1	1

Last updated: 26 May 2019
Source: Competitions

=== Goalscorers ===
Rank	No.	Pos	Nat	Name	Serie A	Coppa Italia	Total
1	9	FW	(Italy)	Andrea Belotti	15	2	17
2	14	FW	(Spain)	Iago Falque	6	0	6
3	8	MF	(Italy)	Daniele Baselli	4	1	5
4	5	DF	(Italy)	Armando Izzo	4	0	4
4	11	FW	(Italy)	Simone Zaza	4	0	4
4	88	MF	(Venezuela)	Tomás Rincón	3	1	4
7	15	DF	(Argentina)	Cristian Ansaldi	3	0	3
8	7	MF	(Serbia)	Saša Lukić	2	0	2
8	21	FW	(Spain)	Álex Berenguer	2	0	2
8	23	MF	(France)	Soualiho Meïté	2	0	2
8	29	DF	(Italy)	Lorenzo De Silvestri	2	0	2
8	33	DF	(Cameroon)	Nicolas Nkoulou	2	0	2
13	6	MF	(Italy)	Roberto Soriano	0	1	1
13	20	FW	(Italy)	Simone Edera	0	1	1
13	34	DF	(Nigeria)	Ola Aina	1	0	1
Own goal					2	0	2
Totals					52	6	58

Last updated: 26 May 2019

=== Clean sheets ===
Rank	No.	Pos	Nat	Name	Serie A	Coppa Italia	Total
1	39	GK	(Italy)	Salvatore Sirigu	14	1	15
2	1	GK	(Uruguay)	Salvador Ichazo	1	1	2
Totals					15	2	17

Last updated: 26 May 2019

=== Disciplinary record ===
No.	Pos	Nat	Name	Serie A			Coppa Italia			Total		
No.	Pos	Nat	Name	Booked	(yellow card) (yellow-red card)	Sent off (straight red)	Booked	(yellow card) (yellow-red card)	Sent off (straight red)	Booked	(yellow card) (yellow-red card)	Sent off (straight red)
39	GK	(Italy)	Salvatore Sirigu	1	0	0	0	0	0	1	0	0
3	DF	(Brazil)	Lyanco	1	0	0	0	0	0	1	0	0
5	DF	(Italy)	Armando Izzo	6	0	0	0	0	0	6	0	0
15	DF	(Argentina)	Cristian Ansaldi	3	0	0	0	0	0	3	0	0
24	DF	(Italy)	Emiliano Moretti	5	0	0	0	0	0	5	0	0
29	DF	(Italy)	Lorenzo De Silvestri	2	0	0	0	0	0	2	0	0
30	DF	(Nigeria)	Koffi Djidji	2	0	0	0	0	0	2	0	0
33	DF	(Cameroon)	Nicolas Nkoulou	6	1	0	0	0	0	6	1	0
34	DF	(Nigeria)	Ola Aina	5	0	1	1	0	0	6	0	1
36	DF	(Brazil)	Bremer	1	0	0	0	0	0	1	0	0
6	MF	(Italy)	Roberto Soriano	1	0	0	1	0	0	2	0	0
7	MF	(Serbia)	Saša Lukić	7	0	0	0	0	0	7	0	0
8	MF	(Italy)	Daniele Baselli	5	0	0	0	0	0	5	0	0
23	MF	(France)	Soualiho Meïté	7	0	1	0	0	0	7	0	1
88	MF	(Venezuela)	Tomás Rincón	15	0	0	0	0	0	15	0	0
9	FW	(Italy)	Andrea Belotti	5	0	0	0	0	0	5	0	0
11	FW	(Italy)	Simone Zaza	8	0	1	0	0	0	8	0	1
14	FW	(Spain)	Iago Falque	1	0	0	0	0	0	1	0	0
21	FW	(Spain)	Álex Berenguer	4	0	0	1	0	0	5	0	0
27	FW	(Italy)	Vittorio Parigini	2	0	0	0	0	0	2	0	0
Totals				87	1	3	3	0	0	90	1	3

Last updated: 26 May 2019
