= 2019–20 Torino FC season =

Torino
2019–20 season
- President: Urbano Cairo
- Manager: Walter Mazzarri (until 4 February); Moreno Longo (from 4 February)
- Stadium: Stadio Olimpico Grande Torino
- Serie A: 16th
- Coppa Italia: Quarter-finals
- UEFA Europa League: Play-off round
- Top goalscorer: League: Andrea Belotti (16); All: Andrea Belotti (22)
Home colours	Away colours	Third colours

The 2019–20 season was Torino FC's 109th season of competitive football, 92nd season in the top division of Italian football and 75th season in Serie A. The club competed in Serie A, the Coppa Italia, and, following Milan's exclusion from the competition following their breach of Financial Fair Play regulations, in the UEFA Europa League, starting in the second qualifying round.

The season was coach Walter Mazzarri's second full campaign in charge of Torino, after replacing Siniša Mihajlović following his sacking during the 2017–18 season.

== Players ==
=== Squad information ===
Last updated on 8 February 2020
Appearances include league matches only

No.	Name	Nat	Position(s)	Date of birth (age)	Signed from	Signed in	Contract ends	Apps.	Goals
Goalkeepers
18	Samir Ujkani	(Kosovo)	GK	5 July 1988 (age 37)	(Turkey) Çaykur Rizespor	2019	2020	0	0
25	Antonio Rosati	(Italy)	GK	26 June 1983 (age 42)	(Italy) Perugia	2018	2019	0	0
39	Salvatore Sirigu	(Italy)	GK	12 January 1987 (age 39)	(France) Paris Saint-Germain	2017	2022	97	0
Defenders
4	Lyanco	(Brazil)	CB	1 February 1997 (age 29)	(Brazil) São Paulo	2017	2022	15	0
5	Armando Izzo	(Italy)	CB / RB	2 March 1992 (age 34)	(Italy) Genoa	2018	2022	59	5
15	Cristian Ansaldi	(Argentina)	LB / RB	20 September 1986 (age 39)	(Italy) Internazionale	2017	2021	63	8
17	Wilfried Singo	(Ivory Coast)	CB / RB	25 December 2000 (age 25)	(Italy) Youth Sector	2019	2022	0	0
29	Lorenzo De Silvestri	(Italy)	RB	23 May 1988 (age 37)	(Italy) Sampdoria	2016	2020	100	8
30	Koffi Djidji	(Ivory Coast)	CB	30 November 1992 (age 33)	(France) Nantes	2018	2019	29	0
33	Nicolas Nkoulou	(Cameroon)	CB	27 March 1990 (age 36)	(France) Lyon	2017	2018	90	4
34	Ola Aina	(Nigeria)	RB / LB / RM	8 October 1996 (age 29)	(England) Chelsea	2018	2019	49	1
36	Bremer	(Brazil)	CB	18 March 1997 (age 29)	(Brazil) Atlético Mineiro	2018	2023	17	1
Midfielders
7	Saša Lukić	(Serbia)	CM / DM	13 August 1996 (age 29)	(Serbia) Partizan	2016	2023	54	2
8	Daniele Baselli	(Italy)	CM / AM	12 March 1992 (age 34)	(Italy) Atalanta	2015	2022	153	18
23	Soualiho Meïté	(France)	DM / CM	17 March 1994 (age 32)	(France) Monaco	2018	2023	55	2
80	Ndary Adopo	(France)	CM	19 July 2000 (age 25)	(Italy) Youth Sector	2018	2023	1	0
88	Tomás Rincón	(Venezuela)	DM / CM	13 January 1988 (age 38)	(Italy) Juventus	2017	2018	89	5
Forwards
9	Andrea Belotti	(Italy)	CF	20 December 1993 (age 32)	(Italy) Palermo	2015	2021	160	72
11	Simone Zaza	(Italy)	CF	25 June 1991 (age 34)	(Spain) Valencia	2018	2023	42	7
20	Simone Edera	(Italy)	RW	9 January 1997 (age 29)	(Italy) Youth Sector	2016	2023	23	1
21	Álex Berenguer	(Spain)	LW	4 July 1995 (age 30)	(Spain) Osasuna	2017	2022	69	8
22	Vincenzo Millico	(Italy)	SS / LW / RW	12 August 2000 (age 25)	(Italy) Youth Sector	2019	2023	6	0
24	Simone Verdi	(Italy)	AM / LW / RW	12 July 1992 (age 33)	(Italy) Napoli	2019	2020	21	1
Players transferred during the season
10	Iago Falque	(Spain)	LW / RW / SS	4 January 1990 (age 36)	(Italy) Roma	2016	2020	102	30
14	Kevin Bonifazi	(Italy)	CB	19 May 1996 (age 29)	(Italy) Youth Sector	2015	2022	9	1
27	Vittorio Parigini	(Italy)	RW / LW / AM	25 March 1996 (age 30)	(Italy) Youth Sector	2013	2020	17	0
93	Diego Laxalt	(Uruguay)	LM / LB /CM	7 February 1993 (age 33)	(Italy) Milan	2019	2020	16	0

== Transfers ==
=== In ===
Date	Pos.	Player	Age	Moving from	Fee	Notes	Source

==== Loans in ====
Date	Pos.	Player	Age	Moving from	Fee	Notes	Source
2 September 2019	FW	(Italy) Simone Verdi	27	(Italy) Napoli	€4M	€4M loan with a €21M obligation to buy	

=== Out ===
Date	Pos.	Player	Age	Moving to	Fee	Notes	Source

==== Loans out ====
Date	Pos.	Player	Age	Moving to	Fee	Notes	Source

== Pre-season and friendlies ==
14 July 2019 Friendly	Torino (Italy)	15–0	(Italy) Merano	Turin
15:00 CEST (UTC+2)	Belotti 7', 26', 35', 50'; Bremer 21'; De Silvestri 33'; Falque 37'; Berenguer 41', 54'; Zaza 47', 58', 60', 80', 81', 90'	Report		Stadium: Stadio Olimpico Grande Torino

18 July 2019 Friendly	Torino (Italy)	3–2	(Italy) Pro Patria	Turin
16:00 CEST (UTC+2)	Belotti 18', 59'; Ansaldi 56'	Report	Parker 44'; Mastroianni 52'	Stadium: Stadio Olimpico Grande Torino

== Competitions ==
=== Serie A ===
==== League table ====
Pos	Team	Pld	W	D	L	GF	GA	GD	Pts	Qualification or relegation
14	Cagliari	38	11	12	15	52	56	−4	45 (Note: Udinese finished ahead of Cagliari on head-to-head points: Udinese 2–1 Cagliari, Cagliari 0–1 Udinese.)	
15	Sampdoria	38	12	6	20	48	65	−17	42	
16	Torino	38	11	7	20	46	68	−22	40	
17	Genoa	38	10	9	19	47	73	−26	39	
18	Lecce (R)	38	9	8	21	52	85	−33	35	Relegation to Serie B

Source: Serie A, Soccerway
Rules for classification: 1) Points; 2) Head-to-head points; 3) Head-to-head goal difference; 4) Goal difference; 5) Goals scored; 6) Draw. (Note: Head-to-head record is used only after all the matches between the teams in question have been played)
(R) Relegated

==== Results summary ====
Overall								Home						Away					
Pld	W	D	L	GF	GA	GD	Pts	W	D	L	GF	GA	GD	W	D	L	GF	GA	GD
38	11	7	20	46	68	−22	40	7	4	8	23	30	−7	4	3	12	23	38	−15

Last updated: 2 August 2020.
Source: Competitive matches

==== Results by round ====
Round	1	2	3	4	5	6	7	8	9	10	11	12	13	14	15	16	17	18	19	20	21	22	23	24	25	26	27	28	29	30	31	32	33	34	35	36	37	38
Ground	H	A	H	A	H	A	H	A	H	A	H	A	H	A	H	A	H	A	H	A	H	A	H	A	H	A	H	A	H	A	H	A	H	A	H	A	H	A
Result	W	W	L	L	W	L	D	L	D	L	L	W	L	W	W	D	L	W	W	L	L	L	L	L	D	L	W	L	L	L	W	L	W	L	D	D	L	D
Position	6	3	6	10	6	8	9	11	11	13	14	11	11	10	9	9	10	9	8	9	12	12	13	14	14	15	14	14	15	16	16	16	15	15	16	16	16	16

Updated to match(es) played on 2 August 2020. Source: Competitive matches
A = Away; H = Home; W = Win; D = Draw; L = Loss

==== Matches ====
25 August 2019 1	Torino	2–1	Sassuolo	Turin
20:45 CEST (UTC+02:00)	Zaza 14', (yellow card) 90+2'; Ansaldi (yellow card) 24'; Bremer (yellow card) 35'; Belotti 55'; Sirigu (yellow card) 77'	Report	Marlon (yellow card) 11'; Bourabia (yellow card) 45+3'; Caputo 69'; Obiang (yellow card) 78'	Stadium: Stadio Olimpico Grande Torino; Attendance: 16,536; Referee: Maurizio Mariani

1 September 2019 2	Atalanta	2–3	Torino	Parma
20:45 CEST (UTC+02:00)	Zapata 38', 54'; Hateboer (yellow card) 65'; De Roon (yellow card) 76'	Report	Berenguer (yellow card) 21', (goal) 57'; Bonifazi 24'; Izzo 66'	Stadium: Stadio Ennio Tardini; Attendance: 8,182; Referee: Daniele Doveri
Note: Match played at the Stadio Ennio Tardini in Parma due to renovation work on Atalanta's home ground, the Stadio Atleti Azzurri d'Italia.

16 September 2019 3	Torino	1–2	Lecce	Turin
20:45 CEST (UTC+02:00)	Berenguer (yellow card) 40'; Belotti 58' (pen.)	Report	Rossettini (yellow card) 15'; Lucioni (yellow card) 18'; Farias 35'; Lapadula (yellow card) 50'; Tabanelli (yellow card) 56'; Mancosu 73'; Rispoli (yellow card) 88'	Stadium: Stadio Olimpico Grande Torino; Attendance: 21,620; Referee: Antonio Giua

22 September 2019 4	Sampdoria	1–0	Torino	Genoa
15:00 CEST (UTC+02:00)	Gabbiadini 56'; Rigoni (yellow card) 78'; Quagliarella (yellow card) 80'	Report	Zaza (yellow card) 59'	Stadium: Stadio Luigi Ferraris; Attendance: 19,041; Referee: Piero Giacomelli

26 September 2019 5	Torino	2–1	Milan	Turin
21:00 CEST (UTC+02:00)	Lyanco (yellow card) 8'; Zaza (yellow card) 31'; Belotti (yellow card) 33', (goal) 72', 76'; Aina (yellow card) 81'	Report	Piątek 19' (pen.); Bennacer (yellow card) 21'; Hernandez (yellow card) 62'; Reina (red card) 73'; Romagnoli (yellow card) 73'; Donnarumma (yellow card) 77'; Musacchio (yellow card) 88'	Stadium: Stadio Olimpico Grande Torino; Attendance: 23,997; Referee: Marco Guida

30 September 2019 6	Parma	3–2	Torino	Parma
20:45 CEST (UTC+02:00)	Kulusevski 2'; Laurini (yellow card) 41'; Cornelius 45+3'; Hernani (yellow card) 68'; Inglese 88'	Report	Ansaldi 12'; Bremer (yellow card) 21' (yellow-red card) 29'; Rincón (yellow card) 35'; Belotti 43' (pen.)	Stadium: Stadio Ennio Tardini; Attendance: 15,001; Referee: Federico La Penna

6 October 2019 7	Torino	0–0	Napoli	Turin
18:00 CEST (UTC+02:00)	Lukić (yellow card) 35'	Report	Lozano (yellow card) 37'; Luperto (yellow card) 45+2'	Stadium: Stadio Olimpico Grande Torino; Attendance: 24,343; Referee: Daniele Doveri

20 October 2019 8	Udinese	1–0	Torino	Udine
15:00 CEST (UTC+02:00)	Jajalo (yellow card) 40'; Okaka 42', (yellow card) 80'; Becão (yellow card) 74'	Report	Lukić (yellow card) 26'; Laxalt (yellow card) 55'; Izzo (yellow card) 57'	Stadium: Dacia Arena; Attendance: 24,049; Referee: Rosario Abisso

27 October 2019 9	Torino	1–1	Cagliari	Turin
15:00 CET (UTC+01:00)	Ansaldi (yellow card) 67'; Zaza 69'; Rincón (yellow card) 90+1'	Report	Nández 40'; Nainggolan (yellow card) 56'; Ceppitelli (yellow card) 73'; Cigarini (yellow card) 78'	Stadium: Stadio Olimpico Grande Torino; Attendance: 21,213; Referee: Michael Fabbri

30 October 2019 10	Lazio	4–0	Torino	Rome
21:00 CET (UTC+01:00)	Acerbi 25', (yellow card) 55'; Immobile 33', 70' (pen.); Marušić (yellow card) 67'; Belotti 90' (o.g.)	Report	Nkoulou (yellow card) 21' (yellow-red card) 68'	Stadium: Stadio Olimpico; Attendance: 20,500; Referee: Daniele Orsato

2 November 2019 11	Torino	0–1	Juventus	Turin
20:45 CET (UTC+01:00)	Aina (yellow card) 44'; Ansaldi (yellow card) 63'; Baselli (yellow card) 68'; Belotti (yellow card) 90+3'	Report	Bentancur (yellow card) 54'; Cuadrado (yellow card) 57'; De Ligt 70'	Stadium: Stadio Olimpico Grande Torino; Attendance: 26,664; Referee: Daniele Doveri

9 November 2019 12	Brescia	0–4	Torino	Brescia
15:00 CET (UTC+01:00)	Cistana (yellow card) 15'; Matějů (yellow card) 27' (yellow-red card) 41'; Magnani (yellow card) 61'; Tonali (yellow card) 86'	Report	Belotti 17' (pen.), 26' (pen.); Ansaldi (yellow card) 35'; Lukić (yellow card) 59'; Meïté (yellow card) 73'; Berenguer 75', 81'	Stadium: Stadio Mario Rigamonti; Attendance: 13,500; Referee: Marco Guida

23 November 2019 13	Torino	0–3	Internazionale	Turin
20:45 CET (UTC+01:00)	Izzo (yellow card) 59'; Aina (yellow card) 73'	Report	Martínez 12', (yellow card) 35'; De Vrij 32'; Lukaku 55'; D'Ambrosio (yellow card) 58'; Škriniar (yellow card) 64'	Stadium: Stadio Olimpico Grande Torino; Attendance: 26,059; Referee: Fabio Maresca

30 November 2019 14	Genoa	0–1	Torino	Genoa
18:00 CET (UTC+01:00)	Sturaro (yellow card) 75'; Agudelo (yellow card) 90'	Report	Baselli (yellow card) 60'; Bremer 77'; Edera (yellow card) 90' (yellow-red card) 90+5'	Stadium: Stadio Luigi Ferraris; Attendance: 20,000; Referee: Davide Massa

8 December 2019 15	Torino	2–1	Fiorentina	Turin
15:00 CET (UTC+01:00)	Zaza 22'; Aina (yellow card) 32'; Baselli (yellow card) 41'; Rincón (yellow card) 61'; Ansaldi 72'; Izzo (yellow card) 90+2'	Report	Chiesa (yellow card) 31'; Cáceres (yellow card) 49', (goal) 90+1'; Vlahović (yellow card) 68'	Stadium: Stadio Olimpico Grande Torino; Attendance: 19,955; Referee: Piero Giacomelli

15 December 2019 16	Hellas Verona	3–3	Torino	Verona
12:30 CET (UTC+01:00)	Amrabat (yellow card) 35'; Günter (yellow card) 40'; Veloso (yellow card) 65'; Pazzini 69' (pen.); Verre 76'; Stępiński 84'	Report	Ansaldi 36', 61'; Bremer (yellow card) 52'; Berenguer 55'	Stadium: Stadio Marc'Antonio Bentegodi; Attendance: 16,453; Referee: Federico La Penna

21 December 2019 17	Torino	1–2	SPAL	Turin
20:45 CET (UTC+01:00)	Rincón 4'; Ansaldi (yellow card) 24'; Bremer (yellow card) 41' (yellow-red card) 55'; Sirigu (yellow card) 44'	Report	Espeto 42'; Valoti (yellow card) 63'; Igor (yellow card) 68'; Missiroli (yellow card) 71'; Petagna 81', (yellow card) 82'	Stadium: Stadio Olimpico Grande Torino; Attendance: 18,553; Referee: Michael Fabbri

5 January 2020 18	Roma	0–2	Torino	Rome
20:45 CET (UTC+01:00)	Diawara (yellow card) 28'; Veretout (yellow card) 45'; Kolarov (yellow card) 55'; Mancini (yellow card) 64'; Florenzi (yellow card) 77'	Report	Izzo (yellow card) 15'; Verdi (yellow card) 20'; Belotti 45+2', 86' (pen.)	Stadium: Stadio Olimpico; Attendance: 38,954; Referee: Marco Di Bello

12 January 2020 19	Torino	1–0	Bologna	Turin
15:00 CET (UTC+01:00)	De Silvestri (yellow card) 4'; Berenguer 11'; Lukić (yellow card) 20'; Sirigu (yellow card) 59'; Nkoulou (yellow card) 83'; Laxalt (yellow card) 88'	Report	Bani (yellow card) 15'; Santander (yellow card) 83'; Sansone (yellow card) 90+5'	Stadium: Stadio Olimpico Grande Torino; Attendance: 15,000; Referee: Marco Piccinini

18 January 2020 20	Sassuolo	2–1	Torino	Reggio Emilia
18:00 CET (UTC+01:00)	Kyriakopoulos (yellow card) 38'; Toljan (yellow card) 54'; Boga 61'; Berardi 73'	Report	Locatelli 20' (o.g.); Nkoulou (yellow card) 38'; Verdi (yellow card) 39'; Rincón (yellow card) 42'; Aina (yellow card) 60'	Stadium: Mapei Stadium – Città del Tricolore; Attendance: 10,765; Referee: Davide Massa

25 January 2020 21	Torino	0–7	Atalanta	Turin
20:45 CET (UTC+01:00)	Izzo (yellow card) 44' (yellow-red card) 76'; Lukić (red card) 89'; Sirigu (yellow card) 90'	Report	Iličić 17', 53', 54'; Gosens 29'; De Roon (yellow card) 38'; Zapata 45+1' (pen.); Muriel 86' (pen.), 88'; Hateboer (yellow card) 90'	Stadium: Stadio Olimpico Grande Torino; Attendance: 18,824; Referee: Marco Guida

2 February 2020 22	Lecce	4–0	Torino	Lecce
18:00 CET (UTC+01:00)	Deiola 11', (yellow card) 43'; Barák 19'; Majer (yellow card) 33'; Falco 64'; Lapadula (yellow card) 76', (goal) 78' (pen.)	Report	Nkoulou (yellow card) 12'; Meïté (yellow card) 18'; Aina (yellow card) 60'	Stadium: Stadio Via del Mare; Attendance: 21,947; Referee: Gianluca Rocchi

8 February 2020 23	Torino	1–3	Sampdoria	Turin
18:00 CET (UTC+01:00)	Berenguer (yellow card) 22'; Verdi 55'; Belotti (yellow card) 60'; Rincón (yellow card) 69'; Izzo (red card) 78'	Report	Tonelli (yellow card) 21'; Ekdal (yellow card) 39'; Thorsby (yellow card) 45+2'; Murru (yellow card) 68'; Ramírez 70', 75'; Quagliarella 79' (pen.); Colley (yellow card) 84'	Stadium: Stadio Olimpico Grande Torino; Attendance: 20,664; Referee: Paolo Valeri

17 February 2020 24	Milan	1–0	Torino	Milan
20:45 CET (UTC+01:00)	Bennacer (yellow card) 22'; Rebić 25'; Castillejo (yellow card) 50'; Gabbia (yellow card) 85'	Report	Edera (yellow card) 34'; Rincón (yellow card) 60'; Ansaldi (yellow card) 73'	Stadium: San Siro; Attendance: 46,114; Referee: Michael Fabbri

29 February 2020 26	Napoli	2–1	Torino	Naples
20:45 CET (UTC+01:00)	Manolas 19'; Di Lorenzo 82'; Allan (yellow card) 90+3'	Report	Rincón (yellow card) 36'; Zaza (yellow card) 40'; Edera 90+1'; Ansaldi (yellow card) 90+2'	Stadium: Stadio San Paolo; Attendance: 23,586; Referee: Maurizio Mariani

20 June 2020 25	Torino	1–1	Parma	Turin
19:30 CEST (UTC+02:00)	Nkoulou 15'; Rincón (yellow card) 62'	Report	Kucka 31'; Iacoponi (yellow card) 47'; Brugman (yellow card) 87'	Stadium: Stadio Olimpico Grande Torino; Attendance: 0 Referee: Massimiliano Irrati
Note: Match was initially postponed to 11 March, from its original date of 23 February due to concerns over the COVID-19 pandemic, but was later moved to 18 March, then to 20 June, to be played behind closed doors. All subsequent matches were also shuffled to allow for this accommodation. On 9 March, all sports events in Italy were suspended until 3 April. This was the first match played since the COVID-19 pandemic lockdown in Italy.

23 June 2020 27	Torino	1–0	Udinese	Turin
21:45 CEST (UTC+02:00)	Belotti 16'; Meïté (yellow card) 18'; Edera (yellow card) 39'	Report	Fofana (yellow card) 64'; De Paul (yellow card) 85'	Stadium: Stadio Olimpico Grande Torino; Attendance: 0 Referee: Fabio Maresca
Note: Match was postponed to 14 March, then to 23 June, from its original date of 9 March due to schedule shuffling to allow for previous postponements to be played due to concerns over the COVID-19 pandemic.

27 June 2020 28	Cagliari	4–2	Torino	Cagliari
19:30 CEST (UTC+02:00)	Nández 12'; Simeone 17'; Mattiello (yellow card) 32'; Nainggolan 46'; João Pedro 68' (pen.); Cigarini (yellow card) 76'; Carboni (yellow card) 81'	Report	Bremer 60'; Belotti 66'	Stadium: Sardegna Arena; Attendance: 0 Referee: Maurizio Mariani

30 June 2020 29	Torino	1–2	Lazio	Turin
19:30 CEST (UTC+02:00)	Belotti 5' (pen.); Verdi (yellow card) 45'	Report	Immobile (yellow card) 4', (goal) 48'; Caicedo (yellow card) 29'; Parolo 73'; Lukaku (yellow card) 74'	Stadium: Stadio Olimpico Grande Torino; Attendance: 0 Referee: Davide Massa

4 July 2020 30	Juventus	4–1	Torino	Turin
17:15 CEST (UTC+02:00)	Dybala 3', (yellow card) 70'; Bonucci (yellow card) 26'; Cuadrado 29'; Pjanić (yellow card) 40'; De Ligt (yellow card) 45+5'; Ronaldo 61'; Djidji 87' (o.g.)	Report	Belotti 45+6' (pen.); Izzo (yellow card) 58'; Aina (yellow card) 60'	Stadium: Allianz Stadium; Attendance: 0 Referee: Fabio Maresca

8 July 2020 31	Torino	3–1	Brescia	Turin
21:45 CEST (UTC+02:00)	Matějů 48' (o.g.); Belotti 58'; Zaza (yellow card) 76', (goal) 86'	Report	Torregrossa 21'; Papetti (yellow card) 52'; Tonali (yellow card) 57'; Donnarumma (yellow card) 82'	Stadium: Stadio Olimpico Grande Torino; Attendance: 0 Referee: Daniele Doveri

13 July 2020 32	Internazionale	3–1	Torino	Milan
21:45 CEST (UTC+02:00)	Godín (yellow card) 21', (goal) 51'; Young 48'; Brozović (yellow card) 60'; Martínez 61'; Sánchez (yellow card) 62'; D'Ambrosio (yellow card) 69'; Biraghi (yellow card) 86'	Report	Belotti 17'; Aina (yellow card) 24'; Meïté (yellow card) 30'; De Silvestri (yellow card) 49'	Stadium: San Siro; Attendance: 0 Referee: Davide Massa

16 July 2020 33	Torino	3–0	Genoa	Turin
19:30 CEST (UTC+02:00)	Bremer 32'; Lyanco (yellow card) 53'; Lukić 76'; Zaza (yellow card) 86'; Belotti 90'	Report	Masiello (yellow card) 23'; Goldaniga (yellow card) 26'	Stadium: Stadio Olimpico Grande Torino; Attendance: 0 Referee: Gianluca Rocchi

19 July 2020 34	Fiorentina	2–0	Torino	Florence
19:30 CEST (UTC+02:00)	Lyanco 2' (o.g.); Pezzella (yellow card) 44'; Cutrone 75'	Report	Lyanco (yellow card) 5'; Lukić (yellow card) 36'	Stadium: Stadio Artemio Franchi; Attendance: 0 Referee: Maurizio Mariani

22 July 2020 35	Torino	1–1	Hellas Verona	Turin
21:45 CEST (UTC+02:00)	Lyanco (yellow card) 39'; Nkoulou (yellow card) 56'; Zaza (yellow card) 59', (goal) 67'; Verdi (yellow card) 60'	Report	Empereur (yellow card) 39'; Borini 56' (pen.); Eysseric (yellow card) 89'	Stadium: Stadio Olimpico Grande Torino; Attendance: 0 Referee: Paolo Valeri

26 July 2020 36	SPAL	1–1	Torino	Ferrara
19:30 CEST (UTC+02:00)	Cionek (yellow card) 18'; Salamon (yellow card) 39'; D'Alessandro 80'	Report	Ansaldi (yellow card) 38'; Belotti (yellow card) 42'; Rincón (yellow card) 45'; Verdi 57'	Stadium: Stadio Paolo Mazza; Attendance: 0 Referee: Rosario Abisso

29 July 2020 37	Torino	2–3	Roma	Turin
21:45 CEST (UTC+02:00)	Berenguer 14'; Lyanco (yellow card) 23'; Meïté (yellow card) 55'; Singo 66'	Report	Džeko 16'; Smalling 23'; Pérez (yellow card) 35'; Mancini (yellow card) 38'; Diawara 61' (pen.); Zaniolo (yellow card) 81'	Stadium: Stadio Olimpico Grande Torino; Attendance: 0 Referee: Marco Piccinini

2 August 2020 38	Bologna	1–1	Torino	Bologna
20:45 CEST (UTC+02:00)	Svanberg 18'; Santander (yellow card) 76'; Soriano (yellow card) 80'; Medel (yellow card) 85'	Report	Ansaldi (yellow card) 45+2'; Rincón (yellow card) 56'; Berenguer (yellow card) 60'; Zaza 66'	Stadium: Stadio Renato Dall'Ara; Attendance: 0 Referee: Antonio Di Martino

=== Coppa Italia ===
9 January 2020 Round of 16	Torino	1–1 (a.e.t.) (5–3 p)	Genoa	Turin
21:15 CET (UTC+01:00)	De Silvestri 23'; Meïté (yellow card) 29' (yellow-red card) 105+1'; Aina (yellow card) 97'	Report	Favilli 14'; Romero (yellow card) 29'; El Yamiq (yellow card) 62'; Radovanović (yellow card) 107'	Stadium: Stadio Olimpico Grande Torino; Attendance: 3,975; Referee: Juan Luca Sacchi
	Penalties
	Belotti (penalty scored); Millico (penalty scored); Rincón (penalty scored); Aina (penalty scored); Berenguer (penalty scored)		(penalty scored) Destro; (penalty scored) Favilli; (penalty scored) Cassata; (penalty missed) Radovanović

28 January 2020 Quarter-finals	Milan	4–2 (a.e.t.)	Torino	Milan
20:45 CET (UTC+01:00)	Bonaventura 12'; Hernandez (yellow card) 30'; Rebić (yellow card) 37'; Kjær (yellow card) 53'; Krunić (yellow card) 74'; Çalhanoğlu 90+1', 106'; Conti (yellow card) 93'; Ibrahimović 109', (yellow card) 111'	Report	Rincón (yellow card) 22'; Bremer 34', 71'; Izzo (yellow card) 37'	Stadium: San Siro; Attendance: 36,462; Referee: Fabrizio Pasqua

=== UEFA Europa League ===
==== Second qualifying round ====
25 July 2019 First leg	Torino (Italy)	3–0	(Hungary) Debrecen	Alessandria, Italy
21:00 CEST (UTC+02:00)	Belotti 20' (pen.); Ansaldi 42'; Zaza (yellow card) 83', (goal) 90+3'	Report	Varga (yellow card) 28'; Pávkovics (yellow card) 54'	Stadium: Stadio Giuseppe Moccagatta; Attendance: 4,376; Referee: Jens Maae (Denmark)

1 August 2019 Second leg	Debrecen (Hungary)	1–4 (1–7 agg.)	(Italy) Torino	Debrecen, Hungary
18:30 CEST (UTC+02:00)	Garba (yellow card) 27', (goal) 52'; Pávkovics (yellow card) 54'	Report	Zaza 25', (yellow card) 61'; Izzo 32'; Meïté (yellow card) 38'; Belotti 69'; Millico 90+2'	Stadium: Nagyerdei Stadion; Attendance: 15,350; Referee: Fran Jović (Croatia)

==== Third qualifying round ====
8 August 2019 First leg	Torino (Italy)	5–0	(Belarus) Shakhtyor Soligorsk	Turin, Italy
21:00 CEST (UTC+02:00)	Belotti 2', 63' (pen.); Izzo 15'; Bremer (yellow card) 48'; De Silvestri 71'; Bonifazi 76'	Report	Ebong (yellow card) 25'; Balanovich (yellow card) 57'	Stadium: Stadio Olimpico Grande Torino; Attendance: 15,977; Referee: Daniel Stefański (Poland)

15 August 2019 Second leg	Shakhtyor Soligorsk (Belarus)	1–1 (1–6 agg.)	(Italy) Torino	Minsk, Belarus
20:00 FET (UTC+03:00)	Yanush 90+1' (pen.)	Report	Ansaldi (yellow card) 62'; Lukić (yellow card) 77'; Zaza 80'	Stadium: Dinamo Stadium; Attendance: 6,154; Referee: Radu Petrescu (Romania)

==== Play-off round ====
22 August 2019 First leg	Torino (Italy)	2–3	(England) Wolverhampton Wanderers	Turin, Italy
21:00 CEST (UTC+02:00)	Belotti (yellow card) 45+1', (goal) 89' (pen.); Ansaldi (yellow card) 48'; Berenguer (yellow card) 56'; De Silvestri 61'; Baselli (yellow card) 71'; Bremer (yellow card) 73'; Rincón (yellow card) 85'	Report	Bremer 43' (o.g.); Jota 59'; Jiménez 72'; Saïss (yellow card) 79'; Vallejo (yellow card) 82'	Stadium: Stadio Olimpico Grande Torino; Attendance: 24,091; Referee: Artur Soares Dias (Portugal)

29 August 2019 Second leg	Wolverhampton Wanderers (England)	2–1 (5–3 agg.)	(Italy) Torino	Wolverhampton, England
19:45 BST (UTC+01:00)	Jiménez 30'; Jonny (yellow card) 45'; Dendoncker 58'	Report	Baselli (yellow card) 33'; Lukić (yellow card) 48'; Belotti 57'; Bremer (yellow card) 63'	Stadium: Molineux Stadium; Attendance: 29,222; Referee: Jesús Gil Manzano (Spain)

== Statistics ==
=== Appearances and goals ===
No.	Pos	Nat	Player	Total		Serie A		Coppa Italia		Europa League	
No.	Pos	Nat	Player	Apps	Goals	Apps	Goals	Apps	Goals	Apps	Goals
Goalkeepers
18	GK	(Kosovo) KOS	Samir Ujkani	1	0	1	0	0	0	0	0
25	GK	(Italy) ITA	Antonio Rosati	1	0	1	0	0	0	0	0
39	GK	(Italy) ITA	Salvatore Sirigu	44	0	36	0	2	0	6	0
Defenders
4	DF	(Brazil) BRA	Lyanco	18	0	15+2	0	0+1	0	0	0
5	DF	(Italy) ITA	Armando Izzo	37	3	30+1	1	1	0	5	2
15	DF	(Argentina) ARG	Cristian Ansaldi	32	5	21+6	4	0	0	5	1
17	DF	(Ivory Coast) CIV	Wilfried Singo	7	1	1+3	1	0	0	0+3	0
29	DF	(Italy) ITA	Lorenzo De Silvestri	37	3	28+1	0	2	1	6	2
30	DF	(Ivory Coast) CIV	Koffi Djidji	19	0	9+8	0	1+1	0	0	0
33	DF	(Cameroon) CMR	Nicolas Nkoulou	38	1	30+1	1	1+1	0	5	0
34	DF	(Nigeria) NGA	Ola Aina	37	0	20+12	0	1+1	0	1+2	0
36	DF	(Brazil) BRA	Bremer	35	5	27	3	2	2	6	0
77	DF	(Italy) ITA	Christian Celesia	1	0	0+1	0	0	0	0	0
Midfielders
7	MF	(Serbia) SRB	Saša Lukić	36	1	20+10	1	2	0	2+2	0
8	MF	(Italy) ITA	Daniele Baselli	21	0	16	0	0	0	5	0
23	MF	(France) FRA	Soualiho Meïté	40	0	23+10	0	1	0	5+1	0
80	MF	(France) FRA	Ndary Adopo	2	0	0+2	0	0	0	0	0
88	MF	(Venezuela) VEN	Tomás Rincón	39	1	31+1	1	1+1	0	2+3	0
93	MF	(Uruguay) URU	Diego Laxalt	18	0	4+12	0	1+1	0	0	0
Forwards
9	FW	(Italy) ITA	Andrea Belotti	44	22	34+2	16	2	0	6	6
11	FW	(Italy) ITA	Simone Zaza	31	9	16+8	6	1	0	5+1	3
20	FW	(Italy) ITA	Simone Edera	13	1	4+9	1	0	0	0	0
21	FW	(Spain) ESP	Álex Berenguer	36	6	21+8	6	2	0	4+1	0
22	FW	(Italy) ITA	Vincenzo Millico	16	1	0+11	0	0+2	0	0+3	1
24	FW	(Italy) ITA	Simone Verdi	34	2	26+7	2	1	0	0	0
Players transferred out during the season
10	FW	(Spain) ESP	Iago Falque	5	0	1+3	0	0	0	1	0
14	DF	(Italy) ITA	Kevin Bonifazi	7	2	3	1	1	0	2+1	1
27	FW	(Italy) ITA	Vittorio Parigini	0	0	0	0	0	0	0	0

Last updated: 2 August 2020
Source: Competitions

=== Goalscorers ===
Rank	No.	Pos	Nat	Name	Serie A	Coppa Italia	UEFA EL	Total
1	9	FW	(Italy)	Andrea Belotti	16	0	6	22
2	11	FW	(Italy)	Simone Zaza	5	0	3	8
3	21	FW	(Spain)	Álex Berenguer	6	0	0	6
4	15	DF	(Argentina)	Cristian Ansaldi	4	0	1	5
4	36	DF	(Brazil)	Bremer	3	2	0	5
6	5	DF	(Italy)	Armando Izzo	1	0	2	3
6	29	DF	(Italy)	Lorenzo De Silvestri	0	1	2	3
8	24	FW	(Italy)	Simone Verdi	2	0	0	2
8	14	DF	(Italy)	Kevin Bonifazi	1	0	1	2
10	7	MF	(Serbia)	Saša Lukić	1	0	0	1
10	17	CB	(Ivory Coast)	Wilfried Singo	1	0	0	1
10	20	RW	(Italy)	Simone Edera	1	0	0	1
10	22	FW	(Italy)	Vincenzo Millico	0	0	1	1
10	33	CB	(Cameroon)	Nicolas Nkoulou	1	0	0	1
10	88	MF	(Venezuela)	Tomás Rincón	1	0	0	1
Own goal					2	0	0	2
Totals					45	3	16	64

Last updated: 29 July 2020

=== Clean sheets ===
Rank	No.	Pos	Nat	Name	Serie A	Coppa Italia	UEFA EL	Total
1	39	GK	(Italy)	Salvatore Sirigu	5	0	2	7
Totals					5	0	2	7

Last updated: 8 February 2020

=== Disciplinary record ===
No.	Pos	Nat	Name	Serie A			Coppa Italia			UEFA EL			Total		
No.	Pos	Nat	Name	Booked	(yellow card) (yellow-red card)	Sent off (straight red)	Booked	(yellow card) (yellow-red card)	Sent off (straight red)	Booked	(yellow card) (yellow-red card)	Sent off (straight red)	Booked	(yellow card) (yellow-red card)	Sent off (straight red)
25	GK	(Italy)	Antonio Rosati	0	0	0	0	0	0	0	0	0	0	0	0
39	GK	(Italy)	Salvatore Sirigu	4	0	0	0	0	0	0	0	0	4	0	0
4	DF	(Brazil)	Lyanco	1	0	0	0	0	0	0	0	0	1	0	0
5	DF	(Italy)	Armando Izzo	4	1	1	1	0	0	0	0	0	5	1	1
14	DF	(Italy)	Kevin Bonifazi	0	0	0	0	0	0	0	0	0	0	0	0
15	DF	(Argentina)	Cristian Ansaldi	5	0	0	0	0	0	2	0	0	7	0	0
17	DF	(Ivory Coast)	Wilfried Singo	0	0	0	0	0	0	0	0	0	0	0	0
29	DF	(Italy)	Lorenzo De Silvestri	1	0	0	0	0	0	0	0	0	1	0	0
30	DF	(Ivory Coast)	Koffi Djidji	1	0	0	0	0	0	0	0	0	1	0	0
33	DF	(Cameroon)	Nicolas Nkoulou	2	1	0	0	0	0	0	0	0	2	1	0
34	DF	(Nigeria)	Ola Aina	6	0	0	1	0	0	0	0	0	7	0	0
36	DF	(Brazil)	Bremer	2	2	0	0	0	0	3	0	0	5	2	0
7	MF	(Serbia)	Saša Lukić	4	0	1	0	0	0	2	0	0	6	0	1
8	MF	(Italy)	Daniele Baselli	3	0	0	0	0	0	2	0	0	5	0	0
23	MF	(France)	Soualiho Meïté	2	0	0	0	1	0	1	0	0	3	1	0
88	MF	(Venezuela)	Tomás Rincón	6	0	0	1	0	0	1	0	0	8	0	0
93	MF	(Uruguay)	Diego Laxalt	3	0	0	0	0	0	0	0	0	3	0	0
9	FW	(Italy)	Andrea Belotti	3	0	0	0	0	0	1	0	0	4	0	0
10	FW	(Spain)	Iago Falque	0	0	0	0	0	0	0	0	0	0	0	0
11	FW	(Italy)	Simone Zaza	3	0	0	0	0	0	2	0	0	5	0	0
20	FW	(Italy)	Simone Edera	0	1	0	0	0	0	0	0	0	0	1	0
21	FW	(Spain)	Álex Berenguer	3	0	0	0	0	0	1	0	0	4	0	0
22	FW	(Italy)	Vincenzo Millico	0	0	0	0	0	0	0	0	0	0	0	0
24	FW	(Italy)	Simone Verdi	2	0	0	0	0	0	0	0	0	2	0	0
27	FW	(Italy)	Vittorio Parigini	0	0	0	0	0	0	0	0	0	0	0	0
Totals				55	5	2	3	1	0	15	0	0	73	6	2

Last updated: 8 February 2020
