= Antonio Rosati =

Italian footballer (born 1983)

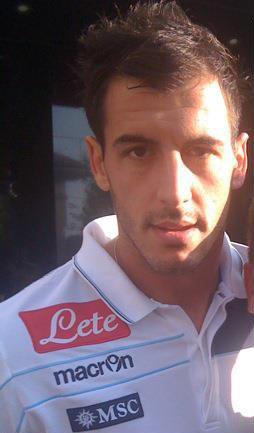
- Rosati with Napoli in 2012

Personal information
- Date of birth: 26 June 1983 (age 43)
- Place of birth: Tivoli, Italy
- Height: 1.95 m (6 ft 5 in)
- Position: Goalkeeper

Youth career
- Cisco Roma
- 2002–2004: Lecce

Senior career*
Years	Team	Apps	(Gls)
2004–2011	Lecce	116	(0)
2005–2006	→ Sambenedettese (loan)	8	(0)
2011–2015	Napoli	5	(0)
2013–2014	→ Sassuolo (loan)	2	(0)
2014	→ Fiorentina (loan)	3	(0)
2015	Fiorentina	0	(0)
2015–2018	Perugia	80	(0)
2018–2021	Torino	1	(0)
2021–2022	Fiorentina	0	(0)
Total		215	(0)
- * Club domestic league appearances and goals

Antonio Rosati (born 26 June 1983) is an Italian former professional footballer who played as a goalkeeper. He is currently working as goalkeeping coach for Turkish Süper Lig side Beşiktaş.

== Career ==
=== Lecce ===
Rosati's career began at Cisco Roma. He moved to Lecce in the 2002–03 season, making his first team debut in February 2005 in Lecce's 3–0 defeat of Chievo in Serie A. During the 2005–06 season, he was sent out on loan to Sambenedettese, with whom he played the eight remaining games of Serie C1, before returning to Lecce later in the season.

Rosati was first choice for Lecce during the 2006–07 season and the successful 2007–08 Serie B campaign, but only played four matches in 2008–09 when the team played in Serie A. The team was relegated back to the second division the following season and Rosati regained the first choice role after Francesco Benussi left the club. Lecce were promoted in first place.

Back in Serie A for the 2010–11 season, Rosati played all 38 league matches and was a key player as Lecce unexpectedly avoided relegation.

=== Napoli ===
Following his exceptional season with Lecce, Rosati joined Napoli for €3 million ahead of the 2011–12 season to serve as back up for first choice Morgan De Sanctis.

=== Fiorentina ===
He joined Serie A club Fiorentina on a free transfer.

=== Perugia ===
On 16 July 2015, he was signed by Serie B club Perugia for an undisclosed fee.

=== Torino ===
On 12 July 2018, Rosati signed with Torino on a one-year contract.

=== Return to Fiorentina ===
On 1 February 2021, Rosati returned to Fiorentina. Rosati announced his retirement from playing on 16 August 2022.

== Career statistics ==
=== Club ===
Appearances and goals by club, season and competition
Club	Season	League			National cup		Europe		Other		Total	
Club	Season	Division	Apps	Goals	Apps	Goals	Apps	Goals	Apps	Goals	Apps	Goals
Lecce	2004–05	Serie A	1	0	0	0	—		—		1	0
Lecce	2005–06	Serie A	1	0	—		—		—		1	0
Lecce	2006–07	Serie B	11	0	0	0	—		—		11	0
Lecce	2007–08	Serie B	20	0	1	0	—		0	0	21	0
Lecce	2008–09	Serie A	4	0	0	0	—		—		4	0
Lecce	2009–10	Serie B	41	0	2	0	—		—		43	0
Lecce	2010–11	Serie A	38	0	0	0	—		—		38	0
Lecce	Total		116	0	3	0	—		0	0	119	0
Sambenedettese (loan)	2005–06	Serie C1	8	0	1	0	—		—		9	0
Napoli	2011–12	Serie A	1	0	1	0	0	0	—		2	0
Napoli	2012–13	Serie A	4	0	0	0	6	0	0	0	10	0
Napoli	Total		5	0	1	0	6	0	0	0	13	0
Sassuolo (loan)	2013–14	Serie A	2	0	1	0	—		—		3	0
Fiorentina (loan)	2013–14	Serie A	3	0	0	0	1	0	—		4	0
Fiorentina	2014–15	Serie A	0	0	0	0	—		—		0	0
Perugia	2015–16	Serie B	42	0	2	0	—		—		44	0
Perugia	2016–17	Serie B	22	0	2	0	—		0	0	24	0
Perugia	2017–18	Serie B	16	0	3	0	—		0	0	19	0
Perugia	Total		80	0	7	0	—		0	0	87	0
Torino	2018–19	Serie A	0	0	0	0	—		—		0	0
Torino	2019–20	Serie A	1	0	0	0	0	0	—		1	0
Torino	2020–21	Serie A	0	0	0	0	—		—		0	0
Torino	Total		1	0	0	0	0	0	—		87	0
Fiorentina	2021–22	Serie A	0	0	1	0	—		—		1	0
Career total			215	0	14	0	7	0	0	0	236	0

== Honours ==
Lecce

- Serie B: 2009–10

Napoli

- Coppa Italia: 2011–12
