= Vincenzo Millico =

Italian footballer

Personal information
- Date of birth: 12 August 2000 (age 26)
- Place of birth: Turin, Italy
- Height: 1.73 m (5 ft 8 in)
- Position: Forward

Team information
- Current team: Desenzano
- Number: 10

Youth career
- 2006–2008: Atletico Mirafiori
- 2008–2012: Juventus
- 2012–2019: Torino

Senior career*
Years	Team	Apps	(Gls)
2019–2022	Torino	15	(0)
2021	→ Frosinone (loan)	4	(0)
2021–2022	→ Cosenza (loan)	20	(3)
2022–2023	Cagliari	15	(0)
2023–2024	Ascoli	10	(0)
2024–2025	Foggia	35	(4)
2025	Ternana	8	(0)
2025–2026	Casarano	18	(1)
2026	→ Team Altamura (loan)	11	(1)
2026–	Desenzano	1	(0)

International career^{‡}
2015–2016	Italy U16	9	(0)
2016–2017	Italy U17	4	(1)
2018	Italy U19	7	(0)
- * Club domestic league appearances and goals as of 23 August 2026 ‡ National team caps and goals as of 5 December 2018

Vincenzo Millico (born 12 August 2000) is an Italian professional footballer who plays as a forward for Serie C Group A club Desenzano.

== Club career ==
Born in Turin, Millico began playing football with local club Atletico Mirafiori and moved to Juventus at the age of 8. He then moved to Torino's academy at the age of 12. He made his professional debut for Torino in a 2–0 Serie A win over Atalanta on 23 February 2019. He scored his first goal on 1 August 2019, in a 4–1 win over Debrecen in the UEFA Europa League.

On 4 January 2021, Milico joined Frosinone in the Serie B on loan for the remainder of the season.

On 31 August 2021, he joined Cosenza on a season-long loan.

On 12 August 2022, Millico moved to Cagliari on a one-season contract, with the club holding an option to extend the contract by additional three seasons.

On 11 January 2024, Millico signed a contract with Foggia until 30 June 2025.

On 25 January 2025, Millico joined Ternana on a two-and-a-half-year contract.

== Career statistics ==
=== Club ===
As of match played 15 January 2021

Club	Season	League	League		Cup		Europe		Other		Total	
Club	Season	League	Apps	Goals	Apps	Goals	Apps	Goals	Apps	Goals	Apps	Goals
Torino	2018–19	Serie A	1	0	–		–		–		1	0
Torino	2019–20	Serie A	11	0	2	0	3	1	–		16	1
Torino	2020–21	Serie A	3	0	1	0	–		–		4	0
Torino	Total		15	0	3	0	3	1	–		21	1
Frosinone	2020–21	Serie B	1	0	–		–		–		1	0
Career total			16	0	3	0	3	1	0	0	22	1

== Honours ==
=== Club ===
Torino

- Coppa Italia Primavera: 2017–18
- Supercoppa Primavera: 2018
