= Simone Edera =

Italian footballer

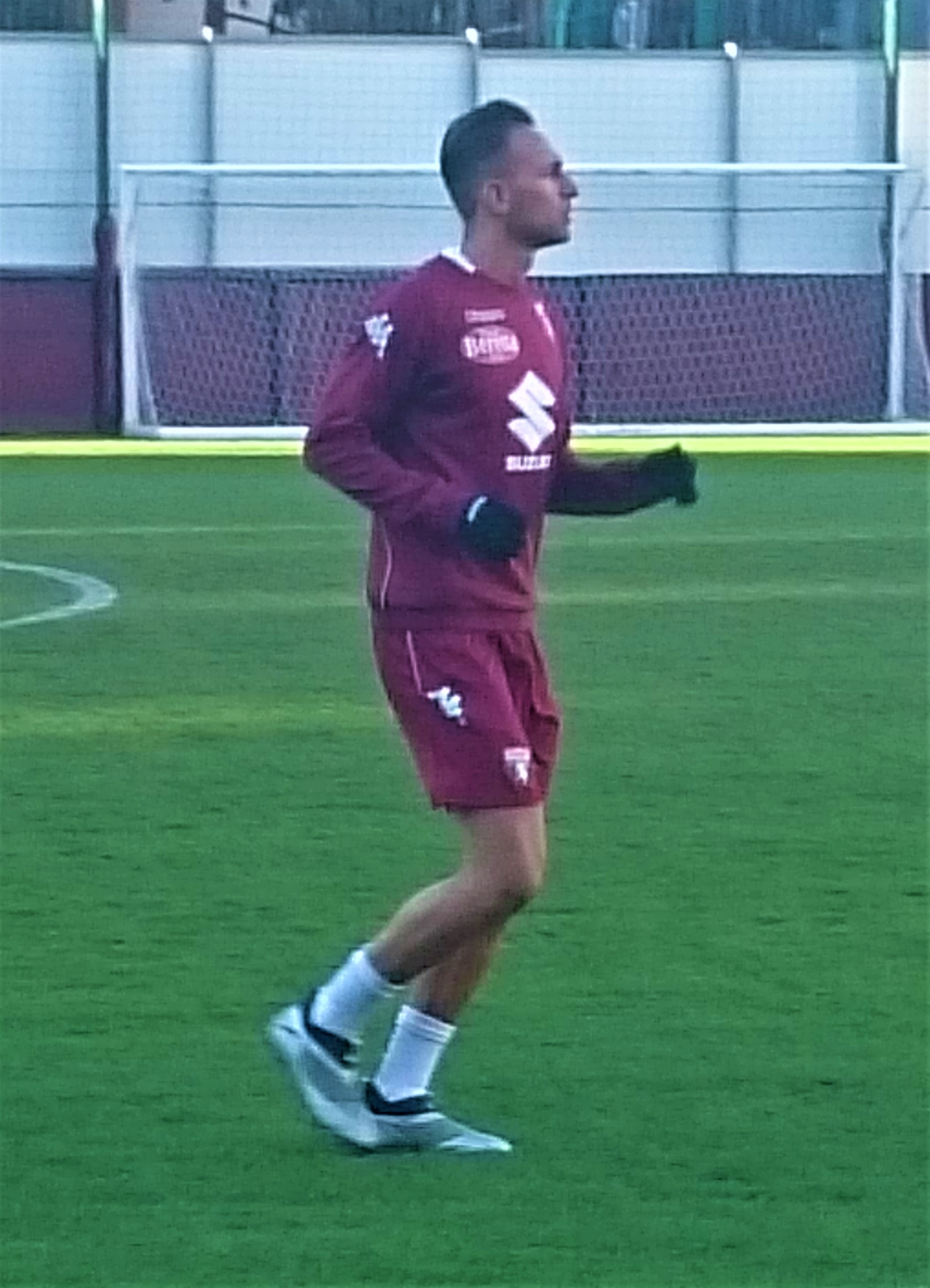
- Edera playing for Torino in 2019

Personal information
- Full name: Simone Edera
- Date of birth: 9 January 1997 (age 29)
- Place of birth: Turin, Italy
- Height: 1.74 m (5 ft 9 in)
- Position: Winger

Youth career
- 2004–2016: Torino

Senior career*
Years	Team	Apps	(Gls)
2016–2023	Torino	34	(2)
2016–2017	→ Venezia (loan)	6	(0)
2017	→ Parma (loan)	8	(1)
2019	→ Bologna (loan)	4	(0)
2021	→ Reggina (loan)	16	(2)
2023	Pordenone	10	(1)
2024	SPAL	13	(0)

International career^{‡}
2014–2015	Italy U18	7	(1)
2015–2016	Italy U19	9	(2)
2017	Italy U20	5	(2)
2018	Italy U21	3	(0)
Medal record
Men's football
Representing Italy
UEFA European Under-19 Championship
Runner-up	2016 Germany
- * Club domestic league appearances and goals as of 4 May 2024 ‡ National team caps and goals as of 11 October 2018

Simone Edera (born 9 January 1997) is an Italian professional footballer who plays as a winger.

== Club career ==
Born in Turin, Edera was scouted by Silvano Benedetti at the age of eight and brought to Torino to play with the Pulcini formation within the youth teams. He was promoted to the Primavera of Moreno Longo (as an underage player) during the 2014–15 season, winning the Campionato Primavera. He scored the decisive penalty in the final against Lazio.

He made his Serie A debut on 20 April 2016 at the Stadio Olimpico against Roma, replacing Alessandro Gazzi in the 95th minute in a 3–2 away defeat.

On 10 August, he was loaned to Venezia, with whom he played six games, before moving to Parma during the January transfer window. With the Ducali he won promotion at the end of the Lega Pro Promotion play-offs. After the loan expired he returned to Turin.

He started the 2017–18 season coming in at the 75 minute for Iago Falque in a 7–1 home win against Trapani in Coppa Italia on 11 August. On 11 December 2017, he scored his first goal in Serie A, in a 3–1 away victory against Lazio at the Stadio Olimpico. Nine days later, on 20 December, he scored his first goal in Coppa Italia, in the same venue, in a 2–1 away victory against Roma. On 25 June, he renewed his contract with Torino until 2023.

On 31 January 2019, Edera joined Bologna on loan until 30 June 2019. On 30 January 2021, he joined Reggina on loan until 30 June 2021.

Throughout the 2021–22 and 2022–23 seasons, Edera appeared on the bench for Torino three times and did not see any time on the pitch.

On 31 January 2023, Edera moved to Pordenone in Serie C and signed a contract until 30 June 2023.

On 21 December 2023, Edera signed a contract with SPAL until the end of the season.

== International career ==
He is a former member of the Italy under-18 and Italy under-19. He was part of the squad that finished as runners-up in 2016 UEFA European Under-19 Championship.

He made his debut for the Italy under-20 on 5 September 2017 in the Under-20 Four Nations Tournament, won 6–1 against Poland. On 9 November, he scored a brace against the Germany under-20, finished 2–2.

On 22 March 2018, he made his debut with the Italy under-21 in a friendly match against Norway.

== Career statistics ==
=== Club ===
As of match played 30 January 2021

Appearances and goals by club, season and competition
Club	Season	League			Cup		Europe		Other		Total	
Club	Season	Division	Apps	Goals	Apps	Goals	Apps	Goals	Apps	Goals	Apps	Goals
Torino	2015–16	Serie A	2	0	0	0	—		—		2	0
Torino	2017–18	Serie A	14	1	3	1	—		—		17	2
Torino	2018–19	Serie A	3	0	1	1	—		—		4	1
Torino	2019–20	Serie A	13	1	0	0	—		—		13	1
Torino	2020–21	Serie A	2	0	2	0	—		—		4	0
Torino	Total		34	2	6	2	—		—		40	4
Venezia (loan)	2016–17	Lega Pro	6	0	2	0	—		—		8	0
Parma (loan)	2016–17	Lega Pro	8	1	0	0	—		—		8	1
Bologna (loan)	2018–19	Serie A	4	0	0	0	—		—		4	0
Reggina (loan)	2020–21	Serie B	0	0	—		—		—		0	0
Career total			52	3	8	2	—		—		60	5

== Honours ==
Torino

- Campionato Primavera: 2014–15
- Supercoppa Primavera: 2015

Italy U19

- UEFA European Under-19 Championship runner-up: 2016
