= Tomás Rincón =

Venezuelan footballer (born 1988)

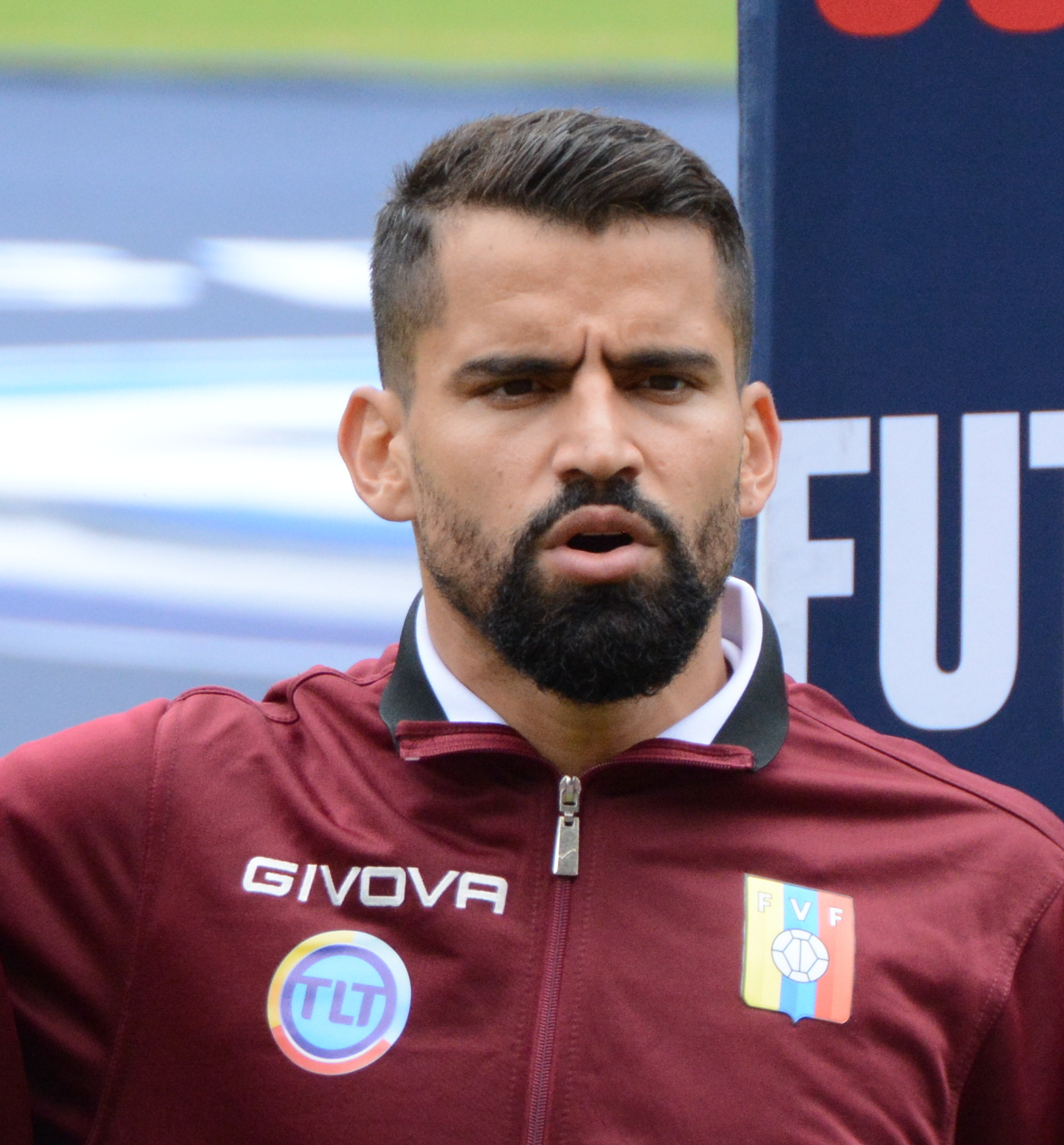
- Rincón with Venezuela in 2019

Personal information
- Full name: Tomás Eduardo Rincón Hernández
- Date of birth: 13 January 1988 (age 38)
- Place of birth: San Cristóbal, Venezuela
- Height: 1.77 m (5 ft 10 in)
- Position: Defensive midfielder

Youth career
- Monsenor Arias Blanco
- 2004–2006: Maracaibo

Senior career*
Years	Team	Apps	(Gls)
2006–2007	Maracaibo B		(2)
2007–2008	Zamora	33	(1)
2008–2009	Deportivo Táchira	18	(0)
2009–2014	Hamburger SV	106	(0)
2014–2017	Genoa	79	(3)
2017–2018	Juventus	13	(0)
2017–2018	→ Torino (loan)	36	(1)
2018–2022	Torino	109	(5)
2022	→ Sampdoria (loan)	17	(0)
2022–2023	Sampdoria	34	(0)
2023–2026	Santos	76	(2)
Total		521	(14)

International career
2005–2006	Venezuela U17	9	(1)
2006–2007	Venezuela U20	6	(0)
2008–2025	Venezuela	143	(1)
Medal record
Men's football
Representing Venezuela
Central American and Caribbean Games
Silver medal – second place	2006 Cartagena	Team
- * Club domestic league appearances and goals

Tomás Eduardo Rincón Hernández (Spanish pronunciation: [toˈmas riŋˈkon]; born 13 January 1988) is a Venezuelan former professional footballer who played as a defensive midfielder.

Rincón played for the Venezuela national team between 2008 and 2025, featuring at five Copa América tournaments. With 143 caps, he is the nation's record appearance holder.

== Club career ==
=== Early career ===
Born in San Cristóbal, Táchira, Rincón started his career with the youth sides of EF Monsenor Arias Blanco. In 2004, aged 16, he moved to UA Maracaibo, and made his senior debut during the 2006–07 season, playing with the B-team in the Venezuelan Segunda División and scoring two goals.

Rincón joined Venezuelan Primera División club Zamora in January 2007, and made his top tier debut on 25 March, starting in a 2–0 away loss against Carabobo. He became a regular starter in the 2007–08 season, and scored his first goal for the club on 30 September 2007, in a 4–0 home victory against his former club Macaribo. With Zamora, Rincón also took part in the club's first-ever continental appearance, playing in both matches of the 2007 Copa Sudamericana as they were knocked out by Ecuadorian club Olmedo.

Rincón left Zamora in July 2008 after scoring once in 33 league matches, and moved to Deportivo Táchira on a contract until 2010.

=== Hamburger SV ===
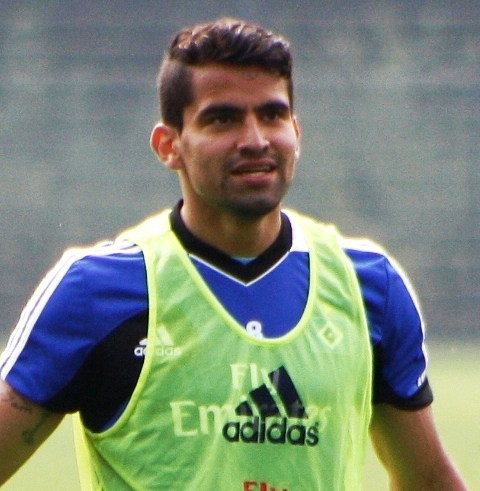
Rincón with Hamburger SV in 2013

Rincón, then 22 years old, played on loan for German Bundesliga club Hamburger SV. On 30 January 2009, he signed a contract until 31 December 2009. Rincón played his first match for Hamburg on 4 March 2009 against Wehen Wiesbaden in the DFB-Pokal. He made his Bundesliga debut on 4 April as a substitute in the 87th minute in a 1–0 victory against 1899 Hoffenheim. On 10 December 2009, Hamburger SV purchased him from his former club Deportivo Táchira. Rincón signed a contract until 30 June 2014.

=== Genoa ===
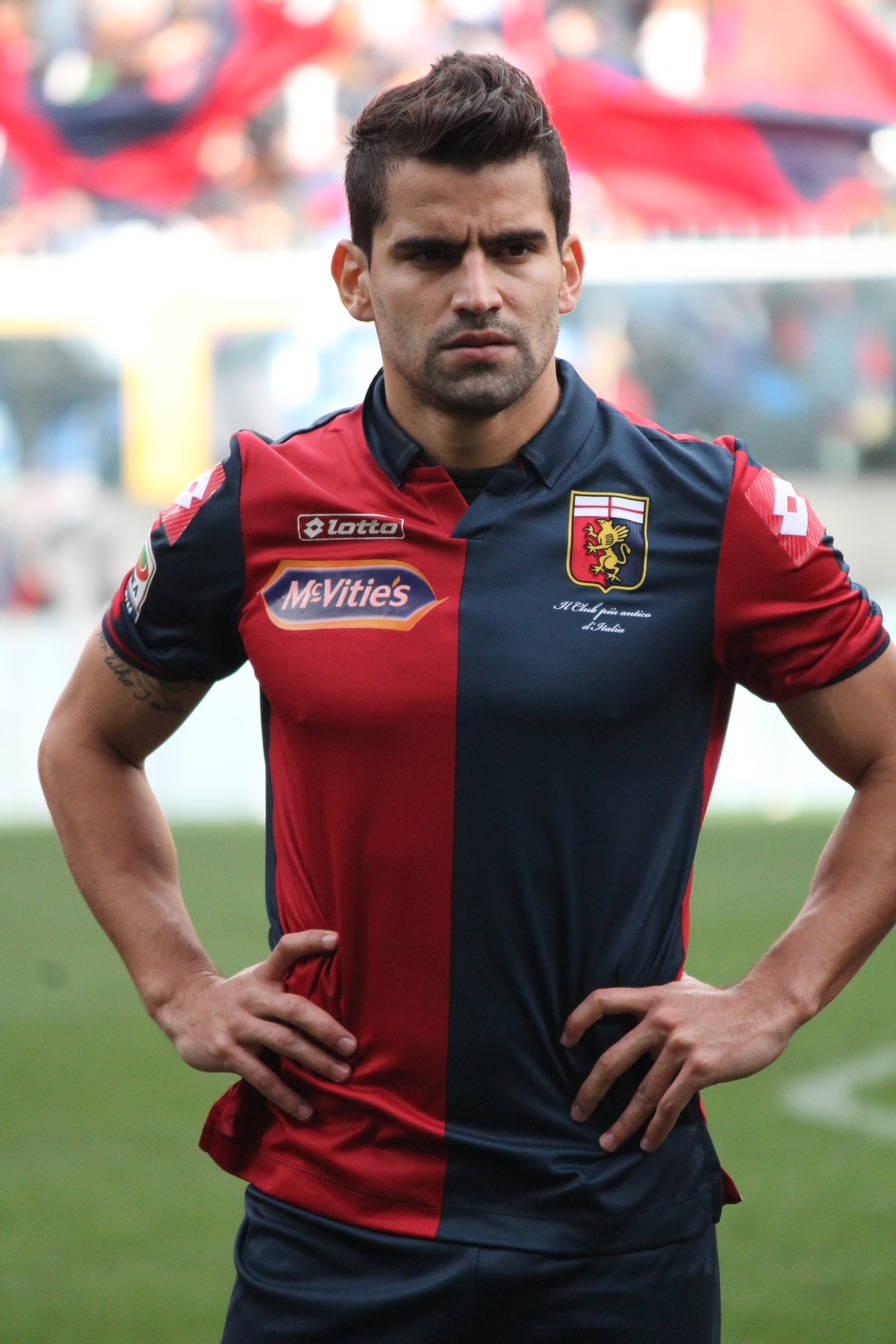
Rincón with Genoa in 2015

On 31 July 2014, Rincón was signed by Italian club Genoa on a free transfer. On 24 August, he played his first official match with the Gialloblu, a 1–0 away victory against Lanciano in third qualifying round of the Coppa Italia. He made his debut in Serie A on 31 August against Napoli. Although Genoa finished sixth place and qualified for the Europa League, it failed to obtain a UEFA license.

The following season, on 30 August 2015, Rincón made his debut in the league in the second round in a 2–0 victory against Hellas Verona. On 22 November 2015, he scored his first goal for Genoa in the game won against Sassuolo. Overall, he made 83 appearances and scored three goals with Genoa.

=== Juventus, Torino, and Sampdoria ===
In the middle of the 2016–17 Serie A, Rincón was linked with a move to defending Serie A champions Juventus during the January transfer window. He signed a three-and-a-half year contract with the Turin-based club on 3 January 2017 for a reported fee of €8 million, becoming the first Venezuelan ever to represent the Bianconeri, and was given the number 28 shirt. He made his Serie A debut 8 January, coming on as a substitute for Sami Khedira in a 3–0 home victory against Bologna. On 14 March, Rincón made his UEFA Champions League debut with the club — coming on as a substitute for Paulo Dybala in a 1–0 home victory against Porto — the second leg of the round of 16.

On 11 August 2017, Rincón moved to Torino on loan for the 2017–18 Serie A for €3 million, with a €6 million conditional obligation to buy. After the player had reached the condition on appearance for Torino, the club bought him outright on 6 January 2018. The deal was officially confirmed by Juventus on 5 February.

On 8 January 2022, Rincón joined Sampdoria on loan. On 5 July 2022, he returned to Sampdoria on a permanent basis with a one-year contract.

=== Santos ===
Rincón in action for Santos in 2024

On 15 August 2023, Campeonato Brasileiro Série A side Santos confirmed the signing of Rincón, pending on medical examinations. He made his debut for the club five days later, replacing Joaquim Henrique in a 2–1 home victory against Grêmio.

Rincón scored his first goal for Peixe on 1 October 2023, netting his club's second in a 4–1 home victory against Vasco da Gama. One week later, he scored the equalizer in a 2–1 away victory against rivals Palmeiras.

Despite being a part of the club which suffered the club's first-ever relegation from the top tier, Rincón agreed to a cut his wages to remain at the club in the Campeonato Brasileiro Série B. He spent the 2024 season as a backup to João Schmidt and Diego Pituca as the club achieved immediate promotion as champions, and switched between a first choice and back-up footballer in 2025. On 6 July 2026, having experienced limited playing time, Rincón announced his departure from Santos.

=== Retirement ===
On 16 September 2026, Rincón announced his retirement from professional football through a video posted to his social channels. He thanked his former teammates, coaches, and fans in the video.

== International career ==
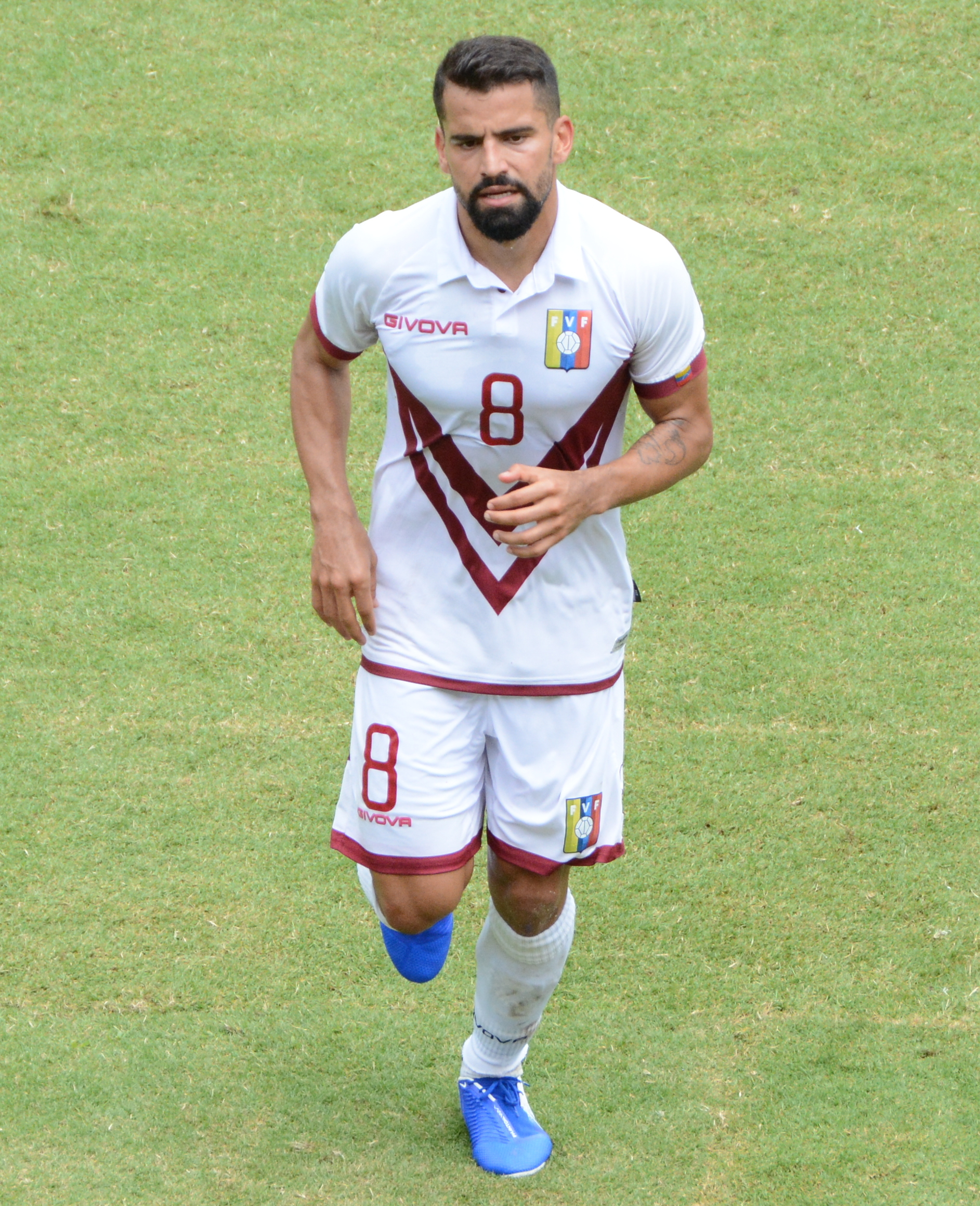
Rincón playing for Venezuela in 2019

Rincón represented Venezuela at under-17 level in the 2005 South American U-17 Championship, and at under-20 level in the 2007 South American U-20 Championship. He played his first senior international game for the full side on 3 February 2008, starting in a 1–0 friendly victory against Haiti at the Estadio Monumental de Maturín.

On 22 July 2011, Rincón was voted Adidas' Best Player at the 2011 Copa América in Argentina, receiving 65% of the total votes against ten candidates. Venezuela finished the tournament in fourth place. He also played at the 2015 Copa América, and the Copa América Centenario in 2016 with Venezuela, serving as his team's captain in the latter tournament.

Rincón scored his first international goal on 16 November 2018, netting the equalizing goal from the penalty spot in a 1–1 friendly away draw against Japan. He was also a member of the Venezuela national team that took part at the 2019 Copa América in Brazil, and made his 100th international appearance for Venezuela against Trinidad and Tobago on 14 October 2019.

On 11 September 2025, Rincón announced his retirement from the national team following his country's 6–3 home loss against Colombia during 2026 FIFA World Cup qualification, which led Venezuela to be eliminated from contention for the tournament.

== Style of play ==
Nicknamed el general (lit. 'The General'), Rincón was usually deployed in the centre, as a defensive midfielder in front of the back-line; he was also capable of playing as a full-back, wing-back, or wide midfielder along the right flank. He was also deployed in a box-to-box role on occasion, or as an offensive-minded central midfielder, known as the mezzala role in Italy.

== Career statistics ==
=== Club ===
Appearances and goals by club, season and competition
Club	Season	League			State league (Note: Includes Campeonato Paulista)		National cup (Note: Includes Copa Venezuela, DFB-Pokal, Coppa Italia, Copa do Brasil)		Continental		Total	
Club	Season	Division	Apps	Goals	Apps	Goals	Apps	Goals	Apps	Goals	Apps	Goals
Zamora	2006–07	Venezuelan Primera División	2	0	—		0	0	—		2	0
Zamora	2007–08	Venezuelan Primera División	31	1	—		2	2	2 (Note: Appearances in Copa Sudamericana)	0	35	3
Zamora	Total		33	1	—		2	2	2	0	37	3
Deportivo Táchira	2008–09	Venezuelan Primera División	18	0	—		0	0	—		18	0
Hamburger SV	2008–09	Bundesliga	1	0	—		1	0	2 (Note: Appearances in UEFA Cup)	0	4	0
Hamburger SV	2009–10	Bundesliga	17	0	—		0	0	11 (Note: Appearances in UEFA Europa League)	0	28	0
Hamburger SV	2010–11	Bundesliga	19	0	—		2	0	—		21	0
Hamburger SV	2011–12	Bundesliga	27	0	—		2	0	—		29	0
Hamburger SV	2012–13	Bundesliga	20	0	—		0	0	—		20	0
Hamburger SV	2013–14	Bundesliga	22	0	—		4	0	—		26	0
Hamburger SV	Total		106	0	—		9	0	13	0	128	0
Genoa	2014–15	Serie A	29	0	—		2	0	—		31	0
Genoa	2015–16	Serie A	33	3	—		1	0	—		34	3
Genoa	2016–17	Serie A	17	0	—		1	0	—		18	0
Genoa	Total		79	3	—		4	0	—		83	3
Juventus	2016–17	Serie A	13	0	—		3	0	3 (Note: Appearances in UEFA Champions League)	0	19	0
Torino (loan)	2017–18	Serie A	36	1	—		2	0	—		38	1
Torino	2018–19	Serie A	34	3	—		3	1	—		37	4
Torino	2019–20	Serie A	32	1	—		2	0	5	0	39	1
Torino	2020–21	Serie A	36	1	—		3	0	—		39	1
Torino	2021–22	Serie A	7	0	—		2	0	—		9	0
Torino	Torino total		145	6	—		12	1	5	0	162	7
Sampdoria (loan)	2021–22	Serie A	17	0	—		1	0	—		18	0
Sampdoria	2022–23	Serie A	34	0	—		3	0	—		37	0
Sampdoria	Sampdoria total		51	0	—		4	0	—		55	0
Santos	2023	Série A	16	2	—		—		—		16	2
Santos	2024	Série B	14	0	14	0	—		—		28	0
Santos	2025	Série A	17	0	12	0	2	0	—		31	0
Santos	2026	Série A	2	0	1	0	0	0	0	0	3	0
Santos	Total		49	2	27	0	2	0	0	0	78	2
Career total			494	12	27	0	36	3	23	0	580	15

=== International ===
Appearances and goals by national team and year
National team	Year	Apps	Goals
Venezuela	2008	13	0
Venezuela	2009	10	0
Venezuela	2010	6	0
Venezuela	2011	14	0
Venezuela	2012	4	0
Venezuela	2013	7	0
Venezuela	2014	2	0
Venezuela	2015	11	0
Venezuela	2016	14	0
Venezuela	2017	5	0
Venezuela	2018	5	1
Venezuela	2019	10	0
Venezuela	2020	3	0
Venezuela	2021	9	0
Venezuela	2022	9	0
Venezuela	2023	8	0
Venezuela	2024	9	0
Venezuela	2025	4	0
Total		143	1

Scores and results list Venezuela's goal tally first.

List of international goals scored by Tomás Rincón
No.	Date	Venue	Opponent	Score	Result	Competition
1.	16 November 2018	Ōita Bank Dome, Ōita, Japan	Japan	1–1	1–1	2018 Kirin Challenge Cup

== Honours ==
Juventus

- Serie A: 2016–17
- Coppa Italia: 2016–17

Santos

- Campeonato Brasileiro Série B: 2024

Venezuela

- Kirin Challenge Cup: 2019
- Copa América fourth place: 2011

Individual

- Adidas' Best Player of the Copa América: 2011

== See also ==
- List of footballers with 100 or more caps
