= Matteo Procopio =

Italian footballer

Personal information
- Date of birth: 4 July 1996 (age 30)
- Place of birth: Turin, Italy
- Height: 1.78 m (5 ft 10 in)
- Position: Left-back

Team information
- Current team: Derthona

Youth career
- –2016: Torino

Senior career*
| Years | Team | Apps | (Gls) |
| 2016–2021 | Torino | 0 | (0) |
| 2016–2018 | → Cremonese (loan) | 15 | (0) |
| 2018–2019 | → Südtirol (loan) | 11 | (0) |
| 2019 | → Reggina (loan) | 7 | (0) |
| 2019–2020 | → Lecco (loan) | 15 | (1) |
| 2021– | Derthona | 64 | (2) |
- * Club domestic league appearances and goals as of 16 February 2020

Matteo Procopio (born 4 July 1996) is an Italian professional footballer who plays as a left-back for Serie D side Derthona.

== Club career ==
He made his Serie C debut for Cremonese on 4 September 2016 in a game against Renate.

On 31 January 2019, he joined Reggina on loan. On 25 July 2019, he was loaned to Lecco.

== Honours ==
=== Club ===
Torino

- Campionato Primavera: 2014–15
