= Angelo Corsi =

Italian footballer (born 1989)

Personal information
- Date of birth: 18 May 1989 (age 37)
- Place of birth: Ferentino, Italy
- Height: 1.78 m (5 ft 10 in)
- Positions: Right back; winger

Youth career
- –2008: Pescara

Senior career*
Years	Team	Apps	(Gls)
2008–2012	Pescara	2	(0)
2009–2010	→ Monopoli (loan)	19	(0)
2010–2011	→ SPAL (loan)	19	(0)
2012	Pergocrema	3	(0)
2012–2014	Aprilia	48	(5)
2014–2022	Cosenza	216	(5)
2022	→ Vibonese (loan)	15	(1)
- * Club domestic league appearances and goals as of 24 April 2022

Angelo Corsi (born 18 June 1989) is an Italian footballer who plays as a defender.

== Club career ==
On 28 January 2022, he joined Vibonese on loan.
