= Christian Celesia =

Italian footballer (born 2002)

Personal information
- Date of birth: 22 January 2002 (age 24)
- Place of birth: Turin, Italy
- Height: 1.85 m (6 ft 1 in)
- Position: Defender

Team information
- Current team: Campobasso
- Number: 4

Youth career
- –2020: Torino

Senior career*
Years	Team	Apps	(Gls)
2020–2023	Torino	1	(0)
2021–2022	→ Alessandria (loan)	3	(0)
2022	→ Paganese (loan)	11	(0)
2022–2023	→ Potenza (loan)	4	(0)
2023	→ Messina (loan)	13	(0)
2023–2024	Mantova	20	(1)
2024–	Campobasso	50	(1)
- * Club domestic league appearances and goals as of 30 April 2026

Christian Celesia (born 22 January 2002) is an Italian professional footballer who plays as a defender for Serie C Group B club Campobasso.

== Career ==
Celesia grew up in the Torino youth system and made his debut for the club on 2 August 2020 against Bologna. On 13 August 2020, he signed his first contract with the club, until 2023.

On 17 August 2021 he went to Alessandria on loan. On 26 January 2022, he moved on a new loan to Paganese.

On 14 July 2022, Celesia signed with Potenza on loan for the 2022–23 season.

On 26 January 2023, he moved to Messina.

On 14 July 2023, Celesia signed a two-year contract with Mantova.

On 20 July 2024, he joined Campobasso.

== Career statistics ==
=== Club ===
As of 3 August 2020.

Appearances and goals by club, season and competition
Club	Season	League			Cup		Other		Total	
Club	Season	Division	Apps	Goals	Apps	Goals	Apps	Goals	Apps	Goals
Torino	2019–20	Serie A	1	0	0	0	0	0	1	0
Career total			1	0	0	0	0	0	1	0
