= Erick Ferigra =

Ecuadorean footballer (born 1999)

Personal information
- Full name: Erick Steven Ferigra Burnham
- Date of birth: 7 February 1999 (age 27)
- Place of birth: Guayaquil, Ecuador
- Height: 1.80 m (5 ft 11 in)
- Position: Centre-back

Team information
- Current team: AEL

Youth career
- –2012: Kelme
- 2012–2016: Barcelona
- 2017–2018: Fiorentina
- 2018–2019: Torino

Senior career*
Years	Team	Apps	(Gls)
2018–2021	Torino	0	(0)
2019–2020	→ Ascoli (loan)	13	(0)
2021–2022	Las Palmas	15	(0)
2022–2025	Paços de Ferreira	72	(1)
2025–	AEL	19	(0)

International career^{‡}
2020	Ecuador	1	(0)
- * Club domestic league appearances and goals as of 26 May 2026 ‡ National team caps and goals as of 9 October 2020

Erick Steven Ferigra Burnham (born 7 February 1999) is an Ecuadorian professional footballer who plays as a centre-back for Super League Greece 2 club AEL.

== Club career ==
Ferigra began his career with Kelme, then the Barcelona academy. In 2017, he moved to Italy with Fiorentina, then Torino, with Barcelona receiving 15% of the transfer fee.

Ferigra made his competitive debut for Torino on 12 August 2018 in a 4–0 home win against Cosenza in the Coppa Italia. On 5 August 2019, he joined Serie B club Ascoli on loan.

On 7 June 2021, Ferigra returned to Spain after signing a three-year contract with UD Las Palmas in Segunda División. On 23 August of the following year, he terminated his link and moved to Paços de Ferreira in Portugal.

== International career ==
He made his national team debut on 8 October 2020 in a World Cup qualifier game against Argentina.

== Personal life ==
Ferigra has a Spanish passport allowing him to count as an EU player.

== Honours ==
Torino

- Coppa Italia Primavera: 2017–18
- Supercoppa Primavera: 2018
