= Rizzo (surname) =

Rizzo (Italian pronunciation: [ˈrittso]) is a surname of Italian origin, denoting a person with curly hair or a variation of the surnames Ricci and Risso.

== Geographical distribution ==
As of 2014, 55.1% of all known bearers of the surname Rizzo were residents of Italy (frequency 1:786), 18.2% of the United States (1:14,059), 7.9% of Brazil (1:18,357), 5.1% of Argentina (1:5,960), 3.3% of Ecuador (1:3,422), 2.4% of France (1:19,532), 1.1% of Belgium (1:7,505), 1.0% of Canada (1:27,097) and 0.01% of Corfu, Greece (1:10).

In Italy, the frequency of the surname was higher than the national average (1:786) in the following regions:

1. Sicily (1:234)
2. Apulia (1:261)
3. Calabria (1:374)
4. Veneto (1:699)

In Ecuador, the frequency of the surname was higher than the national average (1:3,422) in the following provinces:

1. Los Ríos Province (1:694)
2. Guayas Province (1:1,410)
3. Galápagos Province (1:2,098)
4. El Oro Province (1:3,237)

== People ==
Notable people with this surname include:

- Francesco Rizzo da Santacroce (1505–1545), Italian painter, active mainly in Bergamo and Venice
- Adam Rizzo, American founder of the Solar Liberty
- Alanna Rizzo, American sports reporter
- Alberto Rizzo, fashion photographer and painter
- Alberto Rizzo (footballer) (born 1993), Italian football player
- Aldo Rizzo (1935–2021), Italian politician and magistrate
- Alessandro Minuto-Rizzo (born 1940), Italian diplomat, former Deputy Secretary General of NATO
- Alex Rizzo (1968–2002), American professional wrestler
- Alfredo Rizzo (1902–1991), French-born Italian actor, screenwriter and director
- Alfredo Rizzo (athlete) (1933–2023), former Italian middle-distance runner
- Angelo Rizzo (1926–2008), Italian Roman Catholic Bishop of Ragusa
- Anthony Rizzo, MLB baseball player
- Antonio Rizzo (footballer), Italian footballer
- Armond Rizzo (born 1990), American gay pornographic film actor
- Carmen Rizzo (born 1964), American producer, mixer, programmer, DJ, remixer and recording artist
- Diletta Rizzo Marin, Italian operatic mezzo-soprano
- Francesco Rizzo (footballer) (1943–2022), retired Italian football midfielder
- Francisco Rizzo (1831–1910), acting Spanish Governor-General of the Philippines
- Frank Rizzo, former mayor of Philadelphia, Pennsylvania, US
- Frank Rizzo Jr. (born 1940), American politician
- Frank L. Rizzo, Jr., politician and son of the aforementioned mayor
- Giacomo Rizzo (born 1939), Italian film actor
- Gianni Rizzo (1925–1992), Italian film actor
- Giuseppe Rizzo (born 1991), Italian footballer
- Giuseppe Rizzo (priest) (1863–1912), Italian priest, politician and journalist
- Gonzalo Nicolás Rizzo Sánchez (born 1995), Uruguayan football defender
- Helena Rizzo (born 1978), Brazilian chef and restaurateur
- Jessica Rizzo, pornographic actress and businesswoman
- Jilly Rizzo (1917–1992), American restaurateur and associate of Frank Sinatra
- Jo-Ann Rizzo (born 1965), Canadian curler
- Joe Rizzo (American football) (born 1950), Denver Broncos linebacker from 1974 to 1980
- Joe Rizzo (baseball) (born 1998), American baseball player
- John Rizzo (politician) (born 1980), American Democratic member of the Missouri Senate since 2017
- John A. Rizzo (1947–2021), American lawyer and intelligence officer
- John-Ross Rizzo, American physician-scientist
- Johnny Costa Rizzo (1912–1977), American outfielder in Major League Baseball
- Joseph Rizzo an 18th-century philosopher and theologian from Malta
- Juan Pablo Vojvoda Rizzo (born 1975), Argentine football manager
- Juan Salvador Rizzo (1906, date of death unknown), Argentine football player
- Linda Jo Rizzo (born 1955), American singer, composer and musical producer
- Luca Rizzo (born 1992), Italian professional footballer
- Luigi Rizzo, Italian naval officer and World War I hero
- Marc Rizzo, current lead guitarist of Brazilian Metal band Soulfly and formerly of Ill Niño
- Marco Rizzo, Italian politician
- Matteo Rizzo (born 1998), Italian figure skater
- Mauro Rizzo (born 1984), Italian footballer
- Michele Rizzo (born 1982), Italian rugby union player
- Mike Rizzo, DJ and music producer
- Mike Rizzo (baseball), baseball executive
- Nick Rizzo, Australian footballer
- Nick Rizzo (curler) (born 1961), Canadian curler
- Pat Rizzo, saxophonist for Sly & the Family Stone
- Patti Rizzo (born 1960), American professional golfer
- Pedro Rizzo, Brazilian mixed martial artist and kickboxer
- Rita Rizzo, an American Franciscan nun known as Mother Angelica, founder of the Eternal Word Television Network
- Rob Rizzo, NASCAR driver
- Robert Rizzo, American city manager who was convicted of wrongdoing in his official capacity
- Robert Hunecke-Rizzo (born 1971), German bass player, guitarist and drummer
- Roberto Rizzo (born 1961), former Italian football midfielder and current manager
- Simone Rizzo DeCavalcante (1912–1997), Italian member of the New Jersey Mafia, nicknamed "The Count"
- Sócrates Rizzo, Mexican politician
- Steve Rizzo, American motivational speaker, author, and former stand-up comedian
- Tatiana Rizzo (born 1986), Argentine volleyball player
- Todd Rizzo (born 1971), retired Major League Baseball pitcher
- Tony Rizzo (born 1940), Canadian politician
- Turu Rizzo (1894–1967), Maltese Olympic water polo player and world record swimmer
- Willy Rizzo (1928–2013), Italian photographer and designer

Fictional characters

- Betty Rizzo, character from the musical Grease and the popular film version played by Stockard Channing
- Frank Rizzo, the acerbic and profane character portrayed by Johnny Brennan
- Luther Rizzo, character from the television series M*A*S*H
- Stan Rizzo, character from the AMC television series Mad Men
- Enrico "Ratso" Rizzo, character from the film Midnight Cowboy
- Deputy Frank Rizzo, character from Reno 911!.

== Other uses ==
- Anthony Rizzo Family Foundation, a 501(c)(3) non-profit organization established in Parkland, Florida, in 2012 by Anthony Rizzo
- City of Bell scandal, one of the protagonists in a case of misappropriation of public funds in Bell, CA, in the late 2000s
- People v. Rizzo, a criminal case that set precedent for what constitutes an attempt to commit a crime
- Re Rizzo & Rizzo Shoes Ltd, a 1998 judgment from the Supreme Court of Canada regarding the priority of employees' interests

== See also ==
- Rizo, a surname
- Ríos (disambiguation)
