= Rizo (disambiguation) =

Rizo is a Spanish surname.

Rizo may also refer to:

== People ==
- José Rizo Castellón (1944–2019), a Nicaraguan politician
- Rizo Šurla (1922–2003), Montenegrin photographer
- Rizō Takeuchi (1907–1997), Japanese historian

== Other ==
- Gustavo Rizo Airport, a domestic airport serving Baracoa, Cuba
- Mirzo Rizo, a village in Tajikistan

== See also ==
- Rizzo (disambiguation)
- Rizos, a surname
