= Zizzo =

Zizzo is a surname. Notable people with the surname include:

- Anthony Zizzo (1935–disappeared 2006), American mobster
- Peter Zizzo (born 1966), American songwriter, music producer, musician and writer
- Sal Zizzo (born 1987), American soccer player

== See also ==
- Rizzo (surname)
- Zazzo
