= Heart & Hustle Award =

Major League Baseball award

- Logo for the Heart & Hustle Award
- Sport: Major League Baseball
- Country: United States & Canada
- Presented by: Major League Baseball Players Alumni Association (MLBPAA)

History
- First award: 2005
- Most recent: Bobby Witt Jr., Kansas City Royals (2026)

The Heart & Hustle Award is given out annually by the Major League Baseball Players Alumni Association (MLBPAA) to a current player who not only excels on the field, but also "best embodies the values, spirits and traditions of baseball."

Nominations are taken from the alumni of the teams, and the winner is selected via a letter ballot by the members of the MLBPAA. The most recent winner of the Heart & Hustle Award is Bobby Witt Jr..

== Winners ==
Key
Player (X)	Name of the player and number of times they had won the award at that point (if more than one)
†	Member of the Baseball Hall of Fame

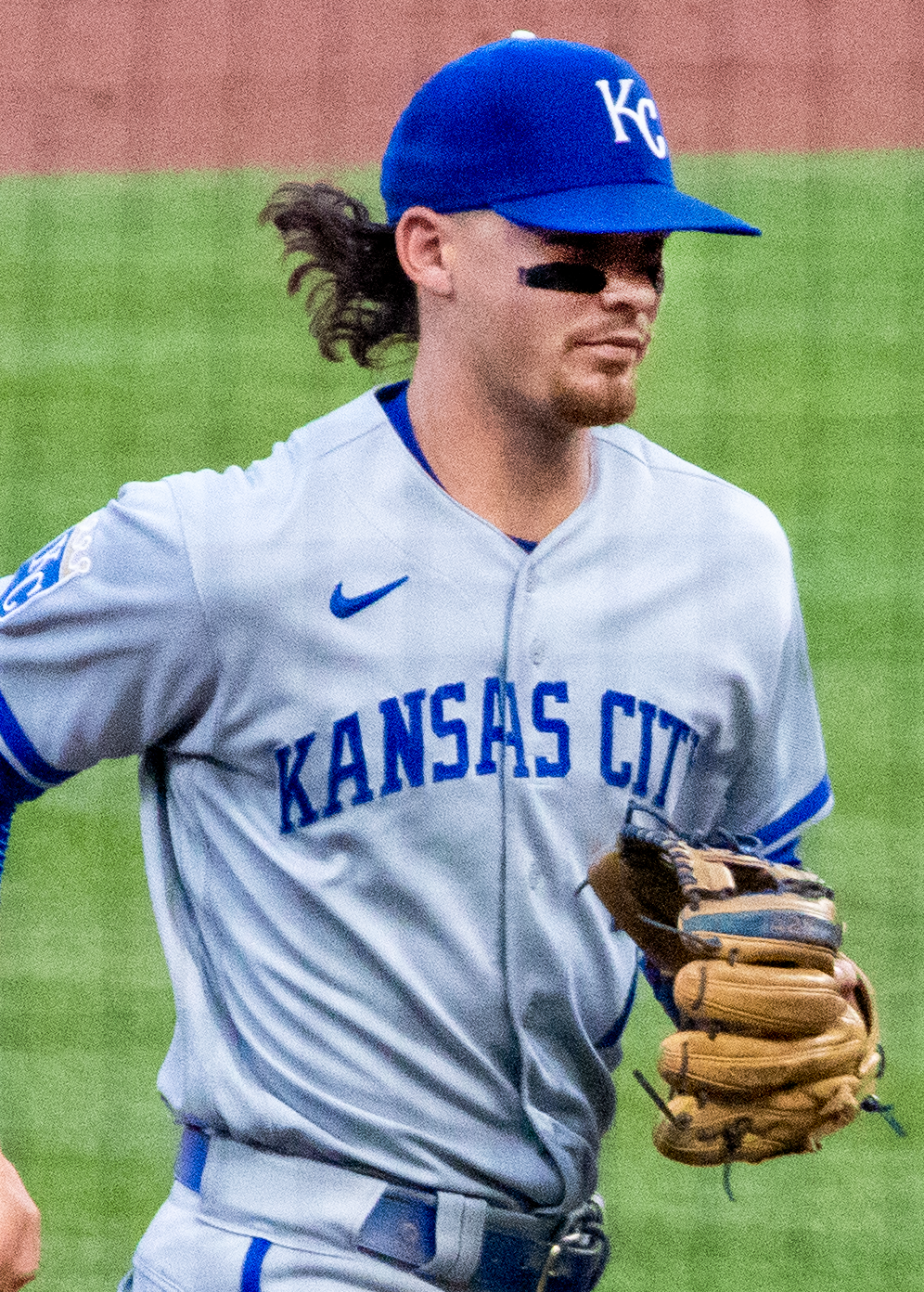
Bobby Witt Jr. is the most recent winner of the award.

Year	Winner	Position	Team	Ref
2005	David Eckstein	Shortstop	St. Louis Cardinals	
2006	Craig Biggio^{†}	Second baseman	Houston Astros	
2007	Craig Biggio^{†} (2)	Second baseman	Houston Astros	
2008	Grady Sizemore	Outfielder	Cleveland Indians	
2009	Albert Pujols	First baseman	St. Louis Cardinals	
2010	Roy Halladay^{†}	Pitcher	Philadelphia Phillies	
2011	Torii Hunter	Outfielder	Los Angeles Angels of Anaheim	
2012	Mike Trout	Outfielder	Los Angeles Angels of Anaheim	
2013	Dustin Pedroia	Second baseman	Boston Red Sox	
2014	Josh Harrison	Utility player	Pittsburgh Pirates	
2015	Anthony Rizzo	First baseman	Chicago Cubs	
2016	Todd Frazier	Third baseman	Chicago White Sox	
2017	Brett Gardner	Outfielder	New York Yankees	
2018	Mookie Betts	Outfielder	Boston Red Sox	
2019	Howie Kendrick	Infielder	Washington Nationals	
2021	Ozzie Albies	Second baseman	Atlanta Braves	
2022	Paul Goldschmidt	First baseman	St. Louis Cardinals	
2023	Marcus Semien	Shortstop	Texas Rangers	
2024	Bobby Witt Jr.	Shortstop	Kansas City Royals	
2025	Bobby Witt Jr. (2)	Shortstop	Kansas City Royals	
2026	Bobby Witt Jr. (3)	Shortstop	Kansas City Royals	

== Other baseball awards for spirit ==
- The Hutch Award is for the "active player who best exemplifies the fighting spirit and competitive desire to win".
- Players Choice Awards Marvin Miller Man of the Year Award – given to "the player in either league whose on-field performance and contributions to his community inspire others to higher levels of achievement."
- Players Choice Awards Majestic Athletic Always Game Award
- Lou Gehrig Memorial Award – given to a player who best exemplifies his character and integrity both on and off the field.
- Tony Conigliaro Award – given to a player who best overcomes an obstacle and adversity through the attributes of spirit, determination and courage.
- The San Francisco Giants have given the Willie Mac Award since 1980 to "the player on the San Francisco Giants who best exemplifies the spirit and leadership consistently shown by Willie McCovey throughout his long career."
- The Oakland Athletics have given the Catfish Hunter Award since 2004 to the "player whose play on the field and conduct in the clubhouse best exemplifies the courageous, competitive and inspirational spirit demonstrated by the late ... pitcher, Jim "Catfish" Hunter."
- The Los Angeles Dodgers have given the Roy Campanella Award since 2006 to the player who best exemplifies the spirit and leadership of Roy Campanella.

== See also ==
- Baseball awards
