= Cesare Bovo =

Italian footballer (born 1983)

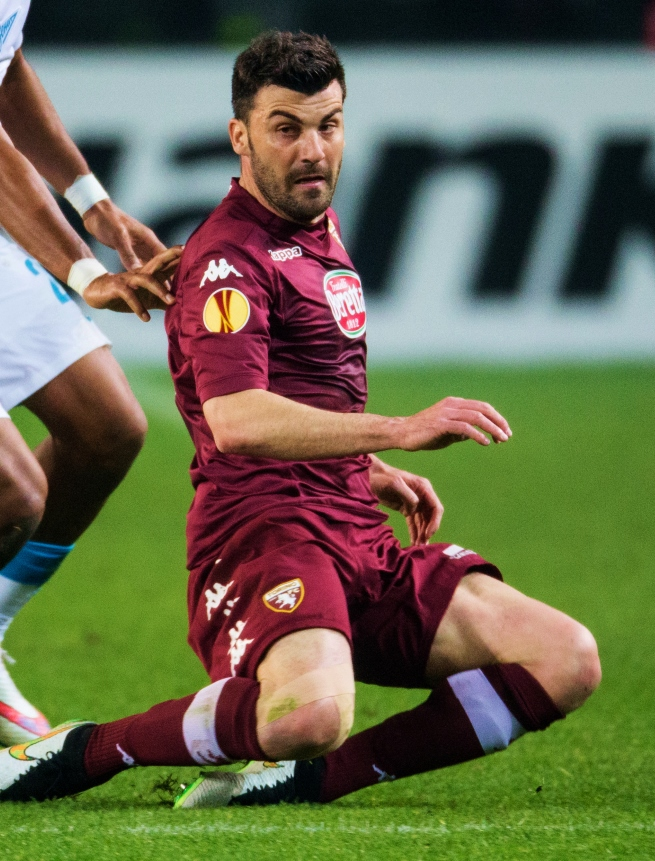
- Bovo in action during Torino–Zenit, 19 March 2015

Personal information
- Full name: Cesare Bovo
- Date of birth: 14 January 1983 (age 43)
- Place of birth: Rome, Italy
- Height: 1.81 m (5 ft 11 in)
- Position: Centre back

Team information
- Current team: Palermo (Under-17 coach)

Youth career
- 1999–2002: Roma

Senior career*
Years	Team	Apps	(Gls)
2001–2002	Roma	0	(0)
2002–2004	Lecce	30	(2)
2004–2006	Roma	22	(0)
2004–2005	→ Parma (loan)	31	(2)
2006–2007	Palermo	1	(0)
2007	→ Torino (loan)	7	(1)
2007–2008	Genoa	27	(0)
2008–2011	Palermo	89	(7)
2011–2013	Genoa	21	(0)
2013–2017	Torino	56	(2)
2017–2018	Pescara	18	(0)
2018–2019	Lecce	9	(0)

International career
2000	Italy U16	3	(0)
2000–2001	Italy U17	9	(1)
2001	Italy U19	7	(1)
2002–2003	Italy U20	8	(4)
2004–2006	Italy U21	27	(2)
Medal record
Representing Italy
Olympic Games
Men's Football
Bronze medal – third place	2004 Athens	Team competition
- * Club domestic league appearances and goals as of 22:59, 9 September 2019 (UTC)

Cesare Bovo Cavaliere OMRI (born 14 January 1983) is an Italian retired professional footballer who played as a centre back. He is currently in charge of the Under-17 team of Palermo.

== Club career ==
=== Early career ===
Bovo grew up playing in the AS Roma youth system, where he was part of the senior team in the 2000–01 season, while in the 2001–02 season he only played a game in the Coppa Italia: Brescia–Roma (3–0) on 8 January 2002.

In 2002, he was sold in co-ownership to Lecce (swapped with Mauro Rizzo), where he remained for two years and made his debut in Serie A on 5 October 2003 in Lecce–Brescia (1–4). On 2 May 2, 2004 he scored in a 2–1 home win against Internazionale, contributing to saving Lecce from relegation. With 2 goals in the league, he achieved his personal record of goals in a season. In June 2004, he was redeemed by Roma for €10,000, while Rizzo returned to Lecce for €40,000.

On 31 July 2004 he moved to Parma in temporary deal for €100,000, as part of the signing of defender Matteo Ferrari, where he showed good performances, such that Palermo bought half of his contract on 31 August 2004 for €1.5 million (in pure player exchange: Francesco Milano and Paolo Comi) Even this season he scored 2 goals in the league, equaling his record. The transfer of Bovo, Gianluca Curci, Simone Pepe and Valerio Virga were also accused uneconomical, and were compensation to Maurizio Zamparini for the acquirement of Palermo from Franco Sensi., which Roma denied, despite the sales of 4 players only received one thousand and five hundred euro cash plus half of the registration rights of two reserve players Comi and Milano. Roma did have a net short term debt to Palermo of €1.75 million on 30 June 2004 due to the transfer of Brienza–Bombardini, which paid by Roma in cash but counter-weighted on 30 June 2006 due to the full purchase of Bovo by Palermo .

On 1 July 2005 Bovo returned his hometown club, Roma in temporary deal for €750,000 (via the transfer of Massimo Bonanni to Palermo). His presence on the field was often limited by competition from Cristian Chivu, Philippe Mexès and Samuel Kuffour, such that the coach Luciano Spalletti often deployed him as a full-back.

After the insistence of the president of Palermo, Maurizio Zamparini, who had declared his intention to redeem at all costs the remaining contract of Bovo, the transfer of the defender in rosanero materialised in June 2006 for €2.05 million; while Virga returned to Roma for €50,000. Roma made around €200,000 less to the bid of Palermo.

In the final day of the transfer market of January 2007, he moved to Torino on a temporary basis. He played his first match for Torino on 24 February 2007 in Serie A against Chievo.

After the end of the loan he returned to Palermo, however, shortly after he was bought by Genoa, led by Gian Piero Gasperini, on 10 July 2007 in co-ownership bid for €2.85 million.

=== Return to Palermo ===
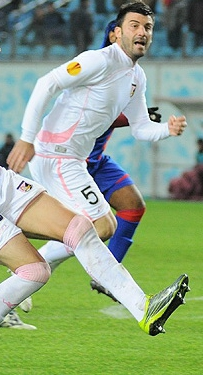
Bovo in action during CSKA Moscow–Palermo on 4 November 2010

On 19 June 2008 he was redeemed from Palermo for €4.5 million cash plus the transfer of Giuseppe Biava.

He made his debut with Palermo in the second game of the third round of Coppa Italia against Ravenna (1–2), while his first goal for Palermo came in the third day of the championship against Genoa, with a great shot from outside the box. Along with Simon Kjær and Andrea Raggi, his task was to replace the vacancies left by departures of Andrea Barzagli, Cristian Zaccardo and Leandro Rinaudo. He finished the season with only 28 appearances due to the number of cards received. He was Palermo's vice-captain along with Fabrizio Miccoli.

In the 2009–10 season, one of the best in his career, he marked his first goal 25 October 2009 in a home victory against the Udinese, on the ninth day of the season, with a deflected volley from the edge of the area. At the end of the season he suffered from metatarsalgia which required operation on 12 April 2010. Back on 24 April, he scored the first goal in a 3–1 win against AC Milan. He closed the season with a total of 29 appearances in the league (and 2 goals, a record equaled again) plus 3 appearances in Coppa Italia.

In the 2010–11 season, on 11 December 2010, he wore the captain's armband for the first time at home against Parma. On 22 January 2011, in Palermo–Brescia (1–0) of the 21st round, he scored the winning goal from a free kick in the 86th minute, equaling once again the personal record of goals scored in a season.

On 10 April 2011, in Palermo–Cesena (2–2), he made his 100th appearance with the shirt of Palermo; 86 in the league, 7 in Coppa Italia and 7 in European competition.

On 23 April, in a home game against Napoli, played on the 34th day, and won 2–1, he scored his third league goal with a penalty kick, thus overcoming his personal scoring record.

On 10 May, in the second leg of the Coppa Italia against Milan, he scored the 2–0 on a penalty kick, that ended 2–1. In the final, lost 3–1 to Inter, Bovo was disqualified due to his expulsion after the prior goal. He closed the season with 43 appearances and five goals between the league, Coppa Italia and Europa League.

In the 2011–12 season, after playing the two matches of the third qualifying round of the Europa League against the Swiss FC Thun, he left the rosaneri after a total of 108 appearances and 8 goals.

=== Return to Genoa ===
On 23 August 2011 he returned to Genoa in a loan move for €200,000 with an option to make the move permanent for €1.3 million.

He made his debut in Genoa–Atalanta (2–2) on the second day of the championship, held on 11 September 2011. He was injured early in the season and missed much of it.

On 13 January 2012 Genoa acquired full ownership of the player for pre-agreed €1.3M and sold half of the registration rights of goalkeeper Emiliano Viviano to Palermo for €5M.

He returned to the field 7 April 2012, the 31st round, replacing Emiliano Moretti in Novara–Genoa (1–1). In a match against Siena he sprained his right knee, tearing his outer meniscus, which prematurely closed his season with eight appearances.

On 18 November 2012, he scored an own goal during the Derby della Lanterna against Sampdoria ending 3–1 in favor of Sampdoria.

=== Return to Torino ===
On 9 July 2013 he moved back to Torino on a free transfer, six years after his previous experience in Turin. During the 2013–14 season, he played in 20 league games for Torino. On 2 June 2014 he renewed his contract until 2016.

He scored his first goal of the 2015–16 season on 31 October 2015, during the derby, scoring the momentary equaliser for Torino in a 2–1 loss to Juventus. On 22 November, he scored the winning goal against Atalanta, 1–0, in Bergamo. Three days later, he renewed his contract with the club until 2017.

=== Pescara ===
On 4 January 2017 he was sold to Pescara. He spent two seasons in Abruzzo.

=== Return to Lecce ===
On 12 September 2018, he made his return to Lecce.

== International career ==
Bovo was part of the Italy under-21 team, of which he was captain, that won the 2004 UEFA European Under-21 Football Championship. He scored the momentary 2–0 in the 81st minute during the final against Serbia. The match ended 3–0 for the Azzurri.

He also represented Italy at the 2004 Summer Olympics football tournament. During the quarterfinals, he scored the winning goal during extra time against Mali. He won a bronze medal.

In 2006, he disputed his second European Under-21 tournament, eliminated during the first round.

On 28 August 2010 he was called up to the senior national team by the new coach Cesare Prandelli, for matches against Estonia and Faroe Islands, during the qualifications for the UEFA Euro 2012 without ever taking to the field.

== Style of play ==
A central defender, Bovo was originally a left-back, but equally capable of playing in a back-line of 3 or 4 defenders. Bovo is noted for his ball control and is a free-kick specialist, possessing a strong shot from range.

== Coaching career ==
After retirement, Bovo joined Fabio Liverani's coaching staff at Lecce as a technical collaborator for the 2019–20 Serie A season. He successively followed Liverani at Parma for the 2020–21 Serie A season. On 8 June 2022, he signed for Cagliari as part of Fabio Liverani's staff, a position he left in December of the same year following Liverani's sacking.

In the summer of 2023, he returned to Palermo, joining Eugenio Corini's first-team coaching staff. He then stayed on under new manager Michele Mignani and eventually left by the end of the 2023–24 season.

On 1 April 2025, Bovo returned to work for Palermo, this time being appointed in charge of the Under-17 team.

== Career statistics ==
=== Club ===
As of 12 June 2019

Club	Season	League			Cup		Europe		Other		Total	
Club	Season	Division	Apps	Goals	Apps	Goals	Apps	Goals	Apps	Goals	Apps	Goals
Roma	2001–02	Serie A	0	0	1	0	0	0	—		1	0
Lecce	2002–03	Serie B	11	0	2	0	—		—		13	0
Lecce	2003–04	Serie A	19	2	0	0	—		—		19	2
Total			30	2	2	0	—		—		32	2
Parma	2004–05	Serie A	31+2	2+0	1	0	8	0	—		42	2
Roma	2005–06	Serie A	22	0	7	0	7	1	—		36	1
Total			22	0	8	0	7	1	—		37	1
Palermo	2006–07	Serie A	1	0	1	0	0	0	—		2	0
Torino	2006–07	Serie A	7	1	0	0	—		—		7	1
Genoa	2007–08	Serie A	27	0	0	0	—		—		27	0
Palermo	2008–09	Serie A	29	1	1	0	—		—		30	1
Palermo	2009–10	Serie A	28	2	3	0	—		—		31	2
Palermo	2010–11	Serie A	32	4	4	1	7	0	—		43	5
Palermo	2011–12	Serie A	—		—		2	0	—		2	0
Total			90	7	9	1	9	0	—		108	8
Genoa	2011–12	Serie A	8	0	0	0	—		—		8	0
Genoa	2012–13	Serie A	13	0	0	0	—		—		13	0
Total			48	0	0	0	—		—		48	0
Torino	2013–14	Serie A	20	0	0	0	—		—		20	0
Torino	2014–15	Serie A	15	0	0	0	6	0	—		21	0
Torino	2015–16	Serie A	21	2	3	0	—		—		24	2
Torino	2016–17	Serie A	4	0	2	0	—		—		6	0
Total			67	3	5	0	6	0	—		78	3
Pescara	2016–17	Serie A	10	0	0	0	0	0	—		10	0
Pescara	2017–18	Serie B	8	0	0	0	0	0	—		8	0
Total			18	0	0	0	0	0	—		18	0
Lecce	2018–19	Serie B	9	0	0	0	0	0	—		9	0
Career total			317	14	25	1	30	1	—		372	16

== Honours ==
=== Club ===
Roma

- Serie A: 2000–01

=== International ===
- UEFA European Under-21 Championship: Germany 2004
- Olympic bronze: Athens 2004

=== Orders ===
- 5th Class / Knight: Cavaliere Ordine al Merito della Repubblica Italiana: 2004
