= Anthony Rizzo =

American baseball player (born 1989)

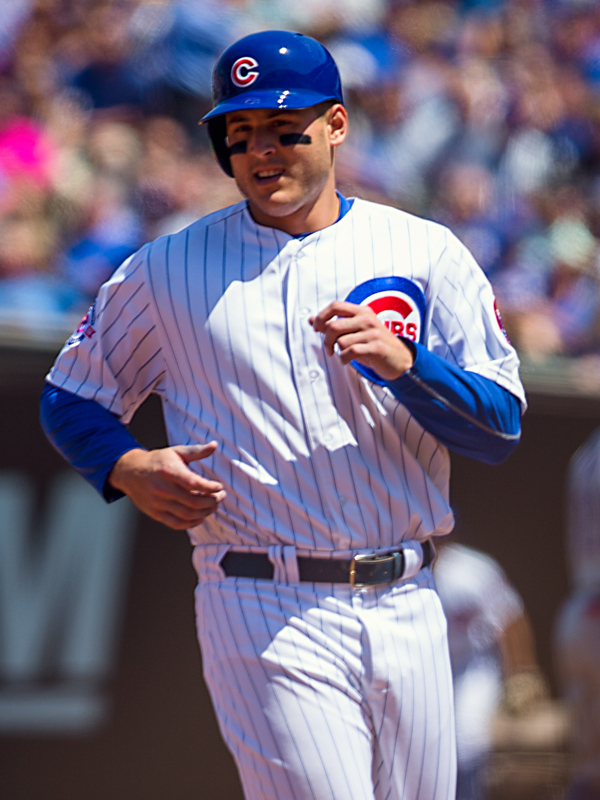
- Rizzo with the Chicago Cubs in 2016
- First baseman
- Born: August 8, 1989 (age 37); Parkland, Florida, U.S.
- Batted: Left Threw: Left

MLB debut
- June 9, 2011, for the San Diego Padres

Last MLB appearance
- September 28, 2024, for the New York Yankees

MLB statistics
- Batting average: .261
- Home runs: 303
- Runs batted in: 965
- Stats at Baseball Reference

Teams
- San Diego Padres (2011); Chicago Cubs (2012–2021); New York Yankees (2021–2024)

Career highlights and awards
- 3× All-Star (2014–2016); World Series champion (2016); 4× Gold Glove Award (2016, 2018–2020); Silver Slugger Award (2016); Roberto Clemente Award (2017)

Anthony Vincent Rizzo (born August 8, 1989) is an American former professional baseball first baseman. He played in Major League Baseball (MLB) for 14 seasons, primarily for the Chicago Cubs and was pivotal in the team's 2016 World Series victory. Rizzo is a three-time All-Star, and is the recipient of a Silver Slugger Award, four Gold Glove Awards, and a Roberto Clemente Award. A survivor of Hodgkin's lymphoma, Rizzo is also notable for his philanthropic endeavors, having started the Anthony Rizzo Foundation which partners with Lurie Children's Hospital. Rizzo won the Heart & Hustle Award in 2015.

Rizzo made his MLB debut in 2011 with the San Diego Padres before being traded to the Cubs in 2012. He developed into an All-Star player and spent 10 seasons with the Cubs before being traded to the Yankees in 2021. Rizzo played with the Yankees for three seasons through 2024, his final World Series appearance and professional season. A Cubs icon, Rizzo retired at Wrigley Field in 2025 and rejoined the team in an ambassador role.

== Professional career ==
=== Boston Red Sox ===
The Boston Red Sox selected Rizzo out of Marjory Stoneman Douglas High School in Parkland, Florida, in the sixth round of the 2007 Major League Baseball draft. He was heading for Florida Atlantic University before he was drafted and signed, with a $325,000 signing bonus. Rizzo played in the Red Sox organization with the Gulf Coast League Red Sox, Greenville Drive, Salem Red Sox and the Portland Sea Dogs. Rizzo's minor league career started at the age of 17 in 2007 in the rookie class with the Gulf Coast League Red Sox. In only 21 at bats, he hit .286/.375/.429 with 1 home run and 3 RBIs. In 2008 at the age of 18, Rizzo played in class A with the Greenville Drive in the South Atlantic League. In 83 at bats, he hit .373/.402/.446 with 0 home runs and 11 RBIs. Rizzo hit 12 home runs in 2009. In 2010, he hit a combined .260 with an on-base percentage (OBP) of .334 and a slugging percentage (SLG) of .480 along with 42 doubles, 25 home runs and 100 RBIs between stops at High-A Salem and Double-A Portland. Rizzo credited the easing of his swing and making better use of his legs for his power surge.

=== San Diego Padres ===
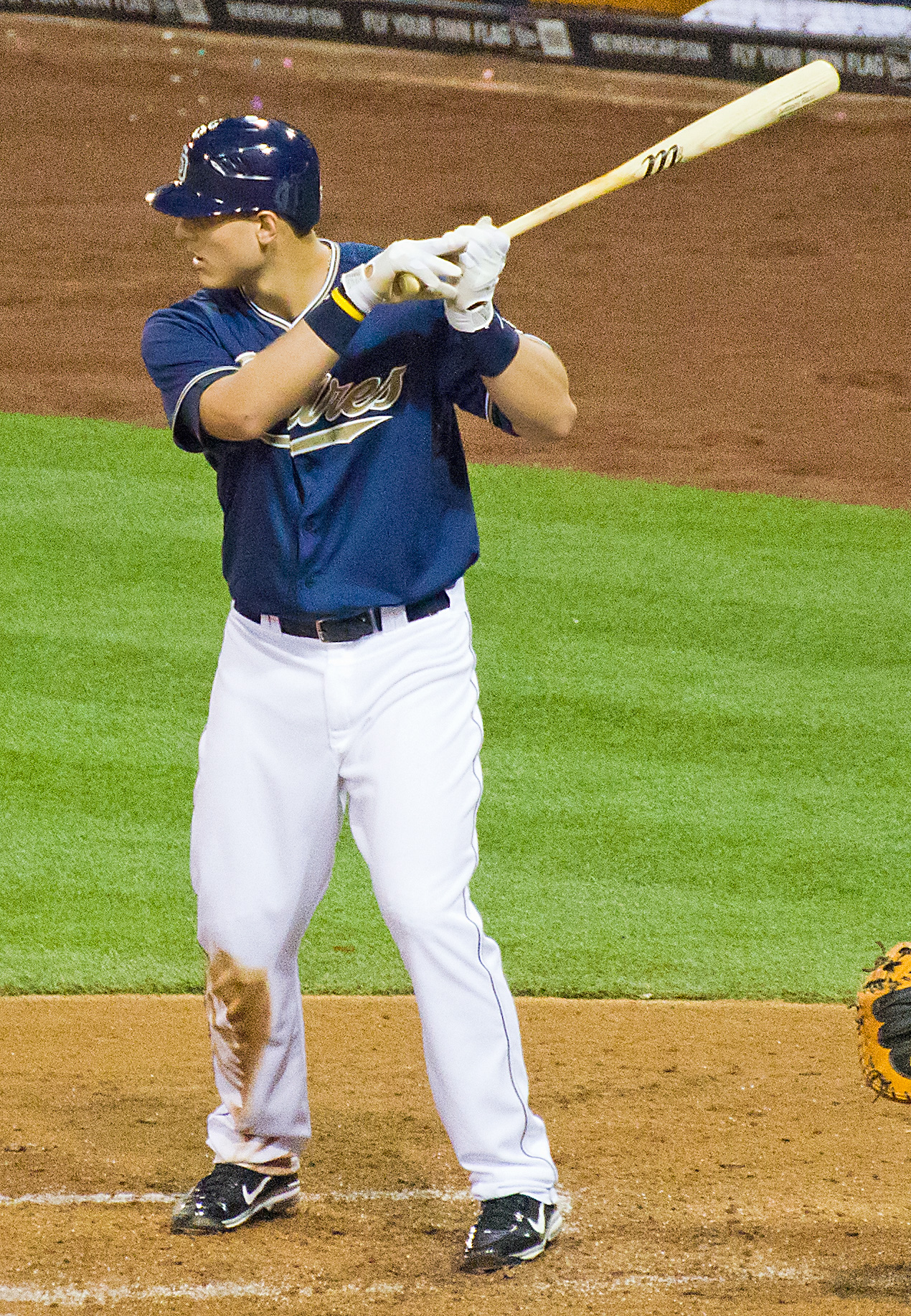
Rizzo batting for the San Diego Padres in 2011

On December 6, 2010, Rizzo was traded along with Casey Kelly, Reymond Fuentes, and Eric Patterson to the Padres for three-time All-Star first baseman Adrián González. Rizzo was considered the third best prospect (Kelly was #1) and the best power-hitting prospect in the Red Sox organization. Kevin Boles, Rizzo's manager at Salem, also previously managed González in the minors. Boles said, "Rizzo reminds me a lot of Adrián González...Rizzo is a bigger kid and has a little more power. Adrian is a little more of a contact hitter, but they had very similar styles of play...We thought very highly of Anthony Rizzo. He's going to be a heck of a player." Padres general manager Jed Hoyer expected either Rizzo or Kyle Blanks to eventually be the Padres major league starting first baseman.

The Padres invited Rizzo as a non-roster player to their major league camp for 2011 Spring training. He started the 2011 season in Triple-A with the Tucson Padres. In his first 15 games, Rizzo hit .452 with six home runs and 24 RBIs. In May 2011, The San Diego Union-Tribune wrote that Rizzo's debut in the Major Leagues might be delayed by the Padres despite the club's hitting deficiencies due to cost considerations created by the "Super Two" exception for salary arbitration eligibility. The team cited Rizzo's lack of experience above Double-A and his limited exposure to left-handed pitching as benefits of his continuing to play in Tucson.

Rizzo was called up to the majors after hitting .365 with an OPS of 1.159 along with 16 home runs and 63 RBI in 200 at-bats over 52 games in Tucson. The San Diego Union-Tribune called Rizzo "the most celebrated Padres call-up" since Roberto Alomar debuted with the team in 1988. Rizzo's promotion was prompted by the Padres' inadequate offensive production and fielding play of veterans at first base. In his debut on June 9, 2011, against the Washington Nationals, Rizzo struck out in his first at-bat, but then proceeded to hit a triple and score a run, helping the Padres to a 7–3 victory. He hit his first home run on June 11 against John Lannan. After three games he was 3-for-7 with a double, triple and a home run, while he demonstrated patience in drawing four walks for a .667 on-base percentage (OBP). On July 21, 2011, Rizzo was demoted back to Triple-A, and Blanks was promoted. Rizzo had struggled with only a .143 batting average and 1 home run, striking out 36 times in 98 at-bats. Hoyer said Rizzo "worked hard, never made excuses, and endeared himself to his teammates" during his initial stint in the majors. Rizzo was recalled to the majors on September 4 after finishing the season at Tucson batting .331 with 26 homers and 101 RBI in 93 games. He finished his first season in San Diego hitting only .141 with 46 strikeouts in 128 at-bats. Hoyer believed Rizzo would be the starting first baseman for the Padres in 2012 with Jesús Guzmán as the second option. However, Yonder Alonso moved ahead of Rizzo on the team's depth chart after he was acquired by the Padres in December 2011 in a trade for Mat Latos.

=== Chicago Cubs ===
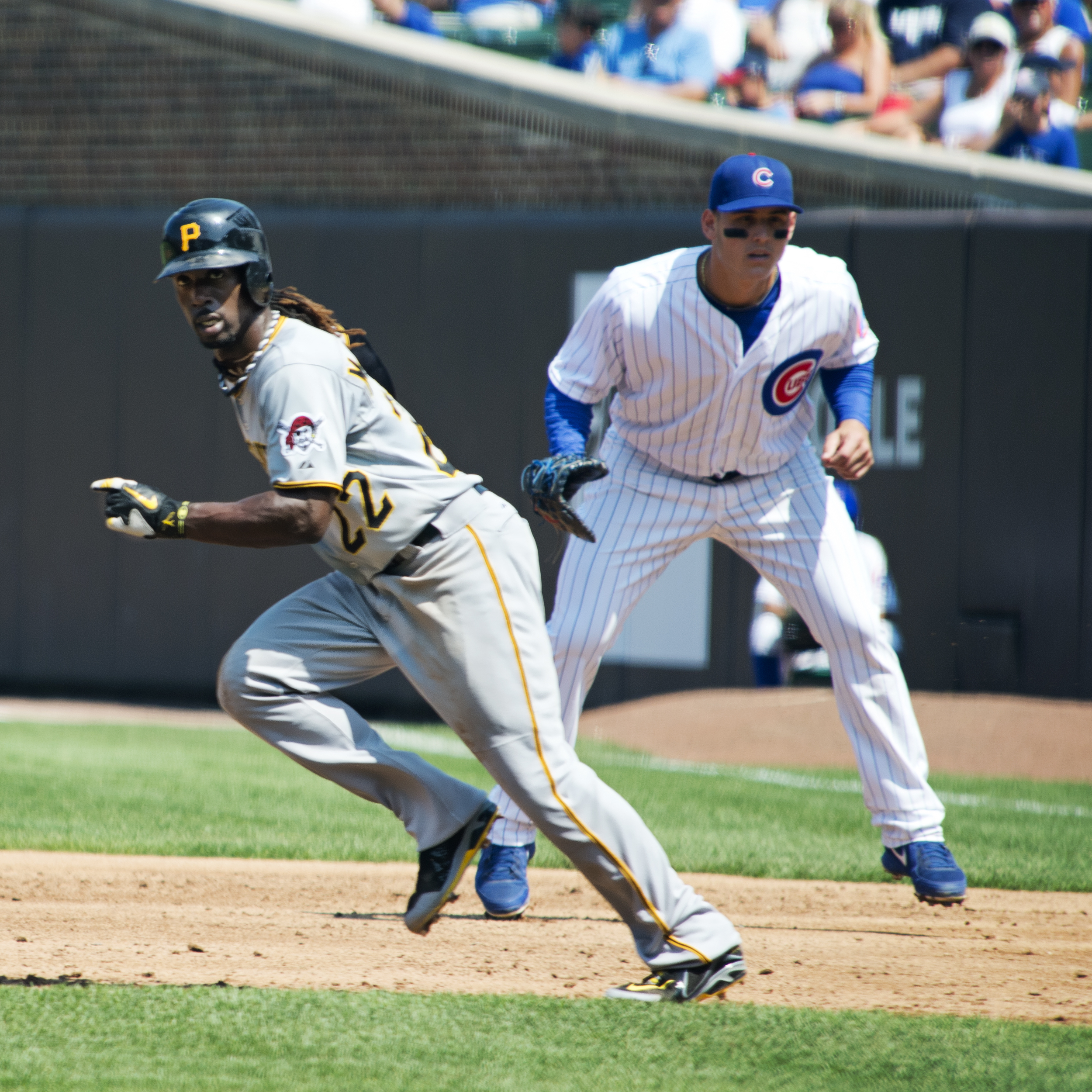
Rizzo (right) playing first base for the Chicago Cubs in 2012

On January 6, 2012, the Padres traded Rizzo and right-handed starting pitcher Zach Cates to the Chicago Cubs in exchange for right-handed starting pitcher Andrew Cashner and outfielder Kyung-Min Na. The deal was negotiated by Jed Hoyer, the Cubs' general manager. Hoyer had also drafted Rizzo while working as an assistant general manager for the Red Sox, and later acquired Rizzo while he was the Padres' general manager. He blamed himself for calling up Rizzo to the majors too early in San Diego.

==== 2012 ====
Rizzo started the 2012 season with the Triple-A Iowa Cubs. He again excelled in the minor leagues, batting .342 with 23 home runs and 62 RBIs before being recalled by the Cubs on June 26. Similar to his call-up in San Diego, he was expected to help a struggling offense.

He became the first player in Cubs history to have three game-winning RBIs in his first five games with the team. He hit seven homers in July, the most by a Cubs rookie in a calendar month since Mel Hall hit nine in August 1983. He also led National League (NL) rookies that month in homers, hits (32), RBIs (17), and total bases (55). He ranked second among NL rookies in runs scored (14), and he was third with a .330 batting average, .375 on-base percentage, and .567 slugging percentage. He was named the league's July Rookie of the Month.

==== 2013 ====
On May 12, 2013, Rizzo agreed to a seven-year, $41 million contract. The deal included two club options that could extend the contract to nine years and $73 million. He was named as the Cubs' finalist for the National Heart and Hustle Award, and he was also named the Cubs' finalist for the Roberto Clemente Award. Rizzo placed 2nd for the Gold Glove award for first basemen. Despite having an off year in 2013, Rizzo showed good power, belting 23 homers and 40 doubles in 606 at bats with a .233 batting average.

==== 2014 ====
Rizzo had his fifth multi-homer game on May 30, and his second career walk-off home run on June 6. Rizzo was voted into the All-Star game via the final vote by fans along with White Sox pitcher Chris Sale. Rizzo joined teammate Starlin Castro in Minneapolis for the All-Star game. In late July, Rizzo won his first Player of the Week award. In mid-September, Rizzo became the youngest player to receive the Branch Rickey Award as "a strong role model for young people". Rizzo finished the season with a combined on-base and slugging percentage of .913 (3rd in the NL), 32 home runs (2nd in the NL) and an at-bats per HR percentage of 16.4 (2nd in the NL), led the majors in hit by pitch (15), and placed 10th in the National League MVP voting.

==== 2015 ====
Rizzo was elected on the players' ballot for the 2015 All-Star Team. 2015 was the second consecutive year that he played in the game. He also competed in the Home Run Derby for the first time in his career but lost in the first round to Josh Donaldson. Rizzo hit his 100th career home run and 300th RBI on September 8, against Cardinals pitcher Michael Wacha. Rizzo was hit by a pitch 30 times in 2015, leading the major leagues, and joined Don Baylor as the only other member of the 30HR–30HBP club. Rizzo finished the regular season with a .278 batting average, 31 home runs, 38 doubles, and 101 RBI in 701 plate appearances, and led the major leagues in hit by pitch, with 30. He placed 4th in National League MVP voting. Rizzo took home the MLBPAA Heart and Hustle Award, awarded to a player that has a strong desire for the game and has a belief, spirit, and traditions that symbolize the game of baseball. Rizzo also received the same award from the Cubs organization, his second such award.

==== 2016 ====
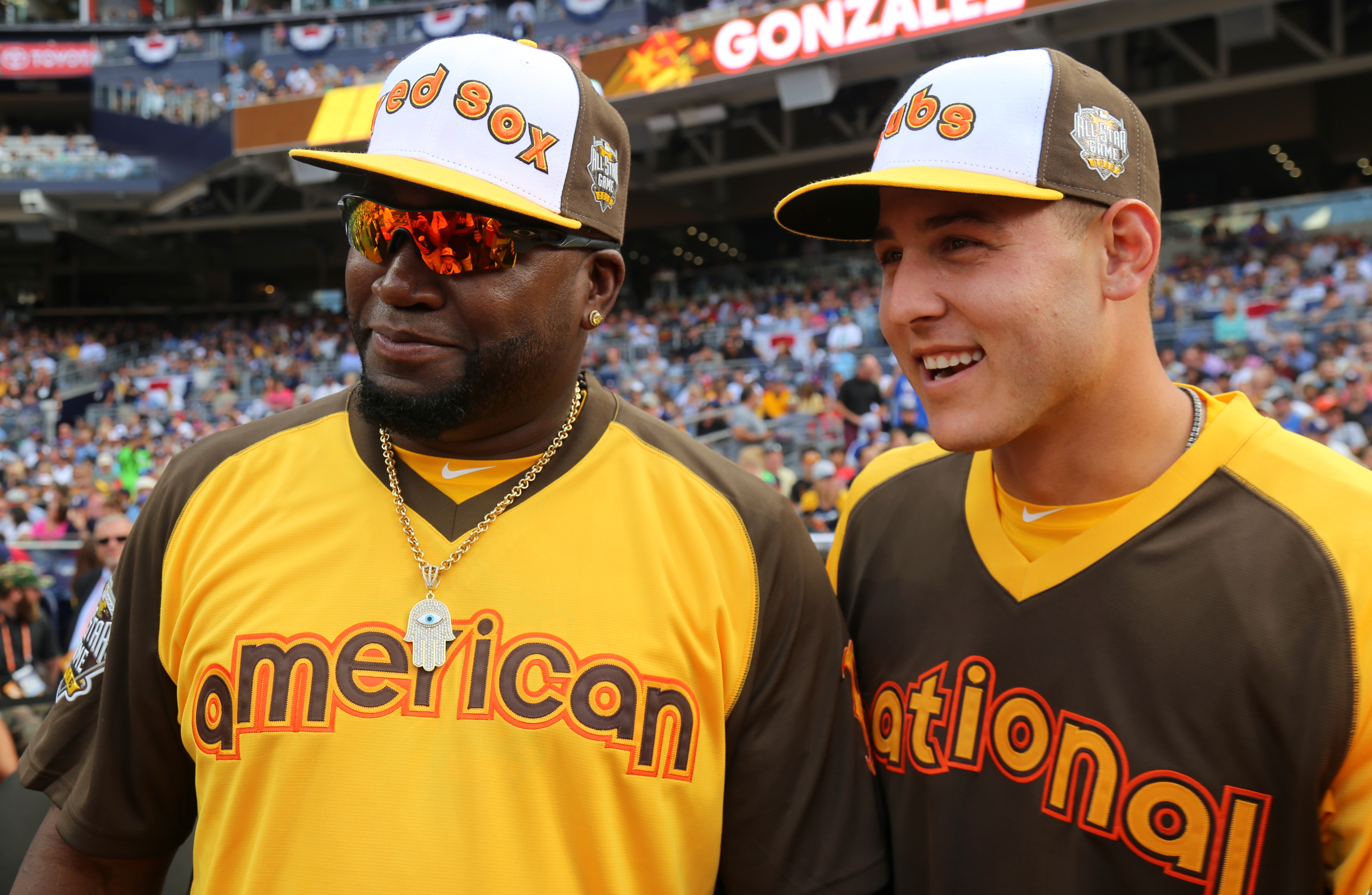
Rizzo (right) with David Ortiz during 2016 Home Run Derby

Rizzo started as the first baseman at the 2016 All-Star game, receiving the most fan votes in the National League. By the end of the year, Rizzo had become one of three players, and the first left-handed player, in Cubs history to hit over 40 doubles and 30 home runs in the same year. Rizzo played in 155 games with 583 at bats and scored 94 runs. He was hit by a pitch 16 times, had 170 hits with 43 doubles, 4 triples, 32 home runs, and 109 RBIs. He finished the year with a batting average of .292 and was fourth in the voting for National League Most Valuable Player. Rizzo's fielding excellence was rewarded with a Gold Glove Award. Rizzo was one of six finalists for the Marvin Miller Man of the Year Award and was the Cubs nominee for the Roberto Clemente Award.

After an extremely slow start in the postseason, Rizzo broke out of his slump in the NLCS. He was an integral part of the last three victories over the Los Angeles Dodgers and led the Cubs to their first World Series appearance since 1945. In the 2016 World Series, Rizzo scored 7 runs and had 5 RBIs, and helped the Cubs win their first World Series title since 1908. He also won the Esurance MLB Award for "Best Social Media Personality" and for "Best Play: Defense". Rizzo's defense saved 11 runs for the Cubs, which led all MLB first basemen, and he was recipient of his first Fielding Bible Award and the Wilson Defensive Player of the Year Award. He also won the fan vote for the Platinum Glove Award. Rizzo took home two more awards for the year. One was the Silver Slugger; It's awarded to the best offensive producers at each position in the field in each league. It was Rizzo's only Silver Slugger. The second was the MLBPAA Cubs Heart and Hustle Award. It was Rizzo's third time receiving the award from the Cubs organization.

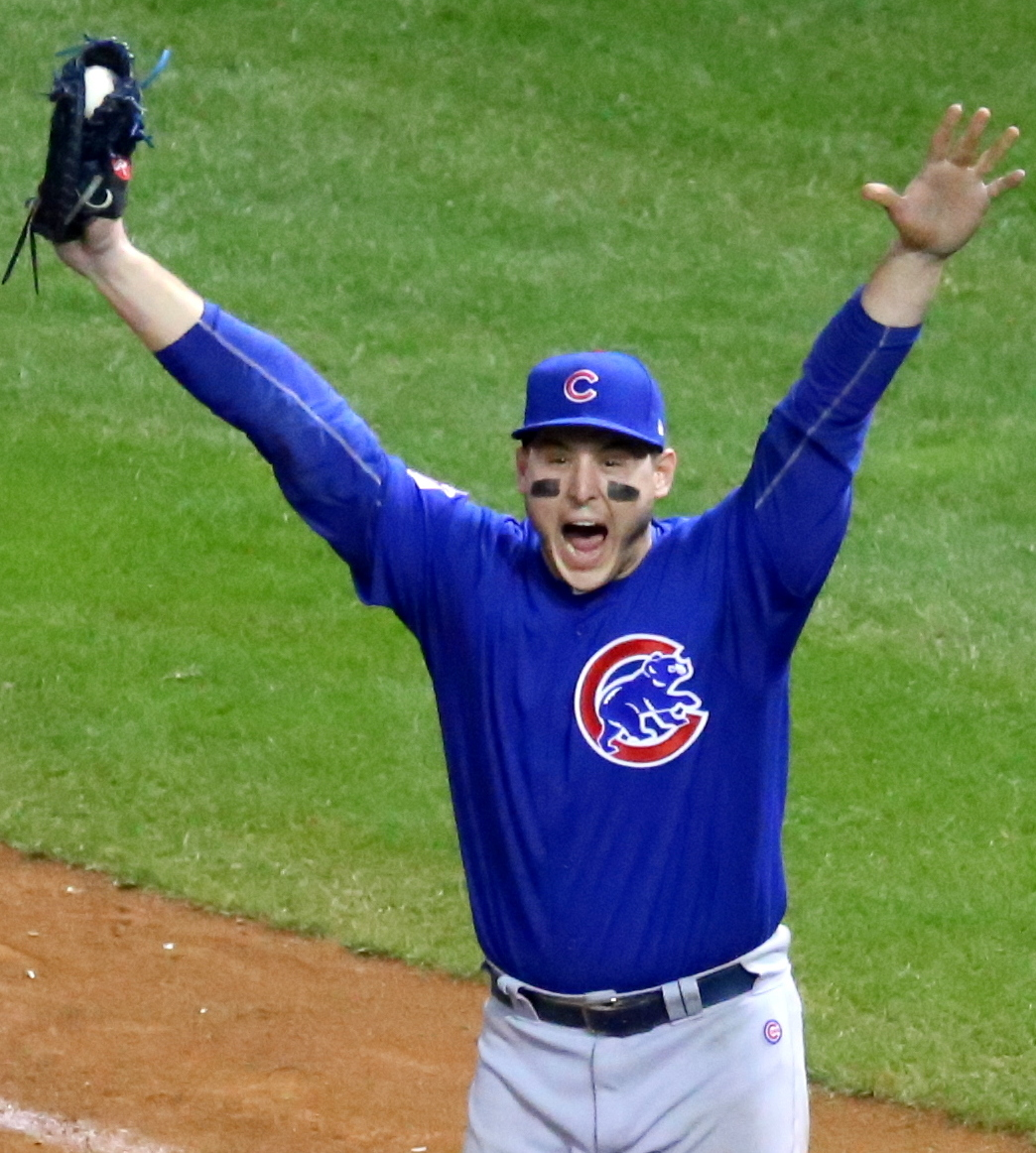
Rizzo celebrates the final out of the 2016 World Series.

==== 2017 ====
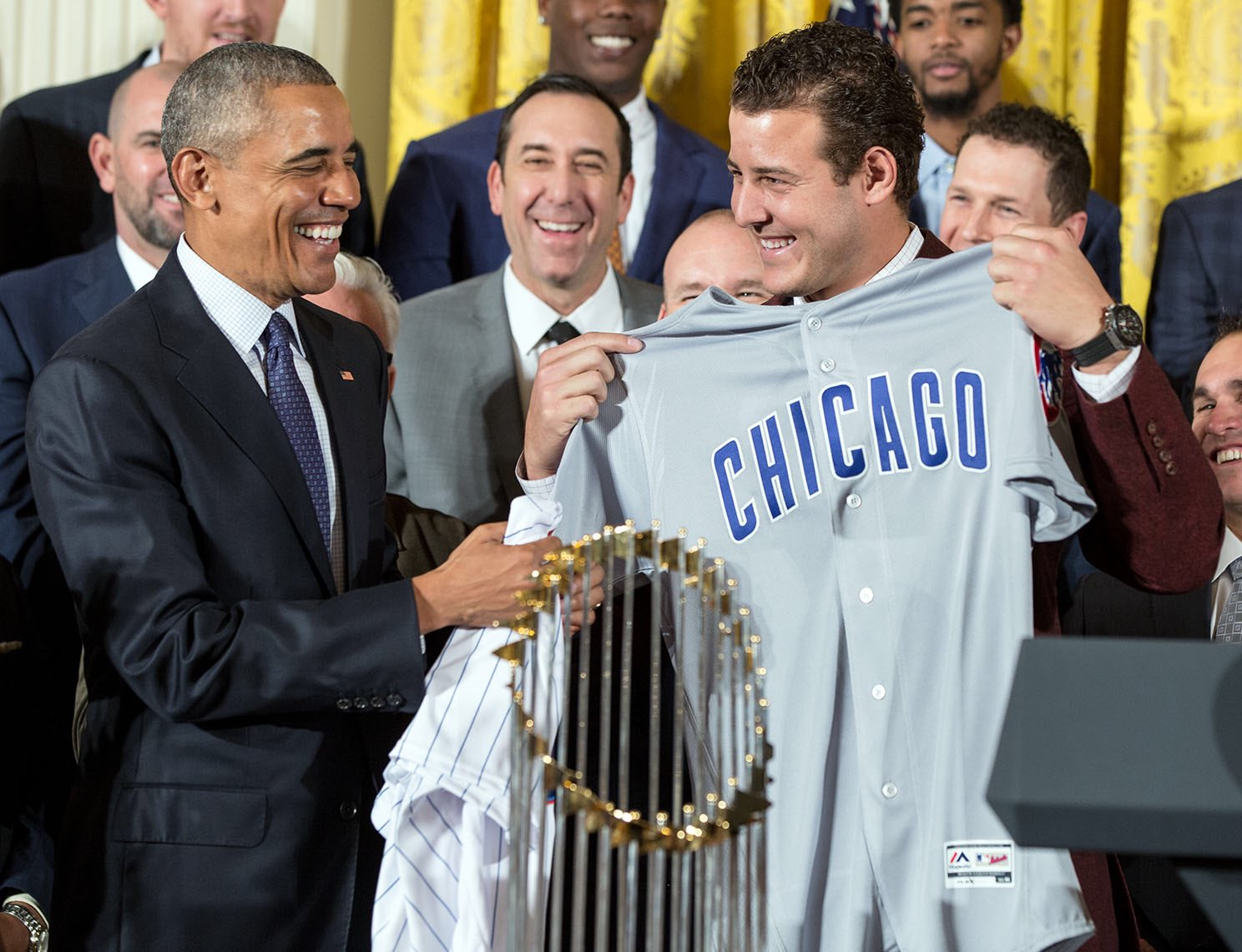
Rizzo presents President Obama a Cubs jersey at a January 16, 2017, visit to the White House.

With the Cubs in a season-long slump and playing .500 baseball, manager Joe Maddon inserted the power-hitting Rizzo into the leadoff spot in an away game against the New York Mets on June 13. In the next seven games, the Cubs went 5–2, and Rizzo hit 4 home runs (3 to lead off a game). By June 20, Rizzo had reached base in the first inning in his first seven games as a leadoff hitter and became the first player to reach safely to start the first inning in his first seven career leadoff appearances in over 50 years in the majors. He had 12 hits in 28 at-bats with 10 RBIs and hit .430 during the streak. Rizzo finished second behind the Nationals Ryan Zimmerman in a tight race for starting NL first baseman in the All-Star Game. On September 2, Rizzo became the fourth Cubs players to hit at least 30 home runs, 30 doubles, and 100 RBIs in three or more seasons; the others were Hack Wilson, Billy Williams, and Sammy Sosa.

For the season, he batted .273/.392/.507 with 32 home runs and 109 RBIs. He led the majors in hit by pitch, with 24.

Rizzo had a disappointing postseason. In 37 at-bats, he had one home run in 5 hits, 6 RBIs and an anemic batting average of .135. On October 27, Rizzo received the Roberto Clemente Award for his charity's work to find a cure for childhood cancer. Of winning the award, Rizzo said, "This is amazing. The greatest award you can win. It will go front and center in front of anything I've ever done."

==== 2018 ====
On April 10, 2018, Rizzo was placed on the disabled list for the first time in his MLB career, due to a back issue. Prior to a May 23 game against the Cleveland Indians, Rizzo ranked fourth in Cubs franchise history with 17 home runs during interleague play. On July 23, Rizzo convinced Cubs manager Joe Maddon to let him make his first career pitching appearance. It took him two pitches to retire A. J. Pollock of the Arizona Diamondbacks on a fly out to center field.

Rizzo finished 2018 batting .283 with 25 home runs and 101 RBIs in 153 games, and was third in the major leagues in hit by pitch, with 20. Tied for Gold Glove Award votes with Atlanta Braves first baseman Freddie Freeman, Rizzo received the award for the second time in his career.

==== 2019 ====
In 2019, Rizzo hit .293/.405/.520 with 27 home runs and 94 RBIs. He led the major leagues in times hit by a pitch with 27. He also received his third Gold Glove Award.

==== 2020 ====
In the shortened 2020 season, Rizzo played in 58 games and finished with a .222/.342/.414 hit line, 11 home runs, 24 RBIs, and 3 stolen bases. He also received his fourth Gold Glove Award; his third in a row. After the season, the Cubs picked up Rizzo's last year of his seven-year, $41 million contract which paid Rizzo $16.5 million for the 2021 season.

==== 2021 ====
In 92 games for the Cubs, Rizzo batted .248/.346/.446 with 14 home runs, 40 RBIs, and 4 stolen bases. In an April 28 game against the Atlanta Braves, Rizzo moved from first base to pitcher in a 10–0 Atlanta rout. He recorded two outs against three batters faced, including a strikeout of Freddie Freeman on a 61-mph, 2–2 curveball.

=== New York Yankees ===
Rizzo with the Yankees

==== 2021 ====
On July 29, 2021, Rizzo was traded to the New York Yankees along with cash considerations for Kevin Alcántara and Alexander Vizcaíno.

Rizzo's first game with the Yankees was on July 30 against the Miami Marlins. Rizzo made an immediate impact, going 4 for 5 with 2 solo home runs in each of his first two games, and 3 walks and 5 runs overall, becoming the first player in the franchise history to achieve this feat. He also became the first Yankees player of all-time to get on base eight times (including a hit-by-pitch) and the seventh Yankee to homer in his first two games.

On August 4, Rizzo hit a solo home run during a game against the Baltimore Orioles, making him the first Yankee player to drive in a run in his first 6 games with the team. He also became the fourth MLB player with RBIs in his first 6 games with a new team, joining Jim Spencer (1973), Jim Wynn (1974), and Bobby Murcer (1977). On September 30, Rizzo hit his 250th home run during a game against the Toronto Blue Jays. It was a solo shot in the sixth inning off of starting pitcher Robbie Ray. He became the first Yankees player since Derek Jeter to reach this milestone while playing for the team.

==== 2022 ====
Rizzo (right) being interviewed after his three home run game in April 2022

On March 17, 2022, the Yankees signed Rizzo to a two-year $32 million contract. Rizzo hit a home run in each of the first two games of the season making him only the second player in the modern era to homer in his first two games with a new team, and again in that team's first two games the following season. On April 26, Rizzo hit three home runs in a game against the Baltimore Orioles. In the postseason, Rizzo finished with a .276 batting average with 8 hits, 2 home runs and 8 RBI's in 29 at bats. On November 7, he exercised an opt-out clause in his contract and became a free agent.

==== 2023 ====
Rizzo signed a two-year, $40 million contract with an option for the 2025 season on November 15, 2022. In a May 28, 2023, game against the San Diego Padres, Rizzo tagged Fernando Tatís Jr. out as the result of a pickoff attempt. In the play, Tatís knocked Rizzo to the ground, causing him to leave the game with what was described as a neck injury. Prior to that game, Rizzo had batted .304/.376/.508 with 11 home runs. However, in the 46 games that followed, he hit just .172/.271/.225 with only one home run. On August 3, the Yankees placed Rizzo on the injured list with post-concussion syndrome, with the belief that the injury stemmed from the Tatís incident. On September 5, manager Aaron Boone announced that Rizzo would be shut down and would not play again in 2023. Rizzo was transferred to the 60-day injured list on September 12, officially ending his season.

==== 2024 ====
Rizzo began the 2024 season as New York's primary first baseman, hitting .223 with eight home runs and 28 RBI across 70 games. On June 18, he was placed on the injured list after suffering a broken arm in a collision with Boston Red Sox pitcher Brennan Bernardino. Rizzo was transferred to the 60-day injured list the following day. He was activated on September 1. On September 28, Rizzo fractured multiple fingers on his right hand after being hit by a pitch against the Pittsburgh Pirates. He was later ruled out for the Yankees' ALDS matchup against the Kansas City Royals. He was later added to the Yankees' roster ahead of their ALCS matchup against the Cleveland Guardians. After the Yankees lost the World Series, the Yankees declined his $17 million option for the 2025 season, paying him a $6 million buyout and making him a free agent.

=== International career ===
As his family originated in the Sicilian town of Ciminna, Rizzo chose to play for Italy in the 2013 World Baseball Classic. He batted 4-for-17 with five walks in five games.

=== Retirement ===
On September 10, 2025, Rizzo announced his retirement from professional baseball and that he would join the Cubs organization as a team ambassador.

== Personal life ==
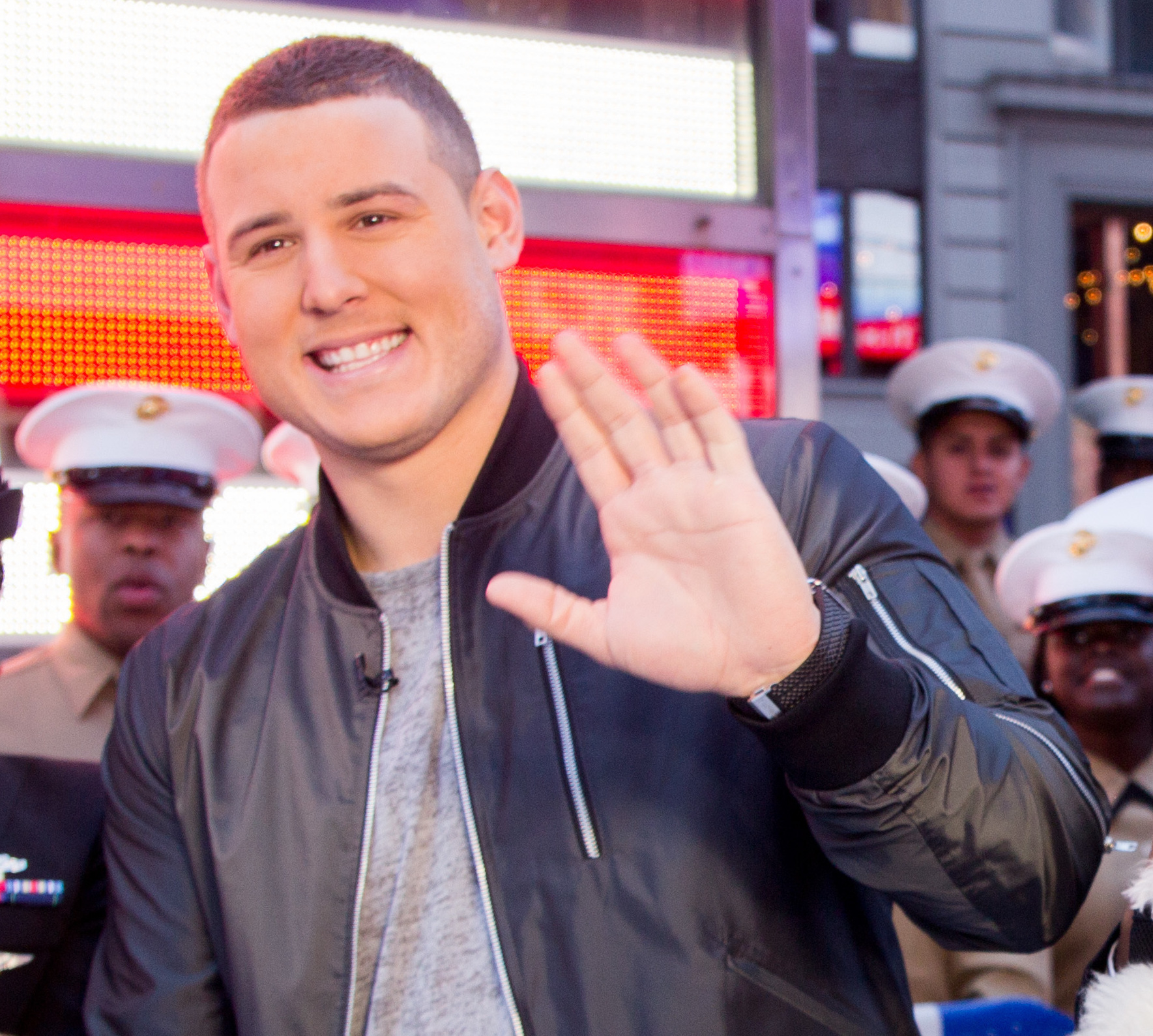
Rizzo on the set of Good Morning America in 2016

Rizzo has an older brother, John, who was a lineman for the Florida Atlantic University football team.

Rizzo was diagnosed with limited-state classical Hodgkin's lymphoma in April 2008, and underwent chemotherapy for six months. His grandmother was suffering from breast cancer at the same time. On September 2, 2008, Rizzo's doctor told him he was in remission, though he still had six weeks left of treatment and some follow-up testing. On November 18, Rizzo's doctor told him he "could live a normal life."

Rizzo proposed to girlfriend Emily Vakos on June 1, 2017. They met when the Cubs were in Arizona for spring training 2016. The couple were married on December 29, 2018, with teammate Kris Bryant serving as one of the groomsmen. They reside in Fort Lauderdale, Florida. In 2021, they moved out of a Chicago apartment where they had lived for seven years, after Rizzo was traded.

== Charity work ==
In 2012, the Anthony Rizzo Family Foundation was founded. It is a non-profit 501(c)(3) organization, benefiting cancer research and families affected by the disease. The foundation is run entirely by Rizzo's family, his close friends, and his management team. Rizzo provides oversight and leadership. In August 2017, the foundation announced a $3.5 million gift to the Lurie Children's Hospital in Chicago, bringing its total donations to the hospital to more than $4 million.

On February 15, 2018, Rizzo delivered an emotional speech at the vigil for the Stoneman Douglas school shooting victims in Parkland, Florida; Rizzo attended Marjory Stoneman Douglas High School and is a longtime Parkland resident. He met with survivors of the massacre before a game with the Marlins, and helped donate $305,000 to the National Compassion Fund for victims and their families.

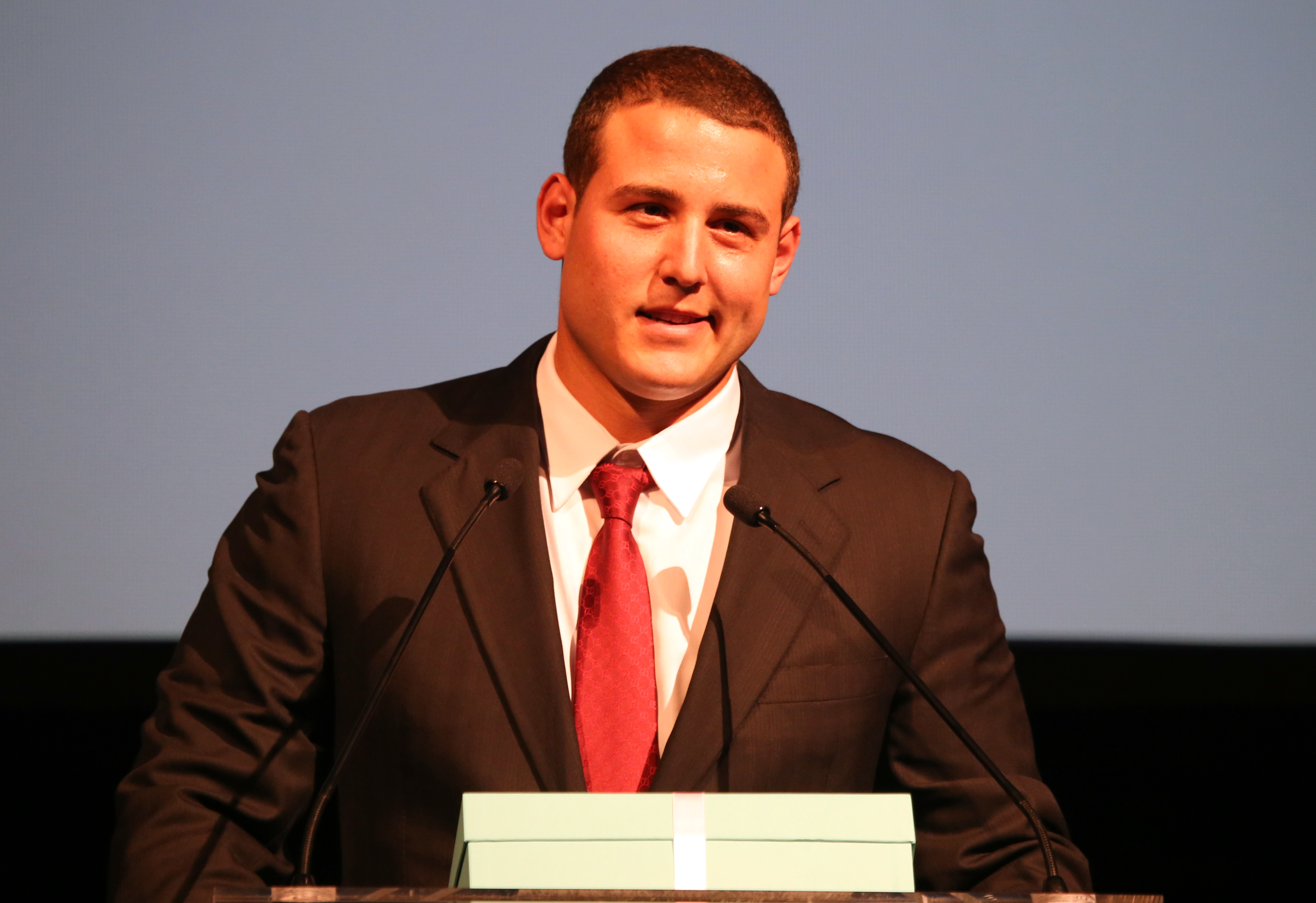
Rizzo accepts the Heart & Hustle Award at the 2015 MLBPAA Legends for Youth Dinner.

On May 15, 2015, the Anthony Rizzo Family Foundation hosted its 3rd Annual Cook-Off For Cancer and raised more than $270,000. On November 15, 2015, the foundation hosted its 4th Annual Walk-Off for Cancer and raised more than $200,000 for pediatric cancer research and providing support to children and their families. On June 2, 2016, the foundation hosted its 4th Annual Cook-Off For Cancer and raised more than $630,000.

The 5th annual Walk-Off for Cancer was held on Sunday, December 11, 2016, and raised more than $500,000 by Rizzo's foundation. Broward County Commissioner Michael Udine proclaimed Sunday to be Anthony Rizzo Day in Broward County. Rizzo's old high school officially retired his jersey, Number 7. Rizzo and his foundation hosted its 6th annual Walk-Off for Cancer on December 3, 2017 and raised $960,000 for families affected by cancer. Net proceeds from the event would benefit Joe DiMaggio Children's Hospital, the University of Miami Sylvester Comprehensive Cancer Center, and provide grants to families affected by cancer. The 7th Annual Walk-Off for Cancer hosted by the foundation raised $1.1 million on December 2, 2018. The money went to the Joe DiMaggio Children's Hospital, the University of Miami Sylvester Comprehensive Cancer Center, and families affected by cancer.

On May 27, 2019, the Anthony Rizzo Family Foundation hosted its 7th Annual Cook-Off For Cancer and raised $1.8 million for cancer patients and their families. On November 24, 2019, the Anthony Rizzo Family Foundation hosted its 8th Annual Walk-Off for Cancer and raised more than $1.35 million. On January 16, 2020, The Anthony Rizzo Family Foundation raised close to $500,000 to help families affected by cancer during its 6th Annual Laugh-Off for Cancer. In February 2020, Rizzo donated $150,000 to Marjory Stoneman Douglas High School to help pay for the school's lights for its baseball and softball fields. His high school unveiled the new baseball field which will be known as Anthony Rizzo Field. The foundation hosted its 9th Annual Walk-Off for Cancer on November 15, 2020, and raised more than $850,000.
