= Zazzo =

Zazzo is a surname. Notable people with the surname include:

- Lawrence Zazzo (born 1970), American countertenor
- René Zazzo (1910–1995), French psychologist and pedagogue

== See also ==
- Zazzau
- Zizzo
