= Rizzo =

Rizzo may refer to:

- Rizzo (band), an indie pop band from Los Angeles
- Rizzo (surname)
- Rizzo (Legends of Chima), a character in Legends of Chima
- Rizzo the Rat, a Muppet character
