= Risso =

Risso may refer to:

- Risso (surname)
- Risso, Uruguay
- Risso's dolphin, species
- Risso (cooking oil), a worldwide cooking oil originally from Spain
