= Rizo =

Rizo is a surname of Spanish origin. People with the surname include:

- Alex Rizo (born 1968), American politician and educator
- Carlos Esplá Rizo (1895–1971), Spanish politician and journalist
- Erick Rizo (born 1991), Cuban footballer
- Eustacio Rizo (born 1971), Mexican footballer
- Eyatne Rizo (born 1995), Cuban handball player
- Felipe Ramos Rizo (born 1963), Mexican football referee
- Jorge Rizo (born 1952), Cuban water polo player
- José Rizo (DJ) (born 1956), Mexican-born American disc jockey
- José Rizo Castellón (1944–2019), Nicaraguan politician
- Luis Fernando Rizo-Salom (1971–2013), Colombian composer
- Marco Rizo (1920–1998), Cuban-born pianist, composer, and arranger
- Salvador Rizo (1760–1816), Colombian botanist and painter

== See also ==
- Gustavo Rizo Airport, domestic airport serving Baracoa, Cuba
- Rizzo (surname)
- Rizos, a surname
- Ríos (disambiguation)
