= Anthony Rizzo Family Foundation =

American non-profit organization

- Formation: 2012
- Founder: Anthony Rizzo
- Type: Non-profit organization
- Headquarters: Parkland, Florida; Brooklyn, New York
- Website: arizzofoundation.org

Anthony Rizzo Family Foundation is a 501(c)(3) non-profit organization established in Parkland, Florida, in 2012 by professional baseball player Anthony Rizzo. The organization raises money for cancer research and provides support to families affected by cancer. The headquarters are in Parkland, Florida, and Brooklyn, New York.

== Background ==
In 2007, first baseman for the Chicago Cubs Anthony Rizzo, was diagnosed with Hodgkin lymphoma at the age of 18. Rizzo entered remission on September 2, 2008, After which he started The Anthony Rizzo Family Foundation. In 2012 the Anthony Rizzo Family Foundation began its work supporting research into cancer, and the families suffering from it.

The foundation focuses on individuals affected by cancer and the financial or personal needs of their family. The mission of the organization is to help raise money for cancer research and provide support for children and their families financially. The organization is run by Anthony Rizzo, his family, and a management team.

== Events ==
=== Cook-Off for Cancer ===
The Anthony Rizzo Family Foundation held its fourth annual Cook-Off for Cancer at the Morgan Manufacturing in Chicago, Illinois, on June 2, 2016. The event included fellow Chicago Cubs players such as Jake Arrieta, John Lackey, Kyle Schwarber and various other players. The players assisted in bartending, serving food and socializing with guests. The sold out event raised more than $1.1 million for children and families affected by cancer along with money for future cancer research.

=== Laugh-Off for Cancer ===
The Anthony Rizzo Family Foundation hosted its annual "Laugh-Off for Cancer event", a trademarked comedy show, was hosted at Studio Paris in Chicago on January 12, 2017. In attendance were fellow Chicago Cubs such as Kris Bryant and manager Joe Maddon. The event raised $300,000 worth of proceeds towards cancer research and families affected by cancer.

=== Walk-Off for Cancer ===
The Anthony Rizzo Family Foundation held its sixth annual "Walk-Off for Cancer 5k", at Pine Trails Park in Parkland, Florida. Participants running the event pay a standard rate of $44.00, which includes a Walk-Off for Cancer T-shirt, Cubs hat, a Nike drawstring back, as well as other various items. Entertainment, refreshments, and raffles are also included in the event. The event raised $960,000, all of which that will go to the Joe DiMaggio Children's Hospital and the University of Miami Sylvester Comprehensive Cancer Center. Proceeds are also granted to families affected by cancer.

== Sponsors and contributors ==
Various companies such as American Airlines, Lexus, Chicago Cubs, Fanatics, and Nike, have contributed to the foundation.

Chef and cookbook author, Heath Schecter, pledged to donate 25 percent of his book proceeds to the Anthony Rizzo Family Foundation

Barrington area philanthropist Rick Heidner and his family have been significant individual contributors to the Anthony Rizzo Family Foundation. Since at least 2021, the Heidners have hosted annual poolside fundraising events in support of the foundation, with proceeds from the 5th annual gathering in July 2021 surpassing $604,000 to benefit families affected by pediatric cancer. Rick Heidner expressed gratitude for community generosity and emphasized the event’s impact on supporting the foundation’s mission.

== Proceeds ==
In 2014, Anthony Rizzo and the Anthony Rizzo Family Foundation was presented with the Branch Rickey Award in Denver, Colorado, and was one of the youngest to receive this award for his contributions to cancer research thru the formation of the Anthony Rizzo Family Foundation.

In 2015, the foundation donated $250,000 to the cancer center in support of research in lymphoma. After the foundation's donation, the research clinic honored the Anthony Rizzo Family Foundation by naming one Hematology Oncology waiting room after the foundation.

Majority of the money raised from the foundation supports the Sylvester Comprehensive Cancer Center at the University of Miami, Florida, Ann & Robert H. Lurie Children's Hospital of Chicago, Illinois, Joe DiMaggio's Children's Hospital, Florida, and The Family Reach Foundation, Illinois.

In 2017, the Anthony Rizzo Family Foundation made $3.5 million in donations to the Ann & Robert H. Lurie Children's Hospital of Chicago. The foundation's contributions provide families grants towards their medical expenses on a case-by-case basis. The foundation has also made contributions to two oncology specialists.

After donating over 3 million dollars to help cancer effected families with financial difficulties in 2017, Lurie Children's Hospital honored Anthony Rizzo and the foundation during a ribbon cutting ceremony for a waiting room named after Rizzo.

In 2017, the Sylvester Comprehensive Cancer Center at the University of Miami Health system received a $650,000 donation from the foundation. The Cancer center, also funds research for the disease specifically for children and adolescents affected by cancer. The Anthony Rizzo Family Foundation Hope 44 program funded US$500,000 of the $650,000 donation. The rest of the proceeds went to director of the Lymphoma Program and research in the field.

In 2017, Anthony Rizzo, a graduate of Marjory Stoneman Douglas High School donated $150,000 on behalf of the Anthony Rizzo Family Foundation to cover half the cost of the installation of a new lighting system at the school's 'Anthony Rizzo' field. The event was named, "A Night Under the Lights With Anthony Rizzo".

The Anthony Rizzo Family Foundation helped raise money for families of victims of the Parkland school shooting in February 2018. The foundation contributed to the community by donating autographed items from teammates and other MLB players along with raising awareness on social media.
