= Mauro Rizzo =

Italian footballer (born 1984)

Personal information
- Full name: Mauro Rizzo
- Date of birth: 15 June 1984 (age 42)
- Place of birth: Galatina, Italy
- Height: 1.80 m (5 ft 11 in)
- Position: Defender

Youth career
- ?–2002: Lecce
- 2002–2004: Roma
- 2003–2004: → Lecce (loan)

Senior career*
Years	Team	Apps	(Gls)
2002	Lecce	1	(0)
2004–2006	Lecce	1	(0)
2004–2005	→ Bellaria (loan)	0	(0)
2006	→ Andria (loan)	12	(0)
2006–2008	Andria	42	(0)
2008–2009	Melfi	23	(0)
Total		78	(0)
- * Club domestic league appearances and goals

Mauro Rizzo (born 15 June 1984) is a footballer from Italy. He has played as a defender for the U.S. Lecce, Roma, Bellaria, Andria, and Melfi football club.

== Career ==
Born in Galatina, the Province of Lecce, Rizzo started his career at U.S. Lecce in 2001. There, his first and only match played was the last match of the 2001-2002 season, with a 0–3 loss to A.C. Milan after replacing Alberto Savino in the 88th minute. In the summer of 2002, he was exchanged with Cesare Bovo of A.S. Roma in a co-ownership (i.e. 50%) deal, and both were tagged for €3M for 50% of the players' rights. He played a season with Roma's Primavera team. In July 2003, he was loaned back to Lecce and bought back in June 2004 for €40,000. Co-currently, Bovo, who was already a regular member of the Italy U21 team, returned to Roma for just €10,000.

Rizzo was sent to Bellaria on loan during the 2004–05 season, but returned to Lecce in January 2005. In January 2006, he left for Serie C2 side Andria BAT. In summer 2006, Andria formed a co-ownership deal with Lecce and played 26 league matches. In June 2007, Roma gave up their remaining rights of Rizzo to Andria. He played 1 more season for Andria at Serie C2 then joined Lega Pro Seconda Divisione (ex-Serie C2) Melfi after Andria were relegated (Andria were later re-admitted to the league).

He left Melfi in the summer of 2009 to join Atletico Tricase and played there for a season. He left Tricase the following year to join AS Bisceglie 1913. His last known club was Atletico Racale. He is currently without a club.
