= People v. Rizzo =

1927 New York state criminal case

- Court: New York Court of Appeals
- Full case name: The People of the State of New York, Respondent, v. Charles Rizzo, Appellant, Impleaded with Others.
- Decided: November 22, 1927
- Citation: 246 N.Y. 334; 158 N.E. 888

Case history
- Appealed from: Bronx County Court; Appellate Division of the New York Supreme Court

Court membership
- Judges sitting: Frederick E. Crane, Henry T. Kellogg, John F. O'Brien

Case opinions
- Majority: Crane, joined by Kellogg, O'Brien

People v. Rizzo, Court of Appeals of New York, 246 N.Y. 334, 158 N.E. 888 (1927), is a criminal case that set precedent for what constitutes an attempt to commit a crime.

== Background ==
Charles Rizzo, Anthony J. Dorio, Thomas Milo and John Thomasello, all between the ages of 20-23, planned to rob a courier carrying payroll for the United Lathing Company, where Rizzo's father worked. Rizzo told the others that he could identify the courier. They drove around looking for the courier, but they failed to locate the courier before police stopped and arrested them.

Charles Rizzo and his partners were convicted of attempted robbery in the first degree by the Bronx County Court on February 17, 1927. They were given sentences ranging from 7.5 to 25 years at Sing Sing. Rizzo appealed to the New York Supreme Court, Appellate Division which affirmed the conviction on June 27, 1927. He then appealed to New York's highest court, the Court of Appeals.

== Opinion ==
The Court of Appeals unanimously found that actions must be "dangerously near" to the commission of a crime to satisfy the action for an attempt. Having failed to find his target, Rizzo could not have been dangerously near commission of robbery to be found guilty of attempting robbery. Analogizing, the Court explained that someone who planned to break into a building but could not find it would not be guilty of attempted burglary, and someone who wanted to kill someone wouldn't be guilty of attempted murder if they could not find them.

The Court overturned Rizzo's conviction and ordered he receive a new trial. However, as Rizzo was the only defendant who had appealed, the Court could not overturn the sentences of his co-defendants despite ruling that they were innocent of that crime. The Court suggested that Bronx District Attorney ask the governor for a pardon or commutation to address the issue.

== Aftermath ==
A month after the Court of Appeals ruling, The New York Times reported that Bronx District Attorney McGeehan said, "I do not feel that it would be fair to embarrass the Governor with a request for a pardon for these men," and that he would instead ask the local court to act on their habeas corpus petitions. The three men, Dorio, Milo, and Thomasello, were pardoned by Governor Al Smith on January 30, 1928.
