= Rizos =

Rizos (Greek: Ρίζος) is a Greek surname. People with the surname include:

- Giannis Rizos (born 2002), Greek footballer
- Iakovos Rizos (1849–1926), Greek painter
- Ioannis Rizos (born 2000), Greek pole vaulter
- Nikos Rizos (1924–1999), Greek actor

== See also ==
- Rizo, Spanish surname
