= John-Ross Rizzo =

American physician and academic

John-Ross(JR) Rizzo
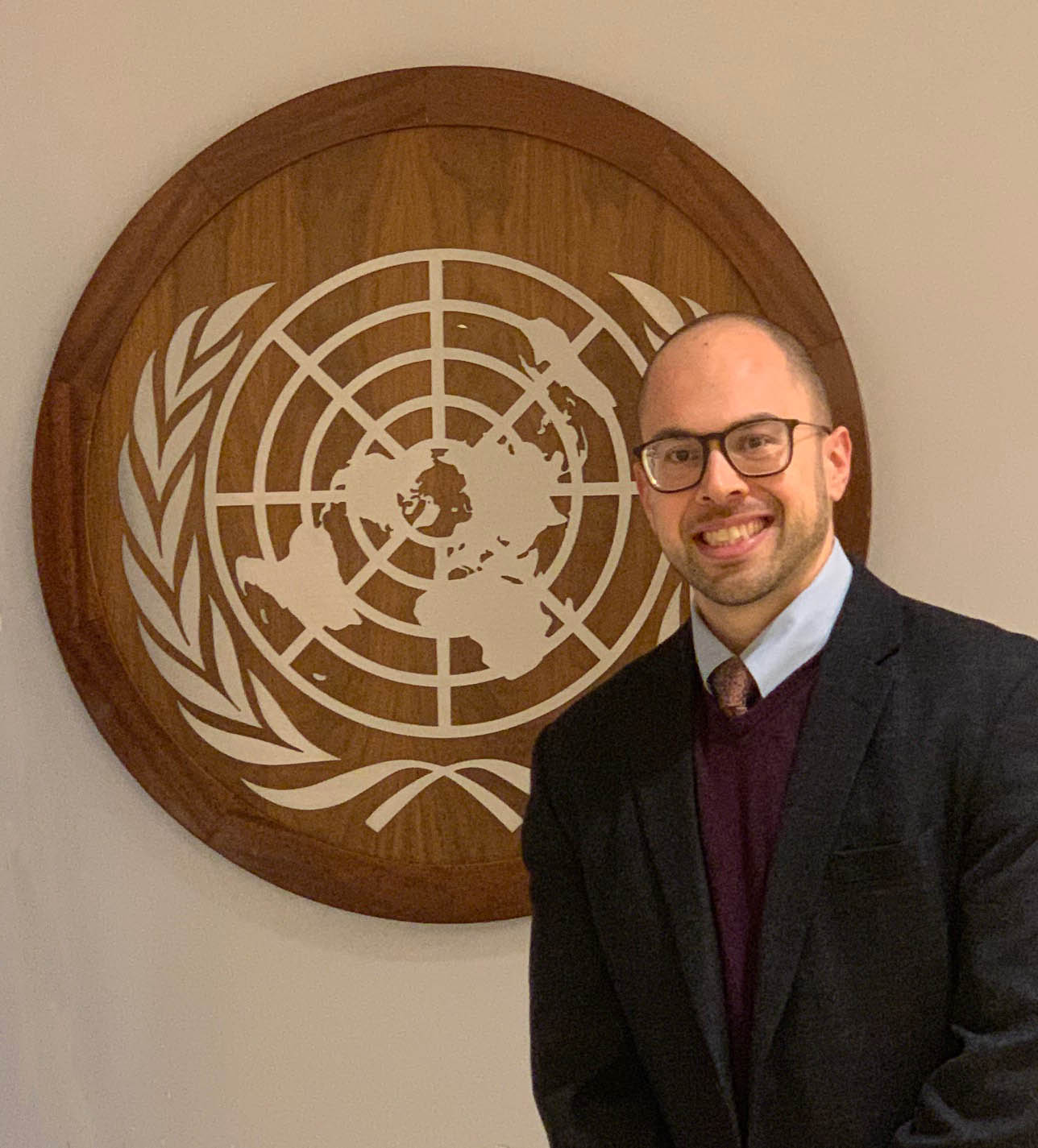
- Rizzo pictured at United Nation
- Education: New York University
- Employer: NYU Langone Health
- Known for: Assistive technology, Eye–hand coordination, Rehabilitation Medicine, Neurology, Ophthalmology, Biomedical Engineering, Disability Studies, Human–Computer Interaction
- Website: JohnRoss Rizzo-NYU School of Medicine, RizzoLab

John-Ross (JR) Rizzo, MD, MSc, FACRM is an American physician-scientist, academic leader, rehabilitation and disability authority, and inclusion advocate whose work spans rehabilitation medicine, neuroscience, biomedical engineering, assistive technology, healthcare accessibility, and disability health equity. He serves as Deputy Director of the Institute for Excellence in Health Equity (IEHE) at NYU Langone Health, an inaugural leadership role that integrates accessibility, disability inclusion, and rehabilitation into the institution's health equity strategy across clinical care, research, education, and quality improvement.

Rizzo also serves as Vice Chair for Innovation and Access in the Department of Rehabilitation Medicine and the Ilse Melamid Associate Professor of Rehabilitation Medicine at NYU Langone Health. He holds additional faculty appointments in Neurology and Ophthalmology at the NYU Grossman School of Medicine and in Mechanical and Aerospace Engineering and Biomedical Engineering at the NYU Tandon School of Engineering.

His research integrates neuroscience, rehabilitation, engineering, and artificial intelligence to develop technologies and care models that advance accessibility, modernize healthcare delivery, and improve outcomes for all patients.

== Early life and education ==
Rizzo was raised in northern New Jersey and was diagnosed during childhood with choroideremia, a congenital, X-linked retinal disease associated with progressive vision loss.

He completed his undergraduate education at New York University, where he wrote an honors thesis in neural science and completed double minors in chemistry and psychology. He was a Dean's Scholar and received the university's Founders Day Award.

Rizzo earned his medical degree from New York Medical College, where he attended on an academic scholarship, was elected to the Alpha Omega Alpha Honor Medical Society, and conducted research in neuro-ophthalmology under Sansar Sharma. He subsequently completed his residency in Physical Medicine and Rehabilitation at NYU Langone Health's Rusk Rehabilitation, serving as chief resident and holding additional leadership positions.

He completed advanced clinical research training through the Physician Scientist Training Program at the NYU School of Medicine's Clinical and Translational Science Institute, supported by the National Institutes of Health's National Center for Advancing Translational Sciences. His training integrated Rusk Institute of Rehabilitation Medicine, the NYU Center for Neural Science, and the Department of Psychology under the mentorship of Michael S. Landy. He earned a Master of Science in Clinical Investigation from New York University.

== Career ==
=== Academic and Clinical Leadership ===
Rizzo joined the faculty of NYU Langone Medical Center in 2013. He serves as the Ilse Melamid Associate Professor of Rehabilitation Medicine and holds additional faculty appointments in Neurology and Ophthalmology at the NYU Grossman School of Medicine and in Mechanical and Aerospace Engineering and Biomedical Engineering at the NYU Tandon School of Engineering.

In 2026, Rizzo was appointed Deputy Director of the Institute for Excellence in Health Equity (IEHE), an inaugural leadership position that expanded his work in healthcare accessibility, disability inclusion, and rehabilitation into NYU Langone's broader health equity agenda. Working with the Institute's executive leadership, he helps direct enterprise-wide strategy across clinical care, research, education, quality improvement, community engagement, and policy, with a particular focus on embedding accessibility and universal design as foundational components of equitable healthcare delivery.

The appointment built upon his earlier role as NYU Langone Health's first Health System Director for Enterprise Accessibility, reflecting the integration of accessibility and disability inclusion into the institution's broader health equity strategy. In addition, he serves as Vice Chair for Innovation and Access in the Department of Rehabilitation Medicine, where he leads initiatives spanning rehabilitation innovation, accessibility, disability inclusion, digital health, and health system transformation.

Rizzo directs the Visuomotor Integration Laboratory, where his multidisciplinary research program spans rehabilitation neuroscience, visual neuroscience, computational motor control, biomedical engineering, artificial intelligence, assistive technology, and disability health equity. His work investigates the neural mechanisms underlying visuomotor function and recovery after neurological injury while developing technologies that improve mobility, independence, and healthcare accessibility for people with disabilities.

His research has been supported by the National Institutes of Health (NIH), National Science Foundation (NSF), U.S. Department of Defense (DoD), Patient-Centered Outcomes Research Institute (PCORI), U.S. Department of Transportation (USDOT), and philanthropic and industry partners. He has served as principal investigator, co-principal investigator, or key personnel on competitively funded research portfolios totaling approximately US$60 million.

Rizzo has authored nearly 200 peer-reviewed publications and delivered more than 400 invited lectures and scientific presentations nationally and internationally. His scholarship bridges foundational neuroscience with translational rehabilitation, biomedical engineering, artificial intelligence, and disability health equity, contributing to innovations in assistive technology, accessible healthcare, and mobility for people with disabilities.

=== Public Service, Policy Impact, and Board Leadership ===
Beyond his academic and clinical appointments, Rizzo has held leadership roles in disability advocacy, transportation accessibility, professional certification, and public service. In 2023, New York Governor Kathy Hochul appointed him to the Board of Directors of the Metropolitan Transportation Authority (MTA), the nation's largest public transportation authority. As an MTA Board member, he serves as Chair of the Diversity Committee and is a member of the New York City Transit, Capital Program, and Audit Committees, helping guide policy related to accessibility, equity, governance, and system modernization.

Rizzo also serves on the Board of Directors of VISIONS/Services for the Blind and Visually Impaired, the Board of Directors of the Choroideremia Research Foundation, and the Board of Directors of the Academy for Certification of Vision Rehabilitation and Education Professionals (ACVREP). In October 2026, he joined the Board of Trustees of the American Foundation for the Blind (AFB).Through these roles, he contributes to advancing rehabilitation, accessibility, patient advocacy, and professional standards in vision rehabilitation.

He has additionally served in advisory capacities for numerous organizations dedicated to blindness, rehabilitation, and disability inclusion, including the Lighthouse Guild, the Foundation Fighting Blindness, and other national organizations working to advance accessible healthcare, assistive technology, and community participation for people with disabilities.

Within NYU Langone Health, Rizzo serves as an institutional ombudsperson, advising faculty, staff, and trainees on complex workplace and organizational matters while promoting accessibility, innovation, and inclusive institutional practices.

== Research Program ==
Rizzo’s research portfolio integrates multimodal methodologies from neuroscience, biomechanics,human–computer interaction, and data science, with a focus on how humans sense, perceive, and act in constrained or degraded sensory environments and how technology can augment or restore functional independence.His research has been supported by the NIH, NSF, Department of Defense, PCORI, Department of Transportation, and major foundation, corporate, and municipal partners. His portfolio includes nearly 50 grants (awarded or pending), representing more than US$70 million in cumulative project costs. Rizzo has authored approximately 200 publications, delivered more than 300 invited presentations, and mentors 25–30 trainees annually across engineering, neuroscience, medicine, and rehabilitation fields. He is the founding director of two laboratories:

Visuomotor Integration Laboratory (VMIL) – Focused on fundamental research in sensorimotor neuroscience and the neural and behavioral underpinnings of visuomotor coordination, with applications to stroke and other acquired neurological conditions.

Rehabilitation Engineering Alliance & Center Transforming Impaired Vision (REACTIV) – A translational engineering hub advancing assistive technology for blind and low-vision users, including wearable navigation supports, haptic mobility aids, and multimodal perception systems that integrate computer vision, spatial mapping, and machine learning.

His research program encompasses several interrelated domains:

Visuomotor neuroscience and visuomotor integration– Examining the neural architecture of eye–hand coordination, perceptual–motor coupling, and adaptive control in both healthy populations and individuals with neurological injury, contributing to broader questions in sensorimotor neuroscience and the dynamics of human movement.

Blind biomechanics and nonvisual mobility – Characterizing gait, balance, obstacle negotiation, and spatial orientation strategies in individuals with blindness or low vision, expanding biomechanics to include nonvisual locomotion models and informing novel mobility-support technologies.

Assistive technology usability and human–technology interaction – Investigating the design, adoption, learning curves, and real-world integration of rehabilitation and orientation-and-mobility technologies, with an emphasis on user-centered and disability-centered design, usability, accessibility, and cognitive load.

Wearable and AI-enabled rehabilitation technologies – Developing haptic interfaces, spatial-intelligence systems, eye-tracking biomarkers, and machine-learning models for predicting movement efficiency, wayfinding performance, and neurological impairment. Disability health services research and universal design – Studying structural inequities in healthcare access, digital accessibility, and environmental design, and advancing system-level models that embed accessibility as a foundational element of population health, quality, and safety.

== Awards ==
Rizzo has received awards and professional recognition for contributions to rehabilitation medicine, assistive technology, disability inclusion, accessibility, and mentorship. Notable examples include:

2014: Crain's New York Business named Rizzo to its 40 Under 40 list for his work developing assistive technologies for people with visual impairments. During the same year, he received the Foundation for Physical Medicine and Rehabilitation's Richard Materson Education Research Fund Research Award, the Oxford Center for Entrepreneurs' Rising Star Entrepreneur first prize, the National Collegiate Inventors and Innovators Alliance E-Team Award, the New York City Economic Development Corporation's Health 2.0 Pilot Health Tech NYC Host Award, and the Association of Academic Physiatrists' Rehabilitation Medicine Scientist Training Program Grant Award. The Oxford Center for Entrepreneurs separately identified Rizzo and Tactile Navigation Tools as its 2014 Rising Star Entrepreneur award recipient.

2015: Rizzo received the Association of Academic Physiatrists' Electrode Store Best Paper Award in the faculty category. He also received a Rising Star Award from the Queens Courier, a Certificate of Special Congressional Recognition for leadership, and a New York City Council citation for exemplary community service.

2016: The Association of Academic Physiatrists selected one of Rizzo's research abstracts among its “Top 10 Newsworthy” abstracts. He was also selected by Forbes and KPMG as part of their “Great Re-Writer of Healthcare” initiative focused on medical devices and healthcare innovation.

2017: The American Congress of Rehabilitation Medicine (ACRM) presented Rizzo with its Young Investigator Award in Post-Acute Stroke Rehabilitation for his research on eye–hand incoordination following stroke.

2018: Rizzo received ACRM's Deborah L. Wilkerson Early Career Award in recognition of his contributions to rehabilitation research during his early career. That year, he also delivered a TEDxNYU talk titled “Assistive Technology & Advanced Wearables” on assistive technologies for people with visual impairments.

2020: Rizzo was inducted into the Susan M. Daniels Disability Mentoring Hall of Fame for his contributions to disability-inclusive mentorship.

2022: Rizzo was elected a Fellow of the American Congress of Rehabilitation Medicine (FACRM), recognizing contributions to medical rehabilitation and to ACRM.

2023: NYU Langone Health presented Rizzo with the Howard A. Rusk Leadership and Innovation Award for his work developing assistive technologies for people with disabilities and his contributions to physical medicine and rehabilitation.

2024: Rizzo received a DOTTY Award recognizing his work on accessible transportation and assistive technology. Lighthouse Guild also presented him with the Pisart Award in Technological Innovation for his work using technology to reduce barriers for people with visual impairments. Lighthouse Guild described Rizzo as the 2024 Pisart Award recipient for his work applying technology to eliminate barriers for people with vision impairments.

2025: The American Academy of Physical Medicine and Rehabilitation (AAPM&R) named Rizzo among its Innovators & Influencers honorees for innovative and influential contributions to the specialty and its patient population.

2026: During the centennial year of VISIONS/Services for the Blind and Visually Impaired, Rizzo was honored at the organization's 40th Annual Charity Golf and Tennis Outing while serving on its Board of Directors.

== Selected bibliography ==
- Rizzo, John-Ross, et al. "Post-stroke Oculomotor Abnormalities evident during Objective Eye Tracking but Not under Clinical Assessment." STROKE. Vol. 46. TWO COMMERCE SQ, 2001 MARKET ST, PHILADELPHIA, PA 19103 USA: LIPPINCOTT WILLIAMS & WILKINS, 2015.
- Rizzo, John-Ross, et al. "Objectifying eye movements during rapid number naming: methodology for assessment of normative data for the King–Devick test." Journal of the neurological sciences 362 (2016): 232–239.
- Rizzo, John-Ross, et al. "Sensor fusion for ecologically valid obstacle identification: Building a comprehensive assistive technology platform for the visually impaired." 2017 7th International Conference on Modeling, Simulation, and Applied Optimization (ICMSAO). IEEE, 2017.
- Rizzo, John-Ross, et al. "The intersection between ocular and manual motor control: eye–hand coordination in acquired brain injury." Frontiers in neurology 8 (2017): 227.
- Rizzo, John-Ross, et al. "Disrupted saccade control in chronic cerebral injury: upper motor neuron-like disinhibition in the ocular motor system." Frontiers in neurology 8 (2017): 12.
- Rizzo, John-Ross, et al. "eye control Deficits coupled to hand control Deficits: eye–hand incoordination in chronic cerebral injury." Frontiers in neurology 8 (2017): 330.
- Rizzo, John-Ross, et al. "A new primary mobility tool for the visually impaired: A white cane—adaptive mobility device hybrid." Assistive technology 30.5 (2018): 219–225.
- Rizzo, John-Ross, et al. "The effect of linguistic background on rapid number naming: implications for native versus non-native English speakers on sideline-focused concussion assessments." Brain injury 32.13-14 (2018): 1690–1699.
- Rizzo, John-Ross, et al. "Eye-hand re-coordination: A pilot investigation of gaze and reach biofeedback in chronic stroke." Progress in brain research. Vol. 249. Elsevier, 2019. 361–374.
- Rizzo, John-Ross, Sabrina Paganoni, and Thiru M. Annaswamy. "The “Nuts and Bolts” of Evidence-Based Physiatry: Core Competencies for Trainees and Clinicians." American journal of physical medicine & rehabilitation 98.10 (2019): 942-943.
- Rizzo, John-Ross, et al. "Efficiently Recording the Eye-Hand Coordination to Incoordination Spectrum." Journal of Visualized Experiments 145 (2019): e58885.
