= Major League Baseball Players Alumni Association =

U.S. non-profit organization

- Type: Non-profit
- Industry: Major League Baseball
- Founded: 1982 (44 years ago)
- Founder: Chuck Hinton
- Key people: Jim Thome (president)
- Website: www.mlb.com/mlbpaa

The Major League Baseball Players Alumni Association (MLBPAA) is a 501(c)(3) non-profit organization created in 1982 by former Washington Senators player Chuck Hinton to promote the game of baseball, raise money for charities, inspire and educate youth through positive sport images, and protect the dignity of the game through former players. It has also become a central point for former MLB players to keep in contact with each other and connect with current players. Its current president is Jim Thome.

== About the Organization ==
The MLBPAA is headquartered in Colorado Springs, Colorado, and currently has more than 7,500 members: current and former major league players, umpires, managers, coaches, and front-office personnel, and fans. Through its charitable efforts, the MLBPAA has raised $42 million for both local and national charities including, but not limited to Children's Hospitals, American Diabetes Association, Boys and Girls Clubs, Cystic Fibrosis Foundation, Special Olympics, Leukemia Society of America, the Salvation Army, Meals on Wheels and Little League Baseball.

== Legends for Youth Clinics ==
The Legends for Youth Clinic Series teaches young ballplayers (ages 6 to 16) the fundamentals of the game in a multi-station format, and stresses the importance of education to help kids recognize they have the ability to make positive decisions. Since the program's inception, the Legends for Youth clinics have reached more than 150,000 children across the United States, Europe, Dominican Republic, Venezuela, Puerto Rico, Nicaragua, and the US Virgin Islands.

== Swing with the Legends Golf Series ==
Created in 1984, these charity golf events have featured many well-known baseball players. These golf events have raised more than $80 million for charities.

== Legends for Youth Dinner ==
The Legends for Youth Dinner is the primary fundraiser for the MLBPAA's Legend for Youth Clinic Series. Established in 1999, the dinner recognizes former players' on- and off-field accomplishments along with their contributions to their communities. Other awards given out at the dinner for current Major League players include the National and American League Pitcher and Player of the Year Awards, the Dick Schaap Memorial Player of the Year Award, and the Heart and Hustle Award.

=== Heart & Hustle Award ===
The Heart & Hustle Award was created by the MLBPAA in 2005 and is presented annually to the current player who demonstrates a "passion for the game of baseball and best embodies the values, spirit and traditions of the game." The winner is voted on by both alumni and active players and is awarded at the annual Legends for Youth Dinner in New York City.

== Subsidiaries ==
To help former players, the MLBPAA wholly owns two for-profit organizations, MLAM (Major League Alumni Marketing) and MLAS (Major League Alumni Services).

=== Major League Alumni Marketing ===
MLAM was created to gain compensation for former players through endorsements and appearances, while protecting the names and likenesses of the individuals. Players are able to sign a Player Pool Agreement, which is a pool of group licensing and other marketing monies that are annually divided equally among the members. MLAM is separated into two divisions:

Legends Memorabilia Collection (LMC) is one of seven licensed dealers of authentic Major League Baseball memorabilia. LMC was started to fulfill a niche and offer memorabilia signed by any living player who has ever played the game. Throughout the year, LMC hosts numerous private signings with Hall of Famers and many miscellaneous players who have experienced the big leagues. In 2011, LMC sponsored over 100 live auctions at Major League Ball Parks.

Legends Entertainment Group (LEG) actively promotes players through endorsement deals and personal appearances. Since 1999, over $5 million has been paid to the alumni player (80% of these being non-Hall of Fame players).

=== Major League Alumni Services ===
MLAS strives to broaden membership programs including medical and pension benefits, while providing services outside the non-profit framework for the direct benefit of MLBPAA members such as free heart and lung care for former players, courtesy of Deborah Hospital.

== See also ==
- Major League Baseball Players Association
