= 2017–18 US Città di Palermo season =

Palermo
2017–18 season
- President: Giovanni Giammarva (from 8 November 2017)
- Manager: Bruno Tedino (until 28 April 2018); Roberto Stellone (from 28 April 2018)
- Stadium: Renzo Barbera
- Serie B: 4th
- Play-offs: Runners-up
- Coppa Italia: Third round
- Top goalscorer: League: Ilija Nestorovski (13); All: Ilija Nestorovski (13)
- Highest home attendance: 29,050 vs Frosinone (13 June 2018, Play-offs final)
- Lowest home attendance: 4,842 vs Venezia (2 December 2017, Serie B)
- Average home league attendance: 9,029

The 2017–18 season was Unione Sportiva Città di Palermo's 1st season in Serie B, the second-highest division of Italian football, after relegation from Serie A by the end of the 2016-17 season.

== Players ==
=== Squad information ===
Players and squad numbers last updated on 31 January 2018.
Appearances and goals are counted for domestic leagues (Serie A and Serie B) and national cup (Coppa Italia) and correct as of 16 June 2018.
Note: Flags indicate national team as has been defined under FIFA eligibility rules. Players may hold more than one non-FIFA nationality.

No.	Name	Nat	Position(s)	Date of birth (age)	Signed in	Contract ends	Signed from	Transfer Fee	Apps.	Goals
Goalkeepers
1	Fabrizio Alastra	(Italy)	GK	1 October 1997 (age 28)	2015	2019	(Italy) Youth Sector	N/A	2	-8
12	Josip Posavec	(Croatia)	GK	10 March 1996 (age 30)	2016	2020	(Croatia) Inter Zaprešić	€500,000	52	-83
Defenders
2	Giuseppe Bellusci	(Italy)	CB / RB	21 August 1989 (age 37)	2017	2020	(England) Leeds United	Free	27	0
3	Andrea Rispoli	(Italy)	RB / RWB	29 September 1988 (age 37)	2015	2019	(Italy) Parma	Free	115	12
4	Andrea Accardi	(Italy)	CB	30 July 1995 (age 31)	2015	2021	(Italy) Youth Sector	N/A	8	0
5	Slobodan Rajković	(Serbia)	CB	3 February 1989 (age 37)	2016	2020	(Germany) Darmstadt	€1.5M	21	1
6	Aljaž Struna	(Slovenia)	CB / RB	4 August 1990 (age 36)	2012	2019	(Slovenia) Koper	€300,000	62	1
14	Gabriele Rolando (Note: On loan.)	(Italy)	RB / RWB	2 April 1995 (age 31)	2017	2018	(Italy) Sampdoria	Free	14	1
15	Thiago Cionek	(Poland)	CB / RB	21 April 1986 (age 40)	2016	2018	(Italy) Modena	€350,000	53	1
17	Michel Morganella	(Switzerland)	RB / RWB	17 May 1989 (age 37)	2009	2018	(Switzerland) Basel	€2M	108	2
19	Haitam Aleesami	(Norway)	LB / LWB	31 July 1991 (age 35)	2016	2019	(Sweden) Göteborg	€1.2M	69	2
24	Przemysław Szymiński	(Poland)	CB / RB	24 June 1994 (age 32)	2017	2020	(Poland) Wisła Płock	€250,000	28	0
28	Paweł Dawidowicz	(Poland)	CB	20 May 1995 (age 31)	2017	2018	(Portugal) Benfica	Free	29	0
29/31 (Note: He wore number 29 against Virtus Francavilla and Cagliari and chose number 31 during the season.)	Roberto Pirrello	(Italy)	CB	30 May 1996 (age 30)	2016	2022	(Italy) Youth Sector	N/A	-	-
32	Andrea Ingegneri	(Italy)	CB / LB	18 January 1992 (age 34)	2017	2021	(Italy) Pordenone	Undisclosed	-	-
Midfielders
8	Mato Jajalo	(Bosnia and Herzegovina)	CM / DM	25 May 1988 (age 38)	2015	2019	(Croatia) Rijeka	Free	112	3
13	Eddy Gnahoré	(France)	CM	14 November 1993 (age 32)	2017	2021	(Italy) Napoli	€1.5M	36	4
18	Ivaylo Chochev	(Bulgaria)	CM	18 February 1993 (age 33)	2014	2020	(Bulgaria) CSKA Sofia	€2M	108	11
21	Luca Fiordilino	(Italy)	DM / CM	25 July 1996 (age 30)	2015	2021	(Italy) Youth Sector	N/A	14	0
26	Gennaro Ruggiero	(Italy)	CM	4 February 2000 (age 26)	2017		(Italy) Youth Sector	N/A	2	0
33	Davide Petermann	(Italy)	CM	25 December 1994 (age 31)	2014	2018	(Italy) Youth Sector	N/A	1	0
35	Radosław Murawski	(Poland)	CM / DM	22 April 1994 (age 32)	2017	2020	(Poland) Piast Gliwice	€650,000	41	2
Forwards
7	Aleksandar Trajkovski	(North Macedonia)	SS / AM / CF	5 September 1992 (age 34)	2015	2020	(Belgium) Zulte Waregem	€900,000	77	12
9	Stefan Silva	(Sweden)	CF	11 March 1990 (age 36)	2017	2021	(Sweden) Sundsvall	€800,000	1	0
10	Igor Coronado	(Brazil)	SS / AM	18 August 1992 (age 34)	2017	2021	(Italy) Trapani	€1.4M	43	9
11	Carlos Embaló	(Guinea-Bissau)	LW	25 November 1994 (age 31)	2013	2020	(Portugal) Chaves	€195,000	28	1
16	Norbert Balogh	(Hungary)	CF	21 February 1996 (age 30)	2016	2020	(Hungary) Debreceni	€2.2M	24	0
20	Antonino La Gumina	(Italy)	CF	6 March 1996 (age 30)	2015	2019	(Italy) Youth Sector	N/A	39	12
23	Alessandro Diamanti	(Italy)	SS / RW / AM	2 May 1983 (age 43)	2016	2018	(China) Guangzhou Evergrande	Free	32	1
27	Accursio Bentivegna	(Italy)	LW	21 June 1996 (age 30)	2014	2019	(Italy) Youth Sector	N/A	8	0
30	Ilija Nestorovski (C)	(North Macedonia)	CF / SS	12 March 1990 (age 36)	2016	2021	(Croatia) Inter Zaprešić	€500,000	72	24
34	Simone Lo Faso	(Italy)	SS	18 February 1998 (age 28)	2016	2021	(Italy) Youth Sector	N/A	12	0
36	Cephas Malele	(Switzerland)	CF	8 January 1994 (age 32)	2013	2019	(Italy) Youth Sector	N/A	6	0
Players transferred in during the season
22	Alberto Pomini	(Italy)	GK	17 March 1981 (age 45)	2017	2019	(Italy) Sassuolo	Undisclosed	27	-24
1	Luca Maniero	(Italy)	GK	12 June 1995 (age 31)	2017	2018	(Italy) Crotone	Undisclosed	-	-
27	Gaetano Monachello	(Italy)	CF	3 March 1994 (age 32)	2017	2018	(Italy) Atalanta	Free	5	1
23	Corentin Fiore	(Belgium)	LB / CB	24 March 1995 (age 31)	2018	2020	(Belgium) Standard Liège	Free	2	0
9	Stefano Moreo (Note: On loan with an obligation to buy.)	(Italy)	CF / RW	30 June 1993 (age 33)	2018	2018	(Italy) Venezia	€350,000	16	0
1/37 (Note: He wore number 1 against Cagliari and chose number 37 during the season.)	Graziano Belladonna (Note: Aggregated from Youth Sector during the season.)	(Italy)	GK	14 January 2000 (age 26)	2018	2020	(Italy) Youth Sector	N/A	-	-
26	Simone Santoro	(Italy)	CM / DM	20 September 1999 (age 26)	2018	2020	(Italy) Youth Sector	N/A	-	-
29	Mirko Gallo	(Italy)	CB	22 January 2000 (age 26)	2018		(Italy) Youth Sector	N/A	-	-
31	Samuele Guddo	(Italy)	GK	2 July 1999 (age 27)	2017		(Italy) Youth Sector	N/A	-	
34	Agostino Rizzo	(Italy)	RW / RWB	24 March 1999 (age 27)	2018	2020	(Italy) Youth Sector	N/A	-	-

Name	Signed to	Transfer Fee	Notes
Players transferred out during the season
Fabrizio Alastra	(Italy) Prato	Free	Out on loan
Accursio Bentivegna	(Italy) Carrarese	Free	Out on loan
Roberto Pirrello	(Italy) Livorno	Free	Out on loan
Alessandro Diamanti		Free	Released
Simone Lo Faso	(Italy) Fiorentina	€300,000	Out on loan
Gennaro Ruggiero	(Italy) Torino	Free	Out on loan
Cephas Malele	(Portugal) Varzim	Free	Permanent deal
Stefan Silva	(Sweden) AIK	Free	Released
Thiago Cionek	(Italy) SPAL	€150,000	Permanent deal
Gaetano Monachello	(Italy) Atalanta	Free	End of loan
Carlos Embalò	(Italy) Brescia	€150,000	Out on loan
Davide Petermann	(Italy) Sicula Leonzio	Free	Out on loan

== Transfers ==
=== Summer 2017 ===
==== In ====
Date	Pos.	Player	Age	Moving from	Fee	Notes	Source
30 June 2017	DF	(Italy) Andrea Accardi	21	(Italy) Modena	Free	End of loan	
30 June 2017	DF	(Italy) Roberto Pirrello	21	(Italy) Siracusa	Free	End of loan	
30 June 2017	DF	(Slovenia) Aljaž Struna	26	(Italy) Carpi	Free	End of loan	
30 June 2017	GK	(Italy) Fabrizio Alastra	19	(Italy) Benevento	Free	End of loan	
30 June 2017	FW	(Italy) Accursio Bentivegna	21	(Italy) Ascoli	Free	End of loan	
30 June 2017	FW	(Italy) Antonino La Gumina	21	(Italy) Ternana	Free	End of loan	
30 June 2017	FW	(Switzerland) Cephas Malele	23	(Portugal) Varzim	Free	End of loan	
30 June 2017	MF	(Italy) Luca Fiordilino	20	(Italy) Lecce	Free	End of loan	
30 June 2017	MF	(Italy) Davide Petermann	22	(Italy) Carrarese	Free	End of loan	
6 July 2017	DF	(Italy) Andrea Ingegneri	25	(Italy) Pordenone	Undisclosed	Permanent deal	
11 July 2017	FW	(Brazil) Igor Coronado	24	(Italy) Trapani	€1.4M	Permanent deal	
11 July 2017	MF	(Italy) Gabriele Rolando	22	(Italy) Sampdoria	Free	On loan until 30 June 2018	
18 July 2017	MF	(France) Eddy Gnahoré	23	(Italy) Napoli	€1.5M	Permanent deal	
24 July 2017	MF	(Poland) Radosław Murawski	23	(Poland) Piast Gliwice	€650,000	Permanent deal	
2 August 2017	DF	(Italy) Giuseppe Bellusci	27	(England) Leeds United	Free	Permanent deal	
2 August 2017	DF	(Poland) Przemysław Szymiński	23	(Poland) Wisla Plock	€250,000	Permanent deal	
4 August 2017	DF	(Poland) Paweł Dawidowicz	22	(Portugal) Benfica	Free	On loan until 30 June 2018	
7 August 2017	GK	(Italy) Alberto Pomini	36	(Italy) Sassuolo	Undisclosed	Permanent deal	
31 August 2017	FW	(Italy) Gaetano Monachello	23	(Italy) Atalanta	Free	On loan until 30 June 2018	

==== Out ====
Date	Pos.	Player	Age	Moving to	Fee	Notes	Source
15 June 2017	MF	(Brazil) Bruno Henrique	27	(Brazil) Palmeiras	€3.5M	Permanent deal	
22 June 2019	DF	(Costa Rica) Giancarlo González	31	(Italy) Bologna	€1.5M	Permanent deal	
30 June 2017	DF	(Slovenia) Siniša Anđelković	31	(Italy) Venezia	Free	Contract expiration	
30 June 2017	DF	(Italy) Roberto Vitiello	34	(Italy) Ternana	Free	Contract expiration	
30 June 2017	GK	(Canada) Sebastian Breza	19	(Italy) Monopoli	Free	End of loan	
30 June 2017	MF	(Hungary) Roland Sallai	20	(Hungary) Puskás Akadémia	Free	End of loan	
30 June 2017	DF	(Bosnia and Herzegovina) Toni Šunjić	28	(Germany) Stuttgart	Free	End of loan	
30 June 2017	DF	(Italy) Giuseppe Pezzella	19	(Italy) Udinese	€4.5M	Permanent deal	
13 July 2017	FW	(Italy) Francesco Bonfiglio	20	(Italy) Sicula Leonzio	Free	On loan until 30 June 2018	
13 July 2017	DF	(Italy) Simone Giuliano	20	(Italy) Sicula Leonzio	Free	On loan until 30 June 2018	
24 July 2017	MF	(Italy) Alessandro Gazzi	34	(Italy) Alessandria	Free	Released	
27 July 2017	DF	(Italy) Andrea Punzi	20	(Italy) Siracusa	Free	On loan until 30 June 2018	
29 July 2017	DF	(Italy) Edoardo Goldaniga	23	(Italy) Sassuolo	€4M	Permanent deal	
29 July 2017	GK	(Italy) Leonardo Marson	19	(Italy) Sassuolo	Free	On loan until 30 June 2018	
2 August 2017	GK	(Italy) Andrea Fulignati	22	(Italy) Cesena	€400,000	Permanent deal	
8 August 2017	GK	(Italy) Fabrizio Alastra	19	(Italy) Prato	Free	On loan until 30 June 2018	
24 August 2017	FW	(Italy) Accursio Bentivegna	21	(Italy) Carrarese	Free	On loan until 30 June 2018	
25 August 2017	DF	(Italy) Roberto Pirrello	21	(Italy) Livorno	Free	On loan until 30 June 2018	
30 August 2017	MF	(Italy) Gennaro Ruggiero	17	(Italy) Torino	Free	On loan until 30 June 2018	
31 August 2017	FW	(Italy) Alessandro Diamanti	34	Unattached	Free	Released	
31 August 2017	FW	(Italy) Simone Lo Faso	19	(Italy) Fiorentina	€300,000	On loan until 30 June 2018	
31 August 2017	FW	(Switzerland) Cephas Malele	23	(Portugal) Varzim	Free	Permanent deal	

===== Other acquisitions =====
Date	Pos.	Player	Age	Moving from	Fee	Notes	Source
30 June 2017	MF	(Italy) Rosario Costantino	20	(Italy) Gubbio	Free	End of loan	
30 June 2017	MF	(Italy) Dario Giacomarro	22	(Italy) Gubbio	Free	End of loan	
30 June 2017	MF	(Tunisia) Housem Ferchichi	21	(Italy) Livorno	Free	End of loan	
30 June 2017	MF	(Italy) Paolo Grillo	20	(Italy) Siena	Free	End of loan	
30 June 2017	MF	(Sweden) Oscar Hiljemark	25	(Italy) Genoa	Free	End of loan	
30 June 2017	MF	(Italy) Marco Toscano	19	(Italy) Siracusa	Free	End of loan	
30 June 2017	DF	(Morocco) Abdelhamid El Kaoutari	27	(France) Bastia	Free	End of loan	
30 June 2017	FW	(Denmark) Simon Makienok	26	(England) Preston North End	Free	End of loan	
2 August 2017	DF	(Italy) Carmine Setola	18	(Italy) Cesena	Undisclosed	Permanent deal	

===== Other disposals =====
Date	Pos.	Player	Age	Moving to	Fee	Notes	Source
1 July 2017	MF	(Italy) Dario Giacomarro	22	(Italy) Gubbio	Free	On loan until 30 June 2018	
1 July 2017	MF	(Sweden) Oscar Hiljemark	25	(Italy) Genoa	€2.5M	Option to buy exercised	
1 July 2017	FW	(Denmark) Simon Makienok	26	(Netherlands) Utrecht	Undisclosed	Permanent deal	
26 July 2017	MF	(Tunisia) Housem Ferchichi	21	(Italy) Vicenza	Free	On loan until 30 June 2018	
26 July 2017	MF	(Italy) Paolo Grillo	20	(Italy) Siracusa	Free	On loan until 30 June 2018	
27 July 2017	FW	(Italy) Vincenzo Plescia	19	(Italy) Siracusa	Free	On loan until 30 June 2018	
27 July 2017	DF	(Italy) Davide Monteleone	21	(Italy) Sicula Leonzio	Free	On loan until 30 June 2018	
2 August 2017	MF	(Italy) Rosario Costantino	20	(Italy) Fano	Free	On loan until 30 June 2018	
2 August 2017	DF	(Italy) Rosario Damiano Maddaloni	19	(Italy) Fano	Free	On loan until 30 June 2018	
3 August 2017	DF	(Italy) Carmine Setola	18	(Italy) Cesena	Free	On loan until 30 June 2018	
6 August 2017	DF	(Albania) Shaqir Tafa	18	(Italy) Monopoli	Free	On loan until 30 June 2018	
6 August 2017	MF	(Italy) Marco Toscano	20	(Italy) Siracusa	Free	On loan until 30 June 2018	
19 August 2017	DF	(Italy) Antony Angileri	16	(Italy) Juventus	Free	On loan until 30 June 2018	
31 August 2017	FW	(Italy) Felice D'Amico	17	(Italy) Inter Milan	Free	On loan until 30 June 2018	

=== Winter 2018 ===
==== In ====
Date	Pos.	Player	Age	Moving from	Fee	Notes	Source
9 January 2018	DF	(Belgium) Corentin Fiore	22	(Belgium) Standard Liège	Free	Permanent deal	
11 January 2018	FW	(Italy) Stefano Moreo	24	(Italy) Venezia	€350,000	On loan with an obligation to buy for €1M	

==== Out ====
Date	Pos.	Player	Age	Moving to	Fee	Notes	Source
13 January 2018	DF	(Poland) Thiago Cionek	31	(Italy) SPAL	€150,000	Permanent deal	
16 January 2018	FW	(Italy) Gaetano Monachello	23	(Italy) Atalanta	Free	End of loan	
29 January 2018	FW	(Guinea-Bissau) Carlos Embaló	23	(Italy) Brescia	€150,000	On loan until 30 June 2018 with an option to buy	
31 January 2018	MF	(Italy) Davide Petermann	23	(Italy) Sicula Leonzio	Free	On loan until 30 June 2018	

===== Other acquisitions =====
Date	Pos.	Player	Age	Moving from	Fee	Notes	Source
23 January 2018	FW	(Italy) Vincenzo Plescia	19	(Italy) Siracusa	Free	End of loan	
30 January 2018	FW	(Italy) Francesco Bonfiglio	21	(Italy) Sicula Leonzio	Free	End of loan	
30 January 2018	DF	(Italy) Carmine Setola	19	(Italy) Cesena	Free	End of loan	

===== Other disposals =====
Date	Pos.	Player	Age	Moving to	Fee	Notes	Source
12 January 2018	DF	(Morocco) Abdelhamid El Kaoutari	27	(Morocco) Wydad Casablanca	Free	Permanent deal	
24 January 2018	FW	(Italy) Vincenzo Plescia	19	(Italy) Roccella	Free	On loan until 30 June 2018	
27 January 2018	FW	(Italy) Fabio Brasile	18	(Italy) Gela	Free	On loan until 30 June 2018	
27 January 2018	DF	(Italy) Riccardo Mansueto	18	(Italy) Gela	Free	On loan until 30 June 2018	
31 January 2018	FW	(Italy) Francesco Bonfiglio	21	(Italy) AlbinoLeffe	Free	On loan until 30 June 2018	
31 January 2018	DF	(Italy) Carmine Setola	19	(Italy) Pisa	Free	On loan until 30 June 2018	

Total expenditure: €4.15M

Total revenue: €17M

Net income: ▲€12.85M

== Competitions ==
=== Overall ===
Competition	First match	Last match	Starting round	Final position	Record							
Competition	First match	Last match	Starting round	Final position	Pld	W	D	L	GF	GA	GD	Win %
Serie B	26 August 2017	18 May 2018	Matchday 1	4th	42	18	17	7	59	39	+20	42.86
Play-offs	6 June 2018	16 June 2018	Semi-finals	Runners-up	4	2	1	1	4	4	+0	50.00
Coppa Italia	6 August 2017	12 August 2017	Second round	Third round	2	1	1	0	6	1	+5	50.00
Total					48	21	19	8	69	44	+25	43.75

Source: Competitive matches

=== Serie B ===
==== League table ====
Pos	Team	Pld	W	D	L	GF	GA	GD	Pts	Promotion, qualification or relegation
2	Parma (P)	42	21	9	12	57	37	+20	72 (Note: Parma is ahead of Frosinone on head-to-head goal difference: Parma 2–0 Frosinone, Frosinone 2–1 Parma.)	Promotion to Serie A
3	Frosinone (O, P)	42	19	15	8	65	47	+18	72	Qualification to promotion play-offs semi-finals
4	Palermo	42	18	17	7	59	39	+20	71	Qualification to promotion play-offs semi-finals
5	Venezia	42	17	16	9	56	42	+14	67	Qualification to promotion play-offs preliminary round
6	Cittadella	42	18	12	12	61	48	+13	66	Qualification to promotion play-offs preliminary round

Source: Lega Serie B
Rules for classification: 1) Points; 2) Head-to-head points; 3) Head-to-head goal difference; 4) Goal difference; 5) Goals scored; 6) Draw.
(O) Play-off winners; (P) Promoted

==== Results summary ====
Overall								Home						Away					
Pld	W	D	L	GF	GA	GD	Pts	W	D	L	GF	GA	GD	W	D	L	GF	GA	GD
42	18	17	7	59	39	+20	71	11	7	3	33	16	+17	7	10	4	26	23	+3

Source: Competitive matches

==== Results by round ====
Round	1	2	3	4	5	6	7	8	9	10	11	12	13	14	15	16	17	18	19	20	21	22	23	24	25	26	27	28	29	30	31	32	33	34	35	36	37	38	39	40	41	42
Ground	H	A	H	A	H	H	A	H	A	H	A	H	A	A	H	A	H	A	H	A	H	A	H	A	H	A	A	H	A (Note: Match was played between weeks 33 and 34.)	H	A	H	A	H	H	A	H	A	H	A	H	A
Result	W	D	D	D	W	W	D	D	D	L	W	W	D	W	L	W	D	W	W	D	W	D	W	L	L	L	D	W	L	W	D	W	W	D	D	D	W	L	D	W	D	W
Position	4	5	7	6	5	3	3	2	2	8	3	1	2	1	5	2	3	1	1	1	1	2	2	3	3	3	3	3	4	3	3	3	3	2	2	4	3	3	4	3	4	4

Source: Competitive matches
A = Away; H = Home; W = Win; D = Draw; L = Loss

=== Matches ===
==== Serie B ====
26 August 2017 1	Palermo	2–0	Spezia	Palermo
20:30 CEST (UTC+02:00)	Trajkovski 10'; Struna (yellow card) 40'; Nestorovski 52'; Posavec (yellow card) 81'	Report	(yellow card) 35' Terzi; (yellow card) 47' Sciaudone	Stadium: Renzo Barbera; Attendance: 6,769; Referee: Luigi Nasca

2 September 2017 2	Brescia	0–0	Palermo	Brescia
18:00 CEST (UTC+02:00)	Furlan (yellow card) 50'; Coppolaro (yellow card) 67'; Martinelli (yellow card) 90+2'	Report		Stadium: Mario Rigamonti; Attendance: 5,081; Referee: Antonio Rapuano

9 September 2017 3	Palermo	3–3	Empoli	Palermo
15:00 CEST (UTC+02:00)	Cionek 10'; Coronado 14'; Gnahoré 77' (yellow card) 90+3'; Trajkovski (yellow card) 90+1'; Rispoli (yellow card) 90+4'	Report	23' Šimić; 54', 90+4' (pen.) (yellow card) 85' Caputo; (yellow card) 65' Castagnetti	Stadium: Renzo Barbera; Attendance: 6,270; Referee: Aleandro Di Paolo

16 September 2017 4	Foggia	1–1	Palermo	Foggia
15:00 CEST (UTC+02:00)	Nicastro 42'; Loiacono (yellow card) 69'	Report	(yellow card) 39' Cionek; (yellow card) 41' Jajalo; 80' Murawski	Stadium: Pino Zaccheria; Attendance: 11,245; Referee: Daniele Chiffi

19 September 2017 5	Palermo	1–0	Perugia	Palermo
20:30 CEST (UTC+02:00)	Struna (yellow card) 30'; Murawski (yellow card) 40'; Chochev (yellow card) 45'; Gnahoré (yellow card) 80'; Nestorovski 81' (yellow card) 83'; Bellusci (red card) 90'	Report	(yellow card) 37' Colombatto; (yellow card) 42' Bandinelli	Stadium: Renzo Barbera; Attendance: 6,844; Referee: Riccardo Ros

25 September 2017 6	Palermo	2–1	Pro Vercelli	Palermo
20:30 CEST (UTC+02:00)	Nestorovski 25', 51' (yellow card) 72' (yellow-red card) 85'; Murawski (yellow card) 84'	Report	20' Bifulco; (yellow card) 78' Bergamelli; (yellow card) 80' Vives; (yellow card) 84' Mammarella	Stadium: Renzo Barbera; Attendance: 6,573; Referee: Niccolò Baroni

30 September 2017 7	Ascoli	0–0	Palermo	Ascoli Piceno
15:00 CEST (UTC+02:00)	Addae (yellow card) 87'	Report	(yellow card) 30' Murawski; (yellow card) 55' Morganella	Stadium: Cino e Lillo Del Duca; Attendance: 5,577; Referee: Riccardo Pinzani

8 October 2017 8	Palermo	1–1	Parma	Palermo
15:00 CEST (UTC+02:00)	La Gumina 10'; Bellusci (yellow card) 33'; Embaló (yellow card) 38'; Murawski (yellow card) 45+2'	Report	(yellow card) 21' (goal) 71' Gagliolo; (yellow card) 59' Scozzarella; (yellow card) 82' Barillà	Stadium: Renzo Barbera; Attendance: 7,256; Referee: Juan Manuel Sacchi

14 October 2017 9	Frosinone	0–0	Palermo	Frosinone
15:00 CEST (UTC+02:00)	M. Ciofani (yellow card) 8'; Ariaudo (yellow card) 31'; Terranova (yellow card) 44'	Report	(yellow card) 42' Rispoli; (yellow card) 81' Jajalo	Stadium: Benito Stirpe; Attendance: 12,430; Referee: Federico La Penna

21 October 2017 10	Palermo	0–2	Novara	Palermo
15:00 CEST (UTC+02:00)	Struna (yellow card) 55'; Jajalo (yellow card) 72'	Report	(yellow card) 47' Mantovani; 53', 70' Moscati; (yellow card) 63' Da Cruz	Stadium: Renzo Barbera; Attendance: 6,068; Referee: Lorenzo Illuzzi

24 October 2017 11	Carpi	1–3	Palermo	Carpi
20:30 CEST (UTC+02:00)	Pasciuti (yellow card) 31'; Sabbione (yellow card) 41' (goal) 82'	Report	10', 36' Nestorovski; 83' Embaló	Stadium: Sandro Cabassi; Attendance: 2,430; Referee: Aleandro Di Paolo

28 October 2017 12	Palermo	2–0	Virtus Entella	Palermo
15:00 CEST (UTC+02:00)	Jajalo (yellow card) 17'; Nestorovski 23' (pen.), 48'; Chochev (yellow card) 63'; Coronado (yellow card) 67'	Report	(yellow card) 22' (yellow-red card) 80' Pellizzer; (yellow card) 47' Benedetti; (yellow card) 68' Crimi	Stadium: Renzo Barbera; Attendance: 4,963; Referee: Gianluca Aureliano

3 November 2017 13	Pescara	2–2	Palermo	Pescara
20:30 CET (UTC+01:00)	Capone 10'; Brugman 46'; Carraro (yellow card) 52'; Coda (yellow card) 80'; Bovo (yellow card) 89'	Report	15' Chochev; 33' Nestorovski	Stadium: Adriatico – Giovanni Cornacchia; Attendance: 7,621; Referee: Antonio Giua

12 November 2017 14	Cremonese	1–2	Palermo	Cremona
15:00 CET (UTC+01:00)	Claiton 21'; Almici (yellow card) 32'; Arini (yellow card) 44'; Renzetti (yellow card) 90+6'	Report	23' Rispoli; 52' Chochev	Stadium: Giovanni Zini; Attendance: 7,461; Referee: Eugenio Abbattista

20 November 2017 15	Palermo	0–3	Cittadella	Palermo
20:30 CET (UTC+01:00)	Bellusci (yellow card) 21'	Report	(yellow card) 22' Caccin; (yellow card) 34' Schenetti; 43' Kouamé; 64' Strizzolo; 82' Salvi; (yellow card) 84' Iori	Stadium: Renzo Barbera; Attendance: 7,803; Referee: Davide Ghersini

25 November 2017 16	Avellino	1–3	Palermo	Avellino
15:00 CET (UTC+01:00)	Paghera (yellow card) 45+4'; Migliorini (yellow card) 68'; Molina 81'	Report	36' (o.g.) Molina; (red card) 42' Cionek; 48' Gnahoré; 77' Nestorovski	Stadium: Partenio-Adriano Lombardi; Attendance: 3,783; Referee: Luigi Nasca

2 December 2017 17	Palermo	0–0	Venezia	Palermo
18:00 CET (UTC+01:00)	Murawski (yellow card) 33'; Dawidowicz (yellow card) 83'; Jajalo (yellow card) 88'	Report	(yellow card) 44' Bentivoglio; (yellow card) 79' (yellow-red card) 79' Domizzi	Stadium: Renzo Barbera; Attendance: 4,842; Referee: Daniele Chiffi

10 December 2017 18	Bari	0–3	Palermo	Bari
17:30 CET (UTC+01:00)	Marrone (yellow card) 52'	Report	(yellow card) 44' Dawidowicz; 62' Rispoli; 69' Trajkovski; 75' Coronado	Stadium: San Nicola; Attendance: 21,671; Referee: Riccardo Pinzani

16 December 2017 19	Palermo	1–0	Ternana	Palermo
15:00 CET (UTC+01:00)	Rispoli 2'	Report	(yellow card) 28' Favalli; (yellow card) 55' Zanon; (yellow card) 90+2' Paolucci	Stadium: Renzo Barbera; Attendance: 5,514; Referee: Daniele Martinelli

21 December 2017 20	Cesena	1–1	Palermo	Cesena
20:30 CET (UTC+01:00)	Jallow 34'; Scognamiglio (yellow card) 37'	Report	9' Trajkovski; (yellow card) 48' Bellusci	Stadium: Dino Manuzzi; Attendance: 11,303; Referee: Juan Manuel Sacchi

28 December 2017 21	Palermo	3–0	Salernitana	Palermo
20:30 CET (UTC+01:00)	Chochev 30'; Murawski (yellow card) 55'; Monachello 79'; Jajalo 90+3'	Report	(yellow card) 20' Minala; (yellow card) 32' Zito; (yellow card) 43' (yellow-red card) 52' Vitale	Stadium: Renzo Barbera; Attendance: 5,768; Referee: Daniele Minelli

20 January 2018 22	Spezia	0–0	Palermo	La Spezia
18:00 CET (UTC+01:00)	Bolzoni (yellow card) 74'	Report	(yellow card) 57' Struna; (yellow card) 74' Aleesami	Stadium: Alberto Picco; Attendance: 6,886; Referee: Marco Piccinini

27 January 2018 23	Palermo	2–0	Brescia	Palermo
15:00 CET (UTC+01:00)	Chochev 3'; Bellusci (yellow card) 53'; Gnahoré 90+3'	Report	(yellow card) 51' Bisoli; (yellow card) 64' Martinelli	Stadium: Renzo Barbera; Attendance: 6,799; Referee: Marco Serra

2 February 2018 24	Empoli	4–0	Palermo	Empoli
20:30 CET (UTC+01:00)	Brighi 12'; Caputo 45', 51', 82' (pen.); Zajc (yellow card) 47'; Veseli (yellow card) 53'	Report	(yellow card) 31' Struna; (yellow card) 72' Rolando	Stadium: Carlo Castellani; Attendance: 5,128; Referee: Federico La Penna

12 February 2018 25	Palermo	1–2	Foggia	Palermo
20:30 CET (UTC+01:00)	Nestorovski 65' (pen.); Coronado (red card) 69'	Report	(yellow card) 36' Greco; (yellow card) 64' Loiacono; 78' Duhamel; 84' Kragl	Stadium: Renzo Barbera; Attendance: 13,031; Referee: Eugenio Abbattista

17 February 2018 26	Perugia	1–0	Palermo	Perugia
15:00 CET (UTC+01:00)	Gustafson (yellow card) 55'; Di Carmine 90+1'; Leali (yellow card) 90+5'	Report	(yellow card) 87' Jajalo	Stadium: Renato Curi; Attendance: 8,380; Referee: Daniele Chiffi

24 February 2018 27	Pro Vercelli	0–0	Palermo	Vercelli
15:00 CET (UTC+01:00)	Bergamelli (yellow card) 22'	Report	(yellow card) 53' Jajalo; (yellow card) 69' Struna	Stadium: Silvio Piola; Attendance: 2,895; Referee: Valerio Marini

27 February 2018 28	Palermo	4–1	Ascoli	Palermo
20:30 CET (UTC+01:00)	Rispoli 46', 55' (yellow card) 53'; Coronado 48'; La Gumina (yellow card) 51'; Nestorovski 83'	Report	(yellow card) 29' Gigliotti; 42' Bianchi; (yellow card) 63' Clemenza; (yellow card) 81' Mignanelli	Stadium: Renzo Barbera; Attendance: 6,466; Referee: Daniele Martinelli

2 April 2018 29	Parma	3–2	Palermo	Parma
20:30 CEST (UTC+02:00)	Calaiò 31', 39' (pen.), 47'; Lucarelli (yellow card) 66'; Scavone (yellow card) 90+4'	Report	(yellow card) 32' (goal) 52' Nestorovski; (yellow card) 33' Pomini; (yellow card) 35' Rispoli; (yellow card) 64' Coronado; (yellow card) 70' Gnahoré; 90+4' Rajković	Stadium: Ennio Tardini; Attendance: 11,261; Referee: Livio Marinelli
Note: Match was postponed from its original date of 3 March due to snow.

10 March 2018 30	Palermo	1–0	Frosinone	Palermo
18:00 CEST (UTC+02:00)	Bellusci (yellow card) 34'; Gnahoré 47'; Nestorovski (yellow card) 79'	Report	(yellow card) 28' Chibsah; (yellow card) 37' Terranova; (yellow card) 53' M. Ciofani	Stadium: Renzo Barbera; Attendance: 15,121; Referee: Riccardo Pinzani

17 March 2018 31	Novara	2–2	Palermo	Novara
15:00 CEST (UTC+01:00)	Pușcaș 8'; Golubović (yellow card) 72' (yellow-red card) 89'; Sciaudone 90'	Report	(yellow card) 20' Szymiński; (yellow card) 30' Coronado; 48' Rispoli; 56' (yellow card) 77' La Gumina; (yellow card) 73' Nestorovski	Stadium: Silvio Piola; Attendance: 4,182; Referee: Marco Serra

25 March 2018 32	Palermo	4–0	Carpi	Palermo
15:00 CEST (UTC+02:00)	Coronado 18' (pen.), 47', 76'; La Gumina 67'	Report	(yellow card) 69' Brosco	Stadium: Renzo Barbera; Attendance: 6,523; Referee: Davide Ghersini

29 March 2018 33	Virtus Entella	1–2	Palermo	Chiavari
20:30 CEST (UTC+02:00)	Gatto 80'	Report	17' La Gumina; (yellow card) 19' Jajalo; (yellow card) 55' Struna; 74' (o.g.) De Santis	Stadium: Comunale; Attendance: 2,492; Referee: Francesco Fourneau

7 April 2018 34	Palermo	1–1	Pescara	Palermo
15:00 CEST (UTC+02:00)	Coronado 24'; Jajalo (yellow card) 82'; Gnahorè (yellow card) 84'	Report	(yellow card) 20' Coda; 39' Valzania	Stadium: Renzo Barbera; Attendance: 11,234; Referee: Fabio Piscopo

14 April 2018 35	Palermo	1–1	Cremonese	Palermo
15:00 CEST (UTC+02:00)	Aleesami (yellow card) 45+1'; Coronado 61'; La Gumina (yellow card) 90+3'	Report	83' Scamacca; (yellow card) 90+2' García; (yellow card) 90+5' Arini	Stadium: Renzo Barbera; Attendance: 10,768; Referee: Federico La Penna

17 April 2018 36	Cittadella	0–0	Palermo	Cittadella
20:30 CEST (UTC+02:00)	Chiaretti (yellow card) 12'	Report	(yellow card) 12' Jajalo; (yellow card) 46' Struna; (yellow card) 55' Gnahoré; (yellow card) 77' Coronado	Stadium: Pier Cesare Tombolato; Attendance: 3,984; Referee: Luigi Nasca

21 April 2018 37	Palermo	3–0	Avellino	Palermo
15:00 CEST (UTC+02:00)	Coronado 9' (pen.) (yellow card) 71'; La Gumina 47'; Trajkovski 73' (pen.)	Report	(yellow card) 8' Morero; (yellow card) 52' Molina; (yellow card) 77' De Risio	Stadium: Renzo Barbera; Attendance: 9,173; Referee: Antonio Giua

27 April 2018 38	Venezia	3–0	Palermo	Venice
19:00 CEST (UTC+02:00)	Suciu 11'; Štulac 16'; Anđelković 64'	Report		Stadium: Pier Luigi Penzo; Attendance: 5,767; Referee: Marco Piccinini

30 April 2018 39	Palermo	1–1	Bari	Palermo
20:30 CEST (UTC+02:00)	Chochev (yellow card) 46'; La Gumina 80'; Rolando (yellow card) 88'	Report	(yellow card) 31' (goal) 88' Nenê; (yellow card) 36' Empereur; (yellow card) 66' Balkovec; (yellow card) 76' (yellow-red card) 85' Marrone; (yellow card) 88' Basha; (red card) 90+3' Henderson	Stadium: Renzo Barbera; Attendance: 18,613; Referee: Gianluca Aureliano

5 May 2018 40	Ternana	2–3	Palermo	Terni
15:00 CEST (UTC+02:00)	Favalli (yellow card) 45+2'; Vitiello (yellow card) 78'; Finotto 79'; Tremolada 83'	Report	22', 45' La Gumina; (yellow card) 39' Dawidowicz; 61' Rolando; (yellow card) 82' Pomini	Stadium: Libero Liberati; Attendance: 4,455; Referee: Daniele Minelli

12 May 2018 41	Palermo	0–0	Cesena	Palermo
15:00 CEST (UTC+02:00)	Murawski (yellow card) 48'	Report	(yellow card) 16' Donkor; (yellow card) 68' Cascione	Stadium: Renzo Barbera; Attendance: 23,207; Referee: Ivano Pezzuto

18 May 2018 42	Salernitana	0–2	Palermo	Salerno
20:30 CEST (UTC+02:00)	Rossi (yellow card) 33'; Vitale (yellow card) 70'; Mantovani (yellow card) 87'	Report	(yellow card) 22' Rajković; 45+1' Chochev; 86' La Gumina	Stadium: Arechi; Attendance: 7,654; Referee: Niccolò Baroni

=== Play-offs ===
==== Semi-finals ====
6 June 2018 First leg	Venezia	1–1	Palermo	Venice
21:00 CEST (UTC+02:00)	Štulac (yellow card) 51'; Marsura 57'	Report	53' La Gumina; (yellow card) 58' Bellusci; (yellow card) 85' Aleesami	Stadium: Pier Luigi Penzo; Attendance: 5,526; Referee: Daniele Chiffi

10 June 2018 Second leg	Palermo	1–0 (2–1 agg.)	Venezia	Palermo
20:30 CEST (UTC+02:00)	Domizzi 5' (o.g.); Jajalo (yellow card) 33'; Coronado (yellow card) 85'; Fiordilino (yellow card) 90+1'	Report	(yellow card) 34' Modolo; (red card) 81' Pinato	Stadium: Renzo Barbera; Attendance: 28,152; Referee: Gianluca Aureliano

==== Final ====
13 June 2018 First leg	Palermo	2–1	Frosinone	Palermo
20:30 CEST (UTC+02:00)	La Gumina 45'; Murawski (yellow card) 80'; Terranova 81' (o.g.)	Report	5' Ciano; (yellow card) 90+3' Frara	Stadium: Renzo Barbera; Attendance: 29,050; Referee: Daniele Chiffi

16 June 2018 Second leg	Frosinone	2–0 (3–2 agg.)	Palermo	Frosinone
20:30 CEST (UTC+02:00)	Krajnc (yellow card) 4'; Soddimo (yellow card) 6'; Dionisi (yellow card) 21'; M. Ciofani (yellow card) 49'; Maiello 52'; Ciano 90+6'	Report	(yellow card) 17' Jajalo; (yellow card) 28' Aleesami; (yellow card) 39' Nestorovski; (red card) 63' Dawidowicz; (yellow card) 69' Szymiński; (yellow card) 79' Struna	Stadium: Benito Stirpe; Attendance: 15,443; Referee: Federico La Penna

=== Coppa Italia ===
6 August 2017 Second round	Palermo	5–0	Virtus Francavilla	Palermo
20:30 CEST (UTC+02:00)	Trajkovski 12', 45+2', 72'; Aleesami (yellow card) 23' (goal) 66'; Bellusci (yellow card) 41'; Murawski 80'	Report	(yellow card) 90' Biasón	Stadium: Renzo Barbera; Attendance: 5,424; Referee: Daniele Martinelli

12 August 2017 Third round	Cagliari	1–1 (a.e.t.) (4–2 p)	Palermo	Turin
21:15 CEST (UTC+02:00)	João Pedro 45'; Pisacane (yellow card) 53'; Barella (yellow card) 56'; Farias (yellow card) 89'	Report	(yellow card) 8' Jajalo; (yellow card) 46' Struna; 66' La Gumina	Stadium: Olimpico Grande Torino; Attendance: 1,126; Referee: Paolo Valeri
	Penalties
	Cigarini (penalty scored); Čop (penalty scored); Sau (penalty scored); Cossu (penalty scored)		(penalty missed) Jajalo; (penalty missed) Aleesami; (penalty scored) Struna; (penalty scored) La Gumina

=== Appearances and goals ===
As of 16 June 2018

No.	Pos	Nat	Player	Total		Serie B		Play-offs		Coppa Italia	
No.	Pos	Nat	Player	Apps	Goals	Apps	Goals	Apps	Goals	Apps	Goals
Goalkeepers
1	GK	(Italy) ITA	Fabrizio Alastra	0	0	0	0	0	0	0	0
1/37	GK	(Italy) ITA	Graziano Belladonna	0	0	0	0	0	0	0	0
1	GK	(Italy) ITA	Luca Maniero	0	0	0	0	0	0	0	0
12	GK	(Croatia) CRO	Josip Posavec	21	-20	19	-19	0	0	2	-1
22	GK	(Italy) ITA	Alberto Pomini	27	-24	23	-20	4	-4	0	0
31	GK	(Italy) ITA	Samuele Guddo	0	0	0	0	0	0	0	0
Defenders
2	DF	(Italy) ITA	Giuseppe Bellusci	27	0	23	0	2	0	2	0
3	DF	(Italy) ITA	Andrea Rispoli	43	6	38	6	4	0	1	0
4	DF	(Italy) ITA	Andrea Accardi	8	0	7	0	0	0	1	0
5	DF	(Serbia) SRB	Slobodan Rajković	16	1	12	1	4	0	0	0
6	DF	(Slovenia) SVN	Aljaž Struna	39	0	35	0	2	0	2	0
14	DF	(Italy) ITA	Gabriele Rolando	14	1	12	1	2	0	0	0
15	DF	(Poland) POL	Thiago Cionek	18	1	16	1	0	0	2	0
17	DF	(Switzerland) SUI	Michel Morganella	12	0	10	0	0	0	2	0
19	DF	(Norway) NOR	Haitam Aleesami	32	1	26	0	4	0	2	1
23	DF	(Belgium) BEL	Corentin Fiore	2	0	2	0	0	0	0	0
24	DF	(Poland) POL	Przemysław Szymiński	28	0	26	0	2	0	0	0
28	DF	(Poland) POL	Paweł Dawidowicz	29	0	27	0	2	0	0	0
29/31	DF	(Italy) ITA	Roberto Pirrello	0	0	0	0	0	0	0	0
29	DF	(Italy) ITA	Mirko Gallo	0	0	0	0	0	0	0	0
32	DF	(Italy) ITA	Andrea Ingegneri	0	0	0	0	0	0	0	0
Midfielders
8	MF	(Bosnia and Herzegovina) BIH	Mato Jajalo	41	1	35	1	4	0	2	0
13	MF	(France) FRA	Eddy Gnahoré	36	4	32	4	3	0	1	0
18	MF	(Bulgaria) BUL	Ivaylo Chochev	31	5	29	5	0	0	2	0
21	MF	(Italy) ITA	Luca Fiordilino	14	0	12	0	2	0	0	0
26	MF	(Italy) ITA	Gennaro Ruggiero	0	0	0	0	0	0	0	0
26	MF	(Italy) ITA	Simone Santoro	0	0	0	0	0	0	0	0
33	MF	(Italy) ITA	Davide Petermann	1	0	1	0	0	0	0	0
35	MF	(Poland) POL	Radosław Murawski	41	2	35	1	4	0	2	1
Forwards
7	FW	(North Macedonia) MKD	Aleksandar Trajkovski	33	7	27	4	4	0	2	3
9	FW	(Sweden) SWE	Stefan Silva	0	0	0	0	0	0	0	0
9	FW	(Italy) ITA	Stefano Moreo	16	0	15	0	1	0	0	0
10	FW	(Brazil) BRA	Igor Coronado	43	9	38	9	4	0	1	0
11	FW	(Guinea-Bissau) GNB	Carlos Embaló	16	1	16	1	0	0	0	0
16	FW	(Hungary) HUN	Norbert Balogh	2	0	2	0	0	0	0	0
20	FW	(Italy) ITA	Antonino La Gumina	35	12	29	9	4	2	2	1
23	FW	(Italy) ITA	Alessandro Diamanti	0	0	0	0	0	0	0	0
27	FW	(Italy) ITA	Accursio Bentivegna	0	0	0	0	0	0	0	0
27	FW	(Italy) ITA	Gaetano Monachello	5	1	5	1	0	0	0	0
30	FW	(North Macedonia) MKD	Ilija Nestorovski	33	13	28	13	3	0	2	0
34	FW	(Italy) ITA	Simone Lo Faso	0	0	0	0	0	0	0	0
34	FW	(Italy) ITA	Agostino Rizzo	0	0	0	0	0	0	0	0
36	FW	(Switzerland) SUI	Cephas Malele	0	0	0	0	0	0	0	0

=== Goalscorers ===
As of 16 June 2018

Rank	No.	Pos	Nat	Name	Serie B	Play-offs	Coppa Italia	Total
1	30	FW	(North Macedonia)	Ilija Nestorovski	13			13
2	20	FW	(Italy)	Antonino La Gumina	9	2	1	12
3	10	FW	(Brazil)	Igor Coronado	9			9
4	7	FW	(North Macedonia)	Aleksandar Trajkovski	4		3	7
5	3	DF	(Italy)	Andrea Rispoli	6			6
6	18	MF	(Bulgaria)	Ivaylo Chochev	5			5
7	13	MF	(France)	Eddy Gnahoré	4			4
8	35	MF	(Poland)	Radosław Murawski	1		1	2
9	19	DF	(Norway)	Haitam Aleesami			1	1
9	15	DF	(Poland)	Thiago Cionek	1			1
9	11	FW	(Guinea-Bissau)	Carlos Embaló	1			1
9	8	MF	(Bosnia and Herzegovina)	Mato Jajalo	1			1
9	27	FW	(Italy)	Gaetano Monachello	1			1
9	5	DF	(Serbia)	Slobodan Rajković	1			1
9	14	DF	(Italy)	Gabriele Rolando	1			1
Own goal					2	2		4
Totals					59	4	6	69

=== Clean sheets ===
As of 16 June 2018.

Rank	No.	Pos	Nat	Name	Serie B	Play-offs	Coppa Italia	Total
1	22	GK	(Italy)	Alberto Pomini	10 (Note: Weeks: 2, 9, 22, 27, 30, 32, 36-37, 41-42.)	1		11
2	12	GK	(Croatia)	Josip Posavec	9 (Note: Weeks: 1, 5, 7, 12, 17-19, 21, 23.)		1	10
Totals					19	1	1	21

=== Disciplinary record ===
As of 16 June 2018

No.	Pos	Nat	Name	Serie B			Play-offs			Coppa Italia			Total		
No.	Pos	Nat	Name	Booked	(yellow card) (yellow-red card)	Sent off (straight red)	Booked	(yellow card) (yellow-red card)	Sent off (straight red)	Booked	(yellow card) (yellow-red card)	Sent off (straight red)	Booked	(yellow card) (yellow-red card)	Sent off (straight red)
2	DF	(Italy)	Giuseppe Bellusci	5		1	1			1			7	0	1
10	FW	(Brazil)	Igor Coronado	5		1	1						6	0	1
28	DF	(Poland)	Paweł Dawidowicz	3					1				3	0	1
15	DF	(Poland)	Thiago Cionek	1		1							1	0	1
30	FW	(North Macedonia)	Ilija Nestorovski	4	1		1						5	1	0
8	MF	(Bosnia and Herzegovina)	Mato Jajalo	10			2			1			13	0	0
6	DF	(Slovenia)	Aljaž Struna	8			1			1			10	0	0
35	MF	(Poland)	Radosław Murawski	7			1						8	0	0
19	DF	(Norway)	Haitam Aleesami	2			2			1			5	0	0
13	MF	(France)	Eddy Gnahoré	5									5	0	0
3	DF	(Italy)	Andrea Rispoli	4									4	0	0
18	MF	(Bulgaria)	Ivaylo Chochev	3									3	0	0
20	FW	(Italy)	Antonino La Gumina	3									3	0	0
22	GK	(Italy)	Alberto Pomini	2									2	0	0
14	DF	(Italy)	Gabriele Rolando	2									2	0	0
24	DF	(Poland)	Przemysław Szymiński	1			1						2	0	0
11	FW	(Guinea-Bissau)	Carlos Embaló	1									1	0	0
21	MF	(Italy)	Luca Fiordilino				1						1	0	0
17	DF	(Switzerland)	Michel Morganella	1									1	0	0
12	GK	(Croatia)	Josip Posavec	1									1	0	0
5	DF	(Serbia)	Slobodan Rajković	1									1	0	0
7	FW	(North Macedonia)	Aleksandar Trajkovski	1									1	0	0
Totals				70	1	3	11	0	1	4	0	0	85	1	4

=== Attendances ===
As of 13 June 2018.

	Matches	Attendances	Average	High	Low
Serie B	21	189,605	9,029	23,207	4,842
Play-offs	2	57,202	28,601	29,050	28,152
Coppa Italia	1	5,424	5,424	5,424	5,424
Total	24	252,231	10,510	29,050	4,842
