= Igor Coronado =

Brazilian footballer (born 1992)

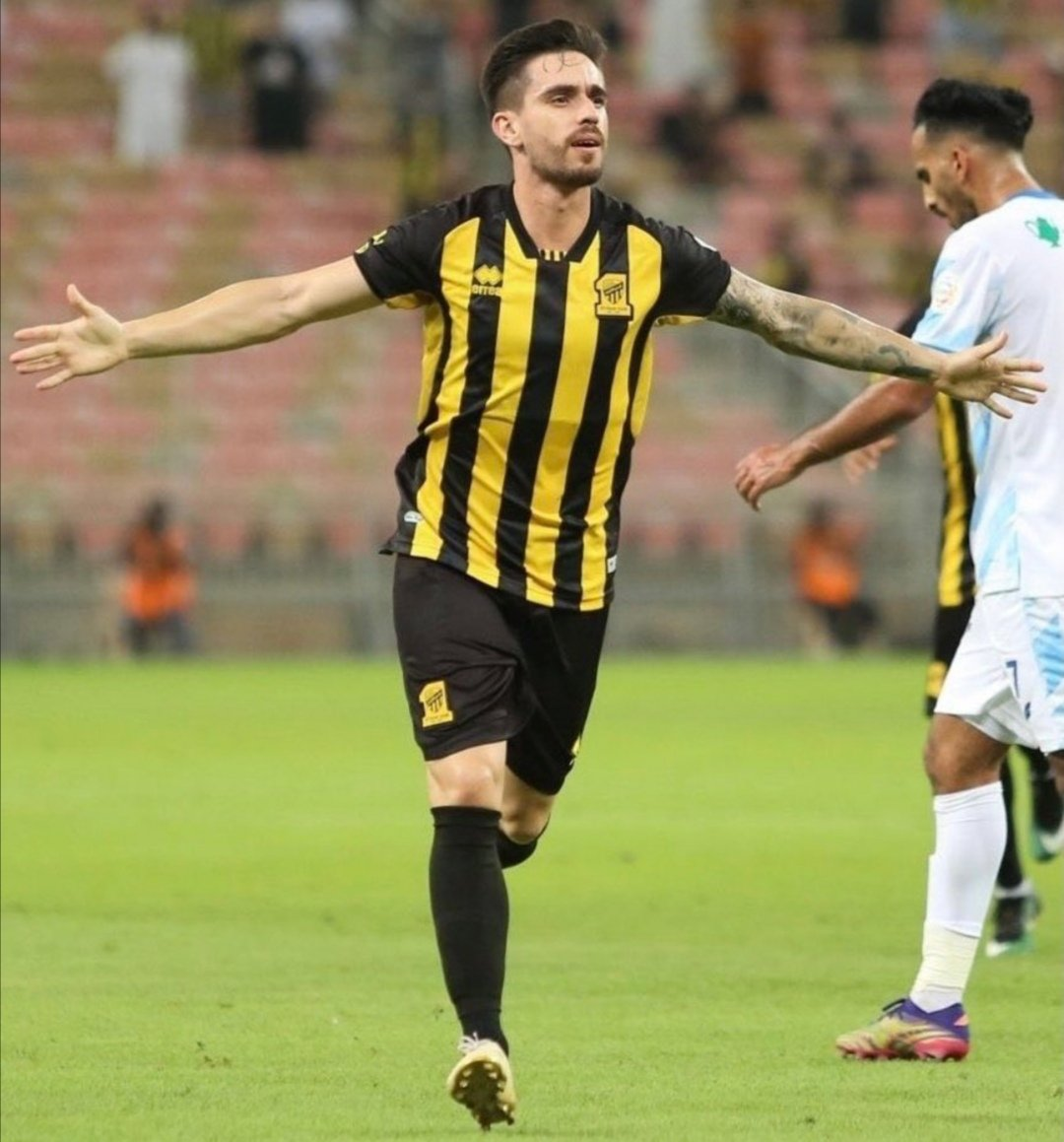
- Coronado with Al-Ittihad in 2021

Personal information
- Full name: Igor Caique Coronado
- Date of birth: 18 August 1992 (age 34)
- Place of birth: Londrina, Brazil
- Height: 1.70 m (5 ft 7 in)
- Position: Attacking midfielder

Team information
- Current team: Sharjah
- Number: 77

Youth career
- 2007–2011: Milton Keynes Dons
- 2011–2012: Grasshoppers

Senior career*
Years	Team	Apps	(Gls)
2011	Milton Keynes Dons	0	(0)
2012	Banbury United	4	(1)
2012–2016	Floriana	63	(32)
2015–2016	→ Trapani (loan)	41	(8)
2016–2017	Trapani	34	(11)
2017–2018	Palermo	42	(9)
2018–2021	Sharjah	62	(41)
2021–2024	Al-Ittihad	62	(16)
2024–2025	Corinthians	46	(4)
2025–	Sharjah	7	(2)
- * Club domestic league appearances and goals as of 21:40, 22 December 2025 (UTC)

Igor Caique Coronado (born 18 August 1992) is a Brazilian professional footballer who is an attacking midfielder who plays for UAE Pro League club Sharjah.

== Club career ==
=== Early years ===
Coronado joined the academy of English club Milton Keynes Dons at the age of 15 in 2007. On 7 May 2011, at the age of 18, he was named amongst the substitutes for the club's final game of the 2010–11 season against Oldham Athletic.

Following his release from the club after the end of the season, Coronado joined the reserve team of Swiss club Grasshoppers for a brief period before signing for English seventh-tier club Banbury United.

=== Floriana ===
In November 2012, Coronado joined Maltese Premier League club Floriana. His league debut for Floriana came on 10 November 2012 in a 2–2 away draw with Melita. His first league goal for the club came on 10 December 2012 in a 3–1 home win over Balzan. His goal, the third of the match for Floriana, came in the 48th minute. During his time with the club, Coronado scored a total of 32 goals in 63 league appearances, including three hat-tricks.

=== Trapani ===
On 12 August 2015, Coronado joined Italian Serie B club Trapani on a season-long loan. On 6 September 2015, he made his debut for the club, scoring in a 3–0 home win over Ternana. His first league goal for the club also came in that match, coming in the 52nd minute.

=== Palermo ===
On 11 July 2017, Coronado joined newly relegated Serie B club Palermo on a four-year contract. His league debut came on 26 August 2017 in a 2–0 home win over Spezia Calcio. He picked up an assist in that match, setting up Ilija Nestorovski for his 52nd-minute goal. His first league goal for Palermo came on 9 September 2017 in a 3–3 home draw with Empoli. His goal, assisted by Eddy Gnahoré, came in the 14th minute. His first league hat-trick for Palermo came on 25 March 2018 in a 4–0 victory over Carpi. His goals, the first of which was from the penalty spot, came in the 18th, 47th, and 76th minutes. The second goal was assisted by Andrea Rispoli, and the third came from Gabriele Rolando.

=== Al-Ittihad ===
After three years with Sharjah, Coronado joined Saudi Professional League club Al-Ittihad for a reported $12m fee in July 2021.

=== Corinthians ===
On 16 February 2024, Coronado was announced at Campeonato Brasileiro Série A side Corinthians on a two-year contract free transfer.

== Career statistics ==
As of match played 28 May 2025

Club	Season	League			State league (Note: Includes Campeonato Paulista)		National cup (Note: Includes Maltese FA Trophy, Coppa Italia, UAE President's Cup, King Cup, Copa do Brasil)		League cup (Note: Includes UAE League Cup)		Continental		Other		Total	
Club	Season	Division	Apps	Goals	Apps	Goals	Apps	Goals	Apps	Goals	Apps	Goals	Apps	Goals	Apps	Goals
Floriana	2012–13	Maltese Premier League	21	13	—		1	0	—		—		—		22	13
Floriana	2013–14	Maltese Premier League	31	14	—		1	0	—		—		—		32	14
Floriana	2014–15	Maltese Premier League	11	5	—		0	0	—		—		—		11	5
Floriana	Total		63	32	—		2	0	—		—		—		65	32
Trapani (loan)	2015–16	Serie B	41	8	—		1	0	—		—		—		42	8
Trapani	2016–17	Serie B	34	11	—		2	1	—		—		—		36	12
Palermo	2017–18	Serie B	29	6	—		1	0	—		—		—		30	6
Sharjah	2018–19	UAE Pro League	26	17	—		3	0	3	2	—		0	0	32	19
Sharjah	2019–20	UAE Pro League	11	7	—		2	0	5	3	4 (Note: Appearances in AFC Champions League)	2	1 (Note: Appearance in UAE Super Cup)	0	23	12
Sharjah	2020–21	UAE Pro League	25	17	—		3	2	0	0	3	0	1	0	32	19
Sharjah	Total		62	41	—		7	2	8	4	7	2	2	0	86	49
Al-Ittihad	2021–22	Saudi Pro League	19	5	—		2	0	—		—		1 (Note: Appearance in Arab Club Champions Cup)	0	22	5
Al-Ittihad	2022–23	Saudi Pro League	28	6	—		3	0	—		—		2 (Note: Appearances in Saudi Super Cup)	0	33	6
Al-Ittihad	2023–24	Saudi Pro League	15	5	—		0	0	—		—		5 (Note: Three appearances in Arab Club Champions Cup, two appearances in FIFA Club World Cup)	0	20	5
Al-Ittihad	Total		62	16	—		5	0	0	0	—		8	0	75	16
Corinthians	2024	Série A	30	1	1	0	6	0	—		8 (Note: Appearances in Copa Sudamericana)	3	—		45	4
Corinthians	2025	Série A	6	1	9	2	1	0	—		6 (Note: Appearances in Copa Libertadores)	0	—		22	3
Corinthians	Total		36	2	10	2	7	0	—		14	3	10	2	67	7
Career total			327	116	10	2	26	3	8	4	19	5	10	0	402	131

== Honours ==
Sharjah

- UAE Pro League: 2018–19
- UAE Super Cup: 2019, 2025
- Qatar-UAE Super Cup: 2026

Al-Ittihad

- Saudi Pro League: 2022–23
- Saudi Super Cup: 2022

Corinthians

- Campeonato Paulista: 2025
- Copa do Brasil: 2025

Individual

- Maltese Premier League Best Foreign Player: 2013
- Saudi Pro League Player of the Month: September 2021, March 2023
