= Ferchichi =

Ferchichi (Arabic: فرشيشي) is an Arabic language surname. Notable people with the surname include:

- Anis Mohamed Youssef Ferchichi (born 1978), German rapper, hip-hop producer, and entrepreneur
- Housem Ferchichi (born 1996), Italian footballer of Tunisian descent
