= 2018–19 UC Sampdoria season =

Sampdoria
2018–19 season
- President: Massimo Ferrero
- Manager: Marco Giampaolo
- Stadium: Stadio Luigi Ferraris
- Serie A: 9th
- Coppa Italia: Round of 16
- Top goalscorer: League: Fabio Quagliarella (26); All: Fabio Quagliarella (26)
- Highest home attendance: 30,548 vs Genoa (14 April 2019, Serie A)
- Lowest home attendance: 2,462 vs SPAL (4 December 2018, Coppa Italia)
- Average home league attendance: 20,264
Home colours	Away colours	Third colours

The 2018–19 season was Unione Calcio Sampdoria's 62nd season in Serie A, and their 7th consecutive season in the top-flight. The club competed in Serie A and in the Coppa Italia.

The season was the third in charge for coach Marco Giampaolo.

== Players ==
=== Squad information ===
As of 26 May 2019
Appearances include league matches only

No.	Name	Nat	Position(s)	Date of birth (Age at end of season)	Signed from	Signed in	Contract ends	Apps.	Goals	Notes
Goalkeepers
1	Emil Audero	(Italy)	GK	18 January 1997 (aged 22)	(Italy) Juventus	2018	2019	36	0	Loan
33	Rafael	(Brazil)	GK	20 May 1990 (aged 29)	(Italy) Napoli	2018	–	2	0	
72	Vid Belec	(Slovenia)	GK	6 June 1990 (aged 29)	(Italy) Benevento	2018	–	2	0	
Defenders
3	Joachim Andersen	(Denmark)	CB	31 May 1996 (aged 23)	(Netherlands) Twente	2017	2021	39	0	
7	Jacopo Sala	(Italy)	RB / CM	5 December 1991 (aged 27)	(Italy) Hellas Verona	2016	2020	59	0	
15	Omar Colley	(The Gambia)	CB	24 October 1992 (aged 26)	(Belgium) Genk	2018	2022	21	0	
22	Júnior Tavares	(Brazil)	LB	7 August 1996 (aged 22)	(Brazil) São Paulo	2018	2019	3	0	Loan
24	Bartosz Bereszyński	(Poland)	RB	12 July 1992 (aged 26)	(Poland) Legia Warsaw	2017	2023	71	0	
25	Alex Ferrari	(Italy)	CB	1 July 1994 (aged 24)	(Italy) Bologna	2018	2019	6	0	Loan
26	Lorenzo Tonelli	(Italy)	CB	17 January 1990 (aged 29)	(Italy) Napoli	2018	2019	19	1	Loan
29	Nicola Murru	(Italy)	LB	16 December 1994 (aged 24)	(Italy) Cagliari	2017	2022	55	0	
Midfielders
4	Ronaldo Vieira	(England)	CM	19 July 1998 (aged 20)	(England) Leeds United	2018	2023	14	0	
5	Riccardo Saponara	(Italy)	AM	21 December 1991 (aged 27)	(Italy) Fiorentina	2018	2019	22	2	Loan
6	Albin Ekdal	(Sweden)	CM	28 July 1989 (aged 29)	(Germany) Hamburger SV	2018	2021	32	0	
8	Édgar Barreto	(Paraguay)	CM	15 July 1984 (aged 34)	(Italy) Palermo	2015	2019	102	3	
10	Dennis Praet	(Belgium)	AM / CM	14 May 1994 (aged 25)	(Belgium) Anderlecht	2016	2021	98	4	
11	Gastón Ramírez	(Uruguay)	AM / LW / RW	2 December 1990 (aged 28)	(England) Middlesbrough	2017	2022	64	7	
14	Jakub Jankto	(Czech Republic)	CM / LM	19 June 1996 (aged 23)	(Italy) Udinese	2018	2019	25	0	Loan
16	Karol Linetty	(Poland)	CM	2 February 1995 (aged 24)	(Poland) Lech Poznań	2016	2021	96	7	
Forwards
17	Gianluca Caprari	(Italy)	SS / AM	30 July 1993 (aged 25)	(Italy) Internazionale	2017	2022	55	11	
20	Marco Sau	(Italy)	CF / LW / SS	3 November 1987 (aged 31)	(Italy) Cagliari	2019		5	0	Vice-captain
23	Manolo Gabbiadini	(Italy)	ST	26 November 1991 (aged 27)	(England) Southampton	2019	2023	18	4	
27	Fabio Quagliarella	(Italy)	ST	31 January 1983 (aged 36)	(Italy) Torino	2016	2019	160	73	Vice-captain
40	Ognjen Stijepović	(Montenegro)	LW / LM / SS	22 October 1999 (aged 19)	(Italy) Sampdoria Primavera	2018	–	1	0	
92	Grégoire Defrel	(France)	ST / SS / RW	17 June 1991 (aged 28)	(Italy) Roma	2018	2019	36	11	Loan
Players transferred during the season
18	Maxime Leverbe	(France)	CB	15 February 1997 (aged 22)	(Italy) Sampdoria Primavera	2017	–	0	0	
19	Vasco Regini	(Italy)	LB / CB	9 September 1990 (aged 28)	(Italy) Empoli	2013	2021	119	0	Captain
95	Gabriele Rolando	(Italy)	RB / RM / LB / LM	2 April 1995 (aged 24)	(Italy) Sampdoria Primavera	2014	2021	0	0	
99	Dawid Kownacki	(Poland)	ST	14 March 1997 (aged 22)	(Poland) Lech Poznań	2017	2022	35	6	

== Transfers ==
=== In ===
Date	Pos.	Player	Age	Moving from	Fee	Notes	Source
19 June 2018	GK	(Slovenia) Vid Belec	28	(Italy) Benevento	Undisclosed	Option to buy activated	
19 June 2018	DF	(The Gambia) Omar Colley	25	(Belgium) Genk	€10M		
1 July 2018	FW	(Italy) Federico Bonazzoli	21	(Italy) SPAL	Loan return		
1 July 2018	DF	(Croatia) Lorenco Šimić	21	(Italy) SPAL	Loan return		
1 July 2018	FW	(Colombia) Duván Zapata	27	(Italy) Napoli	€17M	Obligation to buy exercised	
11 January 2019	FW	(Italy) Manolo Gabbiadini	27	(England) Southampton	€12M		

==== Loans in ====
Date	Pos.	Player	Age	Moving from	Fee	Notes	Source
13 June 2018	DF	(Italy) Alex Ferrari	23	(Italy) Bologna	Loan		
6 July 2018	MF	(Czech Republic) Jakub Jankto	22	(Italy) Udinese	Loan	Loan with obligation to buy for €15M	
17 July 2018	GK	(Italy) Emil Audero	21	(Italy) Juventus	Loan	Loan with option to buy and counter-option	
27 July 2018	FW	(France) Grégoire Defrel	27	(Italy) Roma	Loan	Loan with an option to buy	
17 August 2018	MF	(Italy) Riccardo Saponara	26	(Italy) Fiorentina	Loan	Loan with an option to buy	
17 August 2018	DF	(Italy) Lorenzo Tonelli	28	(Italy) Napoli	€500,000	Loan with an option to buy	

=== Out ===
Date	Pos.	Player	Age	Moving to	Fee	Notes	Source
22 June 2018	MF	(Serbia) Filip Đuričić	26	(Italy) Sassuolo	Free		
22 June 2018	GK	(Italy) Emiliano Viviano	32	(Portugal) Sporting CP	€2M		
1 July 2018	DF	(Italy) Gian Marco Ferrari	26	(Italy) Sassuolo	Loan return		
2 July 2018	DF	(Croatia) Ivan Strinić	30	(Italy) Milan	Free	End of contract	
10 July 2018	MF	(Uruguay) Lucas Torreira	22	(England) Arsenal	€30M		
11 July 2018	MF	(Argentina) Ricky Álvarez	30	Unattached	Free	Contract terminated by mutual consent	
6 August 2018	DF	(Argentina) Matías Silvestre	33	(Italy) Empoli	Undisclosed		

==== Loans out ====
Date	Pos.	Player	Age	Moving to	Fee	Notes	Source
12 July 2018	FW	(Colombia) Duván Zapata	27	(Italy) Atalanta	€14M	2-year loan with €12M option to buy	
3 August 2018	MF	(Italy) Leonardo Capezzi	23	(Italy) Empoli	Loan	Loan with an option to buy and counter-option	
3 August 2018	GK	(Italy) Andrea Tozzo	25	(Italy) Hellas Verona	Loan	Loan with an option to buy	
16 August 2018	DF	(Croatia) Lorenco Šimić	25	(Italy) SPAL	Loan	Loan with an option to buy and counter-option	
17 August 2018	MF	(Slovakia) Dávid Ivan	23	(Italy) Vis Pesaro	Loan		
17 August 2018	MF	(Italy) Valerio Verre	24	(Italy) Perugia	Loan	Loan with an option to buy	
23 August 2018	GK	(Italy) Wladimiro Falcone	23	(Italy) Lucchese	Loan		

== Competitions ==
=== Serie A ===
==== League table ====
Pos	Team	Pld	W	D	L	GF	GA	GD	Pts	Qualification or relegation
7	Torino	38	16	15	7	52	37	+15	63	Qualification for the Europa League second qualifying round
8	Lazio	38	17	8	13	56	46	+10	57 (Note: Lazio were deducted 2 points by the Italian Football Federation.)	Qualification for the Europa League group stage (Note: Lazio qualified for the Europa League group stage by winning the 2018–19 Coppa Italia)
9	Sampdoria	38	15	8	15	60	51	+9	53	
10	Bologna	38	11	11	16	48	56	−8	44	
11	Sassuolo	38	9	16	13	53	60	−7	43	

Source: Serie A, Soccerway
Rules for classification: 1) Points; 2) Head-to-head points; 3) Head-to-head goal difference; 4) Goal difference; 5) Goals scored; 6) Draw. (Note: Head-to-head record is used only after all the matches between the teams in question have been played).

==== Results summary ====
Overall								Home						Away					
Pld	W	D	L	GF	GA	GD	Pts	W	D	L	GF	GA	GD	W	D	L	GF	GA	GD
38	15	8	15	60	51	+9	53	10	2	7	28	16	+12	5	6	8	32	35	−3

Last updated: 26 May 2019.
Source: Competitive matches

==== Results by round ====
Round	1	2	3	4	5	6	7	8	9	10	11	12	13	14	15	16	17	18	19	20	21	22	23	24	25	26	27	28	29	30	31	32	33	34	35	36	37	38
Ground	H	A	H	A	H	A	H	A	H	A	H	A	A	H	A	H	A	H	A	A	H	A	H	A	H	A	H	A	H	A	H	H	A	H	A	H	A	H
Result	D	L	W	W	L	D	W	W	D	L	L	L	D	W	D	W	W	W	L	D	W	L	L	L	W	W	L	W	W	L	L	W	L	L	D	L	D	W
Position	13	18	13	4	9	9	8	5	5	7	11	12	12	10	11	9	6	5	7	8	6	8	10	10	10	9	9	9	9	9	9	9	9	9	9	9	9	9

Updated to match(es) played on 26 May 2019. Source: Competitive matches
A = Away; H = Home; W = Win; D = Draw; L = Loss

==== Matches ====
26 August 2018 2	Udinese	1–0	Sampdoria	Udine
20:30 CEST (UTC+02:00)	De Paul 9'; Nuytinck (yellow card) 86'	Report	Bereszyński (yellow card) 26'; Ramírez (yellow card) 57'; Murru (yellow card) 67'	Stadium: Dacia Arena; Attendance: 15,770; Referee: Federico La Penna

2 September 2018 3	Sampdoria	3–0	Napoli	Genoa
20:30 CEST (UTC+02:00)	Defrel 11', 32'; Ramírez (yellow card) 40'; Quagliarella 75'; Vieira (yellow card) 88'	Report	Diawara (yellow card) 68'; Mário Rui (yellow card) 77'; Allan (yellow card) 81'; Rog (yellow card) 83'	Stadium: Stadio Luigi Ferraris; Attendance: 19,835; Referee: Davide Massa

15 September 2018 4	Frosinone	0–5	Sampdoria	Frosinone
20:30 CEST (UTC+02:00)	Maiello (yellow card) 17'; Brighenti (yellow card) 34'; Soddimo (yellow card) 63'	Report	Quagliarella 10'; Defrel (yellow card) 22', (goal) 54', 86'; Caprari 47'; Kownacki 83' (pen.)	Stadium: Stadio Benito Stirpe; Attendance: 12,502; Referee: Massimiliano Irrati

19 September 2018 1	Sampdoria	1–1	Fiorentina	Genoa
17:00 CEST (UTC+02:00)	Sala (yellow card) 38'; Linetty (yellow card) 51'; Caprari 60'; Tonelli (yellow card) 85'	Report	Simeone 13'; Veretout (yellow card) 72'; Benassi (yellow card) 79'	Stadium: Stadio Luigi Ferraris; Attendance: 18,334; Referee: Fabio Maresca
Note: Match was postponed from its original date of 19 August due to the collapse of the Ponte Morandi bridge in Genoa, which resulted in the deaths of 39 people.

22 September 2018 5	Sampdoria	0–1	Internazionale	Genoa
20:30 CEST (UTC+02:00)	Linetty (yellow card) 6'; Defrel (yellow card) 90'; Tonelli (yellow card) 90+5'	Report	Miranda (yellow card) 20'; Valero (yellow card) 90+1'; Brozović 90+4'	Stadium: Stadio Luigi Ferraris; Attendance: 22,835; Referee: Marco Guida

26 September 2018 6	Cagliari	0–0	Sampdoria	Cagliari
21:00 CEST (UTC+02:00)	Cigarini (yellow card) 22'	Report	Bereszyński (yellow card) 30'; Ramírez (yellow card) 59'; Praet (yellow card) 76'	Stadium: Sardegna Arena; Attendance: 14,038; Referee: Gianluca Rocchi

1 October 2018 7	Sampdoria	2–1	SPAL	Genoa
20:30 CEST (UTC+02:00)	Linetty 25'; Ekdal (yellow card) 40'; Murru (yellow card) 49'; Defrel 60'; Praet (yellow card) 70'	Report	Paloschi 21'; Felipe (yellow card) 37'; Everton Luiz (yellow card) 40'; Petagna (yellow card) 90'	Stadium: Stadio Luigi Ferraris; Attendance: 17,885; Referee: Federico La Penna

7 October 2018 8	Atalanta	0–1	Sampdoria	Bergamo
15:00 CEST (UTC+02:00)	De Roon (yellow card) 46'; Iličić (yellow card) 89'	Report	Andersen (yellow card) 31'; Praet (yellow card) 50'; Tonelli 76'; Linetty (yellow card) 78'; Bereszyński (yellow card) 90+1'	Stadium: Stadio Atleti Azzurri d'Italia; Attendance: 19,164; Referee: Massimiliano Irrati

22 October 2018 9	Sampdoria	0–0	Sassuolo	Genoa
20:30 CEST (UTC+02:00)	Andersen (yellow card) 20'; Barreto (yellow card) 54'	Report	Marlon (yellow card) 5'; Di Francesco (yellow card) 32'; Berardi (yellow card) 62'	Stadium: Stadio Luigi Ferraris; Attendance: 19,064; Referee: Francesco Fourneau

28 October 2018 10	Milan	3–2	Sampdoria	Milan
18:00 CET (UTC+01:00)	Cutrone 17'; Higuaín 36'; Suso 62'; Abate (yellow card) 80'; Kessié (yellow card) 82'; Romagnoli (yellow card) 90+3'	Report	Saponara 21'; Linetty (yellow card) 24'; Quagliarella 31'; Sala (yellow card) 60'	Stadium: San Siro; Attendance: 47,347; Referee: Fabio Maresca

4 November 2018 11	Sampdoria	1–4	Torino	Genoa
15:00 CET (UTC+01:00)	Praet (yellow card) 11'; Ekdal (yellow card) 40'; Quagliarella 65'	Report	Belotti 12', 43' (pen.); Rincón (yellow card) 32'; Meïté (yellow card) 51'; Falque 56'; Izzo 78'	Stadium: Stadio Luigi Ferraris; Attendance: 20,364; Referee: Gianluca Rocchi

11 November 2018 12	Roma	4–1	Sampdoria	Rome
15:00 CET (UTC+01:00)	Juan Jesus 19'; Florenzi (yellow card) 40'; Schick 59'; El Shaarawy 72', 90+3'	Report	Linetty (yellow card) 18'; Defrel 89'	Stadium: Stadio Olimpico; Attendance: 37,582; Referee: Massimiliano Irrati

25 November 2018 13	Genoa	1–1	Sampdoria	Genoa
20:30 CET (UTC+01:00)	Piątek 17' (pen.); Criscito (yellow card) 73'; Sandro (yellow card) 85'	Report	Quagliarella 8'; Audero (yellow card) 17'	Stadium: Stadio Luigi Ferraris; Attendance: 33,727; Referee: Daniele Doveri

1 December 2018 14	Sampdoria	4–1	Bologna	Genoa
20:30 CET (UTC+01:00)	Praet 10'; Quagliarella 25', 68'; Ramírez 41'; Tonelli (yellow card) 55'; Linetty (yellow card) 78'; Bereszyński (yellow card) 88'	Report	Poli 17'; Calabresi (yellow card) 53'; Santander (yellow card) 67'; Palacio (yellow card) 69'	Stadium: Stadio Luigi Ferraris; Attendance: 17,844; Referee: Rosario Abisso

8 December 2018 15	Lazio	2–2	Sampdoria	Rome
20:30 CET (UTC+01:00)	Caicedo (yellow card) 6'; Immobile (yellow card) 45', (goal) 90+6' (pen.); Wallace (yellow card) 69'; Acerbi 79'	Report	Quagliarella 21'; Bereszyński (yellow card) 40' (yellow-red card) 90+2'; Audero (yellow card) 57'; Linetty (yellow card) 90'; Andersen (yellow card) 90+5'; Saponara 90+9', (yellow card) 90+9'	Stadium: Stadio Olimpico; Attendance: 28,000; Referee: Davide Massa

16 December 2018 16	Sampdoria	2–0	Parma	Genoa
15:00 CET (UTC+01:00)	Murru (yellow card) 43'; Caprari 66'; Quagliarella 69'; Linetty (yellow card) 88'	Report	Scozzarella (yellow card) 61'	Stadium: Stadio Luigi Ferraris; Attendance: 19,000; Referee: Luca Pairetto

22 December 2018 17	Empoli	2–4	Sampdoria	Empoli
15:00 CET (UTC+01:00)	Pasqual 11' (pen.); Acquah (yellow card) 33'; Caputo (yellow card) 34', (goal) 75'; La Gumina (yellow card) 85'	Report	Andersen (yellow card) 18'; Ramírez 41'; Quagliarella 69', (yellow card) 71'; Ekdal (yellow card) 82'; Caprari 87', 90+1', (yellow card) 88'	Stadium: Stadio Carlo Castellani; Attendance: 8,815; Referee: Gianpaolo Calvarese

26 December 2018 18	Sampdoria	2–0	Chievo	Genoa
15:00 CET (UTC+01:00)	Quagliarella 47'; Andersen (yellow card) 56'; Ramírez 59', (yellow card) 84'	Report	Cesar (yellow card) 74'	Stadium: Stadio Luigi Ferraris; Attendance: 19,190; Referee: Antonio Giua

29 December 2018 19	Juventus	2–1	Sampdoria	Turin
12:30 CET (UTC+01:00)	Ronaldo 2', 65' (pen.); Matuidi (yellow card) 36'; Rugani (yellow card) 71'	Report	Quagliarella 33' (pen.); Ferrari (yellow card) 37'; Saponara (yellow card) 90+3'	Stadium: Allianz Stadium; Attendance: 40,641; Referee: Paolo Valeri

20 January 2019 20	Fiorentina	3–3	Sampdoria	Florence
15:00 CET (UTC+01:00)	Fernandes (yellow card) 14' (yellow-red card) 39'; Milenković (yellow card) 34'; Muriel 34', 70'; Hugo (yellow card) 80'; Biraghi (yellow card) 82'; Veretout (yellow card) 90+2'; Pezzella 90+3'	Report	Ramírez (yellow card) 22', (goal) 44'; Jankto (yellow card) 60'; Quagliarella 81' (pen.), 85'; Ekdal (yellow card) 82'; Murru (yellow card) 90+2'	Stadium: Stadio Artemio Franchi; Attendance: 27,844; Referee: Marco Di Bello

26 January 2019 21	Sampdoria	4–0	Udinese	Genoa
18:00 CET (UTC+01:00)	Quagliarella 33' (pen.), 56' (pen.); Praet (yellow card) 37'; Audero (yellow card) 59'; Linetty 68'; Gabbiadini 78'	Report	Nuytinck (yellow card) 53'; Opoku (yellow card) 55'; Okaka (yellow card) 61'; Mandragora (yellow card) 70'	Stadium: Stadio Luigi Ferraris; Attendance: 18,020; Referee: Davide Massa

2 February 2019 22	Napoli	3–0	Sampdoria	Naples
18:00 CET (UTC+01:00)	Milik 25'; Insigne 26'; Verdi 89' (pen.)	Report	Jankto (yellow card) 73'; Murru (yellow card) 76'; Andersen (yellow card) 87'	Stadium: Stadio San Paolo; Attendance: 19,455; Referee: Luca Pairetto

10 February 2019 23	Sampdoria	0–1	Frosinone	Genoa
15:00 CET (UTC+01:00)	Tavares (yellow card) 35'; Gabbiadini (yellow card) 55'; Linetty (yellow card) 77'	Report	Ciofani 25'; Cassata (yellow card) 30'; Ciano (yellow card) 45'; Sportiello (yellow card) 90'	Stadium: Stadio Luigi Ferraris; Attendance: 18,937; Referee: Livio Marinelli

17 February 2019 24	Internazionale	2–1	Sampdoria	Milan
18:00 CET (UTC+01:00)	D'Ambrosio (yellow card) 17', (goal) 73'; Perišić (yellow card) 24'; Škriniar (yellow card) 31'; Nainggolan 78'	Report	Linetty (yellow card) 28'; Gabbiadini 76'	Stadium: San Siro; Attendance: 55,127; Referee: Daniele Doveri

24 February 2019 25	Sampdoria	1–0	Cagliari	Genoa
12:30 CET (UTC+01:00)	Ekdal (yellow card) 18'; Quagliarella 68' (pen.)	Report	Deiola (yellow card) 33'; Pellegrini (yellow card) 64'	Stadium: Stadio Luigi Ferraris; Attendance: 18,840; Referee: Luca Massimi

3 March 2019 26	SPAL	1–2	Sampdoria	Ferrara
15:00 CET (UTC+01:00)	Fares (yellow card) 71'; Valoti (yellow card) 76'; Kurtić 90+4'; Cionek (red card) 90+7'	Report	Quagliarella 4', 11'; Vieira (yellow card) 73'; Sala (yellow card) 76'; Audero (yellow card) 90+1'	Stadium: Stadio Paolo Mazza; Attendance: 12,731; Referee: Fabrizio Pasqua

10 March 2019 27	Sampdoria	1–2	Atalanta	Genoa
15:00 CET (UTC+01:00)	Murru (yellow card) 53'; Quagliarella 67' (pen.); Ramírez (yellow card) 90+3'	Report	Zapata 50', (yellow card) 90+5'; Gosens 77'; Freuler (yellow card) 90+6'	Stadium: Stadio Luigi Ferraris; Attendance: 20,896; Referee: Michael Fabbri

16 March 2019 28	Sassuolo	3–5	Sampdoria	Reggio Emilia
15:00 CET (UTC+01:00)	Boga 38'; Duncan (yellow card) 45+5', (goal) 63'; Babacar 90+2'	Report	Defrel 15'; Quagliarella 36'; Linetty 39'; Praet 46'; Gabbiadini (yellow card) 48', (goal) 72'	Stadium: Mapei Stadium – Città del Tricolore; Attendance: 11,193; Referee: Federico Dionisi

30 March 2019 29	Sampdoria	1–0	Milan	Genoa
20:30 CET (UTC+01:00)	Defrel 1'; Vieira (yellow card) 37'; Praet (yellow card) 86'	Report	Suso (yellow card) 15'; Castillejo (yellow card) 25'; Bakayoko (yellow card) 65'; Musacchio (yellow card) 90+1'	Stadium: Stadio Luigi Ferraris; Attendance: 23,475; Referee: Daniele Orsato

3 April 2019 30	Torino	2–1	Sampdoria	Turin
21:00 CEST (UTC+02:00)	Belotti 34', 45+1'; De Silvestri (yellow card) 61'; Rincón (yellow card) 86'; Lukić (yellow card) 90'	Report	Bereszyński (yellow card) 57'; Murru (yellow card) 76'; Gabbiadini 83', (yellow card) 90+1'	Stadium: Stadio Olimpico Grande Torino; Attendance: 22,618; Referee: Fabio Maresca

6 April 2019 31	Sampdoria	0–1	Roma	Genoa
20:30 CEST (UTC+02:00)	Saponara (yellow card) 38'; Gabbiadini (yellow card) 88'	Report	Schick (yellow card) 42'; Kolarov (yellow card) 43'; De Rossi 75'	Stadium: Stadio Luigi Ferraris; Attendance: 19,594; Referee: Paolo Mazzoleni

14 April 2019 32	Sampdoria	2–0	Genoa	Genoa
15:00 CEST (UTC+02:00)	Defrel 3'; Linetty (yellow card) 30'; Quagliarella 53' (pen.); Gabbiadini (yellow card) 90+1'	Report	Criscito (yellow card) 8'; Biraschi (red card) 51'; Pandev (yellow card) 60'; Romero (yellow card) 66'; Veloso (yellow card) 79'; Lerager (yellow card) 88'	Stadium: Stadio Luigi Ferraris; Attendance: 30,548; Referee: Gianpaolo Calvarese

20 April 2019 33	Bologna	3–0	Sampdoria	Bologna
15:00 CEST (UTC+02:00)	Soriano (yellow card) 52'; Tonelli 54' (o.g.); Orsolini (yellow card) 58', (goal) 83'; Pulgar 69'	Report	Murru (yellow card) 41'; Sala (yellow card) 48'; Andersen (yellow card) 53'; Tonelli (yellow card) 68'	Stadium: Stadio Renato Dall'Ara; Attendance: 21,391; Referee: Maurizio Mariani

28 April 2019 34	Sampdoria	1–2	Lazio	Genoa
18:00 CEST (UTC+02:00)	Ferrari (yellow card) 22'; Ramírez (yellow card) 23' (yellow-red card) 45'; Quagliarella 57'; Tonelli (yellow card) 74'; Murru (yellow card) 90'; Sala (yellow card) 90+4'	Report	Caicedo 3', 19'; Acerbi (yellow card) 32'; Wallace (yellow card) 71'; Lulić (yellow card) 90+2'	Stadium: Stadio Luigi Ferraris; Attendance: 18,450; Referee: Fabio Maresca

5 May 2019 35	Parma	3–3	Sampdoria	Parma
15:00 CEST (UTC+02:00)	Gazzola 2'; Barillà (yellow card) 23'; Dimarco (yellow card) 27'; Kucka (yellow card) 60' (yellow-red card) 90+1', (goal) 67' (pen.); Bastoni 71'	Report	Colley (yellow card) 4' (yellow-red card) 88'; Quagliarella 28' (pen.), 61'; Defrel 38'; Barreto (yellow card) 80'	Stadium: Stadio Ennio Tardini; Attendance: 16,992; Referee: Michael Fabbri

12 May 2019 36	Sampdoria	1–2	Empoli	Genoa
15:00 CEST (UTC+02:00)	Ekdal (yellow card) 30'; Tonelli (yellow card) 74'; Quagliarella 90+2' (pen.)	Report	Di Lorenzo (yellow card) 17', (goal) 75'; Farias 56'	Stadium: Stadio Luigi Ferraris; Attendance: 19,034; Referee: Daniele Doveri

19 May 2019 37	Chievo	0–0	Sampdoria	Verona
12:30 CEST (UTC+02:00)	Stępiński (yellow card) 32'; Barba (red card) 40'; Hetemaj (yellow card) 70'; Pucciarelli (yellow card) 85'	Report		Stadium: Stadio Marc'Antonio Bentegodi; Attendance: 10,600; Referee: Gianluca Aureliano

26 May 2019 38	Sampdoria	2–0	Juventus	Genoa
18:00 CEST (UTC+02:00)	Defrel 84'; Caprari 90+1'	Report	Rugani (yellow card) 52'; Portanova (yellow card) 90+3'	Stadium: Stadio Luigi Ferraris; Attendance: 22,856; Referee: Luigi Nasca

=== Coppa Italia ===
12 August 2018 Third round	Sampdoria	1–0	Viterbese Castrense	Genoa
20:30 CEST (UTC+02:00)	Jankto 75'; Murru (yellow card) 90+4'		Zerbin (yellow card) 32'	Stadium: Stadio Luigi Ferraris; Attendance: 9,000; Referee: Gianluca Aureliano

4 December 2018 Fourth round	Sampdoria	2–1	SPAL	Genoa
20:45 CET (UTC+01:00)	Defrel 45+1'; Kownacki 82'	Report	Floccari 34'; Cionek (yellow card) 56'; Viviani (yellow card) 88'	Stadium: Stadio Luigi Ferraris; Attendance: 2,462; Referee: Aleandro Di Paolo

12 January 2019 Round of 16	Sampdoria	0–2 (a.e.t.)	Milan	Genoa
18:00 CET (UTC+01:00)	Ramírez (yellow card) 24'; Praet (yellow card) 68'	Report	Rodríguez (yellow card) 32'; Kessié (yellow card) 57'; Cutrone 102', 108'	Stadium: Stadio Luigi Ferraris; Attendance: 14,854; Referee: Fabrizio Pasqua

== Statistics ==
=== Appearances and goals ===
No.	Pos	Nat	Player	Total		Serie A		Coppa Italia	
No.	Pos	Nat	Player	Apps	Goals	Apps	Goals	Apps	Goals
Goalkeepers
1	GK	(Italy) ITA	Emil Audero	37	0	36	0	1	0
33	GK	(Brazil) BRA	Rafael	4	0	2	0	2	0
72	GK	(Slovenia) SVN	Vid Belec	0	0	0	0	0	0
Defenders
3	DF	(Denmark) DEN	Joachim Andersen	34	0	32	0	2	0
7	DF	(Italy) ITA	Jacopo Sala	24	0	16+5	0	3	0
15	DF	(The Gambia) GAM	Omar Colley	23	0	21	0	2	0
22	DF	(Brazil) BRA	Júnior Tavares	3	0	2+1	0	0	0
24	DF	(Poland) POL	Bartosz Bereszyński	28	0	24+3	0	1	0
25	DF	(Italy) ITA	Alex Ferrari	7	0	6	0	1	0
26	DF	(Italy) ITA	Lorenzo Tonelli	20	1	17+2	1	1	0
29	DF	(Italy) ITA	Nicola Murru	37	0	34+1	0	2	0
Midfielders
4	MF	(England) ENG	Ronaldo Vieira	15	0	6+8	0	1	0
5	MF	(Italy) ITA	Riccardo Saponara	24	2	11+11	2	1+1	0
6	MF	(Sweden) SWE	Albin Ekdal	33	0	30+2	0	1	0
8	MF	(Paraguay) PAR	Édgar Barreto	13	0	9+3	0	1	0
10	MF	(Belgium) BEL	Dennis Praet	37	2	33+1	2	3	0
11	MF	(Uruguay) URU	Gastón Ramírez	29	4	19+8	4	2	0
14	MF	(Czech Republic) CZE	Jakub Jankto	28	1	7+18	0	1+2	1
16	MF	(Poland) POL	Karol Linetty	35	3	30+2	3	2+1	0
40	MF	(Montenegro) MNE	Ognjen Stijepović	0	0	0	0	0	0
Forwards
17	FW	(Italy) ITA	Gianluca Caprari	24	6	12+9	6	1+2	0
20	FW	(Italy) ITA	Marco Sau	5	0	0+5	0	0	0
23	FW	(Italy) ITA	Manolo Gabbiadini	18	4	8+10	4	0	0
27	FW	(Italy) ITA	Fabio Quagliarella	39	26	37	26	1+1	0
92	FW	(France) FRA	Grégoire Defrel	39	12	26+10	11	2+1	1
Players transferred out during the season
18	DF	(France) FRA	Maxime Leverbe	0	0	0	0	0	0
19	DF	(Italy) ITA	Vasco Regini	0	0	0	0	0	0
95	DF	(Italy) ITA	Gabriele Rolando	1	0	0	0	0+1	0
99	FW	(Poland) POL	Dawid Kownacki	16	2	0+13	1	2+1	1

Last updated: 26 May 2019
Source: Competitions

=== Goalscorers ===
Rank	No.	Pos	Nat	Name	Serie A	Coppa Italia	Total
1	27	FW	(Italy)	Fabio Quagliarella	26	0	26
2	92	FW	(France)	Grégoire Defrel	11	1	12
3	17	FW	(Italy)	Gianluca Caprari	6	0	6
4	11	MF	(Uruguay)	Gastón Ramírez	4	0	4
4	23	FW	(Italy)	Manolo Gabbiadini	4	0	4
6	16	MF	(Poland)	Karol Linetty	3	0	3
7	5	MF	(Italy)	Riccardo Saponara	2	0	2
7	10	MF	(Belgium)	Dennis Praet	2	0	2
7	99	FW	(Poland)	Dawid Kownacki	1	1	2
10	14	MF	(Czech Republic)	Jakub Jankto	0	1	1
10	26	DF	(Italy)	Lorenzo Tonelli	1	0	1
Own goal					0	0	0
Totals					60	3	63

Last updated: 26 May 2019

=== Clean sheets ===
Rank	No.	Pos	Nat	Name	Serie A	Coppa Italia	Total
1	1	GK	(Italy)	Emil Audero	11	1	12
2	33	GK	(Brazil)	Rafael	2	0	2
Totals					13	1	14

Last updated: 26 May 2019

=== Disciplinary record ===
No.	Pos	Nat	Name	Serie A			Coppa Italia			Total		
No.	Pos	Nat	Name	Booked	(yellow card) (yellow-red card)	Sent off (straight red)	Booked	(yellow card) (yellow-red card)	Sent off (straight red)	Booked	(yellow card) (yellow-red card)	Sent off (straight red)
1	GK	(Italy)	Emil Audero	4	0	0	0	0	0	4	0	0
3	DF	(Denmark)	Joachim Andersen	7	0	0	0	0	0	7	0	0
7	DF	(Italy)	Jacopo Sala	5	0	0	0	0	0	5	0	0
15	DF	(The Gambia)	Omar Colley	1	0	0	0	0	0	1	0	0
22	DF	(Brazil)	Júnior Tavares	1	0	0	0	0	0	1	0	0
24	DF	(Poland)	Bartosz Bereszyński	5	1	0	0	0	0	5	1	0
25	DF	(Italy)	Alex Ferrari	2	0	0	0	0	0	2	0	0
26	DF	(Italy)	Lorenzo Tonelli	6	0	0	0	0	0	6	0	0
29	DF	(Italy)	Nicola Murru	9	0	0	1	0	0	10	0	0
4	MF	(England)	Ronaldo Vieira	3	0	0	0	0	0	3	0	0
5	MF	(Italy)	Riccardo Saponara	3	0	0	0	0	0	3	0	0
6	MF	(Sweden)	Albin Ekdal	6	0	0	0	0	0	6	0	0
8	MF	(Paraguay)	Édgar Barreto	2	0	0	0	0	0	2	0	0
10	MF	(Belgium)	Dennis Praet	6	0	0	1	0	0	7	0	0
11	MF	(Uruguay)	Gastón Ramírez	6	1	0	1	0	0	7	1	0
14	MF	(Czech Republic)	Jakub Jankto	2	0	0	0	0	0	2	0	0
16	MF	(Poland)	Karol Linetty	11	0	0	0	0	0	11	0	0
17	FW	(Italy)	Gianluca Caprari	1	0	0	0	0	0	1	0	0
23	FW	(Italy)	Manolo Gabbiadini	5	0	0	0	0	0	5	0	0
27	FW	(Italy)	Fabio Quagliarella	1	0	0	0	0	0	1	0	0
92	FW	(France)	Grégoire Defrel	2	0	0	0	0	0	2	0	0
Totals				87	3	0	3	0	0	90	3	0

Last updated: 26 May 2019
