= Salvatore Pezzella =

Italian footballer

Personal information
- Date of birth: 11 March 2000 (age 26)
- Place of birth: Rome, Italy
- Height: 1.78 m (5 ft 10 in)
- Position: Midfielder

Team information
- Current team: Casertana
- Number: 16

Youth career
- Roma

Senior career*
| Years | Team | Apps | (Gls) |
| 2018–2022 | Roma | 0 | (0) |
| 2019–2020 | → Modena (loan) | 24 | (2) |
| 2020–2021 | → Reggiana (loan) | 22 | (0) |
| 2021–2022 | → Siena (loan) | 28 | (1) |
| 2022–2023 | Triestina | 20 | (2) |
| 2023–2025 | Avellino | 11 | (0) |
| 2024–2025 | → Cavese (loan) | 30 | (1) |
| 2025– | Casertana | 37 | (2) |

International career^{‡}
| 2016 | Italy U16 | 3 | (0) |
| 2017 | Italy U17 | 1 | (0) |
| 2018 | Italy U18 | 1 | (0) |
- * Club domestic league appearances and goals as of 1 May 2026 ‡ National team caps and goals as of 18 April 2018

Salvatore Pezzella (born 11 March 2000) is an Italian professional footballer who plays as a midfielder for Serie C Group C club Casertana.

== Club career ==
=== Roma ===
He is a product of Roma youth teams and started playing for their Under-19 squad in the 2017–18 season.

He appeared for the senior squad in the summer 2017 and summer 2018 pre-season friendlies. In March 2019, he was called up to the senior squad for a Serie A game, but remained on the bench.

==== Loan to Modena ====
On 17 July 2019, Pezzella joined newly-promoted Serie C club Modena on loan. He made his professional Serie C debut for Modena on 25 August as a substitute replacing Gianluca Laurenti in the 61st minute of a 0–0 home draw Vicenza Virtus. He made his first starting-lineup appearance one month later, on 25 September, against Sambenedettese, he was replaced by Andrea Ingegneri after 58 minutes. On 21 October he played his first entire match for the club and he also scored his first professional goal in the 48th minute of a 1–1 home draw against Fermana. On 1 December he scored his second goal for the club in the 48th minute of a 3–1 home win over Vis Pesaro. Pezzella ended his season-long loan to Modena with 24 appearances, 2 goals and 1 assist.

==== Loan to Reggiana ====
On 24 August 2020, Pezzella was loaned to newly-promoted Serie B club Reggiana on a season-long loan deal.

==== Loan to Siena ====
On 28 August 2021, Pezzella was sent on a season-long loan to Siena.

=== Triestina ===
On 19 July 2022, Pezzella joined Triestina on a two-year contract.

=== Avellino ===
On 12 August 2023, Pezzella signed a three-year contract with Avellino. On 30 July 2024, Pezzella was loaned by Cavese.

=== Casertana ===
On 22 July 2025, Pezzella moved to Casertana on a three-year deal.

== International career ==
He was first called up to represent his country for the Under-16 squad friendlies in 2016.

He later appeared in friendlies on the Under-17 and Under-18 levels.

== Career statistics ==
=== Club ===
As of match played 3 April 2022

| Club | Season | League | | | Cup | | Europe | | Other | | Total | |
| Club | Season | League | Apps | Goals | Apps | Goals | Apps | Goals | Apps | Goals | Apps | Goals |
|---|---|---|---|---|---|---|---|---|---|---|---|---|
| Modena (loan) | 2019–20 | Serie C | 24 | 2 | — | | — | | — | | 24 | 2 |
| Reggiana (loan) | 2020–21 | Serie B | 22 | 0 | 1 | 0 | — | | — | | 23 | 0 |
| Modena (loan) | 2021–22 | Serie C | 25 | 1 | — | | — | | — | | 25 | 1 |
| Career total | | | 71 | 3 | 1 | 0 | — | | — | | 72 | 3 |

== Honours ==
=== Club ===
Roma Primavera

- Coppa Italia Primavera: 2016-17
- Supercoppa Primavera: 2017
