= Paweł Dawidowicz =

Polish footballer (born 1995)

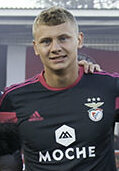
- Dawidowicz with Benfica B in 2015

Personal information
- Full name: Paweł Marek Dawidowicz
- Date of birth: 20 May 1995 (age 31)
- Place of birth: Olsztyn, Poland
- Height: 1.89 m (6 ft 2 in)
- Positions: Defender; defensive midfielder

Team information
- Current team: Hellas Verona

Youth career
- 2011: Sokół Ostróda
- 2011–2014: Lechia Gdańsk

Senior career*
Years	Team	Apps	(Gls)
2012–2013	Lechia Gdańsk II	15	(0)
2012–2014	Lechia Gdańsk	34	(1)
2014–2019	Benfica B	66	(3)
2016–2017	→ VFL Bochum (loan)	17	(0)
2017–2018	→ Palermo (loan)	27	(0)
2018–2019	→ Hellas Verona (loan)	28	(1)
2019–2025	Hellas Verona	139	(2)
2026	Raków Częstochowa	10	(0)
2026–	Hellas Verona	0	(0)

International career
2013	Poland U18	4	(0)
2013	Poland U19	3	(0)
2014–2015	Poland U20	4	(0)
2014–2017	Poland U21	11	(0)
2015–2024	Poland	17	(0)
- * Club domestic league appearances and goals as of 19:10, 29 May 2026 (UTC)

Paweł Marek Dawidowicz (born 20 May 1995) is a Polish professional footballer who plays as a defender or a defensive midfielder for Serie B club Hellas Verona. Besides Poland, he has played in Portugal, Germany, and Italy.

== Club career ==
Dawidowicz played for Lechia Gdańsk's senior team for two years. On 20 May 2014, he signed a five-year-contract for Portuguese champions Benfica, being assigned to the reserve team. On 15 March 2015, Dawidowicz scored his first goal for Benfica B in a 3–0 away win at Farense in Segunda Liga.

On 20 March 2019, Dawidowicz signed a permanent deal with Italian side Verona after joining the club on loan for the 2018–19 season. Prior to that, from 2016 to 2018, he had been loaned out to VfL Bochum in Germany and Palermo in Italy for one season each.

== International career ==
Dawidowicz made his senior international debut for Poland as a substitute in a 3–1 friendly victory against the Czech Republic in Wrocław on 17 November 2015, replacing Michał Pazdan for the final minutes.

Dawidowicz was named in Poland's preliminary 35-man squad for the 2018 World Cup in Russia. However, he did not make the final 23.

== Career statistics ==
=== Club ===
As of match played 23 May 2026

Appearances and goals by club, season and competition
Club	Season	League			National cup (Note: Includes Polish Cup, Coppa Italia)		Europe		Other		Total	
Club	Season	Division	Apps	Goals	Apps	Goals	Apps	Goals	Apps	Goals	Apps	Goals
Lechia Gdańsk II	2012–13	III liga, gr. D	15	0	—		—		—		15	0
Lechia Gdańsk	2012–13	Ekstraklasa	2	0	0	0	—		—		2	0
Lechia Gdańsk	2013–14	Ekstraklasa	32	1	2	0	—		—		34	1
Lechia Gdańsk	Total		34	1	2	0	—		—		36	1
Benfica B	2014–15	LigaPro	29	1	—		—		—		29	1
Benfica B	2015–16	LigaPro	37	2	—		—		—		37	2
Benfica B	Total		66	3	—		—		—		66	3
VfL Bochum (loan)	2016–17	2. Bundesliga	17	0	0	0	—		—		17	0
Palermo (loan)	2017–18	Serie B	27	0	0	0	—		2 (Note: Appearances in Serie B promotion play-offs)	0	29	0
Hellas Verona (loan)	2018–19	Serie B	28	1	1	0	—		5	0	34	1
Hellas Verona	2019–20	Serie A	15	1	0	0	—		—		15	1
Hellas Verona	2020–21	Serie A	30	0	2	0	—		—		32	0
Hellas Verona	2021–22	Serie A	17	0	1	0	—		—		18	0
Hellas Verona	2022–23	Serie A	23	1	1	0	—		1 (Note: Appearance in Serie A relegation tie-breaker)	0	25	1
Hellas Verona	2023–24	Serie A	28	0	1	1	—		—		29	1
Hellas Verona	2024–25	Serie A	26	0	1	0	—		—		27	0
Hellas Verona	Total		167	3	7	1	—		6	0	180	4
Raków Częstochowa	2025–26	Ekstraklasa	10	0	2	0	0	0	—		12	0
Hellas Verona	2026–27	Serie B	0	0	0	0	—		—		0	0
Career total			336	7	11	1	0	0	8	0	355	8

=== International ===
As of match played 15 October 2024

Appearances and goals by national team and year
National team	Year	Apps	Goals
Poland
Poland	2015	1	0
Poland	2021	7	0
Poland	2024	9	0
Total		17	0
