= Michele Rocca (footballer) =

Italian footballer (born 1996)

Personal information
- Date of birth: 6 February 1996 (age 30)
- Place of birth: Milan, Italy
- Height: 1.75 m (5 ft 9 in)
- Position: Midfielder

Team information
- Current team: Lumezzane
- Number: 8

Youth career
- –2015: Internazionale
- 2012–2014: → Novara (loan)

Senior career*
Years	Team	Apps	(Gls)
2015–2020	Sampdoria	1	(0)
2016	→ Virtus Lanciano (loan)	19	(0)
2016–2017	→ Latina (loan)	26	(0)
2017–2018	→ Pro Vercelli (loan)	3	(0)
2018	→ FeralpiSalò (loan)	13	(2)
2018–2020	→ Livorno (loan)	32	(2)
2020–2022	Foggia	52	(8)
2022–2023	Novara	32	(3)
2023–2024	Catania	15	(0)
2024–2025	Avellino	34	(1)
2025–	Lumezzane	30	(1)

International career^{‡}
2015–2016	Italy U20	8	(1)
- * Club domestic league appearances and goals as of 29 April 2026 ‡ National team caps and goals as of 15 November 2016

Michele Rocca (born 6 February 1996) is an Italian footballer who plays as a midfielder for Serie C Group A club Lumezzane.

== Club career ==
Born in Milan, Lombardy, Rocca is a youth product of F.C. Internazionale Milano. He was a member of their under-16 side playing in the Allievi B league. Rocca was signed by Serie B club Novara on a temporary deal on 22 August 2012. He represented their under-17 team in the Allievi Nazionali (Serie A and Serie B) league. The loan was renewed on 9 August 2013. Rocca returned to play for Inter's Primavera side in the 2014–15 Campionato Nazionale Primavera season.

=== Sampdoria ===
On 31 August 2015, he was signed by fellow Serie A club Sampdoria for a €400,000 fee. Rocca was afforded the number 92 shirt by Sampdoria. On 28 September 2015, he made his Serie A debut in a 2–1 away defeat to Atalanta at Stadio Atleti Azzurri d'Italia. Rocca was one of twelve players included on the bench for Sampdoria when they faced Milan in the Round of 16 of the Coppa Italia on 17 December 2015.

==== Virtus Lanciano (loan) ====
On 1 February 2016, Sampdoria announced that Rocca had signed a short-term loan with Serie B outfit Virtus Lanciano. His first start for I Frentani came five days later in a 0−2 away victory at Vicenza in the league; of which he played 62 minutes before being replaced by midfielder Manuel Giandonato. Rocca received the first yellow card of his senior club career in a 2–0 away league loss to Spezia on 20 February 2016. His 18th appearance for the club came in their 1−4 home defeat by Salernitana in the 2015–16 Serie B Relegation Play-out first-leg. Rocca was included in the starting lineup for the return leg on 8 June at Stadio Arechi in which Salernitana won by a single goal scored by striker Massimo Coda (with the game finishing 5–1 on aggregate to the home side) thus relegating Virtus Lanciano to Lega Pro.

==== Latina (loan) ====
In July 2016, Serie B side Latina announced that they had signed both Rocca and Gabriele Rolando from Sampdoria on loan, with an option to purchase the pair on permanent deals at the end of the season. He was assigned the number 29 shirt, the reverse to his squad number 92 at Sampdoria. Latina then gave him the number 8 jersey to wear for the rest of the 2016–17 season (after Luigi Scaglia left the club).

==== Pro Vercelli (loan) ====
On 31 August 2017, Rocca joined Serie B side Pro Vercelli on a year-long loan. On 16 September, he made his debut for Pro Vercelli as a substitute, replacing Umberto Germano in the 71st minute of a 0–0 away draw with Brescia. After managing just three appearances, his loan was cancelled and the player returned to his parent club.

==== FeralpiSalò (loan) ====
On 19 January 2018, Rocca was signed by Serie C side FeralpiSalò on a six-month loan deal. On 20 January, he made his Serie C debut for FeralpiSalò in a 1–0 home win over Sambenedettese, he was replaced by Luca Parodi in the 56th minute. On 25 March, he scored his first professional goal, as a substitute, in the 31st minute of a 1–1 away draw with Fermana. On 29 April, he scored his second goal, again as a substitute, in the 90th minute of a 4–1 home win over Triestina. Rocca ended his loan spell at FeralpiSalò with 13 appearances and 2 goals.

==== Livorno (loan) ====
On 13 July 2018, Rocca joined newly promoted Livorno on a two-season loan. He was handed his debut for Livorno on 5 August 2018, in the second round of the Coppa Italia, against Casertana. The match ended as a 1–1 draw and would eventually be decided on penalties after it remained one apiece following extra time. Livorno would go on to claim a 7–6 victory in the shoot-out to send them through to the next round. On 2 September, Rocca made his league debut for Livorno in Gameweek 2 of the Serie B season, as a starter, in an away visit to Pescara. Livorno would go on to lose the match 1–2.

=== Serie C ===
On 16 October 2020, he joined Serie C club Foggia.

On 18 July 2022, Rocca returned to Novara, signing a two-year contract.

On 21 July 2023, he signed for Catania.

On 30 January 2024, Rocca moved to Avellino.
