= Gaetano Monachello =

Italian footballer

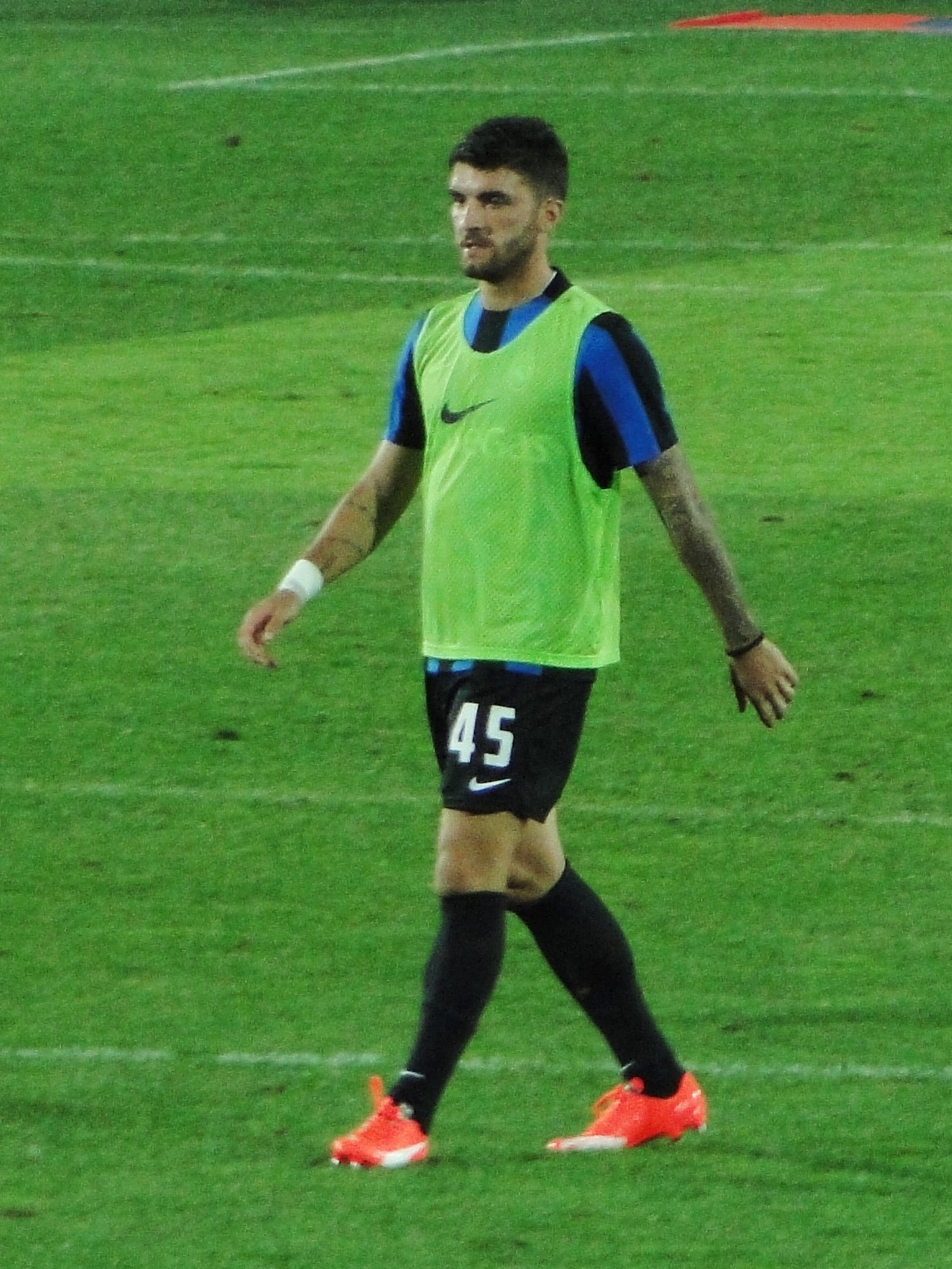

Personal information
- Date of birth: 3 March 1994 (age 32)
- Place of birth: Agrigento, Italy
- Height: 1.87 m (6 ft 1 1/2 in)
- Position: Striker

Team information
- Current team: Lumezzane
- Number: 45

Youth career
- –2007: Gattopardo Calcio
- 2007–2012: Inter Milan
- 2012: → Parma (loan)

Senior career*
| Years | Team | Apps | (Gls) |
| 2012–2013 | Metalurh Donetsk | 4 | (0) |
| 2013 | Olympiakos Nicosia | 14 | (7) |
| 2013–2015 | Monaco | 0 | (0) |
| 2013 | → Cercle Brugge (loan) | 14 | (1) |
| 2014 | → Ergotelis (loan) | 10 | (2) |
| 2014–2015 | → Virtus Lanciano (loan) | 35 | (8) |
| 2015–2020 | Atalanta | 9 | (0) |
| 2016 | → Bari (loan) | 4 | (2) |
| 2017 | → Ternana (loan) | 10 | (0) |
| 2017–2018 | → Palermo (loan) | 5 | (1) |
| 2018 | → Ascoli (loan) | 21 | (7) |
| 2018–2019 | → Pescara (loan) | 25 | (5) |
| 2019–2020 | → Pordenone (loan) | 11 | (0) |
| 2020 | → Venezia (loan) | 12 | (0) |
| 2020–2022 | Modena | 23 | (5) |
| 2022–2024 | Mantova | 51 | (12) |
| 2024– | Lumezzane | 38 | (7) |

International career
| 2010–2011 | Italy U-17 | 9 | (2) |
| 2015–2016 | Italy U-21 | 8 | (2) |
- * Club domestic league appearances and goals as of 29 April 2026

Gaetano Monachello (Italian pronunciation: [ɡa.eˈtaːno monaˈkɛllo]; born 3 March 1994) is an Italian footballer who plays as a striker for Serie C Group A club Lumezzane.

== Club career ==
Monachello was called up for the squad in Allievi Nazionali U-17 team and also participated in The 2011 Granatkin Memorial in Moscow which took place from 3 to 9 January 2011

In March 2012, he signed a contract with SC Tavriya, which was confirmed in June 2012. But two weeks later, in July 2012 it was announced that his club would be FC Metalurh Donetsk of the Ukrainian Premier League.

In January 2013, Monachello left Metalurh Donetsk for Olympiakos Nicosia on a free transfer signing for six months.

Monachello then transferred to AS Monaco in June 2013. Two months later it was announced that he would play on loan for Monaco's Belgian partner football club Cercle Brugge until the end of the 2013–14 football season. He made his debut on 10 August 2013, coming on as a substitute in the 57th minutes, as Cercle Brugge and Lierse drew 1–1. His first goal came on 5 October 2013, when he scored the club's first goal game before setting up the second in a 2–1 win over Mechelen. He mostly came on as a substitute in the second half, as his minutes significantly decreased. After five months at the club, his loan spell with Cercle Brugge ended.After the end of the loan Gaetano had to choose his next station for his career. Despite interest from Bolton, Bournemouth and Blackpool he chose his next team to be the Cretan side Ergotelis F.C as he played for the 2013-14 season scoring two goals.

Monachello signed for Atalanta on 23 July 2015.

Monachello signed for US Palermo on 31 August 2017.

On 15 January 2020, his loan to Pordenone was terminated early. On the same day, he was loaned to Venezia.

On 3 October 2020, he moved to Serie C club Modena on a permanent basis.

On 25 January 2022, he was transferred to Serie C club Mantova on a permanent basis.

On 26 July 2024, Monachello joined Lumezzane on a two-season deal.

== International career ==
He made his debut with the Italy U21 team on 8 September 2015, in a qualification march against Slovenia.
