= Vincenzo Plescia =

Italian footballer

Personal information
- Date of birth: 18 February 1998 (age 28)
- Place of birth: Palermo, Italy
- Height: 1.80 m (5 ft 11 in)
- Position: Forward

Team information
- Current team: Latina
- Number: 28

Youth career
- 2006–2017: Palermo

Senior career*
Years	Team	Apps	(Gls)
2017–2018	Palermo	0	(0)
2017–2018	→ Siracusa (loan)	0	(0)
2018	→ Roccella (loan)	14	(9)
2018–2019	Empoli	0	(0)
2018–2019	→ Gubbio (loan)	32	(3)
2019–2021	Renate	23	(3)
2020–2021	→ Vibonese (loan)	31	(11)
2021–2023	Avellino	26	(2)
2022	→ Carrarese (loan)	2	(0)
2023	→ Piacenza (loan)	17	(2)
2023–2024	Messina	34	(5)
2024–2025	Renate	34	(3)
2025–2026	Sorrento	22	(3)
2026	→ Alcione (loan)	16	(2)
2026-	Latina	0	(0)
- * Club domestic league appearances and goals as of 26 August 2026

Vincenzo Plescia (born 18 February 1998) is an Italian professional footballer who plays as a forward for Serie C Group B club Latina.

== Club career ==
He made his Serie C debut for Gubbio on 23 September 2018 in a game against Vis Pesaro.

On 15 July 2019, he joined Renate. On 2 October 2020 he moved on loan to Vibonese.

On 2 August 2021, Plescia joined Avellino. On 23 July 2022, he was loaned to Carrarese, with an option to buy. On 2 January 2023, Plescia moved on a new loan to Piacenza.

On 1 September 2023, Plescia signed with Messina.

On 26 August 2026 Plescia signed for Latina.
