= Mariano Arini =

Italian footballer

Personal information
- Date of birth: 17 January 1987 (age 39)
- Place of birth: Naples, Italy
- Height: 1.78 m (5 ft 10 in)
- Position: Midfielder

Team information
- Current team: Pergolettese
- Number: 4

Youth career
- Napoli
- 2004–2005: Rangers
- 2005–2007: Roma

Senior career*
Years	Team	Apps	(Gls)
2007–2011	Aversa Normanna	109	(13)
2011–2013	Andria BAT	44	(5)
2013–2016	Avellino	123	(12)
2016–2017	SPAL	37	(3)
2017–2020	Cremonese	103	(6)
2020–2021	Arezzo	29	(1)
2021–	Pergolettese	179	(5)
- * Club domestic league appearances and goals as of 30 April 2026

Mariano Arini (born 17 January 1987) is an Italian professional footballer who plays as a central midfielder for Serie C Group A club Pergolettese.

== Club career ==
Born in Naples, Arini began his youth career with hometown's Napoli, and after the club's bankruptcy he moved to Scotland, joining Rangers. In January 2005 he returned to Italy, signing with Roma.

Arini made his senior debuts with Aversa Normanna in Serie D, and moved to Andria BAT in July 2011.

On 10 January 2013 Arini joined Avellino, taking part of the squad who won the 2012–13 Lega Pro Prima Divisione.

On 24 August Arini made his Serie B debut, starting in a 2–1 home success over Novara; his first goal came on 21 September, in a 1–1 home draw against Varese.

On 8 July 2021 he moved to Pergolettese.
