= Gabriele Rolando =

Italian footballer

Personal information
- Date of birth: 2 April 1995 (age 31)
- Place of birth: Genoa, Italy
- Height: 1.82 m (6 ft 0 in)
- Positions: Right winger; right-back

Youth career
- 2012–2014: Sampdoria

Senior career*
Years	Team	Apps	(Gls)
2015–2019	Sampdoria	0	(0)
2014–2015	→ Como (loan)	20	(2)
2015–2016	→ Matera (loan)	21	(3)
2016–2017	→ Latina (loan)	23	(1)
2017–2018	→ Palermo (loan)	14	(1)
2019	→ Carpi (loan)	15	(2)
2019–2021	Reggina	34	(1)
2021	→ Bari (loan)	17	(0)
2021–2023	Catanzaro	26	(1)
- * Club domestic league appearances and goals as of 23 April 2023

Gabriele Rolando (born 2 April 1995) is an Italian professional footballer. He primarily plays as a right-winger, but can also be deployed as a right-back.

== Career ==
=== Sampdoria ===
Born in Genoa, Liguria, Rolando joined hometown club Sampdoria in 2012. He graduated from the youth academy and was promoted to the first team. During his time spent in the academy, he won a single Scudetto with the under-17 team in the Allievi Nazionali league, in the 2011–12 season.

==== Loan to Como ====
On 11 June 2014, Rolando was sent out on loan to newly-promoted Serie C side Como on a season-long loan. On 10 August, he made his professional debut as a starter in the first round of the Coppa Italia, he was replaced by Giacomo Casoli in the 58th minute of a 5–0 home win over Matelica. Rolando's first senior start for the club, came on 31 August 2014, when he was named in their starting lineup for the game against Südtirol at the Stadio Giuseppe Sinigaglia (resulting in a 0–0 home draw). He was named on the substitutes' bench for the away fixture against AlbinoLeffe, after 62 minutes, Rolando was called upon to replace fellow defender Marco Russu in a 0–2 victory for the visiting side. On 10 October, Rolando scored his first professional goal in the 41st minute of a 4–3 home win over Pro Patria. On 26 October, he scored his second goal in the 42nd minute of a 2–0 home win over Renate. Rolando ended his loan to Como with 23 appearances, 2 goals and 2 assists.

==== Loan to Matera ====
On 10 July 2015, Rolando was signed by Serie C side Matera on a season-long loan deal. On 2 August, he made his debut for Matera, as a substitute, replacing Antonio Meola in the 76th minute of a 1–0 home defeat against Südtirol in the first round of the Coppa Italia. On 13 September, Rolando made his Serie C debut, as a substitute, replacing Antonio Meola in the 73rd minute of a 3–0 away defeat against Fidelis Andria. On 5 December, Rolando scored his first goal for Matera in the 28th minute of a 2–1 home win over Paganese. On 12 December, he played his first entire match for the club, a 5–0 away win over Ischia. On 16 January 2016, he scored his second goal in the 39th minute of a 4–1 away win over Akragas. On 7 March 2016, Rolando scored his third goal in a 1–0 home win against Cosenza. On 19 March, he received a red card in the 87th minute of a 1–1 away draw against Juve Stabia. Rolando ended his loan to Matera with 22 appearances, 3 goals and 2 assists.

==== Loan to Latina ====
On 29 July 2016, Serie B side Latina announced that they had signed both Rolando and Michele Rocca from Sampdoria on loan, with an option to purchase the pair on permanent deals. On 7 August, Rolando made his debut for Latina, as a substitute, replacing MacDonald Mariga in the 61st minute of a 1–0 home win over Matera in the second round of the Coppa Italia. On 2 October, Rolando made his Serie B debut, as a substitute, replacing Luca Di Matteo in the 83rd minute and he scored his first goal for Latina in the 93rd minute of a 2–2 away draw against Cesena. On 30 December, he made his first start for Latina against Avellino, he was replaced by Christian D'Urso in the 79th minute of a 0–0 home draw. Rolando ended his season-long loan to Latina with 25 appearances, 1 goal and 1 assist, though he did not play an entire match during his time there.

==== Loan to Palermo ====
On 11 July 2017, Rolando joined newly-relegated Serie B side Palermo on a season-long loan, with an option to make the move permanent at the end of the 2017–18 season. On 2 September, he made his debut in Serie B for Palermo, as a starter in a 0–0 away draw against Brescia, he was replaced by Andrea Accardi in the 90th minute. Seven weeks later, on 24 October, Rolando played his first entire match for Palermo, a 3–1 away win over Carpi. On 5 May 2018, he scored his first goal for Palermo in the 61st minute of a 3–2 away win over Ternana. Rolando ended his season-long loan to Palermo with 14 appearances and 1 goal.

==== Loan to Carpi ====
On 21 January 2019, Rolando was loaned to Serie B club Carpi on a 6-month loan deal. Five days later, on 26 January, he made his debut for the club in a 3–1 away defeat against Cittadella, he was replaced by Paolo Frascatore in the 88th minute. On 9 February, Rolando played his first entire match for Carpi and he scored his first goal of the season in the 22nd minute of a 3–1 away defeat against Brescia. He became Carpi's first-choice during the second part season. On 1 May he scored his second goal in the 53rd minute of a 2–1 home defeat against Cremonese. Rolando ended his 6-month loan to Carpi with 15 appearances, including 13 as a starter, 2 goals and 2 assists.

=== Reggina ===
On 19 August 2019, Rolando joined Serie C club Reggina for an undisclosed fee, signing a three-year contract. On 25 August, he made his debut for the club as a substitute replacing Desiderio Garufo in the 61st minute of a 1–1 away draw against Virtus Francavilla. On 16 September, Rolando played his first match as a starter for Reggina, a 1–1 away draw against Bari, he was replaced by Desiderio Garufo after 69 minutes. Three weeks later, on 6 October, he played his first entire match for the club, a 1–1 away draw against Paganese. On 23 October, he scored his first goal for the club in the 45th minute of a 4–1 home win over Picerno.

On 21 January 2021, he joined Bari on loan. Bari would be obligated to purchase his rights in case of their promotion to Serie B at the end of the season. They were not promoted.

=== Catanzaro ===
On 28 July 2021, he signed a two-year contract with Catanzaro.

== Career statistics ==
=== Club ===
As of match played 24 April 2022

Club	Season	League			Cup		Europe		Other		Total	
Club	Season	League	Apps	Goals	Apps	Goals	Apps	Goals	Apps	Goals	Apps	Goals
Sampdoria	2018–19	Serie A	0	0	1	0	—		—		1	0
Como (loan)	2014–15	Serie C	19	2	3	0	—		1 (Note: All appearance(s) in Serie C play-off.)	0	23	2
Matera (loan)	2015–16	Serie C	21	3	1	0	—		—		22	3
Latina (loan)	2016–17	Serie B	23	1	2	0	—		—		25	1
Palermo (loan)	2017–18	Serie B	12	1	0	0	—		2 (Note: All appearance(s) in Serie B play-off.)	0	14	1
Carpi (loan)	2018–19	Serie B	15	2	—		—		—		15	2
Reggina	2019–20	Serie C	23	1	0	0	—		—		23	1
Reggina	2020–21	Serie B	11	0	1	0	—		—		12	0
Reggina	Total		34	1	1	0	—		0	0	35	1
Bari (loan)	2020–21	Serie C	17	0	—		—		2	0	18	0
Catanzaro	2021–22	Serie C	16	1	2	0	—		—		18	1
Career total			157	11	10	0	—		5	0	171	11
