= Davide Petermann =

Italian footballer (born 1994)

Personal information
- Date of birth: 25 December 1994 (age 31)
- Place of birth: Rome, Italy
- Height: 1.86 m (6 ft 1 in)
- Position: Midfielder

Youth career
- 2009–2011: Siena
- 2012–2014: Palermo

Senior career*
Years	Team	Apps	(Gls)
2012–2018	Palermo	1	(0)
2014–2015	→ Südtirol (loan)	6	(0)
2015	→ Torres (loan)	9	(1)
2015	→ Santarcangelo (loan)	10	(1)
2016–2017	→ Teramo (loan)	13	(0)
2017	→ Carrarese (loan)	10	(0)
2018	→ Sicula Leonzio (loan)	12	(0)
2018–2019	Reggina	12	(0)
2019	→ Pistoiese (loan)	14	(2)
2019–2020	Vibonese	27	(3)
2020–2021	Cesena	34	(2)
2021–2023	Foggia	65	(11)
2023–2024	Virtus Entella	35	(4)
2024–2025	Latina	29	(2)
2025–2026	Foggia	13	(2)
- * Club domestic league appearances and goals as of 1 May 2026

Davide Petermann (born 25 December 1994) is an Italian professional footballer who plays as a midfielder.

== Career ==
On 8 August 2018, he signed a two-year contract with Reggina.

On 31 January 2019, he joined Pistoiese on loan.

On 20 August 2020 he signed a 2-year contract with Cesena.

On 14 July 2021 he moved to Foggia on a two-year contract.

On 20 July 2023, Petermann signed with Virtus Entella.
