= Carmine Setola =

Italian footballer (born 1999)

Personal information
- Date of birth: 13 January 1999 (age 27)
- Place of birth: Cerreto Sannita, Italy
- Height: 1.72 m (5 ft 8 in)
- Positions: Full-back; winger

Team information
- Current team: Gelbison
- Number: 99

Youth career
- 2008–2010: Rimini
- 2010–2016: Cesena

Senior career*
| Years | Team | Apps | (Gls) |
| 2016–2017 | Cesena | 4 | (0) |
| 2017–2019 | Palermo | 0 | (0) |
| 2017–2018 | → Cesena (loan) | 0 | (0) |
| 2018 | → Pisa (loan) | 1 | (0) |
| 2018–2019 | → Fano (loan) | 15 | (0) |
| 2019–2020 | Siena | 6 | (0) |
| 2020 | → Virtus Francavilla (loan) | 1 | (0) |
| 2020–2021 | Casertana | 13 | (0) |
| 2021 | Giugliano | 16 | (0) |
| 2021–2023 | Picerno | 33 | (2) |
| 2023–2024 | Paganese | 30 | (0) |
| 2024– | Gelbison | 11 | (0) |

International career^{‡}
| 2015–2016 | Italy U17 | 6 | (0) |
| 2016–2017 | Italy U18 | 4 | (1) |
- * Club domestic league appearances and goals as of 17 November 2024 ‡ National team caps and goals as of 8 February 2017

Carmine Setola (born 13 January 1999) is an Italian footballer who plays for Serie D club Gelbison.

== Career ==
=== Early career ===
Setola was born in the Campania town of Cerreto Sannita, but began his career in the youth teams of Lega Pro side Rimini after moving to the Emilia-Romagna region aged 8. After two years at Rimini, including winning the prestigious Imola tournament and being crowned Player of the Tournament, Serie B Cesena signed Setola for their youth teams. Setola impressed at various youth levels, playing in both full-back and wide-midfield roles.

=== 2016–17 Season ===
Setola was named in the full Cesena squad for the 2016–17 season, but spent the first 14 games of the season as an unused substitute. He eventually made his debut, on 19 November 2016, playing the full game at right-back in a 0–1 loss to Spezia.

=== Siena ===
On 29 July 2019, he signed a 2-year contract with Siena. On 31 January 2020, he joined Virtus Francavilla on loan.

=== Casertana ===
On 19 September 2020, he joined Casertana. The contract was terminated by mutual consent on 1 February 2021.

=== Picerno ===
On 6 August 2021, he signed with Picerno.

=== National career ===
Setola was first called into the Italy national set-up by under-17 coach Alessandro Dal Canto for a friendly game against France. He played the full game at right-midfield. He was then involved in all three European Under-17 Championship Elite Round qualification matches. However, he only played in one of the tournament group games, as Italy were eliminated. Setola was called up to the Italy U18 by Paolo Nicolato for friendlies against Slovenia and England. In the 5–1 win over Slovenia, Setola scored his first international goal in the 25th minute, after being assisted by Marco Olivieri.
