= Paolo Grillo =

Italian footballer (born 1997)

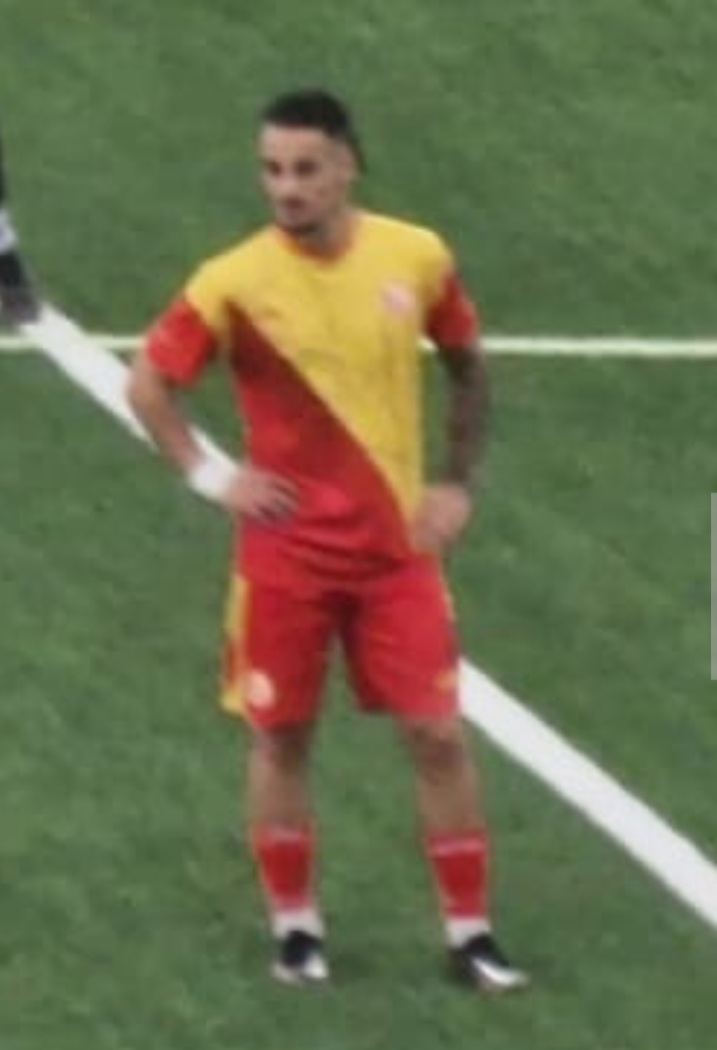
- Paolo Grillo with Sicily national football team in 2023

Personal information
- Date of birth: 8 February 1997 (age 29)
- Place of birth: Partinico, Italy
- Height: 1.78 m (5 ft 10 in)
- Position: Forward

Team information
- Current team: Athletic Club Palermo
- Number: 44

Youth career
- –2016: Palermo

Senior career*
Years	Team	Apps	(Gls)
2016–2018	Palermo	0	(0)
2016–2017	→ Siena (loan)	26	(1)
2017–2018	→ Siracusa (loan)	17	(1)
2018–2019	Pro Vercelli	8	(0)
2019–2020	Sicula Leonzio	27	(5)
2020–2021	Cittadella	4	(0)
2021	→ Catanzaro (loan)	6	(0)
2021–2022	Vibonese	26	(0)
2022–2023	Messina	22	(1)
2023–2024	Akragas	23	(5)
2024–2025	Reggina	28	(3)
2025–	Athletic Club Palermo	16	(4)
- * Club domestic league appearances and goals as of 19 April 2026

Paolo Grillo (born 8 February 1997) is an Italian football player who plays for Serie D club Athletic Club Palermo.

== Club career ==
He was raised in the youth teams of Palermo, but did not appear for the senior squad. He spent the first 4 seasons of his senior career in Serie C.

On 21 August 2020, he joined Serie B club Cittadella. He made his Serie B debut for Cittadella on 31 October 2020 in a game against Monza. He substituted Christian D'Urso in the 90th minute. On 1 February 2021, he was loaned to Serie C club Catanzaro.

On 22 July 2021, he signed with Vibonese.

On 26 July 2022, Grillo moved to Messina on a one-year contract with an option to extend.

After Messina, Grillo played for Akragas and Reggina before joining Athletic Club Palermo on 4 December 2025.
