= Fabrizio Alastra =

Italian footballer (born 1997)

Personal information
- Date of birth: 1 October 1997 (age 29)
- Place of birth: Erice, Italy
- Height: 1.85 m (6 ft 1 in)
- Position: Goalkeeper

Team information
- Current team: Team Altamura
- Number: 97

Youth career
- –2013: Trapani
- 2013–2016: Palermo

Senior career*
Years	Team	Apps	(Gls)
2014–2019	Palermo	2	(0)
2016–2017	→ Matera (loan)	10	(0)
2017	→ Benevento (loan)	0	(0)
2017–2018	→ Prato (loan)	23	(0)
2019–2021	Parma	0	(0)
2020	→ Pescara (loan)	0	(0)
2020–2021	→ Pescara (loan)	0	(0)
2021–2022	Foggia	17	(0)
2022–2026	Potenza	66	(0)
2026–	Team Altamura	18	(0)

International career^{‡}
2018	Italy U20	1	(0)
- * Club domestic league appearances and goals as of 1 May 2026 ‡ National team caps and goals as of 25 April 2018

Fabrizio Alastra (born 1 October 1997) is an Italian professional footballer who plays as a goalkeeper for Serie C Group C club Team Altamura.

== Club career ==
Alastra is a youth product from Palermo. He made his Serie A debut on 14 February 2016 against Torino, replacing Stefano Sorrentino after 38 minutes of a 1–3 away defeat.

On 30 January 2020, he joined Pescara on loan until the end of the season.

After appearing on the bench for Parma in the first two games of the 2020–21 Serie A season, on 5 October 2020 he returned to Pescara on another loan.

On 10 July 2021, he signed with Foggia.

On 25 August 2022, Alastra joined Potenza on a one-year contract.

== International career ==
On 25 April 2018, Alastra played a friendly match with Italy U20 against Croatia U20.
