= Andrea Accardi =

Italian footballer (born 1995)

Personal information
- Date of birth: 30 July 1995 (age 31)
- Place of birth: Palermo, Italy
- Height: 1.80 m (5 ft 11 in)
- Position: Defender

Team information
- Current team: Pistoiese
- Number: 4

Youth career
- Monreale
- 2005–2015: Palermo

Senior career*
Years	Team	Apps	(Gls)
2015–2023	Palermo	75	(0)
2015–2016	→ Trapani (loan)	2	(0)
2016–2017	→ Modena (loan)	24	(0)
2023	Piacenza	16	(1)
2023–2024	Virtus Francavilla	19	(0)
2024–	Pistoiese	1	(0)
- * Club domestic league appearances and goals as of 17 November 2024

Andrea Accardi (born 30 July 1995) is an Italian football player who plays for Serie D club Pistoiese.

== Club career ==
He made his Serie B debut for Trapani on 24 October 2015 in a game against Cagliari.

Following Palermo's exclusion from the Serie B, he was released together with all other players. Following Palermo's refoundation in August 2019 as a phoenix club and its admission to Serie D, he was re-signed by the Rosanero, thus becoming the only player from the past season's Serie B campaign who agreed to stay at the club.

On 3 January 2023, after making no appearances in the first half of the 2022–23 Serie B campaign with the Rosanero, Accardi left Palermo to join Serie C club Piacenza on a permanent transfer until the end of the season.

On 15 August 2023, Accardi signed with Virtus Francavilla.

== Career statistics ==
=== Club ===
As of 8 May 2022

Appearances and goals by club, season and competition
Club	Season	League			National cup		Other		Total	
Club	Season	Division	Apps	Goals	Apps	Goals	Apps	Goals	Apps	Goals
Palermo	2014–15	Serie A	0	0	0	0	—		0	0
Palermo	2017–18	Serie B	7	0	1	0	0	0	8	0
Palermo	2018–19	Serie B	1	0	0	0	—		1	0
Palermo	2019–20	Serie D	16	0	1	0	—		17	0
Palermo	2020–21	Serie C	29	0	—		4 (Note: All appearance(s) in promotion play-offs.)	0	33	0
Palermo	2021–22	Serie C	15	0	0	0	1	0	16	0
Palermo	Total		68	0	2	0	5	0	75	0
Trapani (loan)	2015–16	Serie B	2	0	0	0	0	0	2	0
Modena (loan)	2016–17	Lega Pro	24	0	2	0	—		26	0
Career total			94	0	4	0	5	0	103	0
