= Andrea Ingegneri =

Italian footballer (born 1992)

Personal information
- Date of birth: 18 January 1992 (age 34)
- Place of birth: Lugo, Italy
- Height: 1.84 m (6 ft 0 in)
- Position: Centre-back

Team information
- Current team: Sasso Marconi

Youth career
- Bologna

Senior career*
Years	Team	Apps	(Gls)
2012–2013	Bologna	0	(0)
2012–2013	→ Forlì (loan)	25	(1)
2013–2017	Cesena	7	(0)
2014–2015	→ Bassano (loan)	11	(0)
2015–2017	→ Pordenone (loan)	47	(4)
2017–2019	Palermo	0	(0)
2019–2022	Modena	45	(3)
2022–2023	Mantova	9	(0)
2023	Viterbese	6	(0)
2023–2025	Reggina	23	(0)
2025–2026	Tuttocuoio	8	(0)
2026–	Sasso Marconi	1	(0)
- * Club domestic league appearances and goals as of 22 February 2026

Andrea Ingegneri (born 18 January 1992) is an Italian professional footballer who plays as a centre-back for Serie D club Sasso Marconi.

== Club career ==
=== Bologna ===
Ingegneri started his career at Bologna.

=== Cesena ===
In June 2013 Ingegneri joined Cesena for €1.25 million in a co-ownership deal as part of the deal of Damjan Đoković for €1.4 million. Ingegneri signed a 4-year contract. Ingegneri picked no.18 shirt previously owned by Gianluca Turchetta. In June 2014 the co-ownership deals were renewed.

On 25 August Ingegneri was signed by Bassano in a temporary deal. On 25 June 2015 the co-ownership deals expired.

In July 2015 Ingegneri was signed by Pordenone in a temporary deal.

=== Palermo ===
On 6 July 2017 Ingegneri signed a 4-year contract with Palermo, under request of his former Pordenone boss Bruno Tedino, who was appointed in charge of the Rosanero for the new season. He was however sidelined by a broken anterior cruciate ligament during pre-season which forced him to skip the entire 2017–18 season, during which he made no appearances.

=== Modena ===
Following Palermo's dissolution, he joined newly promoted Serie C club Modena for the 2019–20 season. He made his debut on 25 September 2019, coming on as a substitute in the 58th minute for Salvatore Pezzella in a 1–1 draw against Sambenedettese He finished his first season as a gialloblù with 19 appearances in which he did not manage to score.

On 4 October 2020, Ingegneri scored his first goal for Modena in a 3–1 win over Vis Pesaro after a cross from Sodinha. In his second season at the club, he recorded 25 appearances in which he scored 2 goals.

=== Mantova ===
On 20 August 2022, Ingegneri signed with Mantova.

=== Viterbese ===
On 30 January 2023, Ingegneri moved to Viterbese.

=== Reggina ===
On 16 September 2023, Ingegneri signed a 2 year contract with Reggina.
