= Ilija Nestorovski =

Macedonian footballer

Personal information
- Full name: Ilija Nestorovski; Илија Несторовски
- Date of birth: 12 March 1990 (age 36)
- Place of birth: Prilep, SR Macedonia, Yugoslavia
- Height: 1.83 m (6 ft 0 in)
- Position: Forward

Team information
- Current team: Slaven Belupo
- Number: 90

Youth career
- 2000–2006: Pobeda

Senior career*
Years	Team	Apps	(Gls)
2006–2010	Pobeda	96	(39)
2010–2015	Slovácko	28	(2)
2011–2012	→ Viktoria Žižkov (loan)	13	(1)
2012–2013	→ Metalurg (loan)	20	(1)
2013–2015	→ Inter Zaprešić (loan)	57	(44)
2015–2016	Inter Zaprešić	33	(25)
2016–2019	Palermo	94	(38)
2019–2023	Udinese	78	(8)
2023–2024	Ascoli	20	(2)
2024–	Slaven Belupo	56	(21)

International career^{‡}
	Macedonia U19	3	(1)
2009–2012	Macedonia U21	19	(5)
2015–2023	North Macedonia	52	(10)
- * Club domestic league appearances and goals as of 12 October 2026 ‡ National team caps and goals as of 12 November 2023

Ilija Nestorovski (Macedonian: Илија Несторовски; born 12 March 1990) is a Macedonian professional footballer who plays as a forward for Croatian First Football League club Slaven Belupo and the North Macedonia national team.

== Club career ==
Born in Prilep, Nestorovski started his career at hometown club FK Pobeda. Joining their youth academy in 2000, he made his senior debut in 2006. Between 2006 and 2010, he made 96 league appearances for Pobeda, scoring 39 goals.

In the early weeks of 2010, Nestorovski then moved to Czech First League side Slovácko. He made eleven appearances in the remaining matches of the season, scoring his first and only league goal for that campaign in a 3–1 win over Slavia Prague. The following season, he made seventeen appearances, once more scoring a single league goal.

Nestorovski then went out on loan to Viktoria Žižkov where he spent the first half of the 2011–12 season. He left the relegation battlers in January 2012 and moved to Metalurg Skopje, spending the next twelve months with the club.

After not playing a single game for almost six months, Nestorovski signed for Inter Zaprešić on 9 August 2013, initially on a loan deal. He had a breakout year, scoring 20 times in the Croatian Second Football League and twice in the Croatian Football Cup. He extended his loan deal for another twelve months with Inter over the summer. The following season, Nestorovski found even more success, netting 24 times in 27 league games as Inter were promoted to the Croatian First Football League. Inter then signed him on a permanent deal.

After scoring thirteen times in the first half of the 1. HNL, Nestorovski was signed by Italian Serie A side Palermo, but spent the remainder of the 2015–16 season with Inter, where he finished as a league top scorer with 25 goals. Inter received a transfer fee of €500,000 while the player signed a four-year contract, starting in July 2016. After a first season with eleven goals and three assists he was chosen as captain after deciding to remain in the relegating club of Palermo despite interests from clubs such as Fiorentina and Everton.

On 26 July 2019, Nestorovski signed with Udinese, after Palermo were excluded from Serie B.

On 29 August 2023, Nestorovski signed a two-year contract with Ascoli.

On 30 August 2024, Nestorovski joined Slaven Belupo in Croatia for one season.

== International career ==
Nestorovski played for the Macedonia national under-21 football team, and played in all six of their group matches in the 2013 UEFA European Under-21 Football Championship.

He made his senior international debut for Macedonia in a UEFA Euro 2016 qualifying against Ukraine on 9 October 2015. On 29 May 2016, he scored his first goal for the national team against Azerbaijan in a friendly match in Austria.

== Career statistics ==
=== Club ===
As of match played 16 December 2023

Appearances and goals by club, season and competition
Club	Season	League			National Cup		Continental		Other		Total	
Club	Season	Division	Apps	Goals	Apps	Goals	Apps	Goals	Apps	Goals	Apps	Goals
Pobeda	2007–08	Macedonian First League	0	0	0	0	2 (Note: Appearances in UEFA Champions League qualifying phase)	0	—		2	0
Pobeda	2009–10	Macedonian First League	15	10	0	0	—		—		15	10
Pobeda	Total		15	10	0	0	2	0	—		17	10
Slovácko	2009–10	Czech First League	11	1	0	0	—		—		11	1
Slovácko	2010–11	Czech First League	16	1	0	0	—		—		16	1
Slovácko	Total		27	2	0	0	—		—		27	2
Viktoria Zizkov (loan)	2011–12	Czech First League	13	1	0	0	—		—		13	1
Metalurg (loan)	2011–12	Macedonian First League	14	1	0	0	—		—		14	1
Metalurg (loan)	2012–13	Macedonian First League	6	0	0	0	4 (Note: Appearances in UEFA Europa League qualifying phase)	1	—		10	1
Metalurg (loan)	Total		20	1	0	0	4	1	—		24	2
Inter Zaprešić	2013–14	2. HNL	30	20	4	2	—		—		34	22
Inter Zaprešić	2014–15	2. HNL	27	24	0	0	—		—		27	24
Inter Zaprešić	2015–16	1. HNL	33	25	2	0	—		—		35	25
Inter Zaprešić	Total		90	69	6	2	—		—		96	71
Palermo	2016–17	Serie A	37	11	1	0	—		—		38	11
Palermo	2017–18	Serie B	28	13	2	0	—		3 (Note: Appearances in Serie B promotion play-offs)	0	33	13
Palermo	2018–19	Serie B	26	14	2	1	—		—		28	15
Palermo	Total		91	38	5	1	—		3	0	99	39
Udinese	2019–20	Serie A	28	3	2	0	—		—		30	3
Udinese	2020–21	Serie A	22	2	1	0	—		—		23	2
Udinese	2021–22	Serie A	7	1	2	0	—		—		9	1
Udinese	2022–23	Serie A	21	2	2	0	—		—		22	2
Udinese	Total		78	8	7	0	—		—		84	8
Ascoli	2023–24	Serie B	10	2	0	0	—		—		10	2
Career total			331	130	18	3	6	1	3	0	358	134

=== International ===
As of 12 November 2023

National team	Year	Apps	Goals
North Macedonia	2015	4	0
North Macedonia	2016	7	3
North Macedonia	2017	8	2
North Macedonia	2018	8	3
North Macedonia	2019	9	0
North Macedonia	2020	8	1
North Macedonia	2021	2	1
North Macedonia	2022	2	0
North Macedonia	2023	4	0
Total		52	10

==== International goals ====
As of match played 28 March 2021. North Macedonia score listed first, score column indicates score after each Nestorovski goal.

International goals by date, venue, cap, opponent, score, result and competition
No.	Date	Venue	Cap	Opponent	Score	Result	Competition
1	29 May 2016	Sportplatz Bad Erlach, Bad Erlach, Austria	7	Azerbaijan	3–1	3–1	Friendly
2	6 October 2016	Philip II Arena, Skopje, Macedonia	9	Israel	1–2	1–2	2018 FIFA World Cup qualification
3	9 October 2016	Philip II Arena, Skopje, Macedonia	10	Italy	1–1	2–3	2018 FIFA World Cup qualification
4	24 March 2017	Rheinpark Stadion, Vaduz, Liechtenstein	12	Liechtenstein	2–0	3–0	2018 FIFA World Cup qualification
5	24 March 2017	Rheinpark Stadion, Vaduz, Liechtenstein	12	Liechtenstein	3–0	3–0	2018 FIFA World Cup qualification
6	16 November 2018	Rheinpark Stadion, Vaduz, Liechtenstein	26	Liechtenstein	2–0	2–0	2018–19 UEFA Nations League D
7	19 November 2018	Philip II Arena, Skopje, Macedonia	27	Gibraltar	2–0	4–0	2018–19 UEFA Nations League D
8	19 November 2018	Philip II Arena, Skopje, Macedonia	27	Gibraltar	3–0	4–0	2018–19 UEFA Nations League D
9	5 September 2020	Philip II Arena, Skopje, Macedonia	39	Armenia	2–0	2–1	2020–21 UEFA Nations League C
10	28 March 2021	Philip II Arena, Skopje, Macedonia	46	Liechtenstein	5–0	5–0	2022 FIFA World Cup qualification
