= Housem Ferchichi =

Italian footballer

Personal information
- Date of birth: 26 March 1996 (age 30)
- Place of birth: Montebelluna, Italy
- Height: 1.84 m (6 ft 0 in)
- Position: Midfielder

Team information
- Current team: Modica

Youth career
- –2009: Treviso
- 2009–2014: Montebelluna
- 2013–2014: → Palermo (loan)
- 2014–2016: Palermo

Senior career*
Years	Team	Apps	(Gls)
2015–2018	Palermo	0	(0)
2016–2017	→ Livorno (loan)	11	(0)
2017–2018	→ Vicenza (loan)	1	(0)
2018–2019	Este	15	(0)
2019–2020	Marsala	23	(1)
2021	Rende	24	(4)
2021–2022	Mestre	30	(1)
2022–2023	Montecchio Maggiore	26	(4)
2023	Legnano	5	(0)
2023–2024	Chions	17	(0)
2024–2025	Termoli	13	(0)
2025	Portogruaro	11	(2)
2025–2026	Vigasio	17	(3)
2026–	Modica	0	(0)
- * Club domestic league appearances and goals as of 27 September 2026

Housem Ferchichi (born 26 March 1996) is an Italian footballer who plays as a midfielder for Serie D club Modica.
