= 2018–19 US Città di Palermo season =

Palermo
2018–19 season
- President: Giovanni Giammarva (until 8 August 2018); Clive Richardson (from 29 December 2018 until 5 February 2019); Rino Foschi (from 14 February 2019 until 3 May 2019); Alessandro Albanese (from 3 May 2019)
- Manager: Bruno Tedino (until 26 September 2018); Roberto Stellone (from 26 September 2018 until 23 April 2019); Delio Rossi (from 24 April 2019)
- Stadium: Renzo Barbera
- Serie B: 11th (Relegated to Serie D)
- Coppa Italia: Third round
- Top goalscorer: League: Ilija Nestorovski (14); All: Ilija Nestorovski (15)
- Highest home attendance: 28,351 vs Cittadella (11 May 2019, Serie B)
- Lowest home attendance: 4,513 vs Cosenza (3 November 2018, Serie B)
- Average home league attendance: 9,394
Home colours	Away colours	Third colours

The 2018–19 season was Unione Sportiva Città di Palermo's 2nd consecutive season in Serie B, the second-highest division of Italian football. By the end of the 2018–19 Serie B, Palermo were originally the third-placed team with 63 points, but were relegated to Serie D because the club failed to register in Serie B for financial issues.

== Players ==
=== Squad information ===
Players and squad numbers last updated on 1 March 2019.
Appearances and goals are counted for domestic leagues (Serie A and Serie B) and national cup (Coppa Italia) and correct as of 11 May 2019.
Note: Flags indicate national team as has been defined under FIFA eligibility rules. Players may hold more than one non-FIFA nationality.

No.	Name	Nat	Position(s)	Date of birth (age)	Signed in	Contract ends	Signed from	Transfer Fee	Apps.	Goals
Goalkeepers
1/32	Alberto Brignoli	(Italy)	GK	19 August 1991 (age 35)	2018	2021	(Italy) Juventus	€1M	31	0
1/33	Fabrizio Alastra	(Italy)	GK	1 October 1997 (age 29)	2015	2019	(Italy) Youth Sector	N/A	2	0
12	Leonardo Marson	(Italy)	GK	5 January 1998 (age 28)	2016	2020	(Italy) Youth Sector	N/A	-	-
22	Alberto Pomini	(Italy)	GK	17 March 1981 (age 45)	2017	2019	(Italy) Sassuolo	Undisclosed	32	0
Defenders
2	Giuseppe Bellusci	(Italy)	CB	21 August 1989 (age 37)	2017	2020	(England) Leeds United	Free	59	1
3	Andrea Rispoli	(Italy)	RB / RWB	29 September 1988 (age 38)	2015	2019	(Italy) Parma	Free	137	12
4	Andrea Accardi	(Italy)	CB	30 July 1995 (age 31)	2015	2021	(Italy) Youth Sector	N/A	9	0
5	Slobodan Rajković	(Serbia)	CB	3 February 1989 (age 37)	2016	2020	(Germany) Darmstadt	€1.5M	53	5
6	Aljaž Struna	(Slovenia)	CB / RB	4 August 1990 (age 36)	2012	2019	(Slovenia) Koper	€300,000	67	2
13	Andrea Ingegneri	(Italy)	CB / LB	18 January 1992 (age 34)	2017	2021	(Italy) Pordenone	Undisclosed	-	-
14	Alessandro Salvi	(Italy)	RB / LB	5 June 1988 (age 38)	2018	2020	(Italy) Cittadella	Undisclosed	23	2
19	Haitam Aleesami	(Norway)	LB / LWB	31 July 1991 (age 35)	2016	2019	(Sweden) Göteborg	€1.2M	94	2
23	Corentin Fiore	(Belgium)	LB / CB	24 March 1995 (age 31)	2018	2020	(Belgium) Standard Liège	Free	3	0
24	Przemysław Szymiński	(Poland)	CB / RB	24 June 1994 (age 32)	2017	2020	(Poland) Wisła Płock	€250,000	48	1
27	Antonio Mazzotta	(Italy)	LB / LWB	2 August 1989 (age 37)	2018	2020	(Italy) Pescara	Free	13	1
31	Roberto Pirrello	(Italy)	CB	30 May 1996 (age 30)	2016	2022	(Italy) Youth Sector	N/A	9	1
Midfielders
8	Mato Jajalo	(Bosnia and Herzegovina)	CM / DM	25 May 1988 (age 38)	2015	2019	(Croatia) Rijeka	Free	147	6
18	Ivaylo Chochev	(Bulgaria)	CM	18 February 1993 (age 33)	2014	2020	(Bulgaria) CSKA Sofia	€2M	120	13
21	Luca Fiordilino	(Italy)	DM / CM	25 July 1996 (age 30)	2015	2021	(Italy) Youth Sector	N/A	32	0
25/33	Antonino Gallo	(Italy)	LM	5 January 2000 (age 26)	2018	2021	(Italy) Youth Sector	N/A	-	-
26	Simone Santoro	(Italy)	CM / DM	20 September 1999 (age 27)	2018	2020	(Italy) Youth Sector	N/A	-	-
28/32	Nicolas Haas (Note: On loan.)	(Switzerland)	CM	23 January 1996 (age 30)	2018	2019	(Italy) Atalanta	Free	33	1
35	Radosław Murawski	(Poland)	CM / DM	22 April 1994 (age 32)	2017	2020	(Poland) Piast Gliwice	€650,000	75	3
Forwards
7/10	Aleksandar Trajkovski	(North Macedonia)	SS / AM / CF	5 September 1992 (age 34)	2015	2020	(Belgium) Zulte Waregem	€900,000	113	20
7/15	Simone Lo Faso	(Italy)	SS	18 February 1998 (age 28)	2016	2021	(Italy) Youth Sector	N/A	14	0
9	Stefano Moreo	(Italy)	CF / RW	30 June 1993 (age 33)	2018	2021	(Italy) Venezia	€1.35M	49	6
11	Carlos Embalo	(Guinea-Bissau)	LW	25 November 1994 (age 31)	2013	2020	(Portugal) Chaves	€195,000	34	1
17	Norbert Balogh	(Hungary)	CF	21 February 1996 (age 30)	2016	2020	(Hungary) Debreceni	€2.2M	26	0
20	César Falletti	(Uruguay)	AM / RW / LW	2 December 1992 (age 33)	2018	2019	(Italy) Bologna	Free	32	4
29	George Pușcaș	(Romania)	CF	8 April 1996 (age 30)	2018	2019	(Italy) Inter	Free	33	9
30	Ilija Nestorovski (C)	(North Macedonia)	CF / SS	12 March 1990 (age 36)	2016	2021	(Croatia) Inter Zaprešić	€500,000	99	39
Players transferred in during the season
12	Lorenzo Avogadri (Note: Signed from Atalanta Youth Sector in Summer 2018, transferred to own Youth Sector and then aggregated during the season.)	(Italy)	GK	21 August 2001 (age 25)	2018	2019	(Italy) Youth Sector	Free	-	-
34	Kevin Cannavò	(Italy)	CF	9 February 2000 (age 26)	2018	2022	(Italy) Youth Sector	N/A	2	0
6	Niklas Gunnarsson	(Norway)	RB	27 April 1991 (age 35)	2019	2020	(Sweden) Djurgården	Free	-	-

Name	Signed to	Transfer Fee	Notes
Players transferred out during the season
Norbert Balogh	(Cyprus) APOEL	Free	Out on loan
Leonardo Marson	(Italy) Olbia	Undisclosed	Permanent deal
Corentin Fiore	(Italy) Imolese	Free	Out on loan
Aljaž Struna	(United States) Houston Dynamo	€500,000	Permanent deal
Carlos Embalo	(Italy) Cosenza	Free	Out on loan

== Transfers ==
=== Pre-summer transfers ===
Date	Pos.	Player	Age	Moving from	Fee	Notes	Source
31 May 2018	MF	(Tunisia) Housem Ferchichi	22	(Italy) Vicenza	Free	End of loan	

=== Summer 2018 ===
==== In ====
Date	Pos.	Player	Age	Moving from	Fee	Notes	Source
1 July 2018	GK	(Italy) Fabrizio Alastra	20	(Italy) Prato	Free	End of loan	
1 July 2018	FW	(Guinea-Bissau) Carlos Embalo	23	(Italy) Brescia	Free	End of loan	
1 July 2018	FW	(Italy) Simone Lo Faso	20	(Italy) Fiorentina	Free	End of loan	
1 July 2018	GK	(Italy) Leonardo Marson	20	(Italy) Sassuolo	Free	End of loan	
1 July 2018	DF	(Italy) Roberto Pirrello	22	(Italy) Livorno	Free	End of loan	
1 July 2018	FW	(Italy) Stefano Moreo	25	(Italy) Venezia	€1M	Option to buy exercised	
12 July 2018	DF	(Italy) Antonio Mazzotta	28	(Italy) Pescara	Free	Released	
18 July 2018	DF	(Italy) Alessandro Salvi	30	(Italy) Cittadella	Undisclosed	Permanent deal	
25 July 2018	MF	(Switzerland) Nicolas Haas	22	(Italy) Atalanta	Free	On loan until 30 June 2019	
25 July 2018	GK	(Italy) Alberto Brignoli	26	(Italy) Juventus	€1M	Permanent deal	
8 August 2018	FW	(Romania) George Pușcaș	22	(Italy) Inter	Free	On loan with an obligation to buy for €3.3M after playing 3 games	
13 August 2018	FW	(Uruguay) César Falletti	25	(Italy) Bologna	Free	On loan until 30 June 2019	

==== Out ====
Date	Pos.	Player	Age	Moving to	Fee	Notes	Source
30 June 2018	GK	(Italy) Luca Maniero	23	Unattached	—N/a	Contract expiration	
30 June 2018	DF	(Switzerland) Michel Morganella	29	Unattached	—N/a	Contract expiration	
1 July 2018	DF	(Poland) Paweł Dawidowicz	23	(Portugal) Benfica B	Free	End of loan	
1 July 2018	DF	(Italy) Gabriele Rolando	23	(Italy) Sampdoria	Free	End of loan	
6 July 2018	FW	(Italy) Antonino La Gumina	22	(Italy) Empoli	€9M	Permanent deal	
7 July 2018	GK	(Croatia) Josip Posavec	22	(Croatia) Hajduk Split	Free	On loan until 30 June 2019	
16 July 2018	FW	(Brazil) Igor Coronado	25	(United Arab Emirates) Sharjah	€6M	Permanent deal	
26 July 2018	MF	(France) Eddy Gnahoré	24	(France) Amiens	€500,000	On loan with an obligation to buy for €2.5M after playing 20 games	

==== Other acquisitions ====
Date	Pos.	Player	Age	Moving from	Fee	Notes	Source
1 July 2018	DF	(Italy) Antony Angileri	17	(Italy) Juventus Youth Sector	Free	End of loan	
1 July 2018	FW	(Italy) Accursio Bentivegna	22	(Italy) Carrarese	Free	End of loan	
1 July 2018	FW	(Italy) Francesco Bonfiglio	21	(Italy) AlbinoLeffe	Free	End of loan	
1 July 2018	MF	(Italy) Rosario Costantino	21	(Italy) Fano	Free	End of loan	
1 July 2018	DF	(Italy) Rosario Damiano Maddaloni	19	(Italy) Fano	Free	End of loan	
1 July 2018	MF	(Italy) Dario Giacomarro	23	(Italy) Gubbio	Free	End of loan	
1 July 2018	DF	(Italy) Simone Giuliano	21	(Italy) Sicula Leonzio	Free	End of loan	
1 July 2018	DF	(Italy) Davide Monteleone	22	(Italy) Sicula Leonzio	Free	End of loan	
1 July 2018	MF	(Italy) Davide Petermann	23	(Italy) Sicula Leonzio	Free	End of loan	
1 July 2018	FW	(Italy) Paolo Grillo	21	(Italy) Siracusa	Free	End of loan	
1 July 2018	FW	(Italy) Vincenzo Plescia	20	(Italy) Siracusa	Free	End of loan	
1 July 2018	DF	(Italy) Andrea Punzi	21	(Italy) Siracusa	Free	End of loan	
1 July 2018	MF	(Italy) Marco Toscano	20	(Italy) Siracusa	Free	End of loan	
1 July 2018	MF	(Italy) Gennaro Ruggiero	18	(Italy) Torino Primavera	Free	End of loan	
1 July 2018	DF	(Italy) Carmine Setola	19	(Italy) Pisa	Free	End of loan	
1 July 2018	DF	(Albania) Shaqir Tafa	19	(Italy) Monopoli	Free	End of loan	
1 August 2018	FW	(Cyprus) Panagiotis Louka	17	(Italy) Atalanta	Free	On loan until 24 January 2019	
1 August 2018	GK	(Italy) Lorenzo Avogadri	16	(Italy) Atalanta	Free	On loan until 30 June 2019	

==== Other disposals ====
Date	Pos.	Player	Age	Moving to	Fee	Notes	Source
30 June 2018	MF	(Italy) Dario Giacomarro	23	Unattached	—N/a	Contract expiration	
30 June 2018	FW	(Italy) Vincenzo Plescia	20	Unattached	—N/a	Contract expiration	
17 July 2018	MF	(Italy) Danilo Ambro	19	(Italy) FeralpiSalò	Free	On loan until 30 June 2019	
19 July 2018	DF	(Italy) Simone Giuliano	21	(Italy) Pro Piacenza	Free	On loan until 30 June 2019	
24 July 2018	DF	(Italy) Giuseppe Tarantino	19	(Italy) Gravina	Free	On loan until 30 June 2019	
25 July 2018	DF	(Italy) Carmine Setola	19	(Italy) Fano	Free	On loan until 30 June 2019	
31 July 2018	GK	(Italy) Graziano Belladonna	18	(Italy) Lecco	Free	On loan until 30 June 2019	
1 August 2018	GK	(Italy) Samuele Guddo	19	(Italy) Latina	Free	On loan until 30 June 2019	
4 August 2018	FW	(Italy) Cosimo Marco Da Graca	16	(Italy) Juventus Youth Sector	Free	On loan until 30 June 2019 with an option to buy	
7 August 2018	DF	(Albania) Shaqir Tafa	19	(Italy) Cuneo	Free	On loan until 30 June 2019	
8 August 2018	MF	(Italy) Davide Petermann	23	(Italy) Reggina	Undisclosed	Permanent deal	
9 August 2018	MF	(Italy) Marco Toscano	21	(Italy) Trapani	Free	On loan until 30 June 2019	
16 August 2018	DF	(Italy) Ivo Quaranta	17	(Italy) Foggia	Free	On loan until 30 June 2019 with an option to buy and counter-option	

=== Post-summer transfers ===
Date	Pos.	Player	Age	Moving to	Fee	Notes	Source
21 August 2018	FW	(Hungary) Norbert Balogh	22	(Cyprus) APOEL	Free	On loan until 30 June 2019	
25 August 2018	GK	(Italy) Leonardo Marson	20	(Italy) Olbia	Undisclosed	Permanent deal	
30 August 2018	DF	(Belgium) Corentin Fiore	23	(Italy) Imolese	Free	On loan until 30 June 2019	

==== Other post-summer disposals ====
Date	Pos.	Player	Age	Moving to	Fee	Notes	Source
22 August 2018	DF	(Italy) Rosario Damiano Maddaloni	20	(Italy) Rende	Free	On loan until 30 June 2019 with an option to buy and counter-option	
24 August 2018	FW	(Italy) Accursio Bentivegna	22	(Italy) Carrarese	Undisclosed	Permanent deal	
24 August 2018	FW	(Italy) Paolo Grillo	21	(Italy) Pro Vercelli	Undisclosed	Permanent deal	
31 August 2018	DF	(Italy) Andrea Punzi	21	(Italy) Paganese	Free	On loan until 30 June 2019	
8 September 2018	DF	(Italy) Davide Monteleone	22	(Italy) Darfo Boario	Free	On loan until 30 June 2019	

=== Pre-winter transfers ===
Date	Pos.	Player	Age	Moving to	Fee	Notes	Source
24 December 2018	DF	(Slovenia) Aljaž Struna	28	(United States) Houston Dynamo	€500,000	Permanent deal	

==== Other pre-winter disposals ====
Date	Pos.	Player	Age	Moving to	Fee	Notes	Source
1 December 2018	MF	(Tunisia) Housem Ferchichi	22	(Italy) Este	Free	Unknown	
7 December 2018	FW	(Italy) Francesco Bonfiglio	21	(Italy) Marsala	Free	Released	

=== Winter 2019 ===
==== Out ====
Date	Pos.	Player	Age	Moving to	Fee	Notes	Source
25 January 2019	FW	(Guinea-Bissau) Carlos Embalo	24	(Italy) Cosenza	Free	On loan until 30 June 2019	

==== Other acquisitions ====
Date	Pos.	Player	Age	Moving from	Fee	Notes	Source
3 January 2019	DF	(Italy) Simone Giuliano	21	(Italy) Pro Piacenza	Free	Released due to economic crisis of Pro Piacenza	

==== Other disposals ====
Date	Pos.	Player	Age	Moving to	Fee	Notes	Source
24 January 2019	FW	(Cyprus) Panagiotis Louka	18	(Italy) Atalanta	Free	End of loan	

=== Post-winter transfers ===
Date	Pos.	Player	Age	Moving from	Fee	Notes	Source
1 March 2019	DF	(Norway) Niklas Gunnarsson	27	Unattached	Free	Until 30 June 2020	

Total expenditure: €2,000,000

Total revenue: €16,000,000

Net income: ▲€14,000,000

== Pre-season and friendlies ==
21 July 2018 Friendly	Palermo (Italy)	20–0	(Italy) R.L. Sappada	Sappada (Udine)
16:30 CEST (UTC+02:00)	Mina 15' (o.g.); Nestorovski 17', 21', 25', 36'; Trajkovski 22'; Pirrello 31'; Accardi 33'; Moreo 42'; Embalo 46', 74', 86'; Lo Faso 49'; Balogh 53', 66', 81'; Gnahoré 69', 87'; Rispoli 71', 90'	Report		Stadium: Sappada local stadium Referee: Marco Cecchin

27 July 2018 Friendly	Palermo (Italy)	6–1	(Italy) Sandonà 1922	Sappada (Udine)
16:30 CEST (UTC+02:00)	Fiordilino 3', 30'; Trajkovski 20', 34'; Nestorovski 27'; Santoro 62'	Report	44' Ferrarese	Stadium: Sappada local stadium Referee: Bogdan Nicolae Sfira

== Competitions ==
=== Overall ===
Competition	First match	Last match	Starting round	Final position	Record							
Competition	First match	Last match	Starting round	Final position	Pld	W	D	L	GF	GA	GD	Win %
Serie B	25 August 2018	11 May 2019	Matchday 1	11th place (Note: Palermo originally finished 3rd, but were deducted 20 points for administrative offense.)	36	16	15	5	57	38	+19	44.44
Coppa Italia	5 August 2018	12 August 2018	Second round	Third round	2	0	1	1	3	4	−1	0.00
Total					38	16	16	6	60	42	+18	42.11

Source: Competitions

=== Serie B ===
==== League table ====
Pos	Team	Pld	W	D	L	GF	GA	GD	Pts	Promotion, qualification or relegation
9	Cremonese	36	12	13	11	37	33	+4	49	
10	Cosenza	36	11	13	12	34	42	−8	46	
11	Palermo (Note: Palermo were initially deducted twenty points for financial irregularities, they were excluded from the 2019–20 Serie B on 12th July 2019.) (R, E, R)	36	16	15	5	57	38	+19	43 (Note: Positions determined by head-to-head points: Palermo: 9 pts; Crotone: 6 pts; Ascoli 3 pts.)	Phoenix in Serie D
12	Crotone	36	11	10	15	40	42	−2	43	
13	Ascoli	36	10	13	13	40	56	−16	43	

Source: Lega Serie B
Rules for classification: 1) Points; 2) Head-to-head points; 3) Head-to-head goal difference; 4) Goal difference; 5) Goals scored; 6) Draw.
(E) Eliminated; (R) Relegated

==== Results summary ====
Overall								Home						Away					
Pld	W	D	L	GF	GA	GD	Pts	W	D	L	GF	GA	GD	W	D	L	GF	GA	GD
36	16	15	5	57	38	+19	63	8	9	1	31	16	+15	8	6	4	26	22	+4

Source: Competitive matches

==== Results by round ====
Round	1	2	3	4	5	6	7	8	9	10	11	12	13	14	15	16	17	18	19	20	21	22	23	24	25	26	27	28	29	30	31	32	33	34	35	36	37	38
Ground	A	H	A	H	A	-	H	A	H	A	H	H	A	H	A	H	A	H	A	H	A	H	A	H	-	A	H	A	H	A	A	H	A	H	A	H	A	H
Result	D	D	W	W	L	B	W	W	D	W	W	W	D	D	W	D	D	W	W	L	L	D	W	D	B	L	W	D	W	D	L	W	W	D	D	D	W	D
Position	13	10	6	3	7	9	5	3	4	2	2	1	1	1	1	1	1	1	1	1	1	2	2	2	2	3	2	2	2	3	3	3	3	3	3	3	3	11

Source: Competitive matches
A = Away; H = Home; B = Bye; W = Win; D = Draw; L = Loss

=== Matches ===
==== Serie B ====
25 August 2018 1	Salernitana	0–0	Palermo	Salerno
18:00 CEST (UTC+02:00)	Pucino (yellow card) 28'; Di Tacchio (yellow card) 58'	Report	(yellow card) 61' Murawski; (yellow card) 88' Bellusci	Stadium: Arechi; Attendance: 12,979; Referee: Eugenio Abbattista

31 August 2018 2	Palermo	2–2	Cremonese	Palermo
21:00 CEST (UTC+02:00)	Trajkovski 26'; Haas (yellow card) 63'; Bellusci (yellow card) 77'; Mazzotta 88' (yellow card) 89'	Report	64' Strefezza; 82' Mogos	Stadium: Renzo Barbera; Attendance: 5,779; Referee: Luigi Nasca

16 September 2018 3	Foggia	1–2	Palermo	Foggia
21:00 CEST (UTC+02:00)	Deli (yellow card) 10'; Kragl 37'; Tonucci (yellow card) 68'; Camporese (yellow card) 80'	Report	(yellow card) 12' Bellusci; 54' Salvi; (yellow card) 55' Falletti; 64' Trajkovski; (yellow card) 85' Murawski	Stadium: Pino Zaccheria; Attendance: 10,778; Referee: Livio Marinelli

22 September 2018 4	Palermo	4–1	Perugia	Palermo
15:00 CEST (UTC+02:00)	Bellusci 14'; Jajalo (yellow card) 20'; Nestorovski 18', 68' (pen.); Trajkovski 58'	Report	(yellow card) 23' Moscati; (yellow card) 40' Gyömbér; 79' Dragomir	Stadium: Renzo Barbera; Attendance: 5,313; Referee: Francesco Fourneau

25 September 2018 5	Brescia	2–1	Palermo	Brescia
21:00 CEST (UTC+02:00)	Donnarumma 27', 29'; Torregrossa (yellow card) 40'; Ndoj (yellow card) 51'; Tonali (yellow card) 90+3'	Report	(yellow card) 77' Aleesami; 86' Moreo	Stadium: Mario Rigamonti; Attendance: 6,103; Referee: Marco Piccinini

Bye 6	v

7 October 2018 7	Palermo	1–0	Crotone	Palermo
21:00 CEST (UTC+02:00)	Rajković (yellow card) 17'; Bellusci, Trajkovski (yellow card) 41'; Nestorovski 86'	Report	(yellow card) 2' Budimir	Stadium: Renzo Barbera; Attendance: 6,011; Referee: Davide Ghersini

21 October 2018 8	Lecce	1–2	Palermo	Lecce
21:00 CEST (UTC+02:00)	Tabanelli 37'; La Mantia (yellow card) 65'	Report	29' (yellow card) 86' Nestorovski; (yellow card) 51' Mazzotta; (yellow card) 52' Jajalo; 85' Pușcaș; (yellow card) 88' Brignoli	Stadium: Via del Mare; Attendance: 12,719; Referee: Manuel Volpi

26 October 2018 9	Palermo	1–1	Venezia	Palermo
21:00 CEST (UTC+02:00)	Salvi (yellow card) 9'; Nestorovski (yellow card) 60'; Trajkovski (red card) 63'; Bellusci (yellow card) 65'; Struna (yellow card) 87' (goal) 90'	Report	59' Segre; (yellow card) 65'Litteri; (yellow card) 89' Di Mariano	Stadium: Renzo Barbera; Attendance: 6,067; Referee: Ivano Pezzuto

30 October 2018 10	Carpi	0–3	Palermo	Carpi
21:00 CET (UTC+01:00)	Sabbione (yellow card) 25'; Pezzi (yellow card) 39' (yellow-red card) 45+1'	Report	5' Falletti; (yellow card) 27' Rajković; (yellow card) 47' (goal) 61' Jajalo; (yellow card) 49' Pirrello; (red card) 66' Rispoli; 74' Nestorovski	Stadium: Sandro Cabassi; Attendance: 1,875; Referee: Niccolò Baroni

3 November 2018 11	Palermo	2–1	Cosenza	Palermo
15:00 CET (UTC+01:00)	Murawski (yellow card) 8'; Bellusci (yellow card) 35'; Jajalo (yellow card) 67'; Salvi 77'; Pușcaș 90'; Struna (yellow card) 90+6'	Report	(yellow card) 15' Mungo; (yellow card) 73' Garritano; 79' Baclet; (yellow card) 90+6' Pascali; (red card) 90+7' Idda	Stadium: Renzo Barbera; Attendance: 4,513; Referee: Lorenzo Illuzzi

11 November 2018 12	Palermo	3–0	Pescara	Palermo
21:00 CET (UTC+01:00)	Pușcaș 37' (yellow card) 57'; Murawski 86'; Moreo 87'; Struna (yellow card) 90+2'	Report	(yellow card) 43' Mancuso; (yellow card) 89' Pepín	Stadium: Renzo Barbera; Attendance: 9,222; Referee: Livio Marinelli

23 November 2018 13	Hellas Verona	1–1	Palermo	Verona
21:00 CET (UTC+01:00)	Di Carmine 31'; Lee (yellow card) 59'	Report	(yellow card) 9' Bellusci; 67' Rajković	Stadium: Marc'Antonio Bentegodi; Attendance: 8,258; Referee: Aleandro Di Paolo

30 November 2018 14	Palermo	0–0	Benevento	Palermo
21:00 CET (UTC+01:00)	Jajalo (yellow card) 26'; Rajković (yellow card) 56'; Salvi (yellow card) 72'	Report	(yellow card) 63' Billong; (yellow card) 81' Maggio	Stadium: Renzo Barbera; Attendance: 7,714; Referee: Eugenio Abbattista

8 December 2018 15	Padova	1–3	Palermo	Padua
12:30 CET (UTC+01:00)	Bonazzoli 30'; Clemenza (yellow card) 38'; Cappelletti (yellow card) 45'; Belingheri (yellow card) 90'	Report	43' Trajkovski; (yellow card) 65' Haas; (yellow card) 66' Moreo; 68' Rajković; 70' Nestorovski; (yellow card) 72' Szymiński	Stadium: Euganeo; Attendance: 8,215; Referee: Federico Dionisi

15 December 2018 16	Palermo	1–1	Livorno	Palermo
15:00 CET (UTC+01:00)	Moreo 14'; Bellusci (yellow card) 77'; Falletti (yellow card) 78'	Report	25' Raičević; (yellow card) 57' Porcino; (yellow card) 59' Fazzi; (yellow card) 80' Agazzi	Stadium: Renzo Barbera; Attendance: 5,734; Referee: Valerio Marini

23 December 2018 17	Spezia	1–1	Palermo	La Spezia
17:30 CET (UTC+01:00)	Capradossi 34'; Gyasi (yellow card) 86'; De Col (yellow card) 90+4'	Report	25' Falletti; (yellow card) 38' Murawski; (yellow card) 59' Aleesami; (yellow card) 70' Salvi; (yellow card) 80' Bellusci	Stadium: Alberto Picco; Attendance: 5 609; Referee: Riccardo Ros

27 December 2018 18	Palermo	3–0	Ascoli	Palermo
21:00 CET (UTC+1:00)	Perucchini 26' (o.g.); Jajalo (yellow card) 58'; Čočev 73'; Szymiński 86'	Report	(yellow card) 68' Addae	Stadium: Renzo Barbera; Attendance: 8 262; Referee: Fabio Piscopo

30 December 2018 19	Cittadella	0–1	Palermo	Cittadella
15:00 CET (UTC+01:00)	Adorni (yellow card) 37'; Benedetti (yellow card) 54'	Report	51' Falletti; (yellow card) 83' Bellusci; (yellow card) 90+3' Fiordilino	Stadium: Piercesare Tombolato; Attendance: 4 815; Referee: Gianluca Aureliano

18 January 2019 20	Palermo	1–2	Salernitana	Palermo
21:00 CET (UTC+01:00)	Jajalo 17' (yellow card) 70'; Pirrello (yellow card) 59'; Chochev (yellow card) 79'	Report	41' André Anderson; (yellow card) 55' Migliorini; (yellow card) 83' Di Tacchio; 90+3' Casasola	Stadium: Renzo Barbera; Attendance: 6,674; Referee: Federico Dionisi

26 January 2019 21	Cremonese	2–0	Palermo	Cremona
15:00 CET (UTC+01:00)	Arini 45+3'; Boultam (yellow card) 63'; Migliore 70'	Report	(yellow card) 26' Chochev; (yellow card) 33' Bellusci	Stadium: Giovanni Zini; Attendance: 7,007; Referee: Livio Marinelli

4 February 2019 22	Palermo	0–0	Foggia	Palermo
21:00 CET (UTC+01:00)	Salvi (yellow card) 32'; Murawski (yellow card) 40'; Falletti (yellow card) 62'	Report	(yellow card) 25' Gerbo	Stadium: Renzo Barbera; Attendance: 4,617; Referee: Davide Ghersini

9 February 2019 23	Perugia	1–2	Palermo	Perugia
15:00 CET (UTC+01:00)	Bianco (yellow card) 40'; Sadiq (yellow card) 66'; Melchiorri 89'; Verre (yellow card) 90+3'	Report	2', 47' Pușcaș; (yellow card) 28' Haas; (yellow card) 62' Bellusci	Stadium: Renato Curi; Attendance: 8,105; Referee: Marco Serra

15 February 2019 24	Palermo	1–1	Brescia	Palermo
21:00 CET (UTC+01:00)	Falletti (yellow card) 19'; Rispoli (yellow card) 64'; Nestorovski 79'	Report	(yellow card) 8' Torregrossa; (yellow card) 71' Ndoj; (yellow card) 82' Sabelli; 90+2' (yellow card) 90+3' Tremolada	Stadium: Renzo Barbera; Attendance: 22,329; Referee: Juan Luca Sacchi

Bye 25	v

26 February 2019 26	Crotone	3–0	Palermo	Crotone
21:00 CET (UTC+01:00)	Rohdén 28'; Curado (yellow card) 69'; Mráz 78'; Simy 90+2' (pen.)	Report	(yellow card) 55' Moreo; (yellow card) 72' Szymiński; (yellow card) 90+1' Bellusci	Stadium: Ezio Scida; Attendance: 6,104; Referee: Eugenio Abbattista

2 March 2019 27	Palermo	2–1	Lecce	Palermo
18:00 CET (UTC+01:00)	Trajkovski 4'; Nestorovski (yellow card) 38'; Pușcaș 52'; Salvi (yellow card) 66'; Brignoli 84'	Report	(yellow card) 22' Lucioni; (yellow card) 45+1' Mancosu; (yellow card) 55' Meccariello; 90+3' Tabanelli	Stadium: Renzo Barbera; Attendance: 9,899; Referee: Gianluca Aureliano

11 March 2019 28	Venezia	1–1	Palermo	Venice
21:00 CET (UTC+01:00)	Bocalon 39' (yellow card) 40'	Report	(yellow card) 43' Bellusci; 84' Pușcaș	Stadium: Pier Luigi Penzo; Attendance: 3,154; Referee: Riccardo Ros

17 March 2019 29	Palermo	4–1	Carpi	Palermo
15:00 CET (UTC+01:00)	Falletti 11'; Nestorovski 15', 87'; Rajković (yellow card) 63'; Fiordilino (yellow card) 79'; Pușcaș 85'	Report	(yellow card) 44' (yellow-red card) 82' Krešić; 46' Mustacchio; (yellow card) 55' Jelenič; (yellow card) 67' Di Noia; (yellow card) 69' (red card) 69' Pasciuti; (yellow card) 81' Vano	Stadium: Renzo Barbera; Attendance: 9,333; Referee: Luca Massimi

30 March 2019 30	Cosenza	1–1	Palermo	Cosenza
15:00 CET (UTC+01:00)	Dermaku (yellow card) 11'; Sciaudone 36' (yellow card) 88'	Report	19' (yellow card) 88' (yellow-red card) 90' Nestorovski; (yellow card) 28' Murawski; (yellow card) 35' Bellusci; (yellow card) 45+1' Moreo; (yellow card) 45+3' Jajalo; (yellow card) 52' Rajković	Stadium: San Vito-Gigi Marulla; Attendance: 9,268; Referee: Manuel Volpi

3 April 2019 31	Pescara	3–2	Palermo	Pescara
21:00 CEST (UTC+02:00)	Del Grosso 6'; Monachello (yellow card) 31'; Memushaj 68'; Scognamiglio 86' (yellow card) 89'; Mancuso (yellow card) 88'	Report	15' Moreo; 37' (yellow card) 40' Pirrello; (yellow card) 45+3' Jajalo; (yellow card) 76' Murawski	Stadium: Adriatico-Giovanni Cornacchia; Attendance: 6,557; Referee: Luigi Nasca

8 April 2019 32	Palermo	1–0	Hellas Verona	Palermo
21:00 CEST (UTC+02:00)	Murawski (yellow card) 29'; Nestorovski 46' (yellow card) 80'; Bellusci (yellow card) 82' (yellow-red card) 90'	Report	(yellow card) 64' Gustafson; (yellow card) 67' Pazzini; (yellow card) 90+3' Dawidowicz	Stadium: Renzo Barbera; Attendance: 10,377; Referee: Antonio Giua

14 April 2019 33	Benevento	1–2	Palermo	Benevento
21:00 CEST (UTC+02:00)	Caldirola (yellow card) 66'; Bandinelli (yellow card) 73'; Asencio 89'	Report	42' Nestorovski; (yellow card) 53' Haas; (yellow card) 61' Jajalo; (yellow card) 74' Rajković; (yellow card) 77' Salvi; 81' Pușcaș; (yellow card) 90+3' Moreo	Stadium: Ciro Vigorito; Attendance: 10,861; Referee: Davide Ghersini

22 April 2019 34	Palermo	1–1	Padova	Palermo
21:00 CEST (UTC+02:00)	Trajkovski 14'; Salvi (yellow card) 30'; Haas (yellow card) 68'; Pușcaș (yellow card) 90+3'	Report	15' Pulzetti; (yellow card) 35' Baraye; (yellow card) 41' Trevisan; (yellow card) 82' Lollo	Stadium: Renzo Barbera; Attendance: 11,639; Referee: Lorenzo Illuzzi

27 April 2019 35	Livorno	2–2	Palermo	Livorno
15:00 CEST (UTC+02:00)	Gonnelli (yellow card) 45+2'; Gori (yellow card) 47'; Diamanti 73'; Raičević 82'	Report	41' (pen.) Nestorovski; (yellow card) 52' Jajalo; 89' Trajkovski; (red card) 90+2' Bellusci	Stadium: Armando Picchi; Attendance: 6,541; Referee: Aleandro Di Paolo

1 May 2019 36	Palermo	2–2	Spezia	Palermo
12:30 CEST (UTC+02:00)	Jajalo 32'; Moreo 40'; Haas (yellow card) 61'; Rajković (yellow card) 70'; Murawski (yellow card) 83'	Report	30', 44' Maggiore; (yellow card) 72' Mora	Stadium: Renzo Barbera; Attendance: 7,250; Referee: Antonio Rapuano

4 May 2019 37	Ascoli	1–2	Palermo	Ascoli Piceno
15:00 CEST (UTC+02:00)	Addae 63'; Casarini (yellow card) 80'	Report	60' (yellow card) 65' Moreo; (yellow card) 73' Rajković; (yellow card) 76' Jajalo; (yellow card) 85' Szymiński; 86' Haas	Stadium: Cino e Lillo Del Duca; Attendance: 6,541; Referee: Francesco Fourneau

11 May 2019 38	Palermo	2–2	Cittadella	Palermo
15:00 CEST (UTC+02:00)	Nestorovski 21'; Trajkovski 23'	Report	(yellow card) 50' Frare; 65' Diaw; 82' Adorni	Stadium: Renzo Barbera; Attendance: 28,351; Referee: Juan Luca Sacchi

==== Coppa Italia ====
5 August 2018 Second round	Palermo	2–2 (a.e.t.) (6–5 p)	Vicenza	Palermo
20:30 CET (UTC+02:00)	Salvi (yellow card) 57'; Jajalo (yellow card) 62'; Haas (yellow card) 90+1'; Rajković 90+4', 117'	Report	(yellow card) 51' Bianchi; (yellow card) 55' (goal) 90+2' (pen.) Giacomelli; 100' Tronco	Stadium: Renzo Barbera; Attendance: 5,766; Referee: Francesco Fourneau
	Penalties
	Nestorovski (penalty missed); Trajkovski (penalty scored); Embalo (penalty scored); Rajković (penalty scored); Salvi (penalty scored); Fiore (penalty scored); Bellusci (penalty scored)		(penalty scored) Giacomelli; (penalty scored) Tronco; (penalty missed) Gashi; (penalty scored) Bonetto; (penalty scored) Zonta; (penalty scored) Grandi; (penalty missed) Stevanin

12 August 2018 Third round	Cagliari	2–1	Palermo	Cagliari
20:30 CET (UTC+02:00)	Pavoletti 31', 73'; Cigarini (yellow card) 42'	Report	(yellow card) 38' Rajković; 52' (pen.) Nestorovski; (yellow card) 64' Murawski	Stadium: Sardegna Arena; Attendance: 10,201; Referee: Paolo Valeri

=== Appearances and goals ===
As of 11 May 2019

No.	Pos	Nat	Player	Total		Serie B		Coppa Italia	
No.	Pos	Nat	Player	Apps	Goals	Apps	Goals	Apps	Goals
Goalkeepers
1/32	GK	(Italy) ITA	Alberto Brignoli	33	-35	31	-31	2	-4
1/33	GK	(Italy) ITA	Fabrizio Alastra	0	0	0	0	0	0
12	GK	(Italy) ITA	Lorenzo Avogadri	0	0	0	0	0	0
12	GK	(Italy) ITA	Leonardo Marson	0	0	0	0	0	0
22	GK	(Italy) ITA	Alberto Pomini	5	-7	5	-7	0	0
Defenders
2	DF	(Italy) ITA	Giuseppe Bellusci	32	1	30	1	2	0
3	DF	(Italy) ITA	Andrea Rispoli	22	0	22	0	0	0
4	DF	(Italy) ITA	Andrea Accardi	1	0	1	0	0	0
5	DF	(Serbia) SRB	Slobodan Rajković	32	4	30	2	2	2
6	DF	(Norway) NOR	Niklas Gunnarsson	0	0	0	0	0	0
6	DF	(Slovenia) SLO	Aljaž Struna	5	1	5	1	0	0
13	DF	(Italy) ITA	Andrea Ingegneri	0	0	0	0	0	0
14	DF	(Italy) ITA	Alessandro Salvi	23	2	21	2	2	0
19	DF	(Norway) NOR	Haitam Aleesami	29	0	29	0	0	0
23	DF	(Belgium) BEL	Corentin Fiore	1	0	0	0	1	0
24	DF	(Poland) POL	Przemysław Szymiński	20	1	20	1	0	0
27	DF	(Italy) ITA	Antonio Mazzotta	13	1	11	1	2	0
31	DF	(Italy) ITA	Roberto Pirrello	9	1	9	1	0	0
Midfielders
8	MF	(Bosnia and Herzegovina) BIH	Mato Jajalo	35	3	33	3	2	0
18	MF	(Bulgaria) BUL	Ivaylo Chochev	12	1	12	1	0	0
21	MF	(Italy) ITA	Luca Fiordilino	18	0	16	0	2	0
25/33	MF	(Italy) ITA	Antonino Gallo	0	0	0	0	0	0
26	MF	(Italy) ITA	Simone Santoro	0	0	0	0	0	0
28/32	MF	(Switzerland) SUI	Nicolas Haas	33	1	32	1	1	0
35	MF	(Poland) POL	Radosław Murawski	34	1	32	1	2	0
Forwards
7/10	FW	(North Macedonia) MKD	Aleksandar Trajkovski	36	8	34	8	2	0
7/15	FW	(Italy) ITA	Simone Lo Faso	2	0	2	0	0	0
9	FW	(Italy) ITA	Stefano Moreo	33	6	31	6	2	0
11	FW	(Guinea-Bissau) GBS	Carlos Embalo	6	0	4	0	2	0
17	FW	(Hungary) HUN	Norbert Balogh	2	0	0	0	2	0
20	FW	(Uruguay) URU	César Falletti	32	4	32	4	0	0
29	FW	(Romania) ROU	George Pușcaș	33	9	33	9	0	0
30	FW	(North Macedonia) MKD	Ilija Nestorovski	28	15	26	14	2	1
34	FW	(Italy) ITA	Kevin Cannavò	2	0	2	0	0	0

=== Goalscorers ===
As of 11 May 2019

Rank	No.	Pos	Nat	Name	Serie B	Coppa Italia	Total
1	30	FW	(North Macedonia)	Ilija Nestorovski	14	1	15
2	29	FW	(Romania)	George Pușcaș	9		9
3	7/10	FW	(North Macedonia)	Aleksandar Trajkovski	8		8
4	9	FW	(Italy)	Stefano Moreo	6		6
5	20	FW	(Uruguay)	César Falletti	4		4
5	5	DF	(Serbia)	Slobodan Rajković	2	2	4
7	8	MF	(Bosnia and Herzegovina)	Mato Jajalo	3		3
8	14	DF	(Italy)	Alessandro Salvi	2		2
9	2	DF	(Italy)	Giuseppe Bellusci	1		1
9	18	MF	(Bulgaria)	Ivaylo Chochev	1		1
9	32	MF	(Switzerland)	Nicolas Haas	1		1
9	27	DF	(Italy)	Antonio Mazzotta	1		1
9	35	MF	(Poland)	Radosław Murawski	1		1
9	31	DF	(Italy)	Roberto Pirrello	1		1
9	6	DF	(Slovenia)	Aljaž Struna	1		1
9	24	DF	(Poland)	Przemysław Szymiński	1		1
Own goal					1		1
Totals					57	3	60

=== Clean sheets ===
As of 11 May 2019

Rank	No.	Pos	Nat	Name	Serie B	Coppa Italia	Total
1	1/32	GK	(Italy)	Alberto Brignoli	7 (Note: Weeks: 1, 7, 12, 14, 18, 22, 32.)		7
2	22	GK	(Italy)	Alberto Pomini	2 (Note: Weeks: 10, 19.)		2
Totals					9	0	9

=== Disciplinary record ===
As of 11 May 2019

No.	Pos	Nat	Name	Serie B			Coppa Italia			Total		
No.	Pos	Nat	Name	Yellow card	(yellow card) (yellow-red card)	Red card	Yellow card	(yellow card) (yellow-red card)	Red card	Yellow card	(yellow card) (yellow-red card)	Red card
2	DF	(Italy)	Giuseppe Bellusci	15	1	1				15	1	1
3	DF	(Italy)	Andrea Rispoli	1		1				1		1
7/10	FW	(North Macedonia)	Aleksandar Trajkovski	1		1				1		1
30	FW	(North Macedonia)	Ilija Nestorovski	4	1					4	1	
8	MF	(Bosnia and Herzegovina)	Mato Jajalo	12			1			13		
35	MF	(Poland)	Radosław Murawski	9			1			10		
5	DF	(Serbia)	Slobodan Rajković	8			1			9		
14	DF	(Italy)	Alessandro Salvi	7			1			8		
28/32	MF	(Switzerland)	Nicolas Haas	6			1			7		
9	FW	(Italy)	Stefano Moreo	5						5		
20	FW	(Uruguay)	César Falletti	4						4		
31	DF	(Italy)	Roberto Pirrello	3						3		
6	DF	(Slovenia)	Aljaž Struna	3						3		
24	DF	(Poland)	Przemysław Szymiński	3						3		
19	DF	(Norway)	Haitam Aleesami	2						2		
1/32	GK	(Italy)	Alberto Brignoli	2						2		
18	MF	(Bulgaria)	Ivaylo Chochev	2						2		
21	MF	(Italy)	Luca Fiordilino	2						2		
27	DF	(Italy)	Antonio Mazzotta	2						2		
29	FW	(Romania)	George Pușcaș	2						2		
Totals				93	2	3	5	0	0	98	2	3

=== Attendances ===
As of 11 May 2019.

	Matches	Attendances	Average	High	Low
Serie B	18	169,084	9,394	28,351	4,513
Coppa Italia	1	5,766	5,766	5,766	5,766
Total	19	174,850	9,203	28,351	4,513
