= 2016–17 US Città di Palermo season =

Palermo
2016–17 season
- President: Maurizio Zamparini (until 27 February 2017); Paul Baccaglini (from 6 March 2017)
- Manager: Davide Ballardini (until 6 September 2016); Roberto De Zerbi (from 6 September 2016 to 30 November 2016); Eugenio Corini (from 30 November 2016 to 24 January 2017); Diego López (from 26 January 2017 to 11 April 2017); Diego Bortoluzzi (from 11 April 2017)
- Stadium: Stadio Renzo Barbera
- Serie A: 19th (relegated)
- Coppa Italia: Fourth round
- Top goalscorer: League: Ilija Nestorovski (11); All: Ilija Nestorovski (11)
- Highest home attendance: 27,039 vs Juventus (24 September 2016, Serie A)
- Lowest home attendance: 4,629 vs Spezia (30 November 2016, Coppa Italia)
- Average home league attendance: 13,204
Home colours	Away colours	Third colours

The 2016–17 season was Unione Sportiva Città di Palermo's third consecutive season in the top-flight of Italian football. Palermo competed in Serie A and the Coppa Italia. Palermo finished the league season in 19th place and were relegated to Serie B.

== Squad information ==
Players and squad numbers last updated on 31 January 2017.
Appearances and goals are counted for domestic leagues (Serie A and Serie B) and national cup (Coppa Italia) and correct as of 28 May 2017.
Note: Flags indicate national team as has been defined under FIFA eligibility rules. Players may hold more than one non-FIFA nationality.

No.	Name	Nat	Position(s)	Date of birth (age)	Signed in	Contract ends	Signed from	Transfer Fee	Apps.	Goals
Goalkeepers
1	Josip Posavec	(Croatia)	GK	10 March 1996 (age 30)	2016	2020	(Croatia) Inter Zaprešić	€500,000	31	-63
55	Leonardo Marson	(Italy)	GK	5 January 1998 (age 28)	2016	2020	(Italy) Youth Sector	N/A	-	-
68	Andrea Fulignati	(Italy)	GK	31 October 1994 (age 31)	2013	2018	(Italy) Sestese	Undisclosed	10	-14
Defenders
2	Roberto Vitiello (C)	(Italy)	RB / CB	8 May 1983 (age 43)	2014	2017	Unattached	Free	45	1
3	Andrea Rispoli	(Italy)	RB / RWB	29 September 1988 (age 37)	2015	2019	(Italy) Parma	Free	72	6
4	Siniša Anđelković	(Slovenia)	CB	13 February 1986 (age 40)	2011	2017	(Slovenia) Maribor	€1.2M	124	1
5	Slobodan Rajković	(Serbia)	CB	3 February 1989 (age 37)	2016	2020	(Germany) Darmstadt	€1.5M	5	0
6	Edoardo Goldaniga	(Italy)	CB	2 November 1993 (age 32)	2013	2019	(Italy) Youth Sector	N/A	47	4
7	Achraf Lazaar	(Morocco)	LB / LWB	22 January 1992 (age 34)	2014	2017	(Italy) Varese	€1M	76	3
12	Giancarlo González	(Costa Rica)	CB	8 February 1988 (age 38)	2014	2018	(United States) Columbus Crew	€3.8M	83	4
15	Thiago Cionek	(Poland)	CB / RB	21 April 1986 (age 40)	2016	2018	(Italy) Modena	€350,000	53	1
19	Haitam Aleesami	(Norway)	LB / RWB	31 July 1991 (age 35)	2016	2019	(Sweden) Göteborg	€1.2M	33	1
56	Andrea Punzi	(Italy)	CB	2 March 1997 (age 29)	2016		(Italy) Youth Sector	N/A	-	-
70	Simone Giuliano	(Italy)	CB / RB / LWB	28 April 1997 (age 29)	2016	2019	(Italy) Youth Sector	N/A	-	-
89	Michel Morganella	(Switzerland)	RB / RWB	17 May 1989 (age 37)	2009	2018	(Switzerland) Basel	€2M	96	2
97	Giuseppe Pezzella	(Italy)	LB / LWB / RB	29 November 1997 (age 28)	2015	2018	(Italy) Youth Sector	N/A	21	0
Midfielders
10	Oscar Hiljemark	(Sweden)	CM / DM / AM	28 June 1992 (age 34)	2015	2019	(Netherlands) PSV Eindhoven	€2.5M	55	4
14	Alessandro Gazzi	(Italy)	DM / CM	28 January 1983 (age 43)	2016	2018	(Italy) Torino	€700,000	28	0
18	Ivaylo Chochev	(Bulgaria)	CM	18 February 1993 (age 33)	2014	2020	(Bulgaria) CSKA Sofia	€2M	77	7
21	Robin Quaison	(Sweden)	AM / SS / LW	8 October 1993 (age 32)	2014	2017	(Sweden) AIK	€2M	70	8
24	Ouasim Bouy (Note: On loan.)	(Netherlands)	DM / CM / CB	11 June 1993 (age 33)	2016	2017	(Italy) Juventus	Free	3	0
25	Bruno Henrique	(Brazil)	CM / DM	21 October 1989 (age 36)	2016	2020	(Brazil) Corinthians	€3.3M	33	1
28	Mato Jajalo	(Bosnia and Herzegovina)	CM / DM	25 May 1988 (age 38)	2015	2019	(Croatia) Rijeka	Free	71	2
Forwards
8	Aleksandar Trajkovski	(North Macedonia)	SS / AM / CF	5 September 1992 (age 34)	2015	2020	(Belgium) Zulte Waregem	€900,000	44	5
11	Carlos Embaló	(Guinea-Bissau)	LW	25 November 1994 (age 31)	2013	2020	(Portugal) Chaves	€195,000	12	0
20	Roland Sallai	(Hungary)	LW / RW / AM	22 May 1997 (age 29)	2016	2017	(Hungary) Puskás Akadémia	Free	22	1
22	Norbert Balogh	(Hungary)	CF	21 February 1996 (age 30)	2016	2020	(Hungary) Debreceni	€2.2M	22	0
23	Alessandro Diamanti	(Italy)	SS / RW / AM	2 May 1983 (age 43)	2016	2018	(China) Guangzhou Evergrande	Free	32	1
27	Accursio Bentivegna	(Italy)	LW	21 June 1996 (age 30)	2014	2019	(Italy) Youth Sector	N/A	8	0
30	Ilija Nestorovski	(North Macedonia)	CF / SS	12 March 1990 (age 36)	2016	2021	(Croatia) Inter Zaprešić	€500,000	38	11
98	Simone Lo Faso	(Italy)	SS	18 February 1998 (age 28)	2016	2021	(Italy) Youth Sector	N/A	12	0
Players transferred in during the season
9	Stefan Silva	(Sweden)	CF	11 March 1990 (age 36)	2017	2021	(Sweden) Sundsvall	€800,000	1	0
44	Toni Šunjić	(Bosnia and Herzegovina)	CB	15 December 1988 (age 37)	2017	2017	(Germany) Stuttgart	Free	7	0
57	Samuele Guddo (Note: Aggregated from Youth Sector during the season.)	(Italy)	GK	2 July 1999 (age 27)	2017		(Italy) Youth Sector	N/A	-	-
58	Sebastian Breza (Note: Signed from Monopoli on summer 2016, transferred to own Youth Sector and then aggregated during the season.)	(Canada)	GK	15 March 1998 (age 28)	2016	2017	(Italy) Monopoli	Free	-	-
60	Francesco Bonfiglio	(Italy)	LW	20 January 1997 (age 29)	2017		(Italy) Youth Sector	N/A	-	-
61	Gennaro Ruggiero	(Italy)	CM	4 February 2000 (age 26)	2017		(Italy) Youth Sector	N/A	2	0

Name	Signed to	Transfer Fee	Notes
Players transferred out during the season
Achraf Lazaar	(England) Newcastle United	€2.85M	Permanent deal
Oscar Hiljemark	(Italy) Genoa	€300,000	Out on loan with an obligation to buy for €2.5M
Robin Quaison	(Germany) Mainz	€2.5M	Permanent deal
Ouasim Bouy	(Italy) Juventus	Free	End of loan

== Transfers ==
=== In ===
Date	Pos.	Player	Age	Moving from	Fee	Notes	Source
3 August 2016	MF	(Italy) Alessandro Gazzi	33	(Italy) Torino	€700,000		
8 August 2016	DF	(Norway) Haitam Aleesami	25	(Sweden) IFK Göteborg	€1,300,000		
29 August 2016	MF	(Italy) Alessandro Diamanti	33	(China) Guangzhou Evergrande	Loan		
29 August 2016	MF	(Brazil) Bruno Henrique	26	(Brazil) Corinthians	€3,300,000		

==== Loans in ====
Date	Pos.	Player	Age	Moving from	Fee	Notes	Source
26 August 2016	MF	(Netherlands) Ouasim Bouy	23	(Italy) Juventus		On loan until 2017	

=== Out ===
Date	Pos.	Player	Age	Moving to	Fee	Notes	Source
2 July 2016	GK	(Italy) Stefano Sorrentino	37	(Italy) Chievo	Free		
16 July 2016	MF	(Italy) Franco Vázquez	27	(Spain) Sevilla	€15,000,000		

==== Loans out ====
Date	Pos.	Player	Age	Moving to	Fee	Notes	Source
7 June 2016	FW	(Denmark) Simon Makienok	25	(England) Preston North End	Loan		
28 August 2016	DF	(Morocco) Achraf Lazaar	24	(England) Newcastle United	€3,300,000		

== Competitions ==
=== Overall ===
Competition	Started round	Current position	Final position	First match	Last match
Serie A	Matchday 1	—	19th	21 August 2016	28 May 2017
Coppa Italia	Third round	—	Fourth round	12 August 2016	30 November 2016

Last updated: 28 May 2017

=== Serie A ===
==== League table ====
Pos	Team	Pld	W	D	L	GF	GA	GD	Pts	Qualification or relegation
16	Genoa	38	9	9	20	38	64	−26	36	
17	Crotone	38	9	7	22	34	58	−24	34	
18	Empoli (R)	38	8	8	22	29	61	−32	32	Relegation to Serie B
19	Palermo (R)	38	6	8	24	33	77	−44	26	Relegation to Serie B
20	Pescara (R)	38	3	9	26	37	81	−44	18	Relegation to Serie B

Source: Serie A, Soccerway
Rules for classification: 1) Points; 2) Head-to-head points; 3) Head-to-head goal difference; 4) Goal difference; 5) Goals scored; 6) Draw.
(R) Relegated

==== Results summary ====
Overall								Home						Away					
Pld	W	D	L	GF	GA	GD	Pts	W	D	L	GF	GA	GD	W	D	L	GF	GA	GD
38	6	8	24	33	77	−44	26	4	3	12	13	30	−17	2	5	12	20	47	−27

Last updated: 28 May 2017.
Source: Competitive matches

==== Results by round ====
Round	1	2	3	4	5	6	7	8	9	10	11	12	13	14	15	16	17	18	19	20	21	22	23	24	25	26	27	28	29	30	31	32	33	34	35	36	37	38
Ground	H	A	H	A	A	H	A	H	A	H	A	H	A	H	A	H	A	H	A	A	H	A	H	H	A	H	A	H	A	H	A	H	A	H	A	H	A	A
Result	L	D	L	D	W	L	D	L	L	L	L	L	L	L	L	L	W	D	L	L	L	D	W	L	L	D	L	L	L	L	L	D	L	W	D	W	L	W
Position	17	15	19	19	16	18	18	18	19	19	19	19	19	20	20	20	19	18	18	18	19	19	18	18	18	18	18	18	18	19	19	19	19	19	19	19	19	19

Updated to match(es) played on 28 May 2017. Source: Competitive matches
A = Away; H = Home; W = Win; D = Draw; L = Loss

==== Matches ====
22 August 2016 1	Palermo	0–1	Sassuolo	Palermo
20:45 CEST (UTC+02:00)	Rajković (yellow card) 32' (yellow-red card) 90+1'; Quaison (yellow card) 80'	Report	Berardi 31' (pen.); Mazzitelli (yellow card) 41'; Consigli (yellow card) 90+3'	Stadium: Stadio Renzo Barbera; Attendance: 12,935; Referee: Luca Pairetto

28 August 2016 2	Internazionale	1–1	Palermo	Milan
18:00 CEST (UTC+02:00)	Icardi 72'; Murillo (yellow card) 76'	Report	Goldaniga (yellow card) 18'; Aleesami (yellow card) 39'; Rispoli 48', (yellow card) 86'; Gazzi (yellow card) 70'; Sallai (yellow card) 81'	Stadium: San Siro; Attendance: 40,527; Referee: Carmine Russo

10 September 2016 3	Palermo	0–3	Napoli	Palermo
20:45 CEST (UTC+02:00)		Report	Hamšík 47'; Callejón 51', 65'	Stadium: Stadio Renzo Barbera; Attendance: 10,961; Referee: Davide Massa

18 September 2016 4	Crotone	1–1	Palermo	Pescara
15:00 CEST (UTC+02:00)	Trotta 23'; Capezzi (yellow card) 45+2'; Crisetig (yellow card) 71'; Claiton (yellow card) 90'	Report	Nestorovski 66'; Goldaniga (yellow card) 81'; Anđelković (yellow card) 88'	Stadium: Stadio Adriatico – Giovanni Cornacchia; Attendance: 510; Referee: Domenico Celi

21 September 2016 5	Atalanta	0–1	Palermo	Bergamo
20:45 CEST (UTC+02:00)	Kessié (yellow card) 70'; Toloi (yellow card) 79'; Masiello (yellow card) 90+3'	Report	Diamanti (yellow card) 70'; Cionek (yellow card) 87'; Nestorovski 89'	Stadium: Stadio Atleti Azzurri d'Italia; Attendance: 14,094; Referee: Davide Ghersini

24 September 2016 6	Palermo	0–1	Juventus	Palermo
18:00 CEST (UTC+02:00)	Goldaniga (yellow card) 6'; González (yellow card) 20'; Aleesami (yellow card) 35'	Report	Bonucci (yellow card) 3'; Mandžukić (yellow card) 9'; Dani Alves (yellow card) 27'; Goldaniga 49' (o.g.)	Stadium: Stadio Renzo Barbera; Attendance: 27,039; Referee: Paolo Valeri

2 October 2016 7	Sampdoria	1–1	Palermo	Genoa
15:00 CEST (UTC+02:00)	Álvarez (yellow card) 21'; Viviano (yellow card) 60'; Fernandes 90+5'	Report	Hiljemark (yellow card) 28'; Gazzi (yellow card) 46' (yellow-red card) 90+2'; González (yellow card) 52'; Nestorovski 60', (yellow card) 61'; Diamanti (yellow card) 75'; Posavec (yellow card) 82'	Stadium: Stadio Luigi Ferraris; Attendance: 18,093; Referee: Maurizio Mariani

17 October 2016 8	Palermo	1–4	Torino	Palermo
20:45 CEST (UTC+02:00)	Chochev 5', (yellow card) 37'; Vitiello (yellow card) 33'; González (yellow card) 57'; Anđelković (yellow card) 69'	Report	Ljajić 25', 40', (yellow card) 41'; Benassi 45+1'; Baselli 50'; Boyé (yellow card) 80'	Stadium: Stadio Renzo Barbera; Attendance: 15,961; Referee: Michael Fabbri

23 October 2016 9	Roma	4–1	Palermo	Rome
20:45 CEST (UTC+02:00)	Manolas (yellow card) 27'; Salah 31', (yellow card) 84'; Juan Jesus (yellow card) 36'; Paredes 51'; Džeko 68'; El Shaarawy 82'	Report	Goldaniga (yellow card) 35'; Chochev (yellow card) 39'; Quaison 80'	Stadium: Stadio Olimpico; Attendance: 25,820; Referee: Gianpaolo Calvarese

27 October 2016 10	Palermo	1–3	Udinese	Palermo
20:45 CEST (UTC+02:00)	Nestorovski 10'; Diamanti (yellow card) 12'; Pezzella (yellow card) 16'; Sallai (yellow card) 75' (yellow-red card) 83'	Report	Felipe (yellow card) 18'; Théréau 36'; Widmer (yellow card) 57'; Fofana 74', 79'	Stadium: Stadio Renzo Barbera; Attendance: 9,360; Referee: Daniele Orsato

31 October 2016 11	Cagliari	2–1	Palermo	Cagliari
21:00 CET (UTC+01:00)	Sau (yellow card) 28'; Pisacane (yellow card) 33'; Dessena 53', 64'; Padoin (yellow card) 57'; Storari (yellow card) 78'; Barella (yellow card) 90+4'	Report	Rispoli (yellow card) 18'; Quaison (yellow card) 33'; Nestorovski 79'; Aleesami (yellow card) 90'	Stadium: Stadio Sant'Elia; Attendance: 14,625; Referee: Massimiliano Irrati

6 November 2016 12	Palermo	1–2	Milan	Palermo
15:00 CET (UTC+01:00)	Cionek (yellow card) 64'; Nestorovski 71'; Diamanti (yellow card) 89'	Report	Suso 15'; De Sciglio (yellow card) 26'; Lapadula 82'	Stadium: Stadio Renzo Barbera; Attendance: 13,545; Referee: Paolo Mazzoleni

20 November 2016 13	Bologna	3–1	Palermo	Bologna
15:00 CET (UTC+01:00)	Destro 20'; Gastaldello (yellow card) 45'; Džemaili 67'; Viviani 72'	Report	Nestorovski 9'; Cionek (yellow card) 30'	Stadium: Stadio Renato Dall'Ara; Attendance: 22,027; Referee: Carmine Russo

27 November 2016 14	Palermo	0–1	Lazio	Palermo
12:30 CET (UTC+01:00)	Goldaniga (yellow card) 41'; Diamanti (yellow card) 42'; Bouy (yellow card) 75'; González (red card) 86'	Report	Lulić (yellow card) 14'; Milinković-Savić 31'	Stadium: Stadio Renzo Barbera; Attendance: 8,689; Referee: Marco Guida

4 December 2016 15	Fiorentina	2–1	Palermo	Florence
20:45 CET (UTC+01:00)	Bernardeschi 33' (pen.); Tomović (yellow card) 51'; Badelj (yellow card) 82'; Babacar 90+3'	Report	Morganella (yellow card) 30'; Aleesami (yellow card) 33'; Jajalo 49'	Stadium: Stadio Artemio Franchi; Attendance: 22,533; Referee: Piero Giacomelli

11 December 2016 16	Palermo	0–2	Chievo	Palermo
15:00 CET (UTC+01:00)	Chochev (yellow card) 63'	Report	Birsa 14'; Pellissier 49'; De Guzmán (yellow card) 73'	Stadium: Stadio Renzo Barbera; Attendance: 21,232; Referee: Paolo Tagliavento

18 December 2016 17	Genoa	3–4	Palermo	Genoa
15:00 CET (UTC+01:00)	Simeone 4', 57'; Ntcham (yellow card) 48'; Rigoni (yellow card) 58'; Ninković 65'; Edenílson (yellow card) 68'; Perin (red card) 90+3'	Report	Anđelković (yellow card) 26'; Quaison 42'; Cionek (yellow card) 45+1'; Goldaniga (yellow card) 52', (goal) 69'; Jajalo (yellow card) 61'; Rispoli 88'; Trajkovski 90'; Nestorovski (yellow card) 90+5'	Stadium: Stadio Luigi Ferraris; Attendance: 19,003; Referee: Luca Pairetto

22 December 2016 18	Palermo	1–1	Pescara	Palermo
20:45 CET (UTC+01:00)	Quaison 33'; Jajalo (yellow card) 39'; Nestorovski (yellow card) 42'; Henrique (yellow card) 76'; González (yellow card) 88'	Report	Pettinari (yellow card) 12'; Campagnaro (yellow card) 35'; Biraghi (yellow card) 70', (goal) 90+3' (pen.); Caprari (yellow card) 84'; Benali (yellow card) 87'	Stadium: Stadio Renzo Barbera; Attendance: 20,238; Referee: Davide Massa

7 January 2017 19	Empoli	1–0	Palermo	Empoli
18:00 CET (UTC+01:00)	Laurini (yellow card) 57'; Maccarone 78' (pen.)	Report	Morganella (yellow card) 74'; Cionek (yellow card) 77'; Bruno Henrique (yellow card) 90+3'	Stadium: Stadio Carlo Castellani; Attendance: 7,268; Referee: Paolo Valeri

15 January 2017 20	Sassuolo	4–1	Palermo	Reggio Emilia
15:00 CET (UTC+01:00)	Matri 15', 66'; Ragusa 24'; Mazzitelli (yellow card) 47'; Lirola (yellow card) 71'; Politano 83'	Report	Quaison 8', (yellow card) 33'; Goldaniga (yellow card) 74'	Stadium: Mapei Stadium – Città del Tricolore; Attendance: 9,074; Referee: Paolo Mazzoleni

22 January 2017 21	Palermo	0–1	Internazionale	Palermo
15:00 CET (UTC+01:00)	Nestorovski (yellow card) 19'; Goldaniga (yellow card) 43'; Gazzi (yellow card) 63' (yellow-red card) 90+5'; Balogh (yellow card) 78'; Diamanti (yellow card) 83'; Quaison (yellow card) 90+1'	Report	Ansaldi (yellow card) 22' (yellow-red card) 79'; D'Ambrosio (yellow card) 36'; João Mário 65'	Stadium: Stadio Renzo Barbera; Attendance: 16,436; Referee: Massimiliano Irrati

29 January 2017 22	Napoli	1–1	Palermo	Naples
20:45 CET (UTC+01:00)	Mertens 66'	Report	Nestorovski 6'; Quaison (yellow card) 23'; Bruno Henrique (yellow card) 32'; Jajalo (yellow card) 65'; Goldaniga (red card) 90'; González (yellow card) 90+2'	Stadium: Stadio San Paolo; Attendance: 41,166; Referee: Domenico Celi

5 February 2017 23	Palermo	1–0	Crotone	Palermo
18:00 CET (UTC+01:00)	Cionek (yellow card) 9'; Nestorovski 27'; Rispoli (yellow card) 57'	Report	Crisetig (yellow card) 62' (yellow-red card) 69'; Barberis (yellow card) 71'; Stoian (yellow card) 76'	Stadium: Stadio Renzo Barbera; Attendance: 8,934; Referee: Gianluca Rocchi

12 February 2017 24	Palermo	1–3	Atalanta	Palermo
15:00 CET (UTC+01:00)	Rispoli (yellow card) 11'; González (yellow card) 23'; Chochev 41'; Goldaniga (yellow card) 73'	Report	Conti 19'; Gómez 26'; Freuler (yellow card) 72'; Cristante 78'	Stadium: Stadio Renzo Barbera; Attendance: 12,844; Referee: Daniele Orsato

17 February 2017 25	Juventus	4–1	Palermo	Turin
20:45 CET (UTC+01:00)	Marchisio 13', (yellow card) 36'; Dybala 40', 89'; Higuaín 63'	Report	Goldaniga (yellow card) 4'; Chochev 90+3'	Stadium: Juventus Stadium; Attendance: 39,247; Referee: Marco Di Bello

26 February 2017 26	Palermo	1–1	Sampdoria	Palermo
12:30 CET (UTC+01:00)	Gazzi (yellow card) 19'; Nestorovski 31' (pen.); Bruno Henrique (yellow card) 53'	Report	Cigarini (yellow card) 18'; Đuričić (yellow card) 46'; Quagliarella 90'	Stadium: Stadio Renzo Barbera; Attendance: 10,139; Referee: Daniele Doveri

5 March 2017 27	Torino	3–1	Palermo	Turin
15:00 CET (UTC+01:00)	Belotti 73', 76', 81'	Report	Balogh (yellow card) 27' (yellow-red card) 78'; Rispoli 30', (yellow card) 33'; Sallai (yellow card) 56'	Stadium: Stadio Olimpico Grande Torino; Attendance: 16,098; Referee: Nicola Rizzoli

12 March 2017 28	Palermo	0–3	Roma	Palermo
20:45 CET (UTC+01:00)	Bruno Henrique (yellow card) 18'; Gazzi (yellow card) 67'	Report	Peres (yellow card) 15', (goal) 90+1'; El Shaarawy 22'; Paredes (yellow card) 54'; Grenier (yellow card) 61'; Džeko 76'	Stadium: Stadio Renzo Barbera; Attendance: 12,961; Referee: Gianluca Rocchi

19 March 2017 29	Udinese	4–1	Palermo	Udine
18:00 CET (UTC+01:00)	Théréau 42', (yellow card) 45'; Zapata 60'; De Paul 68'; Hallfreðsson (yellow card) 71'; Danilo (yellow card) 71'; Jankto 80'	Report	Sallai 12'; Gazzi (yellow card) 53'; Diamanti (red card) 74'; Morganella (yellow card) 84'	Stadium: Stadio Friuli; Attendance: 15,469; Referee: Fabio Maresca

2 April 2017 30	Palermo	1–3	Cagliari	Palermo
15:00 CEST (UTC+02:00)	Gazzi (yellow card) 5'; González 26'; Bruno Henrique (yellow card) 75'; Trajkovski (yellow card) 90'	Report	Isla (yellow card) 16'; Ioniță 48', 88'; Borriello 58'	Stadium: Stadio Renzo Barbera; Attendance: 11,938; Referee: Paolo Valeri

9 April 2017 31	Milan	4–0	Palermo	Milan
15:00 CEST (UTC+02:00)	Suso 6'; Pašalić 19', (yellow card) 20'; Bacca 37'; Deulofeu 70'	Report	Goldaniga (yellow card) 5'; González (yellow card) 22' (yellow-red card) 83'; Cionek (yellow card) 75'	Stadium: San Siro; Attendance: 36,808; Referee: Marco Di Bello

15 April 2017 32	Palermo	0–0	Bologna	Palermo
15:00 CEST (UTC+02:00)	Jajalo (yellow card) 27'; Cionek (yellow card) 37'; Aleesami (yellow card) 53'; Šunjić (yellow card) 75'	Report	Pulgar (red card) 25'; Verdi (yellow card) 38'; Masina (yellow card) 79'	Stadium: Stadio Renzo Barbera; Attendance: 9,915; Referee: Luca Banti

23 April 2017 33	Lazio	6–2	Palermo	Rome
15:00 CEST (UTC+02:00)	Immobile 8', 9'; Keita 21', 24' (pen.), 26'; Milinković-Savić (yellow card) 59'; Crecco 90'	Report	Rispoli 46', 52'; Gazzi (yellow card) 63'	Stadium: Stadio Olimpico; Attendance: 25,000; Referee: Michael Fabbri

30 April 2017 34	Palermo	2–0	Fiorentina	Palermo
15:00 CEST (UTC+02:00)	Nestorovski (yellow card) 20'; Diamanti 32', (yellow card) 55'; Aleesami 90'	Report	Salcedo (yellow card) 31'; Astori (yellow card) 63' (yellow-red card) 87'; Badelj (yellow card) 87'	Stadium: Stadio Renzo Barbera; Attendance: 10,327; Referee: Paolo Tagliavento

7 May 2017 35	Chievo	1–1	Palermo	Verona
15:00 CEST (UTC+02:00)	Cesar (yellow card) 46'; Pellissier 67' (pen.); Gamberini (yellow card) 82'; Birsa (yellow card) 87'	Report	Jajalo (yellow card) 21'; González (yellow card) 41'; Sallai (yellow card) 77'; Goldaniga 88'	Stadium: Stadio Marc'Antonio Bentegodi; Attendance: 10,000; Referee: Marco Serra

14 May 2017 36	Palermo	1–0	Genoa	Palermo
15:00 CEST (UTC+02:00)	Rispoli 13'; Bruno Henrique (yellow card) 25'	Report	Rigoni (yellow card) 5'	Stadium: Stadio Renzo Barbera; Attendance: 8,863; Referee: Daniele Doveri

22 May 2017 37	Pescara	2–0	Palermo	Pescara
20:45 CEST (UTC+02:00)	Murić 15'; Biraghi (yellow card) 43'; Brugman (yellow card) 60'; Mitriță 87'	Report		Stadium: Stadio Adriatico – Giovanni Cornacchia; Attendance: 10,062; Referee: Luca Pairetto

28 May 2017 38	Palermo	2–1	Empoli	Palermo
20:45 CEST (UTC+02:00)	Aleesami (yellow card) 11'; Diamanti (yellow card) 69'; Nestorovski 76'; Bruno Henrique 84'; Chochev (yellow card) 90+2'	Report	Bellusci (yellow card) 39'; Dioussé (yellow card) 49'; Laurini (yellow card) 66'; Costa (yellow card) 67'; Krunić 87'	Stadium: Stadio Renzo Barbera; Attendance: 8,559; Referee: Nicola Rizzoli

=== Coppa Italia ===
12 August 2016 Third round	Palermo	1–0 (a.e.t.)	Bari	Palermo
21:00 CEST (UTC+02:00)	Morganella (yellow card) 40'; Gazzi (yellow card) 51'; Aleesami (yellow card) 66'; Lo Faso (yellow card) 105'; Chochev 120+1'	Report	Cassani (yellow card) 2' (yellow-red card) 90+3'; Fedato (yellow card) 109'	Stadium: Stadio Renzo Barbera; Attendance: 7,483; Referee: Daniele Doveri

30 November 2016 Fourth round	Palermo	0–0 (a.e.t.) (4–5 p)	Spezia	Palermo
15:00 CET (UTC+01:00)	Lo Faso (yellow card) 57'; Vitiello (yellow card) 108' (yellow-red card) 113'; Quaison (yellow card) 118'	Report	Valentini (yellow card) 82'	Stadium: Stadio Renzo Barbera; Attendance: 4,629; Referee: Gianluca Aureliano
	Penalties
	Diamanti (penalty scored); Hiljemark (penalty scored); Aleesami (penalty scored); Quaison (penalty scored); Balogh (penalty missed); Goldaniga (penalty missed)		(penalty scored) Sciaudone; (penalty scored) Okereke; (penalty scored) Piu; (penalty missed) Galli; (penalty scored) Chichizola; (penalty scored) Migliore

== Statistics ==
=== Appearances and goals ===
No.	Pos	Nat	Player	Total		Serie A		Coppa Italia	
No.	Pos	Nat	Player	Apps	Goals	Apps	Goals	Apps	Goals
Goalkeepers
1	GK	(Croatia) CRO	Josip Posavec	30	0	29	0	1	0
55	GK	(Italy) ITA	Leonardo Marson	0	0	0	0	0	0
68	GK	(Italy) ITA	Andrea Fulignati	10	0	9	0	1	0
Defenders
2	DF	(Italy) ITA	Roberto Vitiello	7	0	5	0	2	0
3	DF	(Italy) ITA	Andrea Rispoli	33	6	30+2	6	1	0
4	DF	(Slovenia) SLO	Siniša Anđelković	21	0	20+1	0	0	0
5	DF	(Serbia) SRB	Slobodan Rajković	5	0	4	0	1	0
6	DF	(Italy) ITA	Edoardo Goldaniga	30	2	26+2	2	2	0
12	DF	(Costa Rica) CRC	Giancarlo González	21	1	18+3	1	0	0
15	DF	(Poland) POL	Thiago Cionek	30	0	26+3	0	0+1	0
19	DF	(Norway) NOR	Haitam Aleesami	33	1	29+2	1	1+1	0
44	DF	(Bosnia and Herzegovina) BIH	Toni Šunjić	7	0	2+5	0	0	0
89	DF	(Switzerland) SUI	Michel Morganella	12	0	7+4	0	1	0
97	DF	(Italy) ITA	Giuseppe Pezzella	11	0	9+1	0	1	0
Midfielders
14	MF	(Italy) ITA	Alessandro Gazzi	27	0	22+3	0	2	0
18	MF	(Bulgaria) BUL	Ivaylo Chochev	31	4	25+5	3	1	1
20	MF	(Hungary) HUN	Roland Sallai	22	1	11+10	1	1	0
23	MF	(Italy) ITA	Alessandro Diamanti	32	1	18+13	1	0+1	0
25	MF	(Brazil) BRA	Bruno Henrique	33	0	24+9	0	0	0
61	MF	(Italy) ITA	Gennaro Ruggiero	2	0	2+0	0	0	0
28	MF	(Bosnia and Herzegovina) BIH	Mato Jajalo	26	1	22+4	1	0	0
Forwards
8	FW	(North Macedonia) MKD	Aleksandar Trajkovski	11	1	5+6	1	0	0
9	FW	(Sweden) SWE	Stefan Silva	1	0	0+1	0	0	0
11	FW	(Guinea-Bissau) GBS	Carlos Embaló	12	0	8+4	0	0	0
22	FW	(Hungary) HUN	Norbert Balogh	18	0	6+10	0	1+1	0
30	FW	(North Macedonia) MKD	Ilija Nestorovski	38	11	34+3	11	1	0
98	FW	(Italy) ITA	Simone Lo Faso	12	0	1+9	0	1+1	0
Players transferred out during the season
7	DF	(Morocco) MAR	Achraf Lazaar	1	0	0	0	0+1	0
10	MF	(Sweden) SWE	Oscar Hiljemark	16	0	12+3	0	1	0
21	MF	(Sweden) SWE	Robin Quaison	18	4	11+6	4	1	0
24	MF	(Netherlands) NED	Ouasim Bouy	3	0	0+2	0	1	0
27	FW	(Italy) ITA	Accursio Bentivegna	4	0	2+1	0	1	0

Last updated: 28 May 2017
Source: Competitions

=== Goalscorers ===
Rank	No.	Pos	Nat	Name	Serie A	Coppa Italia	Total
1	30	FW	(North Macedonia)	Ilija Nestorovski	11	0	11
2	3	DF	(Italy)	Andrea Rispoli	6	0	6
3	18	MF	(Bulgaria)	Ivaylo Chochev	3	1	4
3	21	MF	(Sweden)	Robin Quaison	4	0	4
5	6	DF	(Italy)	Edoardo Goldaniga	2	0	2
6	8	FW	(North Macedonia)	Aleksandar Trajkovski	1	0	1
6	12	DF	(Costa Rica)	Giancarlo González	1	0	1
6	19	DF	(Norway)	Haitam Aleesami	1	0	1
6	20	MF	(Hungary)	Roland Sallai	1	0	1
6	23	MF	(Italy)	Alessandro Diamanti	1	0	1
6	25	MF	(Brazil)	Bruno Henrique	1	0	1
6	28	MF	(Bosnia and Herzegovina)	Mato Jajalo	1	0	1
Own goal					0	0	0
Totals					33	1	34

Last updated: 28 May 2017

=== Clean sheets ===
Rank	No.	Pos	Nat	Name	Serie A	Coppa Italia	Total
1	68	GK	(Italy)	Andrea Fulignati	3	1	4
2	1	GK	(Croatia)	Josip Posavec	2	1	3
Totals					5	2	7

Last updated: 28 May 2017

=== Disciplinary record ===
No.	Pos	Nat	Player	Serie A			Coppa Italia			Total		
No.	Pos	Nat	Player	Booked	(yellow card) (yellow-red card)	Sent off (straight red)	Booked	(yellow card) (yellow-red card)	Sent off (straight red)	Booked	(yellow card) (yellow-red card)	Sent off (straight red)
1	GK	(Croatia)	Josip Posavec	1	0	0	0	0	0	1	0	0
2	DF	(Italy)	Roberto Vitiello	1	0	0	0	1	0	1	1	0
3	DF	(Italy)	Andrea Rispoli	5	0	0	0	0	0	5	0	0
4	DF	(Slovenia)	Siniša Anđelković	3	0	0	0	0	0	3	0	0
5	DF	(Serbia)	Slobodan Rajković	0	1	0	0	0	0	0	1	0
6	DF	(Italy)	Edoardo Goldaniga	11	0	1	0	0	0	11	0	1
12	DF	(Costa Rica)	Giancarlo González	7	1	1	0	0	0	7	1	1
15	DF	(Poland)	Thiago Cionek	8	0	0	0	0	0	8	0	0
19	DF	(Norway)	Haitam Aleesami	6	0	0	1	0	0	7	0	0
44	DF	(Bosnia and Herzegovina)	Toni Šunjić	1	0	0	0	0	0	1	0	0
89	DF	(Switzerland)	Michel Morganella	3	0	0	1	0	0	4	0	0
97	DF	(Italy)	Giuseppe Pezzella	1	0	0	0	0	0	1	0	0
10	MF	(Sweden)	Oscar Hiljemark	1	0	0	0	0	0	1	0	0
14	MF	(Italy)	Alessandro Gazzi	6	2	0	1	0	0	7	2	0
18	MF	(Bulgaria)	Ivaylo Chochev	4	0	0	0	0	0	4	0	0
20	MF	(Hungary)	Roland Sallai	3	1	0	0	0	0	3	1	0
21	MF	(Sweden)	Robin Quaison	5	0	0	1	0	0	6	0	0
23	MF	(Italy)	Alessandro Diamanti	8	0	1	0	0	0	8	0	1
24	MF	(Netherlands)	Ouasim Bouy	1	0	0	0	0	0	1	0	0
25	MF	(Brazil)	Bruno Henrique	7	0	0	0	0	0	7	0	0
28	MF	(Bosnia and Herzegovina)	Mato Jajalo	5	0	0	0	0	0	5	0	0
8	FW	(North Macedonia)	Aleksandar Trajkovski	1	0	0	0	0	0	1	0	0
22	FW	(Hungary)	Norbert Balogh	1	1	0	0	0	0	1	1	0
30	FW	(North Macedonia)	Ilija Nestorovski	5	0	0	0	0	0	5	0	0
98	FW	(Italy)	Simone Lo Faso	0	0	0	2	0	0	2	0	0
Totals				94	6	3	6	1	0	100	7	3

Last updated: 28 May 2017
