= Mato Jajalo =

Bosnian footballer (born 1988)

Personal information
- Date of birth: 25 May 1988 (age 38)
- Place of birth: Jajce, SR Bosnia and Herzegovina, SFR Yugoslavia
- Height: 1.82 m (6 ft 0 in)
- Position: Defensive midfielder

Youth career
- 1993–1999: DJK Eiche Offenbach
- 1999–2007: Slaven Belupo

Senior career*
Years	Team	Apps	(Gls)
2007–2009	Slaven Belupo	63	(8)
2009–2011	Siena	25	(0)
2010–2011	→ 1. FC Köln (loan)	30	(2)
2011–2014	1. FC Köln	60	(3)
2014	→ Sarajevo (loan)	9	(0)
2014–2015	Rijeka	18	(1)
2015–2019	Palermo	138	(6)
2019–2023	Udinese	52	(0)
2023–2024	Venezia	21	(0)
Total		416	(20)

International career
2008–2009	Croatia U20	7	(1)
2007–2010	Croatia U21	21	(4)
2014–2015	Croatia	2	(0)
2016–2019	Bosnia and Herzegovina	11	(0)
- * Club domestic league appearances and goals as of 5 May 2024

Mato Jajalo (pronounced [mâːto jǎjalo]; born 25 May 1988) is a Bosnian former professional footballer who played as a defensive midfielder.

Jajalo started his professional career at Slaven Belupo, before joining Siena in 2009. The following year, he was loaned to 1. FC Köln, with whom he signed permanently a year later. In 2014, he was sent on loan to Sarajevo. Later that year, he moved to Rijeka. Jajalo joined Palermo in 2015. Four years later, he switched to Udinese. In 2023, he was transferred to Venezia.

A former Croatian youth international, Jajalo also made his senior international debut for Croatia, before switching his allegiance to Bosnia and Herzegovina in 2016, earning 11 caps until 2019.

== Club career ==
=== Early career ===
Because of the outbreak of the Bosnian War, Jajalo's family fled from his native Bosnia and Herzegovina and moved to Germany, where he started playing football at a local club, before joining the youth setup of Croatian team Slaven Belupo in 1999. He made his professional debut against Osijek on 22 July 2007 at the age of 19. On 5 August, he scored his first professional goal in a triumph over Zagreb.

In June 2009, Jajalo was transferred to Italian side Siena.

In July 2010, he was sent on a season-long loan to German outfit 1. FC Köln, with an option to make the transfer permanent, which was activated the following year. In February 2014, he was loaned to Sarajevo until the end of the season.

In June, he joined Rijeka.

=== Palermo ===
In January 2015, Jajalo moved to Palermo on a contract until June 2019. He made his official debut for the team on 1 February against Hellas Verona. On 24 May, he scored his first goal for the squad against Fiorentina.

Despite Palermo's relegation to the Serie B in April 2017, Jajalo decided to stay at the club.

He played his 100th game for the side against Parma on 2 April 2018.

=== Udinese ===
In June 2019, Jajalo signed a three-year deal with Udinese. He made his competitive debut for the squad in a Coppa Italia match against Südtirol on 18 August. A week later, he made his league debut against Milan.

In December 2020, he suffered a severe knee injury, which was diagnosed as an anterior cruciate ligament tear and was ruled out for at least six months. Over eight months after the injury, on 22 August 2021, he returned to the pitch.

In March 2022, he extended his contract with Udinese until June 2023.

=== Later stage of career ===
In January 2023, Jajalo switched to Venezia. In March, he suffered a ruptured anterior cruciate ligament again and was expected to be sidelined for at least half a year.

He announced his retirement from football on 1 July 2024.

== International career ==
After representing Croatia at various youth levels and captaining them at the under-21 level under coach Dražen Ladić, Jajalo made his senior international debut in a friendly game against Argentina on 12 November 2014. However, in March 2016, he decided that he would play for Bosnia and Herzegovina in the future.

In July, his request to change sports citizenship from Croatian to Bosnian was approved by FIFA. Subsequently, in September, he received his first senior call up, for 2018 FIFA World Cup qualifiers against Belgium and Cyprus. He debuted against the former on 7 October.

== Personal life ==
Jajalo's younger brother Ivan is also a professional footballer.

He married his long-time girlfriend Ivana in May 2012. Together they have four children, three sons named Emanuel, Gabriel and Mateo and a daughter named Elena.

== Career statistics ==
=== Club ===
Appearances and goals by club, season and competition
Club	Season	League			National cup (Note: Includes Croatian Cup, Coppa Italia, DFB-Pokal, Bosnian Cup)		Continental		Other		Total	
Club	Season	Division	Apps	Goals	Apps	Goals	Apps	Goals	Apps	Goals	Apps	Goals
Slaven Belupo	2007–08	Croatian Football League	31	4	3	0	3 (Note: Appearances in UEFA Cup)	0	–		37	4
Slaven Belupo	2008–09	Croatian Football League	32	4	2	0	4	0	–		38	4
Slaven Belupo	Total		63	8	5	0	7	0	–		75	8
Siena	2009–10	Serie A	25	0	1	0	–		–		26	0
1. FC Köln (loan)	2010–11	Bundesliga	30	2	3	0	–		–		33	2
1. FC Köln	2011–12	Bundesliga	31	3	2	2	–		–		33	5
1. FC Köln	2012–13	Bundesliga	24	0	2	0	–		–		26	0
1. FC Köln	2013–14	2. Bundesliga	5	0	1	0	–		–		6	0
1. FC Köln	Total		90	5	8	2	–		–		98	7
Sarajevo (loan)	2013–14	Bosnian Premier League	9	0	6	1	–		–		15	1
Rijeka	2014–15	Croatian Football League	18	1	2	1	12 (Note: Appearances in UEFA Europa League)	0	1 (Note: Appearance in Croatian Super Cup)	0	33	2
Palermo	2014–15	Serie A	16	1	–		–		–		16	1
Palermo	2015–16	Serie A	28	0	1	0	–		–		29	0
Palermo	2016–17	Serie A	26	1	0	0	–		–		26	1
Palermo	2017–18	Serie B	35	1	2	0	–		4 (Note: Appearance(s) in Serie B promotion play-offs)	0	41	1
Palermo	2018–19	Serie B	33	3	2	0	–		–		35	3
Palermo	Total		138	6	5	0	–		4	0	147	6
Udinese	2019–20	Serie A	26	0	2	0	–		–		28	0
Udinese	2020–21	Serie A	1	0	1	0	–		–		2	0
Udinese	2021–22	Serie A	22	0	2	0	–		–		24	0
Udinese	2022–23	Serie A	3	0	1	0	–		–		4	0
Udinese	Total		52	0	6	0	–		–		58	0
Venezia	2022–23	Serie B	7	0	–		–		–		7	0
Venezia	2023–24	Serie B	14	0	0	0	–		1	0	15	0
Venezia	Total		21	0	0	0	–		1	0	22	0
Career total			416	20	33	4	19	0	6	0	474	24

=== International ===
Appearances and goals by national team and year
National team	Year	Apps	Goals
Croatia
Croatia	2014	1	0
Croatia	2015	1	0
Croatia	Total	2	0
Bosnia and Herzegovina
Bosnia and Herzegovina	2016	2	0
Bosnia and Herzegovina	2017	5	0
Bosnia and Herzegovina	2018	0	0
Bosnia and Herzegovina	2019	4	0
Bosnia and Herzegovina	Total	11	0
Career total		13	0

== Honours ==
Sarajevo

- Bosnian Cup: 2013–14

Rijeka

- Croatian Super Cup: 2014
