= Haitam Aleesami =

Norwegian footballer (born 1991)

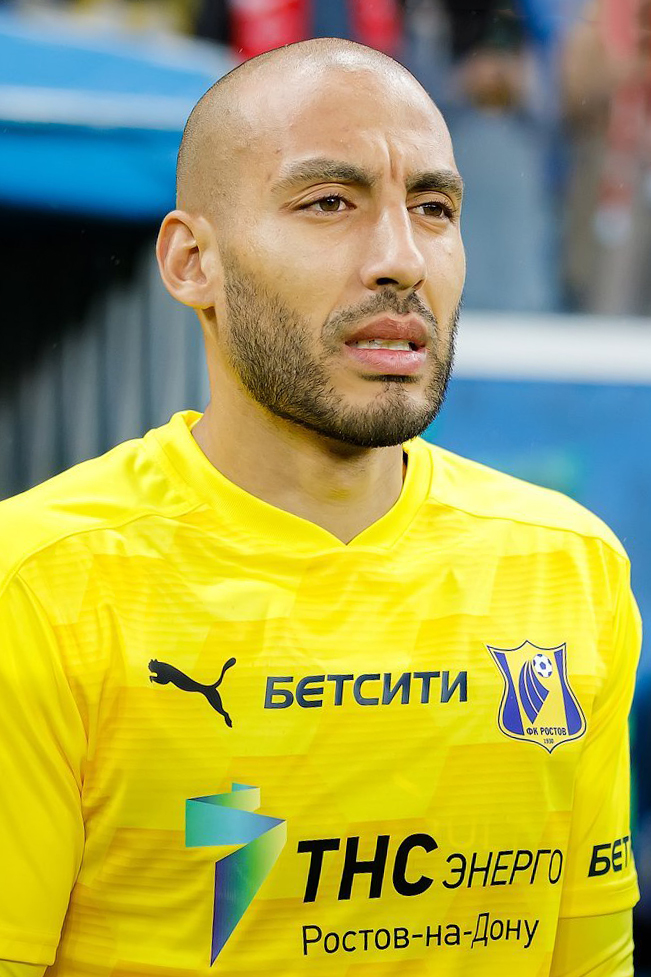
- Aleesami with FC Rostov in 2021

Personal information
- Full name: Haitam Aleesami
- Date of birth: 31 July 1991 (age 35)
- Place of birth: Oslo, Norway
- Height: 1.83 m (6 ft 0 in)
- Positions: Left-back; centre-back

Team information
- Current team: Bodø/Glimt
- Number: 5

Youth career
- –2007: Nordstrand
- 2008: Holmlia
- 2009–2010: Skeid

Senior career*
Years	Team	Apps	(Gls)
2010–2012	Skeid		
2012–2014	Fredrikstad	68	(5)
2015–2016	IFK Göteborg	45	(2)
2016–2019	Palermo	90	(1)
2019–2020	Amiens	22	(1)
2020–2021	Rostov	13	(0)
2021–2023	Apollon Limassol	36	(0)
2024	KFUM Oslo	25	(1)
2025–	Bodø/Glimt	44	(3)

International career^{‡}
2015–2020	Norway	31	(0)
- * Club domestic league appearances and goals as of 31 October 2026 ‡ National team caps and goals as of 11 October 2020

Haitam Aleesami (Arabic: هيثم العصامي; born 31 July 1991) is a Norwegian professional footballer who plays as a left-back for Eliteserien club Bodø/Glimt.

== Club career ==
Born in Oslo and of Moroccan descent, Haitam Aleesami started playing football for Nordstrand, Holmlia and later Skeid. He joined Skeid's first-team squad in 2010, playing in the Second Division, and was named "Skeid's best young player of the year" in 2011.

In August 2012, he joined Fredrikstad FK to replace Benjamin Dahl Hagen, who had returned to Vålerenga after a loan spell. Aleesami made his debut in Tippeligaen and assisted Tarik Elyounoussi's goal when Fredrikstad won 2–0 in the match against Tromsø on 5 August 2012.

On 18 August 2014, he signed a four-year contract with Swedish club IFK Göteborg. He joined the club in the pre-season before the 2015 season.

On 8 August 2016, he signed with Palermo.

On 17 October 2020, he joined Russian Premier League club FC Rostov. He left Rostov on 19 May 2021.

On 16 August 2021, he signed a two-year contract with Apollon Limassol in Cyprus.

After half a season without a club, Aleesami signed with newly promoted Eliteserien side KFUM Oslo in December 2023.

On 15 March 2025, Aleesami signed a two-year contract with Bodø/Glimt.

== Personal life ==
Haitam's younger brother Ayoub Aleesami is also a professional footballer. Like his older brother, Ayoub is a defender in the Eliteserien and currently plays for Haitam's former club KFUM. While Ayoub and Haitam have similar appearances, the latter is vastly more known due to playing internationally; thus, Ayoub is often confused for Haitam.

== Career statistics ==
=== Club ===
As of match played 4 November 2026

Appearances and goals by club, season and competition
Club	Season	League			National cup (Note: Includes Norwegian Cup, Svenska Cupen, Coppa Italia, Coupe de France, Russian Cup, Cypriot Cup)		League cup (Note: Includes Coupe de la Ligue)		Europe		Other		Total	
Club	Season	Division	Apps	Goals	Apps	Goals	Apps	Goals	Apps	Goals	Apps	Goals	Apps	Goals
Skeid	2012	Norwegian Second Division	13	2	2	0	—		—		—		15	2
Fredrikstad	2012	Tippeligaen	13	0	—		—		—		—		13	0
Fredrikstad	2013	Norwegian First Division	30	4	1	0	—		—		—		31	4
Fredrikstad	2014	Norwegian First Division	25	1	2	0	—		—		1 (Note: Appearance in Norwegian First Division promotional play-offs)	0	28	1
Fredrikstad	Total		68	5	3	0	—		—		1	0	72	5
IFK Göteborg	2015	Allsvenskan	30	2	5	0	—		4 (Note: Appearances in UEFA Europa League)	1	1 (Note: Appearance in Svenska Supercupen)	0	40	3
IFK Göteborg	2016	Allsvenskan	15	0	3	0	—		5	0	—		23	0
IFK Göteborg	Total		45	2	8	0	—		9	1	1	0	63	3
Palermo	2016–17	Serie A	31	1	2	0	—		—		—		33	1
Palermo	2017–18	Serie B	30	0	2	1	—		—		—		32	1
Palermo	2018–19	Serie B	29	0	0	0	—		—		—		29	0
Palermo	Total		90	1	4	1	—		—		—		94	2
Amiens	2019–20	Ligue 1	22	1	1	0	2	0	—		—		25	1
Rostov	2020–21	Russian Premier League	13	0	1	0	—		0	0	—		14	0
Apollon Limassol	2021–22	Cypriot First Division	20	0	1	1	—		—		—		21	1
Apollon Limassol	2022–23	Cypriot First Division	16	0	1	0	—		4 (Note: Appearances in UEFA Conference League)	0	0	0	21	0
Apollon Limassol	Total		36	0	2	1	—		4	0	0	0	38	1
KFUM Oslo	2024	Eliteserien	25	1	3	1	—		—		—		28	2
Bodø/Glimt	2025	Eliteserien	25	2	3	0	—		6 (Note: Appearances in UEFA Champions League)	1	—		34	3
Bodø/Glimt	2026	Eliteserien	19	1	5	0	—		10 (Note: Appearances in UEFA Champions League)	1	—		34	2
Bodø/Glimt	Total		44	3	8	0	—		16	2	—		68	5
Career total			357	15	31	3	2	0	29	3	2	0	421	21

=== International ===
As of 11 October 2020

Appearances and goals by national team and year
National team	Year	Apps	Goals
Norway	2015	3	0
Norway	2016	9	0
Norway	2017	4	0
Norway	2018	3	0
Norway	2019	9	0
Norway	2020	3	0
Total		31	0

== Honours ==
IFK Göteborg

- Svenska Cupen: 2014–15

FK Bodø/Glimt

- Norwegian Football Cup: 2025–26
