= Ouasim Bouy =

Dutch professional footballer

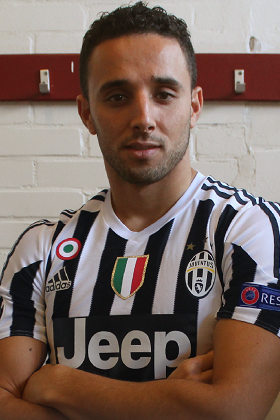
- Bouy with Juventus in 2016

Personal information
- Full name: Ouasim Bouy
- Date of birth: 11 June 1993 (age 33)
- Place of birth: Amsterdam, Netherlands
- Height: 1.80 m (5 ft 11 in)
- Positions: Centre back; defensive midfielder

Youth career
- 1999–2008: Zeeburgia
- 2008–2012: Ajax

Senior career*
Years	Team	Apps	(Gls)
2012–2017	Juventus	0	(0)
2012–2013	→ Brescia (loan)	17	(1)
2014	→ Hamburger SV (loan)	3	(0)
2014–2015	→ Panathinaikos (loan)	13	(1)
2015–2016	→ PEC Zwolle (loan)	28	(4)
2016	→ Palermo (loan)	2	(0)
2017	→ PEC Zwolle (loan)	13	(0)
2017–2021	Leeds United	0	(0)
2017–2018	→ Cultural Leonesa (loan)	2	(0)
2018–2019	→ PEC Zwolle (loan)	18	(0)
2021–2022	Al Kharaitiyat		

International career
2007–2008	Netherlands U15	2	(0)
2009–2010	Netherlands U17	10	(1)
2011–2013	Netherlands U19	18	(3)
- * Club domestic league appearances and goals as of 13:21, 30 May 2021 (UTC)

Ouasim Bouy (born 11 June 1993) is a Dutch retired footballer who played as a defensive midfielder or centre back.

Bouy is a former Netherlands U19 international, and is able to represent either the Netherlands or Morocco at senior level.

== Club career ==
=== Early career ===
Born in Amsterdam, Bouy grew up in the youth academy of A.V.V. Zeeburgia, where he remained from 1999 until 2008. The young player was scouted by local giants AFC Ajax, where he eventually transferred in July 2008.

After officially joining the neighboring giants, Bouy was registered into the club's youth academy. Bouy would ultimately remain within the club's youth setup for three years before transferring to Italian giants, Juventus on a free transfer.

=== Juventus ===
On 30 January 2012, Bouy traveled to Turin to have a medical in the Clinica Fornaca di Sessant and at the Istituto di Medicina dello Sport in order to formalize the potential transfer to Juventus, that was sealed just an hour later. Involved with the Primavera for the remainder of the season, he scored several goals and impressed with his creativity and maturity. On 31 August 2012, Bouy signed for Serie B side, Brescia Calcio on a season-long loan deal. One day later, Bouy made his senior debut in the 2012–13 Serie B against Juve Stabia. Following his debut for the club, Bouy's form continued to excel, as he earned a place in the club's starting lineup, scoring a single goal, and assisting 5 others in his first 17 matches. His great form for Brescia was unfortunately brought to an end on 6 February 2013, when he suffered an ACL injury in a friendly, thus ending his season.

On 30 June 2013, Bouy returned to Juventus upon the expiration of his loan deal. He played his first match for Juventus on 12 December 2013, entering as a substitute in the 2013–14 Coppa Italia against Serie B side Avellino. Juventus won the match 3–0 to progress into the quarter-finals. During the 2014 January transfer window, Brescia were rumored to be interested in re-acquiring his services on a six-month loan deal,

==== Hamburger SV loan ====
On 16 January 2014, Bouy was officially loaned out to Hamburger SV of the Bundesliga, where he would be able to play under the guidance of fellow Dutchman, Bert van Marwijk. Commenting on the transfer, according to Sky Sports, the experienced coach was quoted as saying, "Ouasim Bouy was a super talent back at Ajax. I have never seen him play, still I am aware of him. He will strengthen us in midfield. He had a bad injury but now he is back fit and is longing to play." After just 3 appearances for the club during the month of February, Bouy failed to make any additional appearances for the first team during the remainder of the season after van Marwijk was sacked as manager of the German club in favor of Mirko Slomka. The club finished the campaign in 16th place and Bouy returned once again to Juventus on 30 June 2014.

==== Further loan spells ====
On 29 July 2014, Bouy signed a one-year loan deal with Super League Greece outfit Panathinaikos. Playing 13 League games and scoring one goal for the club. On 31 August 2015, Bouy signed a one-year loan deal with Dutch side PEC Zwolle. Where he had a successful spell, playing 28 games in the Eredivisie scoring 4 goals. On 26 August 2016, Bouy signed a one-year loan deal with Serie A club Palermo. Before he returned on loan to PEC Zwolle during the January 2017 transfer window.

=== Leeds United ===
On 2 August 2017, Bouy signed for English club Leeds United on a four-year deal on a free transfer from Juventus. On 27 May 2021, Bouy was released by Leeds United, failing to make a single competitive appearance for the club.

==== Cultural Leonesa (loan) ====
On the same day Bouy signed for Leeds United, he was sent out on loan to Spanish side and "sister" team Aspire Academy owned Cultural Leonesa for the duration of the 2017–18 season. On 3 January 2018, Bouy's loan was cut short after failing to stamp his authority on the team, making just 4 appearances in all competitions for Leonesa, he was recalled by parent club Leeds United.

==== Return to Leeds ====
On 2 February 2018, Leeds Head Coach Thomas Christiansen revealed Bouy had turned down loan offers on transfer deadline day, in order to stay at Leeds and earn an opportunity to play and fight for his place in the team.

With speculation that he was not in new Head Coach Marcelo Bielsa's plans, on 26 July 2018, Bouy was not given a shirt number for Leeds for the upcoming 2018–19 season for Leeds.

==== PEC Zwolle loan ====
On 24 August 2018, Bouy joined Eredivisie side PEC Zwolle on a season long loan for the third time in his career. He made his debut on 2 September 2018 in a 1–0 win against FC Groningen. In total, he made 18 appearances for PEC Zwolle.

== International career ==
Bouy has been capped 10 times by the Netherlands U-17 between 2009 and 2010, scoring 1 goal. Since 2010, he also represented the Netherlands U-19 team, scoring 3 goals in 18 appearances.

== Career statistics ==
As of match played 24 July 2020

Appearances and goals by club, season and competition
Club	Season	League			Domestic Cup		League Cup		Other		Total	
Club	Season	Division	Apps	Goals	Apps	Goals	Apps	Goals	Apps	Goals	Apps	Goals
Juventus	2012–13	Serie A	0	0	0	0	—		0	0	0	0
Juventus	2013–14	Serie A	0	0	1	0	—		0	0	1	0
Juventus	Total		0	0	1	0	—		0	0	1	0
Brescia (loan)	2012–13	Serie B	17	1	0	0	—		0	0	17	1
Hamburger SV (loan)	2013–14	Bundesliga	3	0	1	0	—		0	0	4	0
Panathinaikos (loan)	2014–15	Super League Greece	13	0	3	1	—		5 (Note: Appearances in the Europa League)	0	21	1
PEC Zwolle (loan)	2015–16	Eredivisie	28	4	1	0	—		0	0	29	4
Palermo (loan)	2016–17	Serie A	2	0	1	0	—		—		3	0
PEC Zwolle (loan)	2016–17	Eredivisie	13	0	0	0	—		0	0	13	0
Leeds United	2017–18	Championship	0	0	0	0	0	0	0	0	0	0
Leeds United	2018-19	Championship	0	0	0	0	0	0	0	0	0	0
Leeds United	2019-20	Championship	0	0	0	0	0	0	0	0	0	0
Leeds United	Total		0	0	0	0	0	0	0	0	0	0
Cultural Leonesa (loan)	2017–18	Segunda División	2	0	2	0	—		—		4	0
PEC Zwolle (loan)	2018-19	Eredivisie	18	0	2	0	—		—		20	0
Career total			96	5	11	1	0	0	5	0	112	6
