= Aleksandar Trajkovski =

Macedonian footballer (born 1992)

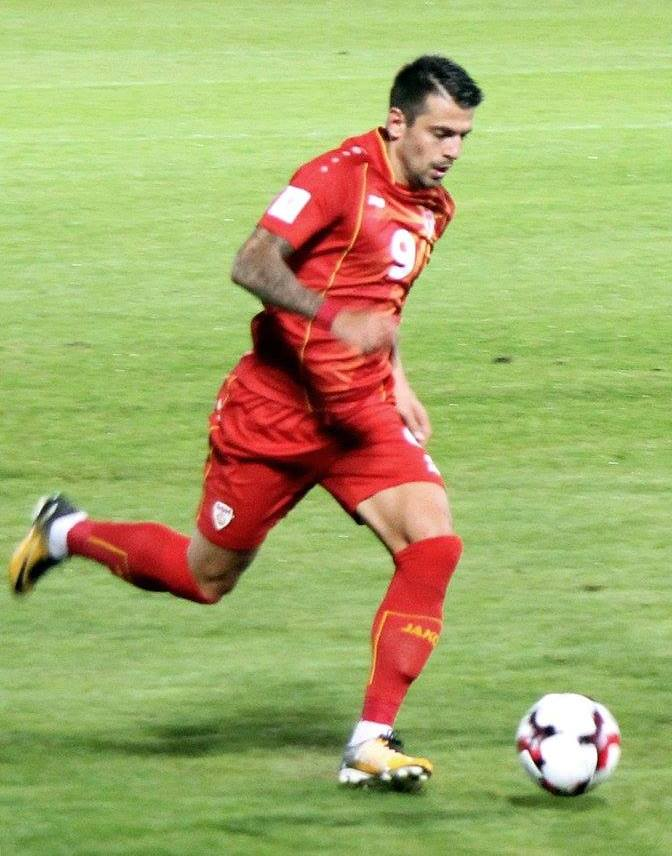
- Trajkovski playing for North Macedonia in 2017

Personal information
- Date of birth: 5 September 1992 (age 34)
- Place of birth: Skopje, Macedonia
- Height: 1.79 m (5 ft 10 in)
- Positions: Forward; winger

Team information
- Current team: Lokomotiva Zagreb
- Number: 7

Youth career
- 2008–2009: Cementarnica 55

Senior career*
Years	Team	Apps	(Gls)
2009–2010	Cementarnica 55	11	(2)
2010–2011	Inter Zaprešić	15	(4)
2011–2015	Zulte Waregem	65	(8)
2013–2014	→ Mechelen (loan)	16	(1)
2015–2019	Palermo	104	(16)
2019–2022	Mallorca	23	(0)
2021–2022	→ AaB (loan)	7	(1)
2022–2023	Al-Fayha	33	(5)
2023–2025	Hajduk Split	33	(10)
2025–	Lokomotiva Zagreb	10	(1)

International career^{‡}
2011–2014	Macedonia U21	15	(3)
2011–2026	North Macedonia	98	(24)
- * Club domestic league appearances and goals as of 17 May 2026 ‡ National team caps and goals as of 23:39, 13 November 2025

Aleksandar Trajkovski (Macedonian: Александар Трајковски; born 5 September 1992) is a Macedonian professional footballer who plays for Lokomotiva Zagreb and the North Macedonia national team. Mainly a forward, he can also play as a winger or an attacking midfielder.

== Club career ==
Trajkovski began his career with FK Cementarnica 55. In May 2010, he joined Chelsea in a trial, scoring the winning goal against Botafogo at the U-19 Copa Amsterdam tournament which guaranteed Chelsea a place in the semi-finals.

After a few years with Cementarnica Skopje, he signed for Inter Zaprešić in the summer of 2010. Good performances in the second half of the season attracted the interest of Dinamo Zagreb, but Trajkovski said that he was not interested in a possible move. At the end of the season, R.S.C. Anderlecht was interested in buying Trajkovski, but their offer of a €500,000 transfer fee was rejected. He joined the Belgian club Zulte Waregem for the new 2011–12 season after their offer of €1.1m was accepted by Inter Zaprešić.

In the summer of 2015, he moved to Italian Serie A club Palermo, signing a five-year contract. In the same year, he was named "Macedonian footballer of the year". Following Palermo's exclusion from the Serie B, he was released together with all other players in July 2019.

On 7 August 2019, Trajkovski agreed to a four-year contract with La Liga newcomers RCD Mallorca. After two seasons at Mallorca, Trajkovski was loaned out to Danish Superliga club AaB on 31 August 2021, for the rest of the season.

On 30 January 2022, Trajkovski joined Saudi club Al-Fayha on an 18-month contract. On 19 May 2022, he won the 2022 King Cup Final with Al-Fayha against Al Hilal.

== International career ==
On 22 May 2012, the Macedonia U21 national team defeated the Netherlands 1–0 in a friendly match, with the sole goal scored by Trajkovski.

Trajkovski debuted for the Macedonian senior squad on 10 August 2011 in a 1–0 away friendly victory against Azerbaijan. He scored his first goal on 14 August 2013 in a 2–0 home friendly victory against Bulgaria. Trajkovski scored a hat-trick on 12 November 2015 in a 4–1 victory over Montenegro at the Philip II Stadium in Skopje.

Trajkovski was selected for the UEFA Euro 2020 as North Macedonia gained its first major tournament. On 24 March 2022, two minutes into injury time he scored a long-range goal in the 2022 FIFA World Cup qualifying playoff semi-finals to beat Italy 1–0 at his former club ground in Palermo, eliminating Italy from the FIFA World Cup for a second consecutive time.

== Career statistics ==
=== Club ===
As of match played 23 May 2021

Appearances and goals by club, season and competition
Club	Season	League			National cup		Continental		Other		Total	
Club	Season	Division	Apps	Goals	Apps	Goals	Apps	Goals	Apps	Goals	Apps	Goals
Cementarnica 55	2009–10	2. MFL	11	2	0	0	—		—		11	2
Inter Zaprešić	2010–11	1. HNL	15	4	0	0	—		—		15	4
Zulte Waregem	2011–12	Belgian Pro League	17	2	1	1	—		6 (Note: Appearance(s) in Belgian Pro League Playoffs)	1	24	4
Zulte Waregem	2012–13	Belgian Pro League	19	3	3	0	—		5	0	27	3
Zulte Waregem	2013–14	Belgian Pro League	2	0	0	0	3 (Note: One appearance in UEFA Champions League, two appearances in UEFA Europa League)	0	—		5	0
Zulte Waregem	2014–15	Belgian Pro League	27	3	4	1	3 (Note: Appearance(s) in UEFA Europa League)	0	6	2	40	6
Zulte Waregem	Total		65	8	8	2	6	0	17	3	96	13
Mechelen (loan)	2013–14	Belgian Pro League	16	1	1	0	—		6	2	23	3
Palermo	2015–16	Serie A	32	3	1	1	—		—		33	4
Palermo	2016–17	Serie A	11	1	0	0	—		—		11	1
Palermo	2017–18	Serie B	27	4	2	3	—		4 (Note: Appearance(s) in Serie B Playoffs)	0	33	7
Palermo	2018–19	Serie B	34	8	2	0	—		—		36	8
Palermo	Total		104	16	5	4	—		4	0	113	20
Mallorca	2019–20	La Liga	14	0	3	0	—		—		17	0
Mallorca	2020–21	Segunda División	9	0	2	1	—		—		11	1
Mallorca	Total		23	0	5	1	—		—		28	1
Career total			234	31	19	7	6	0	27	5	286	43

=== International ===
As of match played 13 November 2025

Appearances and goals by national team and year
National team	Year	Apps	Goals
North Macedonia	2011	4	0
North Macedonia	2012	1	0
North Macedonia	2013	9	2
North Macedonia	2014	6	1
North Macedonia	2015	8	4
North Macedonia	2016	3	1
North Macedonia	2017	8	3
North Macedonia	2018	8	4
North Macedonia	2019	7	0
North Macedonia	2020	6	0
North Macedonia	2021	14	4
North Macedonia	2022	7	1
North Macedonia	2023	5	1
North Macedonia	2024	5	0
North Macedonia	2025	7	3
Total		98	24

Scores and results list North Macedonia's goal tally first, score column indicates score after each Trajkovski goal.

List of international goals scored by Aleksandar Trajkovski
No.	Date	Venue	Opponent	Score	Result	Competition
1	14 August 2013	Philip II Arena, Skopje, Macedonia	Bulgaria	2–0	2–0	Friendly
2	6 September 2013	Philip II Arena, Skopje, Macedonia	Wales	2–1	2–1	2014 FIFA World Cup qualification
3	9 October 2014	Philip II Arena, Skopje, Macedonia	Luxembourg	1–0	3–2	UEFA Euro 2016 qualification
4	27 March 2015	Philip II Arena, Skopje, Macedonia	Belarus	1–0	1–2	UEFA Euro 2016 qualification
5	12 November 2015	Philip II Arena, Skopje, Macedonia	Montenegro	2–0	4–1	Friendly
6	12 November 2015	Philip II Arena, Skopje, Macedonia	Montenegro	3–0	4–1	Friendly
7	12 November 2015	Philip II Arena, Skopje, Macedonia	Montenegro	4–0	4–1	Friendly
8	2 June 2016	Philip II Arena, Skopje, Macedonia	Iran	1–1	1–3	Friendly
9	5 September 2017	Stadion Mladost, Strumica, Macedonia	Albania	1–1	1–1	2018 FIFA World Cup qualification
10	6 October 2017	Stadio Olimpico Grande Torino, Turin, Italy	Italy	1–1	1–1	2018 FIFA World Cup qualification
11	9 October 2017	Stadion Mladost, Strumica, Macedonia	Liechtenstein	2–0	4–0	2018 FIFA World Cup qualification
12	27 March 2018	Mardan Sports Complex, Antalya, Turkey	Azerbaijan	1–1	1–1	Friendly
13	13 October 2018	Philip II Arena, Skopje, North Macedonia	Liechtenstein	1–0	4–1	2018–19 UEFA Nations League D
14	13 October 2018	Philip II Arena, Skopje, North Macedonia	Liechtenstein	2–0	4–1	2018–19 UEFA Nations League D
15	19 November 2018	Philip II Arena, Skopje, North Macedonia	Gibraltar	4–0	4–0	2018–19 UEFA Nations League D
16	25 March 2021	Arena Națională, Bucharest, Romania	Romania	2–2	2–3	2022 FIFA World Cup qualification
17	28 March 2021	Toše Proeski Arena, Skopje, North Macedonia	Liechtenstein	2–0	5–0	2022 FIFA World Cup qualification
18	28 March 2021	Toše Proeski Arena, Skopje, North Macedonia	Liechtenstein	3–0	5–0	2022 FIFA World Cup qualification
19	11 November 2021	Vazgen Sargsyan Republican Stadium, Yerevan, Armenia	Armenia	1–0	5–0	2022 FIFA World Cup qualification
20	24 March 2022	Stadio Renzo Barbera, Palermo, Italy	Italy	1–0	1–0	2022 FIFA World Cup qualification
21	17 October 2023	Stadion Blagoj Istatov, Strumica, North Macedonia	Armenia	1–0	3–1	Friendly
22	22 March 2025	Rheinpark Stadion, Vaduz, Liechtenstein	Liechtenstein	1–0	3–0	2026 FIFA World Cup qualification
23	9 June 2025	Astana Arena, Astana, Kazakhstan	Kazakhstan	1–0	1–0	2026 FIFA World Cup qualification
24	4 September 2025	FK Viktoria Stadion, Prague, Czech Republic	Saudi Arabia	1–0	1–2	Friendly

== Honours ==
Al-Fayha

- King Cup: 2021–22
