= Davide Bianchi =

Italian football player (born 1996)

Personal information
- Date of birth: 11 May 1996 (age 30)
- Place of birth: Mantua, Italy
- Height: 1.78 m (5 ft 10 in)
- Position: Right back

Team information
- Current team: Montecchio Maggiore

Youth career
- –2015: Chievo

Senior career*
| Years | Team | Apps | (Gls) |
| 2015–2020 | Vicenza | 61 | (0) |
| 2020–2022 | Mantova | 43 | (0) |
| 2022–2023 | Ambrosiana | | |
| 2023–2024 | Vigasio | | |
| 2024– | Montecchio Maggiore | 6 | (0) |
- * Club domestic league appearances and goals as of 10 November 2024

Davide Bianchi (born 11 May 1996) is an Italian football player who plays as a right back for Serie D club Montecchio Maggiore.

== Club career ==
He made his professional debut in the Serie B for Vicenza Calcio on 20 May 2016 in a game against Perugia.

After the bankruptcy of Vicenza Calcio, he was re-signed by their phoenix club LR Vicenza in July 2018.

On 19 August 2020 he signed with Mantova.
