= Giuseppe Bellusci =

Italian football player (born 1989)

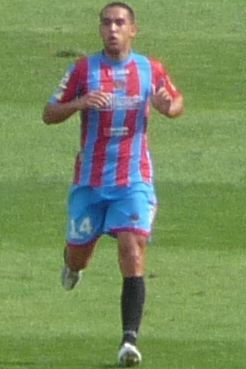
- Bellusci with Catania in 2009

Personal information
- Full name: Giuseppe Bellusci
- Date of birth: 21 August 1989 (age 37)
- Place of birth: Trebisacce, Italy
- Height: 1.85 m (6 ft 1 in)
- Position: Centre-back

Team information
- Current team: Recanatese
- Number: 66

Youth career
- Ascoli

Senior career*
| Years | Team | Apps | (Gls) |
| 2006–2009 | Ascoli | 35 | (1) |
| 2009–2014 | Catania | 99 | (0) |
| 2014–2017 | Leeds United | 57 | (2) |
| 2016–2017 | → Empoli (loan) | 33 | (1) |
| 2017–2019 | Palermo | 55 | (1) |
| 2019–2022 | Monza | 50 | (0) |
| 2022 | → Ascoli (loan) | 18 | (0) |
| 2022–2024 | Ascoli | 48 | (2) |
| 2024– | Recanatese | 7 | (0) |

International career
| 2009–2010 | Italy U21 | 6 | (0) |
- * Club domestic league appearances and goals as of 10 November 2024

Giuseppe Bellusci (born 21 August 1989) is an Italian professional football player who plays as a centre-back for Serie D club Recanatese.

A former Italy under-21 international, Bellusci was nicknamed "The Warrior" by Catania fans.

== Club career ==
=== Leeds United ===
==== 2014–15 season ====
On 12 August 2014, Bellusci signed a one-year loan deal with the option of a permanent deal with English club Leeds United. His debut was delayed due to the Italian bank holiday Ferragosto on 15 August, leading to international clearance not arriving in time for the following day's fixture against Middlesbrough. On 21 August 2014, Bellusci signed a permanent deal with Leeds United until June 2018, for a fee of around £1.6 million.

On 23 August, Bellusci made his Leeds debut against Watford in a 4–1 defeat at Vicarage Road, with Bellusci giving away a penalty and earning a straight red card. Bellusci made his home debut at Elland Road, on his return from suspension on 30 August, against Bolton Wanderers. He scored his first goal in England on 16 September 2014 with a free-kick against Bournemouth in a 3–1 win. On 4 October, Bellusci equalised with a left-footed volley in a 1–1 draw against Sheffield Wednesday.

On 22 December, Bellusci was charged by The FA on an allegation of using racist language towards Norwich City striker Cameron Jerome during the teams' 1–1 draw on 21 October; Bellusci and Leeds United denied the allegations. On 7 February 2015, at an FA hearing, Bellusci was found 'not guilty', as he had threatened Jerome in Italian to give him a black eye, with the word nero being misheard.

On 20 January, Bellusci was given a straight red card when he gave away a penalty against Bournemouth, however pictures showed the foul to be outside the box, Bournemouth striker Yann Kermorgant missed the resulting penalty to earn Leeds a 1–0 victory. The red card was Bellusci's second red card of the season which resulted in an automatic two-match ban.

On 18 April 2015, Bellusci was one of six Massimo Cellino signings (alongside Mirco Antenucci, Marco Silvestri, Souleymane Doukara, Dario Del Fabro, Edgar Çani) who controversially pulled out of the squad with an 'injury' the day before a 2–1 loss against Charlton Athletic.

On 2 May 2015, Bellusci's free-kick against Bournemouth was nominated for Leeds United's goal of the season at the official end of 2014–15 season awards ceremony, but lost out to eventual winner Rudy Austin's volleyed goal against Watford.

==== 2015–16 season ====
On 2 July 2015, Bellusci's agent Silvio Pagliari revealed that Bellusci and Antenucci would be staying at Leeds and that owner Massimo Cellino said both players were going to be important players for the 2015–16 season.

On 27 September 2015, Bellusci scored an own goal for Leeds in a 3–0 defeat to Middlesbrough at the Riverside. On 7 January 2016, Leeds manager Steve Evans revealed that the club had rejected two bids from overseas sides for Bellusci and that he wanted to keep him at the club.

Bellusci's costly error against Rotherham United led to a red card for goalkeeper Marco Silvestri and resulted in Bellusci playing the rest of the match in goal for Leeds, with Evans' side out of substitutions, Bellusci was also unable to save the resulting penalty in a 2–1 defeat. In the following game, Bellusci gave away an injury time penalty which was converted by Queens Park Rangers player Tjaronn Chery.

After a series of high-profile mistakes throughout the season and unrest with the crowd, Bellusci was dropped from the squad by head coach Steve Evans after walking out of the training ground after learning he was due to be a substitute in the match against Hull City on 23 April. Bellusci also took to Twitter to post statistics as to argue the Leeds defence was more solid with him in the team rather than his other teammates.

Bellusci remained absent from the final three Leeds squads of the 2015–16 season named by Steve Evans.

==== Loan to Empoli ====
On 1 July 2016, with Bellusci missing the beginning of pre-season for Leeds United for 'personal reasons', he returned to Italy, joining Serie A side Empoli on loan for the 2016/17 season with the option of a permanent deal. He made his Empoli debut against Udinese on 28 August in a 2–0 defeat. On 12 September, Bellusci scored the winner for Empoli in their Serie A game against Crotone in a 2–1 victory. Empoli were relegated to Serie B with Bellusci playing 33 games for the side.

=== Return to Leeds ===
On 6 June 2017, with Leeds United beginning pre-season under new head coach Thomas Christiansen, it was announced that Bellusci was seeking a transfer away from Leeds and would not return to the club for the start of pre-season after being granted extra leave to find a new club. On 5 July, after being unable to find a new club, Bellusci returned to the side and played for Leeds in their first pre-season friendly in a 4–2 win against Harrogate Town.

On 8 July 2017, Bellusci was booed by the travelling Leeds fans in their 5–1 pre-season victory over Guiseley, after being substituted at half time, Bellusci was embroiled in an argument when walking past the Leeds support who were chanting him to leave the club. Bellusci later tweeted "Fortunately in this world we have the children to set an example to the adults!"

After new head coach Thomas Christiansen revealed Bellusci would not be part of his plans, on 18 July 2017, Leeds announced the termination of Bellusci's contract by mutual consent.

=== Palermo ===
On 30 July 2017, Bellusci signed for Serie B side Palermo signing a 3-year contract with the club.

=== Monza ===
Following Palermo's bankruptcy, on 25 July 2019 he signed a 3-year contract with Monza.

=== Ascoli ===
On 4 January 2022, Bellusci was loaned out to Ascoli for six months. He joined them on a permanent deal on 10 July.

== International career ==
On 25 March 2009, he made his debut with the Italy U21 team in a friendly match against Austria. Bellusci played with future Italy internationals such as Mario Balotelli and Andrea Ranocchia during his time with the under-21 team.

== Career statistics ==
=== Club ===
As of match played 22 August 2021

| Club | Season | League | | | National cup | | League cup | | Other | | Total | |
| Club | Season | Division | Apps | Goals | Apps | Goals | Apps | Goals | Apps | Goals | Apps | Goals |
|---|---|---|---|---|---|---|---|---|---|---|---|---|
| Catania | 2009–10 | Serie A | 2 | 0 | 0 | 0 | — | | 0 | 0 | 2 | 0 |
| Catania | 2010–11 | Serie A | 9 | 0 | 0 | 0 | — | | 0 | 0 | 9 | 0 |
| Catania | 2011–12 | Serie A | 32 | 0 | 0 | 0 | — | | 0 | 0 | 32 | 0 |
| Catania | 2012–13 | Serie A | 26 | 0 | 0 | 0 | — | | 0 | 0 | 26 | 0 |
| Catania | 2013–14 | Serie A | 20 | 0 | 0 | 0 | — | | 0 | 0 | 20 | 0 |
| Catania | Total | | 89 | 0 | 0 | 0 | 0 | 0 | 0 | 0 | 89 | 0 |
| Leeds United | 2014–15 | Championship | 30 | 2 | 0 | 0 | 0 | 0 | 0 | 0 | 30 | 2 |
| Leeds United | 2015–16 | Championship | 27 | 0 | 3 | 0 | 1 | 0 | 0 | 0 | 31 | 0 |
| Leeds United | Total | | 57 | 2 | 3 | 0 | 1 | 0 | 0 | 0 | 61 | 2 |
| Empoli (loan) | 2016–17 | Serie A | 33 | 1 | 0 | 0 | — | | 0 | 0 | 33 | 1 |
| Palermo | 2017–18 | Serie B | 25 | 0 | 2 | 0 | — | | 0 | 0 | 27 | 0 |
| Palermo | 2018–19 | Serie B | 30 | 1 | 2 | 0 | — | | 0 | 0 | 32 | 1 |
| Palermo | Total | | 55 | 1 | 4 | 0 | 0 | 0 | 0 | 0 | 59 | 1 |
| Monza | 2019–20 | Serie C | 19 | 0 | 3 | 1 | — | | 0 | 0 | 22 | 1 |
| Monza | 2020–21 | Serie B | 30 | 0 | 2 | 0 | — | | 1 (Note: Appearance in Serie B promotion play-offs) | 0 | 33 | 0 |
| Monza | 2021–22 | Serie B | 1 | 0 | 1 | 0 | — | | — | | 2 | 0 |
| Monza | Total | | 50 | 0 | 6 | 1 | 0 | 0 | 1 | 0 | 57 | 1 |
| Career total | | | 284 | 4 | 13 | 1 | 1 | 0 | 1 | 0 | 299 | 5 |

== Honours ==
Monza

- Serie C Group A: 2019–20
