= Rosario Damiano Maddaloni =

Italian footballer

Rosario Maddaloni
Personal information
- Full name: Rosario Damiano Maddaloni
- Date of birth: 2 July 1998 (age 28)
- Place of birth: Palermo, Italy
- Height: 1.85 m (6 ft 1 in)
- Position: Centre back

Team information
- Current team: USD Fezzanese
- Number: 19

Youth career
- –2017: Palermo

Senior career*
| Years | Team | Apps | (Gls) |
| 2017–2019 | Palermo | 0 | (0) |
| 2017–2018 | → Fano (loan) | 2 | (0) |
| 2018–2019 | → Rende (loan) | 10 | (0) |
| 2019–2022 | Cesena | 33 | (0) |
| 2022–2023 | Lucchese | 6 | (0) |
| 2023 | Imolese | 13 | (0) |
| 2023–2024 | Potenza | 13 | (2) |
| 2024–2025 | Fidelis Andria | 11 | (1) |
| 2025–2026 | Igea Virtus | 26 | (0) |
| 2026– | USD Fezzanese | 0 | (0) |
- * Club domestic league appearances and goals as of 13 November 2026

Rosario Damiano Maddaloni (born 2 July 1998) is an Italian footballer who plays as a centre back for Italian Serie D club USD Fezzanese.

== Club career ==
He made his Serie C debut for Fano on 17 September 2017 in a game against FeralpiSalò.

On 22 August 2018, he joined Serie C club Rende on a season-long loan. Rende had a buyout option at the end of the season.

On 25 July 2019 he signed a 2-year contract with Cesena.

On 26 August 2022, Maddaloni moved to Lucchese. On 24 January 2023, he joined Imolese.

On 25 July 2023, Maddaloni signed a one-season contract with Potenza.
