= Corentin Fiore =

Belgian footballer of Italian descent

Personal information
- Date of birth: 24 March 1995 (age 31)
- Place of birth: Carnières, Belgium
- Height: 1.83 m (6 ft 0 in)
- Position: Left-back

Team information
- Current team: RAAL La Louvière
- Number: 3

Youth career
- –2013: Standard Liège

Senior career*
Years	Team	Apps	(Gls)
2013–2017	Standard Liège	42	(0)
2018–2019	Palermo	2	(0)
2018–2019	→ Imolese (loan)	31	(0)
2019	Cercle Brugge	5	(0)
2020	Teramo	2	(0)
2021	Ravenna	11	(0)
2021–	RAAL La Louvière	36	(4)

International career^{‡}
2010–2011	Belgium U16	11	(4)
2011–2012	Belgium U17	9	(0)
2013–2014	Belgium U19	15	(1)
2015–2016	Belgium U21	5	(0)
- * Club domestic league appearances and goals as of 10 November 2022 ‡ National team caps and goals as of 19:53, 11 October 2016 (UTC)

Corentin Fiore (born 24 March 1995) is a Belgian professional footballer who plays for Belgian Division 2 club RAAL La Louvière. He plays as a left-back.

== Club career ==
Fiore is a youth exponent from Standard Liège. On 11 December 2014, he made his senior debut against Feyenoord Rotterdam in the UEFA Europa League. Standard manager Ivan Vukomanović gave him a place in his starting line-up.

On 9 January 2018 he signed with Palermo. After making only three appearances with the Rosanero (two at Serie B level during the final part of the 2017–18 season, plus one in a 2018–19 Coppa Italia game against Vicenza), he was loaned out to Serie C club Imolese for the remainder of the 2018–19 season.

After Palermo's exclusion from Serie B, he was signed as a free agent by Cercle Brugge.

On 16 January 2020, he returned to Italy, signing with Teramo.

On 4 January 2021 he signed with Ravenna.

On 27 August 2021, he returned to Belgium and signed with fourth-tier Belgian Division 2 club RAAL La Louvière.

== Career statistics ==
As of match played 27 December 2017

Appearances and goals by club, season and competition
Club	Season	League			National Cup		Europe		Other		Total	
Club	Season	Division	Apps	Goals	Apps	Goals	Apps	Goals	Apps	Goals	Apps	Goals
Standard Liège	2014–15	Pro League	1	0	0	0	1 (Note: Appearances in the Europa League)	0	—		2	0
Standard Liège	2015–16	Pro League	22	0	3	0	1	0	—		26	0
Standard Liège	2016–17	First Division A	14	0	1	0	4	0	3 (Note: Appearances in the Europa League play-offs)	0	22	0
Standard Liège	Total		37	0	4	0	6	0	3	0	50	0
Palermo	2017–18	Serie B	2	0	0	0	—		—		2	0
Palermo	2018–19	Serie B	0	0	1	0	—		—		1	0
Imolese	2018–19	Serie C	31	0	0	0	—		—		0	0
Career total			39	0	5	0	6	0	3	0	53	0
