= Lorenzo Gonnelli =

Italian footballer

Personal information
- Date of birth: 28 June 1993 (age 33)
- Place of birth: Livorno, Italy
- Height: 1.84 m (6 ft 0 in)
- Position: Centre back

Team information
- Current team: Grosseto

Senior career*
Years	Team	Apps	(Gls)
2012–2014	Pontedera	58	(1)
2014–2020	Livorno	101	(2)
2020	→ Alessandria (loan)	3	(0)
2020–2022	Cesena	41	(0)
2022–2025	Cerignola	55	(0)
2023	→ Picerno (loan)	11	(0)
2025–	Grosseto	0	(0)
- * Club domestic league appearances and goals as of 27 April 2025

Lorenzo Gonnelli (born 28 June 1993) is an Italian footballer who plays as a defender for Serie D club Grosseto.

== Club career ==
On 31 January 2020, he joined Alessandria on loan until the end of the season.

On 5 October 2020 he signed a three-year contract with Cesena.

On 24 August 2022, Gonnelli moved to Cerignola.

On 31 January 2023, Gonnelli joined Picerno on loan.
