= Roberto Pirrello =

Italian footballer

Personal information
- Date of birth: 30 May 1996 (age 30)
- Place of birth: Alcamo, Italy
- Height: 1.90 m (6 ft 3 in)
- Position: Centre-back

Team information
- Current team: Team Altamura
- Number: 31

Youth career
- Palermo

Senior career*
Years	Team	Apps	(Gls)
2015–2019	Palermo	9	(1)
2016	→ Livorno (loan)	0	(0)
2016–2017	→ Siracusa (loan)	29	(1)
2017–2018	→ Livorno (loan)	27	(1)
2019–2022	Empoli	9	(0)
2020	→ Trapani (loan)	13	(0)
2021–2022	→ Cosenza (loan)	7	(0)
2022–2023	Pordenone	23	(2)
2023–2025	Gubbio	43	(1)
2025	→ Padova (loan)	6	(0)
2025–2026	Trapani	33	(0)
2026–	Team Altamura	2	(0)

International career^{‡}
2012	Italy U-16	1	(0)
2013	Italy U-17	1	(0)
- * Club domestic league appearances and goals as of 29 August 2026 ‡ National team caps and goals as of 28 October 2013

Roberto Pirrello (born 30 May 1996) is an Italian professional footballer who plays as a centre-back for Serie C Group C club Team Altamura.

== Club career ==
Pirrello made his professional debut in the Lega Pro for Siracusa on 11 September 2016 in a game against Taranto.

He was successively part of the Livorno squad that won the Serie C league in 2018. He returned to Palermo for the 2018–19 Serie B season.

=== Empoli ===
On 18 July 2019, Pirrello signed to Serie B club Empoli for free. On 29 January 2020, he was loaned to Trapani. On 31 August 2021, he moved to Cosenza on loan.

=== Pordenone ===
On 12 July 2022, Pirrello signed a four-year contract with Pordenone.

=== Padova ===
On 17 January 2025, Pirrello moved on loan to Padova, with an option to buy.

== International ==
He represented Italy national under-17 football team at the 2013 FIFA U-17 World Cup.
