= Simone Giuliano =

Italian footballer

Personal information
- Date of birth: 28 April 1997 (age 29)
- Place of birth: Palermo, Italy
- Height: 1.80 m (5 ft 11 in)
- Position: Left back

Team information
- Current team: Trapani

Youth career
- –2016: Palermo

Senior career*
Years	Team	Apps	(Gls)
2016–2019	Palermo	0	(0)
2017–2018	→ Sicula Leonzio (loan)	3	(0)
2018–2019	→ Pro Piacenza (loan)	0	(0)
2019–2021	Marina di Ragusa	52	(3)
2021	Città di Sant'Agata	14	(1)
2021–2023	Don Carlo Misilmeri		
2023–2024	Athletic Palermo		
2024–2026	Gela	32	(1)
2026–	Trapani	0	(0)

International career
2013–2014	Italy U-17	11	(0)
2014–2015	Italy U-18	2	(0)
2016	Italy U-19	1	(0)
- * Club domestic league appearances and goals as of 3 May 2026

Simone Giuliano (born 28 April 1997) is an Italian footballer who plays as a left back for Serie D club Trapani.

== Club career ==
He made his Serie C debut for Sicula Leonzio on 2 September 2017 in a game against Matera.
