= Andrea Rispoli =

Italian footballer (born 1956)

Personal information
- Date of birth: 29 September 1988 (age 38)
- Place of birth: Cava de' Tirreni, Italy
- Height: 1.98 m (6 ft 6 in)
- Position: Right-back

Youth career
- Brescia

Senior career*
Years	Team	Apps	(Gls)
2001–2010	Brescia	53	(8)
2010–2015	Parma	14	(0)
2010–2011	→ Lecce (loan)	13	(0)
2011–2012	→ Sampdoria (loan)	30	(0)
2012–2013	→ Padova (loan)	31	(1)
2013–2014	→ Ternana (loan)	34	(4)
2015	→ Palermo (loan)	15	(0)
2015–2019	Palermo	118	(12)
2019–2020	Lecce	28	(0)
2020–2021	Crotone	19	(0)
2021–2022	Parma	20	(0)
2022–2024	Cosenza	43	(1)
2024–2025	Crotone	26	(1)

International career^{‡}
2009–2010	Italy U-21	4	(1)
- * Club domestic league appearances and goals as of 19 April 2025 ‡ National team caps and goals as of 12 October 2010

Andrea Rispoli (born 29 September 1988) is an Italian footballer who plays as a right-back.

== Career ==
=== Brescia ===
Born in Cava de' Tirreni, Campania, Rispoli started his professional career at Brescia Calcio. Having played for the reserve team from 2005 to 2008, he made his professional debut with the first team during the 2007–08 Serie B season.

=== Parma and loans ===
In January 2010, Rispoli was sold to Parma F.C. in a co-ownership deal for €3.5 million, on a 4 1/2-year contract. Concurrently, Alessandro Budel and Nicolás Córdova moved to Brescia in a co-ownership deal for €2.5 million and €1 million respectively, who were free agents 1 1/2 years ago. Rispoli returned to Brescia on loan until 30 June 2010.

On 30 August 2010, Rispoli left for fellow Serie A team U.S. Lecce on loan along with Manuel Coppola. In June 2011, both Brescia and Parma gave up the retained registration rights to the opposite side for free.

On 1 July 2011, Rispoli and Paolo Castellini were exchanged with Jonathan Biabiany.

After Sampdoria did not buy him, on 3 July 2012 he left for Calcio Padova, once more on loan.

=== Palermo ===
On 2 February 2015, he moved to Palermo in a temporary deal, with an option to purchase. At the end of year he was released from Parma, due to the club's bankruptcy, and signed a four-year contract with Palermo.

He was released on 30 June 2019 after his expiring contract was not renewed; soon afterwards, Palermo was excluded from Serie B.

=== Lecce ===
On 13 August 2019, Rispoli signed Serie A club Lecce.

=== Crotone ===
On 8 September 2020, Rispoli signed a 2-year contract with Crotone. On 31 August 2021, the contract was terminated by mutual consent.

=== Return to Parma ===
On 9 December 2021, he returned to Parma in Serie B.

=== Cosenza ===
On 9 July 2022, Rispoli signed with Cosenza in Serie B.

=== Return to Crotone ===
On 1 February 2024, Rispoli returned to Crotone on a 1.5-year deal. That was his first Serie C club.

== International career ==
On 12 August 2009, Rispoli made his debut with the Italy U-21 scoring a goal in the friendly against Russia. He played the second round of 2011 UEFA European Under-21 Football Championship qualification, against Luxembourg as a sub of Mattia Mustacchio. He returned to the squad for the play-offs.

== Career statistics ==
As of match played 1 June 2023

Appearances and goals by club, season and competition
Club	Season	League			National Cup		Other		Total	
Club	Season	Division	Apps	Goals	Apps	Goals	Apps	Goals	Apps	Goals
Brescia	2007–08	Serie B	5	1	0	0	—		5	1
Brescia	2008–09	Serie B	17	1	0	0	4 (Note: Appearances in the Serie B playoff)	1	21	2
Brescia	2009–10	Serie B	31	5	1	0	4	0	36	5
Brescia	Total		53	7	1	0	8	1	62	8
Lecce (loan)	2010–11	Serie A	13	0	1	0	—		14	0
Sampdoria (loan)	2011–12	Serie B	30	0	0	0	4	0	34	0
Padova (loan)	2012–13	Serie B	31	1	1	0	—		32	1
Ternana (loan)	2013–14	Serie B	34	4	0	0	—		34	4
Parma	2014–15	Serie A	14	0	2	1	—		16	1
Palermo (loan)	2014–15	Serie A	15	0	0	0	—		15	0
Palermo	2015–16	Serie A	22	0	2	0	—		24	0
Palermo	2016–17	Serie A	32	6	1	0	—		33	6
Palermo	2017–18	Serie B	38	6	1	0	4	0	43	6
Palermo	2018–19	Serie B	22	0	0	0	—		22	0
Palermo	Total		129	12	4	0	4	0	137	12
Lecce	2019–20	Serie A	28	0	1	0	—		29	0
Crotone	2020–21	Serie A	19	0	1	0	—		19	0
Parma	2021–22	Serie B	20	0	0	0	—		20	0
Cosenza	2022–23	Serie B	30	1	1	0	1 (Note: Appearance in the Serie B playout)	0	31	1
Career Total			401	25	12	1	17	1	430	27
