= Carlos Embaló =

Bissau-Guinean footballer

Personal information
- Full name: Carlos Apna Embaló
- Date of birth: 25 November 1994 (age 31)
- Place of birth: Bissau, Guinea-Bissau
- Height: 1.80 m (5 ft 11 in)
- Positions: Winger; forward

Team information
- Current team: Scafatese

Youth career
- –2013: Chaves
- 2013–2014: Palermo

Senior career*
Years	Team	Apps	(Gls)
2012–2013	Chaves	2	(0)
2014–2019	Palermo	32	(1)
2014–2015	→ Carpi (loan)	3	(0)
2015	→ Lecce (loan)	11	(0)
2015–2016	→ Brescia (loan)	40	(5)
2018	→ Brescia (loan)	12	(0)
2019	→ Cosenza (loan)	13	(2)
2019–2022	Eupen	31	(2)
2021	→ Alcorcón (loan)	2	(0)
2022–2023	Cittadella	18	(0)
2023–2024	Foggia	16	(3)
2024–	Scafatese	0	(0)

International career^{‡}
2018–2020	Guinea-Bissau	3	(1)
- * Club domestic league appearances and goals as of 5 May 2024 ‡ National team caps and goals as of 8 September 2018

Carlos Apna Embaló (born 25 November 1994) is a Bissau-Guinean footballer who plays as a winger or forward for Italian Serie D club Scafatese.

== Club career ==
Embalo was bought by Palermo from Portuguese team Chaves. Rosanero then loaned Embalo to Carpi. On 13 September 2014, Embaló made his professional debut with Carpi in a 2014–15 Serie B match against Crotone. After his loan period end, Palermo loaned him to Lecce and Brescia.

On 15 June 2016, Palermo officially announced the contract extension with Embalo until 30 June 2020.

On 25 January 2019, he joined Cosenza on loan until the end of the 2018–19 season.

After Palermo's exclusion from Italian football, he left Italy for Belgium by joining Eupen. On 29 January 2021, he joined Spanish club AD Alcorcón on loan for the remainder of the 2020–21 Segunda División season.

On 23 June 2022, Embaló returned to Italy and signed with Serie B side Cittadella.

On 1 September 2023, Embaló moved to Foggia.

== International career ==
=== International stats ===
As of 11 November 2020

National team	Year	Apps	Goals
Guinea-Bissau	2018	2	1
Guinea-Bissau	2019	0	0
Guinea-Bissau	2020	1	0
Total		7	0

=== International goals ===
Scores and results list Guinea-Bissau's goal tally first.

No.	Date	Venue	Opponent	Score	Result	Competition
1.	8 September 2018	Estádio do Zimpeto, Maputo, Mozambique	Mozambique	1–1	2–2	2019 Africa Cup of Nations qualification
