= Daniele Sciaudone =

Italian footballer (born 1988)

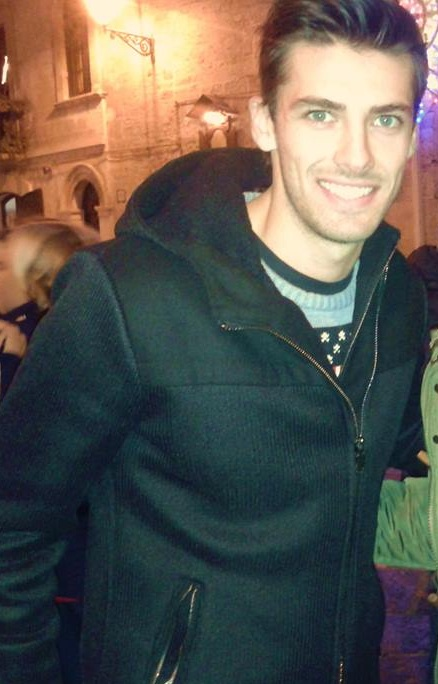

Personal information
- Date of birth: 10 August 1988 (age 38)
- Place of birth: Bergamo, Italy
- Height: 1.83 m (6 ft 0 in)
- Position: Midfielder

Team information
- Current team: Fidelis Andria
- Number: 8

Youth career
- Tritium

Senior career*
Years	Team	Apps	(Gls)
2005–2007	Tritium	48	(2)
2007–2009	Taranto	24	(1)
2009–2011	Foligno	63	(14)
2011–2012	Taranto	29	(3)
2012–2015	Bari	96	(11)
2015	→ Catania (loan)	18	(2)
2015–2016	Salernitana	16	(0)
2016	→ Spezia (loan)	21	(3)
2016–2017	Spezia	33	(2)
2017–2019	Novara	52	(1)
2019	→ Cosenza (loan)	16	(5)
2019–2021	Cosenza	65	(5)
2021–2023	Reggiana	50	(2)
2023–	Fidelis Andria	0	(0)
- * Club domestic league appearances and goals as of 16:26, 1 October 2023 (UTC)

Daniele Sciaudone (born 10 August 1988) is an Italian professional footballer who plays as a midfielder for Serie D club Fidelis Andria.

== Club career ==
Born in Bergamo, Sciaudone finished his youth formation with local Tritium, making his senior debuts with the side in Serie D. In 2007, he joined Taranto in Serie C1.

In August 2009 Sciaudone joined fellow third-divisioner Foligno. After two years as a starter he returned to Foligno, playing a key part for the side who finished second but was relegated, however.

On 4 July 2012 Sciaudone moved to Serie B side Bari. On 25 August he made his division debut, coming on as a second-half substitute in a 2–1 home success over Cittadella; he scored his first goal came on 27 October, netting his side's only in a 1–1 draw at Padova.

=== Salernitana ===
On 6 August 2015 he was signed by Salernitana in a 3-year contract.

=== Spezia ===
On 30 January 2016 Sciaudone left for Spezia on loan, with an option to purchase. He picked no.7 shirt from departing Miguel de las Cuevas.

=== Novara ===
On 31 August 2017, Sciaudone was sold to Novara, with Francesco Bolzoni moved to opposite direction.

==== Loan to Cosenza ====
On 26 January 2019, he joined Cosenza on loan until the end of the 2018–19 season.

=== Cosenza ===
On 23 July 2019, he moved to Cosenza on a permanent basis, signing a 2-year contract.

=== Reggiana ===
On 26 August 2021, he signed a two-year contract with Reggiana.

=== Fidelis Andria ===
On 30 September 2023, after his contract with Reggiana had expired, Sciaudone signed for Serie D club Fidelis Andria on a free transfer.

== Career statistics ==
As of match played on 17 March 2018

Appearances and goals by club, season and competition
Club	Season	League			Cup		League Cup		Other		Total	
Club	Season	Division	Apps	Goals	Apps	Goals	Apps	Goals	Apps	Goals	Apps	Goals
Foligno	2009–10	Lega Pro Prima Divisione	30	7	0	0	—				30	7
Foligno	2010–11	Lega Pro Prima Divisione	33	7	2	1	—				35	8
Foligno	Total		63	14	2	1	0	0	0	0	65	15
Taranto	2011–12	Lega Pro Prima Divisione	29	3	2	0	—				31	3
Bari	2012–13	Serie B	35	4	1	0	—				36	4
Bari	2013–14	Serie B	42	5	2	0	—				44	5
Bari	2014–15	Serie B	19	2	2	0	—				21	2
Bari	Total		96	11	5	0	0	0	0	0	101	11
Catania (loan)	2014–15	Serie B	18	2	0	0	—				18	2
Salernitana	2015–16	Serie B	16	0	2	0	—				18	0
Spezia (loan)	2015–16	Serie B	21	3	0	0	—				21	3
Spezia	2016–17	Serie B	32	2	3	0	—				35	2
Spezia	2017–18	Serie B	1	0	2	1	—				3	1
Spezia	Total		33	2	5	1	0	0	0	0	38	3
Novara	2017–18	Serie B	25	1	0	0	—				25	1
Career totals			301	36	16	2	0	0	0	0	317	38
