= Gennaro Ruggiero =

Italian footballer

Personal information
- Date of birth: 4 February 2000 (age 26)
- Place of birth: Naples, Italy
- Height: 1.79 m (5 ft 10 1/2 in)
- Position: Central midfielder

Team information
- Current team: AS Melfi

Youth career
- –2014: Mariano Keller
- 2014–2018: Palermo
- 2017–2018: → Torino (loan)

Senior career*
Years	Team	Apps	(Gls)
2017–2019	Palermo	2	(0)
2019–2020	Livorno	10	(0)
2020–2021	Nola	11	(0)
2021–2022	San Giorgio	35	(0)
2023	Real Normanna	14	(1)
2023–2024	Juve Stabia	0	(0)
2024–	Real Normanna		
2025-	AS Melfi	15	(1)
- * Club domestic league appearances and goals as of 27 April 2024

Gennaro Ruggiero (born 4 February 2000) is an Italian footballer who plays for Melfi in the fifth-tier Eccellenza.

== Career ==
A physical central midfielder, and a product of Naples-based renowned youth team Mariano Keller, he was spotted by Palermo scouts and then signed in 2014.

He made his Serie A debut at the age of 17 on 14 May 2017, playing the entirety of a home league game against Genoa, and becoming the third footballer born from the year 2000 to play in the Italian top flight (after Moise Kean and Pietro Pellegri).

He was successively loaned out to Torino for the 2017–18 season but failed to make any first-team appearance during the season and appeared only for the Granata's U-19 team before returning to Palermo, again as part of the Under-19 team.

After a lone season with Serie B club Livorno, he was signed by Serie D club Nola as a free transfer in November 2020. On 7 August 2021, he moved to San Giorgio, another Serie D club from his native region of Campania. He was released by the end of the season, after San Giorgio folded following their relegation to Eccellenza.

After playing from January to June 2023 for Serie D amateurs Real Agro Aversa, Ruggiero was announced on 31 August 2023 as a new signing of Serie C club Juve Stabia until the end of the season.
