= Simone Lo Faso =

Italian footballer

Personal information
- Date of birth: 18 February 1998 (age 28)
- Place of birth: Palermo, Italy
- Height: 1.81 m (5 ft 11 in)
- Position: Forward

Team information
- Current team: Acireale
- Number: 10

Youth career
- 2006–2007: Vis Palermo
- 2007–2016: Palermo
- 2012–2014: → Siena (loan)

Senior career*
Years	Team	Apps	(Gls)
2016–2019	Palermo	12	(0)
2017–2018	→ Fiorentina (loan)	2	(0)
2019–2021	Lecce	1	(0)
2020	→ Cesena (loan)	3	(0)
2021	Pistoiese	5	(0)
2021–2022	Folgore Caratese	32	(4)
2022–2023	Livorno	25	(3)
2024	Siracusa	11	(0)
2024–2025	Akragas	20	(2)
2025–	Acireale	3	(1)

International career
2014–2015	Italy U17	10	(2)
2015–2016	Italy U18	7	(2)
2016–2017	Italy U19	5	(1)
2017	Italy U20	2	(1)
- * Club domestic league appearances and goals as of 18 January 2026

Simone Lo Faso (born 18 February 1998) is an Italian professional footballer who plays as a forward for Serie D club Acireale.

== Career ==
A technical second striker, Lo Faso joined the Palermo youth system at the age of 9. He made first team debut on 12 August 2016 during a Coppa Italia game against Bari. On 6 November 2016, he made Serie A debut in a match against AC Milan. He played a total of ten league games during the 2016–17 season.

In August 2017, he left Palermo to join Fiorentina on loan, with the right for the Viola to buy the player permanently by the end of the season. However, he only managed to make two short first-team appearances as a substitute throughout the whole 2017–18 Serie A campaign, and was mainly featured as part of the Under-19 team. In April 2018, he suffered a broken fibula, effectively ending the season and leading Fiorentina to renounce its transfer rights. He therefore rejoined Palermo for the club's 2018–19 Serie B season.

On 25 July 2019, he signed for Serie A club Lecce. He made a single appearance for Lecce in Coppa Italia. On 31 January 2020, he moved on loan to Cesena in Serie C, making only three appearances.

In January 2021, after spending the first half of the season back at Lecce, he left the club by mutual consent. On 25 February he joined Serie C side Pistoiese. After finding himself without a contract following his short stint at Pistoiese, on 14 September 2021 Lo Faso signed a deal with Serie D team Folgore Caratese.

After one season with Folgore Caratese, on 7 September 2022 Lo Faso signed for Serie D fallen giants Livorno. For the 2023–24 season, Lo Faso returned to Sicily, signing for Siracusa on 13 January 2024. He left the club by the end of the season, initially to join a seven-a-side football Kings League Italy. On 24 July 2024, Lo Faso signed for Akragas.
