= 2014–15 US Città di Palermo season =

Palermo
2014–15 season
- Chairman: Maurizio Zamparini
- Manager: Giuseppe Iachini
- Stadium: Stadio Renzo Barbera
- Serie A: 11th
- Coppa Italia: Third round
- Top goalscorer: League: Paulo Dybala (13); All: Paulo Dybala (13)
- Highest home attendance: 29,832 vs Juventus (14 March 2015, Serie A)
- Average home league attendance: 17,481
Home colours	Away colours	Third colours

U.S. Città di Palermo played the season 2014–15 in the Serie A league and Coppa Italia.

== Season overview ==
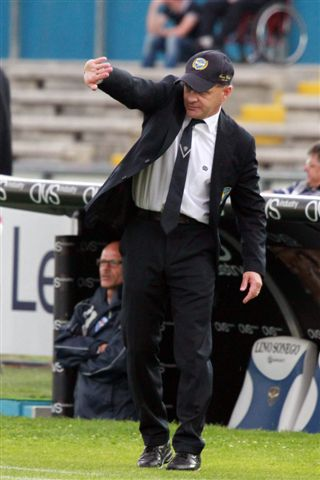
Giuseppe Iachini was confirmed as Palermo head coach after leading the Sicilians to a Serie B title the previous season.

After completing the 2013–14 Serie B season in first place, Giuseppe Iachini was confirmed as head coach. On the other hand, Giorgio Perinetti left the club after chairman Maurizio Zamparini hired Franco Ceravolo as new director of football. Igor Budan will also leave his role as team manager to fulfil a career as director of football himself. This was also followed by Abel Hernández's selection to the Uruguay squad for the 2014 FIFA World Cup, making him the only Palermo player to appear in the competition. Hernández himself was subsequently sold to Hull in what appeared one of the main transfer moves of the season, together with the sale of Kyle Lafferty to Norwich and the signing of two players scouted from the 2014 FIFA World Cup, Sol Bamba and Giancarlo González.

On its first official game, Palermo lost 0–3 at home to Serie B club Modena in the 2014–15 Coppa Italia third round, thus being immediately eliminated from the competition. A number of dismal results left the Rosanero winless at the bottom of the league after six games in the season increased pressure on Iachini, whose coaching staff was successively extended in early October with the hiring of Fabio Viviani. This was followed by the dismissal of Franco Ceravolo and his replacement with youth system head Dario Baccin.

== Club ==
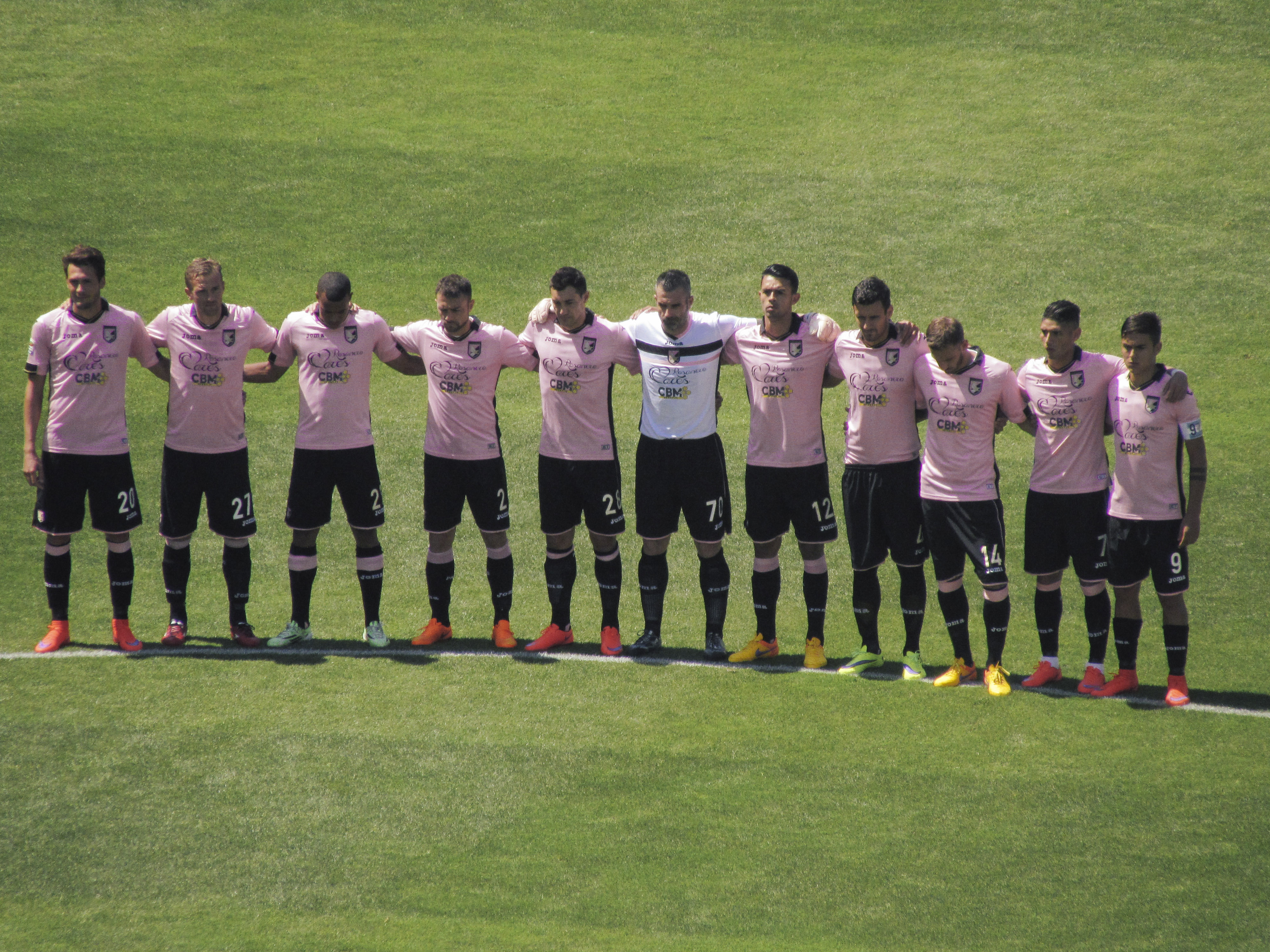
Palermo line-up for last home match of the season against Fiorentina.

=== Managerial staff ===
Position	Staff
Chairman	(Italy) Maurizio Zamparini
Vice-Chairman	(Italy) Guglielmo Miccichè
Executive Director	(Italy) Angelo Baiguera
CEO	(Italy) Andrea Cardinaletti
Sporting Manager	(Italy) Dario Baccin

Last updated: 28 January 2015
Source: U.S Città di Palermo official website

=== Coaching staff ===
Position	Staff
Head Coach	(Italy) Giuseppe Iachini
Assistant Coach	(Italy) Giuseppe Carillo
Fitness Coach	(Italy) Andrea Corrain
Fitness Coach	(Italy) Marcello Iaia
Fitness Coach	(Italy) Fabrizio Tafani
Injured Players Recovery	(Italy) Alberto Andorlini
Goalkeeping Coach	(Italy) Franco Paleari
Technical Collaborator	(Italy) Fabio Viviani

Last updated: 14 October 2014
Source: U.S. Città di Palermo official website

=== Youth system ===
Position	Staff
Youth Sport Manager	(Italy) Dario Baccin
Under-19 coach	(Italy) Giovanni Bosi
Under-19 goalkeeping coach	(Italy) Vincenzo Sicignano

Last updated: July 2014
Source: U.S Città di Palermo official website

== Players ==
=== Squad information ===
No.	Name	Nationality	Position	Date of birth (age)	Signed from	Notes
Goalkeepers
1	Samir Ujkani	(Kosovo)	GK	5 July 1988 (age 38)	Confirmed	
68	Andrea Fulignati	(Italy)	GK	31 October 1994 (age 31)	Confirmed	
70	Stefano Sorrentino	(Italy)	GK	28 March 1979 (age 47)	Confirmed	
Defenders
2	Roberto Vitiello	(Italy)	RB	8 May 1983 (age 43)	Confirmed	
3	Andrea Rispoli	(Italy)	RB	29 September 1988 (age 38)	(Italy) Parma	On loan
4	Siniša Anđelković	(Slovenia)	CB	13 February 1986 (age 40)	Confirmed	
7	Achraf Lazaar	(Morocco)	LB	22 January 1992 (age 34)	Confirmed	
12	Giancarlo González	(Costa Rica)	CB	8 February 1988 (age 38)	(United States) Columbus Crew	
13	Emerson Palmieri	(Brazil)	LB	13 March 1994 (age 32)	(Brazil) Santos	On loan
19	Claudio Terzi	(Italy)	CB	19 June 1984 (age 42)	Confirmed	
22	Danilo Ortiz	(Paraguay)	CB	28 July 1992 (age 34)	(Paraguay) Cerro Porteño	On loan
23	Zouhair Feddal	(Morocco)	CB	1 January 1989 (age 37)	(Italy) Parma	On loan
29	Roberto Vitiello	(Italy)	RB	8 May 1983 (age 43)	Confirmed	
33	Fabio Daprelà	(Switzerland)	LB	19 February 1991 (age 35)	Confirmed	
43	Davide Monteleone	(Italy)	CB	25 September 1995 (age 31)	Youth team	
89	Michel Morganella	(Switzerland)	RB	17 May 1989 (age 37)	Confirmed	
Midfielders
8	Édgar Barreto	(Paraguay)	CM	15 July 1984 (age 42)	Confirmed	
14	Francesco Della Rocca	(Italy)	CM	14 September 1987 (age 39)	(Italy) Bologna	Loan return
15	Francesco Bolzoni	(Italy)	CM	7 May 1989 (age 37)	Confirmed	
18	Ivaylo Chochev	(Bulgaria)	AM	18 February 1993 (age 33)	(Bulgaria) CSKA Sofia	
20	Franco Vázquez	(Argentina)	AM, SS	24 October 1989 (age 36)	Confirmed	
21	Robin Quaison	(Sweden)	MF	9 October 1993 (age 33)	(Sweden) AIK	
25	Enzo Maresca	(Italy)	CM	10 February 1980 (age 46)	Confirmed	
27	Luca Rigoni	(Italy)	MF	7 February 1984 (age 42)	(Italy) Chievo	
28	Mato Jajalo	(Croatia)	MF	25 May 1988 (age 38)	(Croatia) Rijka	
Forwards
9	Paulo Dybala	(Argentina)	ST	15 November 1993 (age 32)	Confirmed	
10	João Silva	(Portugal)	ST	21 May 1990 (age 36)	(Italy) Bari	
11	Simon Makienok	(Denmark)	ST	21 November 1990 (age 35)	(Denmark) Brøndby IF	
54	Antonino La Gumina	(Italy)	ST	6 March 1996 (age 30)	Youth team	
96	Accursio Bentivegna	(Italy)	AM, FW	21 June 1996 (age 30)	Youth team	
99	Andrea Belotti	(Italy)	ST	20 December 1993 (age 32)	Confirmed	

== Transfers ==
=== Summer 2014 ===
==== In ====
—	FW	ITA	Andrea Belotti (from AlbinoLeffe, first as co-ownership then fully acquired)
—	DF	MAR	Achraf Lazaar (from Varese, permanent signing from loan spell)
—	MF	BUL	Ivaylo Chochev (from CSKA Sofia)
—	MF	SWE	Robin Quaison (from AIK Fotboll)
—	MF	ITA	Luca Rigoni (from Chievo)
—	DF	MAR	Zouhair Feddal (on loan from Parma)
—	DF	BRA	Emerson Palmieri (on loan from Santos)
—	DF	CIV	Sol Bamba (free transfer)
—	DF	CRC	Giancarlo González (from Columbus Crew)
—	FW	DEN	Simon Makienok (from Brøndby IF)
—	FW	POR	João Silva (from Bari)

==== Out ====
—	FW	NIR	Kyle Lafferty (to Norwich)
—	FW	ITA	Gabriele Zerbo (to FeralpiSalò)
—	MF	ITA	Daniel Cappelletti (to Cittadella)
—	FW	ALB	Agon Mehmeti (released, to Malmö)
—	DF	CHI	Carlos Labrín (to San Marcos)
—	MF	HUN	Ádám Simon (released)
—	MF	ITA	Giulio Sanseverino (to Savoia)
—	FW	ITA	Mauro Bollino (to Foggia)
—	FW	ITA	Gianluca Di Chiara (to Catanzaro)
—	MF	POR	Nélson (released)
—	MF	SLO	Armin Bačinović (released)
—	FW	URU	Abel Hernández (to Hull)
—	FW	URU	Sebastián Sosa (to Empoli)
—	FW	ITA	Umberto Nappello (released)
—	DF	ITA	Andrea Mantovani (released)
—	DF	ITA	Salvatore Aronica (released)

==== On loan ====
—	MF	ITA	Gennaro Troianiello (to Bologna)
—	MF	ITA	Eric Lanini (to Virtus Entella)
—	FW	SUI	Cephas Malele (to Virtus Entella)
—	GK	ITA	Emiliano Viviano (to Sampdoria)
—	MF	ITA	Davide Petermann (to Südtirol)
—	MF	POR	Carlos Embalo (to Carpi)
—	DF	SLO	Aljaž Struna (to Carpi)
—	FW	SRB	Jevrem Kosnić (to Budapest Honvéd FC)
—	MF	ITA	Davide Di Gennaro (to Vicenza)
—	MF	URU	Ignacio Lores Varela (to Vicenza)

=== Winter 2014–15 ===
==== In ====
—	FW	CRO	Mato Jajalo (free transfer)
—	DF	PAR	Danilo Ortiz (on loan from Cerro Porteño)
—	DF	ITA	Andrea Rispoli (on loan from Parma)

==== Out ====
—	MF	ITA	Stefano Cerniglia (released)
—	DF	MAR	Zouhair Feddal (loan return to Parma)

==== On loan ====
—	DF	CIV	Sol Bamba (to Leeds)
—	MF	FRA	Granddi Ngoyi (to Leeds)
—	FW	SUI	Cephas Malele (loan return from Virtus Entella, to Trapani)
—	MF	ITA	Davide Petermann (loan return from Südtirol, to Torres)
—	DF	ARG	Ezequiel Muñoz (to Sampdoria)
—	DF	ITA	Eros Pisano (to Verona)
—	MF	POR	Carlos Apna Embaló (loan return from Carpi, to Lecce)
—	MF	URU	Ignacio Lores Varela (loan return from Vicenza, to Varese)

== Pre-season and friendlies ==
20 July 2014 Friendly	Alpe Adria	0–3	Palermo	Bad Kleinkirchheim
18:00 CEST (UTC+02:00)			Dybala 23'; Vázquez 24'; Belotti 88'	Stadium: Bad Kleinkirchheim Sportarena

23 July 2014 Friendly	Palermo	6–0	Jurmala	Bad Kleinkirchheim
18:00 CEST (UTC+02:00)	Vázquez 10' (pen.); Pisano 22', 30'; Belotti 56' (pen.); Embalo 76'; Daprelà 77'			Stadium: Bad Kleinkirchheim Sportarena

2 August 2014 Friendly	Apollon Limassol	0–1	Palermo	Storo
18:00 CEST (UTC+02:00)			Belotti 52' (pen.)	Stadium: Stadio Grilli; Attendance: 300

3 August 2014 Friendly	Palermo	2–2	Brescia	Storo
18:00 CEST (UTC+02:00)	Pisano 51'; Belotti 90+2'		Corvia 14'; Ntow 31'	Stadium: Stadio Grilli

8 August 2014 Friendly	Palermo	12–0	Calciochiese	Storo
18:00 CEST (UTC+02:00)	Rigoni 11'; Bolzoni 13'; Quaison 23'; Hernández 24'; Vázquez 25'; Dybala 32', 35'; Belotti 53' (pen.), 61', 75'; Chochev 71'; Daprelà 73'			Stadium: Stadio Grilli

10 August 2014 Friendly	Palermo	0–1	Al Ahli	Storo
18:00 CEST (UTC+02:00)			Jiménez 16'	Stadium: Stadio Grilli

11 August 2014 Friendly	Palermo	4–0	Al Khor	Storo
18:00 CEST (UTC+02:00)	Dybala 6', 16', 32'; Vázquez 40' (pen.)			Stadium: Stadio Grilli

4 September 2014 Friendly	Palermo	6–0	Marsala	Palermo
	João Silva (?); Quaison (?); Vázquez (?); Dybala (?); Barreto (?)			Stadium: Boccadifalco

== Competitions ==
=== Serie A ===
==== League table ====
Pos	Team	Pld	W	D	L	GF	GA	GD	Pts
9	Torino	38	14	12	12	48	45	+3	54
10	Milan	38	13	13	12	56	50	+6	52
11	Palermo	38	12	13	13	53	55	−2	49 (Note: Palermo finished ahead of Sassuolo on head-to-head away goals scored: Palermo 2-1 Sassuolo, Sassuolo 0-0 Palermo.)
12	Sassuolo	38	12	13	13	49	57	−8	49
13	Hellas Verona	38	11	13	14	49	65	−16	46

Source: 2014–15 Serie A, 2014-15 Serie A classification.
Rules for classification: 1) points; 2) head-to-head points; 3) head-to-head goal difference; 4) goal difference; 5) number of goals scored; 6) draw. (Head-to-head record is applied for clubs with the same number of points only once all matches between said clubs have been played.).

==== Results summary ====
Overall								Home						Away					
Pld	W	D	L	GF	GA	GD	Pts	W	D	L	GF	GA	GD	W	D	L	GF	GA	GD
38	12	13	13	53	55	−2	49	8	6	5	30	25	+5	4	7	8	23	30	−7

Last updated: 31 May 2015.
Source: Competitive matches

==== Results by round ====
Round	1	2	3	4	5	6	7	8	9	10	11	12	13	14	15	16	17	18	19	20	21	22	23	24	25	26	27	28	29	30	31	32	33	34	35	36	37	38
Ground	H	A	H	A	H	A	H	A	H	A	H	A	H	A	H	A	H	A	H	A	H	A	H	A	H	A	H	A	H	A	H	A	H	A	H	A	H	A
Result	D	L	D	D	L	L	W	L	W	W	D	D	W	D	W	D	W	L	D	D	W	L	W	L	D	D	L	L	L	W	W	L	D	D	L	W	L	W
Position	9	14	16	14	19	19	16	18	15	13	12	13	11	11	10	10	8	10	10	8	7	9	8	11	11	11	11	11	11	11	11	11	11	10	11	10	11	11

Updated to match(es) played on 31 May 2015. Source: Competitive matches
A = Away; H = Home; W = Win; D = Draw; L = Loss

==== Matches ====
31 August 2014 1	Palermo	1–1	Sampdoria	Palermo
20:45 CEST (UTC+02:00)	Dybala 7'; Rigoni (yellow card) 26'	Report	De Silvestri (yellow card) 30'; Regini (yellow card) 33' (yellow-red card) 41'; Okaka (yellow card) 82'; Gastaldello 90+1'	Stadium: Stadio Renzo Barbera; Attendance: 17,064; Referee: Dino Tommasi

15 September 2014 2	Hellas Verona	2–1	Palermo	Verona
20:45 CEST (UTC+02:00)	Toni 41' (pen.); Agostini (yellow card) 43'; Hallfreðsson (yellow card) 73'; Márquez (yellow card) 73'; Pisano 78' (o.g.); Obbadi (yellow card) 90+2'	Report	Vázquez 18'; Daprelà (yellow card) 24'; Feddal (yellow card) 32'	Stadium: Stadio Marc'Antonio Bentegodi; Attendance: 18,304; Referee: Gianluca Rocchi

21 September 2014 3	Palermo	1–1	Internazionale	Palermo
20:45 CEST (UTC+02:00)	Vázquez 3'; Rigoni (yellow card) 44'; Morganella (yellow card) 48'	Report	Juan (yellow card) 33'; Medel (yellow card) 36'; Kovačić 42'; Ranocchia (yellow card) 80'; Dodô (yellow card) 90+1'	Stadium: Stadio Renzo Barbera; Attendance: 18,292; Referee: Paolo Valeri

24 September 2014 4	Napoli	3–3	Palermo	Naples
20:45 CEST (UTC+02:00)	Koulibaly 2', (yellow card) 31'; Zapata 11'; Callejón 45+1'	Report	Belotti 18', 61'; Vázquez 24'; Morganella (yellow card) 33'; João Silva (yellow card) 66'; Bamba (yellow card) 73'; Terzi (yellow card) 90+6'	Stadium: Stadio San Paolo; Attendance: 18,521; Referee: Daniele Doveri

29 September 2014 5	Palermo	0–4	Lazio	Palermo
21:00 CEST (UTC+02:00)	Morganella (yellow card) 42'; Vázquez (yellow card) 90+2'	Report	Parolo (yellow card) 20', (goal) 90+2'; Đorđević 45', 75', 83'; Mauri (yellow card) 64'; Cana (yellow card) 65'; Marchetti (yellow card) 79'	Stadium: Stadio Renzo Barbera; Attendance: 17,087; Referee: Marco Di Bello

5 October 2014 6	Empoli	3–0	Palermo	Empoli
12:30 CEST (UTC+02:00)	Maccarone 4'; Tonelli 33'; Pucciarelli 63'	Report	Vázquez (yellow card) 11'; Feddal (yellow card) 16'; Bolzoni (yellow card) 37'; Terzi (yellow card) 70'	Stadium: Stadio Carlo Castellani; Attendance: 7,504; Referee: Nicola Rizzoli

19 October 2014 7	Palermo	2–1	Cesena	Palermo
15:00 CEST (UTC+02:00)	Dybala 33'; Chochev (yellow card) 35'; Anđelković (yellow card) 60'; Vázquez (yellow card) 65'; Muñoz (yellow card) 81'; Rigoni (yellow card) 88'; González 90+1'	Report	Perico (yellow card) 9'; Rodríguez 61' (pen.); De Feudis (yellow card) 72'; Coppola (yellow card) 76' (yellow-red card) 79'; Capelli (yellow card) 90+5'	Stadium: Stadio Renzo Barbera; Attendance: 14,780; Referee: Antonio Damato

26 October 2014 8	Juventus	2–0	Palermo	Turin
15:00 CET (UTC+01:00)	Vidal 32', (yellow card) 79'; Marchisio (yellow card) 60'; Llorente 64'	Report	Barreto (yellow card) 50'	Stadium: Juventus Stadium; Attendance: 38,891; Referee: Gianpaolo Calvarese

29 October 2014 9	Palermo	1–0	Chievo	Palermo
20:45 CET (UTC+01:00)	Dybala (yellow card) 55'; Rigoni (yellow card) 62', (goal) 81'	Report	Sardo (yellow card) 53'	Stadium: Stadio Renzo Barbera; Attendance: 13,985; Referee: Sebastiano Peruzzo

2 November 2014 10	Milan	0–2	Palermo	Milan
20:45 CET (UTC+01:00)	De Jong (yellow card) 17'; El Shaarawy (yellow card) 51'; Rami (yellow card) 88'	Report	González (yellow card) 16'; Morganella (yellow card) 19'; Zapata 23' (o.g.); Dybala 26'; Anđelković (yellow card) 45+1'	Stadium: San Siro; Attendance: 28,272; Referee: Andrea Gervasoni

9 November 2014 11	Palermo	1–1	Udinese	Palermo
15:00 CET (UTC+01:00)	Sorrentino (yellow card) 42'; Dybala 42' (pen.)	Report	Théréau 5'; Badu (yellow card) 16'; Allan (yellow card) 53'; Piris (yellow card) 82'; Pinzi (yellow card) 87'; Kone (yellow card) 90+3'	Stadium: Stadio Renzo Barbera; Attendance: 15,658; Referee: Daniele Doveri

24 November 2014 12	Genoa	1–1	Palermo	Genoa
20:45 CET (UTC+01:00)	Antonelli 30'; Roncaglia (yellow card) 33'; Greco (yellow card) 56'	Report	Dybala 7'	Stadium: Stadio Luigi Ferraris; Attendance: 18,588; Referee: Michael Fabbri

30 November 2014 13	Palermo	2–1	Parma	Palermo
15:00 CET (UTC+01:00)	Dybala 37'; Barreto (yellow card) 65' (yellow-red card) 90', (goal) 73'; Vázquez (yellow card) 85'	Report	Palladino 40'; Costa (yellow card) 63'; Felipe (yellow card) 77' (yellow-red card) 80'	Stadium: Stadio Renzo Barbera; Attendance: 14,444; Referee: Massimiliano Irrati

6 December 2014 14	Torino	2–2	Palermo	Turin
20:45 CET (UTC+01:00)	Peres (yellow card) 30'; Martínez 35'; Glik 63'	Report	Rigoni 16', (yellow card) 84'; Lazaar (yellow card) 30'; Dybala 43'; Chochev (yellow card) 45+2'	Stadium: Stadio Olimpico di Torino; Attendance: 13,974; Referee: Piero Giacomelli

13 December 2014 15	Palermo	2–1	Sassuolo	Palermo
18:00 CET (UTC+01:00)	Rigoni 3'; Belotti 90+3', (yellow card) 90+4'	Report	Gazzola (yellow card) 53'; Consigli (red card) 66'; Magnanelli (yellow card) 78'; Pavoletti 85'; Zaza (yellow card) 87'; Cannavaro (red card) 90+6'	Stadium: Stadio Renzo Barbera; Attendance: 21,086; Referee: Fabio Maresca

21 December 2014 16	Atalanta	3–3	Palermo	Bergamo
15:00 CET (UTC+01:00)	Benalouane (yellow card) 20'; Baselli (yellow card) 25'; Denis 40' (pen.), 76'; Moralez 55'; Carmona (yellow card) 64'; Bianchi (yellow card) 79'; Cigarini (yellow card) 84'	Report	Rigoni 6'; Vázquez 16', 45+1'; González (yellow card) 33'; Della Rocca (yellow card) 90+2'	Stadium: Stadio Atleti Azzurri d'Italia; Attendance: 12,344; Referee: Daniele Orsato

6 January 2015 17	Palermo	5–0	Cagliari	Palermo
15:00 CET (UTC+01:00)	Morganella 6'; Muñoz 10', (yellow card) 61'; Maresca (yellow card) 22'; Dybala 33' (pen.), 72'; Vázquez (yellow card) 41'; Barreto 85'	Report	Conti (yellow card) 18' (yellow-red card) 26'; Colombi (yellow card) 32'; Crisetig (yellow card) 38'; Farias (yellow card) 56'	Stadium: Stadio Renzo Barbera; Attendance: 18,268; Referee: Sebastiano Peruzzo

11 January 2015 18	Fiorentina	4–3	Palermo	Florence
15:00 CET (UTC+01:00)	Pasqual 20'; Tomović (yellow card) 42'; Basanta 51', (yellow card) 81'; Valero (yellow card) 64'; Cuadrado 64'; Joaquín 74', (yellow card) 75'	Report	Rigoni (yellow card) 40'; Quaison 59', 61'; Morganella (yellow card) 66'; Belotti 81' (pen.)	Stadium: Stadio Artemio Franchi; Attendance: 27,400; Referee: Paolo Mazzoleni

18 January 2015 19	Palermo	1–1	Roma	Palermo
20:45 CET (UTC+01:00)	Dybala 2'; Morganella (yellow card) 45+1'; Lazaar (yellow card) 63'	Report	Destro 54', (yellow card) 90'; Yanga-Mbiwa (yellow card) 12'; Strootman (yellow card) 89'	Stadium: Stadio Renzo Barbera; Attendance: 15,397; Referee: Antonio Damato

25 January 2015 20	Sampdoria	1–1	Palermo	Genoa
15:00 CET (UTC+01:00)	Éder 6'; Obiang (yellow card) 60'; Soriano (yellow card) 73'; De Silvestri (yellow card) 76'	Report	González (yellow card) 21'; Vázquez 49'; Bolzoni (yellow card) 61'; Anđelković (yellow card) 67'	Stadium: Stadio Luigi Ferraris; Attendance: 22,023; Referee: Angelo Cervellera

1 February 2015 21	Palermo	2–1	Hellas Verona	Palermo
15:00 CET (UTC+01:00)	Dybala 18'; Belotti 79'; Anđelković (yellow card) 83'	Report	Tachtsidis 8'; Marques (yellow card) 19'; Saviola (yellow card) 90+1'	Stadium: Stadio Renzo Barbera; Attendance: 14,058; Referee: Dino Tommasi

8 February 2015 22	Internazionale	3–0	Palermo	Milan
20:45 CET (UTC+01:00)	Medel (yellow card) 13'; Guarín 16'; Juan (yellow card) 40'; Icardi 65', 88'	Report	Morganella (yellow card) 20'; Rigoni (yellow card) 72'; González (yellow card) 77'	Stadium: San Siro; Attendance: 30,085; Referee: Marco Guida

14 February 2015 23	Palermo	3–1	Napoli	Palermo
20:45 CET (UTC+01:00)	Lazaar 14'; Vázquez 36'; Rispoli (yellow card) 53'; Rigoni (yellow card) 59', (goal) 65'; Bolzoni (yellow card) 82'	Report	Jorginho (yellow card) 7'; Higuaín (yellow card) 41'; Gabbiadini 82'	Stadium: Stadio Renzo Barbera; Attendance: 12,784; Referee: Paolo Mazzoleni

22 February 2015 24	Lazio	2–1	Palermo	Rome
15:00 CET (UTC+01:00)	Mauri 33'; Parolo (yellow card) 36'; Radu (yellow card) 61'; Maurício (yellow card) 63'; Candreva 78'	Report	Quaison (yellow card) 23'; Dybala 26'; Jajalo (yellow card) 59'; Barreto (yellow card) 90+2' (yellow-red card) 90+4'; Rispoli (yellow card) 90+4'	Stadium: Stadio Olimpico; Attendance: 27,186; Referee: Marco Di Bello

1 March 2015 25	Palermo	0–0	Empoli	Palermo
15:00 CET (UTC+01:00)	Rispoli (yellow card) 37'; Dybala (yellow card) 51'; Daprelà (yellow card) 69'	Report	Hysaj (yellow card) 5'; Vecino (yellow card) 18'; Zieliński (yellow card) 89'	Stadium: Stadio Renzo Barbera; Attendance: 22,352; Referee: Angelo Cervellera

8 March 2015 26	Cesena	0–0	Palermo	Cesena
12:30 CET (UTC+01:00)	Giorgi (yellow card) 15'	Report	Jajalo (yellow card) 10'; Barreto (yellow card) 18'	Stadium: Stadio Dino Manuzzi; Attendance: 15,071; Referee: Luca Banti

14 March 2015 27	Palermo	0–1	Juventus	Palermo
18:00 CET (UTC+01:00)	Vázquez (yellow card) 39'; Anđelković (yellow card) 41'; Dybala (yellow card) 87'	Report	Barzagli (yellow card) 52'; Morata 70', (yellow card) 80'; Lichtsteiner (yellow card) 84'; Pereyra (yellow card) 90'	Stadium: Stadio Renzo Barbera; Attendance: 29,850; Referee: Marco Guida

21 March 2015 28	Chievo	1–0	Palermo	Verona
18:00 CET (UTC+01:00)	Paloschi 35'; Izco (yellow card) 42'	Report	Maresca (yellow card) 29'; Anđelković (yellow card) 61' (yellow-red card) 86'	Stadium: Stadio Marc'Antonio Bentegodi; Attendance: 9,128; Referee: Piero Giacomelli

4 April 2015 29	Palermo	1–2	Milan	Palermo
15:00 CEST (UTC+02:00)	Vitiello (yellow card) 67'; Dybala 72' (pen.); Jajalo (yellow card) 73'	Report	Cerci 37'; Abate (yellow card) 62'; Paletta (yellow card) 71'; Ménez 83'; Mexès (yellow card) 90+2'	Stadium: Stadio Renzo Barbera; Attendance: 15,113; Referee: Daniele Doveri

12 April 2015 30	Udinese	1–3	Palermo	Udine
15:00 CEST (UTC+02:00)	Danilo (yellow card) 72'; Guilherme (yellow card) 74'; Di Natale 81'	Report	Lazaar 15'; Rigoni 21'; Chochev 66'	Stadium: Stadio Friuli; Attendance: 8,704; Referee: Dino Tommasi

19 April 2015 31	Palermo	2–1	Genoa	Palermo
15:00 CEST (UTC+02:00)	Chochev 9', 30'; Vitiello (yellow card) 36'; Jajalo (yellow card) 55'; Vázquez (yellow card) 66'; Belotti (yellow card) 83'	Report	Falque 52'; Rincón (yellow card) 71'; De Maio (yellow card) 78'; Pavoletti (yellow card) 90'	Stadium: Stadio Renzo Barbera; Attendance: 15,471; Referee: Angelo Cervellera

26 April 2015 32	Parma	1–0	Palermo	Parma
15:00 CEST (UTC+02:00)	Nocerino 22' (pen.); Costa (yellow card) 27'; Feddal (yellow card) 57'; Gobbi (yellow card) 76'; Lila (yellow card) 83'	Report		Stadium: Stadio Ennio Tardini; Attendance: 10,921; Referee: Marco Di Bello

29 April 2015 33	Palermo	2–2	Torino	Palermo
20:45 CEST (UTC+02:00)	Vitiello 10'; Rigoni 26'; Chochev (yellow card) 49'; Rispoli (yellow card) 55'	Report	Peres 13'; Maxi López 60', (yellow card) 90'; Vives (yellow card) 74'; Silva (yellow card) 76'	Stadium: Stadio Renzo Barbera; Attendance: 15,238; Referee: Andrea Gervasoni

2 May 2015 34	Sassuolo	0–0	Palermo	Reggio Emilia
20:45 CEST (UTC+02:00)	Lazarević (yellow card) 54'; Brighi (yellow card) 90+3'	Report	Terzi (yellow card) 28'; Vitiello (yellow card) 35'; Rigoni (yellow card) 52'	Stadium: Mapei Stadium – Città del Tricolore; Attendance: 11,321; Referee: Ivano Pezzuto

10 May 2015 35	Palermo	2–3	Atalanta	Palermo
15:00 CEST (UTC+02:00)	González (yellow card) 20'; Vázquez 43'; Rigoni 68'	Report	Baselli 6'; Anđelković 17' (o.g.); Zappacosta (yellow card) 24'; Biava (yellow card) 36'; Gómez 51'; Avramov (red card) 56'	Stadium: Stadio Renzo Barbera; Attendance: 13,792; Referee: Gianpaolo Calvarese

17 May 2015 36	Cagliari	0–1	Palermo	Cagliari
15:00 CEST (UTC+02:00)	Balzano (yellow card) 55'; Ekdal (yellow card) 80'; Diakité (yellow card) 81'	Report	Rigoni (yellow card) 6'; Vázquez 9'; Chochev (yellow card) 12'; González (yellow card) 81'	Stadium: Stadio Sant'Elia; Attendance: 6,000; Referee: Angelo Cervellera

24 May 2015 37	Palermo	2–3	Fiorentina	Palermo
15:00 CEST (UTC+02:00)	Jajalo 26'; Rigoni (yellow card) 38', (goal) 69'; Quaison (yellow card) 90+5'	Report	Iličić 23'; Gilardino 33'; Gonzalo (yellow card) 39'; Pasqual (yellow card) 65'; Alonso 78'; Kurtić (yellow card) 90' (yellow-red card) 90+3'; Neto (yellow card) 90+5'	Stadium: Stadio Renzo Barbera; Attendance: 27,429; Referee: Piero Giacomelli

31 May 2015 38	Roma	1–2	Palermo	Rome
20:45 CEST (UTC+02:00)	Astori (yellow card) 56'; Totti 85'; Iturbe (yellow card) 90'	Report	Vázquez 35' (pen.); Jajalo (yellow card) 68'; Terzi (yellow card) 76'; Belotti (yellow card) 77', (goal) 90+4'	Stadium: Stadio Olimpico; Attendance: 44,752; Referee: Luigi Nasca

=== Coppa Italia ===
24 August 2014 Third round	Palermo	0–3	Modena	Palermo
			Ferrari 6'; Beltrame 42'; Schiavone 88'	Stadium: Stadio Renzo Barbera; Attendance: 15,490; Referee: Marco Guida

== Statistics ==
=== Appearances and goals ===
As of 30 May 2015.

No.	Pos	Nat	Player	Total		Serie A		Coppa Italia	
No.	Pos	Nat	Player	Apps	Goals	Apps	Goals	Apps	Goals
Goalkeepers
1	GK	(Kosovo) KOS	Samir Ujkani	4	0	3	0	1	0
68	GK	(Italy) ITA	Andrea Fulignati	0	0	0	0	0	0
70	GK	(Italy) ITA	Stefano Sorrentino	35	0	35	0	0	0
Defenders
2	DF	(Italy) ITA	Roberto Vitiello	19	1	17+2	1	0	0
3	DF	(Italy) ITA	Andrea Rispoli	15	0	9+6	0	0	0
4	DF	(Slovenia) SLO	Siniša Anđelković	32	0	32	0	0	0
5	DF	(Serbia) SRB	Milan Milanović	1	0	0	0	1	0
7	DF	(Morocco) MAR	Achraf Lazaar	30	2	27+2	2	1	0
12	DF	(Costa Rica) CRC	Giancarlo González	28	1	28	1	0	0
13	DF	(Brazil) BRA	Emerson Palmieri	9	0	0+9	0	0	0
19	DF	(Italy) ITA	Claudio Terzi	15	0	14+1	0	0	0
22	DF	(Paraguay) PAR	Danilo Ortiz	0	0	0	0	0	0
33	DF	(Switzerland) SUI	Fabio Daprelà	22	0	11+11	0	0	0
43	DF	(Italy) ITA	Davide Monteleone	0	0	0	0	0	0
89	DF	(Switzerland) SUI	Michel Morganella	20	1	20	1	0	0
Midfielders
8	MF	(Paraguay) PAR	Édgar Barreto (c)	25	2	24	2	1	0
14	MF	(Italy) ITA	Francesco Della Rocca	5	0	1+4	0	0	0
15	MF	(Italy) ITA	Francesco Bolzoni	24	0	12+11	0	1	0
18	MF	(Bulgaria) BUL	Ivaylo Chochev	18	3	13+5	3	0	0
20	MF	(Argentina) ARG	Franco Vázquez	38	10	37	10	1	0
21	MF	(Sweden) SWE	Robin Quaison	20	2	8+11	2	1	0
25	MF	(Italy) ITA	Enzo Maresca	20	0	14+5	0	1	0
27	MF	(Italy) ITA	Luca Rigoni	32	9	31	9	1	0
28	MF	(Croatia) CRO	Mato Jajalo	16	1	14+2	1	0	0
Forwards
9	FW	(Argentina) ARG	Paulo Dybala	35	13	34	13	1	0
10	FW	(Portugal) POR	João Silva	1	0	0+1	0	0	0
11	FW	(Denmark) DEN	Simon Makienok	4	0	0+4	0	0	0
54	FW	(Italy) ITA	Antonino La Gumina	1	0	0+1	0	0	0
96	FW	(Italy) ITA	Accursio Bentivegna	3	0	0+3	0	0	0
99	FW	(Italy) ITA	Andrea Belotti	39	6	9+29	6	1	0
Players transferred out during the season
3	DF	(Italy) ITA	Eros Pisano	5	0	4	0	1	0
6	DF	(Argentina) ARG	Ezequiel Muñoz	14	1	13	1	1	0
17	MF	(France) FRA	Granddi Ngoyi	5	0	0+5	0	0	0
22	DF	(Ivory Coast) CIV	Sol Bamba	1	0	1	0	0	0
23	DF	(Morocco) MAR	Zouhair Feddal	8	0	7	0	1	0

=== Goalscorers ===
This includes all competitive matches. The list is sorted by shirt number when total goals are equal.

R	No.	Pos	Nat	Name	Serie A	Coppa Italia	Total
1	9	FW	(Argentina)	Paulo Dybala	13	0	13
2	20	MF	(Argentina)	Franco Vázquez	10	0	10
=	27	MF	(Italy)	Luca Rigoni	9	0	9
4	99	FW	(Italy)	Andrea Belotti	6	0	6
5	18	MF	(Bulgaria)	Ivaylo Chochev	3	0	3
6	8	MF	(Paraguay)	Édgar Barreto	2	0	2
=	21	MF	(Sweden)	Robin Quaison	2	0	2
=	7	DF	(Morocco)	Achraf Lazaar	2	0	2
7	89	DF	(Switzerland)	Michel Morganella	1	0	1
=	6	DF	(Argentina)	Ezequiel Muñoz	1	0	1
=	12	MF	(Costa Rica)	Giancarlo González	1	0	1

Last updated: 30 May 2015
Source: Competitions
