= 2015–16 US Città di Palermo season =

Palermo
2015–16 season
- Chairman: Maurizio Zamparini
- Manager: Giuseppe Iachini (until 10 November 2015); Davide Ballardini (from 10 November 2015 to 11 January 2016); Fabio Viviani (caretaker) (from 11 January 2016 to 26 January 2016); Giovanni Tedesco (from 26 January 2016 to 10 February 2016); Giovanni Bosi (from 10 February 2016 to 15 February 2016); Giuseppe Iachini (from 15 February 2016 to 10 March 2016); Walter Novellino (from 10 March 2016 to 11 April 2016); Davide Ballardini (from 12 April 2016)
- Stadium: Stadio Renzo Barbera
- Serie A: 16th
- Coppa Italia: Fourth round
- Top goalscorer: League: Alberto Gilardino (10); All: Alberto Gilardino (11)
- Highest home attendance: 33,345 vs Hellas Verona (15 May 2016, Serie A)
- Lowest home attendance: 0 (behind closed doors) vs Atalanta (20 April 2016, Serie A)
- Average home league attendance: 18,023
Home colours	Away colours	Third colours

U.S. Città di Palermo played the season 2015–16 in the Serie A league and Coppa Italia.

== Players ==
=== Squad information ===
No.	Name	Nationality	Position	Date of birth (age)	Signed from	Notes
Goalkeepers
70	Stefano Sorrentino	(Italy)	GK	28 March 1979 (age 47)	Confirmed	Captain
91	Simone Colombi	(Italy)	GK	1 July 1991 (age 35)	(Italy) Cagliari	
Defenders
2	Roberto Vitiello	(Italy)	RB	8 May 1983 (age 43)	Confirmed	
3	Andrea Rispoli	(Italy)	RB	29 September 1988 (age 37)	(Italy) Parma	Confirmed
4	Siniša Anđelković	(Slovenia)	CB	13 February 1986 (age 40)	Confirmed	
6	Edoardo Goldaniga	(Italy)	CB	2 November 1993 (age 32)	Loan Return	
7	Achraf Lazaar	(Morocco)	LB	22 January 1992 (age 34)	Confirmed	
12	Giancarlo González	(Costa Rica)	CB	8 February 1988 (age 38)	(United States) Columbus Crew	
13	Emerson Palmieri	(Brazil)	LB	13 March 1994 (age 32)	(Brazil) Santos	On loan
23	Aljaž Struna	(Slovenia)	CB	4 August 1990 (age 36)	Confirmed	
33	Fabio Daprelà	(Switzerland)	LB	19 February 1991 (age 35)	Confirmed	
34	Abdelhamid El Kaoutari	(Morocco)	CB	17 March 1990 (age 36)	(France) Montpellier	
77	Michel Morganella	(Switzerland)	RB	17 May 1989 (age 37)	Confirmed	
Midfielders
5	Francesco Bolzoni	(Italy)	CM	7 May 1989 (age 37)	Confirmed	
10	Oscar Hiljemark	(Sweden)	CM	28 June 1992 (age 34)	(Netherlands) PSV	
16	Gastón Brugman	(Uruguay)	CM	7 November 1992 (age 33)	(Italy) Pescara	
17	Ahmad Benali	(Libya)	CM	7 February 1992 (age 34)	(Italy) Brescia	
18	Ivaylo Chochev	(Bulgaria)	AM	18 February 1993 (age 33)	(Bulgaria) CSKA Sofia	
20	Franco Vázquez	(Argentina)	AM, SS	24 October 1989 (age 36)	Confirmed	
21	Robin Quaison	(Sweden)	MF	9 October 1993 (age 32)	(Sweden) AIK	
25	Enzo Maresca	(Italy)	CM	10 February 1980 (age 46)	Confirmed	
27	Luca Rigoni	(Italy)	MF	7 February 1984 (age 42)	(Italy) Chievo	
28	Mato Jajalo	(Croatia)	MF	25 May 1988 (age 38)	(Croatia) Rijeka	
Forwards
8	Aleksandar Trajkovski	(North Macedonia)	CM	5 November 1992 (age 33)	(Belgium) Zulte Waregem	
9	Matheus Cassini	(Brazil)	ST	15 November 1995 (age 30)	Confirmed	
11	Alberto Gilardino	(Italy)	ST	5 July 1982 (age 44)	(China) Guangzhou Evergrande	
26	Accursio Bentivegna	(Italy)	AM, FW	21 June 1996 (age 30)	Youth team	
54	Antonio la Gumina	(Italy)	ST	6 March 1996 (age 30)	Youth team	
99	Uroš Đurđević	(Serbia)	ST	2 March 1994 (age 32)	(Netherlands) Vitesse Arnhem	

== Transfers ==
=== In ===
Date	Pos.	Player	Age	Moving from	Fee	Notes	Source
27 August 2015	FW	(Italy) Alberto Gilardino	33	(China) Guangzhou Evergrande			

=== Out ===
Date	Pos.	Player	Age	Moving from	Fee	Notes	Source
18 August 2015	FW	(Italy) Andrea Belotti	21	(Italy) Torino			

== Competitions ==
=== Serie A ===
==== League table ====
Pos	Team	Pld	W	D	L	GF	GA	GD	Pts	Qualification or relegation
14	Bologna	38	11	9	18	33	45	−12	42	
15	Sampdoria	38	10	10	18	48	61	−13	40	
16	Palermo	38	10	9	19	38	65	−27	39 (Note: Palermo ahead of Udinese on head-to-head points; Palermo 6 points, Udinese 0 points.)	
17	Udinese	38	10	9	19	35	60	−25	39	
18	Carpi (R)	38	9	11	18	37	57	−20	38	Relegation to Serie B

Source: Serie A, Soccerway
Rules for classification: 1) Points; 2) Head-to-head points; 3) Head-to-head goal difference; 4) Goal difference; 5) Goals scored; 6) Draw.
(R) Relegated

==== Results summary ====
Overall								Home						Away					
Pld	W	D	L	GF	GA	GD	Pts	W	D	L	GF	GA	GD	W	D	L	GF	GA	GD
38	9	9	20	37	66	−29	36	6	4	10	24	34	−10	3	5	10	13	32	−19

Last updated: 15 May 2016.
Source: Competitive matches

==== Results by round ====
Round	1	2	3	4	5	6	7	8	9	10	11	12	13	14	15	16	17	18	19	20	21	22	23	24	25	26	27	28	29	30	31	32	33	34	35	36	37	38
Ground	H	A	H	A	H	A	H	A	H	A	H	H	A	H	A	H	A	H	A	A	H	A	H	A	H	A	H	A	H	A	A	H	A	H	A	H	A	H
Result	W	W	D	L	L	L	L	W	D	L	L	W	D	L	L	W	L	L	W	L	W	D	L	D	L	L	D	L	L	D	L	L	L	D	W	W	D	W
Position	8	5	7	8	11	12	13	11	13	13	16	12	14	16	17	14	16	16	16	17	14	14	15	15	15	16	17	17	17	18	18	18	19	19	18	18	17	16

Updated to match(es) played on 9 May 2016. Source: Competitive matches
A = Away; H = Home; W = Win; D = Draw; L = Loss

==== Matches ====
23 August 2015 1	Palermo	1–0	Genoa	Palermo
20:45 CEST (UTC+02:00)	Vitiello (yellow card) 28'; El Kaoutari 90+1'	Report	Marchese (yellow card) 90'	Stadium: Stadio Renzo Barbera; Attendance: 22,608; Referee: Massimiliano Irrati

30 August 2015 2	Udinese	0–1	Palermo	Udine
20:45 CEST (UTC+02:00)	Zapata (yellow card) 44'; Merkel (yellow card) 56'; Iturra (yellow card) 78'; Fernandes (yellow card) 81'	Report	Rigoni 8'; Struna (yellow card) 44' (yellow-red card) 70'; Sorrentino (yellow card) 50'; Jajalo (yellow card) 82'	Stadium: Stadio Friuli; Attendance: 13,200; Referee: Antonio Damato

13 September 2015 3	Palermo	2–2	Carpi	Palermo
15:00 CEST (UTC+02:00)	Hiljemark 6'; El Kaoutari (yellow card) 40'; González (yellow card) 66'; Đurđević 88'; Vitiello (yellow card) 89'	Report	Gagliolo (yellow card) 9'; Bianco (yellow card) 16'; Vitiello 24' (o.g.); Borriello 64'; Gabriel Silva (yellow card) 90+4'	Stadium: Stadio Renzo Barbera; Attendance: 20,250; Referee: Claudio Gavillucci

19 September 2015 4	Milan	3–2	Palermo	Milan
20:45 CEST (UTC+02:00)	Bacca 21', 75'; Bonaventura 40'; Montolivo (yellow card) 80'	Report	Hiljemark 32', 72'; Lazaar (yellow card) 45+3'; González (yellow card) 66'	Stadium: San Siro; Attendance: 33,689; Referee: Carmine Russo

23 September 2015 5	Palermo	0–1	Sassuolo	Palermo
20:45 CEST (UTC+02:00)	Rigoni (yellow card) 43' (yellow-red card) 85'	Report	Missiroli (yellow card) 31'; Floccari 35'; Vrsaljko (yellow card) 61'; Acerbi (yellow card) 68'; Cannavaro (yellow card) 72'; Biondini (yellow card) 77'; Magnanelli (yellow card) 83'	Stadium: Stadio Renzo Barbera; Attendance: 17,730; Referee: Luca Pairetto

27 September 2015 6	Torino	2–1	Palermo	Turin
15:00 CEST (UTC+02:00)	Bovo (yellow card) 34'; Molinaro (yellow card) 37' (yellow-red card) 61'; González 44' (o.g.); Benassi 48'; Padelli (yellow card) 77'; Obi (red card) 90'	Report	Rispoli (yellow card) 31'; Vázquez (yellow card) 42'; Struna (yellow card) 66'; González 71'; Quaison (yellow card) 88'; El Kaoutari (yellow card) 90'	Stadium: Stadio Olimpico di Torino; Attendance: 17,640; Referee: Maurizio Mariani

4 October 2015 7	Palermo	2–4	Roma	Palermo
15:00 CEST (UTC+02:00)	Hiljemark (yellow card) 48'; Gilardino 58', (yellow card) 65'; Chochev (yellow card) 61'; Struna (yellow card) 64'; González 90+1'	Report	Pjanić 2'; Florenzi 14'; Gervinho 28', 90+2'; Nainggolan (yellow card) 34'; Emerson (yellow card) 76'; Manolas (yellow card) 81'	Stadium: Stadio Renzo Barbera; Attendance: 15,910; Referee: Antonio Damato

18 October 2015 8	Bologna	0–1	Palermo	Bologna
12:30 CEST (UTC+02:00)	Rizzo (yellow card) 74'	Report	Vázquez 24', (yellow card) 24'; Hiljemark (yellow card) 46'; Struna (yellow card) 66'; Rispoli (yellow card) 81'	Stadium: Stadio Renato Dall'Ara; Attendance: 16,010; Referee: Michael Fabbri

24 October 2015 9	Palermo	1–1	Internazionale	Palermo
20:45 CET (UTC+01:00)	Vázquez (yellow card) 38'; Maresca (yellow card) 49'; Gilardino 66', (yellow card) 85'	Report	Murillo (yellow card) 27' (yellow-red card) 79'; Kondogbia (yellow card) 31'; Perišić 60'	Stadium: Stadio Renzo Barbera; Attendance: 20,626; Referee: Daniele Doveri

28 October 2015 10	Napoli	2–0	Palermo	Naples
20:45 CET (UTC+01:00)	Higuaín 39'; Mertens 80'	Report		Stadium: Stadio San Paolo; Attendance: 27,580; Referee: Piero Giacomelli

2 November 2015 11	Palermo	0–1	Empoli	Palermo
21:00 CET (UTC+01:00)	Brugman (yellow card) 27'; Lazaar (yellow card) 34'; Struna (yellow card) 43'; Anđelković (yellow card) 51'; Rispoli (yellow card) 54'; Quaison (yellow card) 59'	Report	Saponara (yellow card) 34', (goal) 53'; Mário Rui (yellow card) 74'; Maiello (yellow card) 88'	Stadium: Stadio Renzo Barbera; Attendance: 16,731; Referee: Marco Di Bello

8 November 2015 12	Palermo	1–0	Chievo	Palermo
15:00 CET (UTC+01:00)	Daprelà (yellow card) 42'; Gilardino 71', (yellow card) 71'; Vázquez (yellow card) 84'; Goldaniga (yellow card) 90+3'	Report	Radovanović (yellow card) 25'; Cesar (yellow card) 37'; Gobbi (yellow card) 63'	Stadium: Stadio Renzo Barbera; Attendance: 14,176; Referee: Maurizio Mariani

22 November 2015 13	Lazio	1–1	Palermo	Rome
15:00 CET (UTC+01:00)	Gentiletti (yellow card) 60'; Matri (yellow card) 62'; Candreva 70' (pen.); Biglia (yellow card) 90+3'	Report	Goldaniga 21'; Chochev (yellow card) 58'; Hiljemark (yellow card) 69'; Trajkovski (yellow card) 78'	Stadium: Stadio Olimpico; Attendance: 17,175; Referee: Domenico Celi

29 November 2015 14	Palermo	0–3	Juventus	Palermo
20:45 CET (UTC+01:00)	Struna (yellow card) 50'; Vázquez (yellow card) 76'	Report	Pogba (yellow card) 25'; Mandžukić 54'; Barzagli (yellow card) 61'; Sturaro (yellow card) 76', (goal) 89'; Zaza 90+3'	Stadium: Stadio Renzo Barbera; Attendance: 25,737; Referee: Paolo Valeri

6 December 2015 15	Atalanta	3–0	Palermo	Bergamo
15:00 CET (UTC+01:00)	Denis 18'; Cherubin 26'; Kurtić (yellow card) 42'; Migliaccio (red card) 76'; De Roon 80'	Report	Anđelković (yellow card) 50'; Jajalo (yellow card) 65'; González (yellow card) 68'	Stadium: Stadio Atleti Azzurri d'Italia; Attendance: 14,499; Referee: Carmine Russo

12 December 2015 16	Palermo	4–1	Frosinone	Palermo
18:00 CET (UTC+01:00)	Goldaniga 5'; Vázquez 17'; Đurđević (yellow card) 39'; Trajkovski 60'; Gilardino 86'; González (yellow card) 88'	Report	Sammarco 24'; Pavlović (yellow card) 34'; Blanchard (yellow card) 39'; Gori (yellow card) 42'	Stadium: Stadio Renzo Barbera; Attendance: 14,402; Referee: Daniele Doveri

20 December 2015 17	Sampdoria	2–0	Palermo	Genoa
18:00 CET (UTC+01:00)	Soriano 53'; Fernando (yellow card) 63'; Ivan (yellow card) 65', (goal) 76'	Report	Vázquez (yellow card) 43'; Struna (yellow card) 57'; González (yellow card) 90'; Đurđević (yellow card) 90+4'	Stadium: Stadio Luigi Ferraris; Attendance: 20,309; Referee: Michael Fabbri

6 January 2016 18	Palermo	1–3	Fiorentina	Palermo
15:00 CET (UTC+01:00)	Struna (yellow card) 22'; Gilardino 77'; Morganella (yellow card) 79'; Brugman (yellow card) 81'	Report	Iličić 13', 43'; Bernardeschi (yellow card) 34'; Badelj (yellow card) 73'; Valero (yellow card) 89'; Błaszczykowski 90+3'	Stadium: Stadio Renzo Barbera; Attendance: 13,928; Referee: Antonio Damato

10 January 2016 19	Hellas Verona	0–1	Palermo	Verona
15:00 CET (UTC+01:00)	Pazzini (yellow card) 54'; Toni (yellow card) 70'	Report	Vázquez 27', (yellow card) 74'; Goldaniga (yellow card) 44'; Jajalo (yellow card) 47'; Morganella (yellow card) 83'	Stadium: Stadio Marc'Antonio Bentegodi; Attendance: 15,325; Referee: Luca Banti

17 January 2016 20	Genoa	4–0	Palermo	Genoa
12:30 CET (UTC+01:00)	Suso 4'; Rigoni (yellow card) 58'; Pavoletti 71', 88'; Burdisso (yellow card) 73'; Rincón 75'	Report	Anđelković (yellow card) 22' (yellow-red card) 65'; González (yellow card) 39'; Goldaniga (yellow card) 90'	Stadium: Stadio Luigi Ferraris; Attendance: 19,387; Referee: Domenico Celi

24 January 2016 21	Palermo	4–1	Udinese	Palermo
15:00 CET (UTC+01:00)	Chochev (yellow card) 20'; Quaison 35'; Hiljemark 56'; Jajalo (yellow card) 69'; Lazaar 77'; Trajkovski 87'	Report	Badu (yellow card) 32'; Widmer (yellow card) 44'; Felipe (yellow card) 52'; Théréau 79'	Stadium: Stadio Renzo Barbera; Attendance: 14,325; Referee: Paolo Tagliavento

30 January 2016 22	Carpi	1–1	Palermo	Modena
15:00 CET (UTC+01:00)	Cofie (yellow card) 31'; Letizia (yellow card) 74'; Mancosu 74' (pen.)	Report	Gilardino 24'; Quaison (yellow card) 28'; Vázquez (yellow card) 32'; González (yellow card) 74'	Stadium: Stadio Alberto Braglia; Attendance: 6,835; Referee: Nicola Rizzoli

3 February 2016 23	Palermo	0–2	Milan	Palermo
20:45 CET (UTC+01:00)	Goldaniga (yellow card) 43'; Jajalo (yellow card) 50'; Vázquez (yellow card) 74'	Report	Bacca 19'; Niang 33' (pen.)	Stadium: Stadio Renzo Barbera; Attendance: 17,605; Referee: Paolo Mazzoleni

7 February 2016 24	Sassuolo	2–2	Palermo	Reggio Emilia
15:00 CET (UTC+01:00)	Antei (yellow card) 43'; Defrel 45+1'; Missiroli 50'; Pellegrini (yellow card) 55'; Gazzola (yellow card) 73'	Report	Vázquez 30'; Lazaar (yellow card) 40' (yellow-red card) 75'; Đurđević 53'	Stadium: Mapei Stadium – Città del Tricolore; Attendance: 8,719; Referee: Maurizio Mariani

14 February 2016 25	Palermo	1–3	Torino	Palermo
15:00 CET (UTC+01:00)	Gilardino 2'	Report	Immobile 19' (pen.), 69'; González 31' (o.g.); Vives (yellow card) 40'; Glik (yellow card) 43'	Stadium: Stadio Renzo Barbera; Attendance: 13,820; Referee: Angelo Cervellera

21 February 2016 26	Roma	5–0	Palermo	Rome
20:45 CET (UTC+01:00)	Džeko 30', 89'; Keita 52'; Salah 60', 62'	Report	Struna (yellow card) 75'	Stadium: Stadio Olimpico; Attendance: 27,000; Referee: Piero Giacomelli

28 February 2016 27	Palermo	0–0	Bologna	Palermo
12:30 CET (UTC+01:00)	Chochev (yellow card) 43'; Morganella (yellow card) 63'; Vitiello (yellow card) 90'	Report	Diawara (yellow card) 85'	Stadium: Stadio Renzo Barbera; Attendance: 15,566; Referee: Marco Di Bello

6 March 2016 28	Internazionale	3–1	Palermo	Milan
20:45 CET (UTC+01:00)	Ljajić 11'; Icardi 23'; Perišić 54'; Medel (yellow card) 58'	Report	Vázquez 45'; González (yellow card) 70'	Stadium: San Siro; Attendance: 32,455; Referee: Carmine Russo

13 March 2016 29	Palermo	0–1	Napoli	Palermo
20:45 CET (UTC+01:00)	Chochev (yellow card) 52'; Quaison (yellow card) 84'	Report	Higuaín 23' (pen.); Albiol (yellow card) 75'; López (yellow card) 90+4'	Stadium: Stadio Renzo Barbera; Attendance: 14,628; Referee: Gianluca Rocchi

19 March 2016 30	Empoli	0–0	Palermo	Empoli
18:00 CET (UTC+01:00)	Paredes (yellow card) 68'	Report	Jajalo (yellow card) 55'; Bentivegna (yellow card) 81'	Stadium: Stadio Carlo Castellani; Attendance: 8,597; Referee: Davide Massa

3 April 2016 31	Chievo	3–1	Palermo	Verona
15:00 CEST (UTC+02:00)	Cacciatore 6'; Floro Flores (yellow card) 42'; Rigoni 53'; Birsa 74'; Pinzi (yellow card) 90'	Report	Gilardino 28'; Struna (yellow card) 32'; Anđelković (yellow card) 42'; Vázquez (yellow card) 88'	Stadium: Stadio Marc'Antonio Bentegodi; Attendance: 9,000; Referee: Maurizio Mariani

10 April 2016 32	Palermo	0–3	Lazio	Palermo
15:00 CEST (UTC+02:00)	Quaison (yellow card) 33'; Jajalo (yellow card) 71'	Report	Klose 10', 15'; Parolo (yellow card) 19'; Gentiletti (yellow card) 50'; Anderson 72'; Maurício (yellow card) 88'	Stadium: Stadio Renzo Barbera; Attendance: 22,531; Referee: Andrea Gervasoni

17 April 2016 33	Juventus	4–0	Palermo	Turin
15:00 CEST (UTC+02:00)	Khedira 10'; Barzagli (yellow card) 29'; Pogba 71'; Cuadrado 74'; Morata (yellow card) 86'; Padoin 89'	Report	Hiljemark (yellow card) 29'; Goldaniga (yellow card) 45+1'; González (yellow card) 52'	Stadium: Juventus Stadium; Attendance: 39,133; Referee: Piero Giacomelli

20 April 2016 34	Palermo	2–2	Atalanta	Palermo
20:45 CEST (UTC+02:00)	Vázquez 2' (pen.); Chochev (yellow card) 19'; Struna 76', (yellow card) 81'; Vitiello (red card) 90'; Jajalo (yellow card) 90+1'	Report	Bellini (yellow card) 2'; Borriello 11' (pen.); De Roon (yellow card) 39'; Paletta 55'; Toloi (yellow card) 84'	Stadium: Stadio Renzo Barbera; Referee: Daniele Doveri

24 April 2016 35	Frosinone	0–2	Palermo	Frosinone
15:00 CET (UTC+01:00)	Rosi (yellow card) 45+3'; Blanchard (yellow card) 79'; Soddimo (yellow card) 90'	Report	González (yellow card) 24'; Gilardino 56'; Cionek (yellow card) 78'; Maresca (yellow card) 90'; Trajkovski 90+2'	Stadium: Stadio Matusa; Attendance: 6,095; Referee: Gianluca Rocchi

1 May 2016 36	Palermo	2–0	Sampdoria	Palermo
15:00 CEST (UTC+02:00)	Vázquez 19'; Maresca (yellow card) 45+2'; Krstičić 85' (o.g.)	Report	Krstičić (yellow card) 6'; Dodô (yellow card) 30'; Muriel (yellow card) 63'; Cassani (yellow card) 77'; Viviano (yellow card) 83'	Stadium: Stadio Renzo Barbera; Attendance: 10,023; Referee: Paolo Mazzoleni

8 May 2016 37	Fiorentina	0–0	Palermo	Florence
15:00 CEST (UTC+02:00)	Pasqual (yellow card) 44'; Zárate (yellow card) 67'; Valero (yellow card) 88'	Report	González (yellow card) 18'; Trajkovski (yellow card) 50'; Morganella (yellow card) 59'; Cionek (yellow card) 69'	Stadium: Stadio Artemio Franchi; Attendance: 28,090; Referee: Daniele Orsato

15 May 2016 38	Palermo	3–2	Hellas Verona	Palermo
15:00 CEST (UTC+02:00)	Vázquez 28', (yellow card) 86'; Morganella (red card) 35'; Maresca 51'; Gilardino 64', (yellow card) 65'	Report	Wszołek (red card) 35'; Viviani 48', (yellow card) 68'; Pisano 84'; Checchin (yellow card) 90+1'	Stadium: Stadio Renzo Barbera; Attendance: 33,445; Referee: Massimiliano Irrati

=== Coppa Italia ===
15 August 2015 Third round	Palermo	2–1	Avellino	Palermo
21:00 CEST (UTC+02:00)	Chochev (yellow card) 10'; Rigoni 53', (yellow card) 64'; Quaison 61'; Rispoli (yellow card) 80'; Jajalo (yellow card) 89'	Report	Biraschi (yellow card) 20'; Gavazzi (yellow card) 49'; Trotta 60'; Frattali (yellow card) 86'	Stadium: Stadio Renzo Barbera; Attendance: 9,479; Referee: Claudio Gavillucci

2 December 2015 Fourth round	Palermo	2–3	Alessandria	Palermo
21:00 CET (UTC+01:00)	Rispoli (yellow card) 3'; Vázquez (red card) 22'; Quaison (yellow card) 53'; Trajkovski 55'; Daprelà (yellow card) 75'; Gilardino 85'	Report	Loviso 4' (pen.); Sirri (yellow card) 18'; Marconi 23'; Nicco (yellow card) 78', (goal) 82'; Sabato (yellow card) 80' (red card) 83'; Branca (yellow card) 90'	Stadium: Stadio Renzo Barbera; Referee: Luigi Nasca

== Statistics ==
=== Appearances and goals ===
No.	Pos	Nat	Player	Total		Serie A		Coppa Italia	
No.	Pos	Nat	Player	Apps	Goals	Apps	Goals	Apps	Goals
Goalkeepers
1	GK	(Croatia) CRO	Josip Posavec	1	0	1	0	0	0
53	GK	(Italy) ITA	Fabrizio Alastra	2	0	1+1	0	0	0
55	GK	(Italy) ITA	Leonardo Marson	0	0	0	0	0	0
70	GK	(Italy) ITA	Stefano Sorrentino	36	0	35	0	1	0
Defenders
2	DF	(Italy) ITA	Roberto Vitiello	11	0	8+2	0	1	0
3	DF	(Italy) ITA	Andrea Rispoli	24	0	16+6	0	2	0
4	DF	(Slovenia) SLO	Siniša Anđelković	24	0	21+2	0	1	0
6	DF	(Italy) ITA	Edoardo Goldaniga	17	2	14+3	2	0	0
7	DF	(Morocco) MAR	Achraf Lazaar	31	1	26+4	1	1	0
12	DF	(Costa Rica) CRC	Giancarlo González	36	2	35	2	1	0
15	DF	(Poland) POL	Thiago Cionek	5	0	5	0	0	0
23	DF	(Slovenia) SLO	Aljaž Struna	22	1	22	1	0	0
77	DF	(Switzerland) SUI	Michel Morganella	15	0	11+3	0	0+1	0
97	DF	(Italy) ITA	Giuseppe Pezzella	10	0	7+2	0	0+1	0
Midfielders
10	MF	(Sweden) SWE	Oscar Hiljemark	39	4	36+2	4	1	0
16	MF	(Uruguay) URU	Gastón Brugman	14	0	10+4	0	0	0
18	MF	(Bulgaria) BUL	Ivaylo Chochev	28	0	21+6	0	1	0
20	MF	(Argentina) ARG	Franco Vázquez	38	7	36	7	2	0
21	MF	(Sweden) SWE	Robin Quaison	32	2	14+16	1	1+1	1
24	MF	(Italy) ITA	Bryan Cristante	4	0	1+3	0	0	0
25	MF	(Italy) ITA	Enzo Maresca	16	0	10+5	0	1	0
28	MF	(Croatia) CRO	Mato Jajalo	29	0	24+4	0	1	0
Forwards
8	FW	(North Macedonia) MKD	Aleksandar Trajkovski	33	4	16+16	3	1	1
9	FW	(Italy) ITA	Accursio Bentivegna	1	0	0+1	0	0	0
11	FW	(Italy) ITA	Alberto Gilardino	34	10	26+7	9	0+1	1
22	FW	(Hungary) HUN	Norbert Balogh	4	0	0+4	0	0	0
54	FW	(Italy) ITA	Antonino La Gumina	3	0	0+3	0	0	0
99	FW	(Serbia) SRB	Uroš Đurđević	14	2	5+9	2	0	0
Players transferred out during the season
9	FW	(Italy) ITA	Andrea Belotti	1	0	0	0	1	0
27	MF	(Italy) ITA	Luca Rigoni	12	2	8+2	1	2	1
33	DF	(Switzerland) SUI	Fabio Daprelà	7	0	1+4	0	1+1	0
34	DF	(Morocco) MAR	Abdelhamid El Kaoutari	9	1	7	1	2	0
91	GK	(Italy) ITA	Simone Colombi	2	0	1	0	1	0

Last updated: 15 May 2016
Source: Competitions

=== Goalscorers ===
Rank	No.	Pos	Nat	Name	Serie A	Coppa Italia	Total
1	11	FW	(Italy)	Alberto Gilardino	10	1	11
2	20	MF	(Argentina)	Franco Vázquez	8	0	8
3	8	MF	(North Macedonia)	Aleksandar Trajkovski	3	1	4
3	10	MF	(Sweden)	Oscar Hiljemark	4	0	4
5	6	DF	(Italy)	Edoardo Goldaniga	2	0	2
5	12	DF	(Costa Rica)	Giancarlo González	2	0	2
5	21	MF	(Sweden)	Robin Quaison	1	1	2
5	27	MF	(Italy)	Luca Rigoni	1	1	2
5	99	FW	(Serbia)	Uroš Đurđević	2	0	2
10	7	DF	(Morocco)	Achraf Lazaar	1	0	1
10	23	DF	(Slovenia)	Aljaž Struna	1	0	1
10	25	MF	(Italy)	Enzo Maresca	1	0	1
10	34	DF	(Morocco)	Abdelhamid El Kaoutari	1	0	1
Own goal					1	0	1
Total					38	4	42

Last updated: 15 May 2016

=== Clean sheets ===
Rank	No.	Pos	Nat	Name	Serie A	Coppa Italia	Total
1	70	GK	(Italy)	Stefano Sorrentino	9	0	9
2	1	GK	(Croatia)	Josip Posavec	1	0	1
Totals					10	0	10

Last updated: 8 May 2016
