= Accursio Bentivegna =

Italian footballer (born 1996)

Personal information
- Date of birth: 21 June 1996 (age 30)
- Place of birth: Sciacca, Italy
- Height: 1.70 m (5 ft 7 in)
- Position: Forward

Team information
- Current team: Casertana
- Number: 20

Youth career
- 2010–2015: Palermo

Senior career*
Years	Team	Apps	(Gls)
2014–2018	Palermo	7	(0)
2015	→ Como (loan)	15	(1)
2017	→ Ascoli (loan)	11	(0)
2017–2018	→ Carrarese (loan)	31	(5)
2018–2020	Carrarese	28	(1)
2020–2024	Juve Stabia	71	(10)
2021	→ Imolese (loan)	17	(3)
2024	→ Novara (loan)	16	(3)
2024–2025	Pescara	28	(7)
2025–	Casertana	35	(9)

International career
2013	Italy U17	1	(0)
2014	Italy U18	4	(6)
2014–2015	Italy U19	5	(0)
2015	Italy U20	2	(0)
- * Club domestic league appearances and goals as of 1 May 2026

Accursio Bentivegna (born 21 June 1996) is an Italian professional footballer who plays as a forward for Serie C Group C club Casertana.

== Club career ==
Born in Sciacca, Province of Agrigento, Sicily, Bentivegna started his career at Palermo, playing for their Primavera side. He made his Serie A debut for Palermo against Sampdoria as a substitute replacing Franco Vázquez. On 31 August 2014, he moved to Como on loan. He scored his first goal for Como on 27 October 2015, in a 3−1 defeat against Cesena. After scarcely playing for Palermo's first team, he was loaned out to Serie B club Ascoli in January 2017.

On 18 September 2020, he joined Juve Stabia. On 7 January 2021, he was loaned to Imolese. On 23 January 2024, Bentivegna was loaned by Novara.

On 19 July 2024, Bentivegna signed with Pescara.

== Career statistics ==
=== Club ===
As of match played 16 April 2022

Appearances and goals by club, season and competition
Club	Season	League			Coppa Italia		Other		Total	
Club	Season	Division	Apps	Goals	Apps	Goals	Apps	Goals	Apps	Goals
Palermo	2014–15	Serie A	3	0	0	0	—		3	0
Palermo	2015–16	Serie A	1	0	0	0	—		1	0
Palermo	2016–17	Serie A	3	0	1	0	—		4	0
Palermo	Total		7	0	1	0	0	0	8	0
Como (loan)	2015–16	Serie B	15	1	0	0	—		15	1
Ascoli (loan)	2016–17	Serie B	11	0	0	0	—		11	0
Carrarese (loan)	2017–18	Serie C	31	5	—		—		31	5
Carrarese	2018–19	Serie C	24	1	—		4 (Note: Appearance(s) in promotion play-offs)	1	28	2
Carrarese	2019–20	Serie C	4	0	2	0	1	0	7	0
Carrarese	Total		28	1	2	0	5	1	35	2
Juve Stabia	2020–21	Serie C	5	0	2	0	—		7	0
Juve Stabia	2021–22	Serie C	36	9	—		—		36	9
Juve Stabia	Total		41	9	2	0	0	0	43	9
Imolese (loan)	2020–21	Serie C	17	3	—		2 (Note: Appearance(s) in relegation play-offs)	0	19	3
Career total			150	19	5	0	7	1	162	20
