= Andrea Belotti =

Italian footballer (born 1993)

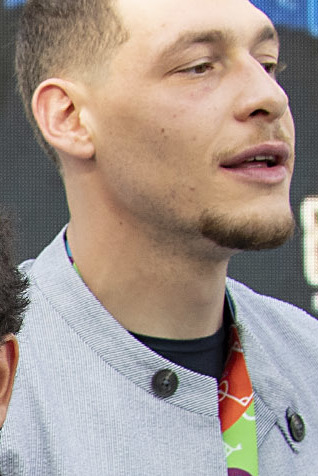
- Belotti in 2021

Personal information
- Full name: Andrea Belotti
- Date of birth: 20 December 1993 (age 32)
- Place of birth: Calcinate, Italy
- Height: 1.82 m (6 ft 0 in)
- Position: Striker

Team information
- Current team: Modena
- Number: 11

Youth career
- 2000–2006: Grumellese
- 2006–2012: AlbinoLeffe

Senior career*
Years	Team	Apps	(Gls)
2012–2013	AlbinoLeffe	39	(14)
2013–2015	Palermo	62	(16)
2015–2022	Torino	232	(100)
2022–2024	Roma	45	(3)
2024	→ Fiorentina (loan)	15	(3)
2024–2025	Como	18	(2)
2025	→ Benfica (loan)	14	(3)
2025–2026	Cagliari	8	(2)
2026–	Modena	4	(3)

International career^{‡}
2011–2012	Italy U19	6	(2)
2012–2013	Italy U20	9	(4)
2013–2015	Italy U21	18	(9)
2016–2022	Italy	44	(12)
Medal record
Men's Football
Representing Italy
UEFA European Championship
Winner	2020 Europe
CONMEBOL–UEFA Cup of Champions
Runner-up	2022 England
- * Club domestic league appearances and goals as of 07:46, 18 October 2026 (UTC) ‡ National team caps and goals as of 7 June 2022

Andrea Belotti Cavaliere OMRI (Italian pronunciation: [anˈdrɛːa beˈlɔtti]; born 20 December 1993) is an Italian professional footballer who plays as a striker for Serie B club Modena.

Belotti started his career with AlbinoLeffe. He was later signed by Palermo, where he won a Serie B title in the 2013–14 season, before joining Torino in 2015. Belotti left the club in 2022 as their eighth-highest goalscorer of all time, and joined Roma on a free transfer.

A former Italy under-19, under-20 and under-21 international, Belotti took part in the UEFA European Under-21 Championship in 2015. He made his debut with the senior national team in 2016, and was included in the Italy squad that won UEFA Euro 2020.

== Early life ==
Andrea Belotti was born in Calcinate, a small town in close vicinity of Bergamo in northern Italy. He is nicknamed Il Gallo (The Rooster). The nickname comes from the surname of his close childhood friend, who jokingly suggested he celebrates his goals by mimicking a rooster's comb with an open hand to his forehead. Belotti was a childhood fan of AC Milan.

== Club career ==
=== AlbinoLeffe ===
Belotti took his first steps as a footballer in the oratory school of Gorlago, and with Grumellese. After an unsuccessful trial with Atalanta, he was signed by AlbinoLeffe and went through their youth system. He made his debut for the first team in the 2011–12 season, when he played eight matches in Serie B and scored two goals. He also scored 13 goals as team top-scorer for the youth team throughout the 2011–12 season, winning a youth title, the Trofeo Dossena, in June 2012.

The following season, he was fully promoted to the first team, and made 31 appearances in Lega Pro Prima Divisione, scoring 12 goals. He also made an appearance during the 2012–13 Coppa Italia. Given the presence in the squad of the defender Mauro Belotti, Andrea was nicknamed Belottino.

=== Palermo ===
On 2 September 2013, he was loaned for a fee of €500,000 (with a buyout clause set at €2.5 million) to Palermo in Serie B. He made his debut with the Sicilians on 24 September 2013, as a substitute for Davide Di Gennaro in a game against Bari, and provided an assist to Kyle Lafferty in a 2–1 loss. He scored his first goal for the Rosaneri on 5 October against Brescia. On 3 May 2014, he was promoted to Serie A after a 1–0 win away to Novara. He closed the season with 10 goals scored in the league. On 18 June 2014, Palermo exercised the right to redeem half of his contract in co-ownership, with an option to redeem the other half for €3.5 million.

He made his debut in Serie A on 31 August 2014, at age 20, as a substitute for Paulo Dybala in a 1–1 draw at home to Sampdoria. On 12 September, Palermo announced they had redeemed the remainder of his contract. On 24 September, he scored his first two career goals in Serie A, playing as a starter in a 3–3 draw away to Napoli. On 13 December, he scored the winning goal in injury time against Sassuolo, securing a 2–1 win for Palermo and their seventh consecutive useful result (equalling the record of the 2009–10 season under the coach Delio Rossi). He played in 38 games throughout the season, largely as a substitute, in which he scored six goals.

=== Torino ===
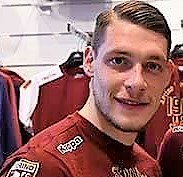
Belotti with Torino in 2017

On 18 August 2015, he was officially signed by Torino for a reported fee of €7.5 million. He scored his first goal for Torino in a 2–0 win against Bologna. On 16 January 2016, he scored his first brace for the club in a 4–2 win over Frosinone. On 20 March, he scored from the penalty spot in the 48th minute to halt Juventus goalkeeper Gianluigi Buffon's record of longest consecutive minutes not conceded in a 4–1 home defeat. He concluded the 2015–16 season with 12 goals in 35 appearances.

He began the 2016–17 season scoring a header against AC Milan at the San Siro, but had a penalty saved by Gianluigi Donnarumma in a 3–2 defeat. The following round, on 28 August, he scored his first career hat-trick in a 5–1 home win against Bologna. On 4 December 2016, he extended his contract with Torino until 2021, with a €100 million release clause valid only to foreign clubs. On 5 March 2017, he wore the captain's armband for the first time against Palermo, in which he scored the fastest hat-trick in Serie A since 30 January 2000 (seven minutes and 15 seconds), surpassing the previous record belonging to the Ukrainian Andriy Shevchenko. The following month, he became the first player under the age of 24 to score 24 goals in a single Serie A season since Shevchenko in 1999–00. He ended the season with 26 goals in 35 appearances, and as the third top-scorer in the league behind Edin Džeko of Roma (29) and Dries Mertens of Napoli (28).

After being appointed team captain on a permanent basis, he scored his first goal of the 2017–18 season with a scissor-kick in a 3–0 win against Sassuolo. Often injured, he was unable to repeat his performance of the previous season, scoring 10 goals in Serie A.

On 26 August 2018, Belotti scored his first goal of the 2018–19 season in a 2–2 draw against Inter Milan at the San Siro. On 4 November, he scored his first brace of the season in a 4–1 away win against Sampdoria. On 25 May, he scored the second scissor kick goal of his career, once again against Sassuolo. In virtue of his performance during the season, he was voted as Torino's player of the year (succeeding Nicolas Nkoulou). Belotti concluded the season with 15 goals in Serie A - contributing to Torino's qualification to the 2019–20 UEFA Europa League, after the exclusion of Milan.

On 25 July 2019, Belotti made his debut in UEFA competitions, in the first qualifying round of the Europa League against Debrecen, scoring the opening goal on a penalty kick. On 29 August, Belotti scored with a header against Wolverhampton to record his 77th goal for Torino, entering in Torino's top 10 goalscorers of all-time. On 26 September, he scored his first brace of the season in a 2–1 win over Milan. On 23 June 2020, by virtue a goal scored in a home match against Udinese (1–0), he reached double-figures in Serie A for the fifth consecutive season. On 16 July 2020, Belotti scored in his seventh Serie A match in a row in a 3–0 win over Genoa.

On 12 December 2020, in a league match lost 3–2 at home against Udinese, he scored his 100th goal for Torino in all competitions, equalling Adolfo Baloncieri in the club's all-time scorer list. On 30 January 2021, with a goal scored at Fiorentina, Belotti achieved double figures in the league for all six season played in Serie A with Torino (behind only Paolo Pulici, who achieved double figures for seven consecutive years between 1972 and 1979).

Belotti began his seventh consecutive season with Torino scoring a goal in a 2–1 loss at home to Atalanta. On 30 October 2021, Belotti scored the final goal in a 3–0 win against Sampdoria, achieving the milestone of 100 goals in Serie A (94 goals scored, up to that moment with Torino in seven season and six goals with Palermo).

On 1 July 2022, Torino announced that Belotti would not extend and leave for free.

=== Roma ===
On 28 August 2022, Belotti signed an initial one-year contract with Roma that runs until 30 June 2023. As part of the overall agreement there is also the option for an additional two-year extension, based on certain performance-related criteria.

Belotti scored his first goal for Roma against Cremonese in the Coppa Italia on 1 February 2023. He ended his first season at Roma featuring in 31 league matches without scoring any goals. However, he extended his contract until 2025.

==== Loan to Fiorentina ====
On 1 February 2024, Belotti moved on loan to Fiorentina. On 2 May, he scored Fiorentina's second goal in a 3–2 home win over Club Brugge in the first leg of the UEFA Europa Conference League semi-finals. On 29 May, Belotti started in Fiorentina's 1–0 extra time defeat against Olympiacos in the Europa Conference League final.

=== Como ===
On 25 June 2024, Belotti signed a two-year contract with newly promoted Serie A club Como, for a reported fee of €4 million plus an additional €1 million in add-ons.

==== Loan to Benfica ====
On 3 February 2025, Belotti joined Primeira Liga club Benfica on loan until the end of the 2024–25 season.

=== Cagliari ===
On 1 September 2025, Cagliari signed Belotti for free on a permanent deal.

=== Modena ===
On 8 September 2026, Belotti joined Serie B club Modena as a free agent on a one-year deal.

== International career ==
=== Youth ===
Belotti received his first call-up to the Italy under-19 side in December 2011 against the Lega Pro representative squad; he scored a goal in the match, which the under-19 side won 4–2. In the 2012 UEFA European Under-19 Football Championship elite qualification round he featured as Italy's centre-forward in the team's 4–2–3–1 formation, scoring once in three appearances.

Belotti made nine appearances for the under-20 (scoring four goals), before making his debut for the under-21 team on 14 August 2013 in a 4–1 friendly victory against Slovakia. On 5 September he featured in the 2015 UEFA European Under-21 Championship qualification 3–1 loss at home to Belgium, later scoring his first goal in the group on 14 November, in a 3–0 win against Northern Ireland. On 5 September 2014 he scored his first brace for the team in a European Championship qualifier against Serbia, which ended in a 3–2 victory for Italy.

Under manager Luigi Di Biagio, Belotti took part in the 2015 UEFA European Under-21 Championship in the Czech Republic, scoring the opening goal in a 3–1 defeat of England in Italy's final group match, although the result was not enough to see the Italian under-21 side progress to the semi-finals, as the azzurrini finished third in their group, behind the two eventual finalists Portugal and Sweden.

=== Senior ===
On 27 August 2016, Belotti was called up to the senior squad for the first time by Gian Piero Ventura for a friendly against France on 1 September and a 2018 World Cup qualification match on 5 September against Israel. He made his senior international debut in the friendly against France, coming on as a substitute in a 3–1 home loss. Belotti scored his first senior goal on 9 October, the opening goal of their third World Cup qualification match, a 3–2 away victory over Macedonia.

In June 2021, Belotti was included in Italy's squad for UEFA Euro 2020 by manager Roberto Mancini. On 6 July, following a 1–1 draw after extra-time against Spain in the semi-final of the competition, Belotti scored Italy's second spot-kick in an eventual 4–2 penalty shoot-out victory, to send Italy to the final. On 11 July, Belotti won the European Championship with Italy following a 3–2 penalty shoot-out victory over England at Wembley Stadium in the final, after a 1–1 draw in extra-time; Belotti came on as a substitute late in the second half of regulation time for Lorenzo Insigne, and in the shoot-out, he took Italy's second penalty, which was saved by Jordan Pickford.

== Style of play ==
"He's an example because God didn't bless him with huge talent, but with greater values like generosity, enthusiasm and passion."

— Arrigo Sacchi.

Belotti began his career as a midfielder and winger, but under the guidance of AlbinoLeffe's youth coach Alessio Pala, was converted to a forward. Compared to Gianluca Vialli for his athleticism and style of play, Belotti is a quick, physical, and prolific striker, who has a strong and powerful shot with either foot. He is strong in aerial duels, and stands out for his acceleration, tactical intelligence, positioning, work-rate, and eye for goal, which, along with his speed, allows him to lose his markers by making attacking runs into the penalty area. Although he is primarily deployed as an out-and-out striker or centre-forward, he is also capable of playing as a second striker, due to his ability to hold up the ball with his back to goal and link-up with teammates, in addition to scoring goals himself.

An acrobatic player, he has also scored several overhead kick goals in his career. Belotti's playing style has also been likened to that of Ukrainian former striker Andriy Shevchenko, who was a major influence on him in his youth; he has also been compared to former Italy striker Giorgio Chinaglia, as well as fellow former Torino strikers Francesco Graziani and Christian Vieri.

== Personal life ==
Belotti married Giorgia Duro on 15 June 2017. They have a dog called Angi. In February 2021, Belotti tested positive for COVID-19 amid its pandemic in Italy; during his isolation period, his wife gave birth to their daughter Vittoria on 22 February.

== Career statistics ==
=== Club ===
As of match played 17 October 2026

Appearances and goals by club, season and competition
Club	Season	League			National cup (Note: Includes Coppa Italia, Taça de Portugal)		Europe		Other		Total	
Club	Season	Division	Apps	Goals	Apps	Goals	Apps	Goals	Apps	Goals	Apps	Goals
AlbinoLeffe	2011–12	Serie B	8	2	0	0	—		—		8	2
AlbinoLeffe	2012–13	Lega Pro Prima Divisione	31	12	1	0	—		—		32	12
AlbinoLeffe	2013–14	Lega Pro Prima Divisione	—		1	0	—		—		1	0
AlbinoLeffe	Total		39	14	2	0	—		—		41	14
Palermo	2013–14	Serie B	24	10	0	0	—		—		24	10
Palermo	2014–15	Serie A	38	6	1	0	—		—		39	6
Palermo	2015–16	Serie A	—		1	0	—		—		1	0
Palermo	Total		62	16	2	0	—		—		64	16
Torino	2015–16	Serie A	35	12	1	0	—		—		36	12
Torino	2016–17	Serie A	35	26	3	2	—		—		38	28
Torino	2017–18	Serie A	32	10	3	3	—		—		35	13
Torino	2018–19	Serie A	37	15	2	2	—		—		39	17
Torino	2019–20	Serie A	36	16	2	0	6 (Note: Appearances in UEFA Europa League)	6	—		44	22
Torino	2020–21	Serie A	35	13	1	0	—		—		36	13
Torino	2021–22	Serie A	22	8	1	0	—		—		23	8
Torino	Total		232	100	13	7	6	6	—		251	113
Roma	2022–23	Serie A	31	0	1	1	14	3	—		46	4
Roma	2023–24	Serie A	14	3	2	0	6	3	—		22	6
Roma	Total		45	3	3	1	20	6	—		68	10
Fiorentina (loan)	2023–24	Serie A	15	3	2	0	7 (Note: Appearances in UEFA Europa Conference League)	1	—		24	4
Como	2024–25	Serie A	18	2	1	0	—		—		19	2
Benfica (loan)	2024–25	Primeira Liga	14	3	4	1	4 (Note: Appearances in UEFA Champions League)	0	2 (Note: Appearances in FIFA Club World Cup)	0	24	4
Cagliari	2025–26	Serie A	8	2	0	0	—		—		8	2
Modena	2026–27	Serie B	4	3	—		—		—		4	3
Career total			434	144	27	9	37	13	2	0	500	166

=== International ===
As of match played 7 June 2022

Appearances and goals by national team and year
National team	Year	Apps	Goals
Italy	2016	5	3
Italy	2017	8	1
Italy	2018	7	1
Italy	2019	7	4
Italy	2020	4	1
Italy	2021	10	2
Italy	2022	3	0
Total		44	12

Scores and results list Italy's goal tally first, score column indicates score after each Belotti goal.

List of international goals scored by Andrea Belotti
No.	Date	Venue	Opponent	Score	Result	Competition
1	9 October 2016	Philip II Arena, Skopje, Macedonia	Macedonia	1–0	3–2	2018 FIFA World Cup qualification
2	12 November 2016	Rheinpark Stadion, Vaduz, Liechtenstein	Liechtenstein	1–0	4–0	2018 FIFA World Cup qualification
3	12 November 2016	Rheinpark Stadion, Vaduz, Liechtenstein	Liechtenstein	4–0	4–0	2018 FIFA World Cup qualification
4	11 June 2017	Stadio Friuli, Udine, Italy	Liechtenstein	2–0	5–0	2018 FIFA World Cup qualification
5	28 May 2018	Kybunpark, St. Gallen, Switzerland	Saudi Arabia	2–0	2–1	Friendly
6	5 September 2019	Republican Stadium, Yerevan, Armenia	Armenia	1–1	3–1	UEFA Euro 2020 qualification
7	15 October 2019	Rheinpark Stadion, Vaduz, Liechtenstein	Liechtenstein	2–0	5–0	UEFA Euro 2020 qualification
8	15 October 2019	Rheinpark Stadion, Vaduz, Liechtenstein	Liechtenstein	5–0	5–0	UEFA Euro 2020 qualification
9	15 November 2019	Bilino Polje Stadium, Zenica, Bosnia and Herzegovina	Bosnia and Herzegovina	3–0	3–0	UEFA Euro 2020 qualification
10	18 November 2020	Stadion Grbavica, Sarajevo, Bosnia and Herzegovina	Bosnia and Herzegovina	1–0	2–0	2020–21 UEFA Nations League A
11	28 March 2021	Vasil Levski National Stadium, Sofia, Bulgaria	Bulgaria	1–0	2–0	2022 FIFA World Cup qualification
12	28 May 2021	Sardegna Arena, Cagliari, Italy	San Marino	4–0	7–0	Friendly

== Honours ==
Palermo

- Serie B: 2013–14

Italy

- UEFA European Championship: 2020

Individual

- Pallone d'Argento: 2016–17
- Giuseppe Prisco Award: 2017
- Gazzetta Sports Awards Performance of the Year: 2017
- Premio Nazionale Carriera Esemplare "Gaetano Scirea": 2020

Orders

- 5th Class / Knight: Cavaliere Ordine al Merito della Repubblica Italiana: 2021
