= Franco Vázquez =

Argentine football player

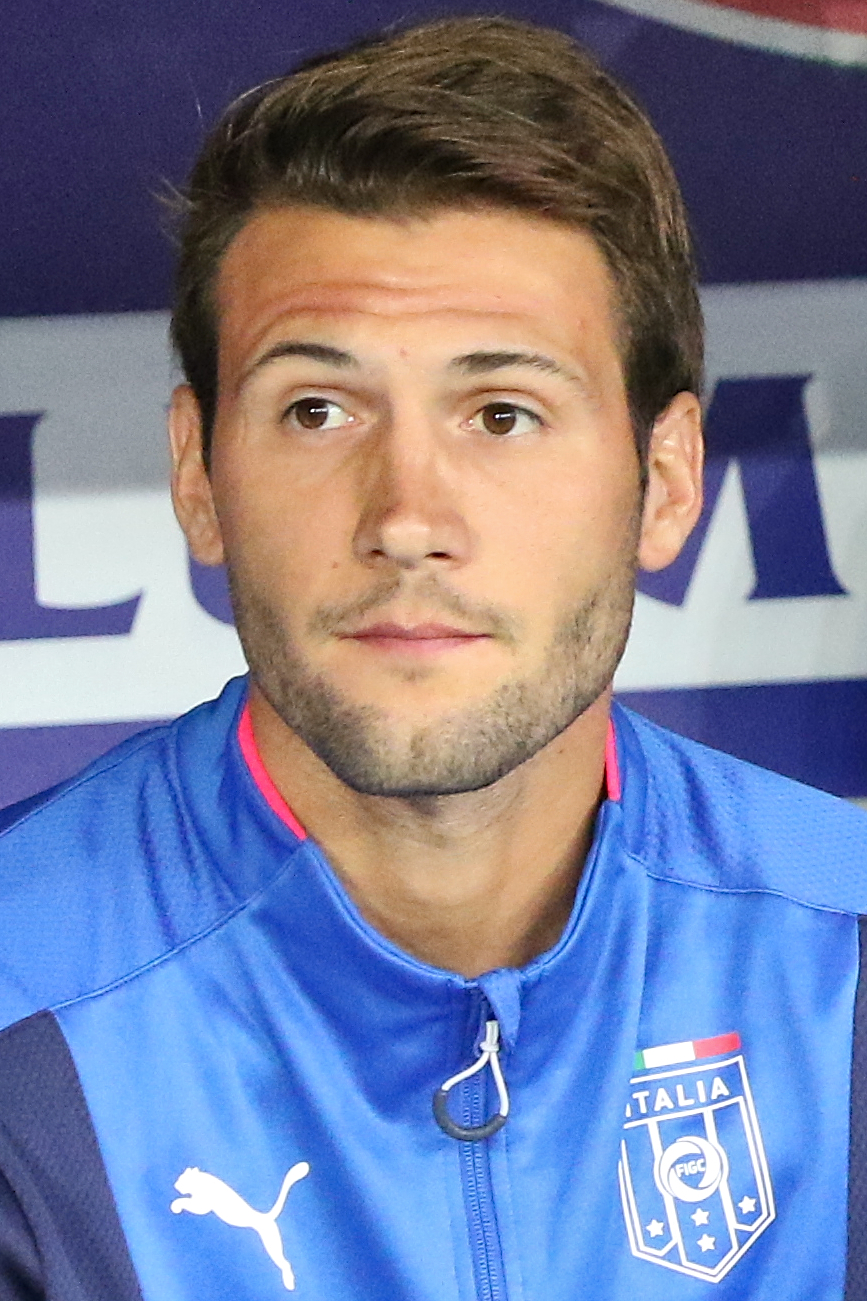
- Vázquez with Italy in 2015

Personal information
- Full name: Franco Damián Vázquez
- Date of birth: 22 February 1989 (age 37)
- Place of birth: Tanti, Argentina
- Height: 1.87 m (6 ft 2 in)
- Position: Attacking midfielder

Team information
- Current team: Belgrano
- Number: 20

Youth career
- 2003–2005: Barrio Parque
- 2005–2007: Belgrano

Senior career*
Years	Team	Apps	(Gls)
2007–2011	Belgrano	91	(13)
2012–2016	Palermo	104	(22)
2012–2013	→ Rayo Vallecano (loan)	18	(3)
2016–2021	Sevilla	140	(18)
2021–2023	Parma	70	(25)
2023–2026	Cremonese	77	(13)
2026–	Belgrano	19	(2)

International career^{‡}
2015	Italy	2	(0)
2018	Argentina	3	(0)
- * Club domestic league appearances and goals as of 17:45, 25 May 2026 (UTC) ‡ National team caps and goals as of 8 September 2018

Franco Damián Vázquez (Spanish pronunciation: [ˈfɾaŋko ðaˈmjam ˈbaskes]; born 22 February 1989) is an Argentine professional footballer who plays as an attacking midfielder for Belgrano.

Beginning his career with Argentine club Belgrano in 2007, Vázquez moved to Italian side Palermo in 2011. After a brief loan spell in Spain with Rayo Vallecano during the 2012–13 season, he made his breakthrough with the Sicilian club, earning a transfer to La Liga side Sevilla in 2016.

Vázquez holds both Argentine and Italian nationalities as his mother was born in Italy. Internationally, he played for Italy in two friendly matches in 2015, but later declared his intention to represent his birth nation; he played three games for Argentina in 2018.

== Early life ==
Vázquez was born in Argentina to an Italian mother (born in Padua) and an Argentine father, therefore Vázquez holds both passports.

As a youngster he was nicknamed "El mudo", which means "Mute" in Spanish, due to his introverted nature. In his native Argentina, he is often referred to by the aforementioned nickname.

== Club career ==
=== Belgrano ===
Nicknamed "El Mudo" ("The Mute") due to his introversion in his youth, Vázquez began his career at Argentine club Belgrano, with whom he debuted in 2007 and then became a mainstay at the club, achieving interest from a number of Italian clubs (the first being Parma in 2010) as a consequence.

=== Palermo ===
In August 2011, Vázquez was heavily linked with a move to Italian side Palermo as a replacement for fellow Argentine Javier Pastore. The move, effective from January 2012, was confirmed on 1 September 2011 for a €4.53 million transfer fee. He officially joined the Palermo squad on 29 December 2011, then debuted on 8 January in a match against Napoli. He made a total 14 appearances (mostly as a substitute) and scored no goals.

=== Loan to Rayo Vallecano ===
On 24 August 2012, Vázquez moved on loan to La Liga club Rayo Vallecano. He mostly played as a substitute and failed to make a breakthrough in the first team squad, not being signed permanently by the club at the end of the season and therefore returning to Palermo.

=== Return to Palermo ===
Vázquez was originally kept out of the squad list by head coach Gennaro Gattuso and therefore ineligible to play in any matches for the first half of the 2013–14 Serie B season. However, he was reincluded into the first team roster by new boss Giuseppe Iachini later in January 2014 as a replacement to on-loan youngster Valerio Verre. Vázquez was then being used also as a second striker in a more regular basis, a role that gave him the opportunity to score goals. In the following 2014–15 Serie A campaign, Vázquez gained notoriety thanks to him forming a successful and effective striking partnership with Paulo Dybala, which saw them both finish the season as two of the top assist providers in the league, with ten assists. On 16 January 2015, he agreed a contract extension with Palermo lasting until 30 June 2019. On 15 May 2016, he scored in a 3–2 home win over Hellas Verona to help save Palermo from relegation at the conclusion of the 2015–16 Serie A season.

=== Sevilla ===
On 16 July 2016, Vázquez returned to Spain's top flight, joining Sevilla for a reported €15 million transfer fee. On 9 August, in his first official appearance for his new club, he scored in a 3–2 extra-time defeat to Real Madrid in the 2016 UEFA Super Cup. On 20 August, he scored and assisted on his La Liga debut in a 6–4 home victory over Espanyol.

=== Parma ===
On 26 June 2021, he signed a two-year contract with Serie B club Parma, with an option to renew.

=== Cremonese ===
On 17 July 2023, Vázquez moved to Cremonese on a one-season deal.

=== Return to Belgrano ===
On 26 January 2026, Vázquez returned to Belgrano with a two-year contract.

== International career ==
=== Italy ===
A dual Argentine-Italian citizen, Vázquez had declared he was uncertain about whether to accept the possible upcoming call-up from Italy in 2014. Later in January 2015, he stated he would likely accept a call-up from then-Italy head coach Antonio Conte, in part because of the heavy competition for a spot in the Argentina national team. However, he later accepted the call, and then regretted it, declaring instead his intentions to represent Argentina. Vázquez has appeared in two international matches for Italy, both friendlies and therefore remains eligible to play for La Albiceleste.

On 21 March 2015, Vázquez received his first Italy national team call up for a UEFA Euro 2016 qualifying match against Bulgaria and a friendly match against England. Italy head coach Antonio Conte was criticised for calling up Argentine-born Vázquez as well as Brazilian-born Éder. Speaking at a Serie A meeting on 23 March 2015, Roberto Mancini said, "The Italian national team should be Italian. An Italian player deserves to play for the national team while someone who wasn't born in Italy, even if they have relatives, I don't think they deserve to." Conte's response to the use of foreign-born players was, "If Mauro Camoranesi [who was born in Argentina] was allowed to help Italy win the 2006 World Cup, then why can't Éder and Franco Vázquez lead the Azzurri to glory in next year's European Championship?"

Vázquez made his international debut in Italy's 1–1 friendly draw against England at Juventus Stadium in Turin on 31 March 2015, coming on as a substitute for fellow oriundo Éder. He made his second appearance for Italy later that year, as a substitute in a 1–0 friendly defeat to Portugal in Geneva, on 16 June.

=== Argentina ===
In August 2016, Vázquez declared his wish to represent his country of birth, Argentina, at international level, instead of Italy. In August 2018, Vázquez was called up by Argentina for their September friendlies. On 7 September 2018, Vázquez made his debut with Argentina in a 3–0 win over Guatemala, as he came on as a 56th-minute substitute. His two remaining appearances for Argentina come later that same year, with Vázquez starting in a 4–0 friendly win over Iraq in Riad on 11 October, and coming on as a substitute for Dybala in a 2–0 friendly home win over Mexico on 16 November.

== Style of play ==
Vázquez is a quick, talented, and mobile left-footed player, who, despite not being particularly fast, possesses a decent burst of acceleration and good physical strength, as well as excellent dribbling skills, close control, and a solid first touch, which enables him to turn past challenges, beat opposing players, and run towards goal during counter-attacks, or retain the ball in tight spaces and hold up the ball for teammates with his back to goal; he also has a penchant for using the nutmeg, which is often a trademark move he utilises in order to get past his opponents. On top of his technical skills, flair, creativity, and elegant movements on the ball, he is also known for his vision and passing ability, which make him an effective assist provider. Indeed, during the 2014–15 Serie A season, he was one of the joint top assist providers in the league, alongside his teammate Dybala, with ten assists. In addition to his creative abilities, he is also capable of contributing to his team's offence with goals, due to his accurate striking ability from distance. A hard-working and tactically versatile player, he is usually deployed as an attacking midfielder, although he has also been deployed in several other positions: he has been used as a winger, as a deep-lying playmaker in midfield, as a false 9, as a second forward, and even as an offensive-minded central midfielder, known as the mezz'ala role, in Italian. His playing style has drawn comparisons with Javier Pastore, Juan Román Riquelme, Alessandro Del Piero, and Roberto Baggio.

== Career statistics ==
=== Club ===
As of match played 29 August 2025

Club statistics
Club	Season	League			Cup		League Cup		Other		Total	
Club	Season	Division	Apps	Goals	Apps	Goals	Apps	Goals	Apps	Goals	Apps	Goals
Belgrano	2008–09	Primera B Nacional	15	1	0	0	—		2 (Note: Appearances in the 2008–09 Promotion play-offs)	0	17	1
Belgrano	2009–10	Primera B Nacional	31	4	0	0	—		—		31	4
Belgrano	2010–11	Primera B Nacional	27	5	0	0	—		2 (Note: Appearances in the 2010–11 Promotion play-offs)	0	29	5
Belgrano	2011–12	Argentine Primera División	18	3	0	0	—		—		18	3
Belgrano	Total		91	13	0	0	0	0	4	0	95	13
Palermo	2011–12	Serie A	14	0	0	0	—		—		14	0
Palermo	2012–13	Serie A	0	0	0	0	—		—		0	0
Palermo	2013–14	Serie B	18	4	1	0	—		—		19	4
Palermo	2014–15	Serie A	37	10	1	0	—		—		38	10
Palermo	2015–16	Serie A	35	8	2	0	—		—		37	8
Palermo	Total		104	22	4	0	0	0	0	0	108	22
Rayo Vallecano (loan)	2012–13	La Liga	18	3	1	0	—		—		19	3
Sevilla	2016–17	La Liga	30	7	0	0	—		8 (Note: Five Appearances in the UEFA Champions League, Two Appearances in the Supercopa de España and One Appearance in the UEFA Super Cup)	1	38	8
Sevilla	2017–18	La Liga	30	4	7	1	—		7 (Note: Appearances in the UEFA Champions League)	0	44	5
Sevilla	2018–19	La Liga	34	3	5	0	—		13 (Note: Twelve Appearances in the UEFA Europa League and One Appearance in the Supercopa de España)	3	52	6
Sevilla	2019–20	La Liga	31	3	1	1	—		10 (Note: Appearances in the UEFA Europa League)	2	42	6
Sevilla	2020–21	La Liga	15	1	2	0	—		5 (Note: Four Appearances in the UEFA Champions League and One Appearance in the UEFA Super Cup)	0	22	1
Sevilla	Total		140	18	15	2	0	0	43	6	198	26
Parma	2021–22	Serie B	34	14	1	0	—		—		35	14
Parma	2022–23	Serie B	36	11	2	0	—		2	0	40	11
Parma	Total		70	25	3	0	0	0	2	0	75	25
Cremonese	2023–24	Serie B	35	3	2	1	—		4	1	41	5
Cremonese	2024–25	Serie B	27	9	2	0	—		4	0	33	8
Cremonese	2025–26	Serie A	1	1	1	0	—		–		2	1
Cremonese	Total		63	13	5	1	0	0	8	1	76	14
Career totals			486	94	28	3	0	0	57	7	571	103

=== International ===
As of 16 June 2019

Appearances and goals by national team and year
National team	Year	Apps	Goals
Italy	2015	2	0
Total		2	0
Argentina	2018	3	0
Total		3	0

== Honours ==
Palermo

- Serie B: 2013–14

Sevilla

- UEFA Europa League: 2019–20

Belgrano

- Primera División: 2026 Apertura

Individual

- Serie A Top Assist Provider: 2014–15
