= Isaac N'Tow =

Ghanaian footballer

Isaac Ntow
Personal information
- Full name: Isaac Toah Ntow
- Date of birth: 26 May 1994 (age 32)
- Place of birth: Ghana
- Height: 1.74 m (5 ft 9 in)
- Position: Winger

Youth career
- 2010–2013: Inter Milan
- 2013: Brescia

Senior career*
Years	Team	Apps	(Gls)
2013–2015	Brescia	5	(0)
2015–2016	Chievo	0	(0)
2015–2016	→ Como (loan)	3	(0)
2016	→ Renate (loan)	10	(0)
2016–2017	Sambenedettese	14	(0)
2017–2018	Ciliverghe Mazzano	17	(0)
2018	Franciacorta FC		
2018–2019	Hibernians	18	(0)
2019–2021	Birkirkara	25	(2)
2021–2022	Ħamrun Spartans	18	(1)
- * Club domestic league appearances and goals as of 7 May 2022

Isaac Toah N'Tow (born 26 May 1994) is a Ghanaian professional footballer who plays as a winger.

== Club career ==
Ntow started his youth career at Inter Milan, being promoted to Primavera side in July 2010. On 31 January 2013 he moved to Brescia in a co-ownership deal for a peppercorn fee. Ntow picked no.14 shirt. On 20 June 2013 the remain 50% registration rights of Ntow was given to Brescia for free.

On 15 March 2014 Ntow played his first match as a professional, coming on as a second-half substitute in a 0–2 loss at Palermo.

In summer 2015 he was signed by Chievo on a free transfer. On 21 August he was farmed to Serie B club Como. In January 2016 Ntow was loaned to Lega Pro side Renate.

On 19 July 2016 Ntow was signed by Sambenedettese.
