= Achraf Lazaar =

Moroccan footballer

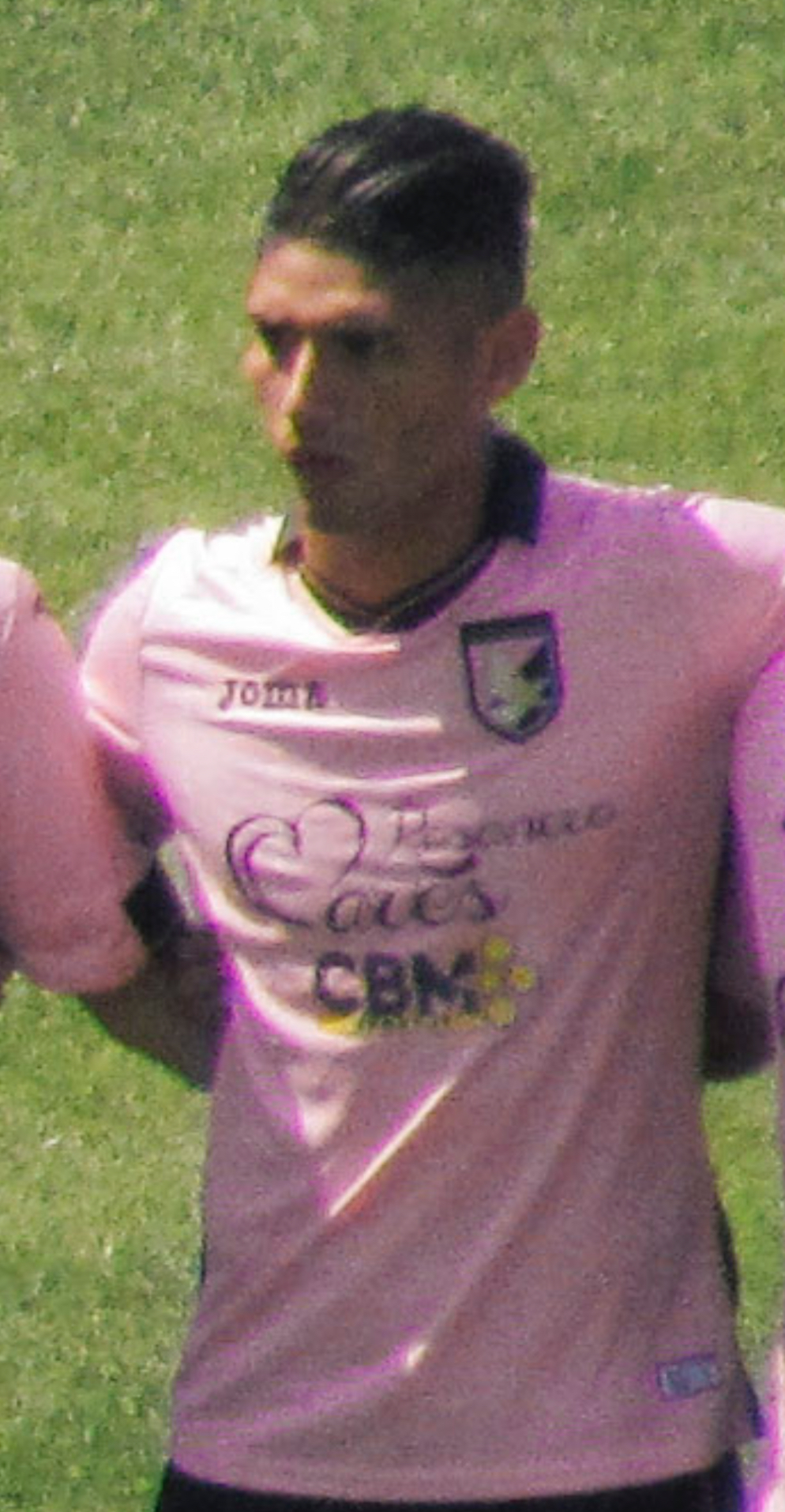

Personal information
- Date of birth: 22 January 1992 (age 34)
- Place of birth: Casablanca, Morocco
- Height: 1.84 m (6 ft 0 in)
- Position: Left back

Youth career
- Raja Casablanca
- 2009–2012: Varese

Senior career*
Years	Team	Apps	(Gls)
2012–2014	Varese	37	(0)
2014–2016	Palermo	66	(3)
2016–2021	Newcastle United	4	(0)
2017–2018	→ Benevento (loan)	9	(1)
2019	→ Sheffield Wednesday (loan)	4	(0)
2019–2020	→ Cosenza (loan)	9	(1)
2021	Watford	5	(0)
2021–2022	Portimonense	4	(0)
2023	Novara	6	(0)
2024	Al-Ittifaq		
2024	→ Dubai City (loan)		
2025	Preston Lions	0	(0)

International career
2014–2018	Morocco	19	(0)
- * Club domestic league appearances and goals as of 28 July 2024

Achraf Lazaar (Arabic: أشرف لزعر; born 22 January 1992) is a Moroccan international footballer who last played as a left midfielder or left back for National Premier Leagues Victoria club Preston Lions.

== Club career ==
Born in Casablanca, Lazaar moved to Italy with his parents in 2003. He began his football career with Varese's youth system, at the age of fifteen. He went on to make his senior debut with the team in Serie B, in 2012, immediately emerging as one of the most interesting prospects from the small Lombardian team.

In January 2014, he was signed by top of Serie B Palermo, on loan with the option to make the move permanent by the end of the season. Initially signed as an understudy to the more experienced Fabio Daprelà, Lazaar immediately gained a starting spot thanks to his impressive performances. He was later permanently signed by Palermo and confirmed as part of the club's 2014–15 squad.

On 28 August 2016, Lazaar joined Newcastle United on a five-year deal. He made his debut in a 2–0 win in the EFL Cup against Wolverhampton Wanderers on 20 September 2016. His league debut took place when he came on as a 72nd-minute substitute for Yoan Gouffran against Brentford on 15 October 2016. On 31 August 2017 Lazaar returned to Italy with a loan to Benevento. On 31 January 2019 Lazaar joined Sheffield Wednesday on loan until the end of the season.

On 2 September 2019, he joined Italian Serie B club Cosenza on loan.

On 4 February 2021, Lazaar and Newcastle United mutually agreed to terminate his contract.

On 11 February 2021, Lazaar signed for Watford on a deal until the end of the season, with an option to extend a further year. He left Watford at the end of the 2020–21 season following the expiration of his contract. Following his release from Watford, Lazaar went on trial with Reading in July 2021.

On 26 August 2021, he joined Portimonense in Portugal on a two-year contract.

On 2 February 2023, he signed for Serie C club Novara until the end of the 2022–23 season.

== International career ==
Having been born in Morocco, Lazaar is eligible to play for Morocco by birth, but until 2015 was ineligible to play for Italy despite having been raised there. He holds Italian citizenship since April 2015. He had originally never stated a clear preference to represent Morocco or Italy, instead declaring he would play for the first international team that showed a genuine interest in calling him up. His impressive Serie B performances with Palermo brought interest from the Moroccan national team, who called him up for a friendly match against Mozambique on 23 May 2014 and ended in a 4–0 win, during which he made his first senior international appearance.

== Career statistics ==
As of match played 8 May 2021

Appearances and goals by club, season and competition
Club	Season	League			Cup		League Cup		Other		Total	
Club	Season	Division	Apps	Goals	Apps	Goals	Apps	Goals	Apps	Goals	Apps	Goals
Varese	2012–13	Serie B	20	0	2	1	—		—		22	1
Varese	2013–14	Serie B	17	0	3	0	—		—		20	0
Varese	Total		37	0	5	1	—		—		42	1
Palermo	2013–14	Serie B	14	0	0	0	—		—		14	0
Palermo	2014–15	Serie A	29	2	1	0	—		—		30	2
Palermo	2015–16	Serie A	30	1	1	0	—		—		31	1
Palermo	2016–17	Serie A	0	0	1	0	—		—		1	0
Palermo	Total		73	3	3	0	—		—		76	3
Newcastle United	2016–17	Championship	4	0	3	0	2	0	—		9	0
Newcastle United	2017–18	Premier League	0	0	1	0	0	0	—		1	0
Newcastle United	2020–21	Premier League	0	0	0	0	0	0	—		0	0
Newcastle United	Total		4	0	4	0	2	0	0	0	10	0
Newcastle United U21	2020–21	—	—		—		—		1 (Note: Appearances in EFL Trophy)	0	1	0
Benevento (loan)	2017–18	Serie A	9	1	—		—		—		9	1
Sheffield Wednesday (loan)	2018–19	Championship	4	0	0	0	0	0	—		4	0
Cosenza (loan)	2019–20	Serie B	9	1	0	0	—		—		9	1
Watford	2020–21	Championship	5	0	0	0	0	0	—		5	0
Career total			141	5	12	1	2	0	1	0	156	6
