= Danilo Ortiz =

Paraguayan footballer (born 1992)

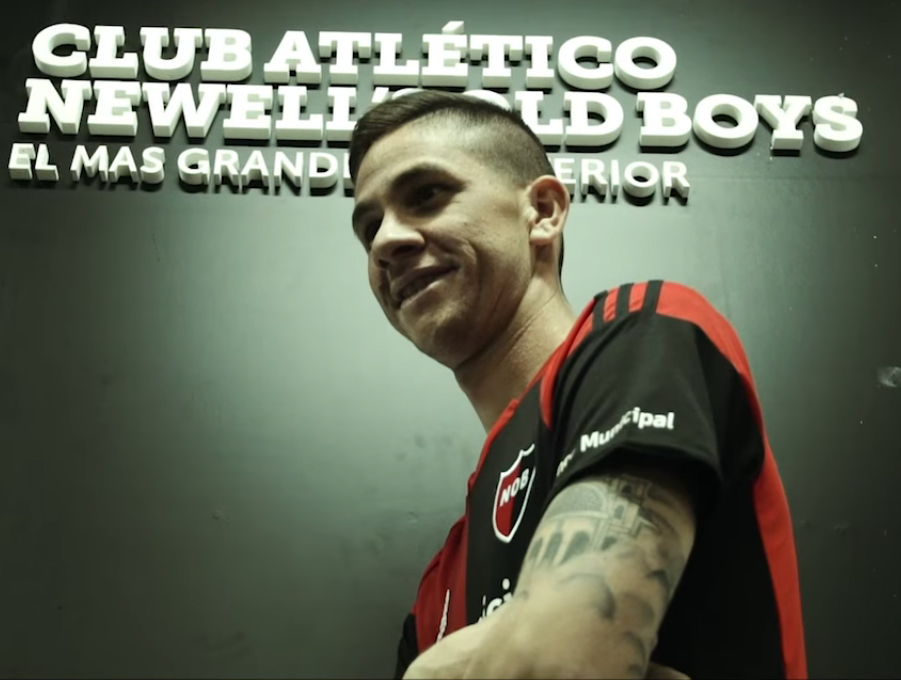
- Ortiz with Newell's Old Boys in 2017

Personal information
- Full name: Danilo Fabián Ortiz Soto
- Date of birth: 28 July 1992 (age 34)
- Place of birth: Asunción, Paraguay
- Height: 1.88 m (6 ft 2 in)
- Position: Centre-back

Team information
- Current team: Deportivo Pereira
- Number: 4

Youth career
- Cerro Porteño

Senior career*
Years	Team	Apps	(Gls)
2011–2017	Cerro Porteño	63	(0)
2015	→ Palermo (loan)	0	(0)
2015–2016	→ Godoy Cruz (loan)	20	(0)
2016–2017	→ Racing Club (loan)	5	(0)
2017–2020	Godoy Cruz	10	(0)
2017	→ Newell's Old Boys (loan)	0	(0)
2018	→ Banfield (loan)	19	(1)
2019	→ Libertad (loan)	2	(0)
2019	→ Dorados de Sinaloa (loan)	0	(0)
2019–2020	→ Elche (loan)	5	(1)
2021	Sol de América	10	(0)
2021–2022	12 de Octubre	48	(1)
2023	Deportes La Serena	29	(1)
2024	Santiago Wanderers	20	(0)
2025	Cienciano	15	(3)
2026–	Deportivo Pereira	1	(0)

International career
2014	Paraguay	3	(0)
- * Club domestic league appearances and goals as of 30 December 2025

Danilo Fabián Ortiz Soto (born 28 July 1992) is a Paraguayan footballer who plays as a centre-back for Categoría Primera A club Deportivo Pereira.

== Career ==
In August 2019 he was loaned to Spanish club Elche CF by the recommendation of Christian Bragarnik. On 24 December 2019 Elche CF rescinded the contract with him and Ortiz returned to Godoy Cruz.

In 2023, he moved to Chile and signed with Deportes La Serena in the second level. The next season, he switched to Santiago Wanderers.
