= Michel Morganella =

Swiss footballer (born 1989)

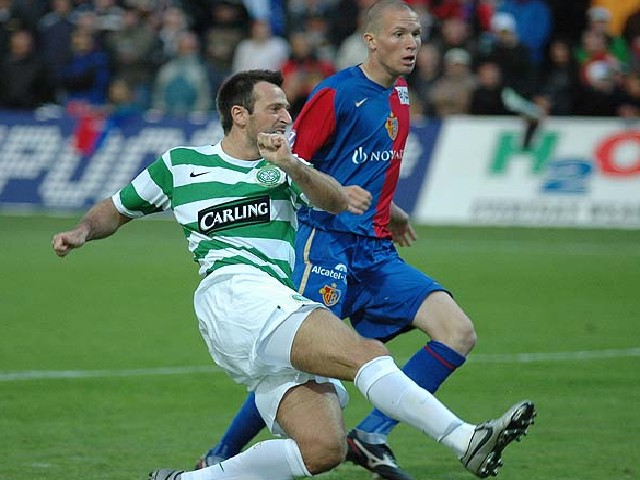
- Morganella behind Celtic forward Maciej Żurawski

Personal information
- Date of birth: 17 May 1989 (age 37)
- Place of birth: Sierre, Switzerland
- Height: 1.84 m (6 ft 0 in)
- Position: Right back

Team information
- Current team: Chiasso
- Number: 89

Youth career
- FC Chippis
- –2004: Sion
- 2004–2006: Basel

Senior career*
Years	Team	Apps	(Gls)
2006–2009	Basel U-21	30	(1)
2007–2009	Basel	6	(0)
2009–2011	Palermo	2	(0)
2010–2011	→ Novara (loan)	20	(0)
2011–2012	Novara	42	(0)
2012–2018	Palermo	101	(2)
2018–2019	Rapperswil-Jona	6	(0)
2019	Padova	12	(1)
2019–2020	Livorno	11	(0)
2020–	Chiasso	31	(2)

International career
2005–2006	Switzerland U17	12	(3)
2007–2008	Switzerland U19	9	(0)
2009–2011	Switzerland U21	3	(0)
2012	Switzerland Olympic	3	(0)
2012–2013	Switzerland	2	(0)
- * Club domestic league appearances and goals as of 30 June 2023

Michel Morganella (born 17 May 1989) is a Swiss-Italian professional footballer who plays as a defender for Chiasso.

== Football career ==
=== Club ===
Youth

Born to an Italian father and a Swiss mother, Morganella grew up in Chippis, on the boarder to Sierre. Morganella started his youth football with local amateur club FC Chippis. After a few years he moved to the youth department of Sion and in August 2004 he moved to the youth department of FC Basel. He played in their U-18 team during the 2005–06 season, under coach Patrick Rahmen and his assistant Marco Walker and with them won both the Swiss U-18 championship and the U-19/18 national cup that season. Thereafter, in summer 2006 he advanced to join their U-21 team and played as a right-back or a wide-right midfielder.

Basel

In the winter break of their 2006–07 season he was brought up to the first team by head coach Christian Gross. After playing in four test games Morganella played his domestic league debut for the club in the away game in the Stade Tourbillon on 25 February 2007, coming on as substitute in the 79th minute, as Basel played a goalless draw with Sion. He played two further games that season, both over the full 90 minutes. The following season Basel played in the 2007–08 UEFA Cup and in the last match of the group stage, as they played in the HSH Nordbank Arena on 20 December 2007, Morganella came on as substitute replacing David Degen in the 50th minute, after fellow right back Reto Zanni had been shown the second yellow card and been dismissed. The game against Hamburger SV ended with a 1–1 draw. At the end of their 2007–08 season Morganella won the Double with the club. They won the league championship title with four points advantage over second placed Young Boys. In the Swiss Cup Basel advanced to the final, and winning this 4–1 against AC Bellinzona they won the competition.

In the first half of their 2008–09 season Morganella had just two league appearances and one in the Swiss Cup 2008–09. Nevertheless, the club offered Morganella a new contract, to freshen up his expiring deal. On 2 November 2008 they signed a three-year contract which was intended to keep him at St. Jakob-Park until summer 2011. On 9 December Morganella played his Champions League debut in the last matchday of the group stage. He played the full 90 minutes, but Basel were defeated 1–0 by Sporting CP.

Following days of speculation about his future, Basel announced, on 30 January 2009, that Morganella had left the club. During his time with the club, Morganella played a total of 36 games for Basel's first team, but without scoring a goal. Six of these games were in the Swiss Super League, one in the Swiss Cup, two in the UEFA competitions (Champions League and UEFA Cup) and 27 were friendly games.

Palermo

The same day, Palermo officially announced to have signed Morganella on a four-year and a half contract, He thus became the first Swiss footballer to play for the rosanero.

During his early times at Palermo, Morganella never broke into the first team and after about 18 months he was eventually loaned out to Serie B club Novara in July 2010.

Novara

On 31 January 2011, Palermo announced to have sold 50% of Morganella's transfer rights to Novara along with Samir Ujkani (both tagged for €1.5 million), as part of a bid involving striker Pablo Andrés González for €5 million. He concluded the season with a historic promotion to Serie A.

Palermo

On 22 June 2012, Palermo announced on their website that they had re-acquired the full transfer rights of Morganella and fellow Novara player Ujkani. Morganella returned and then played regularly for Palermo. Morganella's contract expired on 30 June 2018 and he was without an employer.

Rapperswil-Jona

On 26 October 2018, Morganella returned to Switzerland, signing a two-year (semi-professional) contract with Rapperswil-Jona. Returning to competition football, Morganella played 7 games up until the end of calendar year 2018.

Padova

On 15 January 2019, Morganella signed with Italian Serie B club Padova.

Livorno

On 10 July 2019, Morganella signed with Livorno.

=== International ===
Morganella represented Switzerland at various youth levels. He was chosen by Pierluigi Tami for the London 2012 Olympics national squad. In advance of the Olympics, Morganella debuted with the senior Swiss national football team on 30 May 2012, replacing Reto Ziegler in the friendly against Romania.

On 30 July 2012, following the Swiss team's defeat against South Korea, the Swiss Olympic Committee expelled Morganella from the games after he posted on Twitter a message translating to "I am going to batter the Koreans, burn them all... bunch of Mongoloids." Morganella later apologized.

== Honours ==
Basel

- Swiss Championship at U-18 level: 2005–06
- Swiss Cup Winner at U-19/18 level: 2005–06
- Swiss Super League: 2007–08
- Swiss Cup: 2008

Palermo

- Serie B champions: 2013–14
