= Francesco Bolzoni =

Italian footballer (born 1989)

Personal information
- Date of birth: 7 May 1989 (age 37)
- Place of birth: Lodi, Italy
- Height: 1.83 m (6 ft 0 in)
- Position: Midfielder

Team information
- Current team: Pro Patria (head coach)

Youth career
- Inter

Senior career*
Years	Team	Apps	(Gls)
2008–2009	Inter	1	(0)
2009–2010	Genoa	0	(0)
2009–2010	→ Frosinone (loan)	25	(0)
2010–2013	Siena	67	(4)
2013–2016	Palermo	60	(4)
2016–2017	Novara	15	(0)
2017–2018	Spezia	29	(0)
2018–2022	Bari	31	(1)
2019–2020	→ Imolese (loan)	8	(0)
2020–2021	→ Lecco (loan)	35	(0)
2022	Team Ticino	13	(0)
2022–2023	Rapperswil-Jona	17	(1)

International career
2005–2006	Italy U17	8	(0)
2007	Italy U20	1	(0)
2007–2010	Italy U21	14	(0)

Managerial career
- 2025–: Pro Patria
- * Club domestic league appearances and goals

Francesco Bolzoni (born 7 May 1989) is an Italian football coach and former footballer who played as a midfielder, currently in charge as head coach of Serie D club Pro Patria.

He is a former Italy U21 international.

== Playing career ==
=== Internazionale ===
Bolzoni started at San Colombano al Lambro before joining Inter's academy. Bolzoni has played for every academy team from the Esordienti (under-13) to the Primavera (under-20).

During the 2006–2007 season, Bolzoni was part of the winning side, as the reserve team won the Campionato Nazionale Primavera (under-20 Italian Championship).

He made his first-team debut on 1 February 2007, playing 26 minutes of 2006–07 Coppa Italia) semi-final return leg against Sampdoria at the Stadio Giuseppe Meazza.

On 19 September 2007, Bolzoni, along with Esposito and Puccio, was selected for the first time in the 20-man squad for the 2006–07 UEFA Champions League match against Fenerbahçe. However, he failed to make his UEFA Champions League debut that day. In the following match against PSV Eindhoven, he came on as a substitute for Santiago Solari in the 70th minute, making his first UEFA Champions League appearance.

On 12 December, during an away match against PSV Eindhoven, Bolzoni started his first UEFA Champions League match and also played the whole 90 minutes. The game ended in a 1–0 win for Internazionale.

In 2008, Bolzoni renewed his contract with the club until 30 June 2012.

On 24 May 2009, in a match against Cagliari, he made his Serie A debut for Inter, coming in as a substitute for Cristian Chivu.

=== Genoa ===
In July 2009, it was announced that Bolzoni had signed for Genoa along with Leonardo Bonucci for €3M each as part of the deal that saw Thiago Motta sign for Internazionale for €10 million.

In August 2009, he was loaned to Frosinone for €200,000.

=== Siena ===
In July 2010, Siena signed Bolzoni on loan for €400,000 with an option to acquire 50% of his economic rights, fact that occurred on 22 June 2011, for €1,050,000. On 23 June 2012 Siena bought him outright for another €425,000.

=== Palermo ===
On 31 July 2013, Bolzoni left Siena's pre-season camp and completed the transfer to Palermo on the next day, for €1 million in a 4-year contract.

=== Novara ===
On 1 February 2016, he was signed by Novara on a free transfer.

=== Spezia ===
On 31 August 2017, Bolzoni joined fellow Serie B club Spezia, while Daniele Sciaudone moved in the opposite direction. Bolzoni was assigned number 7 shirt.

=== Bari ===
In September 2018, Bolzoni joined newly refounded Serie D club Bari as a free transfer.

==== Loan to Imolese ====
On 2 September 2019, he joined Serie C club Imolese on loan.

==== Loan to Lecco ====
On 15 January 2020 he moved to Lecco. The loan was extended for the 2020–21 season on 1 September 2020.

==== Return to Bari ====
Upon his return from loan, Bolzoni did not make any appearances for Bari in the first half of the 2021–22 season, and on 26 January 2022, his contract with the club was terminated by mutual consent.

=== Rapperswil-Jona ===
On 28 July 2022, Bolzoni signed with Rapperswil-Jona in the third-tier Swiss Promotion League.

== International career ==
On 5 October 2007, Pierluigi Casiraghi called up Bolzoni, although still 18 years old, to form part of the Italy U-21 national team for the matches against Croatia and Greece.

On 21 November 2007, he made his debut for the Italy U-21 national team, in a qualification match against Faroe Islands but did not make the final 23-man squad for the tournament.

== Management career ==
In May 2023, Bolzoni announced his retirement from football due to a persistent knee injury. After retiring, Bolzoni was hired as assistant coach under Giuseppe Sannino at FC Paradiso.

In July 2024, Bolzoni took over as a youth coach at Pro Patria, in charge of the Under-19 team. On 11 December 2025, Pro Patria promoted him to head coach, following the dismissal of Leandro Greco.

== Honours ==
Inter Youth team

- Campionato Nazionale Primavera (Under-20 Italian Championship): 2006–07
- Torneo di Viareggio: 2008
