= Derby delle Due Sicilie =

Association football rivalry in Italy

- Teams: Napoli; Palermo
- First meeting: Palermo Napoli; Coppa Pirandello (1928)
- Latest meeting: Napoli 5–0 Palermo; Coppa Italia (26 September 2024)
- Stadiums: Stadio San Paolo (Napoli); Stadio Renzo Barbera (Palermo)

Statistics
- Total meetings: 56
- Most wins: Napoli (26)
- All-time series: Napoli: 26; Drawn: 18; Palermo: 12
- Largest victory: Napoli 6–0 Palermo; 1934–35 Serie A (2 December 1934)

The Derby delle Due Sicilie ("Derby of the Two Sicilies") is an Italian Serie A derby between the Napoli and Palermo football clubs.

It represents the football challenge between the two historical capitals of the Two Sicilies.

The first match was played in 1928. In that year, Giuseppe Pirandello, defender and ex-skipper of Palermo, died while he was under contract with Napoli. The Palermitan newspaper L’Ora organized a friendly competition, the Coppa Pirandello, in memory of the player. Napoli won the match, although the score is unknown.

== Statistics ==
| Competition | Played | Napoli wins | Draws | Palermo wins | Napoli goals | Palermo goals |
|---|---|---|---|---|---|---|
| Serie A | 48 | 24 | 15 | 9 | 78 | 33 |
| Serie B | 6 | 1 | 3 | 2 | 6 | 10 |
| Coppa Italia | 2 | 1 | 0 | 1 | 5 | 3 |
| Total | 56 | 26 | 18 | 12 | 89 | 46 |

Source: worldfootball.net
