= Roberto Vitiello =

Italian professional football coach and former player

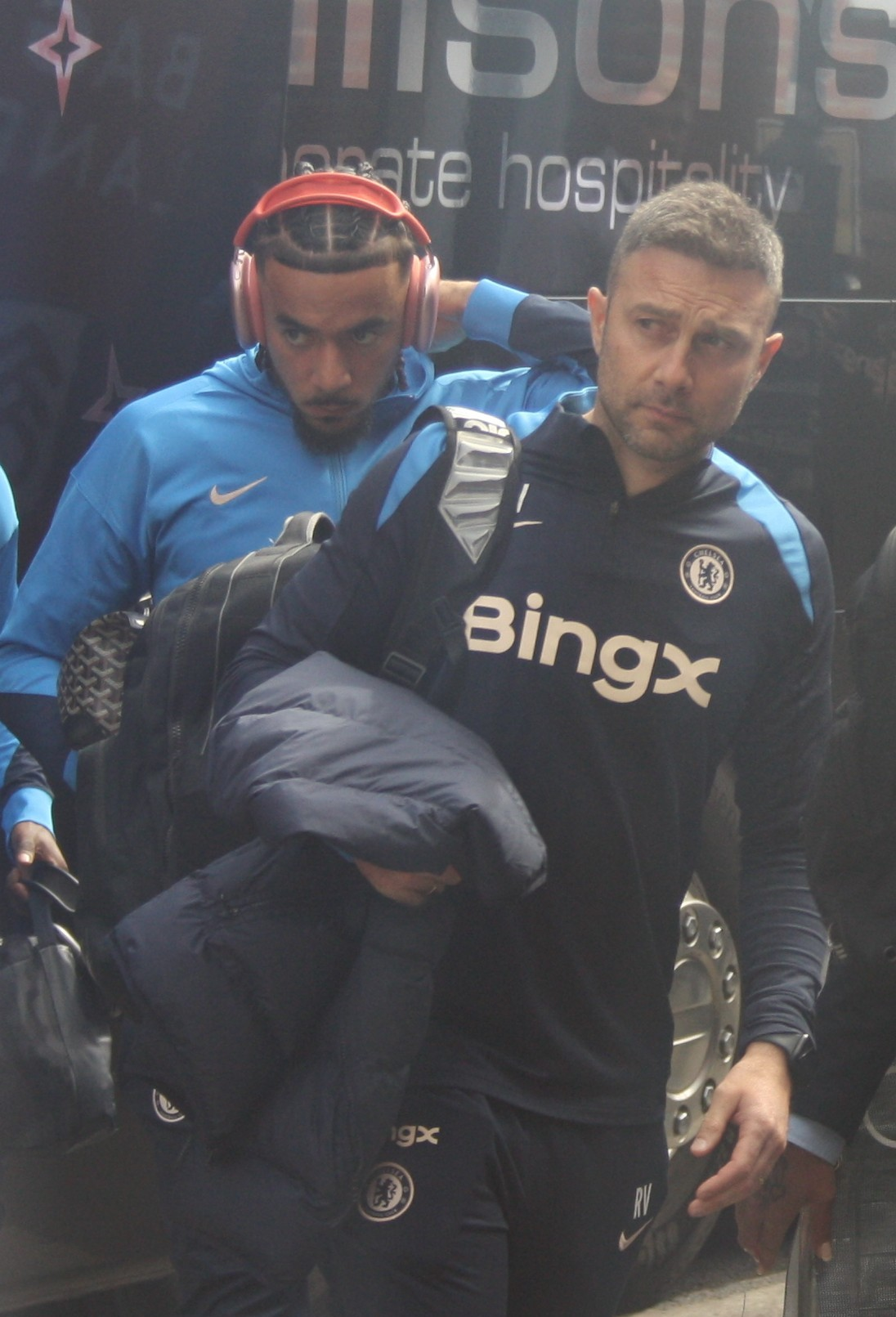
- Vitiello in 2025.

Personal information
- Full name: Roberto Vitiello
- Date of birth: 8 May 1983 (age 43)
- Place of birth: Scafati, Italy
- Height: 1.76 m (5 ft 9 in)
- Positions: Right-back; centre-back

Team information
- Current team: Manchester City (assistant)

Youth career
- –2002: Parma

Senior career*
Years	Team	Apps	(Gls)
2002–2004	Parma	0	(0)
2002–2003	→ Cesena (loan)	29	(1)
2003–2004	→ Vicenza (loan)	34	(0)
2004–2006	Vicenza	73	(10)
2006–2010	Rimini	128	(6)
2010–2014	Siena	72	(1)
2014–2017	Palermo	43	(1)
2017–2018	Ternana	27	(0)
2018–2020	Juve Stabia	62	(2)
Total		468	(21)

International career
2004	Italy U20	3	(0)
- * Club domestic league appearances and goals as of 31 July 2020

Roberto Vitiello (born 8 May 1983) is an Italian professional football coach and former player who is assistant manager for Premier League club Manchester City.

== Career ==
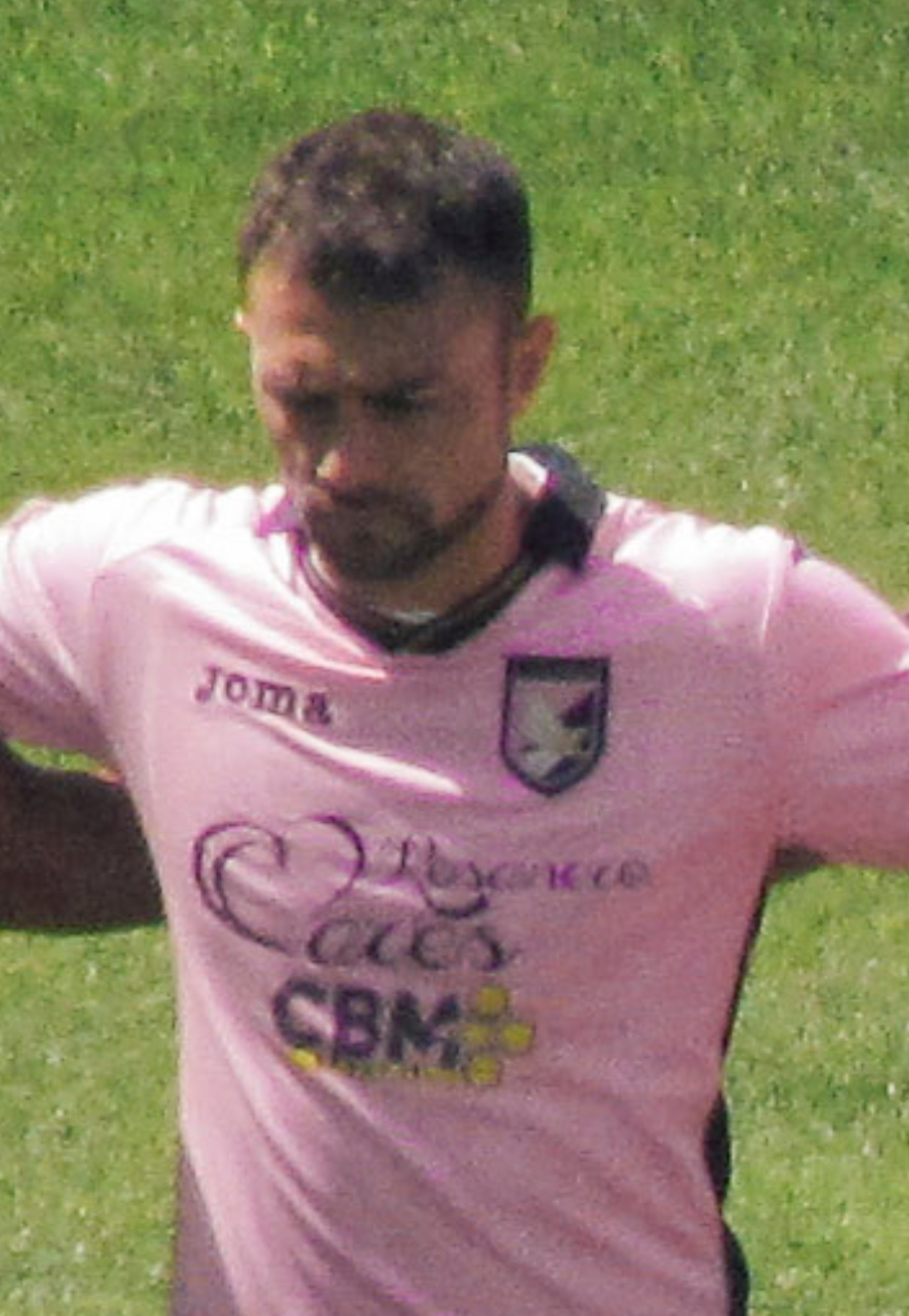
Vitiello playing for Palermo in 2015.

Vitiello started his career at Parma. A highly rated youth player, he was part of the youth side that competed at the 2002 Torneo di Viareggio. Upon joining the first team, he was given the number 34 jersey.

After a loan spell in Serie C1 with Cesena, Vitiello was loaned to Vicenza of Serie B in July 2003, as compensation for Giuseppe Cardone and Christian Maggio. In summer 2004 the deal became permanent. He was sold to Rimini, also of Serie B, in July 2006.

In June 2010, Vitiello signed a three-year contract with newly relegated Serie B team Siena.

Vitiello moved to Serie A side Palermo in January 2014. His contract expired at the end of the 2016–17 season, which ended with Palermo being relegated to Serie B, and was subsequently not renewed.

In August 2017 Vitiello signed a 1-year contract with Serie B team Ternana.

Vitiello joined Lega Pro side Juve Stabia in August 2018, signing a 2-year contract.
