= Fabio Daprelà =

Swiss footballer (born 1991)

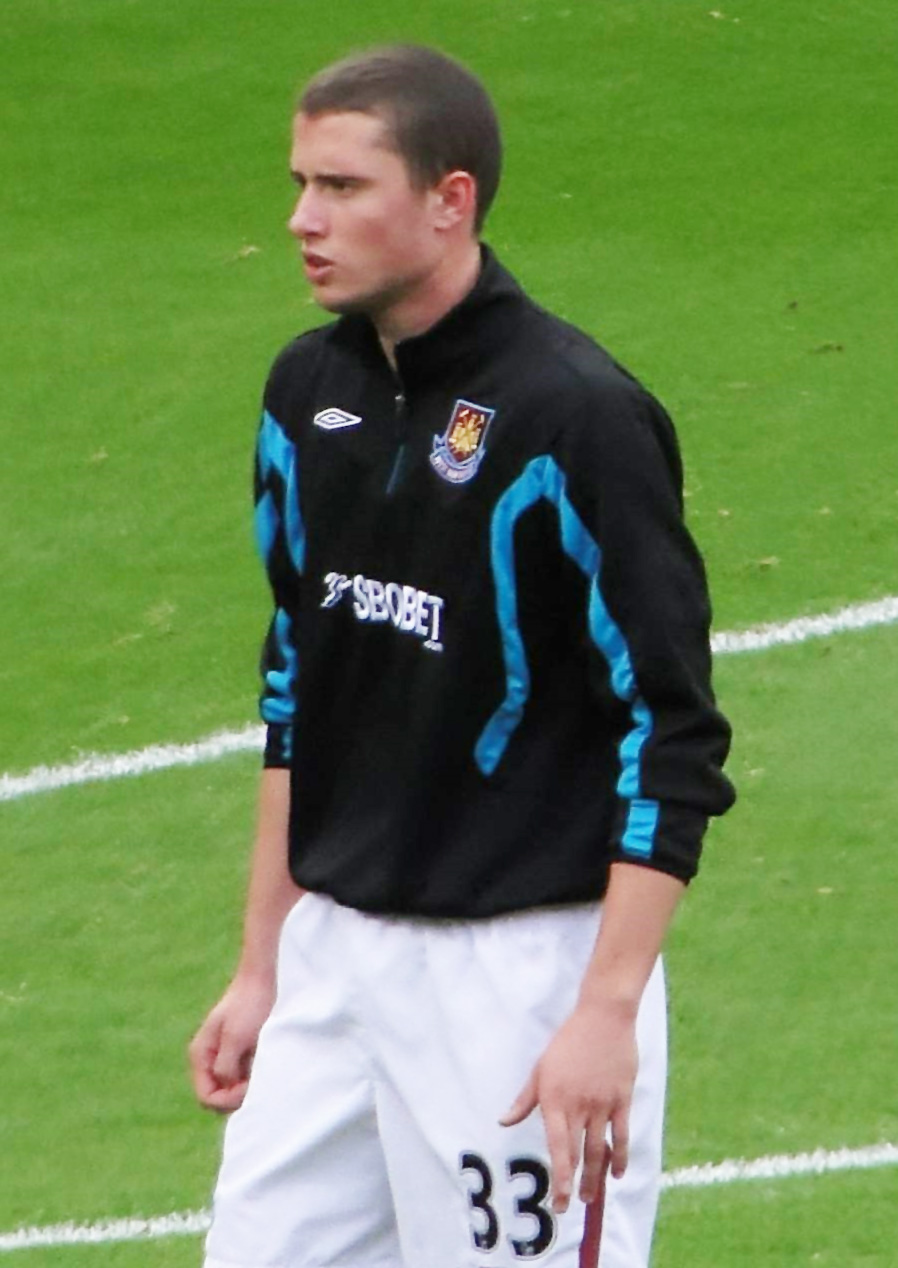
- Daprelà at West Ham, October 2009.

Personal information
- Date of birth: 19 February 1991 (age 35)
- Place of birth: Zürich, Switzerland
- Height: 1.80 m (5 ft 11 in)
- Positions: Left back; winger

Youth career
- 2000–2003: YF Juventus
- 2003–2007: Grasshopper

Senior career*
Years	Team	Apps	(Gls)
2007–2009	Grasshopper	28	(0)
2009–2010	West Ham United	7	(0)
2010–2013	Brescia	78	(5)
2013–2015	Palermo	52	(0)
2016	Carpi	7	(0)
2016–2017	Chievo Verona	0	(0)
2016–2017	→ Bari (loan)	27	(2)
2017–2023	Lugano	156	(5)
2023–2024	Zürich	25	(0)

International career^{‡}
2007–2008	Switzerland U17	15	(6)
2008–2010	Switzerland U19	12	(2)
2010–2011	Switzerland U21	18	(0)
2012	Switzerland Olympic	2	(0)
- * Club domestic league appearances and goals as of 1 September 2024 ‡ National team caps and goals as of 16:08, 14 November 2012 (UTC)

Fabio Daprelà (Italian pronunciation: [ˈfaːbjo dapreˈla]; born 19 February 1991) is a Swiss footballer who plays as a defender. He is a former Switzerland U21 international.

== Club career ==
=== Early career ===
Daprelà was eight when he was spotted by SC Young Fellows Juventus and signed for them. After three years at SC Young Fellows Juventus, Daprelà joined Grasshoppers at the age of 12. Aged 16, Daprelà was promoted to first team squad and made his Grasshoppers debut on 2 February 2008, playing 90 minutes in place of the suspended Yassin Mikari. In the Swiss Cup, Daprelà scored his first goal for Grasshopper in a 2–2 draw against FC Chiasso on 26 October 2008.

=== West Ham United ===
In July 2009, Daprelà signed for West Ham United from Grasshoppers for a nominal fee joining fellow Swiss international, Valon Behrami who had been signed from Lazio in the summer of 2008. Daprelà signed a five-year deal after moving from the Zurich club and arrived as cover for first choice Hérita Ilunga. Replacing the injured Ilunga, Daprelà made his first-team debut for West Ham on 3 January 2010 in their 2–1 home defeat to Arsenal in the FA Cup third round. The highly rated Switzerland Under-19 left-back had worn the armband for Alex Dyer's reserves team. On 13 March 2010 Daprelà made his Premier League debut in a 4–1 away defeat to Chelsea. Daprelà made eight appearances in all competitions for West Ham United, leaving at the end of the 2009–10 season. Following the sacking of manager Gianfranco Zola's, who signed him, West Ham United's new manager Avram Grant rarely used Daprelà in the first team.

=== Brescia ===
On 30 August 2010 Daprelà joined Brescia for an undisclosed fee signing a five-year contract and joining up with Swiss teammate Gaetano Berardi. On 26 September 2011, Daprelà made his debut for Brescia in a 2–1 loss against A.S. Bari. In his first season at Brescia, Daprelà made ten appearances (coming on as substitute five times) but his team played poorly and were relegated to Serie B after just one season in Serie A. Following Brescia's relegation Daprelà stayed, while some of the club's key players left. His first season at Brescia was mixed for Daprelà.

The next season at Brescia was key for Daprelà as he established himself in the first team at full back as the club placed 8th place.

=== Palermo ===
On 29 July 2013 he moved to Palermo, signing a three-year contract (with an option for another year). In the 2013–14 season, Daprelà was part of the Palermo side winning the Serie B title, thereby earning promotion back to the Serie A.

=== Carpi ===
On 6 January 2016 Carpi have announced the signing of Daprela after he left Palermo by mutual consent. He is tied to the Biancorossi until 30 June 2016 and given the number 36 shirt.

=== Zürich ===
On 7 June 2023, Daprelà signed a two-season contract with Zürich. On 9 September 2024, his contract with Zürich was terminated by mutual consent.

== International career ==
A regular in the U-17's, Daprelà played every minute of Switzerland's campaign at the 2008 European Championships, starting each match at left back. After the tournament, he was promoted to the U-19's and played in every game at the 2009 European Championships despite not taking part in qualification.

Participated at the 2011 UEFA European Under-21 Football Championship, finishing second in the competition, losing the final against Spain.

He was chosen by Pierluigi Tami for the London 2012 Olympics national squad.

== Honours ==
=== Club ===
Palermo

- Serie B: 2013–14

Lugano

- Swiss Cup: 2021–22

=== International ===
Swiss Olympic team

- Represented Switzerland at the 2012 Summer Olympics

Switzerland Under-21

- UEFA European Under-21 Football Championship: Runner Up 2011
