= 2018–19 Coppa Italia =

Tournament details
- Country: Italy
- Dates: 28 July 2018 – 15 May 2019
- Teams: 78

Final positions
- Champions: Lazio (7th title)
- Runners-up: Atalanta

Tournament statistics
- Matches played: 79
- Goals scored: 218 (2.76 per match)
- Top goal scorer(s): Krzysztof Piątek (8 goals)

The 2018–19 Coppa Italia, also known as TIM Cup for sponsorship reasons, was the 72nd edition of the national domestic tournament.

Juventus were the four-time defending champions, but were eliminated by Atalanta in the quarter-finals.

Lazio won the competition by defeating Atalanta 2–0 in the final, winning their seventh cup title.

== Participating teams ==
=== Serie A (20 teams) ===
- Atalanta
- Bologna
- Cagliari
- Chievo
- Empoli
- Fiorentina
- Frosinone
- Genoa
- Internazionale
- Juventus
- Lazio
- Milan
- Napoli
- Parma
- Roma
- Sampdoria
- Sassuolo
- SPAL
- Torino
- Udinese

=== Serie B (19 teams) ===
- Ascoli
- Benevento
- Brescia
- Carpi
- Cittadella
- Cosenza
- Cremonese
- Crotone
- Foggia
- Hellas Verona
- Lecce
- Livorno
- Padova
- Palermo
- Perugia
- Pescara
- Salernitana
- Spezia
- Venezia

=== Serie C (30 teams) ===
- AlbinoLeffe
- Alessandria
- Carrarese
- Casertana
- Catania
- FeralpiSalò
- Giana Erminio
- Juve Stabia
- Monopoli
- Monza
- Novara
- Piacenza
- Pisa
- Pistoiese
- Pontedera
- Pordenone
- Pro Vercelli
- Renate
- Rende
- Sambenedettese
- Sicula Leonzio
- Siena
- Südtirol
- Ternana
- Trapani
- Triestina
- Vicenza Virtus
- Virtus Entella
- Virtus Francavilla
- Viterbese

=== Serie D (9 teams) ===
- Albalonga
- Campodarsego
- Chieri
- Como
- Imolese
- Matelica
- Picerno
- Rezzato
- Unione Sanremo

== Format and seeding ==
Teams entered the competition at various stages, as follows:

- First phase (one-legged fixtures)
  - First round: 27 teams from Serie C and the nine Serie D teams started the tournament
  - Second round: the eighteen winners from the previous round were joined by the nineteen Serie B teams and three teams from Serie C
  - Third round: the twenty winners from the second round met the twelve Serie A sides seeded 9–20
  - Fourth round: the sixteen winners faced each other
- Second phase
  - Round of 16 (one-legged): the eight fourth round winners were inserted into a bracket with the Serie A clubs seeded 1–8
  - Quarter-finals (one-legged)
  - Semi-finals (two-legged)
- Final (one-legged)

== Round dates ==
The schedule of each round was as follows:

Phase	Round	First leg	Second leg
First stage	First round	29 July 2018	
First stage	Second round	5 August 2018	
First stage	Third round	12 August 2018	
First stage	Fourth round	5 December 2018	
Final stage	Round of 16	13 January 2019	
Final stage	Quarter-finals	30 January 2019	
Final stage	Semi-finals	27 February 2019	24 April 2019
Final stage	Final	15 May 2019	

== First stage ==
=== First round ===
A total of 36 teams from Serie C and Serie D competed in this round, eighteen of which advanced to second round. The first round matches were played on 28 and 29 July 2018.

28 July 2018	Casertana (3)	2–0	AZ Picerno (4)	Caserta
20:30 CEST	Alfageme 23', 90+2'	Report		Stadium: Stadio Alberto Pinto

29 July 2018	Viterbese (3)	1–0	Rende (3)	Viterbo
18:00 CEST	Palermo 58'	Report		Stadium: Stadio Enrico Rocchi

29 July 2018	Sambenedettese (3)	1–0	Unione Sanremo (4)	San Benedetto del Tronto
18:30 CEST	Gelonese 47'	Report		Stadium: Stadio Riviera delle Palme

29 July 2018	Ternana (3)	1–1 (a.e.t.) (4–2 p)	Pontedera (3)	Terni
20:30 CEST	Vantaggiato 28' (pen.)	Report	Vigna 14'	Stadium: Stadio Libero Liberati
	Penalties
	López (penalty scored); Vantaggiato (penalty scored); Defendi (penalty scored); D. Altobelli (penalty scored)		(penalty scored) Mannini; (penalty missed) Gargiulio; (penalty scored) Borri; (penalty missed) Tommasini

29 July 2018	Catania (3)	3–0	Como (4)	Catania
20:30 CEST	Lodi 29'; Rossetti 45'; Curiale 75'	Report		Stadium: Stadio Angelo Massimino

29 July 2018	Juve Stabia (3)	1–0	Pistoiese (3)	Castellammare di Stabia
20:30 CEST	Paponi 80'	Report		Stadium: Stadio Romeo Menti

29 July 2018	Pisa (3)	2–2 (a.e.t.) (5–3 p)	Triestina (3)	Pisa
20:45 CEST	Moscardelli 60', 96'	Report	Bracaletti 11', 105+3'	Stadium: Stadio Arena Garibaldi - Romeo Anconetani
	Penalties
	Moscardelli (penalty scored); S. Birindelli (penalty scored); Gucher (penalty scored); de Vitis (penalty scored); Mensah (penalty scored)		(penalty scored) Coletti; (penalty scored) Procaccio; (penalty scored) Bracaletti; (penalty missed) Mensah

29 July 2018	Monopoli (3)	1–1 (a.e.t.) (5–3 p)	Piacenza (3)	Monopoli
20:30 CEST	Scoppa 105+1' (pen.)	Report	Sylla 97'	Stadium: Stadio Vito Simone Veneziani
	Penalties
	Scoppa (penalty scored); Donnarumma (penalty scored); de Franco (penalty scored); Sounas (penalty scored); Zampa (penalty scored)		(penalty scored) Porcari; (penalty missed) M. Marotta; (penalty scored) Sylla; (penalty scored) Silva

29 July 2018	Carrarese (3)	0–1	Imolese (4)	Carrara
20:30 CEST		Report	de Marchi 69'	Stadium: Stadio dei Marmi

29 July 2018	Trapani (3)	1–0	Campodarsego (4)	Erice
20:30 CEST	Evacuo 11'	Report		Stadium: Stadio Polisportivo Provinciale

29 July 2018	Südtirol (3)	2–1	Albalonga (4)	Bolzano
17:30 CEST	Constantino 53'; Vinetot 82'	Report	Corsetti 55'	Stadium: Stadio Druso

29 July 2018	FeralpiSalò (3)	2–0	Virtus Francavilla (3)	Salò
20:30 CEST	Marchi 53', 64' (pen.)	Report		Stadium: Stadio Lino Turina

29 July 2018	Siena (3)	2–0	Sicula Leonzio (3)	Siena
20:30 CEST	Bulevardi 48'; Neglia 65' (pen.)	Report		Stadium: Stadio Artemio Franchi

29 July 2018	Renate (3)	0–2	Rezzato (4)	Meda
18:00 CEST		Report	Sodinha 45'; Geroni 54'	Stadium: Stadio Città di Meda

29 July 2018	Monza (3)	1–0	Matelica (4)	Monza
17:00 CEST	Barba 48'	Report		Stadium: Stadio Brianteo

29 July 2018	Alessandria (3)	0–1	Giana Erminio (3)	Alessandria
16:30 CEST		Report	Marzeglia 58'	Stadium: Stadio Giuseppe Moccagatta

29 July 2018	AlbinoLeffe (3)	0–1	Pordenone (3)	Bergamo
18:30 CEST		Report	Bombagi 90+1'	Stadium: Stadio Atleti Azzurri d'Italia

29 July 2018	Vicenza (3)	2–1	Chieri (4)	Vicenza
18:30 CEST	Maistrello 14'; Curcio 35'	Report	Pautassi 29'	Stadium: Stadio Romeo Menti

=== Second round ===
A total of forty teams from Serie B, Serie C and Serie D competed in the second round, twenty of which advanced to join twelve teams from Serie A in the third round. The second round matches were played on 4, 5 and 7 August 2018.

4 August 2018	Ascoli (2)	0–4	Viterbese (3)	Ascoli Piceno
18:00 CEST		Report	Bismark 34'; Zerbin 39'; Vandeputte 71', 84'	Stadium: Stadio Cino e Lillo Del Duca

4 August 2018	Carpi (2)	0–2	Ternana (3)	Pisa
20:30 CEST		Report	Vantaggiato 12'; Rivas 45+1'	Stadium: Stadio Ettore Mannucci
Note: The tie were played in Pisa due indisponibilty of the stadium.

4 August 2018	Spezia (2)	2–1	Sambenedettese (3)	La Spezia
20:30 CEST	Pierini 66'; Bartolomei 81'	Report	Gelonese 77'	Stadium: Stadio Alberto Picco

4 August 2018	Trapani (3)	1–2 (a.e.t.)	Cosenza (2)	Erice
20:30 CEST	Evacuo 63'	Report	di Piazza 58'; Azzinnari 93'	Stadium: Stadio Polisportivo Provinciale
Note: Tie reversed from the original draw.

5 August 2018	Benevento (2)	3–1	Imolese (4)	Benevento
20:00 CEST	R. Insigne 1'; Coda 9'; Improta 28'	Report	Maggio 53' (o.g.)	Stadium: Stadio Ciro Vigorito

5 August 2018	Cittadella (2)	1–0	Monopoli (3)	Cittadella
20:00 CEST	Bendetti 57'	Report		Stadium: Stadio Piercesare Tombolato

5 August 2018	Venezia (2)	0–1	Südtirol (3)	Venice
20:00 CEST		Report	Fabbri 89'	Stadium: Stadio Pier Luigi Penzo

5 August 2018	Brescia (2)	1–1 (a.e.t.) (4–1 p)	Pro Vercelli (3)	Brescia
20:30 CEST	Donnarumma 47'	Report	Berri 90+3'	Stadium: Stadio Mario Rigamonti
	Penalties
	Torregrossa (penalty scored); Sabelli (penalty scored); Curcio (penalty scored); Ndoj (penalty scored)		(penalty missed) Mammarella; (penalty missed) Polidori; (penalty scored) Mal

5 August 2018	Cremonese (2)	3–3 (a.e.t.) (2–4 p)	Pisa (3)	Cremona
20:30 CEST	Montalto 16' (pen.); Castrovilli 23'; Castagnetti 119'	Report	Zammarini 3'; Masucci 67'; Cuppone 105'	Stadium: Stadio Giovanni Zini
	Penalties
	Brighenti (penalty missed); Mogoș (penalty scored); Strefezza (penalty scored); Moultan (penalty missed)		(penalty scored) Moscardelli; (penalty scored) Cuppone; (penalty scored) Masucci; (penalty scored) de Vitis

5 August 2018	Livorno (2)	1–1 (a.e.t.) (7–6 p)	Casertana (3)	Livorno
20:30 CEST	Giannetti 86'	Report	De Vena 88' (pen.)	Stadium: Stadio Armando Picchi
	Penalties
	Maiorino (penalty scored); Giannetti (penalty scored); Valiani (penalty missed); Kozák (penalty scored); M. Rocca (penalty scored); Albertazzi (penalty scored); Parisi (penalty scored); Murilo (penalty scored)		(penalty scored) De Marco; (penalty scored) De Vena; (penalty scored) Romano; (penalty missed) Santoro; (penalty scored) Pinna; (penalty scored) Rainone; (penalty scored) Lorenzini; (penalty missed) Ferrara

5 August 2018	Padova (2)	1–0	Monza (3)	Padua
20:30 CEST	Capelli 50'	Report		Stadium: Stadio Euganeo

5 August 2018	Palermo (2)	2–2 (a.e.t.) (6–5 p)	Vicenza (3)	Palermo
20:30 CEST	Rajković 90+4', 117'	Report	Giacomelli 90+2'; Tronco 101'	Stadium: Stadio Renzo Barbera
	Penalties
	Nestrorovski (penalty missed); Trajkovski (penalty scored); Embalo (penalty scored); Salvi (penalty scored); C. Fiore (penalty scored); Bellusci (penalty scored)		(penalty scored) Giacomelli; (penalty scored) Tronco; (penalty missed) Gashi; (penalty scored) Bonetti; (penalty scored) Zonta; (penalty scored) Grandi; (penalty scored) Stevanin

5 August 2018	Perugia (2)	1–3	Novara (3)	Perugia
20:30 CEST	Vido 73'	Report	Stoppa 4'; Schiavi 35'; Simeri 86'	Stadium: Stadio Renato Curi

5 August 2018	Pescara (2)	2–2 (a.e.t.) (4–3 p)	Pordenone (3)	Pescara
20:30 CEST	Brugman 45'; Cocco 69'	Report	Burrai 68'; Magnaghi 79'	Stadium: Stadio Adriatico-Giovanni Cornacchia
	Penalties
	Brugman (penalty scored); Monachello (penalty missed); Machín (penalty missed); Gavillon (penalty scored); Bunino (penalty scored); Proietti (penalty scored)		(penalty missed) De Agostino; (penalty scored) Burrai; (penalty scored) Bombagi; (penalty scored) Ciurria; (penalty missed) Stefani; (penalty missed) Bertolli

5 August 2018	Hellas Verona (2)	4–1	Juve Stabia (3)	Verona
20:30 CEST	Matos 8'; A. Caracciolo 33'; Pazzini 59'; Di Carmine 73'	Report	Canotto 48'	Stadium: Stadio Marcantonio Bentegodi

5 August 2018	Virtus Entella (3)	3–0	Siena (3)	Chiavari
20:30 CEST	Belli 20'; Petrović 32'; Di Paola 60'	Report		Stadium: Stadio Comunale

5 August 2018	Crotone (2)	4–0	Giana Erminio (3)	Crotone
20:30 CEST	Stoian 4', 54'; Nalini 39'; Firenze 87'	Report		Stadium: Stadio Ezio Scida

5 August 2018	Foggia (2)	1–3	Catania (3)	Foggia
20:30 CEST	Rossetti 13', 80'; Lodi 73'	Report	Gori 70'	Stadium: Stadio Pino Zaccheria

5 August 2018	Salernitana (2)	6–1	Rezzato (4)	Salerno
20:30 CEST	Bocalon 33', 68'; Vuletich 62'; Volpicelli 81'; Odjer 84'; Castiglia 90+1'	Report	Bruno 60'	Stadium: Stadio Arechi

7 August 2018	Lecce (2)	1–0 (a.e.t.)	FeralpiSalò (3)	Lecce
20:30 CEST	Palombi 93'	Report		Stadium: Stadio Via del Mare

=== Third round ===
A total of 32 teams from Serie A, Serie B and Serie C competed in the third round, sixteen of which advanced to the fourth round. The third round matches were played on 11 and 12 August 2018.

11 August 2018	Udinese (1)	1–2 (a.e.t.)	Benevento (2)	Udine
20:00 CEST	Machís 7'	Report	Viola 70'; Tello 104'	Stadium: Dacia Arena

11 August 2018	Genoa (1)	4–0	Lecce (2)	Genoa
21:15 CEST	Piątek 2', 9', 18', 38'	Report		Stadium: Stadio Luigi Ferraris

12 August 2018	Sampdoria (1)	1–0	Viterbese (3)	Genoa
20:30 CEST	Jankto 75'	Report		Stadium: Stadio Luigi Ferraris

12 August 2018	Spezia (2)	0–1	SPAL (1)	La Spezia
18:30 CEST		Report	Petagna 47'	Stadium: Stadio Alberto Picco
Note: Tie reversed from the original draw

12 August 2018	Sassuolo (1)	5–1	Ternana (3)	Reggio Emilia
20:30 CEST	Boateng 9'; Berardi 21' (pen.), 41'; Duncan 27'; Magnanelli 80'	Report	Defendi 72'	Stadium: Mapei Stadium – Città del Tricolore

12 August 2018	Catania (3)	2–0	Hellas Verona (2)	Catania
18:00 CEST	Silvestri 33'; Marotta 41'	Report		Stadium: Stadio Angelo Massimino
Note: Tie reversed from the original draw

12 August 2018	Parma (1)	0–1	Pisa (3)	Parma
20:30 CEST		Report	Zammarini 28'	Stadium: Stadio Ennio Tardini

12 August 2018	Brescia (2)	2–2 (a.e.t.) (4–5 p)	Novara (3)	Brescia
20:30 CEST	Donnarumma 10'; Torregrossa 58' (pen.)	Report	Schiavi 70'; Sciaudone 80'	Stadium: Stadio Mario Rigamonti
	Penalties
	Morosini (penalty scored); Gastaldello (penalty scored); Donnarumma (penalty missed); Curcio (penalty scored); Ndoj (penalty scored)		(penalty scored) Visconti; (penalty scored) Sciaudone; (penalty scored) Maniero; (penalty scored) Ronaldo Pompeu; (penalty scored) Simeri

12 August 2018	Empoli (1)	0–3	Cittadella (2)	Empoli
20:30 CEST		Report	Scappini 17', 55'; Finotto 65'	Stadium: Stadio Carlo Castellani

12 August 2018	Torino (1)	4–0	Cosenza (2)	Turin
20:45 CEST	Baselli 9'; Belottti 28', 65'; Rincón 67'	Report		Stadium: Stadio Olimpico Grande Torino

12 August 2018	Frosinone (1)	0–2	Südtirol (3)	Benevento
20:30 CEST		Report	Costantino 40'; Turchetta 88'	Stadium: Stadio Ciro Vigorito; Attendance: 0 (Note: The Frosinone v Südtirol match was played behind closed doors)
Note: The Stadio Benito Stirpe was disqualified and it was decided to play in Benevento behind closed doors.

12 August 2018	Virtus Entella (3)	2–0	Salernitana (2)	Chiavari
20:30 CEST	Currarino 2'; Mota 6'	Report		Stadium: Stadio Comunale

12 August 2018	Bologna (1)	2–0	Padova (2)	Bologna
21:00 CEST	Džemaili 71' (pen.); Dijks 78'	Report		Stadium: Stadio Renato Dall'Ara

12 August 2018	Livorno (2)	0–1	Crotone (2)	Livorno
20:30 CEST		Report	Rohdén 61'	Stadium: Stadio Armando Picchi

12 August 2018	Chievo (1)	1–0	Pescara (2)	Verona
20:30 CEST	Rigoni 55'	Report		Stadium: Stadio Marc'Antonio Bentegodi

12 August 2018	Cagliari (1)	2–1	Palermo (2)	Cagliari
20:30 CEST	Pavoletti 31', 73'	Report	Nestorovski 52' (pen.)	Stadium: Sardegna Arena

=== Fourth round ===
A total of sixteen teams from Serie A, Serie B and Serie C competed in the fourth round, eight of which advanced to the round of 16. The fourth round matches were played on 4, 5 and 6 December 2018.

4 December 2018	Benevento (2)	1–0	Cittadella (2)	Benevento
15:00 CET (UTC+1)	Bandinelli 77'	Report		Stadium: Stadio Ciro Vigorito; Referee: Federico Dionisi

4 December 2018	Bologna (1)	3–0	Crotone (2)	Bologna
18:00 CET (UTC+1)	Orsolini 40', 67'; Falcinelli 56'	Report		Stadium: Stadio Renato Dall'Ara; Referee: Juan Luca Sacchi

4 December 2018	Sampdoria (1)	2–1	SPAL (1)	Genoa
20:45 CET (UTC+1)	Defrel 45+1'; Kownacki 82'	Report	Floccari 34'	Stadium: Stadio Luigi Ferraris; Referee: Aleandro Di Paolo

5 December 2018	Novara (3)	3–2	Pisa (3)	Novara
15:00 CET (UTC+1)	Peralta 22'; Bove 53'; Manconi 90+1'	Report	Marconi 16'; Lisi 72'	Stadium: Stadio Silvio Piola; Referee: Lorenzo Illuzzi

5 December 2018	Sassuolo (1)	2–1	Catania (3)	Sassuolo
18:00 CET (UTC+1)	Matri 14'; Locatelli 80'	Report	Brodić 41'	Stadium: Mapei Stadium – Città del Tricolore; Referee: Antonio Rapuano

5 December 2018	Chievo (1)	1–2	Cagliari (1)	Verona
20:45 CET (UTC+1)	Léris 18'	Report	Cerri 8'; Pisacane 68'	Stadium: Stadio Marcantonio Bentegodi; Referee: Luigi Nasca

6 December 2018	Genoa (1)	3–3 (a.e.t.) (6–7 p)	Virtus Entella (3)	Genoa
18:00 CET (UTC+1)	Piątek 27' (pen.), 86' (pen.); Lapadula 110' (pen.)	Report	Icardi 20', 83'; Adorján 120+2'	Stadium: Stadio Luigi Ferraris; Referee: Valerio Marini
	Penalties
	Bessa (penalty missed); Veloso (penalty scored); Sandro (penalty scored); Biraschi (penalty scored); Piątek (penalty scored); Zukanović (penalty scored); Rômulo (penalty scored); Lapadula (penalty missed)		(penalty scored) Mota; (penalty scored) Nizzetto; (penalty missed) Baroni; (penalty scored) Belli; (penalty scored) Paolucci; (penalty scored) Di Paola; (penalty scored) Icardi; (penalty scored) Adorján

6 December 2018	Torino (1)	2–0	Südtirol (3)	Turin
20:45 CET (UTC+1)	Soriano 24'; Edera 81'	Report		Stadium: Stadio Olimpico Grande Torino; Referee: Daniele Minelli

== Final stage ==
=== Bracket ===
Round of 16
Torino (1)	0
Fiorentina (1)	2
Roma (1)	4
Virtus Entella (3)	0
Cagliari (1)	0
Atalanta (1)	2
Bologna (1)	0
Juventus (1)	2
Internazionale (1)	6
Benevento (2)	2
Lazio (1)	4
Novara (3)	1
Sampdoria (1)	0
Milan (1) (a.e.t.)	2
Napoli (1)	2
Sassuolo (1)	0

Quarter-finals
Fiorentina	7
Roma	1
Atalanta	3
Juventus	0
Internazionale	1 (3)
Lazio (p)	1 (4)
Milan	2
Napoli	0

Semi-finals
Fiorentina	3	1	4
Atalanta	3	2	5
Lazio	0	1	1
Milan	0	0	0

Final
Atalanta	0
Lazio	2

==== Round of 16 ====
Round of 16 matches were played from 12 to 14 January 2019.

12 January 2019	Lazio (1)	4–1	Novara (3)	Rome
15:00 CET (UTC+1)	Luis Alberto 12'; Immobile 20', 35'; Milinković-Savić 45+3'	Report	Eusepi 49' (pen.)	Stadium: Stadio Olimpico; Attendance: 15,604; Referee: Eugenio Abbattista

12 January 2019	Sampdoria (1)	0–2 (a.e.t.)	Milan (1)	Genoa
18:00 CET (UTC+1)		Report	Cutrone 102', 108'	Stadium: Stadio Luigi Ferraris; Attendance: 14,854; Referee: Fabrizio Pasqua

12 January 2019	Bologna (1)	0–2	Juventus (1)	Bologna
20:45 CET (UTC+1)		Report	Bernardeschi 9'; Kean 49'	Stadium: Stadio Renato Dall'Ara; Attendance: 15,469; Referee: Federico La Penna

13 January 2019	Torino (1)	0–2	Fiorentina (1)	Turin
15:00 CET (UTC+1)		Report	Chiesa 87', 90+2'	Stadium: Stadio Olimpico Grande Torino; Attendance: 16,957; Referee: Rosario Abisso

13 January 2019	Internazionale (1)	6–2	Benevento (2)	Milan
18:00 CET (UTC+1)	Icardi 3' (pen.); Candreva 7', 90+5'; Dalbert 45+1'; Martínez 48', 66'	Report	Insigne 58'; Bandinelli 74'	Stadium: San Siro; Attendance: 0 (Note: The Inter v Benevento match was played behind closed doors due to punishment by Serie A after alleged racist chants by Inter supporters in their match against Napoli.); Referee: Antonio Giua

13 January 2019	Napoli (1)	2–0	Sassuolo (1)	Naples
20:45 CET (UTC+1)	Milik 15'; Fabián 74'	Report		Stadium: Stadio San Paolo; Attendance: 14,908; Referee: Daniele Chiffi

14 January 2019	Cagliari (1)	0–2	Atalanta (1)	Cagliari
17:30 CET (UTC+1)		Report	Zapata 88'; Pašalić 90+3'	Stadium: Sardegna Arena; Attendance: 10,119; Referee: Marco Piccinini

14 January 2019	Roma (1)	4–0	Virtus Entella (3)	Rome
21:00 CET (UTC+1)	Schick 1', 47'; Marcano 45+2'; Pastore 75'	Report		Stadium: Stadio Olimpico; Attendance: 20,984; Referee: Aleandro Di Paolo

==== Quarter-finals ====
Quarter-final matches were played from 29 to 31 January 2019.

29 January 2019	Milan (1)	2–0	Napoli (1)	Milan
20:45 CET (UTC+1)	Piątek 10', 27'	Report		Stadium: San Siro; Attendance: 22,289; Referee: Piero Giacomelli

30 January 2019	Fiorentina (1)	7–1	Roma (1)	Florence
17:30 CET (UTC+1)	Chiesa 7', 18', 74'; Muriel 33'; Benassi 66'; Simeone 79', 89'	Report	Kolarov 28'	Stadium: Stadio Artemio Franchi; Attendance: 21,190; Referee: Gianluca Manganiello

30 January 2019	Atalanta (1)	3–0	Juventus (1)	Bergamo
20:45 CET (UTC+1)	Castagne 37'; Zapata 39', 86'	Report		Stadium: Stadio Atleti Azzurri d'Italia; Attendance: 18,438; Referee: Fabrizio Pasqua

31 January 2019	Internazionale (1)	1–1 (a.e.t.) (3–4 p)	Lazio (1)	Milan
21:00 CET (UTC+1)	Icardi 120+5' (pen.)	Report	Immobile 108'	Stadium: San Siro; Attendance: 23,408; Referee: Rosario Abisso
	Penalties
	Brozović (penalty scored); Martínez (penalty missed); Icardi (penalty scored); Cédric (penalty scored); Nainggolan (penalty missed)		(penalty scored) Immobile; (penalty missed) Durmisi; (penalty scored) Parolo; (penalty scored) Acerbi; (penalty scored) Lucas

==== Semi-finals ====
The first legs of the semi-finals were played on 26 and 27 February and the second legs on 24 and 25 April 2019.

===== First leg =====
26 February 2019	Lazio (1)	0–0	Milan (1)	Rome
21:00 CET (UTC+1)		Report		Stadium: Stadio Olimpico; Attendance: 31,235; Referee: Daniele Orsato

27 February 2019	Fiorentina (1)	3–3	Atalanta (1)	Florence
21:00 CET (UTC+1)	Chiesa 33'; Benassi 36'; Muriel 79'	Report	Gómez 16'; Pašalić 18'; De Roon 58'	Stadium: Stadio Artemio Franchi; Attendance: 34,437; Referee: Piero Giacomelli

===== Second leg =====
24 April 2019	Milan (1)	0–1 (0–1 agg.)	Lazio (1)	Milan
20:45 CEST (UTC+2)		Report	Correa 58'	Stadium: San Siro; Attendance: 61,045; Referee: Paolo Mazzoleni

25 April 2019	Atalanta (1)	2–1 (5–4 agg.)	Fiorentina (1)	Bergamo
20:45 CEST (UTC+2)	Iličić 14' (pen.); Gómez 69'	Report	Muriel 3'	Stadium: Stadio Atleti Azzurri d'Italia; Attendance: 20,416; Referee: Gianpaolo Calvarese

== Final ==
15 May 2019
20:45 CEST (UTC+2)

Atalanta	0–2	Lazio
	Report	Milinković-Savić 82'; Correa 90'

Stadio Olimpico, Rome
Attendance: 57,059
Referee: Luca Banti

== Top goalscorers ==
Rank	Player	Club(s)	Goals
1	(Poland) Krzysztof Piątek	Genoa/Milan	8
2	(Italy) Federico Chiesa	Fiorentina	6
3	(Italy) Ciro Immobile	Lazio	3
3	(Colombia) Luis Muriel	Fiorentina	3
3	(Italy) Mattia Rossetti	Catania	3
3	(Colombia) Duván Zapata	Atalanta	3
