= Alessandro Fabbri =

Alessandro Fabbri may refer to:

- Alessandro Fabbri (naval officer)
- Alessandro Fabbri (footballer)
- Alessandro Fabbri (screenwriter)
