= Daniele Altobelli =

Italian footballer (born 1993)

Personal information
- Date of birth: 18 March 1993 (age 33)
- Place of birth: Terracina, Italy
- Height: 1.88 m (6 ft 2 in)
- Position: Midfielder

Team information
- Current team: Sarnese
- Number: 25

Youth career
- Frosinone

Senior career*
Years	Team	Apps	(Gls)
2012–2016	Frosinone	36	(3)
2015	→ Ascoli (loan)	8	(0)
2015–2016	→ Ascoli (loan)	26	(1)
2016–2018	Pro Vercelli	52	(1)
2018–2020	Salernitana	0	(0)
2018–2019	→ Ternana (loan)	25	(0)
2019–2020	→ Feralpisalò (loan)	21	(1)
2020–2021	Catanzaro	11	(0)
2021	Arezzo	17	(2)
2021–2023	Juve Stabia	64	(3)
2023–2024	Monterosi	13	(0)
2024	→ Crotone (loan)	1	(0)
2024–	Sarnese	8	(1)
- * Club domestic league appearances and goals as of 17 November 2024

Daniele Altobelli (born 18 March 1993) is an Italian footballer who plays as a midfielder for Serie D club Sarnese.

== Career ==
He made his professional debut in the Lega Pro for Frosinone on 7 October 2012 in a game against Avellino.

On 2 September 2019, he joined Feralpisalò on loan.

On 3 October 2020, he signed a two-year contract with Catanzaro.

On 5 January 2021, he moved to Arezzo.

On 27 July 2021, he joined Juve Stabia.
