= Michele Currarino =

Italian footballer

Personal information
- Date of birth: 6 August 1992 (age 34)
- Place of birth: Levanto, Italy
- Height: 1.77 m (5 ft 10 in)
- Position: Midfielder

Team information
- Current team: Luparense

Senior career*
| Years | Team | Apps | (Gls) |
| 2010–2011 | Virtus Entella | 1 | (0) |
| 2011–2017 | Lavagnese | 167 | (46) |
| 2017–2021 | Virtus Entella | 38 | (0) |
| 2021 | Monopoli | 6 | (0) |
| 2021–2023 | Fiorenzuola | 52 | (3) |
| 2023–2024 | Renate | 25 | (1) |
| 2024–2025 | Livorno | 10 | (0) |
| 2025– | Luparense | 0 | (0) |
- * Club domestic league appearances and goals as of 4 May 2025

Michele Currarino (born 6 August 1992) is an Italian footballer who plays as a midfielder for Serie D club Luparense.

== Club career ==
He made his Serie B debut for Virtus Entella on 9 December 2017 in a game against Ascoli.

On 6 January 2021, he signed a 1.5-year contract with Monopoli.

On 26 August 2021, he joined to Fiorenzuola.
