= ASD Sarnese 1926 =

Italian football club

Sarnese
- Full name: Associazione Sportiva Dilettantistica Sarnese 1926
- Nickname: I Granata
- Founded: 1926; 1994 (refounded); 2013 (refounded); 2019 (refounded)
- Ground: Stadio Felice Squitieri, Sarno, Italy
- Capacity: 4,000
- Chairman: Aniello Pappacena
- Manager: Teore Grimaldi
- League: Serie D Girone G
- 2023–24: Eccellenza Campania, 1st (promoted)
Home colours	Away colours

ASD Sarnese 1926, commonly known as Sarnese, is an Italian football club based in Sarno, in the Province of Salerno. The team competes in Serie D, the fourth tier of the Italian football league system. Its traditional colour is maroon, and its symbol is the hippogriff. The club plays its home matches at the Felice Squitieri Stadium in Sarno.

== History ==
Founded in 1926, the club initially played only local matches sporadically. In the 1930s, it began participating in championships organized by the federation. Under the presidency of Avvocato De Vivo, the team competed in several seasons of the Seconda Divisione. The outbreak of World War II halted sporting activities. In 1943, under the presidency of Andrea Vagito, there was an attempt to reorganize and enter the team in the 1942–1943 Seconda Divisione championship, but the venture lasted only one season due to the ongoing Italian Campaign.

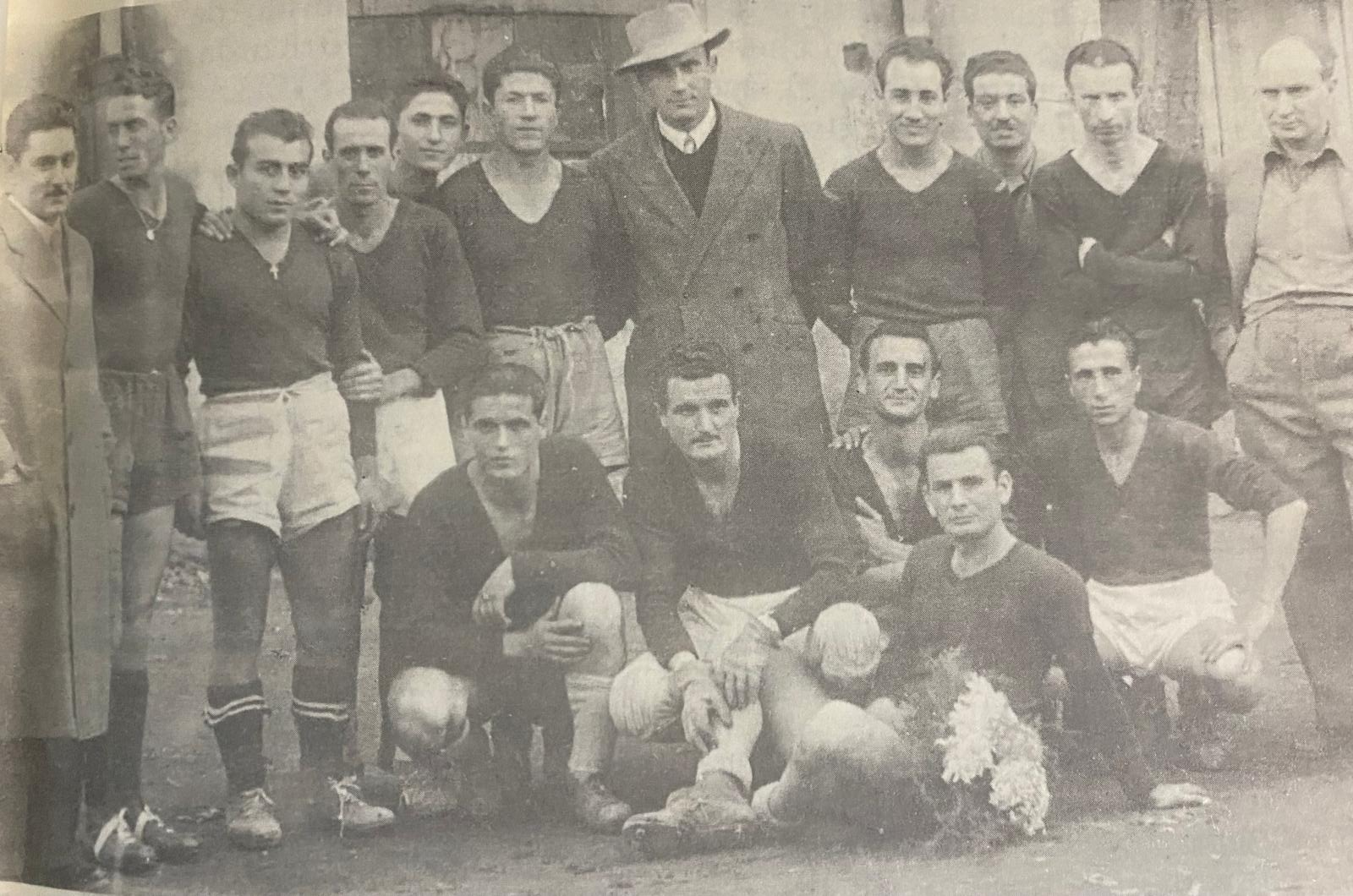
One of the earliest Sarnese line-ups in the immediate post-World War II period.

After World War II, led by then-president Michele De Filippo, Sarnese promptly resumed sporting activities, participating in the 1945-1946 Prima Divisione Campania, where it finished third in its group, and the 1946-1947 Prima Divisione, where it placed fifth in its group. Despite significant logistical challenges, with players often traveling to away matches by bicycle, and difficulties securing funding in post-war Italy, the team, featuring players such as Francesco Moncada, Antonio Barbuto, Salvatore Annunziata, Carmelo Annunziata, Carmelo Salvato, Antonio La Rocca, and Antonio Franco, competed in the Seconda Divisione during the late 1940s and early 1950s. However, financial difficulties led the team to withdraw from federal tournaments throughout the 1950s.

=== The 1960s: The Esposito presidency ===
In the late 1950s and early 1960s, as the city of Sarno benefited from the Italian economic miracle, a group of young local football enthusiasts, including Celestino Caiazza, Alberto Sparaneo, and Francesco Buonaiuto, decided to pool their resources to enter the team in federal championships. The team, named Polisportiva Sarnese, relied on self-funding and contributions from spectators. Among the first players to take the field for the new city team were, in addition to Caiazza, Beniamino Annunziata, Venerando Esposito, Giovanni Squitieri, Franco and Antonio Robustelli, Agostino and Domenico Lanzetta, and Daniele Vitolo. Coached by Pasquale Dato, the team participated in the Terza Categoria championship and, in the 1959–1960 season, won it with a 20-point lead over the second-placed team, earning promotion to the Seconda Categoria. In the early 1960s, Mario Senatore became president and appointed Francesco Mazzetti, a demanding coach who introduced more professional training methods and solidified the adoption of the maroon jersey for Sarnese.

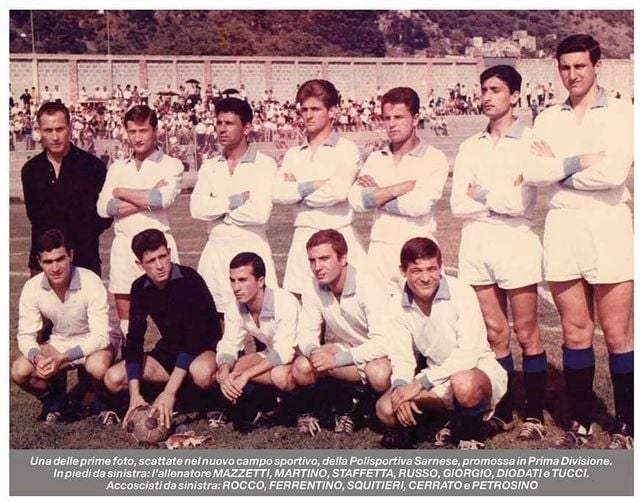
A photo of Polisportiva Sarnese in 1965

In the 1965–1966 season, marking the club’s 40th anniversary, Sarnese competed in the Seconda Categoria Campania with a squad composed almost entirely of local players, including Agostino Lanzetta, Celeste Caiazza, Beniamino Annunziata, Antonio Robustelli, Antonio Cerrato, Mario Giudice, Michele De Stefano, Emilio Diodati, Domenico Lanzetta, Giovanni Squitieri, and Raimondo Russo. The maroons dominated Group H, finishing first and undefeated, but to secure promotion to the Prima Categoria, they had to compete in a four-team playoff group against Ascea, Mazzola, and Libertas Stabia. The decisive match was played against Ascea in the final round, with both teams tied at the top. The game, held in Ascea, saw over a thousand Sarnese fans travel to the stadium. During the game, Sarnese’s centre-forward Cerrato was fouled and dragged off the field by opponents, prompting Sarnese fans to invade the pitch, forcing the referee to suspend the match. The maroon players and officials managed to calm the fans, allowing the game to resume. Sarnese won 1–0 on the field, thanks to a goal by Martino, but Ascea lodged a protest, initially winning the appeal. However, the Federal Appeals Commission ultimately upheld the 1–0 result, confirming Sarnese’s promotion to the Prima Categoria, then the fifth tier of Italian football. In their debut season, Mazzetti was replaced by Felice Baiardini from Nocera Inferiore, a decision by President Esposito that sparked protests from fans demanding Mazzetti’s return and Esposito’s resignation. Esposito stepped down, but the team, under Mazzetti, lost all five opening matches, leading fans to call for Esposito’s return. Upon his return, Esposito sacked Mazzetti and permanently appointed Baiardini, who led the maroons to a fifth-place finish in the 1966-1967 Prima Categoria Campania, securing entry to the newly established Promozione championship for the following season.

In their first season in Promozione, the team finished fourth in Group B of the 1967-1968 Promozione, just two points shy of promotion. The following season, they maintained a strong position, finishing fifth in Group B of the 1968-1969 Promozione. However, in their third season in Promozione, financial difficulties mounted for President Mario Esposito, and despite ambitions to compete for promotion, the team endured a disastrous season, finishing last in the 1969-1970 season and being relegated back to Prima Categoria Campania.

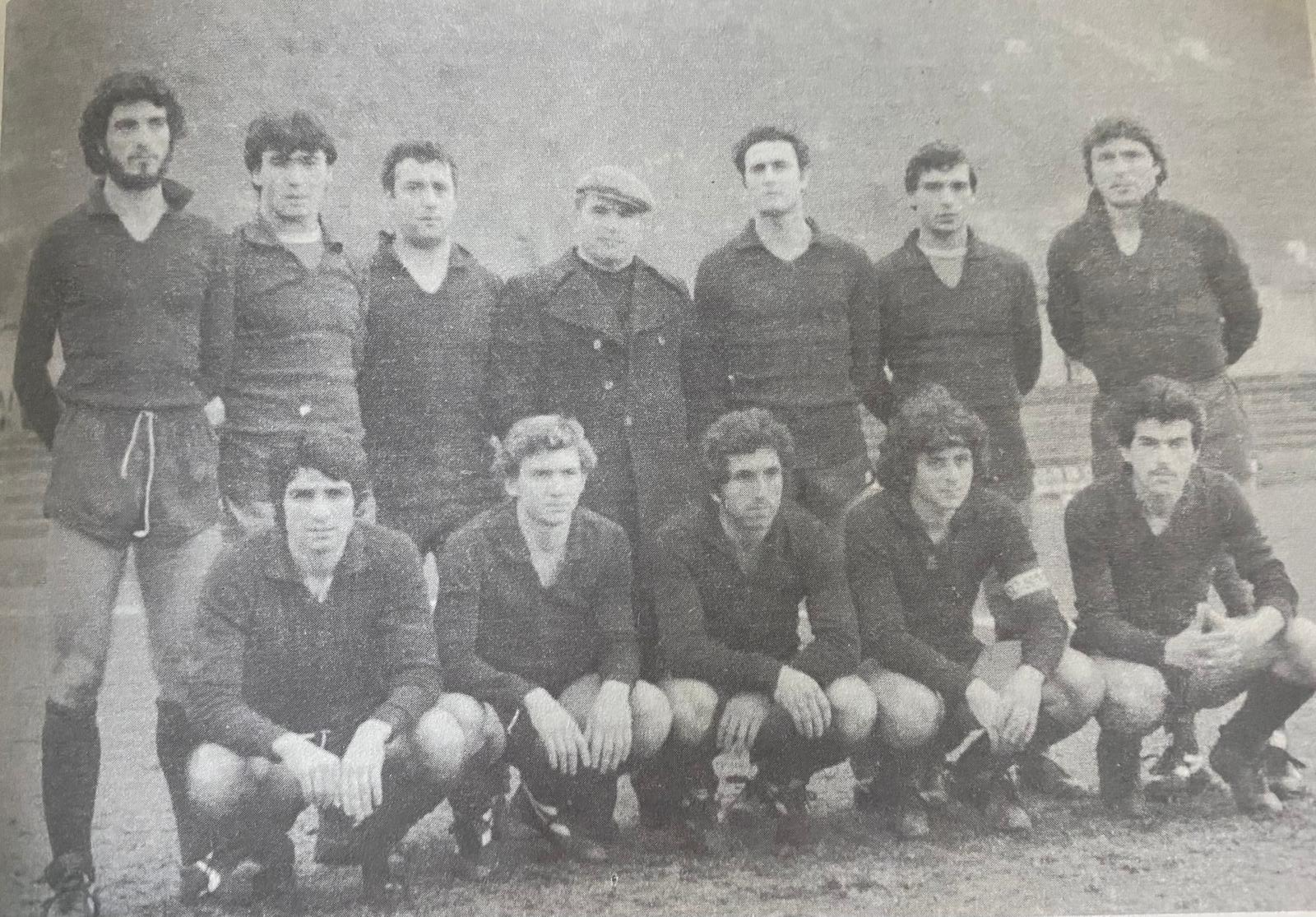
A Sarnese line-up from the 1970s, with President Pagliarulo recognizable in the centre, wearing a cap

=== The 1970s: The Pagliarulo presidency ===
The club, now back in Prima Categoria, was taken over by Michele Pagliarulo, who led it through most of the 1970s. On the field, the Sarnese squad, featuring players such as Mario Odierna, Antonio Mari, Andrea Mandile, Agostino Lanzetta, Nicastro, Coppola, Vincenzo Pepe, and goalkeeper Greco, won the Prima Categoria championship in the 1970–1971 season, immediately regaining promotion to Promozione. After just one season, the maroons secured a return to Promozione, where they remained for three seasons, from 1971–72 to 1973–74, before being relegated again to Prima Categoria after finishing last in Group B. In the 1976–1977 season, after two seasons away, Sarnese returned to Promozione, finishing fifth in Group B as a newly promoted side, achieving notable victories against Irpinia and Colombo Olimpic of San Giovanni a Teduccio, who finished first and second in the group. During these years, Sarnese fielded several local players, including Salvatore Robustelli, Alfonso Crescenzi, Franco Prevete, Michele and Alfredo Salerno, Aurelio Squitieri, Antonio Rizzo, Mario Odierna, and Michele Molisse, finishing the next two seasons in Promozione with a 12th and an eighth-place finish. However, in the 1979–1980 season, after just five matches, President Pagliarulo decided to transfer the club’s sporting title to the Municipality of Sarno to avoid bankruptcy. On the field, the team finished 14th in Group C, a position that relegated them to Prima Categoria, but they were later reinstated due to Poseidon’s disqualification for sporting misconduct.

=== The 1980s: The first Pappacena presidency and the Interregionale ===
Following the transfer of the sporting title to the municipality, a consortium of 16 stakeholders, including local entrepreneur Aniello Pappacena, took charge of Sarnese, with Pappacena assuming leadership in the early 1980s, bringing renewed enthusiasm to the club. Former Sarnese player Sgambati was appointed coach, introducing a defensive line and offside tactics. After finishing second in Group C of the 1981–1982 Promozione championship, behind rivals Battipagliese, Sarnese, under the guidance of coach Gaetano Vergazzola in the 1982–1983 season, fielded a starting eleven of Vicedomini, Vietri, Carotenuto, Abate, Ciancia, Santucci, Robustelli, Aurilio, Giovino, De Gregorio, and Nisi. They finished first in Group C with only two losses all season, six points ahead of rivals Battipagliese. With only two promotion spots available for the Interregionale across three Promozione groups, the group winners competed in a final knockout round on neutral fields. Sarnese faced Saviano and Santantimese at the Stadio Amerigo Liguori in Torre del Greco. Against Saviano, despite playing well, Sarnese lost 1–0 due to the opposing goalkeeper’s performance. The Saviano-Santantimese match ended 0–0, meaning Sarnese needed a victory against Santantimese to secure promotion. They won 1–0, with a second-half goal by Nisi from a corner, celebrating their first-ever promotion to the Interregionale.

In the Interregionale, under President Aniello Pappacena, Sarnese fought for survival in their first two seasons, finishing ninth and eleventh. In the 1985–1986 season, coach Lucchetti led a 4-4-1-1 formation featuring Bove, Paparozzi, Picardi, Squillante, Minichini, Ambra, Marotta, Calatè, Esposito, Cerciello, and Verniti. The team led the standings until February before a dip in form in the second half of the season, finishing in fourth place in Group I, just shy of the promotion zone, driven by the goals of Volpe, the group’s top scorer with 12 goals, and Cerciello. The following season, they finished ninth in Group I, six points clear of relegation, despite 15 goals from Calatè.

In the 1987–1988 season, Sarnese, in Group I for the third consecutive year, played a top-tier campaign under coach Benito Montalto, who joined in 1986. The team deployed a 4-3-3 formation with Zitola in goal, Grottola and Galasso as centre-backs, local player Luigi Squillante and Palladino as full-backs, Capiello as central midfielder, with top scorer Calatè (20 goals) and Picardi supporting, alongside key attackers Guglielmo Esposito, De Risi, Cerciello, and Del Luca. The maroons amassed 51 out of 60 possible points, narrowly missing direct promotion to Serie C2. The season ended with Sarnese tied for first with rivals Battipagliese, matching an Italian record set by Juventus when Serie A had 16 teams.

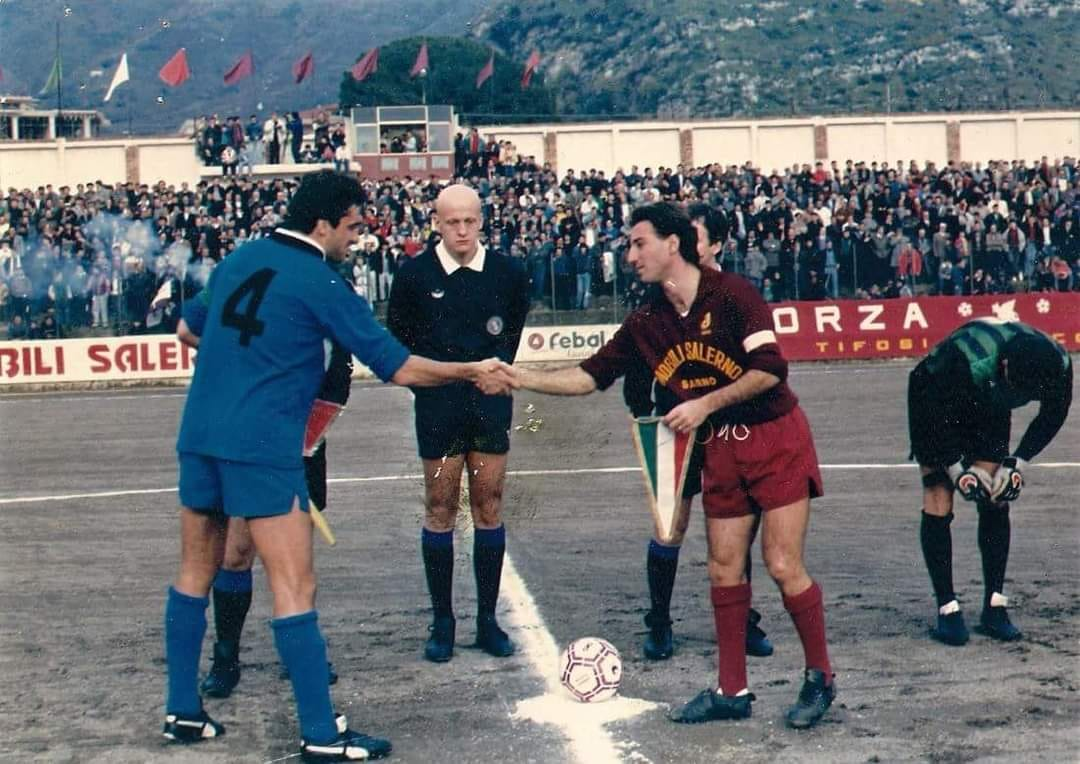
The captains of Sarnese and Battipagliese in the 1987-88 season, with Pierluigi Collina, who was young at the time, as referee.

With only one promotion spot available, a playoff was held at the neutral Stadio Romeo Menti in Castellammare di Stabia before approximately 10,000 spectators. In the 70th minute, Sarnese took the lead with Cerciello scoring on a rebound from the opposing goalkeeper. They missed a chance to double their lead when Picardi’s run down the flank set up De Risi, who shot wide. In the final moments, Condemi equalized for Battipagliese. In extra time, with penalties looming, Sarnese’s goalkeeper Zitola misjudged a cross in the 119th minute, allowing Battipagliese’s striker Pascariello to score the decisive 2–1 goal. Talks of a possible Serie C2 promotion for sporting merit followed the playoff loss, but Potenza was eventually promoted, leaving Sarnese in Interregionale.

In the following season, under new coach Crespi, the squad was completely overhauled, with only Cappiello remaining from the near-promoted team. This marked the beginning of a decline, as Sarnese failed to stay in the division, finishing 15th in Group M and losing a relegation playoff 2–1 in extra time against Valdiano 85 in Pontecagnano, dropping to Promozione after six years. In the 1989–90 Promozione season, Sarnese finished seventh in Group B, but at the season’s end, President Pappacena decided to sell the club, which ceased operations with the transfer of its sporting title to Angri in the summer of 1990.

=== Revival and long stay in Promozione ===
In the 1990s, the club was refounded and competed in Seconda Categoria and Prima Categoria before returning to Promozione after finishing second in the 1996–1997 Prima Categoria. At the end of the 1999–2000 season, the club adopted the name S.C. Sarnese 1926. In the early 2000s, Sarnese continued to compete in Promozione with mixed results. In the 2002–2003 season, they finished third in Group C of Promozione Campania, and the following season, they narrowly missed promotion to Eccellenza, finishing second in Group C. In the 2006–2007 season, a poor campaign saw them finish 16th in Group B of Promozione, relegating them to Prima Categoria after a decade, but they were later reinstated, maintaining their place in Promozione.

Under the renewed presidency of Aniello Pappacena, who had led the club in the 1980s, Sarnese, after over a decade in Promozione, won the championship in the 2009–2010 season with four matches to spare, earning promotion to Eccellenza.

=== The Sarno Derby season: 2010–2011 ===
In the top regional division, Sarnese emerged as a promotion contender and, for the first and only time in its history, faced a unique city derby against another Sarno-based team, Ippogrifo Sarno. That summer, local media speculated about a possible merger between the two clubs, but both managements denied the rumours. In the first half of the season, Ippogrifo defeated Sarnese, coached initially by Giovanni Renna, 2–1. In the return match, Sarnese secured their first derby win with a goal from Rima early in the second half.

The two teams met again in the semifinals of the Coppa Italia Regionale. A total of six goals were scored across the two legs: in the first leg, Sarnese won 1–0 away with a goal from Siano, while in the return leg, Ippogrifo mounted a comeback, winning a thrilling match with goals from Aurino, D’Antò, and Vitiello against Sarnese’s two from Tufano and Rima, advancing to the final.

After a long chase for direct promotion, the newly promoted maroons finished the season just behind Ippogrifo in third place, qualifying for the playoffs. In the regional playoff final, they defeated their city rivals 2–0 with goals from Tufano and Rima. Sarnese then successfully navigated the national playoffs, with Pirozzi’s team defeating Capo Rizzuto 5–0 at the Squitieri and 2–1 away in the semifinals, before winning the final against Biancadrano 4–1 on aggregate, earning promotion to Serie D, marking their return to the fifth tier of Italian football for the first time since the 1988-1989 Campionato Interregionale and the first time under the Serie D designation.

=== Return to Serie D ===
In Serie D, Sarnese excelled for two seasons at the top of the standings, coming close to promotion to Lega Pro Seconda Divisione. This success was fueled by their home turf advantage at the Squitieri Stadium. From the 2009–2010 season, which saw their rise from Regional Promozione to Serie D via Eccellenza, Sarnese suffered only two home losses in 2009. They earned 38 out of 42 possible points in the 2009–2010 season, dropping points only to Palmese and Carotenuto. In the 2010–2011 season, which secured their promotion to Serie D, the maroons collected 40 out of 45 possible points at home. Palmese was the first to "breach" the Squitieri after over a year, marking Sarnese’s only home loss in 2010, with Faiano also managing a draw. From the 2009–2010 to the 2011–2012 seasons, Sarnese amassed 90 points in 34 home matches, averaging an impressive 2.64 points per game.

In the 2011–2012 season, coached by Egidio Pirozzi, Sarnese delivered a stellar campaign, consistently vying for top spots. After a 4–1 away win against Gaeta, they stood alone at the top of the table with four matches remaining. They held the lead until the final day with a two-point advantage over Martina, but a 2–1 loss in a direct clash on neutral ground in Bitonto saw them overtaken, finishing in second place in Group H. Following the Bitonto defeat, Sarnese entered the playoffs to pursue promotion to Lega Pro Seconda Divisione. In the first round, they defeated Brindisi 3–1 at the Felice Squitieri with goals from D’Avanzo, Tufano, and Ragosta. In the second round, they won 2–0 at home against Casertana, with goals from D’Avanzo and Olcese, dominating the match. However, in the third phase of the national playoffs, they were eliminated on penalties by the Ligurian team Lavagnese.

In the 2012–2013 season, Sarnese participated in the Coppa Italia for the first time, entering the preliminary rounds and facing Lumezzane in the first round. Their campaign ended immediately with a 3–0 loss in Lodi, featuring a brace from future Chievo and Parma striker Roberto Inglese. In the league, led by defender Antonio Noto, who played for Sarnese from 2009 to 2013 and was the first player in the new millennium to make over 100 appearances for the club, and the attacking duo of Argentine Emiliano “La Tota” Olcese and Michele Tarallo, the team finished third in Group G of the Serie D. However, the third-place finish was not deemed satisfactory by the management, which, facing financial difficulties, opted not to participate in the playoffs and withdrew from the subsequent championship for financial reasons.

=== The Polisportiva years: 2013–2019 ===
==== 2013–14: Restart and immediate promotion to Serie D ====
On 25 July 2013, Polisportiva Sarnese was founded, taking over the sporting title of Real Trentinara. The team entered the Eccellenza championship, placed in Group B for the 2013–2014 season, with former Savoia coach Pasquale Vitter appointed as manager. Under President Francesco Origo, the new club assembled a competitive squad aiming for an immediate return to Serie D, including players such as midfielder Michele Suarato and striker Domenico Maggio, alongside local talents such as striker Mauro Adiletta, who had previously played for Sarnese, Paolo Siano, who had nearly reached Lega Pro Seconda Divisione with Sarnese two seasons prior, Alessandro Squitieri, a 1987-born striker with Eccellenza experience, Antonio Squitieri, a 1993-born winger from Salernitana’s youth academy, and veteran goalkeeper Gaetano Sirica from Scafatese. The new club marked its debut with a 5–0 win away against Giffonese in the first round of the Coppa Italia Dilettanti Campania. The league campaign started strongly with a 2–1 home win over Vis Ariano, followed by a 3–3 draw away against Scafatese, and three consecutive wins, including a 2–1 home "derby" victory over Palmese with goals from Esposito and Savarese, propelling the team to first place. However, at the sixth matchday, they suffered their first loss, a 3–1 defeat to Angri, playing with ten men for 75 minutes and missing two penalties through Maggio and Savarese. The maroons arrived at their early November home match against Virtus Scafatese as league leaders, two points ahead, but two goals in the first ten minutes led to a 2–0 loss, allowing Virtus Scafatese to overtake them. The team struggled in the next match, drawing 3–3 against Faiano with a goal from defender Amoruso in the 86th minute. Sarnese bounced back with a 1–0 win over Sant’Agnello, scored late by Ianniello, followed by six more wins, including a 4–1 home victory over rivals Sant'Antonio Abate with goals from Ottobre, G. Esposito, Romano, and Maggio, and a 1–0 away win against Poseidon with a goal from Romano, crowning them winter champions. In January, the club bolstered the squad with the signing of experienced midfielder Marco Tufano, with ten years of experience in Serie C and Serie D, but suffered a 3–2 loss to Scafatese at the Squitieri, losing the top spot. Vitter’s team rebounded with six consecutive wins, starting with a 2–0 away victory over Libertas Stabia, scored by Savarese and Tufano, followed by a 3–1 home win against Massa Lubrense, a 1–0 away victory over Palmese with Maggio’s tenth goal of the season, and a crucial 3–2 home win against Angri with goals from Ianniello, Esposito, and Maggio. The maroons regained the lead with a 3–0 win over Calpazio, featuring a brace from Romano and a goal from Maggio, and a 2–0 home win against Eclanese with goals from Maggio and Savarese. In the decisive match for the championship against Virtus Scafatese, Sarnese, leading as in the first half of the season, lost 2–0 at Scafati’s Comunale with both goals in the first half, handing the top spot to Virtus Scafatese and forcing Vitter’s team back into second place. In the penultimate match, Sarnese missed a chance to reclaim the lead, as Virtus Scafatese drew their derby with Scafatese, losing 1–0 away to Sant'Antonio Abate. Sarnese won their final match 3–0 at home against Poseidon but finished second, one point behind Virtus Scafatese. They entered the regional playoffs, advancing directly to the second round due to a 10-point gap over fifth-placed Scafatese. In the regional final, the maroons won 2–1 at the Squitieri against Angri with goals from Maggio and Tufano, earning a spot in the national playoffs for Serie D. In the national playoff semifinals, Sarnese defeated Molise’s Gioventù Calcio Dauna 3–2 on aggregate, winning 2–1 at home with goals from Fontanarosa and Pagano and drawing 1–1 away. In the two-legged final for Serie D promotion against Basilicata’s AZ Picerno, Sarnese won 2–0 away with goals from Fontanarosa and Maggio and 2–1 at the Squitieri with goals from Maggio and Tufano, securing promotion to Serie D.

=== 2014–15: Strong debut in Serie D ===
After just one season away, the maroons returned to Serie D for the 2014–15 season, placed in Group H. Manager Pasquale Vitter was retained, along with several players from the promotion-winning squad, including goalkeepers Vincenzo Cerbone and Claudio Ruocco, defenders Gianluca Esposito, Fabrizio Falanga, Raffaele Ferrara, Francesco Nasti, Domenico Pallonetto, and Fabio Testa, midfielders Ferdinando Di Capua, Simone Fontanarosa, Angelo Nasto, Ciro Iannello, Pasquale Ottobre, and Marco Tufano, while only Domenico Maggio was retained in attack. During the summer transfer window, the maroons bolstered their squad with several signings: winger Vincenzo Iovene (born 1992), with significant experience in the division, midfielder Antonio Guarro, also experienced in Serie C and Serie D, striker Errico Marcucci, who scored 32 goals for Virtus Scafatese the previous season, young goalkeeper Tommaso Nobile (born 1996), defender Andrea Romano, midfielder Davide Grenni from Avellino's youth squad, and defender Francesco Nasti, previously on loan from Savoia.

The maroons' Serie D campaign began with a heavy 3–0 away defeat to Brindisi. However, they bounced back at home, defeating Virtus Scafatese 3–2 with a last-minute goal from Tufano. In the third matchday, they lost away to Monopoli, but recovered with a 3–2 home win over Pomigliano, thanks to a Maggio brace and a Guarro goal. Another away loss followed, 2–0 to Gallipoli. In the seventh matchday, Vitter's side lost their home unbeaten streak, falling 2–1 to Fidelis Andria, with a goal from former maroon striker, Olcese. The next game, played at a neutral venue against San Severo, saw Sarnese lead 3–1 at halftime, only to be pegged back to 4–3 before a stoppage-time equalizer from Ottobre secured a 4–4 draw. In the ninth matchday, Sarnese delivered a strong 3–1 victory over Potenza, halting their six-game winning streak, with goals from Catalano, Esposito, and Maggio.

Sarnese proved formidable at home in the Squitieri Stadium, securing two more 2–1 victories against Manfredonia, with a Guarro brace, and Cavese, with goals from Di Capua and Marcucci. These wins were interspersed with away losses to Frattese and Taranto. In the fourteenth matchday, Sarnese celebrated their first away win, defeating Puteolana 1–0 with a penalty kick scored by Esposito. In December, striker Marcucci, who joined in the summer, returned to Scafatese, and after a year and a half, defender Raffaele Ferrara also left. On the pitch, Sarnese ended the first half of the season with a 1–0 home loss to Gelbison, a 1–0 away win over Francavilla, and a 2–2 comeback draw against Bisceglie, with goals from Esposito and Maggio. Sarnese finished the first half of the season in ninth place with 26 points.

The 2015 season began with a 1–0 home loss to Brindisi, conceded in stoppage time. They followed with a narrow away win over Virtus Scafatese, thanks to a Guarro goal. In the winter transfer market, Sarnese signed striker Felice Simonetti (born 1994), previously with Manfredonia, to replace Marcucci. February brought two key victories: 1–0 against Pomigliano and 2–1 against Gallipoli, moving Sarnese away from the play-out zone to seventh place. However, a month-long winless streak followed, with draws against Arzanese and San Severo, and losses to Fidelis Andria and Potenza. Sarnese returned to winning ways with a commanding 3–0 victory over Grottaglie, powered by a Guarro brace and an Ianniello goal.

The maroons emerged as the surprise of the group, comfortably achieving their goal of avoiding relegation for the season, with playoff hopes still mathematically alive with seven games remaining. After securing mathematical safety, they drew 1–1 away at Manfredonia, but suffered heavy defeats: 3–1 at home to Taranto and a 5–2 loss in the derby against Cavese. Following the loss to Cavese, the club sacked manager Pasquale Vitter with four games remaining, aiming to plan for the next season with a focus on youth development. The bench was entrusted to players Gianluca Esposito and Ciro Ianniello. After the managerial change, Sarnese failed to win in their final four games, concluding their first season back in Serie D with a 3–1 away loss to Bisceglie. They amassed 44 points from 12 wins, 8 draws, and 14 losses, scoring 51 goals (16 by Maggio, 11 by Guarro) and conceding 57, finishing in seventh place.

=== 2015–16: A mid-table season ===
At the end of the season, rumors circulated, confirmed by president Origo in a press conference, that the team might forgo Serie D registration for the next season due to financial difficulties and restart in Eccellenza. This did not materialize, and Sarnese successfully registered for the 2015–16 Serie D, placed in Group I. Former maroon striker Gianluca Esposito, confirmed as manager before the season ended, took the helm. The squad that avoided relegation was largely retained, but key departures included striker Domenico Maggio, winger Antonio Guarro (who together scored 27 goals the previous season), and goalkeeper Tommaso Nobile. To replace Nobile, young goalkeeper Luigi Sorrentino, trained in Napoli's youth system, was signed, along with defender Gabriele Pastore (born 1993).

The season started with a 3–0 home win over Agropoli, with goals from Gabbiano, Simonetti, and Ianniello. The second matchday brought a narrow loss at Granillo in Reggio Calabria against Reggina, managed by Ciccio Cozza. A 2–1 home win followed in midweek against Noto, with goals from Imparato and Savarese. Sarnese proved tough at home, but after a second away loss to Gelbison, they triumphed at the Squitieri, defeating Due Torri 3–0 with goals from Catalano, Imparato, and Savarese for their third home win in three matches. The team continued their positive run, drawing 0–0 away against Aversa Normanna, and, after a rest week, securing a 4–0 home win over Roccella in the eighth matchday. The next three matchdays yielded three points: a 0–0 draw away against Sicilian side Leonfortese and a 1–1 draw in the derby against Cavese, where Sarnese failed to capitalize on a numerical advantage and missed a penalty through Simonetti. Despite their solid league form, Sarnese suffered a heavy 5–1 defeat in the first round of the 2015–16 Coppa Italia Serie D against Marcianise.

The maroons recovered with a 1–1 away draw against Vigor Lamezia and a dramatic 3–2 home win over Rende in the twelfth matchday, sealed by a Fontanarosa brace and a stoppage-time penalty from Di Capua. After seven positive results (four draws, three wins), Sarnese suffered a 5–0 defeat at the hands of Marsala at the Angotta Stadium in Sicily, who were under pressure from their fans, while Sarnese were hampered by injuries and suspensions. Despite this second five-goal loss, Esposito’s side stayed focused, securing positive results in the final six games of the first half of the season: a Di Capua penalty earned a win over Siracusa, managed by Andrea Sottil, followed by three draws—1–1 against Vibonese, and 0–0 against Frattese and Gragnano. A narrow home win over Scordia, thanks to an own goal, ensured Sarnese ended the first half of the season unbeaten at home.

The 2016 season began poorly with a 3–0 away loss to Agropoli at the Guariglia Stadium, allowing the dolphins their first home league win. However, Sarnese maintained their home unbeaten streak with a 1–1 draw against Reggina, with a Di Capua goal, nearly securing a win. The team struggled to secure victories, tying four consecutive games: 0–0 against Noto, Gelbison, and Due Torri, and 1–1 away against Aversa Normanna. After a rest week, they lost 3–2 away to Roccella. Their first win since 13 December 2015 (1–0 vs. Scordia) came on 21 February, with a 1–0 victory over Leonfortese, thanks to Ianniello. However, the team couldn’t regain their first-half form, drawing 0–0 in the derby against Cavese and against Vigor Lamezia at home, before losing 1–0 to Rende in the 31st matchday.

From the Rende loss to the season’s end, Sarnese managed only two more wins: a 2–0 victory over Vibonese with a Savarese brace and a 2–1 win in the final matchday against Palmese, with Di Palma scoring twice. In this game, Fontanarosa, Savarese, Ianniello, and Di Capua were honored for reaching 100 appearances for the maroons. With 10 wins, 17 draws, and 9 losses, Sarnese finished their second Serie D season in ninth place in Group I, securing another year in the division.

=== 2016–17: Safety via play-outs ===
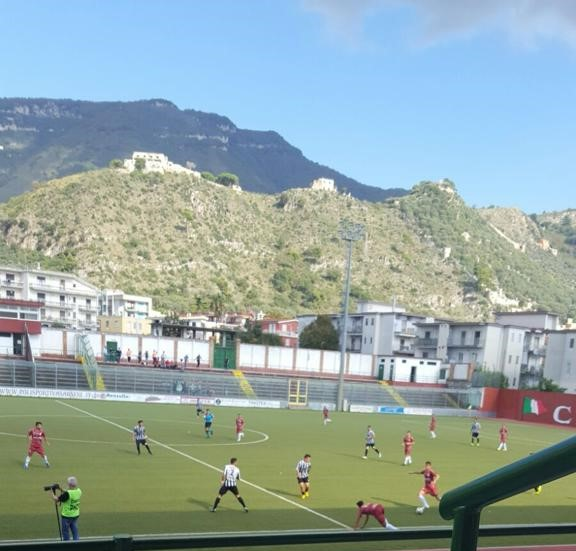
The maroons face Sicula Leonzio in the 2016–17 Serie D

In their third consecutive Serie D season, for 2016–17, with Gianluca Esposito again as manager, Sarnese were placed in Group I. After an unsuccessful social media appeal by president Origo to sign striker Mario Balotelli, the season began poorly with a 1–0 loss to Nocerina in the first round of the 2016–17 Coppa Italia Serie D. The league campaign also started slowly, with just two points from two 1–1 draws in the first four matchdays: one away against Igea Virtus and one at home against Rende. Their first win came in the fifth matchday, a 1–0 home victory over Sancataldese, with a Figliolia penalty. A 1–1 draw followed away against Aversa Normanna, despite playing with nine men after two red cards.

With only six points from six games, a 2–1 home loss to Sicula Leonzio in the seventh matchday ended Sarnese’s 23-game home unbeaten streak (11 wins, 12 draws) dating back to 2 April 2015, against Taranto. Crucial home wins followed in the ninth and eleventh matchdays, moving Sarnese away from the relegation zone: a 2–0 victory over Due Torri with goals from Elefante and Di Finizio and a 2–1 win over Castrovillari, with goals from Di Finizio and Talia. However, inconsistent results followed, with home losses to Roccella (1–0) and Cavese (2–0). The first half of the season ended with a 1–1 draw against Gela, played behind closed doors in Sarno.

The second half of the season started poorly with a 2–1 loss to Igea Virtus, followed by nine winless games (three draws, six losses), including defeats to Palmese (1–0), Sicula Leonzio (4–1), and Turris (1–0). With four games left, a crucial 2–1 home win over Frattese, with goals from Cacciottolo and Calemme, bolstered their chances of avoiding relegation. However, a 1–0 home loss to Gela in the final matchday left Sarnese in 15th place in Group I with 32 points, tied with Castrovillari but 10 points behind 13th-placed Sancataldese. League rules mandated a play-off to determine direct relegation for teams eight or more points behind the 13th-placed team. In the play-off in Potenza, Sarnese drew 1–1 with Castrovillari after regular time, winning 4–1 on penalties. They secured their safety with a 1–0 away win over Roccella in the decisive play-out, with a goal from Della Monica.

=== 2017–18: Avoiding relegation on the last day ===
After avoiding relegation, Sarnese was placed in Group H for the 2017–18 season. Led by new manager Valerio Gazzaneo, the maroons started strongly, earning three wins and a draw in the first four matchdays: a 2–1 away win over Nardò, a 2–2 home draw against Gravina, a 3–2 away win at Stadio Iacovone against Taranto, and a 5–0 home win over Molfetta. The fifth matchday brought their first loss, a 3–0 defeat away to Cavese.

Sarnese then drew three games against Gragnano, Turris, and Manfredonia, followed by four consecutive losses. During the 3–3 draw against Turris, a Turris midfielder was sent off in the 21st minute of the second half for an obscene gesture toward Sarnese fans after a teammate’s goal. After a home loss to Aversa Normanna, Gazzaneo resigned live on television, citing organizational difficulties. Carmelo Condemi took over, but results remained poor, with a loss and two draws in his first three games. Sarnese ended an 11-game winless streak with a 1–0 away win over AZ Picerno, with a goal from Salvatore Elefante, followed by a 3–2 home win over Francavilla, ending the first half of the season in ninth place with 21 points, safely in mid-table.

The second half of the season began with two draws and three losses in the first five games. In February 2018, Sarnese received a two-point penalty for failing to pay players Giuseppe Savarese and Fernando Di Capua, along with a fine and a four-month ban for president Origo. Despite this, the team fought for safety, securing key away wins: 2–0 against Gragnano and a dramatic 5–4 against Manfredonia. In April 2018, the squad was rocked by the arrest of captain Angelo Nasto. Nevertheless, Sarnese secured safety, finishing 11th and avoiding play-outs with a 3–2 away win over Francavilla on the final day.

=== 2018–19: Relegation and dissolution ===
In the summer of 2018, president Francesco Origo, who had led the club since 2013, decided to step away from football, initiating negotiations to sell the club. The sporting title remained with Origo, who passed the presidency to Sarno native Emilio Diodati, a club member for two years.

In the 2018–19 season, Polisportiva Sarnese made history in Sarno by competing in the top amateur league for a fifth consecutive year, a first for any Sarno team in Serie D. Placed again in Group H, the team was managed by Pompilio Cusano. The season saw three managerial changes: in January 2019, Cusano was sacked, and Massimo Agovino was announced as his replacement, but Agovino declined after one training session to join Giugliano. Alfonso Pepe took over, guiding Sarnese to 14th place, forcing them into the play-outs. In the relegation battle against Nola, Sarnese lost 3–1, returning to Eccellenza after five years. Following the team's relegation to Eccellenza, the club decided not to apply for reinstatement, and the sporting title was put up for sale. However, the failure to find a buyer led to the club being handed over to the mayor of Sarno, followed by the club's disappearance from football competitions.

=== Revival in Promozione: 2019–2023 ===
In July 2019, the sporting title was acquired by a Promozione club, ASD Picciola, which decided to play its matches in Sarno. The team enrolled in the Promozione championship for the 2019–2020 season, finishing eighth in Group D. In 2020, the club changed its name to A.S.D. F.C. Sarnese 1926 and registered again for the Promozione championship in the 2020–2021 season, but the competition was not held due to the COVID-19 pandemic in Italy. In the following season, 2021–2022, the team competed again in the championship, placed in Group E of Promozione Campania, finishing third, led largely by the goals of striker Francesco Vitale, who scored 27 goals across the league and cup competitions. This third-place finish allowed them to qualify for the first phase of the play-offs for Eccellenza. The maroons defeated Pro Sangiorgese 1–0 in extra time in the first round but failed to advance past a 0–0 draw against Centro Storico Salerno in the next round, being eliminated due to their opponent's better league position. In the 2022–2023 season, placed in Group D of Promozione Campania, the team finished tenth, maintaining their position in the division but never seriously contending for promotion.

=== The third Pappacena era ===
==== 2023–24: Eccellenza and Coppa Italia Campania double ====
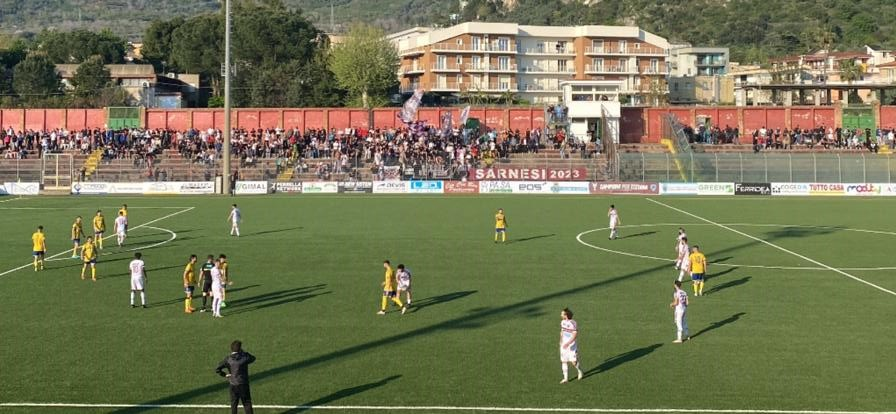
Sarnese, in white, during the 2023-2024 Eccellenza Campania match against Scafatese

In the summer of 2023, local entrepreneur and former two-time president of the club, Aniello Pappacena, became president once again. The new management acquired the sporting title of Polisportiva Lioni, changed the name to A.S.D. Sarnese 1926, and enrolled in the 2023-2024 Eccellenza Campania championship, being placed in Group B. The maroons were considered among the favorites to win the group, with Carmine Turco appointed as head coach and experienced players signed, including striker Davide Evacuo, the previous season's top scorer in Eccellenza with 26 goals, Ghanaian player David Nana Yeboah Johnson, Sarno native defender Roberto Vitolo, Argentine winger Franco Padin, and midfielder Nicolò Corticchia, formerly of Juventus's youth team. The team started the season reasonably well, but after a 2–1 defeat to Giffoni Sei Casali in the sixth matchday, the management sacked head coach Carmine Turco and appointed Egidio Pirozzi, a former coach of the maroons, to take over. Sarnese were crowned winter champions in their Eccellenza group, but in January, despite leading the group and reaching the Coppa Italia Dilettanti Campania final, coach Pirozzi was sacked. The team was then led by Francesco Farina.

On 31 January 2024, Sarnese won the Coppa Italia Dilettanti Campania for the first time in their history, defeating Puteolana 1–0 in extra time in the final, played at the Stadio Partenio in Avellino, with a goal by striker Davide Evacuo. The team earned a spot in the Coppa Italia Dilettanti, placed in Group G alongside the Lucanian team Santarcangiolese and the Apulian team Manduria. In the first match, Sarnese drew 1–1 against Manduria in Sarno. Despite a 2–1 victory against Santarcangiolese in the second match, the team was eliminated from the competition due to goal difference in favor of Manduria.

In the league, the maroons maintained their lead at the top of the table during the second half of the season. In the first match of 2024, played on Epiphany against second-placed Castel San Giorgio, Sarnese secured a 2–2 draw with a brace from Yeboah. They then achieved a resounding 4–0 victory over Agropoli, with goals from Ciampi, Pellecchia, Dentice, and Cassandro, followed by a 2–0 win against Giffoni Sei Casali, with goals from Padin and Sbordone, in the match following their Coppa Italia Dilettanti Campania victory. A 2–0 away win against Costa d'Amalfi, with goals from Yeboah and Padin, ensured that Farina’s team held a firm lead in Group B until the Easter break, with only four matches remaining and a nine-point advantage over the second-placed team. After the break, the maroons secured a crucial 1–0 "derby" victory against Scafatese with a goal from Franco Padin in the 83rd minute, bringing them closer to promotion. With three matches remaining, Sarnese needed just one point to secure the championship. In the 31st and third-to-last matchday, a 0–0 draw away against Virtus Avellino secured the point needed for mathematical promotion to Serie D and confirmed Sarnese as Group B champions of 2023-2024 Eccellenza Campania. This marked their return to the national fourth tier after a five-year absence.

=== 2024–25: Return to Serie D ===
In preparation for their return to Serie D in the summer of 2024, the Sarnese club completely overhauled the team, replacing both the head coach and sporting director and not retaining any players from the previous season’s squad. Riccardo Bolzan was appointed as the new sporting director, while former Paganese coach Massimo Agovino was chosen to lead the maroons. During the summer transfer window, the club invested in several young players, some from the youth academies of Serie A teams, such as Habtamu Gasti, Alessio Piantedosi, and goalkeeper Bryan Bonucci, as well as experienced players for the division, including Argentine striker Laurato Fernandez and defender Rodrigo Callegari, Moroccan winger Soufiane Lagzir, defender Enrico Pezzi, with over 300 appearances in Serie B and Serie C, and striker Mattia Montini, born in 1992 and formerly of Roma's youth team.

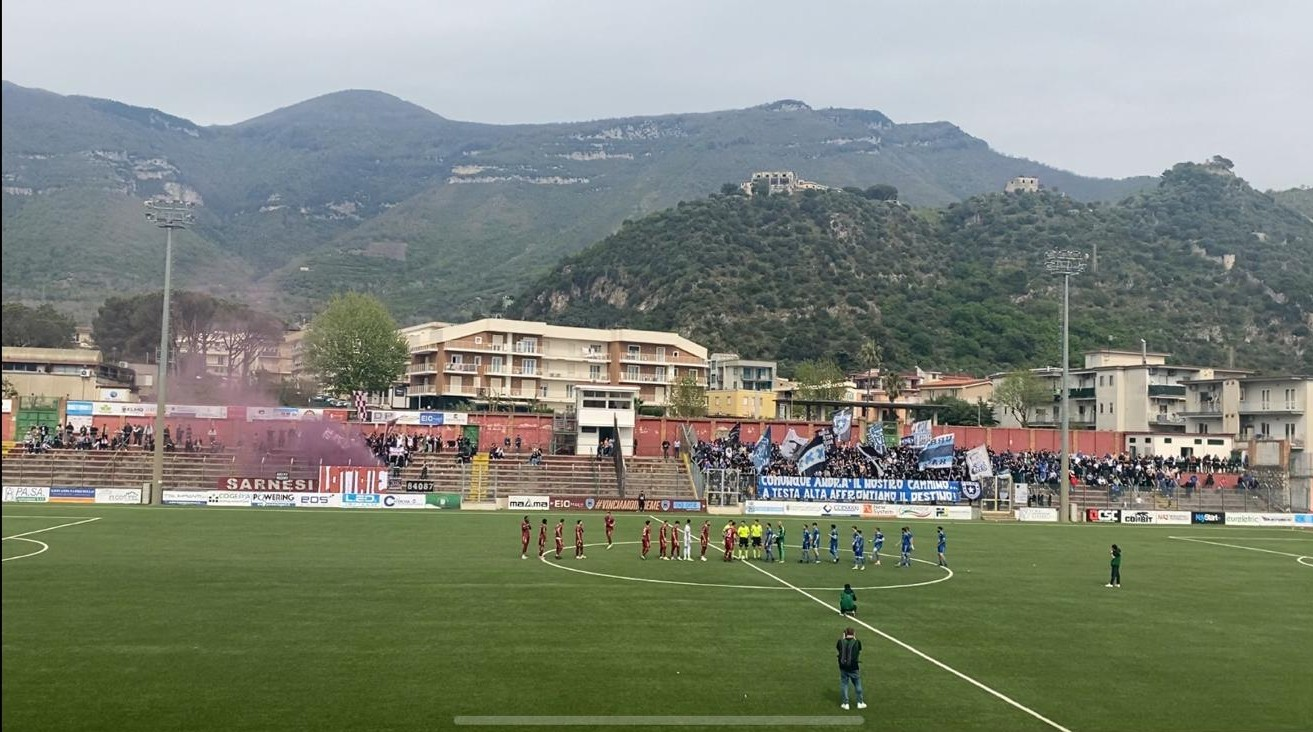
The maroons and Paganese before the Group G match of the 2024–25 Serie D season.

The season began with a 3–0 home victory in the preliminary round of the 2024-2025 Coppa Italia Serie D against Savoia, with goals from Uliano, Lagzir, and Iannone. However, their Coppa Italia campaign ended in the next round with a 2–1 defeat to Paganese. Agovino’s maroons were drawn in Group G for the 2024–25 Serie D season. Their league campaign started with a 1–0 away win against Cynthialbalonga, thanks to a penalty by Iannone. However, in the next five matches, the team recorded three draws and two defeats, leading to Agovino’s sacking and replacement by former Nocerina coach Giovanni Cavallaro. Under Cavallaro, the maroons achieved seven consecutive positive results, placing them four points from the top of the table by the 13th matchday. However, in December, Sarnese suffered a 1–0 defeat in two crucial Campania derbies, first against Paganese and then against Savoia, followed by a 2–0 loss to Costa Orientale Sarda at the Felice Squitieri before the Christmas break.

The second half of the season began with two consecutive victories for Sarnese: a 4–3 home win against Cynthialbalonga and a 2–0 away win against Terracina. However, despite these successes, a 3–2 defeat to league leaders Gelbison effectively ended their promotion hopes, leading to the sacking of Giovanni Cavallaro, who was replaced by Raffaele Novelli. The team, led by their third coach of the season, suffered a 3–0 home defeat to Puteolana in Sarno, definitively ending their promotion aspirations. Nevertheless, the team continued the season with strong results, including a 6–2 away win against Anzio with goals from Labriola, Lagzir, a brace from Fall, and De Nova, a 1–1 home draw against the eventual group winners Guidonia Montecelio, and a 1–0 home derby win against Paganese in the fourth-to-last matchday. The maroons finished Group G in third place with 62 points, recording 18 wins, 8 draws, and 8 losses.

== Timeline ==
Timeline of Sarnese 1926
- 1926 - Foundation of the club.
- 1926–1931 - Local activities.
- 1931–1932 - 2nd in Group A of Terza Divisione Campania.

3rd in the regional final group.

- 1932–1939 - Local activities.
- 1939–1942 - Activities interrupted due to World War II.
- 1942–1943 - ? in Group ? of Seconda Divisione Campania.
- 1943–1945 - Activities interrupted due to World War II.

- 1945–1946 - 3rd in Group A of Prima Divisione Campania.

2nd in Group E of Regional Semifinals.

- 1946–1947 - 5th in Group B of Prima Divisione Campania.
- 1947–1948 - ? in Group ? of Seconda Divisione Campania.
- 1948–1949 - ? in Group ? of Seconda Divisione Campania.
- 1949–1950 - ? in Group ? of Seconda Divisione Campania.
- 1950–1959 - Local activities.

Polisportiva Sarnese

- 1959–1960 - 1st in Group ? of Terza Categoria Campania.

Promoted to Seconda Categoria Campania.

- 1960–1961 - ? in Group ? of Seconda Categoria Campania.
- 1961–1962 - ? in Group ? of Seconda Categoria Campania.
- 1962–1963 - ? in Group ? of Seconda Categoria Campania.
- 1963–1964 - ? in Group ? of Seconda Categoria Campania.
- 1964–1965 - ? in Group ? of Seconda Categoria Campania.
- 1965–1966 - 1st in Group H of Seconda Categoria Campania.

Promoted to Prima Categoria Campania after promotion play-offs.

- 1966–1967 - 5th in Group C of Prima Categoria Campania.

Admitted to the new Promozione championship.

- 1967–1968 - 4th in Group B of Promozione Campania.
- 1968–1969 - 5th in Group B of Promozione Campania.
- 1969–1970 - 16th in Group B of Promozione Campania.

Relegated to Prima Categoria Campania.

S.C. Sarnese

- 1970–1971 - 1st in Group ? of Prima Categoria Campania.

Promoted to Promozione Campania.

- 1971–1972 - 7th in Group B of Promozione Campania.
- 1972–1973 - 11th in Group B of Promozione Campania.
- 1973–1974 - 16th in Group B of Promozione Campania.

Relegated to Prima Categoria Campania.

- 1974–1975 - ? in Group ? of Prima Categoria Campania.
- 1975–1976 - ? in Group ? of Prima Categoria Campania.

Promoted to Promozione Campania.

- 1976–1977 - 5th in Group B of Promozione Campania.
- 1977–1978 - 12th in Group C of Promozione Campania.
- 1978–1979 - 8th in Group C of Promozione Campania.
- 1979–1980 - 14th in Group C of Promozione Campania.

Relegated to Prima Categoria Campania, then reinstated in Promozione Campania.

- 1980–1981 - 6th in Group C of Promozione Campania.
- 1981–1982 - 2nd in Group C of Promozione Campania.
- 1982–1983 - 1st in Group C of Promozione Campania.

Promoted to Campionato Interregionale after promotion play-offs.

- 1983–1984 - 9th in Group H of Campionato Interregionale.

Participates in Coppa Italia Dilettanti.

- 1984–1985 - 11th in Group L of Campionato Interregionale.

Participates in Coppa Italia Dilettanti.

- 1985–1986 - 4th in Group I of Campionato Interregionale.

Round of 32 in Coppa Italia Dilettanti.

- 1986–1987 - 9th in Group I of Campionato Interregionale.

Participates in Coppa Italia Dilettanti.

- 1987–1988 - 2nd in Group I of Campionato Interregionale.

Loses promotion play-off.
Participates in Coppa Italia Dilettanti.

- 1988–1989 - 15th in Group M of Campionato Interregionale.

Relegated to Promozione after relegation play-off.
Participates in Coppa Italia Dilettanti.

- 1989–1990 - 7th in Group B of Promozione Campania.

Not registered for the following Promozione championship.

- 1990–1991 -
- 1991–1992 -
- 1992–1993 -
- 1993–1994 -
- 1994–1995 - 5th in Group ? of Prima Categoria Campania.
- 1995–1996 - 3rd in Group ? of Prima Categoria Campania.
- 1996–1997 - 2nd in Group ? of Prima Categoria Campania.

Promoted to Promozione Campania

- 1997–1998 - 7th in Group B of Promozione Campania.
- 1998–1999 - 4th in Group B of Promozione Campania.
- 1999–2000 - 11th in Group B of Promozione Campania.

S.C. Sarnese 1926

- 2000 - At the end of the season, adopts the name S.C. Sarnese 1926.
- 2000–2001 - 7th in Group D of Promozione Campania.
- 2001–2002 - 9th in Group D of Promozione Campania.
- 2002–2003 - 3rd in Group C of Promozione Campania.
- 2003–2004 - 2nd in Group C of Promozione Campania.
- 2004–2005 - 13th in Group B of Promozione Campania.
- 2005–2006 - 5th in Group B of Promozione Campania.
- 2006–2007 - 16th in Group B of Promozione Campania.

Relegated to Prima Categoria Campania, then reinstated in Promozione Campania.

- 2007–2008 - 2nd in Group C of Promozione Campania.
- 2008–2009 - 5th in Group C of Promozione Campania.
- 2009–2010 - 1st in Group C of Promozione Campania.

Promoted to Eccellenza Campania.

- 2010–2011 - 3rd in Group B of Eccellenza Campania.

Wins national play-offs.
Promoted to Serie D

- 2011–2012 - 2nd in Group H of Serie D.

Eliminated in play-offs.
Round of 64 Coppa Italia Serie D.

- 2012–2013 - 3rd in Group G of Serie D.

Declines play-offs.
Excluded from the following Serie D championship due to financial issues.
Preliminary round of Coppa Italia.
Round of 32 Coppa Italia Serie D.

Polisportiva Sarnese

- 2013 - The club is refounded as Polisportiva Sarnese and registered in Eccellenza with the sporting title of Real Trentinara.
- 2013–2014 - 2nd in Group B of Eccellenza Campania.

Wins national play-offs.
Promoted to Serie D

A.S.D. Polisportiva Sarnese

- 2014 - At the end of the season, adopts the name A.S.D. Polisportiva Sarnese.
- 2014–2015 - 7th in Group H of Serie D.

First round Coppa Italia Serie D.

S.S.D. Polisportiva Sarnese 1926

- 2015 - At the end of the season, changes name to S.S.D. Polisportiva Sarnese 1926 a.r.l..
- 2015–2016 - 9th in Group I of Serie D.

First round Coppa Italia Serie D.

- 2016–2017 - 15th in Group I of Serie D.

Avoids relegation after winning play-outs.
First round Coppa Italia Serie D.

- 2017–2018 - 11th in Group H of Serie D.

Preliminary round Coppa Italia Serie D.

- 2018–2019 - 14th in Group H of Serie D.

Preliminary round Coppa Italia Serie D.
Relegated to Eccellenza after losing play-outs.
Not registered for the following Eccellenza championship.

- 2019 - A new club restarts in Promozione with the sporting title of A.S.D. Picciola.
- 2019–2020 - 8th in Group D of Promozione Campania.

A.S.D. F.C. Sarnese 1926

- 2020 - Picciola adopts the name A.S.D. F.C. Sarnese 1926.
- 2020–2021 - Competes in Promozione Campania. Tournament not held due to COVID-19.
- 2021–2022 - 3rd in Group E of Promozione Campania.
- 2022–2023 - 10th in Group D of Promozione Campania.

A.S.D. Sarnese 1926

- 2023 - Acquires the Eccellenza sporting title of Polisportiva Lioni and changes name to A.S.D. Sarnese 1926.
- 2023–2024 - 1st in Group B of Eccellenza Campania.

Promoted to Serie D
Wins the Coppa Italia Dilettanti Campania (1st title)
Group stage elimination in Coppa Italia Dilettanti

- 2024–2025 - 3rd in Group G of Serie D.

First round Coppa Italia Serie D

- 2025–2026 - ? in Group H of Serie D.

== Colors and symbols ==
=== Colors ===
The color that has historically represented and accompanied Sarnese throughout its seasons is maroon, which remains the club's official color today. Several hypotheses exist regarding the choice of this color, with the most plausible being the adoption of the colors of Salernitana.

After using maroon during the early decades of its sporting activity, one of the first post-war Sarnese kits was black and blue, while another was entirely white with a monarchic star on the chest. There were also green kits as a tribute to the Avellino team.

When Sarnese was refounded in the late 1950s, the team played in black-and-white kits, inspired by the popularity of Juventus, which dominated Italian football at the time. The arrival of coach Checco Mazzetti in the early 1960s saw maroon return as the team's main color.

1926–45 Home	1926–45 Away	Mid-1940s	Mid-1940s	Early 1960s	1960s Home
1960s Away	1960s Away	1970s Home	1980s Home	1980s Home	1980s Away

=== Crest ===
The club’s crest is a shield-shaped emblem with a brown border. Inside the shield, on a light blue background, a brown hippogriff—the symbol of the team and the city of Sarno—is depicted with spread wings and one paw raised, holding a football. Above the hippogriff, in the upper part of the shield, the inscription "SARNESE 1926" is written in red capital letters. The hippogriff stands on three mountains, from which three springs emerge, forming a river, reflecting the city’s crest, which features the three main springs—Santa Maria della Foce, Draconteo (Rio Palazzo), and Santa Marina—that form the Sarno River.

=== Anthem ===
The team’s anthem is the song Olè Olè Olè, Forza Sarnese, composed by Nino Alberto in the 1980s, inspired by a chant sung by fans during the first presidency of Pappacena.

== Facilities ==
=== Stadium ===
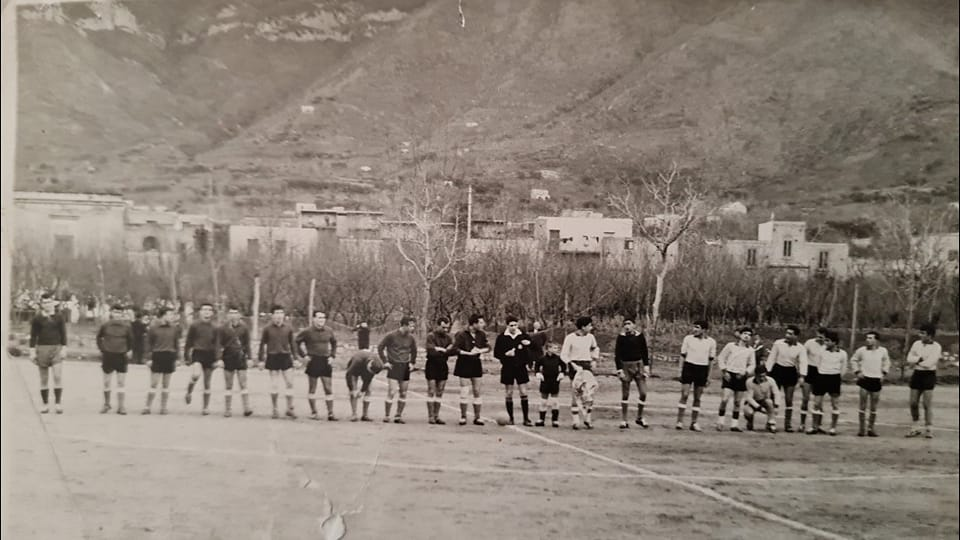
Sarnese vs Savoia, friendly match in 1964 played at the Campo del Lagno

The team originally played its home matches on various makeshift fields throughout the municipality or at fields belonging to some of the city’s parishes. The first proper playing field was a dirt pitch located in the center of Sarno along Corso Amendola (formerly known as Corso Risorgimento), where Piazza V Maggio now stands. Sarnese played on this field until the post-war period, when it fell into disuse due to war-related debris and failure to meet federation standards for hosting federal championship matches, becoming the city’s market square.

When the revival of Sarnese was initiated in the late 1950s, a group of young people, who later contributed to the club’s rebirth, cleared an area known as "Lagno" of weeds, transforming it into a fenced playing field with an embankment for stands. This small field, with spectators crowded around the sidelines and players changing in a makeshift shack nearby, became the home stadium for Sarnese matches until the construction of the municipal stadium, entering the collective memory of generations of Sarno residents.

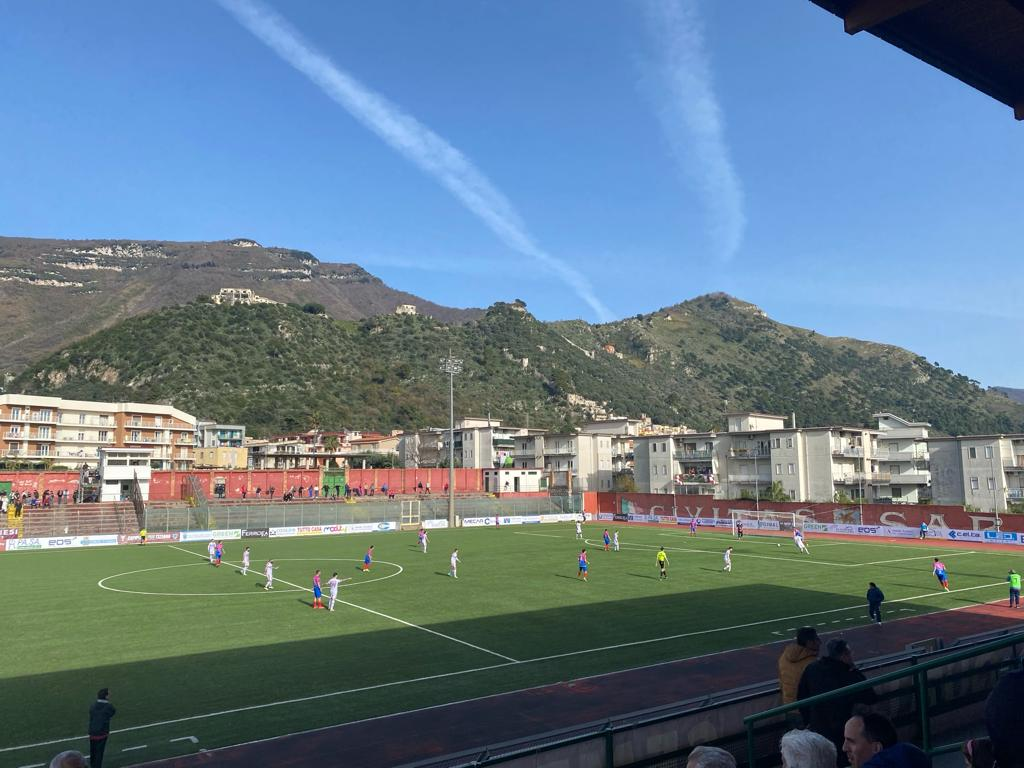
Inside the Felice Squitieri during a Sarnese match

From the early 1960s, during the presidency of Esposito, significant pressure was placed on then-mayor Capua to provide the city of Sarno with a proper sports facility. Construction began on a municipal stadium to host Sarnese matches. After several years, the facility was completed and named "Felice Squitieri" in memory of a Sarno aviator who died during World War II. Inaugurated with a friendly match between Roma and Salernitana, the stadium consists of a stands sector with unnumbered bleachers and a grandstand sector with a maximum seating capacity of 3,246. The facility also includes an athletics track and is equipped with floodlights. The pitch measures 100 meters in length and 60 meters in width.

The stadium underwent multiple maintenance and renovation works in the 2010s. In 2016, the grandstand was modernized with the addition of a roof, a press room, a refreshment area, and a gym. For the 2019 Summer Universiade held in Campania, the stadium was among the venues used, leading to further renovations, including upgrades to the changing rooms, gym, and bar, as well as the installation of a new artificial turf surface to replace the existing one.

== Club ==
=== Names ===
==== Timeline of the club's names ====
- 1926–1959: Unione Sportiva Sarnese
- 1959–1969: Polisportiva Sarnese
- 1969–2000: Società Calcio Sarnese
- 2000–2013: Società Calcio Sarnese 1926
- 2013–2014: Polisportiva Sarnese
- 2014–2015: Associazione Sportiva Dilettantistica Polisportiva Sarnese
- 2015–2019: Società Sportiva Dilettantistica Polisportiva Sarnese 1926
- 2020–2023: Associazione Sportiva Dilettantistica Football Club Sarnese 1926
- 2023–present: Associazione Sportiva Dilettantistica Sarnese 1926

=== Sponsors ===
==== Timeline of technical sponsors ====
- 1926–2008 ...
- 2008–2011: Macron
- 2011–2013: Devis
- 2013–2015: Legea
- 2015–2024: Devis
- 2024–present: Magma Sport

==== Timeline of official sponsors ====
- 1926–1981 ...
- 1981–1985: La Metal Sarno
- 1985–1990: Mobili Salerno
- 1990–2010 ...
- 2010–2013: SO.I.GE.A
- 2013–2014: none
- 2014–2015: SO.I.GE.A
- 2015–2017: Centro LARS Renzullo
- 2017–2018: Monteleone Dolci
- 2018–2019: Zurich Insurance Sarno
- 2019–2020 ...
- 2021–present: SO.I.GE.A

=== Club structure ===
Role	Name
President	(Italy) Aniello Pappacena
Vice-President	(Italy) Italo Canzolino
Vice-President	(Italy) Giovanni Pappacena
Council Secretary	(Italy) Carmelo Pappacena
Council Member	(Italy) Giovanni D'Auria
Council Member	(Italy) Pietro De Rosa
Council Member	(Italy) Francesco Esposito
Council Member	(Italy) Giuseppe Pappacena
Council Member	(Italy) Antonio Piscoquito
Administrative and Financial Manager	(Italy) Brigida Corrado
Youth Sector Manager	(Italy) Emilio Diodati
Communications Manager	(Italy) Gianfranco Collaro

== Players ==
=== Current squad ===
As of 27 October 2026

Note: Flags indicate national team as defined under FIFA eligibility rules; some limited exceptions apply. Players may hold more than one non-FIFA nationality.

No.	Pos.	Nation	Player
1	GK	ITA	Andrea Petrone
2	DF	ITA	Donato Solaro
3	DF	ARG	Santiago Velásquez
4	MF	ITA	Giuseppe La Monica
5	DF	ITA	Giulio Carotenuto
6	MF	SLO	Valent Savor
7	FW	ITA	Mattia Rossetti
8	MF	ITA	Raffaele Virgilio
9	FW	SRB	Marko Rajković
10	FW	ITA	Michele Silvestro
11	DF	ITA	Daniele Lia

No.	Pos.	Nation	Player
13	MF	ITA	Andrea Bottalico
14	MF	BRA	Gladestony
17	DF	ITA	Andrea Puca
18	FW	ITA	Michele Volpe
19	DF	ITA	Alessandro Amato
20	MF	ITA	Pietro Santarpia
21	FW	ITA	Antonio Ferrara
22	GK	ITA	Luca Pizzella
23	DF	ITA	Tommaso Mazzei
26	FW	ITA	Simone Addessi

No.	Pos.	Nation	Player
30	FW	ITA	Marcello Maisto
33	GK	ITA	Pierpaolo Perina
44	DF	ITA	Salvatore Codraro
72	DF	ITA	Federico Malvestuto
77	DF	ITA	Niccolò Tiberti
93	FW	ITA	Blue Mamona
–	FW	BAN	Debajit Sarkar

== Managers ==
- 1926–1945 ...
- 1945–1947 (Italy) Mazzei
- 1947–1950 (Italy) Sozzi
- 1950–1960 ...
- 1959–1960 (Italy) Pasquale Dato
- 1960–1963 (Italy) Carmando
- 1963–1966 (Italy) Francesco Mazzetti
- 1966–1969 (Italy) Felice Baiardini
- 1969–1970 (Italy) Bosco
- 1970–1971 (Italy) Brandi
- 1971–1972 (Italy) Sgambati
- 1972–1973 (Italy) Di Caprio
- 1973–1975 ...
- 1975–1979 (Italy) Carlo Vignapiano
- 1979–1981 (Italy) Mario Magagnotti
- 1981–1982 (Italy) Sgambati
- 1982–1983 (Italy) Gaetano Vergazzola
- 1983 (Italy) Giovanni Simonelli
- 1983–1984 (Italy) Zanola
- 1984–1986 (Italy) Lucchetti
- 1986–1988 (Italy) Benito Montalto
- 1988–1989 (Italy) Cresci
- 1989–2002 ...
- 2002–2003 (Italy) Luigi Squillante
- 2003–2004 (Italy) Alfonso Pepe
- 2004–2006 (Italy) Gennaro Ferrigno
- 2006–2007 (Italy) Vincenzo Granata
  (Italy) Vincenzo Siani
  (Italy) Bonaiuto
- 2006–2007 (Italy) Vincenzo Siani
- 2007–2008 (Italy) Vincenzo Siani (1st–7th)
  (Italy) Pasquale Lucignano (8th–30th)
- 2008–2009 (Italy) Ambrosino
  (Italy) Papa
- 2009–2010 (Italy) Giovanni Renna
- 2010–2011 (Italy) Giovanni Renna
  (Italy) Egidio Pirozzi
- 2011–2012 (Italy) Egidio Pirozzi
- 2012–2013 (Italy) Egidio Pirozzi (1st–10th)
  (Italy) Giuseppe Palumbo (11th–22nd)
  (Italy) Gianfranco Balzano (23rd–34th)
- 2013–2014 (Italy) Pasquale Vitter
- 2014–2015 (Italy) Pasquale Vitter (1st–30th)
  (Italy) Gianluca Esposito – (Italy) Ciro Ianniello (31st–34th)
- 2015–2017 (Italy) Gianluca Esposito
- 2017–2018 (Italy) Valerio Gazzaneo
  (Italy) Carmelo Condemi
- 2018–2019 (Italy) Pompilio Cusano
  (Italy) Massimo Agovino
  (Italy) Alfonso Pepe
- 2019–2020 (Italy) Pasquale Vitter
- 2020–2021 (Italy) Carmine Marotta
- 2021–2022 (Italy) Alfonso Trapani
- 2022–2023 (Italy) Gerardo Viscido
- 2023–2024 (Italy) Carmine Turco (1st–6th)
  (Italy) Egidio Pirozzi (7th–18th)
  (Italy) Francesco Farina (19th–34th)
- 2024–2025 (Italy) Massimo Agovino (1st–6th)
  (Italy) Giovanni Cavallaro (7th–20th)
  (Italy) Raffaele Novelli (21st–34th)
- 2025– (Italy) Teore Grimaldi (1st–)

== Presidents ==
- 1926–1936 ...
- 1936–1942 (Kingdom of Italy) Avv. De Vivo
- 1942–1943 (Kingdom of Italy) Andrea Vagito
- 1943–1945 ...
- 1945–1950 (Italy) Michele De Filippo
- 1950–1959 ...
- 1959–1961 (Italy) Delio Squitieri
- 1961–1969 (Italy) Mario Esposito
- 1969 (Italy) Ciro Rainone
- 1969–1970 (Italy) Minerva
- 1970–1979 (Italy) Michele Pagliarulo
- 1980–1989 (Italy) Aniello Pappacena
- 1989–2008 (Italy) Don Ciro Criscuolo
- 2008–2013 (Italy) Aniello Pappacena
- 2013–2018 (Italy) Francesco Origo
- 2018–2019 (Italy) Emilio Diodati
- 2019–2023 (Italy) Maria Adiletta
- 2023– (Italy) Aniello Pappacena

== Honours ==
=== Regional competitions ===
- Eccellenza

2023–2024 (Group B)

- Promozione Campania: 2

1982–1983 (Group C), 2009–2010 (Group C)

- Coppa Italia Dilettanti Campania

2023–2024

- Prima Categoria Campania: 1

1970–1971

- Seconda Categoria Campania: 1

1965–1966 (Group H)

- Terza Categoria Campania: 1

1959–1960

=== Other placements ===
- Campionato Interregionale

Second place: 1987–1988 (Group I)

- Serie D

Second place: 2011–2012 (Group H)
Third place: 2012–2013, 2024–2025 (Group G)

- Eccellenza

Second place: 2013–2014 (Group B)
Third place: 2010–2011 (Group B)

- Promozione Campania

Second place: 1981–1982 (Group C), 2003–2004 (Group C), 2007–2008 (Group C)
Third place: 2002–2003 (Group C), 2021–2022 (Group E)

== Statistics and records ==
=== Participation in national championships ===
Level	Division	Participations	Debut	Last season	Total
4th	Serie D	7	2014–2015	2025–2026	9
4th	Prima Divisione	2	1945–1946	1946–1947	9
5th	Campionato Interregionale	6	1983–1984	1988–1989	8
5th	Serie D	2	2011–2012	2012–2013	8

=== Participation in regional championships ===
Level	Division	Participations	Debut	Last season	Total
I	Promozione	14	1967–1968	1989–1990	18
I	Prima Categoria	1	1966–1967		18
I	Eccellenza	3	2010–2011	2023–2024	18
II	Promozione	18	1997–1998	2022–2023	25
II	Prima Categoria	6	1970–1971	1996–1997	25
II	Seconda Categoria	10	1942–1943	1965–1966	25
III	Terza Categoria	2	1931–1932	1959–1960	2

=== Participation in cups ===
Competition	Participations	Debut	Last season	Total
Coppa Italia	1	2012–2013		33
Coppa Italia Serie D	9	2011–2012	2025–2026	33
Coppa Italia Dilettanti	7	1983–1984	2023–2024	33
Coppa Italia Dilettanti Campania	16	1997–1998	2023–2024	33

== Supporters ==
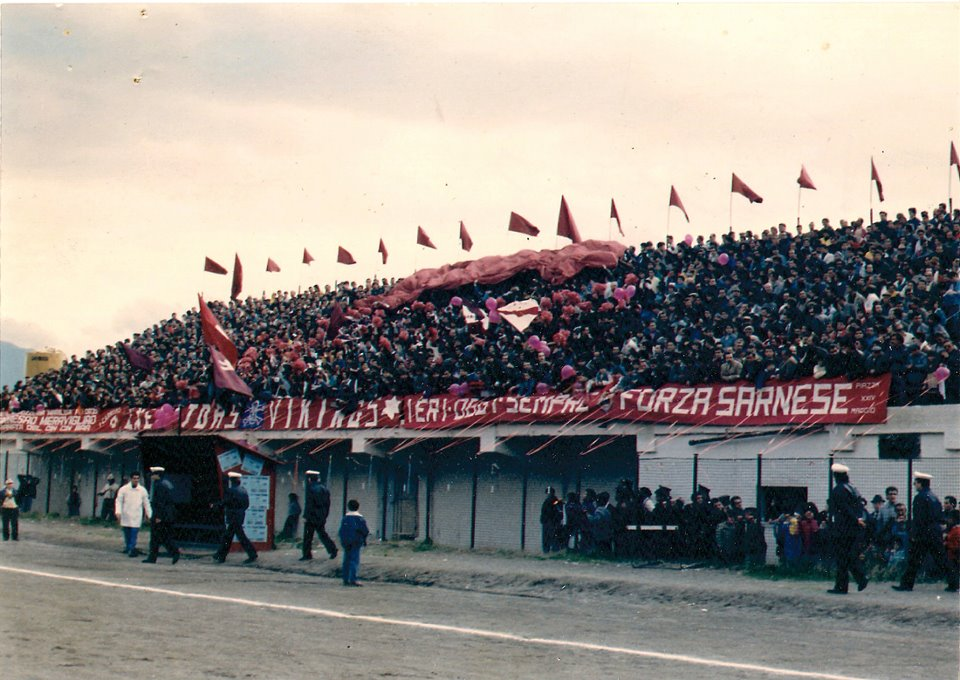
Sarnese supporters during the Sarnese-Battipagliese match in 1987–88, Campionato Interregionale

Support for the team from the local community has been consistent since its early participation in regional championships, with Sarnese, like most local sports entities, representing the entire community. In the 1980s, when the team achieved promotion to the Campionato Interregionale for the first time, the first organized supporter groups emerged, including the long-standing and active Executors Viking, Centro Storico, Fedelissimi, and Vecchia Guardia, with the latter three still present in the stands of the Sarnese stadium. However, following the transfer of the sporting title in 1990, the 1990s were challenging years for Sarnese supporters. Between the late 1990s and early 2000s, with the team competing in Prima Categoria and Promozione, the Sarnese fanbase was divided due to the presence of another team in Sarno, Ippogrifo Sarno, which competed in Eccellenza and for two seasons in Serie D. This division peaked during the 2010-2011 Eccellenza Campania season, when both Sarnese teams were in the same group, facing each other in five city "derbies" across the league, cup, and playoffs.

With Sarnese’s return to Serie D in 2011 and the near-simultaneous dissolution of Ippogrifo Sarno, the Sarnese fanbase reunited in support of the team, leading to the formation of new organized supporter groups. Throughout the early 2000s and part of the 2010s, the organized Sarnese supporters were primarily represented by the Nucleo Marconi group, founded in 2003 and active until the early 2010s, and the Ultras Sarno group. In the 2010s, particularly when the team was competing in Serie D, the Brigata Granata (active from 2015 to 2019) and the South Boys (formed in 2014 and active for a few years) represented the organized supporters. Concurrently with the team’s return to Eccellenza in 2023, following the bankruptcy of 2019, the organized supporters are now represented by the Ultras Sarnesi and Garnet Brothers groups, both founded in 2023, who occupy the stands in the distinguished sector of the Felice Squitieri stadium.

=== Twinnings and friendships ===
One of the main twinnings maintained by Sarnese supporters is with the ultras groups of Ebolitana, a relationship that began before 2010. This bond is supported by a shared rivalry with Battipagliese, a historic rival of both Sarnese and Ebolitana fans. The close relationship between the two supporter groups has been reaffirmed over the years through mutual attendance at each other’s matches. Another twinning is with the fans of AZ Picerno, a relationship that began during the Eccellenza playoff match that returned the Campanian team to Serie D in 2014.

Since the mid-2010s, a twinning has also developed with the supporters of the Avellino-based team Audax Cervinara, which has been reaffirmed over the years during matches between the two teams. There are also friendships with the ultras groups of Savoia. In the past, good relations also existed with the supporters of A.S.C.D. Saviano 1960, Gragnano, and Angri.

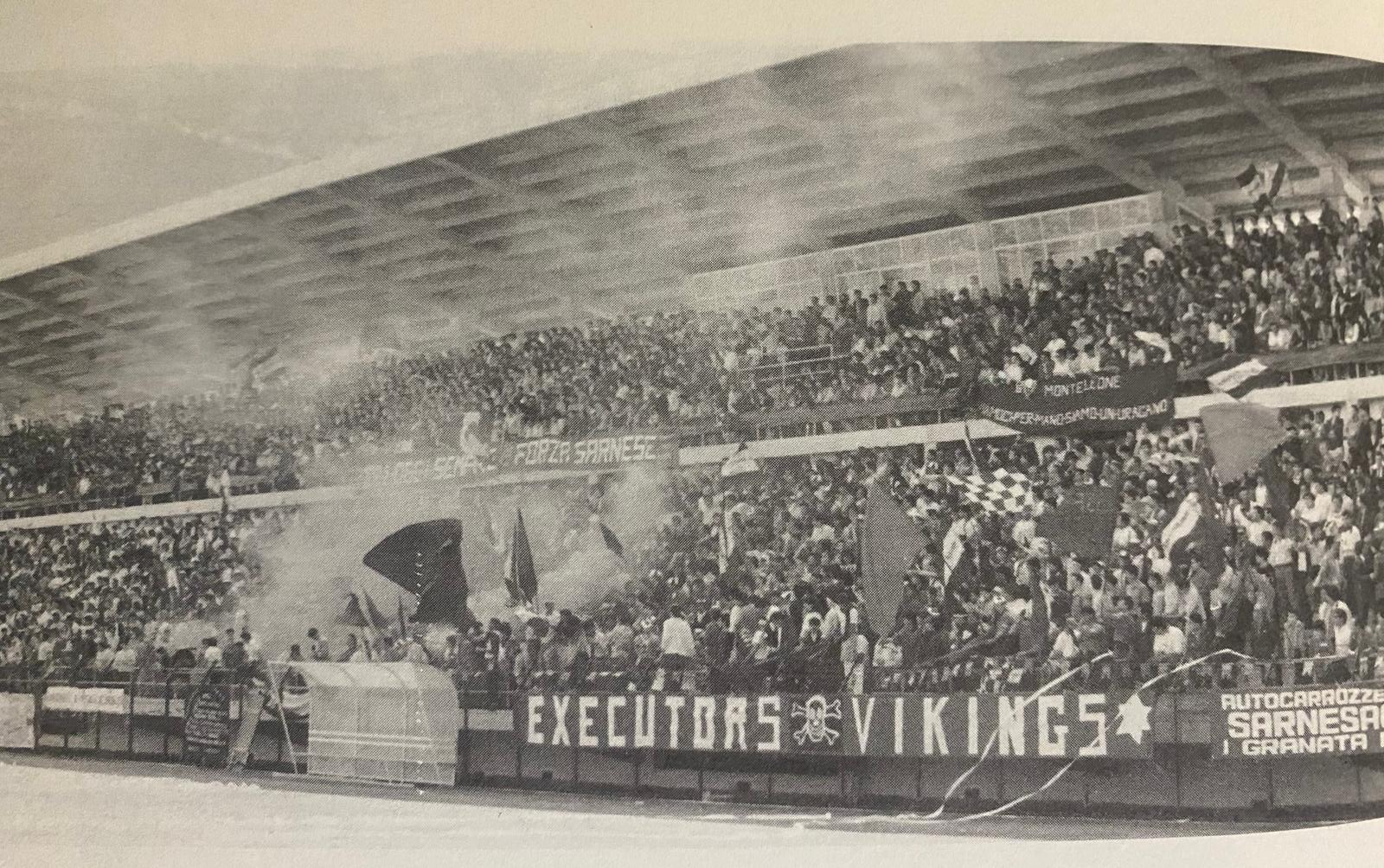
Sarnese supporters at the Menti stadium in 1988 during the playoff against Battipagliese

There is also a special relationship with the supporters of Salernitana, based primarily on mutual respect, stemming from the events of 5 May 1998. The Sarno landslide held significant meaning for the Salernitana fanbase as well. When Salernitana was promoted to Serie A that same year on 10 May, just five days after the tragedy, at the Stadio Arechi, following the match between Salernitana and Venezia, there were 30 minutes of complete silence, with a banner displayed by the Salernitana Curva Sud: "Unfortunately, life goes on." At the final whistle, the city of Salerno chose not to celebrate the promotion to the top tier on the city streets but only within the stadium, an act of respect widely reported across Italy and never forgotten by the Sarnese community.

Twinnings

- Ebolitana
- Audax Cervinara

Friendships

- AZ Picerno
- Angri
- Gragnano
- Savoia
- Saviano

=== Rivalries ===
Among the main rivalries is that with the ultras of Battipagliese. The two teams have faced each other multiple times throughout their history, but the rivalry was ignited by the playoff match in the 1987–88 season for promotion to Serie C2. Over the years, there have been several incidents of clashes between the two supporter groups, both in 2006 and during the 2009-2010 Eccellenza Campania match played in Sarno. Despite a ban on ticket sales for away fans of Battipagliese, their ultras managed to enter the stadium, leading to stone-throwing from outside the stadium toward the visitors and clashes with law enforcement.

Another significant rivalry is with the ultras of Sant'Antonio Abate, reinforced by the twinning of Sarnese fans with those of Ebolitana, who are also rivals of Sant'Antonio. Over the years, the teams have often been placed in the same leagues, and on several occasions, clashes between the supporter groups have occurred. In 2006, a large group of Sarnese fans traveled to Sant'Antonio Abate for a cup match. Trouble began toward the end of the first half when Abatese supporters, positioned in the curva, threw a firecracker that exploded in the Sarnese section, igniting tensions. At the start of the second half, Sarnese supporters clashed heavily with the carabinieri, who were forced to intervene as the Sarnese ultras attempted to climb over the barrier separating them from the Abatese curva. The disturbances continued throughout the second half, with the referee suspending the match for a few minutes. After the game, clashes moved outside the stadium, where the two groups engaged in stone-throwing and repeated confrontations with law enforcement. During these clashes, a small group of Sarnese fans climbed a barrier, reached the Abatese curva, stole a banner, tore it, and set it on fire.

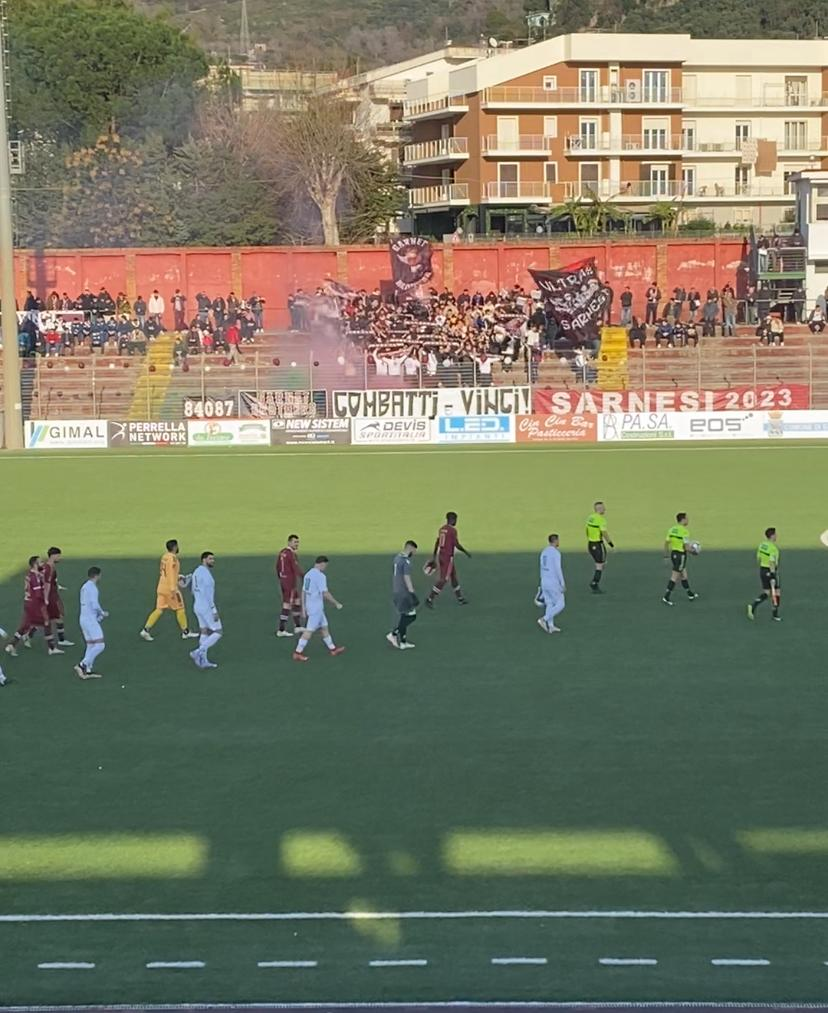
Sarnese organized supporters during the 2023–24 Coppa Italia Campania semifinal

Rivalries are also maintained with the supporters of Agropoli, both due to their twinning with the fans of Sant'Antonio Abate and the simultaneous rivalry between Agropoli and Ebolitana, a team twinned with Sarnese.

In October 2012, during a Serie D match between Sarnese and Isola Liri, a dispute between some Sarnese fans and a player from the opposing team led to violent clashes outside the stadium after the match, resulting in injuries to two law enforcement officers.

During the 2023-2024 Eccellenza Campania match between Sarnese and Scafatese, played in Sarno with a significant number of Scafatese supporters present, the referee was forced to suspend the match for a few minutes in the first half due to objects being thrown between the two supporter groups. At the end of the match, a group of Sarnese fans attempted to attack around fifteen cars carrying Scafatese fans as they were returning to Scafati under police escort, throwing stones. The intervention of law enforcement prevented worse outcomes, stopping the Scafatese fans, who had gotten out of their vehicles to retaliate, from coming into contact with the Sarnese fans.

Rivalries

- Battipagliese
- Sant'Antonio Abate
- Agropoli
- Scafatese

== See also ==
- Sarno
- Serie D
- Football in Italy

== Bibliography ==
- Ferrentino, Gaetano; Squillante, Alfonso; Pastore, Livio (2005). Storie Granata [Maroon Stories]. Sarno: Quadreni Eventi.
