= Andrea Procaccio =

Italian footballer (born 1996)

Personal information
- Date of birth: 11 January 1996 (age 30)
- Place of birth: Chivasso, Italy
- Height: 1.74 m (5 ft 9 in)
- Position: Winger

Team information
- Current team: Desenzano
- Number: 30

Youth career
- Juventus
- 2011–2014: Bra

Senior career*
Years	Team	Apps	(Gls)
2014	GSD Volpiano		
2014–2015	BSR Grugliasco		
2015–2017	Pro Eureka	60	(8)
2017–2018	Borgosesia	38	(14)
2018–2022	Triestina	108	(6)
2022–2023	Mantova	30	(0)
2023–2024	Renate	25	(1)
2024–	Desenzano	13	(4)
- * Club domestic league appearances and goals as of 15 January 2025

Andrea Procaccio (born 11 January 1996) is an Italian professional footballer who plays as a winger for Serie D club Desenzano.

== Club career ==
Formed on Juventus and Bra youth sector, Procaccio made his senior debut in 2014 for Eccellenza club GSD Volpiano.

Between 2015 and 2018 he played for Serie D clubs Pro Eureka and Borgosesia.

On 12 July 2018, he signed for Serie C club Triestina. He made his professional debut on 18 September against Vis Pesaro.

On 22 July 2022, Procaccio signed a three-year contract with Mantova.
