= Jacopo Silva =

Italian footballer

Personal information
- Date of birth: 20 August 1991 (age 35)
- Place of birth: Piacenza, Italy
- Height: 1.80 m (5 ft 11 in)
- Position: Centre back

Team information
- Current team: Piacenza
- Number: 28

Youth career
- Piacenza

Senior career*
Years	Team	Apps	(Gls)
2011–2012	Piacenza	8	(0)
2012–2015	Pro Piacenza	86	(3)
2015–2019	Piacenza	116	(5)
2019–2020	Casertana	24	(1)
2020–2023	Renate	99	(6)
2023–	Piacenza	0	(0)
- * Club domestic league appearances and goals as of 22 April 2023

Jacopo Silva (born 20 August 1991) is an Italian professional footballer who plays as a centre back for Serie D Group B club Piacenza.

== Club career ==
Born in Piacenza, Silva spend six seasons on Piacenza Calcio and three for Pro Piacenza.

On 29 August 2019, he signed with Casertana.

On 9 October 2020, he joined Renate.

On 19 July 2023, Silva returned to Piacenza.
