= Federico Scoppa =

Argentine footballer

Personal information
- Full name: Federico Matías Scoppa
- Date of birth: 7 July 1987 (age 39)
- Place of birth: San Nicolás, Argentina
- Height: 1.79 m (5 ft 10 in)
- Position: Midfielder

Team information
- Current team: Termoli
- Number: 8

Youth career
- –2006: Boca Juniors

Senior career*
Years	Team	Apps	(Gls)
2006–2010	Boca Juniors II		
2008	→ Leixões (loan)	0	(0)
2008–2009	→ Sporting Covilhã (loan)	7	(0)
2010–2011	Liga de Loja		
2011–2012	Inter Turku	24	(0)
2012–2014	Defensores de Belgrano	40	(0)
2013	→ San Marcos de Arica (loan)	13	(1)
2014–2015	Santamarina	55	(0)
2016	Atlético de Rafaela	7	(0)
2016–2017	Catania	28	(0)
2017–2019	Monopoli	65	(2)
2019–2021	Vicenza	18	(0)
2021	Cavese	13	(1)
2022	Fano	12	(1)
2023–	Termoli	11	(1)
- * Club domestic league appearances and goals as of 8 October 2023

Federico Matías Scoppa (born 7 July 1987) is an Argentine footballer who plays as a midfielder for Italian Serie D club Termoli. He also holds Italian citizenship.

== Club career ==
He made his Segunda Liga debut for Sporting Covilhã on 26 October 2008 in a game against Freamunde.
