= Marco Ferrara =

Italian footballer

Personal information
- Full name: Marco Ferrara
- Date of birth: 5 May 1994 (age 32)
- Place of birth: Milan, Italy
- Height: 1.81 m (5 ft 11 1/2 in)
- Position: Left back

Team information
- Current team: FC Paradiso

Youth career
- 1999–2003: Mombretto
- 2003–2004: Cimiano
- 2004–2005: Milan
- 2005–2007: Pavia
- 2007–2014: Inter

Senior career*
Years	Team	Apps	(Gls)
2013–2014	Inter	0	(0)
2013–2014	→ Pergolettese (loan)	9	(0)
2015	Ascona	11	(2)
2016	Locarno	10	(0)
2016–2017	Příbram	8	(0)
2017–2019	Casertana	17	(0)
2018	→ Villarosa (loan)		
2019	Cavese	14	(0)
2020–	FC Paradiso		
- * Club domestic league appearances and goals as of 21:23, 9 May 2019 (UTC)

Marco Ferrara (born 5 May 1994) is an Italian footballer who plays as a left back for FC Paradiso. Besides Italy, he has played in the Czech Republic.

== Club career ==
On 26 January 2019, he signed with Cavese. He left the club at the end of the season. On 12 February 2020, Ferrara joined Swiss club FC Paradiso.
