= Alessandro Polidori =

Italian footballer (born 1992)

Personal information
- Date of birth: 24 February 1992 (age 34)
- Place of birth: Viterbo, Italy
- Height: 1.82 m (6 ft 0 in)
- Position: Forward

Team information
- Current team: Flaminia

Youth career
- –2012: Ternana

Senior career*
Years	Team	Apps	(Gls)
2012–2013	Sporting Terni	34	(9)
2013–2015	Flaminia Civita Castellana	59	(27)
2015–2016	Rimini	29	(11)
2016–2017	Pescara	0	(0)
2016–2017	→ Arezzo (loan)	36	(10)
2017–2019	Pro Vercelli	12	(1)
2018	→ Trapani (loan)	13	(4)
2018–2019	→ Viterbese (loan)	28	(8)
2019–2020	Siena	15	(1)
2020	→ Piacenza (loan)	7	(1)
2020–2021	Imolese	35	(8)
2021–2022	Monterosi	17	(2)
2022	→ Viterbese (loan)	18	(3)
2022–2023	Viterbese	36	(7)
2023–2024	Virtus Francavilla	29	(7)
2024–2025	Sorrento	17	(1)
2025–	Flaminia	0	(0)
- * Club domestic league appearances and goals as of 27 April 2025

Alessandro Polidori (born 24 February 1992) is an Italian footballer who plays as a forward for Serie D club Flaminia.

== Career ==
He made his Serie C debut for Rimini on 6 September 2015 in a game against Tuttocuoio.

On 22 August 2018, he joined Serie C club Viterbese on a season-long loan. Viterbese held a buyout option at the end of the loan term.

On 12 July 2019, he signed a two-year contract with Siena.

On 3 January 2020, he joined Piacenza on loan until the end of the 2019–20 season. Piacenza holds the purchase option, if that option is exercised at the end of the loan, the contract will automatically be extended to 30 June 2022.

On 1 September 2020 he moved to Imolese on a 2-year contract.

On 23 July 2021, he signed with Monterosi. On 27 January 2022, he returned to Viterbese on loan, with an option to buy.

On 20 July 2023, Polidori moved to Virtus Francavilla.
