= Francesco Belli =

Italian footballer

Personal information
- Date of birth: 16 March 1994 (age 32)
- Place of birth: Florence, Italy
- Height: 1.79 m (5 ft 10 in)
- Positions: Right back; centre back

Team information
- Current team: Casertana

Youth career
- Fiorentina

Senior career*
| Years | Team | Apps | (Gls) |
| 2012–2014 | Pistoiese | 55 | (3) |
| 2014–2019 | Virtus Entella | 154 | (2) |
| 2019–2021 | Pisa | 40 | (2) |
| 2021–2022 | Bari | 19 | (0) |
| 2022–2026 | Padova | 104 | (3) |
| 2026– | Casertana | 0 | (0) |

International career^{‡}
| 2015 | Italy U20 | 1 | (0) |
- * Club domestic league appearances and goals as of 13 May 2026 ‡ National team caps and goals as of 31 March 2015

Francesco Belli (born 16 March 1994) is an Italian professional footballer who plays as a defender for Serie C Group C club Casertana.

== Club career ==
On 8 July 2019, he signed with Pisa.

On 21 July 2021 was signed by Bari.

On 2 August 2022, Belli signed a two-year contract with Padova.

== International career ==
Belli played a match for Italy U20 against Switzerland on Under-20 Four Nations Tournament 2014–15.

== Honours ==
Bari

- Serie C: 2021–22 (Group C)
