= Andrea Bracaletti =

Italian footballer (born 1983)

Personal information
- Date of birth: January 17, 1983 (age 43)
- Place of birth: Orvieto, Italy
- Height: 1.78 m (5 ft 10 in)
- Positions: Winger; midfielder

Team information
- Current team: AC Calvina Sport

Senior career*
Years	Team	Apps	(Gls)
2001–2002	Genoa	0	(0)
2002–2005	San Marino	94	(7)
2005–2008	Cesena	43	(4)
2007–2008	→ Avellino (loan)	20	(1)
2008	→ Sassuolo (loan)	11	(1)
2008–2010	SPAL	46	(6)
2010	→ Cassino (loan)	12	(1)
2010–2017	FeralpiSalò	185	(32)
2017–2019	Triestina	51	(9)
2019	La Fiorita	0	(0)
2019–	AC Calvina Sport	17	(0)
- * Club domestic league appearances and goals as of 20:39, 21 January 2020 (UTC)

Andrea Bracaletti (born January 17, 1983) is an Italian footballer who plays as a midfielder for Serie D club AC Calvina Sport.

== Biography ==
Bracaletti was born in Orvieto.

On 1 September 2008, he was sold to SPAL.

On 31 August 2010, he was sold to FeralpiSalò from SPAL.

On 22 May 2015 Bracaletti signed a new 2-year contract with FeralpiSalò.

On 31 January 2019 he was released from his contract with Triestina by mutual consent. On 17 June 2019, Bracaletti joined La Fiorita in San Marino. Bracaletti played both UEFA Europa League qualification games for the club in June and July against Andorran club UE Engordany. However, La Fiorita lost both games and Bracaletti left the club. He then joined Serie D club A.C. Calvina Sport on 19 August 2019.
