= Mattia Rossetti =

Italian footballer

Personal information
- Date of birth: 16 June 1996 (age 30)
- Place of birth: Mirabella Eclano, Italy
- Height: 1.83 m (6 ft 0 in)
- Position: Forward

Team information
- Current team: Pergolettese
- Number: 9

Youth career
- Eclanese
- Leonardo Surro
- Salernitana
- –2015: Catania

Senior career*
Years	Team	Apps	(Gls)
2014–2019	Catania	17	(1)
2016	→ Lupa Castelli Romani (loan)	11	(1)
2016–2017	→ Vibonese (loan)	7	(0)
2018–2019	→ Sicula Leonzio (loan)	19	(3)
2019–2020	ACR Messina	11	(3)
2020–2021	Acireale	7	(1)
2021–2022	Campobasso	50	(13)
2022–2023	Piacenza	18	(3)
2023	Rimini	14	(1)
2023–2025	Potenza	37	(4)
2025	→ Sorrento (loan)	9	(2)
2025–2026	Sarnese	11	(0)
2026–	Pergolettese	8	(0)
- * Club domestic league appearances and goals as of 30 April 2026

Mattia Rossetti (born 16 June 1996) is an Italian footballer who plays as a forward for Serie C Group A club Pergolettese.

== Career ==
He made his Serie B debut for Catania on 24 December 2014 in a game against Cittadella.

On 13 December 2019 he joined Serie D club ACR Messina.

On 13 February 2021, Rosetti joined to Campobasso.

On 6 July 2022, Rossetti signed a two-year contract with Piacenza.

On 4 January 2023, Rossetti moved to Rimini on a 1.5-year contract.

On 25 August 2023, Rossetti joined Potenza with a two-year contract.
