= Manuel Di Paola =

Italian professional footballer

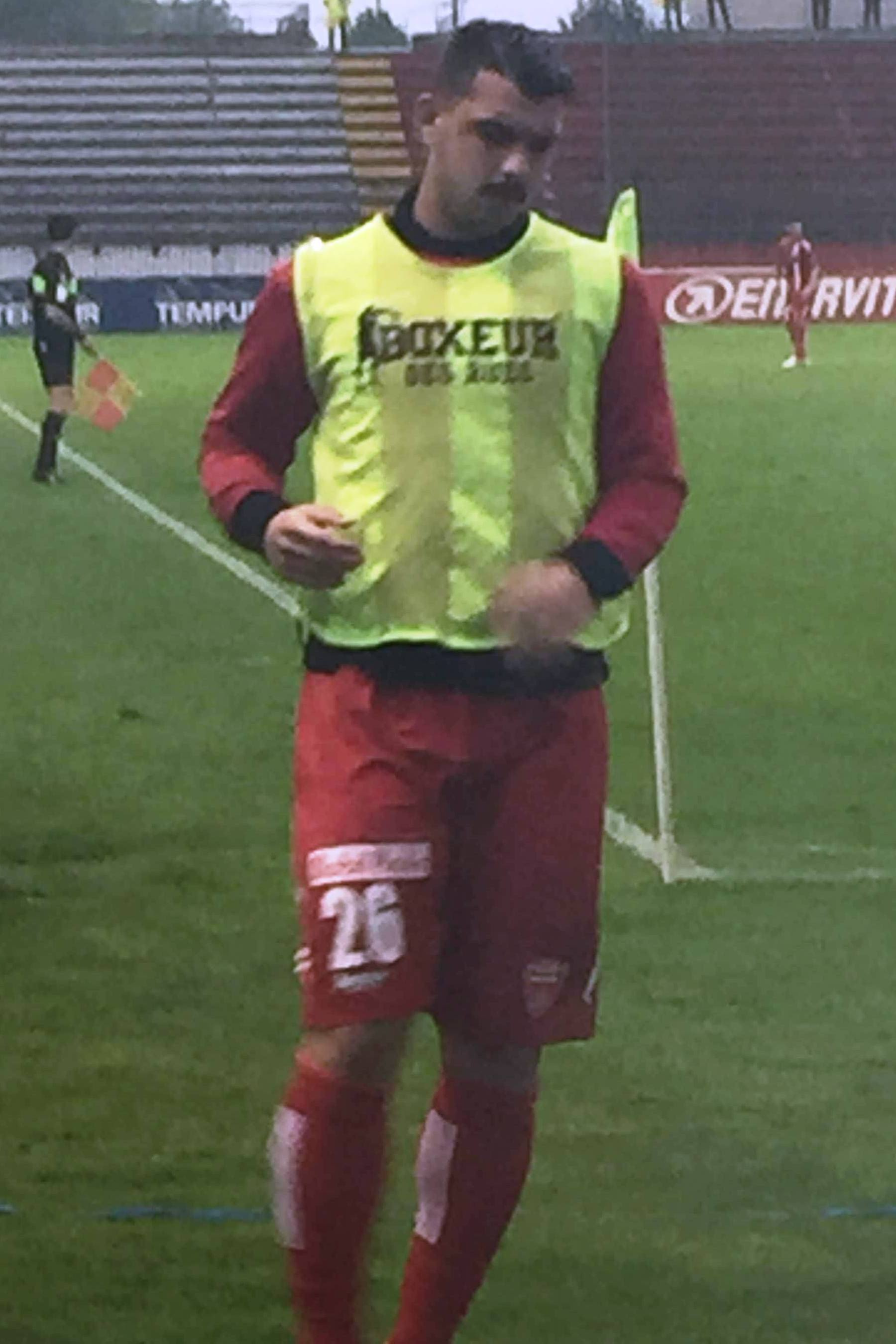
- Di Paola for Monza in 2019

Personal information
- Date of birth: 6 October 1997 (age 29)
- Place of birth: Parma, Italy
- Height: 1.80 m (5 ft 11 in)
- Position: Midfielder

Team information
- Current team: Vis Pesaro
- Number: 10

Senior career*
Years	Team	Apps	(Gls)
2016–2019	Virtus Entella	30	(0)
2019	→ Monza (loan)	7	(0)
2019–2020	Virtus Verona	7	(0)
2020–2021	Vis Pesaro	25	(7)
2021–2022	Modena	25	(0)
2022–	Vis Pesaro	125	(15)
- * Club domestic league appearances and goals as of 30 April 2026

Manuel Di Paola (born 6 October 1997) is an Italian professional footballer who plays as a midfielder for Serie C Group B club Vis Pesaro.

== Club career ==
On 28 January 2019, he joined Monza on a loan contract with a purchase option.

On 30 August 2019, he signed with Virtus Verona. Virtus Verona contract was terminated by mutual consent on 5 October 2020.

On 9 July 2021 he joined Modena.

On 5 July 2022, Di Paola returned to Vis Pesaro on a two-year deal.
