= Alberto Tronco =

Italian footballer (born 1997)

Personal information
- Date of birth: 22 May 1997 (age 29)
- Place of birth: Cittadella, Italy
- Height: 1.78 m (5 ft 10 in)
- Position: Forward

Team information
- Current team: Folgore Caratese

Senior career*
Years	Team	Apps	(Gls)
2014–2015	Fiorentina	0	(0)
2015–2016	Hellas Verona	26	(2)
2016–2018	Virtus Bassano	18	(1)
2018–2020	Vicenza	32	(1)
2020–	Folgore Caratese	13	(0)
- * Club domestic league appearances and goals

Alberto Tronco (born 22 May 1997) is an Italian professional footballer who plays as a forward for Folgore Caratese.
