= Alessandro Fabbri (footballer) =

Italian footballer (born 1990)

Personal information
- Date of birth: 11 March 1990 (age 36)
- Place of birth: Cesena, Italy
- Height: 1.70 m (5 ft 7 in)
- Position: Left back

Team information
- Current team: K-Sport Montecchio Gallo

Youth career
- Rimini

Senior career*
Years	Team	Apps	(Gls)
2009	Tre Fiori		
2009–2013	Santarcangelo	89	(1)
2009–2010	→ Del Conca (loan)		
2013–2014	Sampierana		(6)
2014–2015	Mezzolara	25	(0)
2015–2016	Ribelle	37	(7)
2016–2018	Mestre	66	(3)
2018–2022	Südtirol	125	(2)
2022–2023	Trento	35	(1)
2023–2025	Casertana	24	(0)
2025–2026	San Marino	4	(0)
2026–	K-Sport Montecchio Gallo		
- * Club domestic league appearances and goals as of 25 January 2026

Alessandro Fabbri (born 11 March 1990) is an Italian professional footballer who plays as a left back for Eccellenza club K-Sport Montecchio Gallo.

== Club career ==
Formed in Rimini youth sector, Fabbri made his senior debut for Santarcangelo in 2009–10 season.

On 3 July 2018, he joined Serie C club Südtirol. Fabbri played his 100 official match for the club on 21 February 2021 against Padova.

On 15 June 2022, Fabbri signed a two-year contract with Trento.
