= 2016–17 AC ChievoVerona season =

Chievo
2016–17 season
- President: Luca Campedelli
- Manager: Rolando Maran
- Stadium: Stadio Marc'Antonio Bentegodi
- Serie A: 14th
- Coppa Italia: Round of 16
- Top goalscorer: League: Roberto Inglese (10); All: Roberto Inglese (12)
- Highest home attendance: 27,000 vs Juventus (6 November 2016, Serie A)
- Lowest home attendance: 250 vs Novara (29 November 2016, Coppa Italia)
- Average home league attendance: 11,632
Home colours	Away colours	Third colours

The 2016–17 season was Associazione Calcio ChievoVerona's tenth consecutive season in Serie A. The club finished 14th in Serie A and advanced to the round of 16 in the Coppa Italia, where they were eliminated by Fiorentina.

== Players ==
=== Squad information ===
In italics players who left the club during the season. Note: Flags indicate national team as defined under FIFA eligibility rules; some limited exceptions apply. Players may hold more than one non-FIFA nationality.

No.	Pos.	Nation	Player
1	MF	CAN	Jonathan de Guzmán (on loan from Napoli)
2	DF	ARG	Nicolás Spolli
3	DF	ITA	Dario Dainelli
4	MF	ITA	Nicola Rigoni
5	DF	ITA	Alessandro Gamberini
8	MF	SRB	Ivan Radovanović
12	DF	SVN	Boštjan Cesar
13	MF	ARG	Mariano Izco
18	DF	ITA	Massimo Gobbi
19	MF	ARG	Lucas Castro
20	DF	ITA	Gennaro Sardo
21	DF	FRA	Nicolas Frey (vice-captain)
22	MF	GAM	Yusupha Bobb
23	MF	SVN	Valter Birsa
27	MF	ITA	Vittorio Parigini

No.	Pos.	Nation	Player
28	MF	BEL	Samuel Bastien
29	DF	ITA	Fabrizio Cacciatore
31	FW	ITA	Sergio Pellissier (captain)
32	GK	ITA	Walter Bressan
45	FW	ITA	Roberto Inglese
56	MF	FIN	Përparim Hetemaj
69	FW	ITA	Riccardo Meggiorini
70	GK	ITA	Stefano Sorrentino
83	FW	ITA	Antonio Floro Flores
90	GK	ITA	Andrea Seculin
95	FW	GAM	Lamin Jallow
96	MF	ITA	Filippo Damian
97	MF	ITA	Fabio Depaoli
98	GK	ITA	Alessandro Confente

=== Out on loan ===
Note: Flags indicate national team as defined under FIFA eligibility rules; some limited exceptions apply. Players may hold more than one non-FIFA nationality.

No.	Pos.	Nation	Player
36	DF	ITA	Filippo Costa (at SPAL from January to June 2017)

== Transfers ==
=== In ===
Date	Pos.	Player	Age	Moving from	Fee	Notes	Source
2 July 2016	GK	(Italy) Stefano Sorrentino	37	(Italy) Palermo	Free		
19 July 2016	MF	(Italy) Antonio Cinelli	26	(Italy) Cagliari	€600,000		

==== Loans in ====
Date	Pos.	Player	Age	Moving from	Fee	Notes	Source
26 August 2016	MF	(Canada) Jonathan de Guzmán	28	(Italy) Napoli		Option to buy	

=== Out ===
Date	Pos.	Player	Age	Moving to	Fee	Notes	Source
1 July 2016	GK	(Argentina) Albano Bizzarri	38	(Italy) Pescara	€200,000		
5 July 2016	DF	(Brazil) Edimar	30	(Brazil) Cruzeiro	€850,000		
19 July 2016	MF	(Italy) Lorenzo Marchionni	21	(Italy) Pro Piacenza	€150,000		
19 July 2016	MF	(Ghana) Isaac Ntow	22	(Italy) Sambenedettese	€75,000		

==== Loans out ====
Date	Pos.	Player	Age	Moving to	Fee	Notes	Source
30 June 2016	MF	(Italy) Mario Gargiulo	20	(Italy) Lucchese	Loan		
30 June 2016	DF	(Italy) Davide Savi	20	(Italy) Renate	Loan		
30 June 2016	DF	(Italy) Matteo Solini	23	(Italy) Arezzo	Loan		
30 June 2016	FW	(France) Arthur Yamga	20	(Italy) Arezzo	Loan		
4 July 2016	DF	(Italy) Marco Calderoni	27	(Italy) Novara	Loan		
5 July 2016	MF	(Poland) Tomasz Kupisz	26	(Italy) Novara	Loan		
8 July 2016	FW	(Bulgaria) Radoslav Kirilov	24	(Bulgaria) Beroe	Loan		
8 July 2016	GK	(Italy) Ivan Provedel	22	(Italy) Pro Vercelli	Loan		
12 July 2016	FW	(Italy) Massimiliano Gatto	20	(Italy) Pisa	Loan		
12 July 2016	MF	(Senegal) Malick Mbaye	20	(Italy) Carpi	Loan		
22 July 2016	GK	(Italy) Matteo Brunelli	21	(Italy) Messina	Loan		
22 July 2016	FW	(France) Mehdi Léris	18	(Italy) Juventus	Loan		
22 July 2016	DF	(Italy) Raffaele Pucino	25	(Italy) Vicenza	Loan		

== Pre-season and friendlies ==
10 July 2016 Friendly	Chievo (Italy)	6–0	(Italy) Rappresentativa Juniores Trentino	Brentonico
17:30 CEST (UTC+02:00)	Pellissier 13' (pen.); Inglese 38'; Jallow 47'; Cacciatore 85'; Miranda 87'; Meggiorini 90'	Report		Stadium: Centro Sportivo Santa Caterina; Referee: Roberto Lovison

13 July 2016 Friendly	Chievo (Italy)	12–1	(Italy) Top 22 Calcio Dilettante Veronese	Brentonico
17:30 CEST (UTC+02:00)	Meggiorini 25', 40'; Birsa 28'; M'Poku 54', 85' (pen.); Castro 55', 79'; Jallow 58', 61'; Inglese 62'; Rigoni 66'; Cesar 90'	Report	De Rossi 72'	Stadium: Centro Sportivo Santa Caterina; Referee: Fabrizio Ciamarone

16 July 2016 Friendly	Standard Liège (Belgium)	3–0	(Italy) Chievo	Liège
18:00 CEST (UTC+02:00)	Santini 39'; Arslanagić 44'; Edmilson 47'	Report		Stadium: Stade Maurice Dufrasne; Attendance: 6,138; Referee: Wilm Smets

23 July 2016 Friendly	Chievo (Italy)	6–0	(Italy) Virtus Verona	San Zeno di Montagna
17:30 CEST (UTC+02:00)	Pellissier 22', 27'; Gobbi 39'; Inglese 71'; Da Silva 74'; Cinelli 87'	Report		Stadium: Centro Sportivo Naviglio; Referee: Filippo Bonassoli

24 July 2016 Friendly	Chievo (Italy)	3–3	(Italy) Altovicentino	San Zeno di Montagna
17:30 CEST (UTC+02:00)	Jallow 30', 43'; Cacciatore 55'	Report	Aperi 7'; Pozza 20'; Simoncelli 37'	Stadium: Centro Sportivo Naviglio; Referee: Stefano Nicolini

27 July 2016 Friendly	Chievo (Italy)	2–2	(Italy) Cittadella	Rovereto
17:30 CEST (UTC+02:00)	Pellissier 37'; Meggiorini 70' (pen.)	Report	Litteri 17'; Paolucci 66'	Stadium: Stadio Quercia; Attendance: 400; Referee: Andrea Sprezzola

30 July 2016 Friendly	Chievo (Italy)	0–2	(Italy) Sampdoria	Rovereto
17:30 CEST (UTC+02:00)		Report	Muriel 17'; Quagliarella 43'	Stadium: Stadio Quercia; Referee: Daniele Chiffi

4 August 2016 Friendly	Chievo (Italy)	2–0	(Italy) Parma	Castiglione delle Stiviere
17:30 CEST (UTC+02:00)	Meggiorini 7'; Inglese 64'	Report		Stadium: Stadio Lusetti; Referee: Alessandro Prontera

6 August 2016 Friendly	1899 Hoffenheim (Germany)	2–0	(Italy) Chievo	Sinsheim
15:00 CEST (UTC+02:00)	Uth 7'; Wagner 71'	Report		Stadium: Rhein-Neckar-Arena

10 August 2016 Sportitalia Cup	Brescia (Italy)	0–3	(Italy) Chievo	Carate Brianza
20:30 CEST (UTC+02:00)			Meggiorini 5', 40'; Spolli 30'	Stadium: Stadio XXV Aprile; Referee: Emilio Zanotti

10 August 2016 Sportitalia Cup	Chievo (Italy)	1–0	(Italy) Folgore Caratese	Carate Brianza
21:30 CEST (UTC+02:00)	Damian 19'			Stadium: Stadio XXV Aprile; Referee: Simone Biffi

1 September 2016 Friendly	Chievo (Italy)	1–0	(Italy) A.C. Vigasio	Bardolino
17:00 CEST (UTC+02:00)	Bastien 80'	Report		Stadium: Centro Sportivo Veronello; Referee: Emanuele Ceriello

11 November 2016 Friendly	Chievo (Italy)	1–1	(Slovenia) Olimpija Ljubljana	Bardolino
14:30 CET (UTC+01:00)	De Guzmán 22'	Report	Eleke 69'	Stadium: Centro Sportivo Veronello; Referee: Luca Candeo

== Competitions ==
=== Serie A ===
==== League table ====
Pos	Team	Pld	W	D	L	GF	GA	GD	Pts
12	Sassuolo	38	13	7	18	58	63	−5	46
13	Udinese	38	12	9	17	47	56	−9	45
14	Chievo	38	12	7	19	43	61	−18	43
15	Bologna	38	11	8	19	40	58	−18	41
16	Genoa	38	9	9	20	38	64	−26	36

Source: Serie A, Soccerway
Rules for classification: 1) Points; 2) Head-to-head points; 3) Head-to-head goal difference; 4) Goal difference; 5) Goals scored; 6) Draw.

==== Results summary ====
Overall								Home						Away					
Pld	W	D	L	GF	GA	GD	Pts	W	D	L	GF	GA	GD	W	D	L	GF	GA	GD
38	12	7	19	43	61	−18	43	6	5	8	25	30	−5	6	2	11	18	31	−13

Last updated: 27 May 2017.
Source: Competitive matches

==== Results by round ====
Round	1	2	3	4	5	6	7	8	9	10	11	12	13	14	15	16	17	18	19	20	21	22	23	24	25	26	27	28	29	30	31	32	33	34	35	36	37	38
Ground	H	A	H	A	H	A	A	H	A	H	A	H	H	A	H	A	H	A	H	A	H	A	H	A	H	H	A	H	A	H	A	A	H	A	H	A	H	A
Result	W	L	D	W	W	L	W	L	D	D	L	L	W	L	D	W	W	L	L	L	L	W	D	W	L	W	L	W	L	L	L	L	L	W	D	D	L	L
Position	3	8	9	5	4	7	5	7	7	9	11	12	10	13	13	11	10	11	11	12	13	11	11	11	11	11	11	11	11	11	12	13	13	13	12	13	14	14

Updated to match(es) played on 28 May 2017. Source: Competitive matches
A = Away; H = Home; W = Win; D = Draw; L = Loss

==== Matches ====
21 August 2016 1	Chievo	2–0	Internazionale	Verona
20:45 CEST (UTC+02:00)	Birsa 48', 81'; Meggiorini (yellow card) 72'; Radovanović (yellow card) 78'	Report	D'Ambrosio (yellow card) 29'; Medel (yellow card) 77'; Brozović (yellow card) 80'; Kondogbia (yellow card) 87'	Stadium: Stadio Marc'Antonio Bentegodi; Attendance: 22,000; Referee: Massimiliano Irrati

28 August 2016 2	Fiorentina	1–0	Chievo	Florence
20:45 CEST (UTC+02:00)	Sánchez 28'	Report	Cesar (yellow card) 12'; Hetemaj (yellow card) 64'	Stadium: Stadio Artemio Franchi; Attendance: 32,304; Referee: Michael Fabbri

11 September 2016 3	Chievo	1–1	Lazio	Verona
15:00 CEST (UTC+02:00)	Gamberini 51'; Hetemaj (yellow card) 54'; Cesar (yellow card) 90+2'	Report	De Vrij 55'; Parolo (yellow card) 60'; Milinković-Savić (yellow card) 68'; Basta (yellow card) 87'; Felipe Anderson (yellow card) 90+1'; Radu (yellow card) 90+2'	Stadium: Stadio Marc'Antonio Bentegodi; Attendance: 10,000; Referee: Daniele Orsato

18 September 2016 4	Udinese	1–2	Chievo	Udine
12:30 CEST (UTC+02:00)	Zapata 25'; Hallfreðsson (yellow card) 39'; Kone (yellow card) 78'; Perica (yellow card) 88'	Report	Radovanović (yellow card) 33'; Cesar (yellow card) 36'; Cacciatore (yellow card) 77', (goal) 90+5'; Castro 82'; Dainelli (yellow card) 89'	Stadium: Stadio Friuli; Attendance: 15,878; Referee: Luca Pairetto

21 September 2016 5	Chievo	2–1	Sassuolo	Verona
20:45 CEST (UTC+02:00)	Rigoni 21'; Castro 40'; Meggiorini (yellow card) 60'; Sorrentino (yellow card) 90+4'	Report	Defrel 28'; Biondini (yellow card) 54'	Stadium: Stadio Marc'Antonio Bentegodi; Attendance: 12,000; Referee: Piero Giacomelli

25 September 2016 6	Napoli	2–0	Chievo	Naples
20:45 CEST (UTC+02:00)	Koulibaly (yellow card) 14'; Gabbiadini 24'; Hamšík 39'; Albiol (yellow card) 43'	Report	Gobbi (yellow card) 11'; Cesar (yellow card) 44'; Dainelli (yellow card) 54'; Castro (yellow card) 76'	Stadium: Stadio San Paolo; Attendance: 19,942; Referee: Marco Di Bello

2 October 2016 7	Pescara	0–2	Chievo	Pescara
18:00 CEST (UTC+02:00)	Brugman (yellow card) 56'	Report	Frey (yellow card) 25'; Spolli (yellow card) 46'; Meggiorini 76'; Dainelli (yellow card) 79'; Inglese 85'	Stadium: Stadio Adriatico; Attendance: 13,782; Referee: Gianluca Manganiello

16 October 2016 8	Chievo	1–3	Milan	Verona
20:45 CEST (UTC+02:00)	Dainelli (yellow card) 14'; Birsa 76'; Meggiorini (yellow card) 78'; Cacciatore (yellow card) 90+1'	Report	Locatelli (yellow card) 35'; Kucka 45'; Niang 46'; Paletta (yellow card) 75'; Dainell 90+4' (o.g.)	Stadium: Stadio Marc'Antonio Bentegodi; Attendance: 24,000; Referee: Gianluca Rocchi

23 October 2016 9	Empoli	0–0	Chievo	Empoli
15:00 CEST (UTC+02:00)	Bellusci (yellow card) 19'; Mauri (yellow card) 21'; Pucciarelli (yellow card) 70'	Report	Castro (yellow card) 44' (yellow-red card) 80'; Birsa (yellow card) 50'; Rigoni (yellow card) 77'; Gobbi (yellow card) 85'	Stadium: Stadio Carlo Castellani; Attendance: 7,105; Referee: Fabio Maresca

26 October 2016 10	Chievo	1–1	Bologna	Verona
20:45 CEST (UTC+02:00)	Mbaye 70' (o.g.)	Report	Pulgar 52'; Nagy (yellow card) 67'; Helander (yellow card) 83'; Verdi (yellow card) 85'; Sadiq (yellow card) 90+1'	Stadium: Stadio Marc'Antonio Bentegodi; Attendance: 10,000; Referee: Fabrizio Pasqua

30 October 2016 11	Crotone	2–0	Chievo	Crotone
15:00 CET (UTC+01:00)	Trotta 45+3' (pen.); Rosi (yellow card) 60'; Falcinelli 90+2'	Report	Hetemaj (yellow card) 45'; Spolli (yellow card) 76'	Stadium: Stadio Ezio Scida; Attendance: 7,298; Referee: Luca Pairetto

6 November 2016 12	Chievo	1–2	Juventus	Verona
15:00 CET (UTC+01:00)	Dainelli (yellow card) 31'; Gobbi (yellow card) 34'; Radovanović (yellow card) 45+3'; Pellissier 66' (pen.); De Guzmán (yellow card) 82'; Cacciatore (yellow card) 90+1'	Report	Alex Sandro (yellow card) 40'; Cuadrado (yellow card) 48'; Mandžukić 53'; Lichtsteiner (yellow card) 65'; Pjanić 75'; Sturaro (yellow card) 80'	Stadium: Stadio Marc'Antonio Bentegodi; Attendance: 27,000; Referee: Paolo Valeri

19 November 2016 13	Chievo	1–0	Cagliari	Verona
15:00 CET (UTC+01:00)	Radovanović (yellow card) 40'; Gobbi 53'; Spolli (yellow card) 62'; Cacciatore (yellow card) 90+2'	Report	Bittante (yellow card) 29'; Ceppitelli (yellow card) 57'; Munari (yellow card) 88'	Stadium: Stadio Marc'Antonio Bentegodi; Attendance: 10,000; Referee: Claudio Gavillucci

26 November 2016 14	Torino	2–1	Chievo	Turin
18:00 CET (UTC+01:00)	Ljajić (yellow card) 13'; Falque 35', 38'; Castán (yellow card) 65'	Report	Dainelli (yellow card) 24'; Inglese 85'; Cacciatore (red card) 89'	Stadium: Stadio Olimpico Grande Torino; Attendance: 18,530; Referee: Daniele Chiffi

5 December 2016 15	Chievo	0–0	Genoa	Verona
19:00 CET (UTC+01:00)	Meggiorini (yellow card) 45'; Hetemaj (yellow card) 73'	Report	Muñoz (yellow card) 46'; Rigoni (yellow card) 61'; Lazović (yellow card) 90+3'	Stadium: Stadio Marc'Antonio Bentegodi; Attendance: 8,000; Referee: Carmine Russo

11 December 2016 16	Palermo	0–2	Chievo	Palermo
15:00 CET (UTC+01:00)	Chochev (yellow card) 63'	Report	Birsa 14'; Pellissier 49'; De Guzmán (yellow card) 73'	Stadium: Stadio Renzo Barbera; Attendance: 21,232; Referee: Paolo Tagliavento

18 December 2016 17	Chievo	2–1	Sampdoria	Verona
15:00 CET (UTC+01:00)	Meggiorini 9'; Pellissier 42' (pen.); Spolli (yellow card) 61'	Report	Regini (yellow card) 18'; Puggioni (yellow card) 41'; Schick 90+3'	Stadium: Stadio Marc'Antonio Bentegodi; Attendance: 10,000; Referee: Maurizio Mariani

22 December 2016 18	Roma	3–1	Chievo	Rome
20:45 CET (UTC+01:00)	El Shaarawy 45+1'; Džeko 52'; Perotti 90+3' (pen.)	Report	De Guzmán 37'; Dainelli (yellow card) 45'; Rigoni (yellow card) 88'	Stadium: Stadio Olimpico; Attendance: 25,058; Referee: Gianpaolo Calvarese

8 January 2017 19	Chievo	1–4	Atalanta	Verona
15:00 CET (UTC+01:00)	Frey (yellow card) 29'; Pellissier 62'	Report	Gómez 4', 23'; Grassi (yellow card) 27'; Conti 42'; Freuler 69'	Stadium: Stadio Marc'Antonio Bentegodi; Attendance: 9,000; Referee: Federico La Penna

14 January 2017 20	Internazionale	3–1	Chievo	Milan
20:45 CET (UTC+01:00)	Icardi 69'; Perišić 86'; Éder 90+3'	Report	Birsa (yellow card) 32'; Pellissier 34'; Radovanović (yellow card) 63'; Spolli (yellow card) 81'	Stadium: San Siro; Attendance: 34,255; Referee: Piero Giacomelli

21 January 2017 21	Chievo	0–3	Fiorentina	Verona
18:00 CET (UTC+01:00)	Birsa (yellow card) 17'; Cesar (yellow card) 40'; Meggiorini (yellow card) 58'	Report	Tello 18'; Sánchez (yellow card) 36'; Babacar 52' (pen.); Bernardeschi (yellow card) 65'; Chiesa 90+4'	Stadium: Stadio Marc'Antonio Bentegodi; Attendance: 8,500; Referee: Fabio Maresca

28 January 2017 22	Lazio	0–1	Chievo	Rome
18:00 CET (UTC+01:00)	Milinković-Savić (yellow card) 31'; Lulić (yellow card) 85'	Report	Cacciatore (yellow card) 45'; Izco (yellow card) 70'; Inglese 90'	Stadium: Stadio Olimpico; Attendance: 12,000; Referee: Michael Fabbri

5 February 2017 23	Chievo	0–0	Udinese	Verona
15:00 CET (UTC+01:00)	Meggiorini (yellow card) 29'; Cesar (yellow card) 65' (yellow-red card) 82'; Radovanović (yellow card) 70'	Report	De Paul (yellow card) 42'	Stadium: Stadio Marc'Antonio Bentegodi; Attendance: 8,500; Referee: Gianluca Aureliano

12 February 2017 24	Sassuolo	1–3	Chievo	Reggio Emilia
15:00 CET (UTC+01:00)	Letschert (red card) 4'; Matri 24'	Report	Dainelli (yellow card) 36'; Inglese 39', 56', 67'; Gobbi (yellow card) 45+2'; Gakpé (yellow card) 90'	Stadium: Mapei Stadium – Città del Tricolore; Attendance: 9,581; Referee: Luca Pairetto

19 February 2017 25	Chievo	1–3	Napoli	Verona
15:00 CET (UTC+01:00)	Cacciatore (yellow card) 54'; Meggiorini 72'	Report	Insigne 31'; Hamšík 38'; Zieliński 58'	Stadium: Stadio Marc'Antonio Bentegodi; Attendance: 10,000; Referee: Massimiliano Irrati

26 February 2017 26	Chievo	2–0	Pescara	Verona
15:00 CET (UTC+01:00)	Birsa 12'; Hetemaj (yellow card) 23'; Spolli (yellow card) 34'; De Guzmán (yellow card) 37'; Castro 61'	Report	Memushaj (yellow card) 25'; Cerri (yellow card) 41'; Coda (yellow card) 57'	Stadium: Stadio Marc'Antonio Bentegodi; Attendance: 9,500; Referee: Claudio Gavillucci

4 March 2017 27	Milan	3–1	Chievo	Milan
CET (UTC+01:00)	Bacca 24', 70'; Deulofeu (yellow card) 33'; Lapadula 82' (pen.); Ocampos (yellow card) 90+2'	Report	De Guzmán 42' (pen.); Cesar (yellow card) 45+2'	Stadium: San Siro; Attendance: 27,357; Referee: Fabio Maresca

12 March 2017 28	Chievo	4–0	Empoli	Verona
15:00 CET (UTC+01:00)	Inglese 22'; Pellissier 40'; Birsa 75'; Cesar 89'	Report	Dioussé (yellow card) 55'	Stadium: Stadio Marc'Antonio Bentegodi; Attendance: 9,000; Referee: Piero Giacomelli

19 March 2017 29	Bologna	4–1	Chievo	Bologna
15:00 CET (UTC+01:00)	Pulgar (yellow card) 25'; Maietta (yellow card) 54'; Verdi 61'; Džemaili 72', 90'; Di Francesco 90+3'	Report	Hetemaj (yellow card) 28'; Castro 40'; Spolli (yellow card) 42'; Birsa (yellow card) 64'	Stadium: Stadio Renato Dall'Ara; Attendance: 20,982; Referee: Rosario Abisso

2 April 2017 30	Chievo	1–2	Crotone	Verona
15:00 CEST (UTC+02:00)	Pellissier 57'; Castro (yellow card) 68'; Radovanović (yellow card) 90+3'	Report	Ferrari 51'; Ceccherini (yellow card) 66'; Rosi (yellow card) 74'; Falcinelli 82'	Stadium: Stadio Marc'Antonio Bentegodi; Attendance: 8,500; Referee: Gianpaolo Calvarese

8 April 2017 31	Juventus	2–0	Chievo	Turin
20:45 CEST (UTC+02:00)	Higuaín 23', 84'; Bonucci (yellow card) 79'	Report	Cacciatore (yellow card) 18'; Spolli (yellow card) 55'	Stadium: Juventus Stadium; Attendance: 39,477; Referee: Michael Fabbri

15 April 2017 32	Cagliari	4–0	Chievo	Cagliari
15:00 CEST (UTC+02:00)	Borriello 11'; Sau 15'; Deiola (yellow card) 35'; João Pedro 40', 90'; Ioniță (yellow card) 88'	Report	Castro (yellow card) 16'; Cesar (yellow card) 76'	Stadium: Stadio Sant'Elia; Attendance: 10,746; Referee: Gianluca Manganiello

23 April 2017 33	Chievo	1–3	Torino	Verona
15:00 CEST (UTC+02:00)	Pellissier 65'; Kiyine (yellow card) 80'	Report	Ljajić 52'; Zappacosta 56', (yellow card) 77'; Falque 75'	Stadium: Stadio Marc'Antonio Bentegodi; Attendance: 10,000; Referee: Maurizio Mariani

30 April 2017 34	Genoa	1–2	Chievo	Genoa
15:00 CEST (UTC+02:00)	Pandev 43'; Laxalt (yellow card) 83'	Report	Bastien 60'; Gobbi (yellow card) 68'; Radovanović (yellow card) 68'; Birsa 70'; Depaoli (yellow card) 80' (yellow-red card) 90+1'	Stadium: Stadio Luigi Ferraris; Attendance: 19,467; Referee: Luca Pairetto

7 May 2017 35	Chievo	1–1	Palermo	Verona
15:00 CEST (UTC+02:00)	Cesar (yellow card) 46'; Pellissier 67' (pen.); Gamberini (yellow card) 82'; Birsa (yellow card) 87'	Report	Jajalo (yellow card) 21'; González (yellow card) 41'; Sallai (yellow card) 77'; Goldaniga 88'	Stadium: Stadio Marc'Antonio Bentegodi; Attendance: 10,000; Referee: Marco Serra

14 May 2017 36	Sampdoria	1–1	Chievo	Genoa
15:00 CEST (UTC+02:00)	Quagliarella 11'; Regini (yellow card) 23'; Đuričić (yellow card) 85'	Report	Pellissier (yellow card) 25'; Inglese 46'; Radovanović (yellow card) 79'; Depaoli (yellow card) 90'; Castro (yellow card) 90+3'	Stadium: Stadio Luigi Ferraris; Attendance: 18,163; Referee: Fabio Maresca

20 May 2017 37	Chievo	3–5	Roma	Verona
18:00 CEST (UTC+02:00)	Castro 15', (yellow card) 15'; Inglese 37', 86'; Radovanović (yellow card) 47'	Report	El Shaarawy 28', 58'; Salah 42', 76'; Džeko 83'	Stadium: Stadio Marc'Antonio Bentegodi; Attendance: 13,000; Referee: Antonio Damato

27 May 2017 38	Atalanta	1–0	Chievo	Bergamo
18:00 CEST (UTC+02:00)	Gómez 52'; Caldara (yellow card) 77'	Report		Stadium: Stadio Atleti Azzurri d'Italia; Attendance: 19,217; Referee: Domenico Celi

=== Coppa Italia ===
13 August 2016 Third round	Chievo	3–0	Virtus Entella	Verona
20:45 CEST (UTC+02:00)	Meggiorini 36'; Castro 64'; Pellissier 82'		Masucci (yellow card) 51'	Stadium: Stadio Marc'Antonio Bentegodi; Attendance: 2,500; Referee: Fabio Maresca

29 November 2016 Fourth round	Chievo	3–0	Novara	Verona
18:00 CET (UTC+01:00)	Inglese 27', 30' (pen.); Cesar 49'	Report		Stadium: Stadio Marc'Antonio Bentegodi; Attendance: 250; Referee: Riccardo Pinzani

11 January 2017 Round of 16	Fiorentina	1–0	Chievo	Florence
17:30 CET (UTC+01:00)	Tomović (yellow card) 52'; Vecino (yellow card) 61'; Badelj (yellow card) 64'; Kalinić (yellow card) 65'; Zárate (red card) 71'; Bernardeschi 90+3' (pen.)	Report	Radovanović (yellow card) 17' (yellow-red card) 45+3'; Castro (yellow card) 36'; Gobbi (yellow card) 88'; Sorrentino (yellow card) 90+2'	Stadium: Stadio Artemio Franchi; Attendance: 6,477; Referee: Domenico Celi

== Statistics ==
=== Appearances and goals ===
No.	Pos	Nat	Player	Total		Serie A		Coppa Italia	
No.	Pos	Nat	Player	Apps	Goals	Apps	Goals	Apps	Goals
Goalkeepers
32	GK	(Italy) ITA	Walter Bressan	0	0	0	0	0	0
70	GK	(Italy) ITA	Stefano Sorrentino	36	0	34	0	2	0
90	GK	(Italy) ITA	Andrea Seculin	5	0	4	0	1	0
Defenders
2	DF	(Argentina) ARG	Nicolás Spolli	23	0	15+6	0	2	0
3	DF	(Italy) ITA	Dario Dainelli	27	0	25+1	0	1	0
5	DF	(Italy) ITA	Alessandro Gamberini	21	1	20	1	0+1	0
12	DF	(Slovenia) SVN	Boštjan Cesar	20	2	16+1	1	3	1
18	DF	(Italy) ITA	Massimo Gobbi	32	1	30	1	2	0
20	DF	(Italy) ITA	Gennaro Sardo	1	0	0+1	0	0	0
21	DF	(France) FRA	Nicolas Frey	17	0	13+2	0	1+1	0
29	DF	(Italy) ITA	Fabrizio Cacciatore	31	1	29	1	2	0
Midfielders
1	MF	(Canada) CAN	Jonathan de Guzmán	29	2	15+12	2	2	0
4	MF	(Italy) ITA	Nicola Rigoni	13	1	5+7	1	1	0
8	MF	(Serbia) SRB	Ivan Radovanović	37	0	32+3	0	2	0
13	MF	(Argentina) ARG	Mariano Julio Izco	27	0	12+13	0	2	0
19	MF	(Argentina) ARG	Lucas Castro	35	6	33	5	2	1
23	MF	(Slovenia) SVN	Valter Birsa	37	7	34+1	7	1+1	0
28	MF	(Belgium) BEL	Samuel Bastien	13	1	8+4	1	1	0
55	MF	(Italy) ITA	Emanuel Vignato	2	0	0+2	0	0	0
56	MF	(Finland) FIN	Përparim Hetemaj	24	0	21+2	0	1	0
80	MF	(Belgium) BEL	Sofian Kiyine	8	0	0+7	0	0+1	0
97	MF	(Italy) ITA	Fabio Depaoli	7	0	5+1	0	0+1	0
Forwards
7	FW	(Togo) TOG	Serge Gakpé	15	1	3+12	1	0	0
31	FW	(Italy) ITA	Sergio Pellissier	31	10	18+12	9	0+1	1
45	FW	(Italy) ITA	Roberto Inglese	37	12	22+12	10	3	2
69	FW	(Italy) ITA	Riccardo Meggiorini	29	4	20+7	3	1+1	1
Players transferred out during the season
27	FW	(Italy) ITA	Vittorio Parigini	5	0	0+3	0	1+1	0
36	DF	(Italy) ITA	Filippo Costa	2	0	0+1	0	1	0
83	FW	(Italy) ITA	Antonio Floro Flores	13	0	6+6	0	1	0
95	FW	(The Gambia) GAM	Lamin Jallow	3	0	0+2	0	0+1	0

Last updated: 27 May 2017
Source: Competitions

=== Goalscorers ===
Rank	No.	Pos	Nat	Name	Serie A	Coppa Italia	Total
1	45	FW	(Italy)	Roberto Inglese	10	2	12
2	31	FW	(Italy)	Sergio Pellissier	9	1	10
3	23	MF	(Slovenia)	Valter Birsa	7	0	7
4	19	MF	(Argentina)	Lucas Castro	5	1	6
5	69	FW	(Italy)	Riccardo Meggiorini	3	1	4
6	1	MF	(Canada)	Jonathan de Guzmán	2	0	2
6	12	DF	(Slovenia)	Boštjan Cesar	1	1	2
8	4	MF	(Italy)	Nicola Rigoni	1	0	1
8	5	DF	(Italy)	Alessandro Gamberini	1	0	1
8	18	DF	(Italy)	Massimo Gobbi	1	0	1
8	28	MF	(Belgium)	Samuel Bastien	1	0	1
8	29	DF	(Italy)	Fabrizio Cacciatore	1	0	1
Own goal					1	0	1
Totals					43	6	49

Last updated: 27 May 2017

=== Clean sheets ===
Rank	No.	Pos	Nat	Name	Serie A	Coppa Italia	Total
1	70	GK	(Italy)	Stefano Sorrentino	10	1	11
2	90	GK	(Italy)	Andrea Seculin	0	1	1
Totals					10	2	12

Last updated: 27 May 2017

=== Disciplinary record ===
No.	Pos	Nat	Player	Serie A			Coppa Italia			Total		
No.	Pos	Nat	Player	Booked	(yellow card) (yellow-red card)	Sent off (straight red)	Booked	(yellow card) (yellow-red card)	Sent off (straight red)	Booked	(yellow card) (yellow-red card)	Sent off (straight red)
70	GK	(Italy)	Stefano Sorrentino	1	0	0	1	0	0	2	0	0
2	DF	(Argentina)	Nicolás Spolli	8	0	0	0	0	0	8	0	0
3	DF	(Italy)	Dario Dainelli	8	0	0	0	0	0	8	0	0
5	DF	(Italy)	Alessandro Gamberini	1	0	0	0	0	0	1	0	0
12	DF	(Slovenia)	Boštjan Cesar	8	1	0	0	0	0	8	1	0
18	DF	(Italy)	Massimo Gobbi	5	0	0	1	0	0	6	0	0
21	DF	(France)	Nicolas Frey	2	0	0	0	0	0	2	0	0
29	DF	(Italy)	Fabrizio Cacciatore	7	0	1	0	0	0	7	0	1
1	MF	(Canada)	Jonathan de Guzmán	3	0	0	0	0	0	3	0	0
4	MF	(Italy)	Nicola Rigoni	2	0	0	0	0	0	2	0	0
8	MF	(Serbia)	Ivan Radovanović	10	0	0	0	1	0	10	1	0
13	MF	(Argentina)	Mariano Julio Izco	1	0	0	0	0	0	1	0	0
19	MF	(Argentina)	Lucas Castro	5	1	0	1	0	0	6	1	0
23	MF	(Slovenia)	Valter Birsa	5	0	0	0	0	0	5	0	0
56	MF	(Finland)	Përparim Hetemaj	6	0	0	0	0	0	6	0	0
80	MF	(Belgium)	Sofian Kiyine	1	0	0	0	0	0	1	0	0
97	MF	(Italy)	Fabio Depaoli	1	1	0	0	0	0	1	1	0
7	FW	(Togo)	Serge Gakpé	1	0	0	0	0	0	1	0	0
31	FW	(Italy)	Sergio Pellissier	1	0	0	0	0	0	1	0	0
45	FW	(Italy)	Roberto Inglese	0	0	0	0	0	0	0	0	0
55	FW	(Italy)	Emanuel Vignato	0	0	0	0	0	0	0	0	0
69	FW	(Italy)	Riccardo Meggiorini	6	0	0	0	0	0	6	0	0
Totals				82	3	1	3	1	0	85	4	1

Last updated: 27 May 2017
