= 2017–18 AC ChievoVerona season =

Chievo
2017–18 season
- President: Luca Campedelli
- Manager: Rolando Maran (until 29 April 2018); Lorenzo D'Anna (from 29 April 2018)
- Stadium: Stadio Marc'Antonio Bentegodi
- Serie A: 13th
- Coppa Italia: Fourth round
- Top goalscorer: League: Roberto Inglese (12); All: Roberto Inglese (13)
- Highest home attendance: 23,700 vs Juventus (27 January 2018, Serie A)
- Lowest home attendance: 1,000 vs Ascoli (12 August 2017, Coppa Italia)
- Average home league attendance: 12,540
Home colours	Away colours	Third colours

The 2017–18 season was Associazione Calcio ChievoVerona's tenth consecutive season in Serie A. Chievo competed in Serie A, finishing 13th, and the Coppa Italia, where they were eliminated in the fourth round by city rivals Hellas Verona.

Italian striker Roberto Inglese was the club's top scorer, with 12 goals in Serie A and one in the Coppa Italia.

== Players ==
=== Squad information ===
As of 31 August 2017

Note: Flags indicate national team as defined under FIFA eligibility rules; some limited exceptions apply. Players may hold more than one non-FIFA nationality.

No.	Pos.	Nation	Player
2	DF	POL	Paweł Jaroszyński
3	DF	ITA	Dario Dainelli
4	MF	ITA	Nicola Rigoni
5	DF	ITA	Alessandro Gamberini
7	MF	ITA	Luca Garritano
8	MF	SRB	Ivan Radovanović
9	FW	POL	Mariusz Stępiński (on loan from Nantes)
10	MF	GER	Gianluca Gaudino
11	FW	FRA	Mehdi Léris
12	DF	SVN	Boštjan Cesar
14	DF	ITA	Mattia Bani
18	DF	ITA	Massimo Gobbi
19	MF	ARG	Lucas Castro
20	FW	ITA	Manuel Pucciarelli (on loan from Empoli)

No.	Pos.	Nation	Player
21	DF	FRA	Nicolas Frey (vice-captain)
23	MF	SVN	Valter Birsa
27	MF	ITA	Fabio Depaoli
29	DF	ITA	Fabrizio Cacciatore
31	FW	ITA	Sergio Pellissier (captain)
40	DF	SRB	Nenad Tomović
45	FW	ITA	Roberto Inglese
56	MF	FIN	Përparim Hetemaj
69	FW	ITA	Riccardo Meggiorini
70	GK	ITA	Stefano Sorrentino
77	MF	BEL	Samuel Bastien
90	GK	ITA	Andrea Seculin
98	GK	ITA	Alessandro Confente

== Transfers ==
=== In ===
Date	Pos.	Player	Age	Moving from	Fee	Notes	Source
30 June 2017	MF	(Germany) Gianluca Gaudino	20	(Germany) Bayern Munich	Undisclosed		

==== Loans in ====
Date	Pos.	Player	Age	Moving from	Fee	Notes	Source
11 July 2017	FW	(Italy) Manuel Pucciarelli	26	(Italy) Empoli	€5M	Loan with an obligation to buy	
31 August 2017	FW	(Poland) Mariusz Stępiński	22	(France) Nantes	Loan		
31 August 2017	DF	(Serbia) Nenad Tomović	30	(Italy) Fiorentina	€0.3M		

=== Out ===
Date	Pos.	Player	Age	Moving to	Fee	Notes	Source
1 July 2017	MF	(Netherlands) Jonathan de Guzmán	29	(Italy) Napoli	Loan return		
1 July 2017	MF	(Argentina) Mariano Julio Izco	34	Unattached		End of contract	
1 July 2017	DF	(Italy) Gennaro Sardo	38	Unattached		End of contract	
1 July 2017	DF	(Argentina) Nicolás Spolli	34	Unattached		End of contract	
10 August 2017	DF	(Switzerland) Fabio Daprelà	26	Unattached		Contract terminated by mutual consent	

==== Loans out ====
Date	Pos.	Player	Age	Moving to	Fee	Notes	Source
31 August 2017	FW	(Italy) Roberto Inglese	25	(Italy) Napoli	€12M	Player will remain on loan with Chievo for 2017–18 season	

== Competitions ==
=== Serie A ===
==== League table ====
Pos	Team	Pld	W	D	L	GF	GA	GD	Pts
11	Sassuolo	38	11	10	17	29	59	−30	43
12	Genoa	38	11	8	19	33	43	−10	41
13	Chievo	38	10	10	18	36	59	−23	40 (Note: Chievo finished ahead of Udinese on head-to-head points: Chievo 1–1 Udinese, Udinese 1–2 Chievo.)
14	Udinese	38	12	4	22	48	63	−15	40
15	Bologna	38	11	6	21	40	52	−12	39

Source: Serie A, Soccerway
Rules for classification: 1) Points; 2) Head-to-head points; 3) Head-to-head goal difference; 4) Goal difference; 5) Goals scored; 6) Draw.

==== Results summary ====
Overall								Home						Away					
Pld	W	D	L	GF	GA	GD	Pts	W	D	L	GF	GA	GD	W	D	L	GF	GA	GD
38	10	10	18	36	59	−23	40	7	6	6	22	24	−2	3	4	12	14	35	−21

Last updated: 20 May 2018.
Source: Competitive matches

==== Results by round ====
Round	1	2	3	4	5	6	7	8	9	10	11	12	13	14	15	16	17	18	19	20	21	22	23	24	25	26	27	28	29	30	31	32	33	34	35	36	37	38
Ground	A	H	A	H	A	A	H	A	H	H	A	H	A	H	A	H	A	H	A	H	A	H	A	H	H	A	H	A	A	H	A	H	A	H	A	H	A	H
Result	W	L	L	D	D	W	W	D	W	L	L	D	D	W	L	D	L	L	L	D	L	L	L	L	W	L	D	L	L	W	L	D	D	L	L	W	W	W
Position	5	10	14	12	12	10	8	9	7	10	11	11	11	9	12	12	13	13	13	13	13	13	15	16	14	14	14	15	16	15	15	16	16	17	18	15	14	13

Updated to match(es) played on 20 May 2018. Source: Competitive matches
A = Away; H = Home; W = Win; D = Draw; L = Loss

==== Matches ====
20 August 2017 1	Udinese	1–2	Chievo	Udine
20:45 CEST (UTC+02:00)	Théréau 37'; Angella (yellow card) 64'; Perica (yellow card) 71'	Report	Inglese 15'; Birsa 54'; Rigoni (yellow card) 82'; Cacciatore (yellow card) 90+2'	Stadium: Dacia Arena; Attendance: 13,000; Referee: Claudio Gavillucci

27 August 2017 2	Chievo	1–2	Lazio	Verona
20:45 CEST (UTC+02:00)	Pucciarelli 34'; Birsa (yellow card) 67'	Report	Immobile 11'; Wallace (yellow card) 66'; Milinković-Savić 89'	Stadium: Stadio Marc'Antonio Bentegodi; Attendance: 10,000; Referee: Gianluca Manganiello

9 September 2017 3	Juventus	3–0	Chievo	Turin
18:00 CEST (UTC+02:00)	Hetemaj 17' (o.g.); Mandžukić (yellow card) 52'; Higuaín 58'; Matuidi (yellow card) 79'; Dybala 83'	Report	Hetemaj (yellow card) 22'	Stadium: Allianz Stadium; Attendance: 39,457; Referee: Michael Fabbri

17 September 2017 4	Chievo	1–1	Atalanta	Verona
18:00 CEST (UTC+02:00)	Cesar (yellow card) 41'; Bastien (yellow card) 44', (goal) 52'	Report	Gómez 85' (pen.)	Stadium: Stadio Marc'Antonio Bentegodi; Attendance: 10,000; Referee: Maurizio Mariani

20 September 2017 5	Genoa	1–1	Chievo	Genoa
20:45 CEST (UTC+02:00)	Pellegri (yellow card) 41'; Laxalt 62'	Report	Hetemaj (yellow card) 38', (goal) 73'; Tomović (yellow card) 81'	Stadium: Stadio Luigi Ferraris; Attendance: 18,376; Referee: Paolo Mazzoleni

24 September 2017 6	Cagliari	0–2	Chievo	Cagliari
15:00 CEST (UTC+02:00)	Pisacane (yellow card) 64' (yellow-red card) 83'	Report	Inglese 53'; Hetemaj (yellow card) 69'; Castro (yellow card) 78'; Stępiński 90+3'	Stadium: Sardegna Arena; Attendance: 14,287; Referee: Gianluca Aureliano

1 October 2017 7	Chievo	2–1	Fiorentina	Verona
15:00 CEST (UTC+02:00)	Tomović (yellow card) 8'; Castro 25', 46'; Radovanović (yellow card) 61'	Report	Simeone 6'; Veretout (yellow card) 81'	Stadium: Stadio Marc'Antonio Bentegodi; Attendance: 10,000; Referee: Piero Giacomelli

15 October 2017 8	Sassuolo	0–0	Chievo	Reggio Emilia
15:00 CEST (UTC+02:00)	Duncan (yellow card) 62'; Gazzola (yellow card) 65'	Report		Stadium: Mapei Stadium – Città del Tricolore; Attendance: 8,712; Referee: Gianluca Manganiello

22 October 2017 9	Chievo	3–2	Hellas Verona	Verona
12:30 CEST (UTC+02:00)	Inglese 23', 30' (pen.); Hetemaj (yellow card) 49'; Gamberini (yellow card) 54'; Pellissier 73'	Report	Verde 6'; B. Zuculini (yellow card) 22' (yellow-red card) 40'; Bessa (yellow card) 49'; Pazzini 55' (pen.)	Stadium: Stadio Marc'Antonio Bentegodi; Attendance: 15,000; Referee: Rosario Abisso

25 October 2017 10	Chievo	1–4	Milan	Verona
20:45 CEST (UTC+02:00)	Hetemaj (yellow card) 14'; Birsa 61'; Meggiorini (yellow card) 83'	Report	Borini (yellow card) 12'; Suso 36'; Cesar 42' (o.g.); Çalhanoğlu 55', (yellow card) 69'; Kalinić 64'; Musacchio (yellow card) 65'	Stadium: Stadio Marc'Antonio Bentegodi; Attendance: 15,000; Referee: Marco Di Bello

29 October 2017 11	Sampdoria	4–1	Chievo	Genoa
15:00 CET (UTC+01:00)	Linetty 20', (yellow card) 78'; Torreira 26', 84'; Praet (yellow card) 40'; Zapata 44'	Report	Cacciatore 24', (yellow card) 72'; Castro (yellow card) 26'; Dainelli (yellow card) 60'	Stadium: Stadio Luigi Ferraris; Attendance: 17,972; Referee: Daniele Doveri

5 November 2017 12	Chievo	0–0	Napoli	Verona
15:00 CET (UTC+01:00)	Radovanović (yellow card) 34'	Report	Mário Rui (yellow card) 34'; Zieliński (yellow card) 53'; Koulibaly (yellow card) 81'	Stadium: Stadio Marc'Antonio Bentegodi; Attendance: 12,000; Referee: Davide Massa

19 November 2017 13	Torino	1–1	Chievo	Turin
15:00 CET (UTC+01:00)	Baselli 33'; Niang (yellow card) 88'	Report	Hetemaj 14'; Radovanović (red card) 88'; Inglese (yellow card) 90+2'	Stadium: Stadio Olimpico Grande Torino; Attendance: 15,523; Referee: Luca Banti

25 November 2017 14	Chievo	2–1	SPAL	Verona
18:00 CET (UTC+01:00)	Inglese 66', 81'	Report	Cesar 17' (o.g.); Mora (yellow card) 81'	Stadium: Stadio Marc'Antonio Bentegodi; Attendance: 10,000; Referee: Ivano Pezzuto

3 December 2017 15	Internazionale	5–0	Chievo	Milan
15:00 CET (UTC+01:00)	Perišić 23', 57', 90+2'; Icardi 38'; Ranocchia (yellow card) 56'; Škriniar 60'	Report		Stadium: San Siro; Attendance: 53,403; Referee: Gianpaolo Calvarese

10 December 2017 16	Chievo	0–0	Roma	Verona
12:30 CET (UTC+01:00)	Depaoli (yellow card) 45'	Report	Strootman (yellow card) 40'; Nainggolan (yellow card) 81'	Stadium: Stadio Marc'Antonio Bentegodi; Attendance: 15,000; Referee: Fabio Maresca

17 December 2017 17	Crotone	1–0	Chievo	Crotone
15:00 CET (UTC+01:00)	Ajeti (yellow card) 12'; Budimir 33'; Barberis (yellow card) 63'; Mandragora (yellow card) 65'; Romero (yellow card) 90+4'	Report	Bastien (yellow card) 41'; Gobbi (yellow card) 61'; Birsa (yellow card) 65'; Dainelli (yellow card) 71'	Stadium: Stadio Ezio Scida; Attendance: 8,799; Referee: Luca Pairetto

22 December 2017 18	Chievo	2–3	Bologna	Verona
18:00 CET (UTC+01:00)	Inglese 32'; Jaroszyński (yellow card) 73'; Tomović (yellow card) 77'; Cacciatore 85'	Report	Destro 4', 90'; Verdi 50'; Poli (yellow card) 60' (yellow-red card) 81'	Stadium: Stadio Marc'Antonio Bentegodi; Attendance: 7,000; Referee: Gianluca Manganiello

30 December 2017 19	Benevento	1–0	Chievo	Benevento
15:00 CET (UTC+01:00)	Coda 64'; Memushaj (yellow card) 90+2'	Report	Radovanović (yellow card) 30'; Pucciarelli (yellow card) 90+5'	Stadium: Stadio Ciro Vigorito; Attendance: 10,200; Referee: Francesco Fourneau

5 January 2018 20	Chievo	1–1	Udinese	Verona
18:00 CET (UTC+01:00)	Radovanović 9'	Report	Tomović 41' (o.g.); Barák (yellow card) 90+3'	Stadium: Stadio Marc'Antonio Bentegodi; Attendance: 8,000; Referee: Daniele Chiffi

21 January 2018 21	Lazio	5–1	Chievo	Rome
15:00 CET (UTC+01:00)	Luis Alberto 23'; Milinković-Savić 31', 68'; Lulić (yellow card) 54'; Bastos 83'; Nani 86'	Report	Pucciarelli 25'	Stadium: Stadio Olimpico; Attendance: 25,000; Referee: Rosario Abisso

27 January 2018 22	Chievo	0–2	Juventus	Verona
20:45 CET (UTC+01:00)	Bastien (yellow card) 35' (yellow-red card) 37'; Cacciatore (red card) 61'	Report	Asamoah (yellow card) 22'; Higuaín (yellow card) 32', (goal) 88'; Khedira 67'	Stadium: Stadio Marc'Antonio Bentegodi; Attendance: 23,700; Referee: Fabio Maresca

4 February 2018 23	Atalanta	1–0	Chievo	Bergamo
15:00 CET (UTC+01:00)	Mancini 72'	Report	Bani (yellow card) 90+2'	Stadium: Stadio Atleti Azzurri d'Italia; Attendance: 17,292; Referee: Gianpaolo Calvarese

11 February 2018 24	Chievo	0–1	Genoa	Verona
15:00 CET (UTC+01:00)	Castro (yellow card) 66'	Report	Spolli (yellow card) 14'; Laxalt 90+1'	Stadium: Stadio Marc'Antonio Bentegodi; Attendance: 8,500; Referee: Claudio Gavillucci

17 February 2018 25	Chievo	2–1	Cagliari	Verona
18:00 CET (UTC+01:00)	Pucciarelli (yellow card) 59'; Giaccherini 74'; Inglese 76'; Sorrentino (yellow card) 87'	Report	Pavoletti (yellow card) 51', (goal) 82'; Andreolli (yellow card) 78'; Barella (yellow card) 90+1'	Stadium: Stadio Marc'Antonio Bentegodi; Attendance: 8,000; Referee: Luigi Nasca

25 February 2018 26	Fiorentina	1–0	Chievo	Florence
15:00 CET (UTC+01:00)	Biraghi 6'; Simeone (yellow card) 26'	Report	Meggiorini (yellow card) 82'	Stadium: Stadio Artemio Franchi; Attendance: 21,225; Referee: Rosario Abisso

10 March 2018 28	Hellas Verona	1–0	Chievo	Verona
20:45 CET (UTC+01:00)	Büchel (yellow card) 29'; Caracciolo 52'; Matos (yellow card) 84'; F. Zuculini (yellow card) 90+2'; Boldor (yellow card) 90+3'	Report	Gobbi (yellow card) 63'; Bani (yellow card) 67'; Pellissier (yellow card) 73'; Radovanović (yellow card) 75'; Cacciatore (yellow card) 89'; Dainelli (yellow card) 90+2'	Stadium: Stadio Marc'Antonio Bentegodi; Attendance: 20,414; Referee: Antonio Damato

18 March 2018 29	Milan	3–2	Chievo	Milan
15:00 CET (UTC+01:00)	Çalhanoğlu 10', (yellow card) 47'; Kessié (yellow card) 44'; Cutrone 52'; Biglia (yellow card) 74'; Silva 82'	Report	Depaoli (yellow card) 17'; Stępiński 33', (yellow card) 77'; Inglese 34'; Jaroszyński (yellow card) 55'; Giaccherini (yellow card) 61'; Cacciatore (yellow card) 90+4'	Stadium: San Siro; Attendance: 49,701; Referee: Maurizio Mariani

31 March 2018 30	Chievo	2–1	Sampdoria	Verona
18:00 CEST (UTC+02:00)	Tomović (yellow card) 31'; Depaoli (yellow card) 58'; Castro 62'; Hetemaj 79'; Bani (yellow card) 84'	Report	Quagliarella 26' (pen.); Regini (yellow card) 65'; Torreira (yellow card) 86'	Stadium: Stadio Marc'Antonio Bentegodi; Attendance: 10,000; Referee: Daniele Orsato

4 April 2018 27	Chievo	1–1	Sassuolo	Verona
18:30 CEST (UTC+02:00)	Gobbi (yellow card) 42'; Giaccherini (yellow card) 45+2'; 72'; Hetemaj (yellow card) 48'; Cacciatore (yellow card) 90+4'	Report	Magnanelli (yellow card) 22' (yellow-red card) 84'; Adjapong (red card) 27'; Cassata 90+5'	Stadium: Stadio Marc'Antonio Bentegodi; Attendance: 8,000; Referee: Paolo Tagliavento
Note: Postponed due to Fiorentina player Davide Astori's death; originally scheduled for 4 March 2018.

8 April 2018 31	Napoli	2–1	Chievo	Naples
15:00 CEST (UTC+02:00)	Mário Rui (yellow card) 54'; Milik 89'; Insigne (yellow card) 90'; Diawara 90+3'	Report	Depaoli (yellow card) 12'; Giaccherini (yellow card) 55'; Stępiński 73'; Inglese (yellow card) 77'	Stadium: Stadio San Paolo; Attendance: 46,601; Referee: Gianluca Manganiello

14 April 2018 32	Chievo	0–0	Torino	Verona
18:00 CEST (UTC+02:00)	Bani (yellow card) 31' (red card) 88'; Inglese (yellow card) 90+2'	Report		Stadium: Stadio Marc'Antonio Bentegodi; Attendance: 9,000; Referee: Marco Di Bello

18 April 2018 33	SPAL	0–0	Chievo	Ferrara
20:45 CEST (UTC+02:00)	Vicari (yellow card) 15'	Report	Jaroszyński (yellow card) 41'; Gamberini (yellow card) 62'	Stadium: Stadio Paolo Mazza; Attendance: 12,436; Referee: Davide Massa

22 April 2018 34	Chievo	1–2	Internazionale	Verona
15:00 CEST (UTC+02:00)	Pucciarelli (yellow card) 75'; Stępiński 90'	Report	Cancelo (yellow card) 45+1'; Icardi 50'; Perišić 61'	Stadium: Stadio Marc'Antonio Bentegodi; Attendance: 12,000; Referee: Paolo Valeri

28 April 2018 35	Roma	4–1	Chievo	Rome
18:00 CEST (UTC+02:00)	Schick 9'; Kolarov (yellow card) 24'; Džeko 40', 67'; Juan Jesus (red card) 56'; El Shaarawy 65'; Nainggolan (yellow card) 90+2'	Report	Hetemaj (yellow card) 28'; Inglese 88'; Birsa (yellow card) 90+1'	Stadium: Stadio Olimpico; Attendance: 38,694; Referee: Gianpaolo Calvarese

6 May 2018 36	Chievo	2–1	Crotone	Verona
15:00 CEST (UTC+02:00)	Birsa 12'; Radovanović (yellow card) 42'; Rigoni (yellow card) 53'; Hetemaj (yellow card) 61'; Bani (yellow card) 78'; Stępiński 82'; Sorrentino (yellow card) 88'	Report	Faraoni (yellow card) 82'; Tumminello 90+4'	Stadium: Stadio Marc'Antonio Bentegodi; Attendance: 17,258; Referee: Davide Massa

13 May 2018 37	Bologna	1–2	Chievo	Bologna
15:00 CEST (UTC+02:00)	Verdi 12' (pen.); Helander (yellow card) 22'	Report	Hetemaj (yellow card) 14'; Dainelli (yellow card) 17'; Giaccherini 48', (yellow card) 48'; Inglese 60'; Rigoni (yellow card) 63'	Stadium: Stadio Renato Dall'Ara; Attendance: 22,581; Referee: Luca Pairetto

20 May 2018 38	Chievo	1–0	Benevento	Verona
18:00 CEST (UTC+02:00)	Inglese 49'; Radovanović (yellow card) 87'	Report		Stadium: Stadio Marc'Antonio Bentegodi; Attendance: 18,000; Referee: Fabrizio Pasqua

=== Coppa Italia ===
12 August 2017 Third round	Chievo	2–1	Ascoli	Verona
20:45 CEST (UTC+02:00)	Inglese 25'; Rigoni (yellow card) 89'; Cacciatore 90+5'	Report	Favilli 67'; Lanni (red card) 90+5'	Stadium: Stadio Marc'Antonio Bentegodi; Attendance: 1,000; Referee: Maurizio Mariani

29 November 2017 Fourth round	Chievo	1–1 (a.e.t.) (4–5 p)	Hellas Verona	Verona
18:00 CET (UTC+01:00)	Gaudino (yellow card) 5'; Pellissier 8'	Report	Fares 34'; Heurtaux (yellow card) 36'; Fossati (yellow card) 93'	Stadium: Stadio Marc'Antonio Bentegodi; Attendance: 4,000; Referee: Maurizio Mariani
	Penalties
	Pellissier (penalty missed); Cacciatore (penalty scored); Dainelli (penalty scored); Radovanović (penalty scored); Inglese (penalty scored)		(penalty scored) Rômulo; (penalty scored) Fossati; (penalty scored) Verde; (penalty scored) Tupta; (penalty scored) B. Zuculini

== Statistics ==
=== Appearances and goals ===
No.	Pos	Nat	Player	Total		Serie A		Coppa Italia	
No.	Pos	Nat	Player	Apps	Goals	Apps	Goals	Apps	Goals
Goalkeepers
1	GK	(Italy) ITA	Filippo Pavoni	0	0	0	0	0	0
70	GK	(Italy) ITA	Stefano Sorrentino	39	0	38	0	1	0
90	GK	(Italy) ITA	Andrea Seculin	1	0	0	0	1	0
98	GK	(Italy) ITA	Alessandro Confente	0	0	0	0	0	0
Defenders
2	DF	(Poland) POL	Paweł Jaroszyński	12	0	9+2	0	1	0
3	DF	(Italy) ITA	Dario Dainelli	23	0	17+4	0	1+1	0
5	DF	(Italy) ITA	Alessandro Gamberini	24	0	20+3	0	1	0
12	DF	(Slovenia) SVN	Boštjan Cesar	10	0	5+5	0	0	0
14	DF	(Italy) ITA	Mattia Bani	18	0	15+1	0	2	0
18	DF	(Italy) ITA	Massimo Gobbi	26	0	23+1	0	1+1	0
29	DF	(Italy) ITA	Fabrizio Cacciatore	35	3	32+1	2	2	1
40	DF	(Serbia) SRB	Nenad Tomović	27	0	26+1	0	0	0
Midfielders
4	MF	(Italy) ITA	Nicola Rigoni	16	0	12+3	0	1	0
8	MF	(Serbia) SRB	Ivan Radovanović	36	1	35	1	1	0
10	MF	(Germany) GER	Gianluca Gaudino	3	0	0+2	0	1	0
17	MF	(Italy) ITA	Emanuele Giaccherini	13	3	11+2	3	0	0
19	MF	(Argentina) ARG	Lucas Castro	25	3	23+2	3	0	0
23	MF	(Slovenia) SVN	Valter Birsa	36	3	29+6	3	1	0
27	MF	(Italy) ITA	Fabio Depaoli	20	0	13+6	0	1	0
56	MF	(Finland) FIN	Përparim Hetemaj	33	3	27+5	3	1	0
77	MF	(Belgium) BEL	Samuel Bastien	22	1	15+6	1	1	0
Forwards
9	FW	(Poland) POL	Mariusz Stępiński	23	5	6+16	5	1	0
11	FW	(France) FRA	Mehdi Léris	4	0	0+4	0	0	0
20	FW	(Italy) ITA	Manuel Pucciarelli	24	2	17+5	2	1+1	0
31	FW	(Italy) ITA	Sergio Pellissier	20	2	2+17	1	1	1
45	FW	(Italy) ITA	Roberto Inglese	36	13	33+1	12	1+1	1
69	FW	(Italy) ITA	Riccardo Meggiorini	15	0	10+5	0	0	0
Players transferred out during the season
7	FW	(Italy) ITA	Luca Garritano	13	0	0+11	0	1+1	0

Last updated: 20 May 2018
Source: Competitions

=== Goalscorers ===
Rank	No.	Pos	Nat	Name	Serie A	Coppa Italia	Total
1	45	FW	(Italy)	Roberto Inglese	12	1	13
2	9	FW	(Poland)	Mariusz Stępiński	5	0	5
3	17	MF	(Italy)	Emanuele Giaccherini	3	0	3
3	19	MF	(Argentina)	Lucas Castro	3	0	3
3	23	MF	(Slovenia)	Valter Birsa	3	0	3
3	29	DF	(Italy)	Fabrizio Cacciatore	2	1	3
3	56	MF	(Finland)	Përparim Hetemaj	3	0	3
8	20	FW	(Italy)	Manuel Pucciarelli	2	0	2
8	31	FW	(Italy)	Sergio Pellissier	1	1	2
10	8	MF	(Serbia)	Ivan Radovanović	1	0	1
10	77	MF	(Belgium)	Samuel Bastien	1	0	1
Own goal					0	0	0
Totals					36	3	39

Last updated: 20 May 2018

=== Clean sheets ===
Rank	No.	Pos	Nat	Name	Serie A	Coppa Italia	Total
1	70	GK	(Italy)	Stefano Sorrentino	7	0	7
Totals					7	0	7

Last updated: 20 May 2018

=== Disciplinary record ===
No.	Pos	Nat	Name	Serie A			Coppa Italia			Total		
No.	Pos	Nat	Name	Booked	(yellow card) (yellow-red card)	Sent off (straight red)	Booked	(yellow card) (yellow-red card)	Sent off (straight red)	Booked	(yellow card) (yellow-red card)	Sent off (straight red)
70	GK	(Italy)	Stefano Sorrentino	2	0	0	0	0	0	2	0	0
2	DF	(Poland)	Paweł Jaroszyński	3	0	0	0	0	0	3	0	0
3	DF	(Italy)	Dario Dainelli	4	0	0	0	0	0	4	0	0
5	DF	(Italy)	Alessandro Gamberini	2	0	0	0	0	0	2	0	0
12	DF	(Slovenia)	Boštjan Cesar	1	0	0	0	0	0	1	0	0
14	DF	(Italy)	Mattia Bani	5	0	1	0	0	0	5	0	1
18	DF	(Italy)	Massimo Gobbi	3	0	0	0	0	0	3	0	0
29	DF	(Italy)	Fabrizio Cacciatore	5	0	1	0	0	0	5	0	1
40	DF	(Serbia)	Nenad Tomović	4	0	0	0	0	0	4	0	0
4	MF	(Italy)	Nicola Rigoni	3	0	0	1	0	0	4	0	0
8	MF	(Serbia)	Ivan Radovanović	6	0	1	0	0	0	6	0	1
10	MF	(Germany)	Gianluca Gaudino	0	0	0	1	0	0	1	0	0
17	MF	(Italy)	Emanuele Giaccherini	4	0	0	0	0	0	4	0	0
19	MF	(Argentina)	Lucas Castro	3	0	0	0	0	0	3	0	0
23	MF	(Slovenia)	Valter Birsa	3	0	0	0	0	0	3	0	0
27	MF	(Italy)	Fabio Depaoli	4	0	0	0	0	0	4	0	0
56	MF	(Finland)	Përparim Hetemaj	9	0	0	0	0	0	9	0	0
77	MF	(Belgium)	Samuel Bastien	2	1	0	0	0	0	2	1	0
9	FW	(Poland)	Mariusz Stępiński	1	0	0	0	0	0	1	0	0
20	FW	(Italy)	Manuel Pucciarelli	3	0	0	0	0	0	3	0	0
31	FW	(Italy)	Sergio Pellissier	1	0	0	0	0	0	1	0	0
45	FW	(Italy)	Roberto Inglese	3	0	0	0	0	0	3	0	0
69	FW	(Italy)	Riccardo Meggiorini	2	0	0	0	0	0	2	0	0
Totals				73	1	3	2	0	0	75	1	3

Last updated: 20 May 2018
