= 2018–19 AC ChievoVerona season =

Chievo
2018–19 season
- President: Luca Campedelli
- Manager: Lorenzo D'Anna (until 9 October 2018); Gian Piero Ventura (from 10 October 2018 to 13 November 2018); Domenico Di Carlo (from 13 November 2018)
- Stadium: Stadio Marc'Antonio Bentegodi
- Serie A: 20th (relegated)
- Coppa Italia: Fourth round
- Top goalscorer: League: Mariusz Stępiński (6); All: Mariusz Stępiński (6)
Home colours	Away colours	Third colours

The 2018–19 season was Associazione Calcio ChievoVerona's eleventh consecutive season in Serie A. Chievo competed in Serie A and the Coppa Italia, having finished 13th in the league the previous season.

Lorenzo D'Anna remained as coach of the club after replacing Rolando Maran during the 2017–18 season. On 13 September, Chievo were deducted 3 points after being found guilty of false accounting.

== Players ==
=== Squad information ===
As of 17 March 2019
Appearances include league matches only

No.	Name	Nat	Position(s)	Date of birth (age)	Signed from	Signed in	Contract ends	Apps.	Goals	Notes
Goalkeepers
1	Adrian Šemper	(Croatia)	GK	12 January 1998 (age 28)	(Croatia) Dinamo Zagreb	2018	2019	0	0	Loan
16	Andrea Seculin	(Italy)	GK	14 July 1990 (age 35)	(Italy) Fiorentina	2013	2021	9	0	
70	Stefano Sorrentino	(Italy)	GK	28 March 1979 (age 47)	(Italy) Palermo	2016	2019	262	0	
Defenders
2	Ezequiel Schelotto	(Italy)	RB	23 May 1989 (age 37)	(England) Brighton & Hove Albion	2019	2019	4	0	
3	Strahinja Tanasijević	(Serbia)	CB	12 June 1997 (age 28)	(Serbia) Rad	2018	2021	1	0	
5	Federico Barba	(Italy)	CB	1 September 1993 (age 32)	(Spain) Sporting Gijón	2018	2022	23	0	
6	Nicolas Frey	(France)	RB / CB / LB	6 March 1984 (age 42)	(Italy) Modena	2008	2019	214	0	
12	Boštjan Cesar	(Slovenia)	CB	9 July 1982 (age 43)	(France) Grenoble	2010	2019	206	6	
14	Mattia Bani	(Italy)	CB	10 December 1993 (age 32)	(Italy) Pro Vercelli	2016	2020	39	0	
15	Luca Rossettini	(Italy)	CB / RB	9 May 1985 (age 41)	(Italy) Genoa	2018	2019	21	0	Loan
27	Fabio Depaoli	(Italy)	RB / RM / CM	24 April 1997 (age 29)	(Italy) Chievo Primavera	2017	2021	49	0	
33	Marco Andreolli	(Italy)	CB	10 June 1986 (age 39)	(Italy) Cagliari	2019	2019	3	0	
40	Nenad Tomović	(Serbia)	CB	30 August 1987 (age 38)	(Italy) Fiorentina	2017	2021	36	1	
44	Paweł Jaroszyński	(Poland)	LB	2 October 1994 (age 31)	(Poland) Cracovia	2017	2021	26	0	
Midfielders
4	Nicola Rigoni	(Italy)	AM	12 November 1990 (age 35)	(Italy) Vicenza	2012	2029	71	4	
8	Assane Dioussé	(Senegal)	DM / CM	20 September 1997 (age 28)	(France) Saint-Étienne	2019	2019	6	0	
13	Sofian Kiyine	(Morocco)	CM	2 October 1997 (age 28)	(Italy) Chievo Primavera	2017	2020	23	0	
17	Emanuele Giaccherini	(Italy)	LM / LW	5 May 1985 (age 41)	(Italy) Napoli	2018	2021	35	6	
56	Përparim Hetemaj	(Finland)	CM	12 December 1986 (age 39)	(Italy) Brescia	2011	2020	231	5	Vice-captain
Forwards
7	Lucas Piazon	(Brazil)	RW / LW / AM	20 January 1994 (age 32)	(England) Chelsea	2019	2019	2	0	
9	Mariusz Stępiński	(Poland)	ST	12 May 1995 (age 31)	(France) Nantes	2017	2021	49	11	
10	Manuel Pucciarelli	(Italy)	SS / AM	17 June 1991 (age 34)	(Italy) Empoli	2017	2019	27	2	Loan
11	Mehdi Léris	(France)	LW / AM / SS / ST	23 May 1998 (age 28)	(Italy) Chievo Primavera	2017	2019	19	0	
20	Filip Đorđević	(Serbia)	ST	28 September 1987 (age 38)	(Italy) Lazio	2018	2021	13	1	
31	Sergio Pellissier	(Italy)	ST	12 April 1979 (age 47)	(Italy) Torino	2000	2019	491	134	Captain
55	Emanuel Vignato	(Italy)	RW / AM	24 August 2000 (age 25)	(Italy) Chievo Primavera	2017	2020	3	0	
69	Riccardo Meggiorini	(Italy)	SS	4 September 1985 (age 40)	(Italy) Torino	2014	2020	116	14	
Players transferred during the season
8	Ivan Radovanović	(Serbia)	DM	29 August 1988 (age 37)	(Italy) Atalanta	2013	2022	179	2	3rd captain
22	Joel Obi	(Nigeria)	CM / LM / RM	22 May 1991 (age 35)	(Italy) Torino	2018	2021	11	1	
23	Valter Birsa	(Slovenia)	AM / RW	7 August 1986 (age 39)	(Italy) Milan	2014	2021	157	18	
29	Fabrizio Cacciatore	(Italy)	RB	8 October 1986 (age 39)	(Italy) Sampdoria	2015	2020	98	4	
66	Gianluca Gaudino	(Germany)	CM	11 November 1996 (age 29)	(Germany) Bayern Munich	2017	2021	2	0	

== Transfers ==
=== In ===
Date	Pos.	Player	Age	Moving from	Fee	Notes	Source
28 May 2018	FW	(Poland) Mariusz Stępiński	23	(France) Nantes	€2.5M	Option to buy exercised	
15 June 2018	DF	(Serbia) Nenad Tomović	30	(Italy) Fiorentina	€2.5M	Option to buy exercised	
1 July 2018	FW	(Serbia) Filip Đorđević	30	(Italy) Lazio	Free	End of contract	
4 July 2018	MF	(Italy) Emanuele Giaccherini	33	(Italy) Napoli	Undisclosed	Option to buy exercised	
11 August 2018	MF	(Nigeria) Joel Obi	27	(Italy) Torino	Undisclosed		
14 August 2018	DF	(Italy) Federico Barba	24	(Spain) Sporting Gijón	€3M		

==== Loans in ====
Date	Pos.	Player	Age	Moving from	Fee	Notes	Source
9 August 2018	GK	(Croatia) Adrian Šemper	20	(Croatia) Dinamo Zagreb	Loan	Loan with an option to buy	

=== Out ===
Date	Pos.	Player	Age	Moving to	Fee	Notes	Source
14 June 2018	MF	(Belgium) Samuel Bastien	21	(Belgium) Standard Liège	€3M		
30 June 2018	MF	(Argentina) Lucas Castro	29	(Italy) Cagliari	€6.5M		
1 July 2018	FW	(Italy) Roberto Inglese	26	(Italy) Napoli	Free	Loan return	

==== Loans out ====
Date	Pos.	Player	Age	Moving to	Fee	Notes	Source

== Competitions ==
=== Serie A ===
==== League table ====
Pos	Team	Pld	W	D	L	GF	GA	GD	Pts	Qualification or relegation
16	Fiorentina	38	8	17	13	47	45	+2	41 (Note: Positions determined by head-to-head points: Parma: 9 pts; Cagliari: 7 pts; Fiorentina: 1 pt.)	
17	Genoa	38	8	14	16	39	57	−18	38 (Note: Genoa finished ahead of Empoli on head-to-head points: Genoa 2–1 Empoli, Empoli 1–3 Genoa.)	
18	Empoli (R)	38	10	8	20	51	70	−19	38	Relegation to Serie B
19	Frosinone (R)	38	5	10	23	29	69	−40	25	Relegation to Serie B
20	Chievo (R)	38	2	14	22	25	75	−50	17 (Note: Chievo were deducted 3 points after being found guilty of false accounting.)	Relegation to Serie B

Source: Serie A, Soccerway
Rules for classification: 1) Points; 2) Head-to-head points; 3) Head-to-head goal difference; 4) Goal difference; 5) Goals scored; 6) Draw. (Note: Head-to-head record is used only after all the matches between the teams in question have been played).
(R) Relegated

==== Results summary ====
Overall								Home						Away					
Pld	W	D	L	GF	GA	GD	Pts	W	D	L	GF	GA	GD	W	D	L	GF	GA	GD
38	2	14	22	25	75	−50	20	1	7	11	14	37	−23	1	7	11	11	38	−27

Last updated: 25 May 2019.
Source: Competitive matches

==== Results by round ====
Round	1	2	3	4	5	6	7	8	9	10	11	12	13	14	15	16	17	18	19	20	21	22	23	24	25	26	27	28	29	30	31	32	33	34	35	36	37	38
Ground	H	A	H	A	H	A	H	A	H	A	H	H	A	H	A	A	H	A	H	A	H	A	H	A	H	A	H	A	H	A	A	H	A	H	H	A	H	A
Result	L	L	D	D	L	L	L	L	L	L	L	D	D	D	D	D	D	L	W	L	L	D	L	L	D	L	L	D	L	L	L	L	W	D	L	L	D	D
Position	14	20	20	20	20	20	20	20	20	20	20	20	20	20	20	20	20	20	20	20	20	20	20	20	20	20	20	20	20	20	20	20	20	20	20	20	20	20

Updated to match(es) played on 25 May 2019. Source: Competitive matches
A = Away; H = Home; W = Win; D = Draw; L = Loss

==== Matches ====
18 August 2018 1	Chievo	2–3	Juventus	Verona
18:00 CEST (UTC+02:00)	Stępiński 38'; Giaccherini 56' (pen.); Radovanović (yellow card) 60'; Tomović (yellow card) 90+5'	Report	Khedira 3'; Bani 75' (o.g.); Bernardeschi 90+3'	Stadium: Stadio Marc'Antonio Bentegodi; Attendance: 28,375; Referee: Fabrizio Pasqua

26 August 2018 2	Fiorentina	6–1	Chievo	Florence
20:30 CEST (UTC+02:00)	Milenković 8'; Fernandes (yellow card) 39'; Gerson 42'; Benassi 49', 90'; Chiesa 71'; Simeone 90+3'	Report	Depaoli (yellow card) 66'; Tomović 76'; Meggiorini (yellow card) 82'; Radovanović (yellow card) 85'	Stadium: Stadio Artemio Franchi; Attendance: 27,790; Referee: Rosario Abisso

2 September 2018 3	Chievo	0–0	Empoli	Verona
20:30 CEST (UTC+02:00)	Rigoni (yellow card) 55'	Report	Di Lorenzo (yellow card) 90+3'	Stadium: Stadio Marc'Antonio Bentegodi; Attendance: 10,200; Referee: Piero Giacomelli

16 September 2018 4	Roma	2–2	Chievo	Rome
12:30 CEST (UTC+02:00)	El Shaarawy 10'; Cristante 30'; De Rossi (yellow card) 78'	Report	Birsa 52'; Rossettini (yellow card) 74'; Stępiński 83'	Stadium: Stadio Olimpico; Attendance: 39,849; Referee: Paolo Mazzoleni

23 September 2018 5	Chievo	0–2	Udinese	Verona
15:00 CEST (UTC+02:00)	Giaccherini (yellow card) 90+3'	Report	De Paul 76'; Behrami (yellow card) 83'; Lasagna 90'	Stadium: Stadio Marc'Antonio Bentegodi; Attendance: 10,700; Referee: Luca Pairetto

26 September 2018 6	Genoa	2–0	Chievo	Genoa
21:00 CEST (UTC+02:00)	Criscito (yellow card) 12'; Kouamé (yellow card) 15'; Pandev (yellow card) 31', (goal) 54'; Piątek (yellow card) 37', (goal) 42'	Report	Léris (yellow card) 3'; Hetemaj (yellow card) 30'; Depaoli (yellow card) 56'; Rossettini (yellow card) 85'	Stadium: Stadio Luigi Ferraris; Attendance: 18,969; Referee: Fabrizio Pasqua

30 September 2018 7	Chievo	0–1	Torino	Verona
15:00 CEST (UTC+02:00)	Rossettini (yellow card) 41'; Radovanović (yellow card) 57'; Stępiński (yellow card) 71'	Report	Nkoulou (yellow card) 6'; Aina (yellow card) 61'; Rincón (yellow card) 70'; Zaza 88'	Stadium: Stadio Marc'Antonio Bentegodi; Attendance: 10,500; Referee: Marco Guida

7 October 2018 8	Milan	3–1	Chievo	Milan
15:00 CEST (UTC+02:00)	Higuaín 27', 34', (yellow card) 69'; Bonaventura 56'	Report	Barba (yellow card) 62'; Pellissier 63'	Stadium: San Siro; Attendance: 48,088; Referee: Gianpaolo Calvarese

21 October 2018 9	Chievo	1–5	Atalanta	Verona
15:00 CEST (UTC+02:00)	Barba (yellow card) 3' (yellow-red card) 40'; Birsa 84' (pen.); Bani (yellow card) 86'	Report	De Roon 25'; Iličić 28', 50', 52'; Gosens 72'; Mancini (yellow card) 77'	Stadium: Stadio Marc'Antonio Bentegodi; Attendance: 11,100; Referee: Gianluca Rocchi

28 October 2018 10	Cagliari	2–1	Chievo	Cagliari
15:00 CET (UTC+01:00)	Pavoletti 15'; Castro 59'; Cerri (yellow card) 90'	Report	Giaccherini (yellow card) 28'; Rossettini (yellow card) 41'; Rigoni (yellow card) 56'; Meggiorini (yellow card) 63'; Stępiński 79', (yellow card) 90+2'; Kiyine (yellow card) 84'	Stadium: Sardegna Arena; Attendance: 15,805; Referee: Marco Piccinini

4 November 2018 11	Chievo	0–2	Sassuolo	Verona
15:00 CET (UTC+01:00)	Obi (yellow card) 14'; Kiyine (yellow card) 35'; Depaoli (yellow card) 65'; Tanasijević (yellow card) 85' (yellow-red card) 88'	Report	Ferrari (yellow card) 20'; Berardi (yellow card) 37'; Di Francesco 42'; Giaccherini 90+4' (o.g.)	Stadium: Stadio Marc'Antonio Bentegodi; Attendance: 10,000; Referee: Gianluca Aureliano

11 November 2018 12	Chievo	2–2	Bologna	Verona
15:00 CET (UTC+01:00)	Meggiorini (yellow card) 5', (goal) 20' (pen.); Bani (yellow card) 15'; Obi 45'; Kiyine (yellow card) 61'	Report	Santander 5'; Calabresi (yellow card) 19'; Helander (yellow card) 38'; Krejčí (yellow card) 51'; Orsolini 56'	Stadium: Stadio Marc'Antonio Bentegodi; Attendance: 9,500; Referee: Daniele Orsato

25 November 2018 13	Napoli	0–0	Chievo	Naples
15:00 CET (UTC+01:00)	Diawara (yellow card) 21'; Mário Rui (yellow card) 84'	Report	Barba (yellow card) 57'; Hetemaj (yellow card) 78'	Stadium: Stadio San Paolo; Attendance: 44,408; Referee: Daniele Chiffi

2 December 2018 14	Chievo	1–1	Lazio	Verona
18:00 CET (UTC+01:00)	Depaoli (yellow card) 22'; Pellissier 25'; Radovanović (yellow card) 51'; Rossettini (yellow card) 60'; Cacciatore (yellow card) 90+5'	Report	Radu (yellow card) 29'; Immobile 66'; Correa (yellow card) 90+4'	Stadium: Stadio Marc'Antonio Bentegodi; Attendance: 11,500; Referee: Fabio Maresca

9 December 2018 15	Parma	1–1	Chievo	Parma
15:00 CET (UTC+01:00)	Rigoni (yellow card) 7'; Barillà (yellow card) 27'; Gagliolo (yellow card) 31'; Alves 53'; Biabiany (yellow card) 58'	Report	Depaoli (yellow card) 4' (yellow-red card) 73'; Hetemaj (yellow card) 35'; Stępiński 46'; Tanasijević (yellow card) 90'	Stadium: Stadio Ennio Tardini; Attendance: 13,994; Referee: Federico La Penna
Note: Strahinja Tanasijević was cautioned for dissent while a substitute.

16 December 2018 16	SPAL	0–0	Chievo	Ferrara
12:30 CET (UTC+01:00)	Missiroli (yellow card) 68'; Floccari (yellow card) 90+4'	Report	Jaroszyński (yellow card) 45+3'; Radovanović (yellow card) 59'; Bani (yellow card) 67'; Birsa (yellow card) 73'	Stadium: Stadio Paolo Mazza; Attendance: 11,882; Referee: Luca Banti

22 December 2018 17	Chievo	1–1	Internazionale	Verona
18:00 CET (UTC+01:00)	Kiyine (yellow card) 30'; Hetemaj (yellow card) 41'; Rigoni (yellow card) 61'; Pellissier 90+1'	Report	Perišić 39'; João Mário (yellow card) 53'; Brozović (yellow card) 59'	Stadium: Stadio Marc'Antonio Bentegodi; Attendance: 19,750; Referee: Fabrizio Pasqua

26 December 2018 18	Sampdoria	2–0	Chievo	Genoa
15:00 CET (UTC+01:00)	Quagliarella 47'; Andersen (yellow card) 56'; Ramírez 59', (yellow card) 84'	Report	Cesar (yellow card) 74'	Stadium: Stadio Luigi Ferraris; Attendance: 19,190; Referee: Antonio Giua

29 December 2018 19	Chievo	1–0	Frosinone	Verona
15:00 CET (UTC+01:00)	Pellissier (yellow card) 46'; Giaccherini (yellow card) 51', (goal) 76'; Bani (yellow card) 64'; Radovanović (yellow card) 68'	Report	Crisetig (yellow card) 10'; Pinamonti (yellow card) 49'; Capuano (yellow card) 58' (yellow-red card) 58'; Ciano (yellow card) 69'; Beghetto (yellow card) 75'	Stadium: Stadio Marc'Antonio Bentegodi; Attendance: 9,800; Referee: Gianluca Rocchi

21 January 2019 20	Juventus	3–0	Chievo	Turin
19:00 CET (UTC+01:00)	Douglas Costa 13'; Can 45'; De Sciglio (yellow card) 80'; Rugani 84'	Report	Bani (yellow card) 51'; Kiyine (yellow card) 83'	Stadium: Allianz Stadium; Attendance: 30,239; Referee: Marco Piccinini

27 January 2019 21	Chievo	3–4	Fiorentina	Verona
12:30 CET (UTC+01:00)	Giaccherini (yellow card) 25'; Sorrentino (yellow card) 27'; Stępiński 38'; Rigoni (yellow card) 47'; Pellissier 60' (pen.); Đorđević 89'	Report	Muriel 4'; Benassi (yellow card) 19' (red card) 60', (goal) 26'; Chiesa 79', 86'	Stadium: Stadio Marc'Antonio Bentegodi; Attendance: 11,000; Referee: Daniele Chiffi

2 February 2019 22	Empoli	2–2	Chievo	Empoli
15:00 CET (UTC+01:00)	Caputo 45+2', 52'	Report	Jaroszyński (yellow card) 25'; Giaccherini 31'; Stępiński 45+1'; Barba (yellow card) 90+2'	Stadium: Stadio Carlo Castellani; Attendance: 7,030; Referee: Marco Di Bello

8 February 2019 23	Chievo	0–3	Roma	Verona
20:30 CET (UTC+01:00)	Barba (yellow card) 21'	Report	El Shaarawy 9'; Cristante (yellow card) 14'; Zaniolo (yellow card) 17'; Džeko 18'; Kolarov 51'	Stadium: Stadio Marc'Antonio Bentegodi; Attendance: 12,500; Referee: Rosario Abisso

17 February 2019 24	Udinese	1–0	Chievo	Udine
15:00 CET (UTC+01:00)	Pussetto (yellow card) 65'; Nuytinck (yellow card) 71'; Fofana (yellow card) 75'; Teodorczyk 85', (yellow card) 87'; Zeegelaar (yellow card) 90'	Report	Léris (yellow card) 15'; Depaoli (yellow card) 58'; Đorđević (yellow card) 85'; Giaccherini (yellow card) 87'	Stadium: Dacia Arena; Attendance: 18,008; Referee: Paolo Valeri

24 February 2019 25	Chievo	0–0	Genoa	Verona
15:00 CET (UTC+01:00)	Kiyine (yellow card) 36'; Hetemaj (yellow card) 84'	Report	Lerager (yellow card) 26'; Kouamé (yellow card) 85'; Biraschi (yellow card) 90+4'	Stadium: Stadio Marc'Antonio Bentegodi; Attendance: 10,500; Referee: Manuel Volpi

3 March 2019 26	Torino	3–0	Chievo	Turin
12:30 CET (UTC+01:00)	Lukić (yellow card) 33'; Belotti 76'; Rincón 90+2'; Zaza 90+3'	Report	Dioussé (yellow card) 68'; Rigoni (yellow card) 73'; Bani (yellow card) 78'; Stępiński (yellow card) 86'	Stadium: Stadio Olimpico Grande Torino; Attendance: 25,269; Referee: Federico La Penna

9 March 2019 27	Chievo	1–2	Milan	Verona
20:30 CET (UTC+01:00)	Hetemaj 41', (yellow card) 90+5'; Giaccherini (yellow card) 60'; Sorrentino (yellow card) 71'	Report	Biglia 31'; Conti (yellow card) 52'; Piątek 57'	Stadium: Stadio Marc'Antonio Bentegodi; Attendance: 26,500; Referee: Luca Pairetto

17 March 2019 28	Atalanta	1–1	Chievo	Bergamo
15:00 CET (UTC+01:00)	De Roon (yellow card) 28'; Iličić 55'	Report	Meggiorini (yellow card) 5', (goal) 32'; Dioussé (yellow card) 35'; Hetemaj (yellow card) 45+1'; Cesar (yellow card) 63'; Depaoli (yellow card) 74'; Andreolli (yellow card) 74'; Giaccherini (yellow card) 90+6'	Stadium: Stadio Atleti Azzurri d'Italia; Attendance: 18,537; Referee: Massimiliano Irrati

29 March 2019 29	Chievo	0–3	Cagliari	Verona
20:30 CEST (UTC+02:00)	Depaoli (yellow card) 22' (yellow-red card) 52'; Léris (yellow card) 59'; Meggiorini (yellow card) 62'; Bani (yellow card) 71'; Giaccherini (yellow card) 87'	Report	Pisacane 16'; João Pedro 33'; Ioniță 43'; Faragò (yellow card) 54'; Cerri (yellow card) 72'; Cigarini (yellow card) 87'	Stadium: Stadio Marc'Antonio Bentegodi; Attendance: 10,000; Referee: Rosario Abisso

4 April 2019 30	Sassuolo	4–0	Chievo	Reggio Emilia
19:00 CEST (UTC+02:00)	Demiral 4', 45'; Peluso (yellow card) 31'; Locatelli 47'; Berardi 57'	Report	Kiyine (yellow card) 33'	Stadium: Mapei Stadium – Città del Tricolore; Attendance: 9,193; Referee: Lorenzo Maggioni

8 April 2019 31	Bologna	3–0	Chievo	Bologna
20:30 CEST (UTC+02:00)	Lyanco (yellow card) 34'; Pulgar 65' (pen.), 68' (pen.); Dijks 89'	Report	Andreolli (yellow card) 12'; Léris (yellow card) 26'; Depaoli (yellow card) 44'; Rigoni (yellow card) 49'; Dioussé (yellow card) 61'; Stępiński (yellow card) 63'; Bani (yellow card) 73' (yellow-red card) 79'	Stadium: Stadio Renato Dall'Ara; Attendance: 19,107; Referee: Luca Pairetto

14 April 2019 32	Chievo	1–3	Napoli	Verona
18:00 CEST (UTC+02:00)	Cesar 90'	Report	Koulibaly 15', 81'; Milik 64'	Stadium: Stadio Marc'Antonio Bentegodi; Attendance: 13,500; Referee: Federico La Penna

20 April 2019 33	Lazio	1–2	Chievo	Rome
15:00 CEST (UTC+02:00)	Milinković-Savić (red card) 34'; Caicedo 67'	Report	Depaoli (yellow card) 40'; Vignato 49'; Hetemaj 51', (yellow card) 90+4'; Rigoni (yellow card) 55'; Dioussé (yellow card) 73'	Stadium: Stadio Olimpico; Attendance: 33,012; Referee: Daniele Chiffi

28 April 2019 34	Chievo	1–1	Parma	Verona
15:00 CEST (UTC+02:00)	Cesar (yellow card) 32'; Léris (yellow card) 37'; Meggiorini 66'; Barba (yellow card) 72'	Report	Kucka 38'; Gazzola (yellow card) 67'; Alves (yellow card) 80'; Gervinho (yellow card) 90+3'	Stadium: Stadio Marc'Antonio Bentegodi; Attendance: 11,200; Referee: Juan Luca Sacchi

4 May 2019 35	Chievo	0–4	SPAL	Verona
18:00 CEST (UTC+02:00)	Depaoli (yellow card) 18'; Meggiorini (yellow card) 57'; Dioussé (yellow card) 60'	Report	Felipe 8', 55'; Floccari 47'; Kurtić 81'	Stadium: Stadio Marc'Antonio Bentegodi; Attendance: 4,500; Referee: Riccardo Ros

13 May 2019 36	Internazionale	2–0	Chievo	Milan
21:00 CEST (UTC+02:00)	Valero (yellow card) 18'; Politano 39'; Perišić (yellow card) 70', (goal) 86'	Report	Grubac (yellow card) 26'; Rigoni (yellow card) 36' (yellow-red card) 76'	Stadium: San Siro; Attendance: 57,855; Referee: Paolo Valeri

19 May 2019 37	Chievo	0–0	Sampdoria	Verona
12:30 CEST (UTC+02:00)	Stępiński (yellow card) 32'; Barba (red card) 40'; Hetemaj (yellow card) 70'; Pucciarelli (yellow card) 85'	Report		Stadium: Stadio Marc'Antonio Bentegodi; Attendance: 10,600; Referee: Gianluca Aureliano

25 May 2019 38	Frosinone	0–0	Chievo	Frosinone
18:00 CEST (UTC+02:00)	Valzania (yellow card) 33'; Ciano (yellow card) 52'	Report	Depaoli (yellow card) 36'; Rigoni (yellow card) 90'	Stadium: Stadio Benito Stirpe; Attendance: 12,167; Referee: Antonio Di Martino

=== Coppa Italia ===
12 August 2018 Third round	Chievo	1–0	Pescara	Verona
18:00 CEST (UTC+02:00)	Rigoni 55'	Report	Gravillon (yellow card) 72'	Stadium: Stadio Marc'Antonio Bentegodi; Attendance: 1,838; Referee: Paolo Mazzoleni

5 December 2018 Fourth round	Chievo	1–2	Cagliari	Verona
20:45 CET (UTC+01:00)	Léris 18'; Rigoni (yellow card) 34'; Cesar (yellow card) 79'; Rossettini (yellow card) 90+1'	Report	Cerri 8'; Farias (yellow card) 35'; Pisacane 68'	Stadium: Stadio Marc'Antonio Bentegodi; Attendance: 1,000; Referee: Luigi Nasca

== Statistics ==
=== Appearances and goals ===
No.	Pos	Nat	Player	Total		Serie A		Coppa Italia	
No.	Pos	Nat	Player	Apps	Goals	Apps	Goals	Apps	Goals
Goalkeepers
1	GK	(Croatia) CRO	Adrian Šemper	6	0	6	0	0	0
16	GK	(Italy) ITA	Andrea Seculin	3	0	1+1	0	1	0
70	GK	(Italy) ITA	Stefano Sorrentino	31	0	31	0	0	0
Defenders
2	DF	(Italy) ITA	Ezequiel Schelotto	4	0	2+2	0	0	0
3	DF	(Serbia) SRB	Strahinja Tanasijević	1	0	0+1	0	0	0
5	DF	(Italy) ITA	Federico Barba	30	0	29+1	0	0	0
6	DF	(France) FRA	Nicolas Frey	5	0	3+2	0	0	0
12	DF	(Slovenia) SVN	Boštjan Cesar	14	1	11+3	1	0	0
14	DF	(Italy) ITA	Mattia Bani	31	0	29+1	0	0+1	0
15	DF	(Italy) ITA	Luca Rossettini	22	0	20+1	0	1	0
33	DF	(Italy) ITA	Marco Andreolli	8	0	7+1	0	0	0
40	DF	(Serbia) SRB	Nenad Tomović	11	1	9+1	1	1	0
43	DF	(Albania) ALB	Angelo Ndrecka	1	0	1	0	0	0
44	DF	(Poland) POL	Paweł Jaroszyński	20	0	15+4	0	1	0
Midfielders
4	MF	(Italy) ITA	Nicola Rigoni	25	1	23+1	0	1	1
7	MF	(Brazil) BRA	Lucas Piazon	4	0	0+4	0	0	0
8	MF	(Senegal) SEN	Assane Dioussé	14	0	9+5	0	0	0
13	MF	(Morocco) MAR	Sofian Kiyine	24	0	9+14	0	0+1	0
17	MF	(Italy) ITA	Emanuele Giaccherini	27	3	22+4	3	1	0
18	MF	(Guinea) GUI	Ibrahim Karamoko	2	0	0+2	0	0	0
19	MF	(The Gambia) GAM	Musa Juwara	1	0	0+1	0	0	0
21	MF	(Argentina) ARG	Mauro Burruchaga	1	0	0+1	0	0	0
27	MF	(Italy) ITA	Fabio Depaoli	33	0	27+6	0	0	0
56	MF	(Finland) FIN	Përparim Hetemaj	31	2	25+5	2	1	0
Forwards
9	FW	(Poland) POL	Mariusz Stępiński	36	6	27+8	6	1	0
10	FW	(Italy) ITA	Manuel Pucciarelli	10	0	3+7	0	0	0
11	FW	(France) FRA	Mehdi Léris	23	0	18+5	0	0	0
20	FW	(Serbia) SRB	Filip Đorđević	13	1	6+7	1	0	0
25	FW	(Montenegro) MNE	Sergej Grubac	3	0	2+1	0	0	0
31	FW	(Italy) ITA	Sergio Pellissier	19	4	12+7	4	0	0
55	FW	(Italy) ITA	Emanuel Vignato	10	1	8+2	1	0	0
69	FW	(Italy) ITA	Riccardo Meggiorini	25	3	18+6	3	0+1	0
Players transferred out during the season
8	MF	(Serbia) SRB	Ivan Radovanović	20	0	19	0	1	0
22	MF	(Nigeria) NGA	Joel Obi	11	1	9+2	1	0	0
23	MF	(Slovenia) SVN	Valter Birsa	18	2	12+5	2	1	0
29	DF	(Italy) ITA	Fabrizio Cacciatore	8	0	5+2	0	1	0

Last updated: 25 May 2019
Source: Competitions

=== Goalscorers ===
Rank	No.	Pos	Nat	Name	Serie A	Coppa Italia	Total
1	9	FW	(Poland)	Mariusz Stępiński	6	0	6
2	31	FW	(Italy)	Sergio Pellissier	4	0	4
3	17	MF	(Italy)	Emanuele Giaccherini	3	0	3
3	69	FW	(Italy)	Riccardo Meggiorini	3	0	3
5	23	MF	(Slovenia)	Valter Birsa	2	0	2
5	56	MF	(Finland)	Përparim Hetemaj	2	0	2
7	4	MF	(Italy)	Nicola Rigoni	0	1	1
7	12	DF	(Slovenia)	Boštjan Cesar	1	0	1
7	20	FW	(Serbia)	Filip Đorđević	1	0	1
7	22	MF	(Nigeria)	Joel Obi	1	0	1
7	40	DF	(Serbia)	Nenad Tomović	1	0	1
7	55	FW	(Italy)	Emanuel Vignato	1	0	1
Own goal					0	0	0
Totals					25	1	26

Last updated: 25 May 2019

=== Clean sheets ===
Rank	No.	Pos	Nat	Name	Serie A	Coppa Italia	Total
1	70	GK	(Italy)	Stefano Sorrentino	5	0	5
2	1	GK	(Croatia)	Adrian Šemper	2	0	2
3	16	GK	(Italy)	Andrea Seculin	0	1	1
Totals					7	1	8

Last updated: 25 May 2019

=== Disciplinary record ===
No.	Pos	Nat	Name	Serie A			Coppa Italia			Total		
No.	Pos	Nat	Name	Booked	(yellow card) (yellow-red card)	Sent off (straight red)	Booked	(yellow card) (yellow-red card)	Sent off (straight red)	Booked	(yellow card) (yellow-red card)	Sent off (straight red)
70	GK	(Italy)	Stefano Sorrentino	2	0	0	0	0	0	2	0	0
3	DF	(Serbia)	Strahinja Tanasijević	1	1	0	0	0	0	1	1	0
5	DF	(Italy)	Federico Barba	5	1	1	0	0	0	5	1	1
12	DF	(Slovenia)	Boštjan Cesar	3	0	0	1	0	0	4	0	0
14	DF	(Italy)	Mattia Bani	7	1	0	0	0	0	7	1	0
15	DF	(Italy)	Luca Rossettini	5	0	0	1	0	0	6	0	0
29	DF	(Italy)	Fabrizio Cacciatore	1	0	0	0	0	0	1	0	0
33	DF	(Italy)	Marco Andreolli	2	0	0	0	0	0	2	0	0
40	DF	(Serbia)	Nenad Tomović	1	0	0	0	0	0	1	0	0
44	DF	(Poland)	Paweł Jaroszyński	2	0	0	0	0	0	2	0	0
4	MF	(Italy)	Nicola Rigoni	8	1	0	1	0	0	9	1	0
8	MF	(Senegal)	Assane Dioussé	5	0	0	0	0	0	5	0	0
8	MF	(Serbia)	Ivan Radovanović	6	0	0	0	0	0	6	0	0
13	MF	(Morocco)	Sofian Kiyine	7	0	0	0	0	0	7	0	0
17	MF	(Italy)	Emanuele Giaccherini	8	0	0	0	0	0	8	0	0
22	MF	(Nigeria)	Joel Obi	1	0	0	0	0	0	1	0	0
23	MF	(Slovenia)	Valter Birsa	1	0	0	0	0	0	1	0	0
27	MF	(Italy)	Fabio Depaoli	10	2	0	0	0	0	10	2	0
56	MF	(Finland)	Përparim Hetemaj	9	0	0	0	0	0	9	0	0
9	FW	(Poland)	Mariusz Stępiński	5	0	0	0	0	0	5	0	0
10	FW	(Italy)	Manuel Pucciarelli	1	0	0	0	0	0	1	0	0
11	FW	(France)	Mehdi Léris	5	0	0	0	0	0	5	0	0
20	FW	(Serbia)	Filip Đorđević	1	0	0	0	0	0	1	0	0
25	FW	(Cyprus)	Sergej Grubač	1	0	0	0	0	0	1	0	0
31	FW	(Italy)	Sergio Pellissier	1	0	0	0	0	0	1	0	0
69	FW	(Italy)	Riccardo Meggiorini	6	0	0	0	0	0	6	0	0
Totals				95	6	1	3	0	0	98	6	1

Last updated: 25 May 2019
