= Yusupha Bobb =

Gambian professional footballer

Personal information
- Date of birth: 22 June 1996 (age 30)
- Place of birth: Banjul, The Gambia
- Height: 1.75 m (5 ft 9 in)
- Position: Midfielder

Senior career*
Years	Team	Apps	(Gls)
2013–2015	Banjul Hawks		
2015–2019	Chievo	0	(0)
2015–2016	→ Cittadella (loan)	12	(1)
2016–2017	→ Taranto (loan)	14	(0)
2017	→ Padova (loan)	4	(0)
2017–2018	→ Reggiana (loan)	21	(1)
2018–2019	→ Cuneo (loan)	32	(3)
2019–2020	Lecco	17	(1)
2021	Livorno	7	(0)
2021–2022	Piacenza	23	(2)

International career^{‡}
- Gambia U19
- Gambia U20
2017–	Gambia	8	(0)
- * Club domestic league appearances and goals as of 24 April 2022 ‡ National team caps and goals as of 11 June 2021

Yusupha Bobb (born 22 June 1996) is a Gambian professional footballer who plays as a midfielder for the Gambia national team.

== Club career ==
Bobb's career started in The Gambia with local team Banjul Hawks. In 2015, Bobb joined Serie A side Chievo. On 24 July 2015, Bobb completed a loan move to Lega Pro club Cittadella, he subsequently made his Cittadella and professional debut on 2 August in a Coppa Italia match against Potenza; Cittadella won 15–0 as Bobb scored twice. Three matches later, Bobb scored his first goal in professional league football with a strike against Pavia. He suffered a serious leg injury in a match against Cuneo on 17 January 2016 and subsequently did not feature for Cittadella again prior to returning to Chievo at the end of the 2015–16 campaign.

He was named on the Chievo substitutes bench on 13 August 2016 for a cup tie against Virtus Entella. At the end of August, Bobb joined Taranto on loan, again in Lega Pro. His debut for them came on 11 September in a goalless draw versus Siracusa. In total, he played fourteen times for the club. In 2017, Bobb signed for Padova of Lega Pro on loan. He played five times before returning to his parent team. On 12 July, ahead of the 2017–18 season, Bobb joined Reggiana on a temporary basis. He was loaned out for a fifth occasion in July 2018, joining Cuneo. His first goal arrived on 21 October away to Pro Piacenza, as they won 1–0.

On 19 October 2019, having left Chievo, Bobb headed back to Serie C with Lecco.

On 11 February 2021, he signed with Serie C club Livorno. Following Livorno's relegation and exclusion from football, he joined Piacenza following a successful trial.

== International career ==
Bobb has represented The Gambia at U19 and U20 level. He was called up on numerous occasions to the senior squad, including twice being an unused substitute in 2014 FIFA World Cup qualifying games against Morocco and Ivory Coast respectively. In November 2017, Bobb was called up for Gambia's friendly with Morocco. He made his debut in a 2–0 win in Rabat. He played in the 2021 Africa cup of Nations, his national team's first continental tournament, where they made a sensational quarter-final.

== Career statistics ==
=== Club ===
As of match played 3 October 2021.

Appearances and goals by club, season and competition
Club	Season	League			Cup		League Cup		Other		Total	
Club	Season	Division	Apps	Goals	Apps	Goals	Apps	Goals	Apps	Goals	Apps	Goals
Chievo	2015–16	Serie A	0	0	0	0	—		—		0	0
Chievo	2016–17	Serie A	0	0	0	0	—		—		0	0
Chievo	2017–18	Serie A	0	0	0	0	—		—		0	0
Chievo	2018–19	Serie A	0	0	0	0	—		—		0	0
Chievo	Total		0	0	0	0	—		0	0	0	0
Cittadella (loan)	2015–16	Lega Pro	12	1	2	2	—		—		14	3
Taranto (loan)	2016–17	Lega Pro	14	0	0	0	—		—		14	0
Padova (loan)	2016–17	Lega Pro	4	0	—		—		1 (Note: Appearance(s) in the Lega Pro play-offs)	0	5	0
Reggiana (loan)	2017–18	Serie C	21	1	1	0	—		5 (Note: Appearance(s) in the Serie C play-offs)	0	27	1
Cuneo (loan)	2018–19	Serie C	32	3	0	0	2	0	—		34	3
Lecco	2019–20	Serie C	17	1	0	0	1	0	—		18	1
Livorno	2020–21	Serie C	7	0	0	0	—		—		7	0
Piacenza	2021–22	Serie C	7	0	0	0	2	1	—		9	1
Career total			114	6	3	2	5	1	6	0	128	9

=== International ===
As of match played 11 June 2021.

Appearances and goals by national team and year
National team	Year	Apps	Goals
Gambia	2017	1	0
Gambia	2018	3	0
Gambia	2021	4	0
Total		8	0
