= Nicola Dal Bosco =

Italian footballer

Personal information
- Date of birth: 1 May 1987 (age 39)
- Place of birth: Schio, Italy
- Height: 1.80 m (5 ft 11 in)
- Position: Forward

Youth career
- Thiene
- 2003–2007: Vicenza

Senior career*
Years	Team	Apps	(Gls)
2007–2014	Vicenza	5	(0)
2008	→ Mezzocorona (loan)	8	(2)
2008–2009	→ Lumezzane (loan)	25	(3)
2009–2010	→ Rodengo Saiano (loan)	18	(2)
2010	→ Alghero (loan)	11	(1)
2010–2011	→ Villacidrese (loan)	25	(6)
2011–2013	→ Poggibonsi (loan)	55	(12)
2018–present	→ Lumezzane	46	(30)
- * Club domestic league appearances and goals

Nicola Dal Bosco (born 1 May 1987) is an Italian footballer, striker of F.C. Lumezzane VGZ A.S.D.

== Biography ==
Born in Schio, the Province of Vicenza, Veneto, Dal Bosco started his career at Thiene, another town of the province. On 30 August 2003, Dal Bosco along with Enrico Marchese, Stefano Pozza and Mattia Prina were signed by Vicenza Calcio, the leading team of the province. Dal Bosco played for its reserve since 2004–05 season.

In 2007–08 Serie B Dal Bosco was promoted to the first team and played 5 times. He made his second division debut on 30 October 2007, against Messina. The team winning 2–0 just after half time and Dal Bosco replaced Ferdinando Sforzini in the 78th minute. He played 5 successive matches. Since January 2008 he spent entire career in Italian fourth division (as of June 2013), except 2008–09 in third division. In January 2008 he left for Mezzocorona in temporary deal. He played 8 times (all starts) in 2007–08 Serie C2, with 2 goals. Dal Bosco made 8 starts in 25 appearances for Lumezzane, with 3 goals in Lega Pro Prima Divisione (ex- Serie C1).

Dal Bosco returned to the fourth division in 2009, which renamed to Lega Pro Seconda Divisione. In January 2010 he left Rodengo–Saiano for Alghero. Alghero folded at the end of season despite finished sixth, Rodengo–Saiano also withdrew from professional league in 2011.

In August 2010 Villacidrese signed Dal Bosco. He scored 6 goals in 20 starts (25 appearances). However the club finished as the bottom and folded (with a new team from same town joined Terza Categoria)

In August 2011 Dal Bosco joined Poggibonsi. Despite only made 13 starts in 28 appearances, he scored 7 goals. Despite Vicenza relegated to the third division in 2012, the temporary deal of Dal Bosco was renewed on 12 July 2012. Vicenza later re-admitted to Serie B followed by the expel of U.S. Lecce.

On 1 July 2013 Dal Bosco returned to Vicenza. However, he only played for the club in friendly matches.
