= Filippo Damian =

Italian football player

Personal information
- Date of birth: 21 April 1996 (age 30)
- Place of birth: Castelfranco Veneto, Italy
- Height: 1.80 m (5 ft 11 in)
- Position: Midfielder

Team information
- Current team: Siracusa
- Number: 8

Youth career
- –2014: Padova
- 2014–2016: Chievo

Senior career*
Years	Team	Apps	(Gls)
2015–2018	Chievo	0	(0)
2016–2017	→ Como (loan)	24	(2)
2017–2018	→ Robur Siena (loan)	31	(0)
2018–2020	Robur Siena	0	(0)
2018–2019	→ Pordenone (loan)	23	(0)
2019–2020	→ Ternana (loan)	15	(1)
2020–2023	Ternana	34	(3)
2021–2022	→ ACR Messina (loan)	30	(1)
2022–2023	→ Trento (loan)	33	(3)
2023–2025	Casertana	54	(4)
2025–	Siracusa	1	(0)
- * Club domestic league appearances and goals as of 10 November 2025

Filippo Damian (born 21 April 1996) is an Italian footballer who plays as a midfielder for Serie D club Siracusa.

== Career ==
=== Chievo Verona ===
Born in Castelfranco Veneto, Damian was a youth exponent of ChievoVerona.

==== Loan to Como ====
On 31 August 2016, Damian was signed by Serie C side Como with a season-long loan deal. On 14 September he made his Serie C debut for Como as a substitute replacing Alessio Cristiani in the 76th minute of a 1–0 home defeat against Livorno. On 12 October he scored his first professional goal, as a substitute, in the 92nd minute of a 3–1 home win over Pontedera. On 30 October, Damian scored his second goal, again as a substitute, in the 90th minute of a 2–2 home draw against Olbia. On 7 November, Damian played his first full match, a 3–1 away defeat against Piacenza. Damian ended his loan to Como with 24 appearances, 2 goals and 1 assist.

==== Loan to Robur Siena ====
On 17 July 2017, Damian was loaned to Serie C club Robur Siena with a season-long loan deal. On 27 August, Damian made his debut for Robur Siena in Serie C, as a starter in a 1–0 home win against Lucchese, he was replaced by Simone Guerri in the 85th minute. On 3 September, Damian played his first entire match for Robur Siena, a 0–0 away draw against Pisa. On 29 March 2018 he was sent off with a red card in the 93rd minute of a 1–0 away defeat against Pontedera. Damian ended his season-long loan to Robur Siena with 31 appearances.

=== Robur Siena ===
On 27 July 2018, Damian joined to Serie C club Robur Siena with an undisclosed fee and a 3-year contract.

==== Loan to Pordenone ====
On 31 August 2018, Damian was loaned to Serie C club Pordenone on a season-long loan deal. On 18 September he made his debut for the club as a substitute replacing Simone Magnaghi in the 62nd minute of a 2–1 home win over Fano. On 17 October, Damian played his first match as a starter for Pordenone, a 2–1 away win over Vis Pesaro, he was replaced after 53 minutes by Emanuele Berrettoni. On 24 March 2019, he played his first entire match, a 1–1 away draw against Ternana. Damian ended his season-long loan to Pordenone with 23 appearances, but only 6 as a starter.

==== Loan to Ternana ====
On 2 September 2019, Damian joined Ternana in Serie C with another season-long loan with an option to buy. Four weeks later, on 28 September he made his debut for the club as a 75th-minute substitute replacing Marino Defendi in a 2–1 away win over Virtus Francavilla. On 1 December he played his first match as a starter for the club, a 3–1 away win over Catanzaro, he was replaced by Marino Defendi after 69 minutes. On 22 January 2020, Damian scored his first goal for Ternana, as a substitute, in the 92nd minute of a 3–0 home win over Rieti. Damian ended his loan with 15 appearances and 1 goal.

=== Ternana ===
On 31 January 2020, he moved to Ternana on a permanent basis and signed a 3.5-year contract with the club.

==== Loan to ACR Messina ====
On 14 August 2021, he extended his contract with Ternana until June 2024 and was loaned to ACR Messina for the 2021–22 season.

==== Loan to Trento ====
On 1 August 2022, Damian moved on loan to Trento, with an option to buy.

==== Release by Ternana ====
On 24 August 2023, his contract with Ternana was terminated by mutual consent.

=== Casertana ===
On 6 September 2023, Damian joined Casertana.

== Career statistics ==
=== Club ===
As of match played 10 April 2022

Club	Season	League			Cup		Europe		Other		Total	
Club	Season	League	Apps	Goals	Apps	Goals	Apps	Goals	Apps	Goals	Apps	Goals
Como (loan)	2016–17	Serie C	23	2	0	0	—		1 (Note: All appearance(s) in Serie C play-off.)	0	24	2
Robur Siena (loan)	2017–18	Serie C	28	0	0	0	—		4	0	32	0
Pordenone (loan)	2018–19	Serie C	21	0	0	0	—		2 (Note: All appearance(s) in Supercoppa di Serie C.)	0	23	0
Ternana (loan)	2019–20	Serie C	19	2	0	0	—		2	0	21	2
Ternana	2020–21	Serie C	28	2	1	0	—		—		29	2
Ternana	Total		47	4	1	0	—		2	0	50	4
ACR Messina (loan)	2021–22	Serie C	30	1	0	0	—		—		30	1
Career total			149	7	1	0	—		9	0	159	7

== Honours ==
=== Club ===
Pordenone

- Serie C (Group B): 2018–19
- Supercoppa di Serie C: 2019
