= Fabio Depaoli =

Italian footballer (born 1997)

Personal information
- Date of birth: 24 April 1997 (age 29)
- Place of birth: Riva del Garda, Italy
- Height: 1.82 m (6 ft 0 in)
- Positions: Right back; central midfielder

Team information
- Current team: Sampdoria
- Number: 23

Youth career
- 2003–2008: GS Trilacum
- 2008–2016: Chievo

Senior career*
Years	Team	Apps	(Gls)
2016–2019	Chievo	58	(0)
2019–	Sampdoria	130	(11)
2020–2021	→ Atalanta (loan)	5	(0)
2021	→ Benevento (loan)	15	(0)
2022	→ Hellas Verona (loan)	18	(1)
2022–2023	→ Hellas Verona (loan)	31	(2)

International career
2017–2019	Italy U21	5	(1)
- * Club domestic league appearances and goals as of 13 May 2026

Fabio Depaoli (born 24 April 1997) is an Italian professional footballer who plays as a right-back or central midfielder for Serie B club Sampdoria.

== Club career ==
=== ChievoVerona ===
Depaoli made his professional debut in the Serie A for Chievo on 12 March 2017 in a game against Empoli as an 89th-minute substitute for Përparim Hetemaj in a 4–0 victory.

=== Sampdoria ===
On 22 June 2019, Depaoli signed a contract with Sampdoria until 30 June 2024.

==== Loan to Atalanta ====
On 2 October 2020, Depaoli joined Atalanta on loan with an option to buy.

==== Loan to Benevento ====
On 26 January 2020, Depaoli's loan to Atalanta was terminated early; he joined Benevento on loan with an option to buy for the remainder of the 2020–21 season.

==== Loans to Verona ====
On 3 January 2022, he joined Hellas Verona on loan until the end of the 2021–22 season, with an option to purchase. After beginning the 2022–23 season in Sampdoria rotation and starting one game against Salernitana, on 1 September 2022 Depaoli returned to Hellas Verona on a new loan, with an option to purchase.

== International career ==
Depaoli made his debut with the U21 team on 5 October 2017, scoring one goal in a 6–2 friendly win against Hungary in Budapest.

== Career statistics ==
As of match played 6 April 2025

Appearances and goals by club, season and competition
Club	Season	League			National cup		Continental		Other		Total	
Club	Season	Division	Apps	Goals	Apps	Goals	Apps	Goals	Apps	Goals	Apps	Goals
Chievo	2016–17	Serie A	6	0	1	0	—		—		7	0
Chievo	2017–18	Serie A	19	0	1	0	—		—		20	0
Chievo	2018–19	Serie A	33	0	1	0	—		—		34	0
Chievo	Total		58	0	3	0	—		—		61	0
Sampdoria	2019–20	Serie A	29	0	0	0	—		—		29	0
Sampdoria	2020–21	Serie A	2	0	—		—		—		2	0
Sampdoria	2021–22	Serie A	6	0	2	0	—		—		8	0
Sampdoria	2022–23	Serie A	3	0	—		—		—		3	0
Sampdoria	2023–24	Serie B	32	4	2	0	—		1 (Note: Appearances in Serie B promotion play-offs)	0	35	4
Sampdoria	2024–25	Serie B	27	3	2	0	—		—		29	3
Sampdoria	Total		99	7	6	0	—		1	0	106	7
Atalanta (loan)	2020–21	Serie A	5	0	1	0	1 (Note: Appearance(s) in UEFA Champions League)	0	—		7	0
Benevento (loan)	2020–21	Serie A	15	0	—		—		–		15	0
Hellas Verona (loan)	2021–22	Serie A	18	1	0	0	—		–		18	1
Hellas Verona (loan)	2022–23	Serie A	31	2	0	0	—		1 (Note: Appearance in Serie A relegation tie-breaker)	0	32	2
Hellas Verona (loan)	Total		49	3	0	0	—		1	0	50	3
Career total			226	10	10	0	1	0	2	0	239	10
