= Ivan Lanni =

Italian footballer

Personal information
- Date of birth: 30 June 1990 (age 36)
- Place of birth: Alatri, Italy
- Height: 1.88 m (6 ft 2 in)
- Position: Goalkeeper

Team information
- Current team: Siena
- Number: 1

Youth career
- –2009: Roma
- 2008–2009: → Lecce (loan)

Senior career*
Years	Team	Apps	(Gls)
2009	Grosseto	0	(0)
2009–2011	Pisa	22	(0)
2011–2014	Grosseto	61	(0)
2014–2020	Ascoli	155	(0)
2020–2021	Novara	37	(0)
2021–	Siena	34	(0)
- * Club domestic league appearances and goals as of 27 March 2022

Ivan Lanni (born 30 June 1990) is an Italian footballer who plays as a goalkeeper for Serie D Group E club Siena.

== Career ==
On 30 January 2020, he signed a 1.5-year contract with Novara.

== Career statistics ==
=== Club ===
As of match played 27 March 2022

Appearances and goals by club, season and competition
Club	Season	League			National Cup		Other		Total	
Club	Season	Division	Apps	Goals	Apps	Goals	Apps	Goals	Apps	Goals
Pisa	2010–11	Lega Pro	22	0	—		—		22	0
Grosseto	2012–13	Serie B	32	0	0	0	—		32	0
Grosseto	2013–14	Lega Pro	29	0	4	0	—		33	0
Grosseto	Total		61	0	4	0	0	0	65	0
Ascoli	2014–15	Lega Pro	36	0	2	0	1 (Note: Appearance(s) in Promotion Playoffs)	0	39	0
Ascoli	2015–16	Serie B	33	0	1	0	—		34	0
Ascoli	2016–17	Serie B	41	0	1	0	—		42	0
Ascoli	2017–18	Serie B	28	0	2	0	—		30	0
Ascoli	2018–19	Serie B	14	0	1	0	—		15	0
Ascoli	2019–20	Serie B	3	0	3	0	—		6	0
Ascoli	Total		155	0	10	0	1	0	166	0
Novara	2019–20	Serie C	3	0	—		4	0	7	0
Novara	2020–21	Serie C	34	0	2	0	—		36	0
Novara	Total		37	0	2	0	4	0	43	0
Siena	2021–22	Serie C	38	0	1	0	—		39	0
Siena	2022–23	Serie C	24	0	0	0	—		24	0
Siena	Total		62	0	1	0	4	0	63	0
Career total			337	0	17	0	5	0	359	0

== Honours ==
=== Club ===
Ascoli

- Lega Pro: 2014–15
