= Alessio Cristiani =

Italian football player (born 1989)

Personal information
- Date of birth: 24 December 1989 (age 36)
- Place of birth: Livorno, Italy
- Height: 1.64 m (5 ft 4 1/2 in)
- Position: Midfielder

Team information
- Current team: Nocerina
- Number: 17

Youth career
- –2006: Sassuolo

Senior career*
Years	Team	Apps	(Gls)
2006–2008	Armando Picchi	55	(10)
2008–2012	Viareggio	111	(10)
2012–2013	Benevento	9	(0)
2013–2017	Como	93	(13)
2017–2019	Robur Siena	49	(4)
2019–2021	Messina	52	(4)
2021–2022	Acireale	23	(0)
2022–2023	Lamezia	25	(1)
2023–2024	Siena		
2024–	Nocerina	7	(2)
- * Club domestic league appearances and goals as of 17 November 2024

Alessio Cristiani (born 24 December 1989) is an Italian football player who plays for Serie D club Nocerina.

== Club career ==
He made his Serie C debut for Viareggio on 23 August 2009 in a game against Cremonese.

On 3 September 2019, he joined Serie D club Messina.

On 27 September 2021, he moved to Acireale in Serie D.
