= Daniele Simoncelli =

Italian footballer (born 1989)

Personal information
- Date of birth: 28 December 1989 (age 36)
- Place of birth: Cattolica, Italy
- Height: 1.75 m (5 ft 9 in)
- Position: Forward

Team information
- Current team: Correggese

Youth career
- Brescia

Senior career*
Years	Team	Apps	(Gls)
2007–2009	Brescia	0	(0)
2007	→ Rodengo (loan)	6	(0)
2008–2009	→ Olbia (loan)	23	(2)
2009–2013	Barletta	95	(12)
2014	Savona	8	(0)
2014–2015	Pordenone	24	(2)
2015–2016	Sammaurese	25	(7)
2016–2017	Altovicentino	20	(1)
2017–2019	Rimini	44	(4)
2019	Monterosi FC	11	(1)
2019–2020	Pineto Calcio	7	(0)
2020–2021	Rimini	26	(0)
2021–	Correggese	34	(5)
- * Club domestic league appearances and goals as of 1 March 2020

Daniele Simoncelli (born 28 December 1989) is an Italian footballer who plays for Correggese.

== Career ==
=== Brescia ===
Born in Cattolica, Romagna region, Simoncelli started his career at Lombard club Brescia. In January 2007 he spent 6 months with Serie D club Rodengo–Saiano. in 2007–08 he returned to Brescia for its reserve. In 2008–09 season he was loaned to Olbia of the fourth division.

=== Barletta ===
In summer 2009, Simoncelli was signed by another fourth-division club, Barletta in co-ownership deal. The team won promotion to the third division as a play-off winner. In June 2010 Brescia gave up the remaining 50% of registration rights to Barletta. He scored 4 league goals in his maiden Lega Pro Prima Divisione season. On 2 September 2011, his contract was extended to last until 30 June 2014. Simoncelli made 40 more league appearances for Barletta from 2011 to 2013, and about half of them were substitutes, scoring only twice. On 6 August 2013, his contract was terminated with mutual consent.

=== Savona ===
On 23 January 2014 he was signed by Savona F.B.C.

=== Pordenone ===
On 21 July 2014 Simoncelli was signed by Pordenone in a 1-year contract.

=== Rimini ===
On 3 June 2018, he signed a new contract to keep him at Rimini until 2019.

=== Monterosi ===
On 24 August 2019, he joined Serie D club Monterosi.

In September 2021, he moved to Correggese. He played 34 Serie D matches, and was the captain of the team.
