= Antonio Cinelli =

Italian professional football player (born 1989)

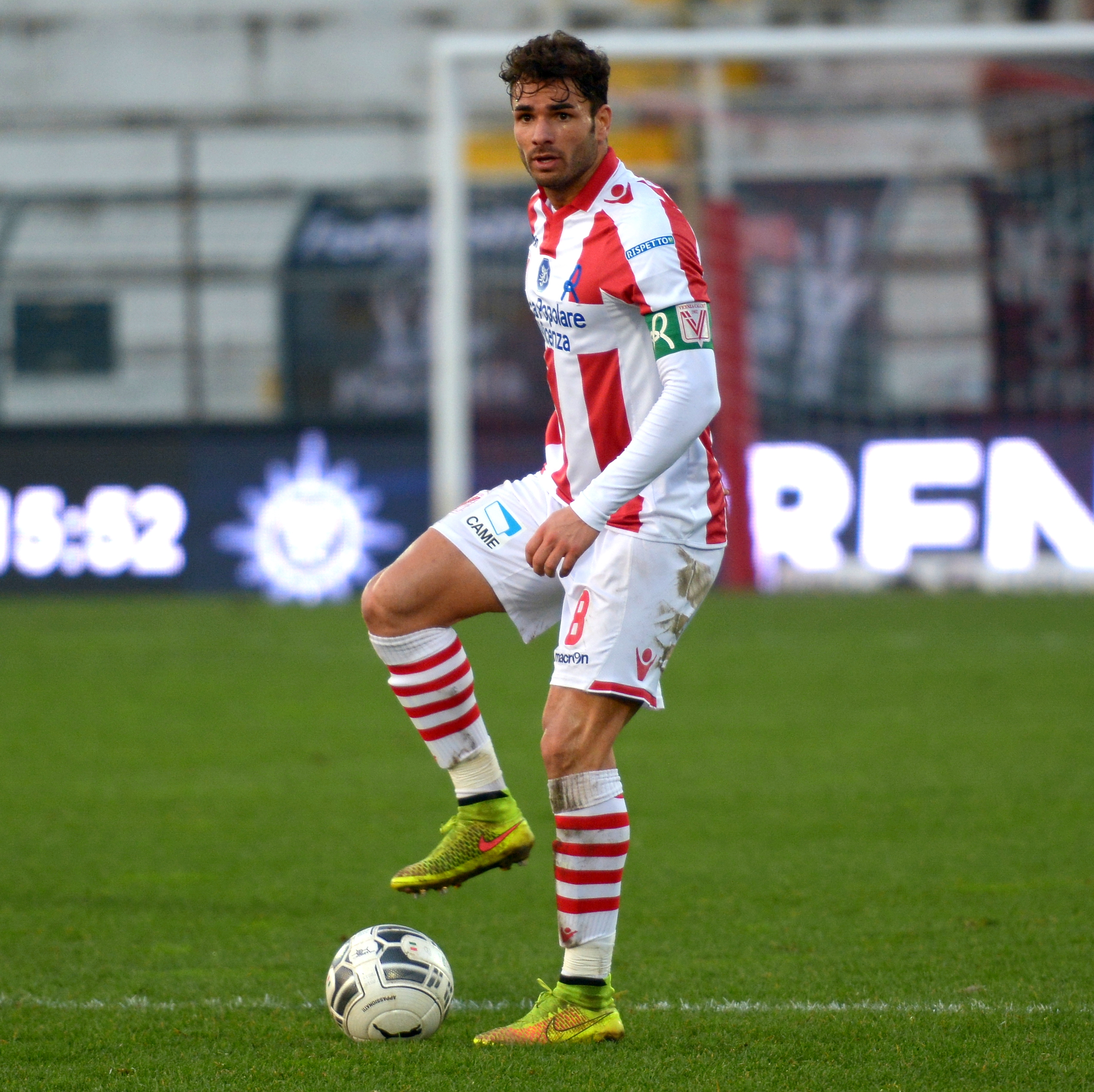
- Cinelli in 2014

Personal information
- Date of birth: 8 December 1989 (age 36)
- Place of birth: Rome, Italy
- Height: 1.78 m (5 ft 10 in)
- Position: Midfielder

Youth career
- Lazio

Senior career*
Years	Team	Apps	(Gls)
2008–2010	Lazio	0	(0)
2009–2010	→ Lumezzane (loan)	26	(0)
2010–2012	Sassuolo	6	(0)
2012	→ Pavia (loan)	13	(1)
2012–2013	Lazio	0	(0)
2013–2016	Vicenza	104	(5)
2016	Cagliari	12	(1)
2016–2018	Chievo	0	(0)
2016–2017	→ Cesena (loan)	21	(1)
2017	→ Novara (loan)	16	(0)
2017–2018	→ Cremonese (loan)	16	(0)
2019–2021	Vicenza Virtus	71	(5)
2021–2023	Catanzaro	50	(0)
2023	Sangiuliano	9	(1)
Total		344	(14)
- * Club domestic league appearances and goals

Antonio Cinelli (born 8 December 1989) is an Italian former footballer who plays as a midfielder.

== Career ==
=== Lazio ===
Born in Rome, capital of the Lazio region (and Italy), Cinelli started his career at S.S. Lazio. He was sold to Sassuolo in a co-ownership deal in 2010 for €200,000, on a three-year contract. In June 2012 Lazio bought back the 50% registration rights of Cinelli for €30,000 fee, on a one-year contract.

=== Vicenza ===
Cinelli was signed by Serie B club Vicenza on 7 January 2013 on a free transfer.

On 8 June 2015, Cinelli signed a new one-year contract with Vicenza. However, on 19 January 2016 Cinelli was transferred to Cagliari, for €100,000 transfer fee.

=== Chievo ===
On 19 July 2016, he was signed by Serie A club Chievo, on a three-year contract. His spell with Chievo was short-lived, which on 8 August he was transferred to Cesena on loan, with an obligation to buy; according to Chievo, the loan fee was €180,000.

On 31 January 2017, Cinelli left for Novara on a temporary basis. Cesena and Chievo also canceled the obligation to buy.

On 24 August 2017, Cinelli left for Serie B newcomers Cremonese on another loan.

He was released from his Chievo contract by mutual consent on 6 November 2018.

=== Return to Vicenza ===
On 3 January 2019, he signed with Vicenza Virtus.

=== Catanzaro ===
On 10 August 2021, he joined Catanzaro on a two-year contract.

=== Serie D ===
On 10 August 2023, Cinelli moved to Sangiuliano in Serie D.
