= Emanuel Vignato =

Italian footballer (born 2000)

Personal information
- Date of birth: 24 August 2000 (age 26)
- Place of birth: Negrar, Italy
- Height: 1.75 m (5 ft 9 in)
- Position: Winger

Team information
- Current team: Forte Virtus (on loan from Pisa)
- Number: 10

Youth career
- Chievo

Senior career*
Years	Team	Apps	(Gls)
2017–2020	Chievo	28	(4)
2020–2023	Bologna	63	(1)
2020	→ Chievo (loan)	19	(2)
2023	→ Empoli (loan)	5	(1)
2023–	Pisa	23	(0)
2024	→ Salernitana (loan)	9	(0)
2025–2026	→ AEL (loan)	1	(0)
2026	→ Akritas Chlorakas (loan)	7	(0)
2026–	→ Forte Virtus (loan)	0	(0)

International career^{‡}
2016–2017	Italy U17	8	(0)
2017–2018	Italy U18	8	(3)
2018–2019	Italy U19	2	(0)
2019–2020	Italy U20	4	(0)
2021–2022	Italy U21	10	(2)
- * Club domestic league appearances and goals as of 18 September 2026 ‡ National team caps and goals as of 19 November 2022

Emanuel Vignato (born 24 August 2000) is an Italian professional footballer who plays as midfielder for UAE First Division League club Forte Virtus on loan from Pisa.

== Club career ==
=== Bologna ===
==== Loan to Chievo ====
On 20 January 2020, he signed a contract with Bologna and was loaned back to Chievo for the remainder of the 2019–20 season.

==== Loan to Empoli ====
On 31 January 2023, Vignato joined Empoli on a year-and-a-half-long loan with an option to buy.

=== Pisa ===
On 1 September 2023, Vignato signed with Pisa.

On 1 February 2024, Vignato was loaned by Salernitana, with an option to buy.

On 8 September 2025, Vignato moved on loan to AEL in Greece.

On 17 September 2026, Pisa announced a new loan for Vignato to Forte Virtus in the United Arab Emirates.

== International career ==
Vignato was born in Italy to an Italian father and a Brazilian mother. He was called up to represent both Brazil U17, without playing a match. He opted to represent Italy, playing for their under-17 team.

On 8 October 2021 he made his debut with the Italy U21 squad, playing as a starter and scoring a goal in the qualifying match won 2–1 against Bosnia and Herzegovina in Zenica.

== Personal life ==
Vignato's brother, Samuele, is also a professional footballer.

== Career statistics ==
=== Club ===
As of match played 25 May 2024

Club	Season	League	League		National Cup (Note: Includes Coppa Italia)		Total	
Club	Season	League	Apps	Goals	Apps	Goals	Apps	Goals
Chievo	2016–17	Serie A	2	0	—		2	0
Chievo	2018–19	Serie A	10	1	0	0	10	1
Chievo	2019–20	Serie B	35	5	2	0	37	5
Chievo	Total		47	6	2	0	49	6
Bologna	2020–21	Serie A	31	1	2	1	33	2
Bologna	2021–22	Serie A	24	0	1	0	25	0
Bologna	2022–23	Serie A	8	0	1	0	9	0
Bologna	Total		63	1	4	1	67	2
Empoli	2022–23	Serie A	5	1	0	0	5	1
Pisa	2023–24	Serie B	12	0	0	0	12	0
Salernitana	2023–24	Serie A	9	0	0	0	9	0
Career total			132	8	6	1	138	9
