= Paweł Jaroszyński =

Polish footballer

Personal information
- Full name: Paweł Kamil Jaroszyński
- Date of birth: 2 October 1994 (age 32)
- Place of birth: Lublin, Poland
- Height: 1.84 m (6 ft 0 in)
- Position: Left-back

Team information
- Current team: Górnik Łęczna
- Number: 4

Youth career
- –2011: Górnik Łęczna
- 2011–2013: Cracovia

Senior career*
Years	Team	Apps	(Gls)
2013–2017	Cracovia	62	(1)
2017–2019	Chievo	30	(0)
2019–2022	Genoa	0	(0)
2019–2020	→ Salernitana (loan)	32	(0)
2020–2021	→ Pescara (loan)	16	(0)
2021–2022	→ Salernitana (loan)	29	(0)
2022–2023	Salernitana	0	(0)
2022–2023	→ Cracovia (loan)	21	(0)
2023–2024	Cracovia	21	(3)
2024–2025	Salernitana	12	(0)
2025–	Górnik Łęczna	13	(2)

International career
2013–2014	Poland U20	4	(0)
2015–2017	Poland U21	12	(1)
- * Club domestic league appearances and goals as of 16:06, 26 May 2026 (UTC)

Paweł Kamil Jaroszyński (born 2 October 1994) is a Polish professional footballer who plays as a left-back for and captains II liga club Górnik Łęczna.

== Club career ==
Jaroszyński started his career with Cracovia.

On 18 July 2017, he signed a four-year deal with Chievo Verona.

On 22 June 2019, Genoa announced the signing of Jaroszyński. Shortly after, on 7 August 2019, he moved to Serie B club Salernitana on loan until 30 June 2020. On 21 September 2020, he returned to Serie B, joining Pescara on another season-long loan. On 1 February 2021, he returned to Salernitana on another loan spell. On 17 July 2021, the loan was renewed with a conditional obligation to buy.

On 31 August 2022, after joining Salernitana on a permanent basis, he returned to Cracovia on loan until the end of the season.

On 30 August 2024, Jaroszyński moved to Salernitana for the third time in his career.

On 14 October 2025, Jaroszyński rejoined his childhood club Górnik Łęczna on a deal until June 2026.

== Career statistics ==
As of match played 24 April 2026

Appearances and goals by club, season and competition
Club	Season	League			National cup (Note: Includes Polish Cup, Coppa Italia)		Europe		Total	
Club	Season	Division	Apps	Goals	Apps	Goals	Apps	Goals	Apps	Goals
Cracovia	2013–14	Ekstraklasa	13	0	0	0	—		13	0
Cracovia	2014–15	Ekstraklasa	15	0	3	0	—		18	0
Cracovia	2015–16	Ekstraklasa	22	1	2	0	—		24	1
Cracovia	2016–17	Ekstraklasa	12	0	0	0	0	0	12	0
Cracovia	Total		62	1	5	0	0	0	67	1
Chievo	2017–18	Serie A	11	0	1	0	—		12	0
Chievo	2018–19	Serie A	19	0	1	0	—		20	0
Chievo	Total		30	0	2	0	0	0	32	0
Salernitana (loan)	2019–20	Serie B	32	0	2	0	—		34	0
Pescara (loan)	2020–21	Serie B	16	0	1	0	—		17	0
Salernitana (loan)	2020–21	Serie B	16	0	0	0	—		16	0
Salernitana (loan)	2021–22	Serie A	13	0	1	0	—		14	0
Salernitana (loan)	Total		29	0	1	0	0	0	30	0
Cracovia (loan)	2022–23	Ekstraklasa	21	0	1	0	—		22	0
Cracovia	2023–24	Ekstraklasa	20	3	1	1	—		21	4
Cracovia	2024–25	Ekstraklasa	1	0	0	0	—		1	0
Cracovia	Total		42	3	2	1	—		44	4
Salernitana	2024–25	Serie B	12	0	1	0	—		13	0
Górnik Łęczna	2025–26	I liga	13	2	—		—		13	2
Career total			236	6	14	1	0	0	250	7

== Honours ==
Cracovia II

- IV liga Lesser Poland West: 2014–15
