= Alessandro Confente =

Italian football player (born 1998)

Personal information
- Date of birth: 7 June 1998 (age 28)
- Place of birth: Soave, Italy
- Height: 1.94 m (6 ft 4 in)
- Position: Goalkeeper

Team information
- Current team: Pisa
- Number: 98

Youth career
- –2012: Sambonifacese
- 2012–2017: Chievo

Senior career*
Years	Team	Apps	(Gls)
2016–2021	Chievo	0	(0)
2018–2019	→ Reggina (loan)	31	(0)
2019–2020	→ Robur Siena (loan)	27	(0)
2020–2021	→ Catania (loan)	19	(0)
2021–2025	Vicenza	103	(0)
2025–2026	Juve Stabia	33	(0)
2026–	Pisa	1	(0)

International career^{‡}
2016–2017	Italy U-19	2	(0)
- * Club domestic league appearances and goals as of 23 August 2026 ‡ National team caps and goals as of 18 January 2017

Alessandro Confente (born 7 June 1998) is an Italian professional footballer who plays as a goalkeeper for Serie B club Pisa.

== Club career ==
=== ChievoVerona ===
Confente joined Chievo in 2012 and played for their junior squads, including the Under-19 team. From late on in the 2015–16 season, he also became the second- or third-choice goalkeeper for the senior squad and appeared on the bench in most Serie A games, but did not appear on the field throughout 2015–16, 2016–17 and 2017–18 season, behind the first-choice goalkeepers Albano Bizzarri and then Stefano Sorrentino.

==== Loan to Reggina ====
On 9 July 2018, Confente joined Serie C club Reggina on a season-long loan. He made his Serie C debut for Reggina on 18 September 2018 in their season opener against Trapani. Four days later, on 22 September, Confente kept his first clean sheet for Reggina in a 1–0 home win over Bisceglie. He continued to hold the starting goalkeeper spot for Reggina early in the season. On 15 October he kept his second clean sheet in another 1–0 home win against Siracusa and, two months later, on 16 December, his third in a 1–0 away win over Casertana. Confente helped the club to reach the play-offs, however Reggina loss 4–1 against Catania in the second round. He ended his season-long loan to Reggina with 33 appearances, 11 clean sheets and 35 goals conceded.

==== Loan to Robur Siena ====
On 16 July 2019, Confente was loaned to Serie C side Robur Siena on a season-long loan deal. On 4 August he made his debut for the club in a 2–0 home defeat against Mantova in the first round of Coppa Italia. Three weeks later, on 25 August, he made his Serie C debut for Robur Siena, a 2–1 home defeat against Olbia. He became Robur Siena's first-choice early in the season. On 15 September, Confente kept his first clean sheet for the club in a 2–0 away win over Lecco. One month later, on 25 September, he kept his second clean sheet in a 2–0 away win over Monza and two more weeks later his third in a 1–0 away won over AlbinoLeffe. Confente ended his loan to Robur Siena with 29 appearances, 33 goals conceded and 8 clean sheets.

==== Loan to Catania ====
He appeared as a back up to Andrea Seculin in the first games of the 2020–21 season for Chievo. On 5 October 2020, he joined Catania on loan for the season. On 29 November he made his league debut for the club in a 2–1 away win over Avellino. Three days later, on 2 December, he kept his first clean sheet for the club in a 3–0 home win over Bisceglie. On 20 December he kept his second clean sheet for Catania in a 1–0 away win over Potenza, and two months later, on 13 February his third in another 1-0 win over Virtus Francavilla. In March 2021 Confente suffered a meniscus injury of his left knee and he stayed out for the rest of the season. Confente ended his season-long loan with 19 appearances, 20 goals conceded and 5 clean sheet.

=== Vicenza ===
On 16 August 2021, he joined Vicenza with a 2-years contract.

=== Juve Stabia ===
On 9 July 2025, Confente moved to Juve Stabia in Serie B on a two-season deal.

== International career ==
He was called up to the Italy national under-19 football team on two occasions in 2016 and 2017, both time for friendlies.

== Career statistics ==
=== Club ===
As of 24 May 2021

Club	Season	League			Cup		Europe		Other		Total	
Club	Season	League	Apps	Goals	Apps	Goals	Apps	Goals	Apps	Goals	Apps	Goals
Reggina (loan)	2018–19	Serie C	31	0	0	0	—		2 (Note: All appearance(s) in Serie C play-off.)	0	33	0
Robur Siena (loan)	2019–20	Serie C	27	0	1	0	—		1	0	29	0
Catania (loan)	2020–21	Serie C	19	0	0	0	—		—		19	0
Career total			77	0	1	0	—		3	0	81	0
