= Stefano Pozza =

Italian footballer

Personal information
- Date of birth: 6 August 1987 (age 39)
- Place of birth: Schio, Italy
- Height: 1.81 m (5 ft 11 1/2 in)
- Positions: Midfielder; defender

Team information
- Current team: Real Vicenza Vs

Senior career*
| Years | Team | Apps | (Gls) |
| 2005–2008 | A.C. Chioggia Sottomarina | 74 | (4) |
| 2008–2009 | A.C. Giacomense | 20 | (1) |
| 2009–2010 | S.S. Cavese 1919 | | |
- * Club domestic league appearances and goals as of December 1, 2009

Stefano Pozza (born 6 August 1987 in Schio) is an Italian football midfielder or defender who currently plays for Real Vicenza.

== Caps on Italian Series ==
- Serie C2 : 20 Caps, 1 Goal
- Serie D : 74 Caps, 4 Goals
