= Fabrizio Cacciatore =

Italian professional footballer

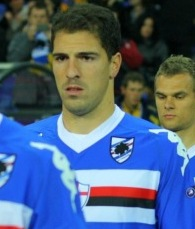
- Cacciatore with Sampdoria

Personal information
- Date of birth: 8 October 1986 (age 40)
- Place of birth: Turin, Italy
- Height: 1.82 m (6 ft 0 in)
- Position: Full-back

Youth career
- Pro Vercelli
- 2003–2004: → Sampdoria (loan)
- 2004–2005: Sampdoria

Senior career*
Years	Team	Apps	(Gls)
2005–2012	Sampdoria	15	(0)
2005–2006	→ Olbia (loan)	32	(0)
2006–2007	→ Reggiana (loan)	22	(1)
2007–2008	→ Foligno (loan)	30	(1)
2008–2009	→ Triestina (loan)	36	(0)
2011	→ Siena (loan)	6	(0)
2011–2012	→ Varese (loan)	37	(3)
2012–2014	Verona	70	(5)
2014–2015	Sampdoria	11	(0)
2015–2016	→ Chievo (loan)	29	(1)
2016–2019	Chievo	69	(3)
2019	→ Cagliari (loan)	7	(0)
2019–2020	Cagliari	16	(0)
2021	Ascoli	1	(0)
2021–2022	Caldiero Terme		

International career
2004	Italy U18	2	(0)

Managerial career
- 2022–2023: Caldiero Terme
- 2023–2024: Montecchio
- 2024–2025: Treviso
- 2025: ChievoVerona
- * Club domestic league appearances and goals as of 10 May 2021

Fabrizio Cacciatore (born 8 October 1986) is an Italian football coach and retired player, who played in the role of full-back.

== Club career ==
=== Sampdoria ===
Born in Turin, Piedmont, Cacciatore started his career at Pro Vercelli, in Vercelli, Piedmont. In 2003, he joined Sampdoria as a youth player. After spending four seasons on loan at lower division clubs, he would finally feature in his first match for Sampdoria on 16 August 2009, in a 6–2 loss to Lecce in the Coppa Italia. For that season he wore the number 22 shirt.

On 31 January 2011, Cacciatore was signed by Siena. On 8 July 2011, Cacciatore joined Varese.

=== Verona ===
On 31 August 2012, he signed for Verona on a temporary deal. On 19 June 2013, Verona signed him in a co-ownership deal for €500,000.

=== Return to Sampdoria ===
On 20 June 2014, Sampdoria bought back Cacciatore for €370,000; he signed a three-year contract. He was injured in January 2015 in the match against Internazionale in the 2014–15 Coppa Italia competition. Although he returned to training in March, he still missed the rest of the season. Cacciatore was not included in the party for the July 2015 pre-season training camp.

=== Chievo ===
On 16 July 2015, Cacciatore joined Chievo on a year's loan, with an obligation to buy, as part of the deal to send Ervin Zukanović to Sampdoria. He was given squad number 29.

=== Cagliari ===
On 31 January 2019, Cacciatore joined Cagliari on loan with an obligation to buy.

=== Ascoli ===
On 28 March 2021, he signed with Ascoli in Serie B. After leaving Ascoli as a free agent, Cacciatore penned a contract with Caldiero Terme, with whom he would later be appointed as coach.

== International career ==
He was twice called up to the Italy U18 squad.

== Coaching career ==
On 1 August 2025, Cacciatore was named the new head coach of Serie D club ChievoVerona. He was dismissed from his role on 15 December 2025 following a negative string of results.
