= Boštjan Cesar =

Slovenian football player and manager (born 1982)

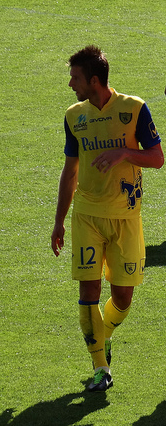
- Cesar with Chievo in 2013

Personal information
- Full name: Boštjan Cesar
- Date of birth: 9 July 1982 (age 44)
- Place of birth: Ljubljana, SFR Yugoslavia
- Height: 1.91 m (6 ft 3 in)
- Position: Centre-back

Team information
- Current team: Slovenia (manager)

Youth career
- Olimpija
- Dinamo Zagreb

Senior career*
Years	Team	Apps	(Gls)
2000–2005	Dinamo Zagreb	58	(3)
2001	→ Croatia Sesvete (loan)	7	(0)
2005	→ Olimpija (loan)	9	(0)
2005–2009	Marseille	24	(0)
2007–2008	→ West Bromwich Albion (loan)	20	(1)
2009–2010	Grenoble	40	(1)
2010–2020	Chievo	236	(7)
Total		394	(12)

International career
1997	Slovenia U15	2	(0)
1998	Slovenia U16	4	(0)
2000–2001	Slovenia U20	3	(0)
2001–2003	Slovenia U21	15	(1)
2003	Slovenia B	1	(0)
2003–2018	Slovenia	101	(10)

Managerial career
- 2021: Slovenia U18
- 2021: Slovenia U19
- 2022–2024: Slovenia (assistant)
- 2024–2025: Maribor
- 2026–: Slovenia
- * Club domestic league appearances and goals

Boštjan Cesar (born 9 July 1982) is a Slovenian professional football manager and former player who played as a centre-back. Since January 2026, he has been the manager of the Slovenia national team.

Besides Slovenia, Cesar played in Croatia, France, England and Italy. With 101 international appearances, he is Slovenia's most capped player of all time, and represented them at the 2010 FIFA World Cup.

== Club career ==
Cesar joined Marseille from Croatian club Dinamo Zagreb in 2005 for a reported transfer fee of 2.5€ million. He then joined West Bromwich Albion on a season-long loan in August 2007, with an option for a permanent move. Cesar made his debut for West Bromwich in a 1–0 League Cup victory over Bournemouth on 14 August 2007. His league debut came more than two months later when West Bromwich defeated Blackpool 2–1 on 23 October 2007. He scored his only West Bromwich goal on 2 February 2008 in a 2–1 win against Burnley. Overall, he made 24 appearances for West Bromwich in all competitions, but returned to Marseille at the end of the season after the manager Tony Mowbray decided against pursuing a permanent deal for the player.

Cesar left Marseille in January 2009 and joined fellow French club Grenoble. He scored his first goal for the club in his second appearance in a 1–1 draw against Bordeaux. In May 2010, Chievo announced the capture of his signature on a free transfer; he officially joined the club on 1 July. On 31 May 2011, he signed a new two-year contract.

== International career ==
Cesar made his international debut on 12 February 2003, playing the entirety of a 5–1 friendly defeat to Switzerland in Nova Gorica. On 9 October 2004, he scored his first international goal to defeat Italy in a World Cup qualifier; it was Italy's only defeat as they went on to win the World Cup.

On 15 November 2014, he made his 81st appearance for the national team, surpassing Zlatko Zahovič as their most capped player of all time.

On 8 October 2017, Cesar became the first Slovenian player to earn 100 national team caps, in a 2–2 home draw with Scotland in the 2018 FIFA World Cup qualification. He was sent off at the end of the match. Cesar retired from the national team on 27 March 2018 in a home match against Belarus.

== Career statistics ==
=== Club ===
Appearances and goals by club, season and competition
Club	Season	League			Cup		Continental		Total	
Club	Season	Division	Apps	Goals	Apps	Goals	Apps	Goals	Apps	Goals
Dinamo Zagreb	2000–01	1. HNL	2	0	0	0	0	0	2	0
Dinamo Zagreb	2001–02	1. HNL	18	0	0	0	4	0	22	0
Dinamo Zagreb	2002–03	1. HNL	11	0	0	0	2	0	13	0
Dinamo Zagreb	2003–04	1. HNL	11	0	0	0	5	0	16	0
Dinamo Zagreb	2004–05	1. HNL	11	1	0	0	0	0	11	1
Dinamo Zagreb	2005–06	1. HNL	5	2	0	0	0	0	5	2
Dinamo Zagreb	Total		58	3	0	0	11	0	69	3
Croatia Sesvete (loan)	2000–01	Druga HNL	7	0	0	0	—		7	0
Olimpija (loan)	2004–05	1. SNL	9	0	1	0	—		10	0
Marseille	2005–06	Ligue 1	17	0	1 (Note: Appearance(s) in Coupe de France)	0	6	1	24	1
Marseille	2006–07	Ligue 1	7	0	3 (Note: One appearance in Coupe de France and two appearances in Coupe de la Ligue)	0	5	0	15	0
Marseille	Total		24	0	4	0	11	1	39	1
West Bromwich (loan)	2007–08	Championship	20	1	4 (Note: Two appearances in FA Cup and two appearances in EFL Cup)	0	—		24	1
Grenoble	2008–09	Ligue 1	15	1	2	0	—		17	1
Grenoble	2009–10	Ligue 1	25	0	0	0	—		25	0
Grenoble	Total		40	1	2	0	0	0	42	1
Chievo	2010–11	Serie A	32	3	0	0	—		32	3
Chievo	2011–12	Serie A	29	0	2	1	—		31	1
Chievo	2012–13	Serie A	22	0	1	0	—		23	0
Chievo	2013–14	Serie A	32	1	2	0	—		34	1
Chievo	2014–15	Serie A	28	0	1	0	—		29	0
Chievo	2015–16	Serie A	31	1	1	0	—		32	1
Chievo	2016–17	Serie A	17	1	3	1	—		20	2
Chievo	2017–18	Serie A	10	0	0	0	—		10	0
Chievo	2018–19	Serie A	14	1	1	0	—		15	1
Chievo	2019–20	Serie B	21	0	0	0	—		21	0
Chievo	Total		236	7	11	2	0	0	247	9
Career total			394	12	22	2	22	1	438	15

=== International ===
Appearances and goals by national team and year
National team	Year	Apps	Goals
Slovenia	2003	3	0
Slovenia	2004	6	1
Slovenia	2005	7	0
Slovenia	2006	4	1
Slovenia	2007	6	0
Slovenia	2008	6	0
Slovenia	2009	9	0
Slovenia	2010	11	2
Slovenia	2011	8	0
Slovenia	2012	6	1
Slovenia	2013	8	1
Slovenia	2014	7	0
Slovenia	2015	8	3
Slovenia	2016	6	1
Slovenia	2017	5	0
Slovenia	2018	1	0
Total		101	10

Scores and results list Slovenia's goal tally first, score column indicates score after each Cesar goal.

List of international goals scored by Boštjan Cesar
No.	Date	Venue	Opponent	Score	Result	Competition
1	9 October 2004	Arena Petrol, Celje, Slovenia	Italy	1–0	1–0	2006 FIFA World Cup qualification
2	11 October 2006	Dinamo Stadium, Minsk, Belarus	Belarus	1–1	2–4	UEFA Euro 2008 qualifying
3	3 March 2010	Ljudski vrt, Maribor, Slovenia	Qatar	2–0	4–1	Friendly
4	17 November 2010	Bonifika, Koper, Slovenia	Georgia	1–0	1–2	Friendly
5	15 August 2012	Stožice, Ljubljana, Slovenia	Romania	1–0	4–3	Friendly
6	7 June 2013	Laugardalsvöllur, Reykjavík, Iceland	Iceland	3–2	4–2	2014 FIFA World Cup qualification
7	5 September 2015	St. Jakob-Park, Basel, Switzerland	Switzerland	2–0	2–3	UEFA Euro 2016 qualifying
8	12 October 2015	San Marino Stadium, Serravalle, San Marino	San Marino	1–0	2–0	UEFA Euro 2016 qualifying
9	17 November 2015	Ljudski vrt, Maribor, Slovenia	Ukraine	1–0	1–1	UEFA Euro 2016 qualifying
10	4 September 2016	LFF Stadium, Vilnius, Lithuania	Lithuania	2–2	2–2	2018 FIFA World Cup qualification

== Honours ==
Dinamo Zagreb

- Prva HNL: 2002–03; runner-up: 2000–01, 2003–04
- Croatian Cup: 2001–02, 2003–04
- Croatian Supercup: 2002, 2003

Marseille

- Ligue 1 runner-up: 2006–07
- Coupe de France runner-up: 2006, 2007

West Bromwich Albion

- Football League Championship: 2007–08

== See also ==
- List of footballers with 100 or more caps
