= Arduino (name) =

Arduino is an Italian masculine name, with variants including Ardovino, Ardoino, Ardolino, Arduilio, Arduo and the feminine Arduina. It derives from the Germanic Hardwin (Ortwin), in medieval Italy found in the forms Ardovinus, Ardoinus and Arduinus. In English it is often rendered as Arduin.

== People with the given name Arduino ==
- Arduino Berlam (1880–1946), Italian architect
- Arduino Cantafora (born 1945), Italian architect and painter
- Arduino della Palude, 11th-century military tutor of Matilda of Tuscany
- Arduin of Ivrea (955–1015), Italian nobleman, king of Italy 1002–1014
- Arduin Glaber or Arduino Glabrione (died 977), Margrave of Turin
- Arduin the Lombard or Arduino di Melfi, 11th-century Greek-speaking Lombard nobleman

== People with the surname Arduino ==
- Anna Maria Arduino (1663–1700), writer and painter, the Princess of Piombino from Messina, Sicily
- Giovanni Arduino (1714–1795), known as the “father of Italian Geology”; Dorsum Arduino, a wrinkle ridge on the Moon, is named after him
- Pietro Arduino (1728–1805), botanist; brother of the geologist Giovanni Arduino; and his son Luigi Arduino (1750–1833)

== See also ==
- Arduino (disambiguation)
