= Faini =

Faini is a surname. Notable people with the surname include:

- Caesar Andrade Faini (1913–1995), Ecuadorian painter and teacher
- Dario Faini (born 1976), Italian songwriter, record producer, and pianist
- Diamante Medaglia Faini (1724–1770), Italian poet
