= Ardolino =

Ardolino is an Italian surname. It comes probably from Arduino (name). Notable people with this surname include:

- Edward Ardolino (1883–1945), American architectural sculptor
- Emile Ardolino (1943–1993), American film director
- Tom Ardolino (1955–2012), American musician
