= Arduino (disambiguation) =

Arduino may refer to:

- Arduino (name), list of people with this given name and surname
- Arduino, the micro-controller platform
- Dorsum Arduino, a wrinkle ridge on the Moon
