= Passon =

Passon is a surname. Notable people with the surname include:

- Felicity Passon (born 1999), Seychellois swimmer
- Ortwin Passon (born 1962), German activist
- Stacie Passon (born 1969), American film director, screenwriter, and producer

== See also ==
- Michael Passons (born 1965), American singer-songwriter
