= Ortwin (name) =

Ortwin (also Ortuin, Latinized Ortuinus) is a German given name, from ort "point" and win "friend".

It has been conflated with the name Hartwin (also Hardwin, Arduinus, Arduino), from hart "hard, brave" and win "friend", especially in the case of Hardwin von Grätz (1475–1542), better known in English as Ortwin, a German humanist scholar and theologian.

== Given name ==
Ortwin has been used as a modern given name since the early 20th century:

- Ortwin Czarnowski (born 1940), German cyclist
- Ortwin De Wolf (born 1996), Belgian footballer
- Ortwin Freyermuth (born 1958), German American video game executive, entertainment lawyer and film producer
- Ortwin Gamber (1925–2008), Austrian art historian
- Ortwin Hess (born 1966), German theoretical physicist
- Ortwin Linger (1967–1989), Dutch-Surinamese footballer
- Ortwin Passon (born 1962), German gay, HIV/AIDS and human rights activist
- Ortwin Rodewald, East German rower
- Ortwin Runde (born 1944), German politician and mayor

== Surname ==
- Ostap Ortwin (real name Oskar Katzenellenbogen) (1876–1942), Polish Jewish journalist and literary critic

== See also ==
- Arduino (name)
