= Leonardo Targa =

Italian physician, numismatist, and writer

Alessandro Tanara (20 October 1729 – Verona, 28 February 1815) was an Italian physician, numismatist, and writer.

== Biography ==
He was born in Verona; his father, a lawyer, had him educated first in his native city, then at the University of Padua, under Morgagni and Giulio Pontedera. Alessandro traveled to Florence and Rome, and from ancient manuscripts there edited translations of the ancient Latin works of Aulus Cornelius Celsus, published under the title Celsi Opera first printed in Padua in 2 volumes (quarto) in 1769, and again in Verona in 1814.

Targa was also a known numismatist. He taught medicine in Pavia. His biography was written by Giovanni Battista Zoppi.
