= Pietro Arduino =

Italian botanist (1728–1805)

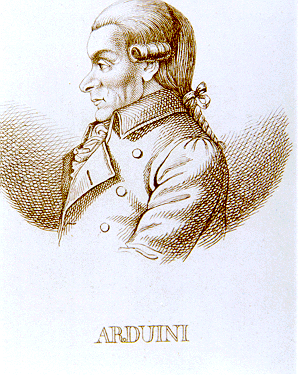
- Pietro Arduino
- Born: 28 July 1728; Caprino Veronese, Republic of Venice
- Died: 13 April 1805 (aged 76); Padua, Kingdom of Italy
- Scientific career
- Fields: Botany
- Workplaces: Orto botanico di Padova; University of Padua
- Author abbrev. (botany): Ard.

Notes
- He is the brother of Giovanni Arduino.

Pietro Arduino (18 July 1728 – 13 April 1805) was an Italian botanist. He was custodian of the Botanical Garden of Padua in the period between the death of Giulio Pontedera and the appointment of his successor, Giovanni Marsili. Arduino was the first to give courses in agricultural science at an Italian university. The geologist Giovanni Arduino (1714–1795) was his brother, and the agriculturalist Luigi Arduino (1750–1833) was his son.

== Biography ==
Pietro Arduino was born in 1728 in the small village of Caprino on the slopes of Monte Baldo outside Verona. Given their limited financial means, the family could only afford education for one son the eldest, Giovanni, who eventually became a respected geologist. To Pietro, however, these economic disadvantages were partially compensated for by the simple fact of having been born in the Monte Baldo area.

In fact, the area was famous for its flora and attracted many botanists keen to study the many interesting species of plants to be found there. One such visitor was the French antiquarian and botanist Jean-François Séguier whose arrival marked a turning point in the life of young Pietro Arduino. Séguier had originally come to Verona after repeated and insistent invitations from the scholar and historian Francesco Scipione Maffei and he had ended up staying in the city for a number of years. During this period he spent a lot of time studying the flora of the Verona region - which inevitably meant paying repeated visits to Monte Baldo. His guide on these excursions was the young Pietro Arduino, who was thus initiated into the world of botanical research. Séguier soon recognised the great potential of his young guide and saw that with adequate education Pietro could have been much more than a mere plant scout.

In 1750 he wrote a letter of presentation to the then prefetto of the Padua Botanical Garden, Giulio Pontedera, and convinced the young Arduino to pay the illustrious botanist a visit. Pontedera had the young man appointed as a gardener, and then in 1753 raised him to the post of Head Gardener. Though modest, Arduino's position in the Garden allowed him to do groundwork in botanical theory and practice, and thus paved the way for a career in the subject. At that time Pontedera was a botanist of European fame and the plants he gathered for the Garden during his long prefecture were important both in quantitative and qualitative terms. When Pontedera died, the Riformatori decided to appoint Arduino as acting prefetto while they decided on a successor. To mark the fact that the post was only an interim one - and yet at the same time raise Arduino from his previous position of head gardener - the young man was given the unusual title of Custodian of the Botanical Garden of Padua.

When Pontedera's successor, Giovanni Marsili, was finally appointed he confirmed Arduino in his sievious position. However, given that he had been a successful independent scientist for two years, the young man did not feel inclined to accept this demotion and sought to improve his status.

After a vain attempt to persuade the Venetian Senate to set up a chair of applied botany, a few years later he had suggested establishing a chair of agriculture. Over the years the main economic interests of the Serenissma had shifted from maritime trade to the exploitation of the vast landed estates on the mainland, so that when Pietro Arduino wrote proposing himself for the position of Professor of Agriculture, the Riformatori were more than willing to listen. Thus in 1763 the first university chair of agriculture in Italy was established. Subsequently, on 30 May 1765, Arduino was made full professor of agriculture and then in 1766 he founded an experimental farm (of which he was the first prefetto). He continued to hold these posts until his death on 13 April 1805.

== Selected works ==
- Animadversionum botanicarum specimen (in Latin). Vol. 1. Padua: Giovanni Battista Conzatti. 1759.
  - Animadversionum botanicarum specimen (in Latin). Vol. 2. Venice: Francesco Sansoni. 1764.
- Memorie di osservazioni e di sperienze sopra la cultura e gli usi di varie piante, 1766.
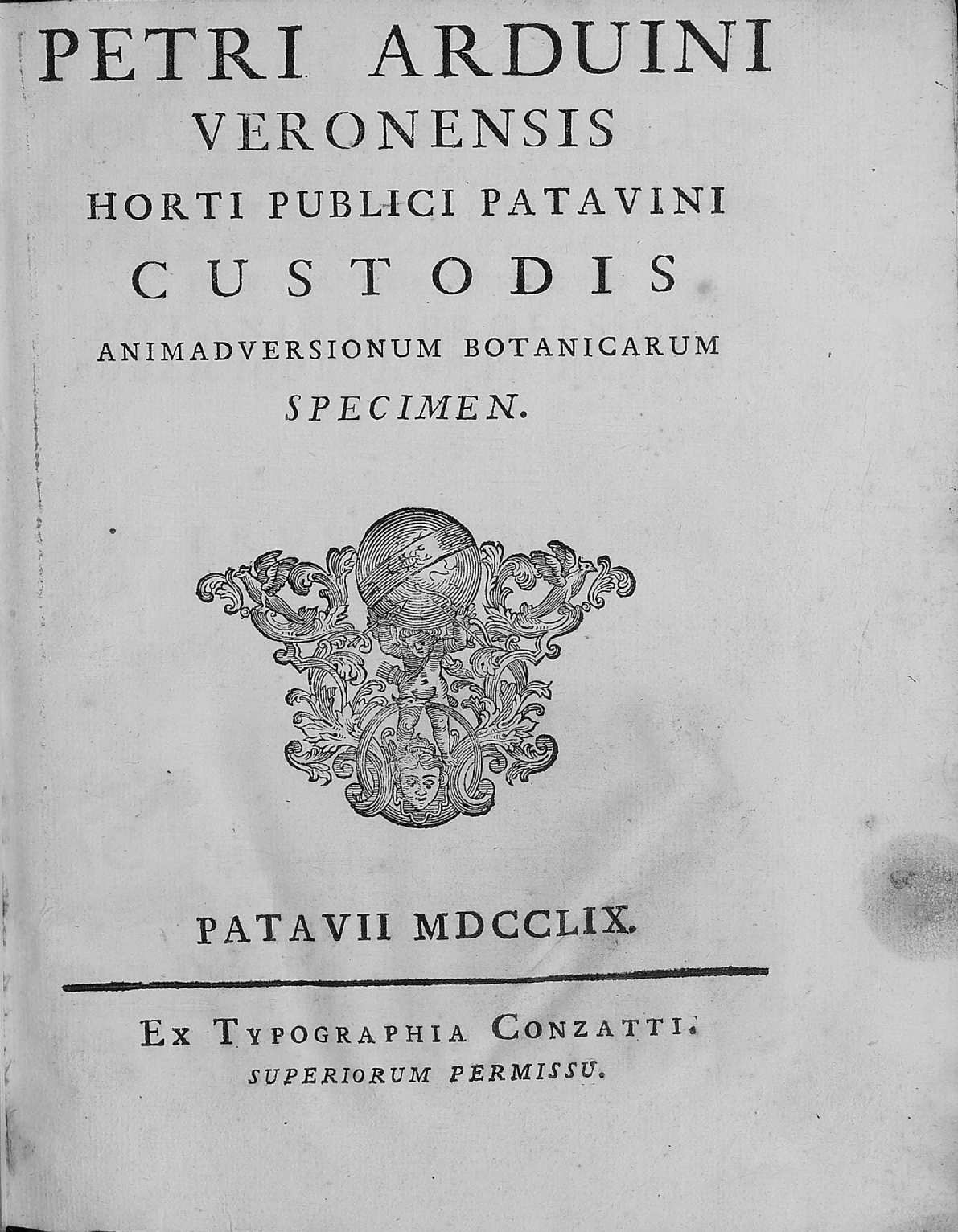
Animadversionum botanicarum specimen, 1759

== Standard author abbreviation ==
The standard author abbreviation Ard. is used to indicate this person as the author when citing a botanical name.

== Bibliography ==
- Fritz Encke; Günther Buchheim; Siegmund Seybold, eds. (1984). Zander Handwörterbuch der Pflanzennamen (13th ed.). Stuttgart: Ulmer Verlag. ISBN 3-8001-5042-5.
- Lusina, Giuseppe (1962). "ARDUINO, Pietro". Dizionario Biografico degli Italiani (in Italian). Vol. 4: Arconati–Bacaredda. Rome: Istituto dell'Enciclopedia Italiana. OCLC 883370.
