= After the Future =

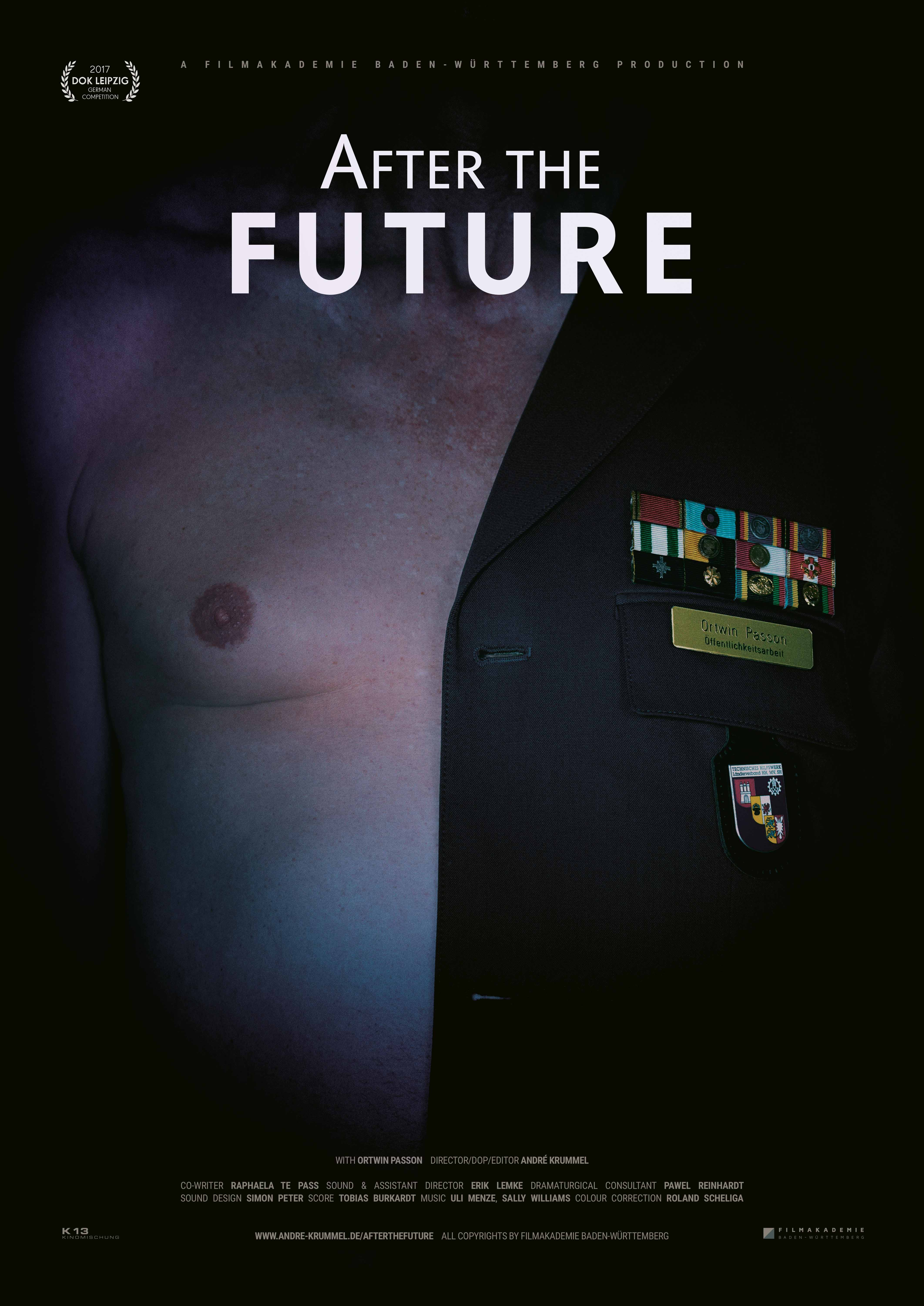
- Nach der Zukunft
- Directed by: André Krummel
- Screenplay by: André Krummel, Raphaela te Pass
- Produced by: Filmakademie Baden-Württemberg
- Starring: Ortwin Passon; Rüdiger Lautmann; Mads Elung-Jensen; Chou-Chou de Briquette; Uli Menze; Wolf-Dieter Narr
- Cinematography: André Krummel
- Edited by: André Krummel
- Music by: Tobias Burkardt
- Release date: 31 October 2017
- Running time: 46 minutes
- Country: Germany
- Language: German

After the Future is a documentary film by André Krummel. It premiered on 31 October 2017 as part of the 60th DOK Leipzig in Germany.

== Content ==
The documentary explores the private and professional life of HIV-positive human rights activist Ortwin Passon. More than twenty years has passed since the AIDS related death of his boyfriend. Passon himself, however, is still alive - against his own expectations. The film investigates several philosophical and legal themes while following Passon in his normal life volunteering at Germany's Federal Agency for Technical Relief as well as attending bareback sex parties. The connection between his private and his professional life becomes obvious, when Ortwin meets his doctoral adviser to work on a Doctoral Thesis about barebacking as a basic human right - the right of HIV positive men to have unprotected anal sex.

== Production ==
The film is a production by the Filmakademie Baden-Württemberg and was made during André Krummel's third year at film school. Krummel met Passon by chance in a café in 2013. Shooting took place the following three years in a team of two together with Krummel's assistant director and sound recordist Erik Lemke.

== Reception ==
Christian Eichler from the German internet radio and podcast label Detektor.fm says André Krummel uses the film to draw a sensitive portrait with many unanswered questions. The film has been marked as controversial due to scenes of a sexual nature and explicit drug use. The documentary received further positive press from the online magazine Berliner Filmfestivals, stating that the film remained "very close" to the protagonist and makes an "important contribution to the discussion of sexual morality and perversion."

== Awards ==
After the Future premiered at DOK Leipzig in 2017 and received an Honorary Mention in the German Competition for Long Documentary and Animated Film Award. It was further nominated for several awards, including the ver.di Prize for Solidarity, Humanity and Fairness and the DEFA Sponsoring Award.
