= Diamante Medaglia Faini =

Italian poet (1724–1770)

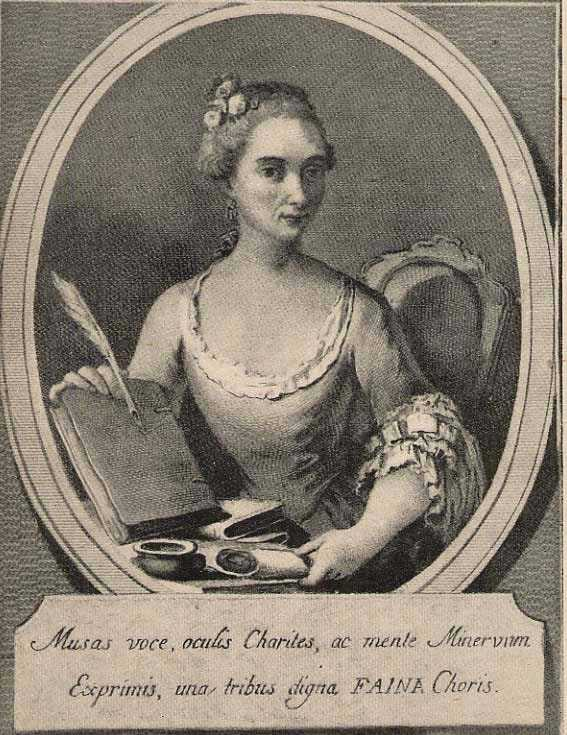
- Diamante Medaglia Faini
- Born: 28 August 1724; Savallo, Brescia, Republic of Venice
- Died: 13 June 1770 (aged 45)
- Other names: Nisea Corcirense
- Occupations: Italian composer and poet

Diamante Medaglia Faini (28 August 1724 – 13 June 1770) was an Italian poet and advocate for women's education.

== Biography ==
Faini was on 28 August 1724 in Savallo, Brescia in the Republic of Venice.

Faini was a member of the academies Accademia degli Agiati (1751), Accademia degli Orditi in Padua, under the name Nisea Corcirense, and Accademia dell'Arcadia in Rome (1757). She was known for her love poems, and also composed sonnets and madrigals. She also presented an oratory before Unanimi of Salò, championing women's education, which cited the classical the philosophers Cicero, Aristotle, Plato, Socrates, and Horace, as well as theologians Jean Mabillon, Saint Basil the Great, Charles Rollin and Clement of Alexandria.

Faini was the daughter of the doctor Antonio Medaglia, and married the doctor Pietro Antonio Faini in 1748. Her father arranged the marriage because he disliked her fame, and the marriage forced her to stop using love as a theme of her poems. She was a controversial poet, and stopped her activity in the academies when they tried to force her to adjust herself to accepted convention.

Faini spent her later life studiying French, philosophy and history (under Domenico Bonetti of Volciano), mathematics and science (under Giovanni Battista Suardi).

Faini died on 13 June 1770.

== Sources ==
- "Medaglia Faini Diamante — Scienza a due voci". scienzaa2voci.unibo.it.
