= Giovanni Poleni =

Italian physicist, mathematician and antiquarian (1683–1761)

Giovanni Poleni FRS
- Rosalba Carriera, Portrait of Giovanni Poleni, 1735-1740, Saint-Cloud, Musée du Grand Siècle
- Born: 23 August 1683; Venice, Republic of Venice
- Died: 15 November 1761 (aged 78); Padua, Republic of Venice
- Resting place: Basilica del Carmine, Padua
- Occupations: Physicist, mathematician and antiquarian
- Spouse: Orsola Roberti (m. 1708)
- Children: 6
- Parent(s): Giacomo Poleni and Isabella Poleni (née de' Brugnol)
- Scientific career
- Workplaces: University of Padua

Giovanni Poleni FRS (Italian pronunciation: [dʒoˈvanni ˈpolɛni]; 23 August 1683 – 15 November 1761) was a Marquess, physicist, mathematician and antiquarian.

== Early life ==
Giovanni Poleni was born in Venice on 23 August 1683, the only son of Marquess Jacopo Poleni and Elisabetta Broliuola. His father, a scholar and poet, had enlisted as a volunteer in the Imperial Army and served under Charles V of Lorraine during the Siege of Buda. In recognition of his service, he was granted the title of marquess and the rank of Imperial Knight on 30 June 1685. Giovanni studied classics, philosophy, theology, mathematics and physics at the School of the Somaschi Fathers in Venice. In 1707, he befriended Giovanni Battista Morgagni, the father of modern anatomical pathology, and became one of his closest collaborators. On 30 December 1708, he married Orsola Roberti, a noblewoman from Bassano del Grappa, with whom he had six children. One of their daughters, Elisabetta, married the botanist Giulio Pontedera.

== Career ==
Poleni was appointed, at the age of twenty-five, professor of astronomy at the University of Padua. In 1715 he was assigned to the chair of physics, and in 1719 he succeeded Nicholas II Bernoulli as professor of mathematics. As an expert in hydraulic engineering he was charged by the Venetian Senate with the care of the waters of lower Lombardy and with the constructions necessary to prevent floods. He was also repeatedly called in to decide cases between sovereigns whose states were bordered by waterways.

Poleni was the first to build a calculator that used a pinwheel design. Made of wood, his calculating clock was built in 1709; he destroyed it after hearing that Anton Braun had received 10,000 Guldens for dedicating a pinwheel machine of his own design to the emperor Charles VI of Vienna. Poleni described his machine in his Miscellanea in 1709, but it was also described by Jacob Leupold in his Theatrum Machinarum Generale ("The General Theory of Machines") which was published in 1727. In 1729, he also built a tractional device that enabled logarithmic functions to be drawn. Poleni's observations on the impact of falling weights (similar to Willem 's Gravesande's) led to a controversy with Samuel Clarke and other Newtonians that became a part of the so-called "vis viva dispute" in the history of classical mechanics.

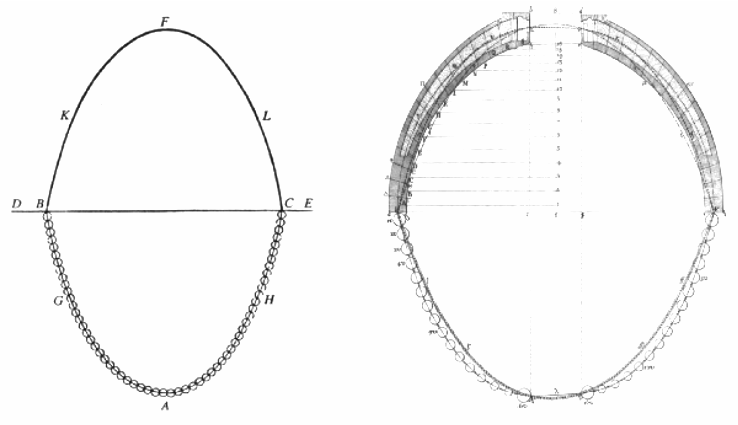
Poleni's graphic calculation for the St. Peter's cupola (right)

In 1739, the Venetian Senate decreed the establishment of a chair in experimental philosophy at the University of Padua, entrusting it to Poleni. To support his lectures on mechanics, hydrostatics and optics, Poleni established the Teatro di Filosofia Sperimentale (Theatre of Experimental Philosophy), the first dedicated physics laboratory opened within an Italian university. He assembled a Physics Cabinet containing around 400 scientific, mathematical and meteorological instruments, which became a centre of scientific reference at a European level.

His knowledge of architecture caused Benedict XIV to call him to Rome in 1748 to examine the cupola of St. Peter's, which was rapidly disintegrating. As part of the structural investigation of the dome he used a correctly loaded hanging chain to determine its funicular shape. He promptly indicated the repairs necessary. He also wrote a number of antiquarian dissertations. In 1710 he was elected a Fellow of the Royal Society, in 1739 the French Academy of Sciences made him a member and later the Prussian and the Russian Academies of Sciences did the same. The city of Padua elected him as magistrate, and after his death erected his statue by Canova. Venice also honoured him by striking a medal. Giordano Riccati and Giovanni Battista Suardi were among his pupils.

== Principal works ==
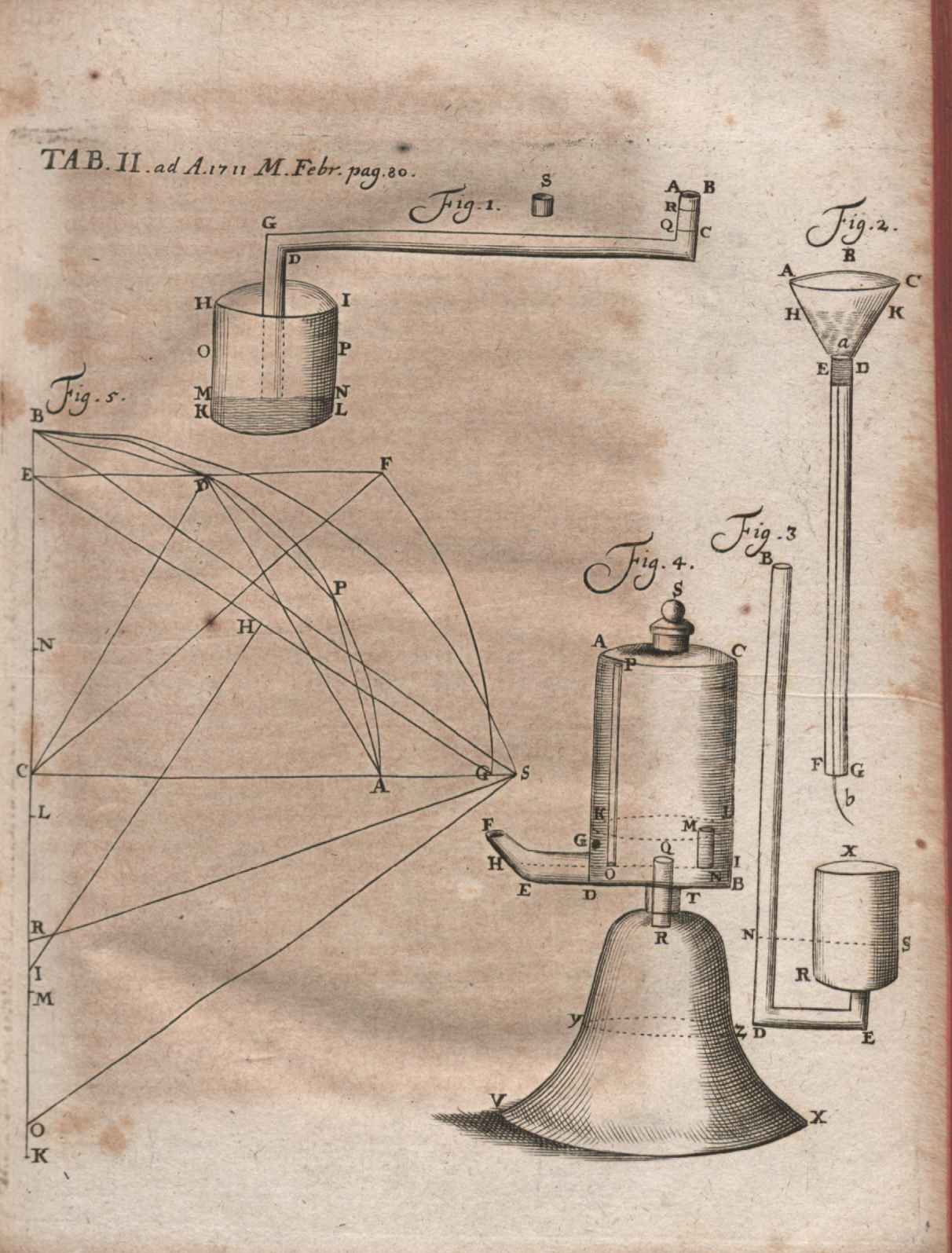
Illustration of critique of Miscellanea... published in Acta Eruditorum, 1711

- Architecturae navalis principia (in Latin). Padova: Tipografia del Seminario. 1700.
- Dissertatio de barometris et thermometris (in Latin). Venezia: Alvise Pavini. 1709.
- Miscellanea (dissertations on physics), Venice, 1709;
- De vorticibus coelestibus dialogus (in Latin). Padova: Giovanni Battista Conzatti. 1712.
- Observatio solaris eclipsis habita Patavii 5. Nonas Maias 1715 (in Latin). Padova: Giovanni Battista Jean Victor PonceletConzatti. 1715.
- De physices in rebus mathematicis utilitate praelectio (in Latin). Padova: Giovanni Battista Conzatti. 1716.
- Ioannis Poleni ... De motu aquae mixto libri duo. Quibus multa nova pertinentia ad aestuaria, ad portus, atque ad flumina continentur. Patavii: typis Iosephi Comini. 1717.
- Ioannis Poleni ... De castellis per quae derivantur fluviorum aquae habentibus latera convergentia liber. Quo etiam continentur nova experimenta ad aquas fluentes, & ad percussionis vires pertinentia ...¦. Patavii: typis Iosephi Comini. 1718.
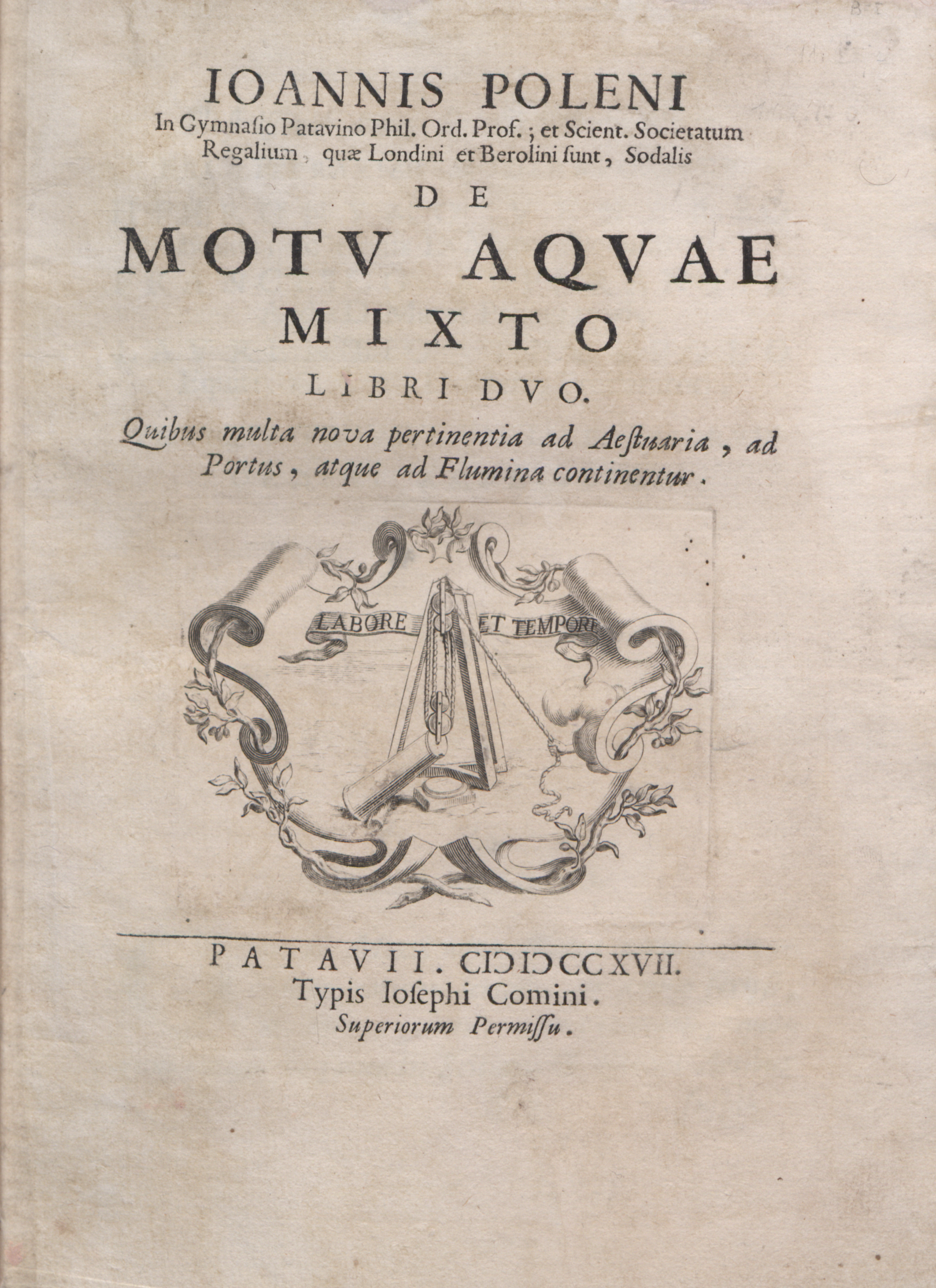
  De motu aquae (1717)
  De castellis per quæ derivantur fluviorum latera convergentia, Padua, 1720;
- Mercurius in Sole visus (in Latin). Padova. 1723.
- Epistolae duae (in Latin). Padova. 1724.
- De la meilleure maniere de mesurer sur mer le chemin d'un vaisseau, independemment des observations astronomiques. ... par m. le marquis Poleni. A Paris: de l' Imprimerie royale. 1734.
- Exercitationes Vitruvianæ Venice, 1739;
- Institutionum philosophiae mechanicae experimentalis specimen (in Latin). Padova: Tipografia del Seminario. 1741.
- Il tempio di Diana di Efeso (The Temple of Diana at Ephesus); Venice, 1742.
- Partis mathematica doctrinae motus animalium (in Latin). Padova: Tipografia del Seminario. 1743.
- Doctrina architecturae militaris nec non architecturae civilis (in Latin). Padova: Tipografia del Seminario. 1756.
- De re navali (in Latin). Padova: Tipografia del Seminario. 1757.
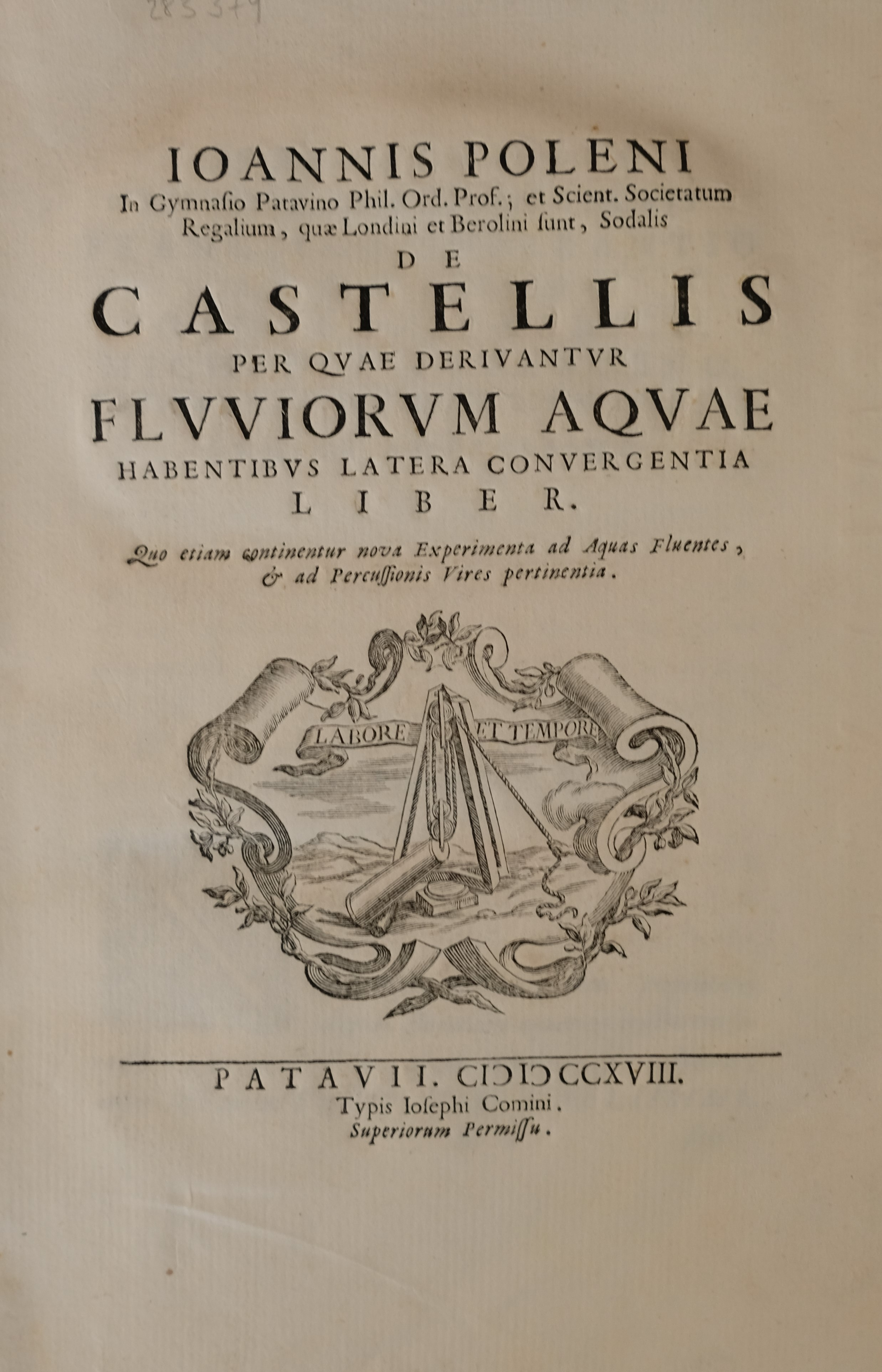
Title page to De Castellis per quae derivantur fluviorum aquae habentibus latera convergentia liber (1718)

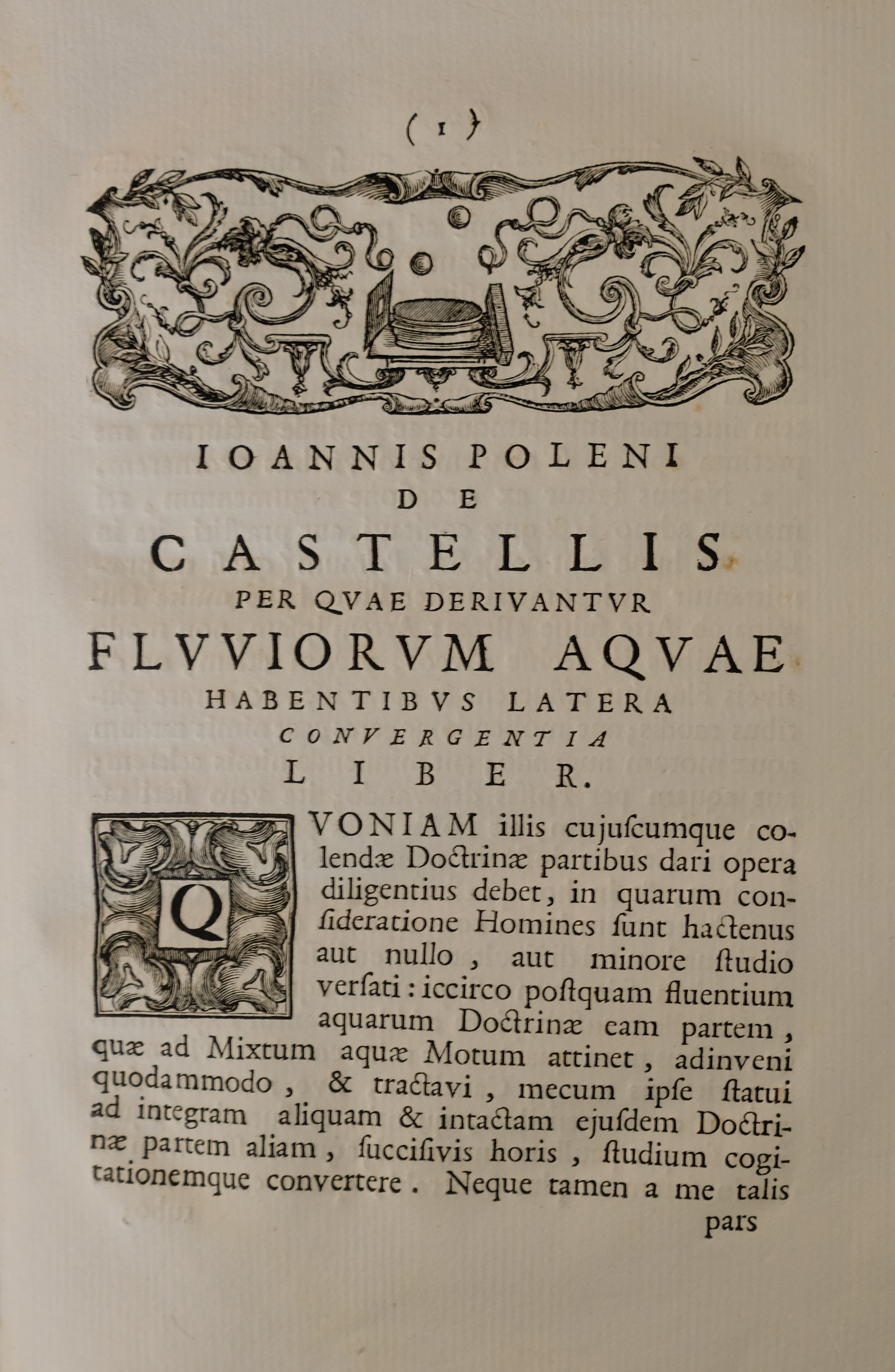
First page to De Castellis per quae derivantur fluviorum aquae habentibus latera convergentia liber (1718)

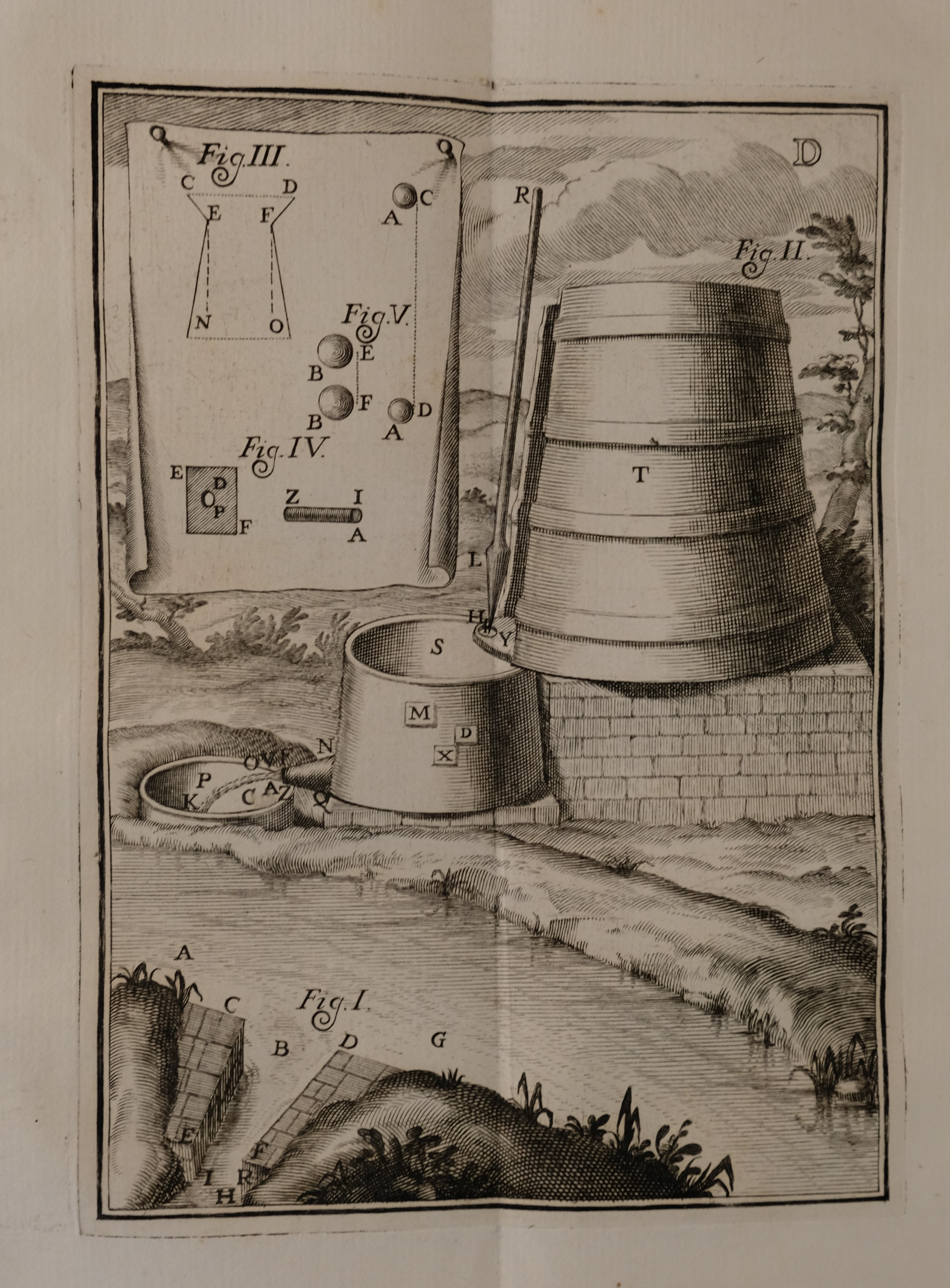
Figure from De Castellis per quae derivantur fluviorum aquae habentibus latera convergentia liber (1718)
