= Giulio Pontedera =

Italian botanist

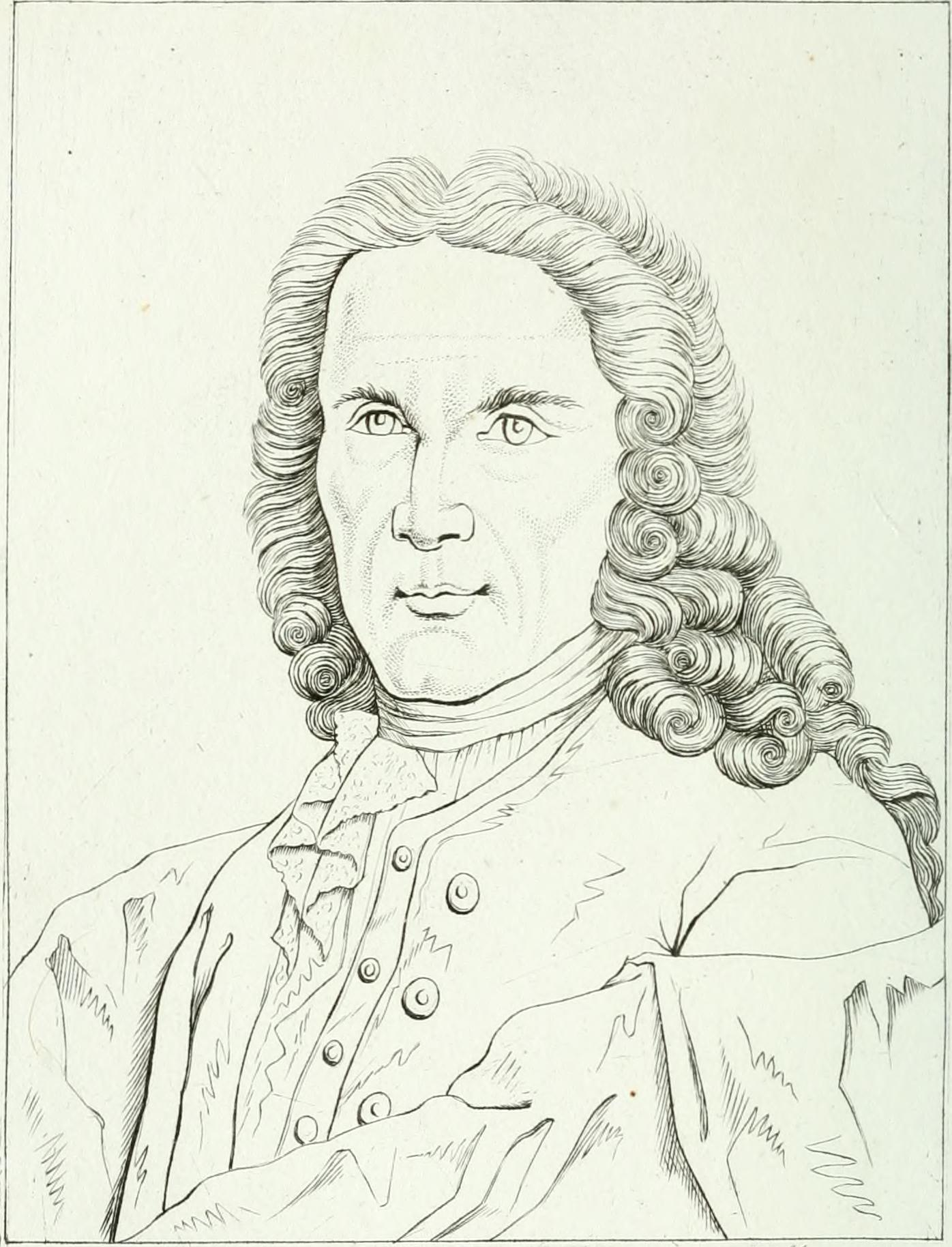
- Giulio Pontedera
- Born: 7 May 1688; Lonigo, Republic of Venice
- Died: 3 September 1757 (aged 69); Lonigo, Republic of Venice
- Education: University of Padua
- Spouse: Elisabetta Poleni (m. 1740)
- Scientific career
- Fields: Botany
- Workplaces: Orto botanico di Padova
- Author abbrev. (botany): Ponted.

Giulio Pontedera (7 May 1688 – 3 September 1757) was an Italian botanist of Tuscan origin. He was professor of botany at Padua, and director of the botanical garden there. Although he rejected Carl Linnaeus' system, Linnaeus was a correspondent of Pontedera's, and named the genus Pontederia after him.

== Biography ==
Born in Lonigo near Vicenza, Pontedera came from a family of Pisan origin which had settled in the Republic of Venice. He took his degree at the University of Padua in 1715, and was the first pupil and then esteemed colleague of Giovanni Battista Morgagni.

His interest botany developed early and Pontedera published his first important work on the subject in 1718. A year later he was appointed as a university teacher of botany, at the same time as he was made prefetto of the Botanical Garden.

His predecessor Felice Viali had done so much to reorganise the Garden that Pontedera described him as the 'second father' of the institution (after Francesco Bonafede). Viali's efforts had been concentrated on the architectural and structural aspects of the Garden, whereas the actual collection of plants had gradually been depleted.

At the end of the seventeenth century, the head gardener Tommaso Andreola and his son Santo enjoyed such powerful political backing that they could simply ignore whatever orders Viali gave them. The end result was that when Pontedera was appointed he found that the Garden contained only a total of 530 plants (130 potted).

The arrival of the new prefetto did not change the attitude of the Andreola family, who in fact took advantage of Pontedera's absences on plant-finding missions to sell off plants and tools. Then, finally, Pontedera managed to have the two dishonest gardeners dismissed in December 1721. Their successors included Pietro Arduino who, after Pontedera's death, was appointed custodian of the Botanical Garden and held the post for three years, before going on to occupy the newly-created chair of agriculture at the University of Padua.

After the dismissal of the Andreola, Pontedera set about building up plant stocks and in a few years the Garden had some 7,000 plants (with an extra 5,000 potted plants). He also had heated greenhouses built and the balustrade around the enclosure wall completed. These projects were accompanied by regular restoration and maintenance work to the buildings in the Garden.

In 1740 Pontedera married Elisabetta Poleni, the daughter of the famous Paduan physicist Giovanni Poleni. Pontedera was not only a botanist known throughout Europe, he was also an erudite man with a vast range of interests in literature and archaeology. He held the post of prefetto up to his death in on 3 December 1757, while visiting his small Lonigo estate where he usually spent the summer months.

== Works ==
- Anthologia (in Latin). Padova: Tipografia del Seminario. 1720.

== Standard author abbreviation ==
The standard author abbreviation Ponted. is used to indicate this person as the author when citing a botanical name.
