= Giovanni Arduino =

Italian geologist (1714–1795)

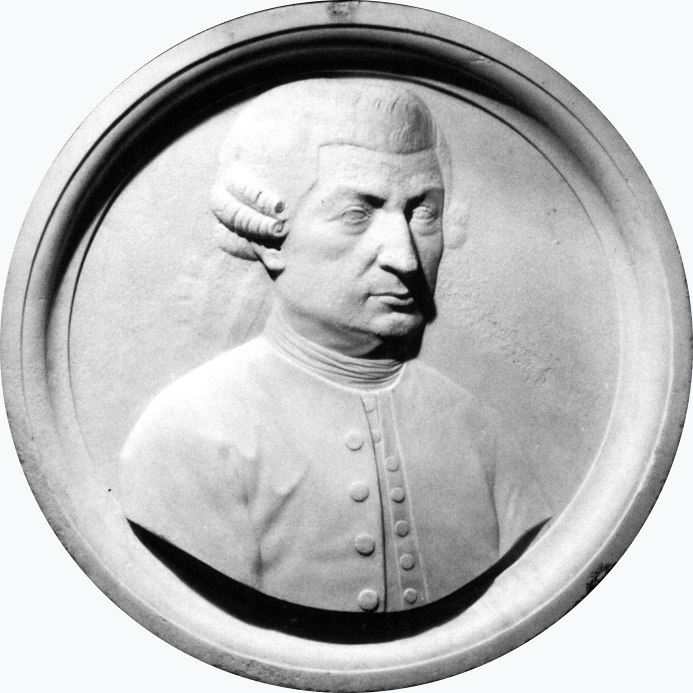
- Medal of Giovanni Arduino. Panteon Veneto, Istituto Veneto di Scienze, Lettere ed Arti
- Born: 16 October 1714; Caprino Veronese, Veneto, Italy
- Died: 21 March 1795 (aged 80); Venice, Republic of Venice
- Known for: Stratigraphy
- Scientific career
- Fields: Geology
- Workplaces: University of Padua

Notes
- He is the brother of Pietro Arduino.

Giovanni Arduino (16 October 1714 – 21 March 1795) was an Italian geologist who is known as the "Father of Italian Geology". Arduino proposed the division of the earth's crust into four general and successive orders: Primary, Secondary, Tertiary and Quaternary, a classification regarded as the starting point for modern stratigraphy.

== Biography ==
Arduino was born on 16 October 1714 at Caprino Veronese, a small village in the Republic of Venice, from a poor family of farmers. His brother was the botanist Pietro Arduino. From an early age, Arduino showed an interest in mining. He studied at Verona but did not take a degree. At eighteen he began an apprenticeship as a technician in the iron mines in Klausen, near Bolzano, South Tyrol. Arduino became quickly knowledgeable about mineralogy and metallurgy and developed an interest in paleontology.

As a result of his practical experience he became recognized as a mining expert, in which capacity he served several Italian administrations. In 1769, Arduino was nominated agricultural superintendent of the Venetian Republic. He finally became professor of mineralogy at the University of Padua and a member of the Accademia nazionale delle scienze.

Arduino corresponded with several leading European naturalists, including Lazzaro Spallanzani, Giovanni Scopoli, Déodat Gratet de Dolomieu, Carl Linnaeus, and Horace Bénédict de Saussure. He died in Venice on 21 March 1795. The lunar ridge Dorsum Arduino is named after him.

== Contributions ==
Arduino developed possibly the first classification of geological time, based on study of the geology of northern Italy. He divided the history of the Earth into three periods: Primitive, Secondary, and Tertiary.

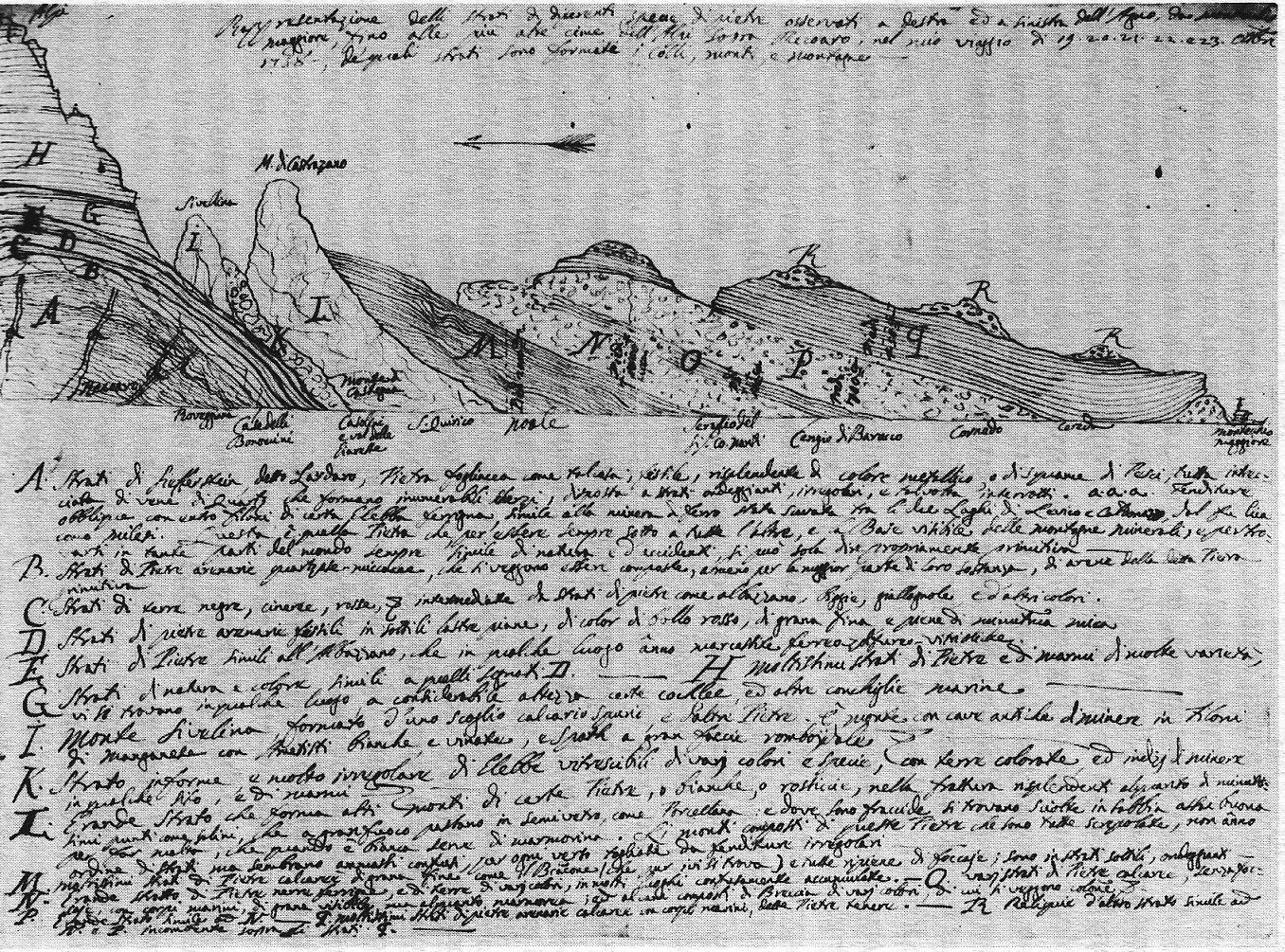
Arduino's stratigraphic section in the province of Vicenza (pen and ink) 1758

The scheme proposed by Arduino in 1759, which was based on much study of rocks of the southern Alps, grouped the rocks into four series. These were (in addition to the Volcanic or Quaternary) as follows: the Primary series, which consisted of schists from the core of the mountains; the Secondary, which consisted of the hard sedimentary rocks on the mountain flanks; and the Tertiary, which consisted of the less hardened sedimentary rocks of the foothills. Because this arrangement did not always hold true for mountain ranges other than the Alps, the Primary and the Secondary were dropped in the general case. However, the term 'Tertiary' has persisted in geological literature until its recent replacement by the Palaeogene and Neogene periods. The last period of the Cenozoic Era is still known as the Quaternary period. The Cenozoic was studied and further determined by, among others, the English geologist (and mentor of Charles Darwin) Charles Lyell.

== Bibliography ==
- Rodolico, Francesco (1970). "Giovanni Arduino". Dictionary of Scientific Biography. Vol. 1. New York: Charles Scribner's Sons. pp. 233–234. ISBN 0-684-10114-9.
- Gliozzi, Mario (1962). "ARDUINO, Giovanni". Dizionario Biografico degli Italiani (in Italian). Vol. 4: Arconati–Bacaredda. Rome: Istituto dell'Enciclopedia Italiana. OCLC 883370.
- Vaccari, Ezio (2006). "The 'Classification' of Mountains in Eighteenth Century Italy and the Lithostratigraphic Theory of Giovanni Arduino (1714–1795)". In Gian Battista Vai; W. Glen E. Caldwell (eds.). The Origins of Geology in Italy. Boulder, CO: Geological Society of America. pp. 155–175. ISBN 0813724112.
- Ell, Theodore (2011). "Two Letters of Signor Giovanni Arduino, Concerning his Natural Observations: First Full English Translation. Part 1". Earth Sciences History. 30 (2): 267–286. Bibcode:2011ESHis..30..267E. doi:10.17704/eshi.30.2.22r632j0x453gj45.
- Vaccari, Ezio (2013). "Arduino, Giovanni". Il Contributo italiano alla storia del Pensiero: Scienze. Rome: Istituto dell'Enciclopedia Italiana.
- Gibbard, P.L. (January 2019). "Giovanni Arduino - the man who invented the Quaternary". Quaternary International. 500: 11–19. doi:10.1016/j.quaint.2019.04.021.
