= Arduino della Palude =

Arduino della Palude (or Arduino da Palù) was the military tutor of Matilda of Tuscany in the late eleventh century. He taught her to ride a horse, carry a lance and pike, and wield an axe and sword. In her adulthood he was the commander of her armies.

In 1061 Rome was enveloped in a civil war, with partisans of the Antipope Honorius II holding Trastevere and the Castel Sant'Angelo while the supporters of the legitimate Pope Nicholas II were sustained in the city by the wealth and mercenaries of Leo de Benedicto, who eventually dislodged the antipapists from the castle. An army commanded by Godfrey, former Duke of Lower Lorraine, and Arduino, along with the young Matilda, arrived on the scene and skirmished with the forces of Honorius led by Guibert of Ravenna. Arduino is said to have led a force of 400 archers, 400 pikemen, and a regiment of cavalry with which he charged Guibert, who was trying to join battle with Godfrey, and forced him to retreat.

In 1111 the Emperor Henry V entered Rome to be crowned and left the city with Pope Paschal II, Bernard, Bishop of Parma, and Bonsignore, Bishop of Reggio as prisoners and took to the Sabine country. Matilda promptly sent Arduino to secure their release, which he did through negotiations.
