= Giambattista Suardi =

Italian mathematician

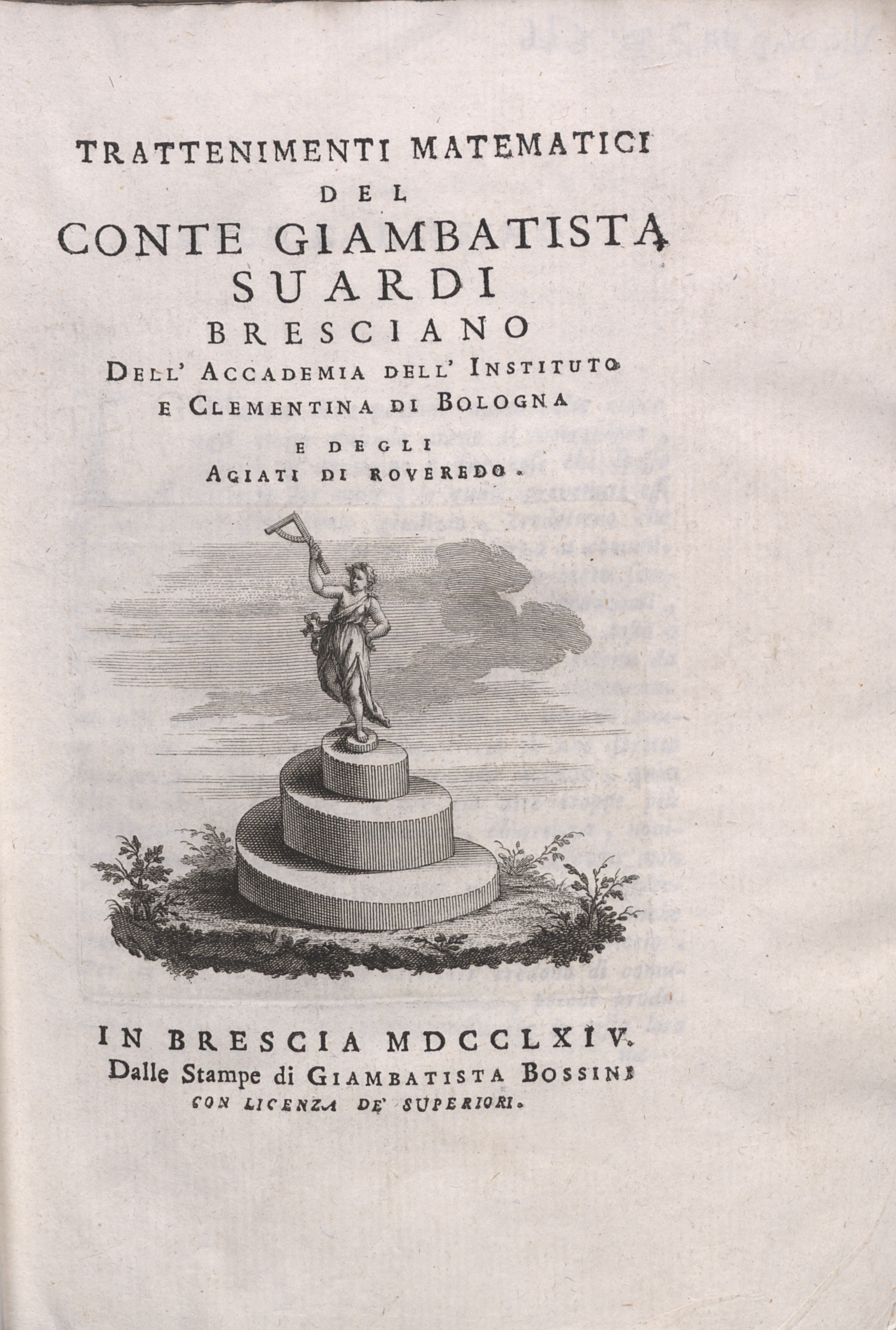
Trattenimenti matematici, 1764

Giambattista Suardi (January 9, 1711 – March 2, 1767) was an Italian mathematician.

== Life ==
Born into a noble family in Brescia, he studied mathematics in Padua both in the Republic of Venice. Suardi graduated in 1773 under the supervision of Giovanni Poleni. In 1752 he published an essay on drawing and mathematics tools: Nuovi istromenti per la descrizione di diverse curve antiche e moderne e di molte altre che servir possono alla speculazione de' geometri ed all'uso de' pratici: col progetto di due nuove macchine per la nautica ed una per la meccanica, e con alcune osservazioni sopra de' poligoni rettilinei regolari.

He married Cecilia Curti, a Venetian woman.

== Works ==
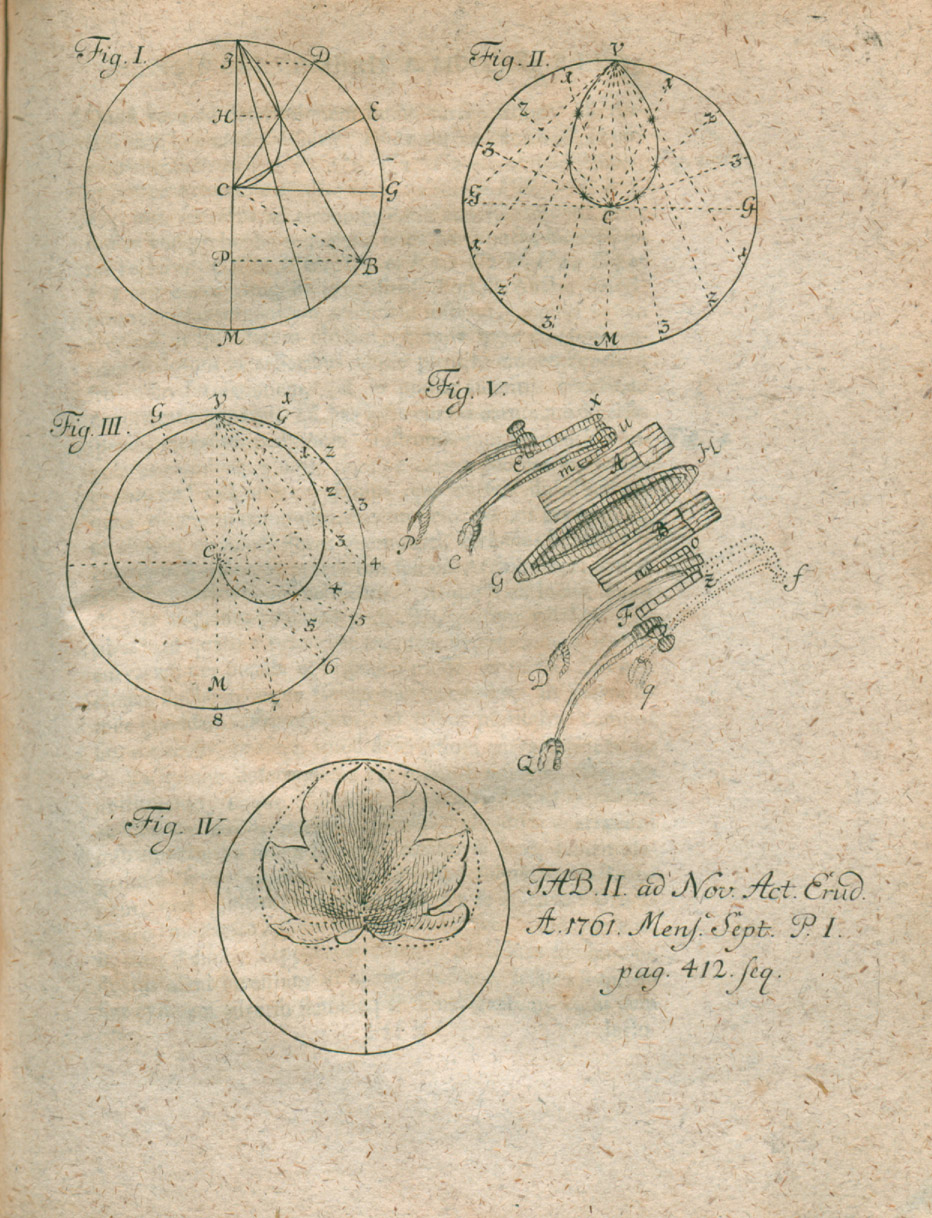
Illustration of critique of Nuovi instrumenti per la descrizione etc. published in Acta Eruditorum, 1761

- Suardi, Giambattista (1752). Nuovi istromenti per la descrizione di diverse curve antiche e moderne (in Italian). In Brescia: dalle stampe di Gian Maria Rizzardi.
- Suardi, Giambattista (1764). Trattenimenti matematici (in Italian). In Brescia: Giovanni Battista Bossini.
