= Ortwin Passon =

Ortwin Passon (born in 1962 in Frankfurt-Höchst, West Germany) is a German gay, HIV/AIDS and human rights activist.

== Life and work ==
Passon was born in a working-class family and was the only son, out of three, to obtain qualifications that allowed him to apply for university. He came out as gay, having attended the gay and lesbian youth group, Pink Power, in Frankfurt on Main. Passon went on to study political science at the Free University of Berlin. In 1989, he further studied postgraduate law at the Goethe University Frankfurt. Passon worked in a German bank. He travelled several times to former German colonies in the West Pacific, to complete essays for the respected historian Karl-Heinz Grundmann. Several of Passons papers regarding sexual science and cultures have been published in specialist magazines and in national press, and are considered to be influential.

== Volunteer activism ==
Passon has volunteered extensively in numerous organisations, including Germany's Federal Agency for Technical Relief (which offers support for disasters both in Germany and abroad), the German Life Saving Association and the German Sports Confederation. His activism intensified during his studies, where he sat on the editorial board of the Schwule Presseschau (translating as Gay Press Review, later the Gay and Lesbian Press Review), archived in Berlin's Schwules Museum. He also sat on the board of the gay and lesbian sports club Vorspiel SSL (translating as foreplay), where they specialise in a vast number of sports including volleyball, swimming, tennis etc. Since 2000, Passon has been a member of the new Scientific-Humanitarian Committee (whk). He published several papers in sexual political magazines, including Gigi – Zeitschrift für sexuelle Emanzipation and junge Welt. In addition, Passon has volunteered as an honorary judge in the Superior State Social Court of the states of Berlin and Brandenburg since 2005.

== Awards ==
Passon has been honoured with twelve state awards for his achievements, including the strictly limited Honorary Pin for Special Social Commitment of the state of Berlin in 2016. As a left-wing critic of repressive sexual policy, he declined accepting the cross of merit of the high-ranking Order of Merit of the Federal Republic of Germany.

== Sexual activism ==
Passon's highly acclaimed essay, "Barebacking @ Sex Academy", defines the difference between "unsafe sex" of men who have sex with men (MSM) and "barebacking" as risk-conscious and consensual, unprotected anal intercourse (UAI), regardless of the presence of sexually transmitted infections (STI). The paper was selected for publication in the latest booklet "Sexualität und Strafe" (translating as "Sexuality and Punishment"), featuring in the Kriminologisches Journal (translating as Criminological Journal), by the distinguished sexual scientists, Daniela Klimke and Rüdiger Lautmann. He has also written extensively not just about barebacking, gay rights, but also sex work in Germany.

== Documentary ==
Passon is featured as the protagonist in the critically acclaimed documentary, After the Future (German: Nach der Zukunft). It was filmed between 2013 and 2016. Since the world premiere of the film on 31 October 2017 at the 60th DOK Leipzig Film Festival, Passon has been "outed" publicly as being gay with HIV. The film about him received an Honorary Mention in the German Competition for Long Documentary and Animated Film and was further nominated for several awards, including the esteemed Ver.di Prize for Solidarity, Humanity and Fairness and the prestigious DEFA Sponsoring Award.

== Publications ==
=== Scientific publications ===
(Selective)

- Ortwin Passon & Karin Sausen: Coming-out-Probleme durch Aids. Eine empirische Untersuchung. Verlag Rosa Winkel, Berlin 1986, ISBN 9783921495131
- Ortwin Passon: Barebacking @ Sex Academy. In: Daniela Klimke & Rüdiger Lautmann (Hrsg.): Sexualität und Strafe. 11. Beiheft Kriminologisches Journal. Beltz-Juventa, Weinheim 2016, ISBN 978-3-7799-3511-7, p. 248–264

=== Legal policy publications ===
(Selective)

- Ortwin Passon: Kein Virus ohne Moral. Wie rechte Parteien und willige Medien ein Feindstrafrecht gegen Barebacker herbeiführten. In: Gigi. Zeitschrift für sexuelle Emanzipation, 49/2007, p. 6–10
- Ortwin Passon: Präventionsgeschäft. Sexuelle Barebacker zu jagen macht viel mehr Spaß, wenn die sozialen Barebacker einen dafür bezahlen. Ein sexualpolitischer Beitrag zu Barebacking. In: Gigi. Zeitschrift für sexuelle Emanzipation, 34/2002, p. 10–12
- Ortwin Passon: Jetzt wird erst Recht angeschafft. Ein Einstieg ins künftige Prostituiertenrecht. Ein sexualpolitischer Beitrag zu konkurrierenden Gesetzesentwürfen im Gesetzgebungsverfahren. In: Gigi. Zeitschrift für sexuelle Emanzipation, 13/2001, p. 22–23
