= Dorsum Arduino =

Wrinkle ridge on the Moon

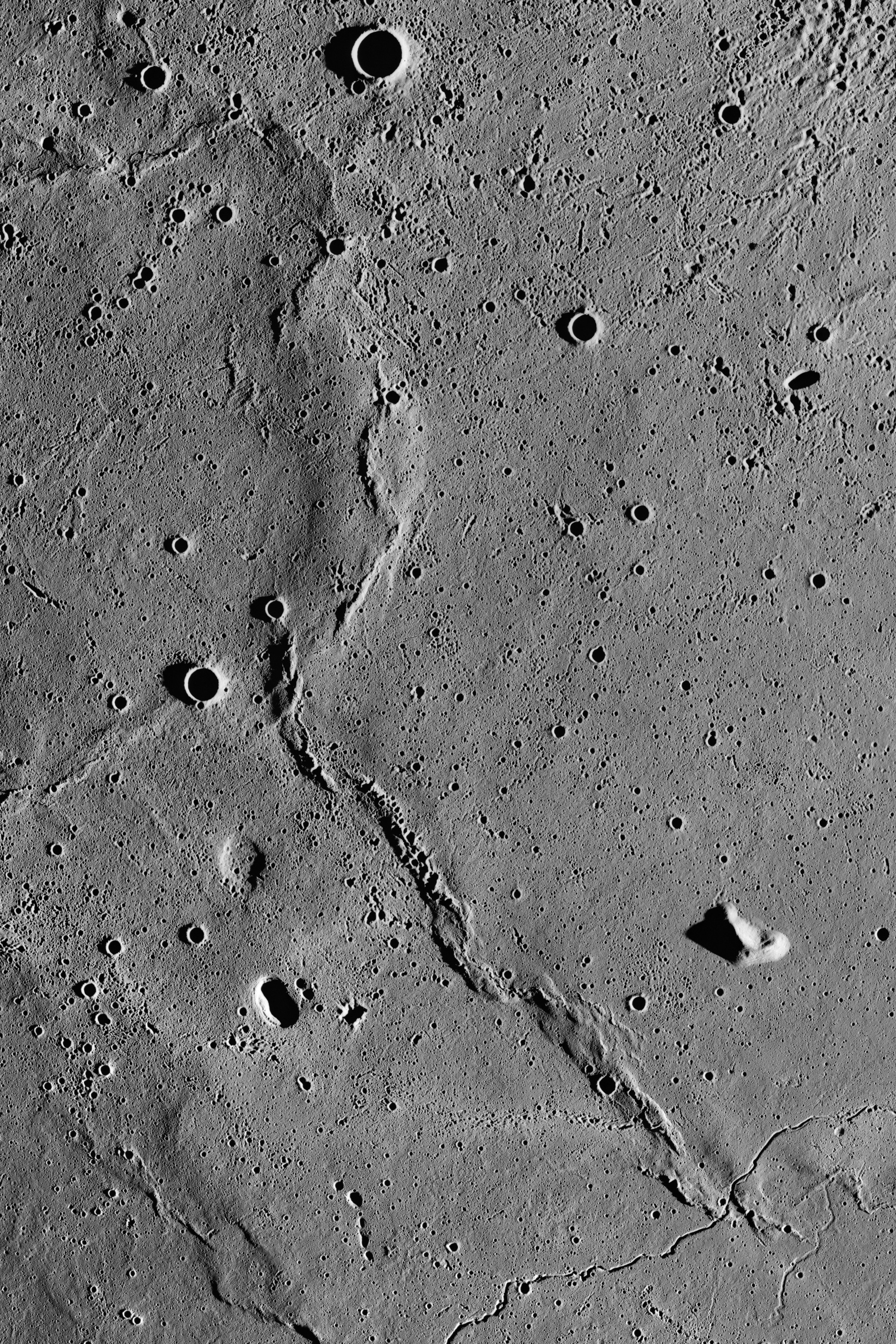
Dorsum Arduino, from Apollo 15

Dorsum Arduino is a wrinkle-ridge at 24.9°N 35.8°W in the border region between Oceanus Procellarum and Mare Imbrium on the Moon. It is 100 km long and was named after Italian geologist Giovanni Arduino in 1976.
