= Orto botanico di Padova =

Botanical garden in Padua, Italy

Botanical Garden (Orto Botanico), Padua
UNESCO World Heritage Site
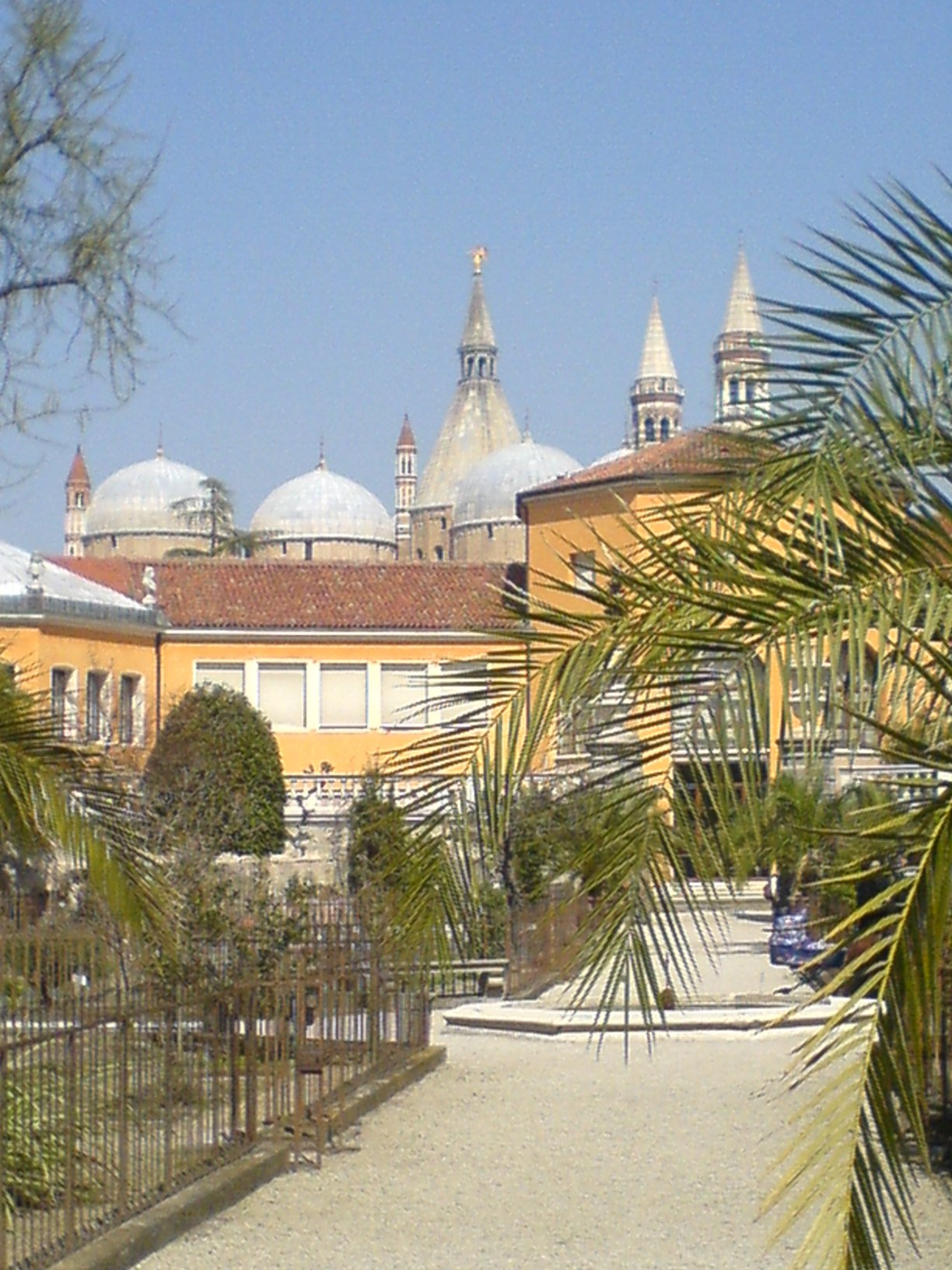
- The Botanical Garden of Padua; in the background, the Basilica of Sant'Antonio.

- Location within Veneto Location within Italy
- Location: Padua, Veneto, Italy
- Criteria: Cultural: (ii), (iii)
- Reference: 824
- Inscription: 1997 (21st Session)
- Area: 2.2 ha (5.4 acres)
- Buffer zone: 11.4 ha (28 acres)
- Website: www.ortobotanicopd.it/en
- Coordinates: 45°23′56.8″N 11°52′50.4″E

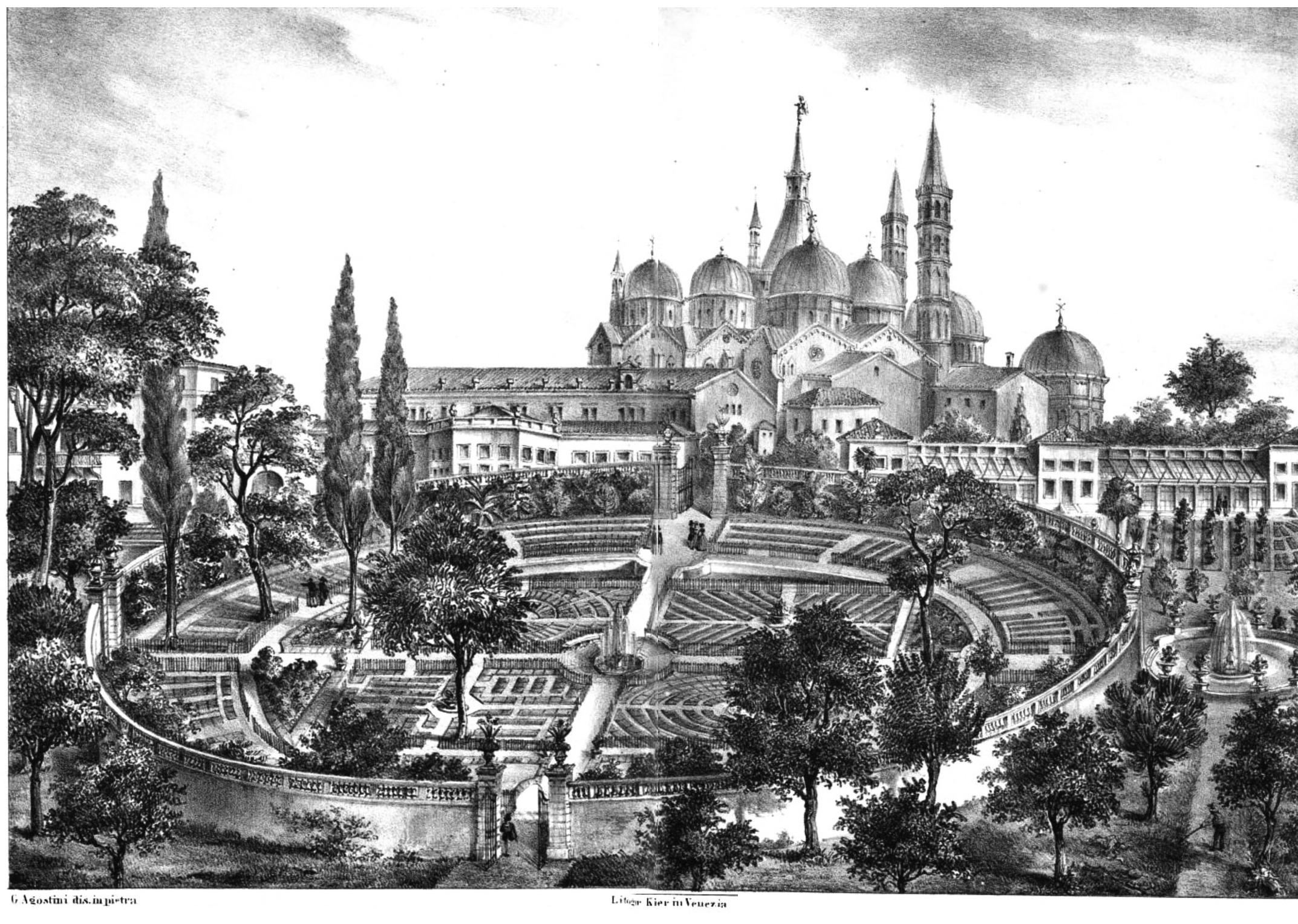
The Botanical Garden of Padova (or Garden of the Simples) in a 16th-century print; in the background, the Basilica of Sant'Antonio

The Orto Botanico di Padova is a botanical garden in Padua, in the northeastern part of Italy. Founded in June 1545 by the Venetian Republic, it is the world's oldest academic botanical garden that is still in its original location. The garden – operated by the University of Padua and owned by the Italian government – encompasses roughly 22,000 square meters (240,000 sq ft), and is known for its special collections and historical design.

== History ==
The Garden of Padua was founded upon deliberation of the Senate of the Venetian Republic. It was devoted to the growth of medicinal plants, the so-called "simple plants" (Orto dei semplici – simples were herbs that were used as they are rather than in admixtures) which produced natural remedies, and also to help students distinguish genuine medicinal plants from false ones to prevent misidentifications of plants, as this could lead to severe death and injury in patients.

A circular wall enclosure was built to protect the garden from the frequent night thefts which occurred in spite of severe penalties (fines, prison, exile). The Botanical Garden was steadily enriched with plants from all over the world, particularly from the countries that participated in trade with Venice. Consequently, Padua had a leading role in the introduction and study of many exotic plants, and a herbarium, a library and many laboratories were gradually added to its Botanical Garden.

At present, the Botanical Garden allows for intensive didactic activity as well as important research to be conducted on its grounds. It also cares for the preservation of many rare species. In 1997, it was listed by UNESCO as a World Heritage Site on the following grounds:

The Botanical Garden of Padua is the original of all botanical gardens throughout the world, and represents the birth of science, of scientific exchanges, and understanding of the relationship between nature and culture. It has made a profound contribution to the development of many modern scientific disciplines, notably botany, medicine, chemistry, ecology and pharmacy.

== Architecture ==
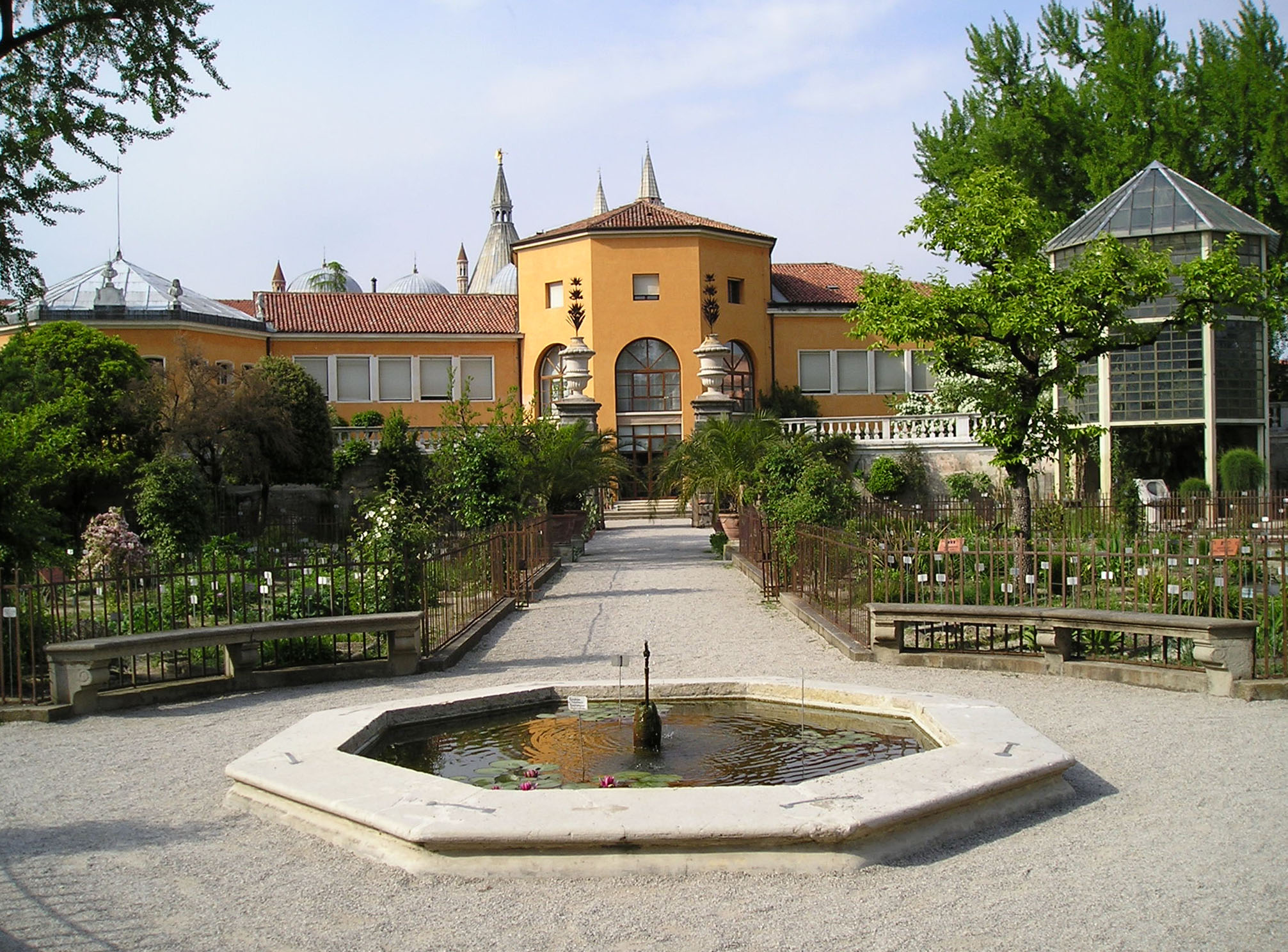
The entrance

The design of the Botanical Garden is commonly attributed to Andrea Moroni, who created some of the most important public monuments in Padua, such as the Basilica di Santa Giustina in Prato della Valle, the town hall and the university in the first half of the 16th century. However, the real architect was Daniele Barbaro, a Venetian nobleman who was a man of vast learning and translator of Vitruvius' De Architectura. He followed the example of the medieval Horti Conclusi, (enclosed gardens), marking the architecture by a perfect pattern of a square within a circle (84 metres in diameter), divided into four parts by two paths oriented according to the cardinal points. The Botanical Garden was inaugurated in 1545, and used as a teaching facility by the University of Padua in the following year.

A few years after the foundation a circular enclosure wall was built to prevent the theft of plants. The current appearance of the principal palace dates back to the 17th and 18th centuries. By the end of the 16th century, the garden was enriched with many fountains fed by a gigantic wheel hydrophore, to ensure proper irrigation. In 1704, four gates and gateways were built with huge embellished acroterions (ornaments) in red stone, decorated with plants made of wrought iron. During the first half of the 18th century, the wall was refined along the external perimeter by a balustrade made of Istria Stone on which vases and half-length portraits of important persons were placed. A statue of Theophrastus was built beside the south door, as well as a statue of Solomon, (signed by Antonio Bonazza), local point for the east door and the four seasons fountain, which was enriched with 18th-century portraits made of Carrara marble. In the first half of the 19th century, greenhouses and a botanic theatre were built and half-length portraits of eminent botanists such as Carl Linnaeus were placed on the cornice. One of the greenhouses still maintains these historic arches and small cast-iron columns.

In the garden there are also three sundials: a cubic one, a circular one and a cylindrical one. On the inside, four glacises are divided into collections of flower-beds. At the center, a pool of water for the aquatic plants is fed by a continuous jet of hot water which comes from a water-bearing stratum of earth located 300 meters (980 ft) below the level of the garden.

== Trees ==
Until 1984, the Botanical Garden boasted a Vitex agnus-castus (chaste tree) that dated from at least 1550. At present, the oldest plant is a Mediterranean dwarf palm planted in 1585 called "Goethe's palm", because the poet Goethe referred to it in his essay "Geschichte meines botanisches Studiums"; this tree is situated in a greenhouse inside the Ortus Sphearicus. Other old trees are a ginkgo from 1750; a male specimen onto which a female branch was grafted in the mid-19th century for teaching purposes, and a magnolia dating back to 1786, which are regarded as the oldest specimens in Europe. A gigantic plane tree in the outside Arboretum dates from 1680; it has a hollow trunk, owing to a lightning strike. In the Arboretum there is also a sectioned trunk of an elm tree, which died in 1991, with marked year rings. There is also a Himalayan cedar, the first specimen to be imported into Italy in 1828.

== Collections ==
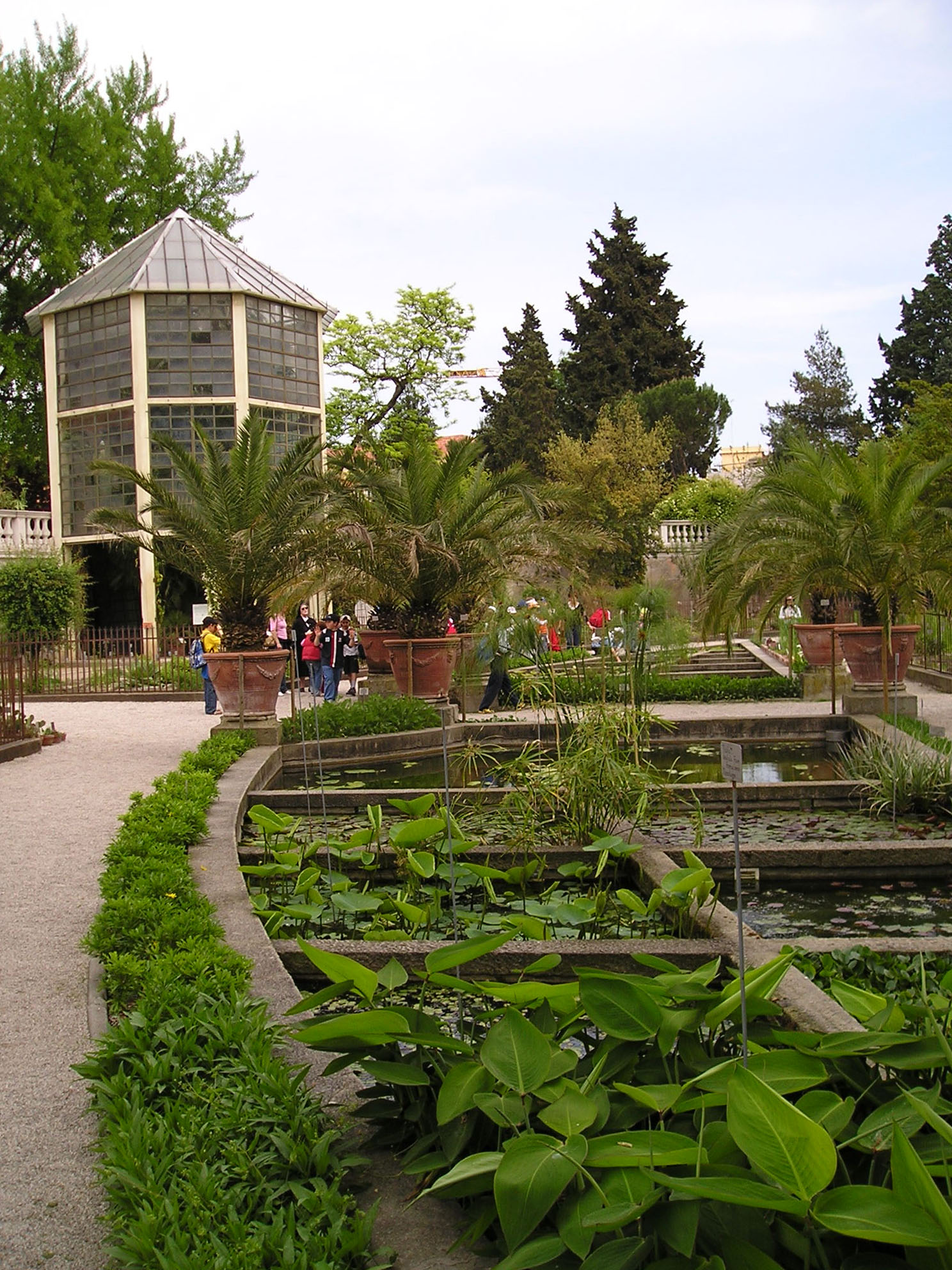
Tanks of aquatic plants and the "Goethe palm" greenhouse

Owing to a shortage of hothouses, the plants are mainly located outdoors. Six thousand types of plants are currently being cultivated and arranged according to taxonomic, utilitarian, ecological-environmental and historical standards. The systematic collection is concentrated in the four biggest central flowerbeds. Among the utilitarian collections, the medicinal plants are the most important. These are classified according to the Engler system, based on evolutionary relationships among the families. Each plant is labelled with its scientific name and its principal therapeutical properties. A poisonous plants collection has recently been set up with didactic aims: many of these poisonous plants are found also in the medicinal plants sector because in suitable quantities they can be used to treat illness and diseases.

Collections of the garden include:

- Insectivorous plants: found in nitrogen-poor soils, these plants must use the proteins of some small insects captured with their leaves to avoid deficiencies.
- Medicinal and Poisonous plants: plants representing the original purpose of the Botanical Garden.
- Plants From the Euganean Hills and Triveneto Region: a collection of representative plants from the Euganean Hills and the area surrounding the Botanical Garden.
- A section devoted to the collection, preservation and study of plants in danger of extinction.
- Orchids
- Aquatic plants
- Alpine plants
- Mediterranean plants

== Habitats ==
- Mediterranean Maquis: contains typical coastal vegetation from the Mediterranean basin, a climate characterised by hot summers and mild winters. An impenetrable scrub is composed of a thick evergreen underbrush and trees as well as many climbing plants, often thorned.
- Alpine Garden: a typical Alpine climate, set above the mountain wood. Characterised by tracts of rocky detritus kept together by plant roots, shrubs, and small twisted trees such as the mugho pine and the dwarf juniper.
- Fresh Water Habitat: water plants are grown here in many tanks, and undergo similar adaptations caused by the habitats despite their original species.
- Succulent Plants: a reconstructed desert habitat (in spring and summer).
- Orchid Greenhouses: hot humid micro-habitat that allows the cultivation of tropical forest plants.
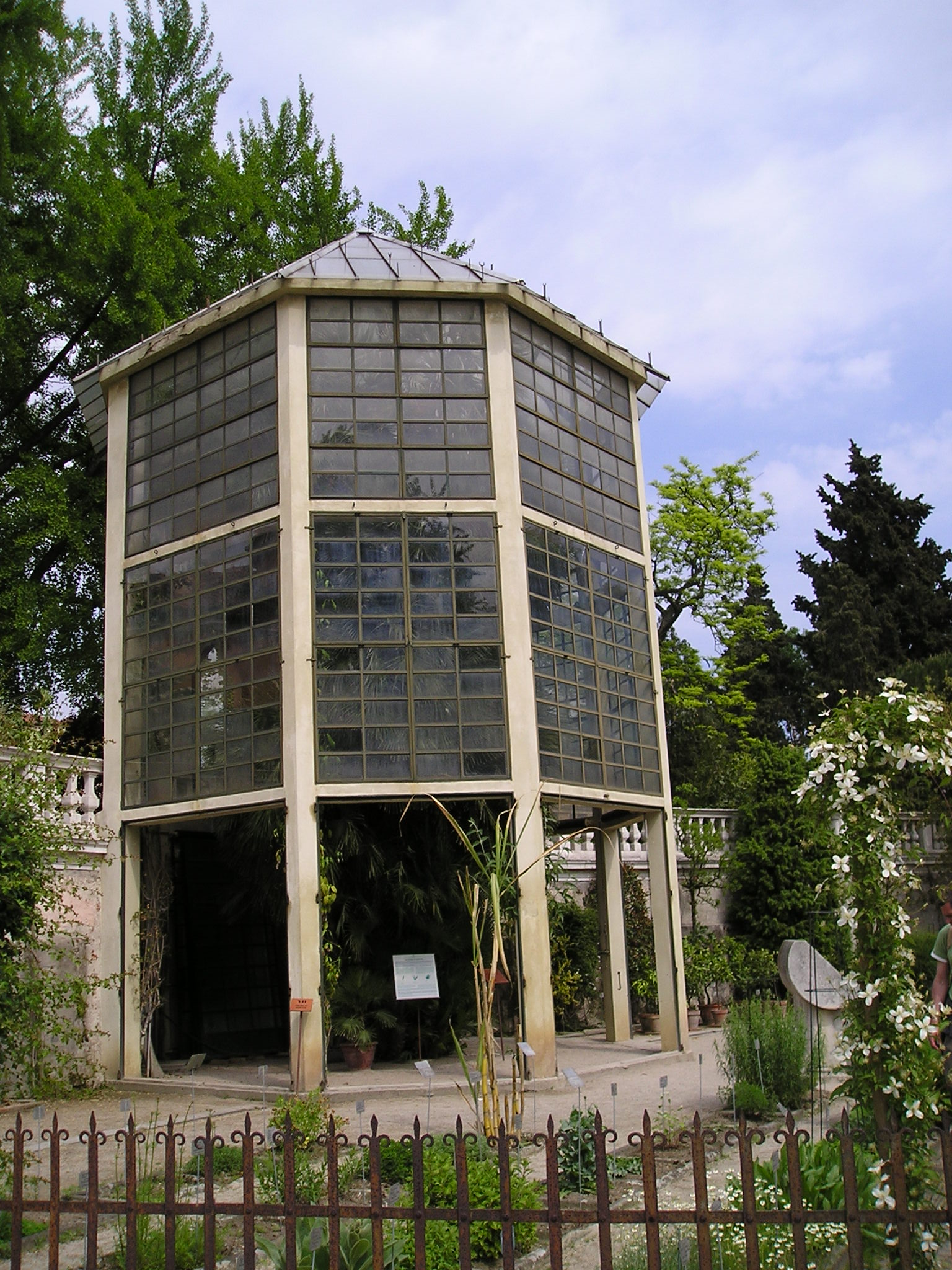
The "Goethe palm" greenhouse

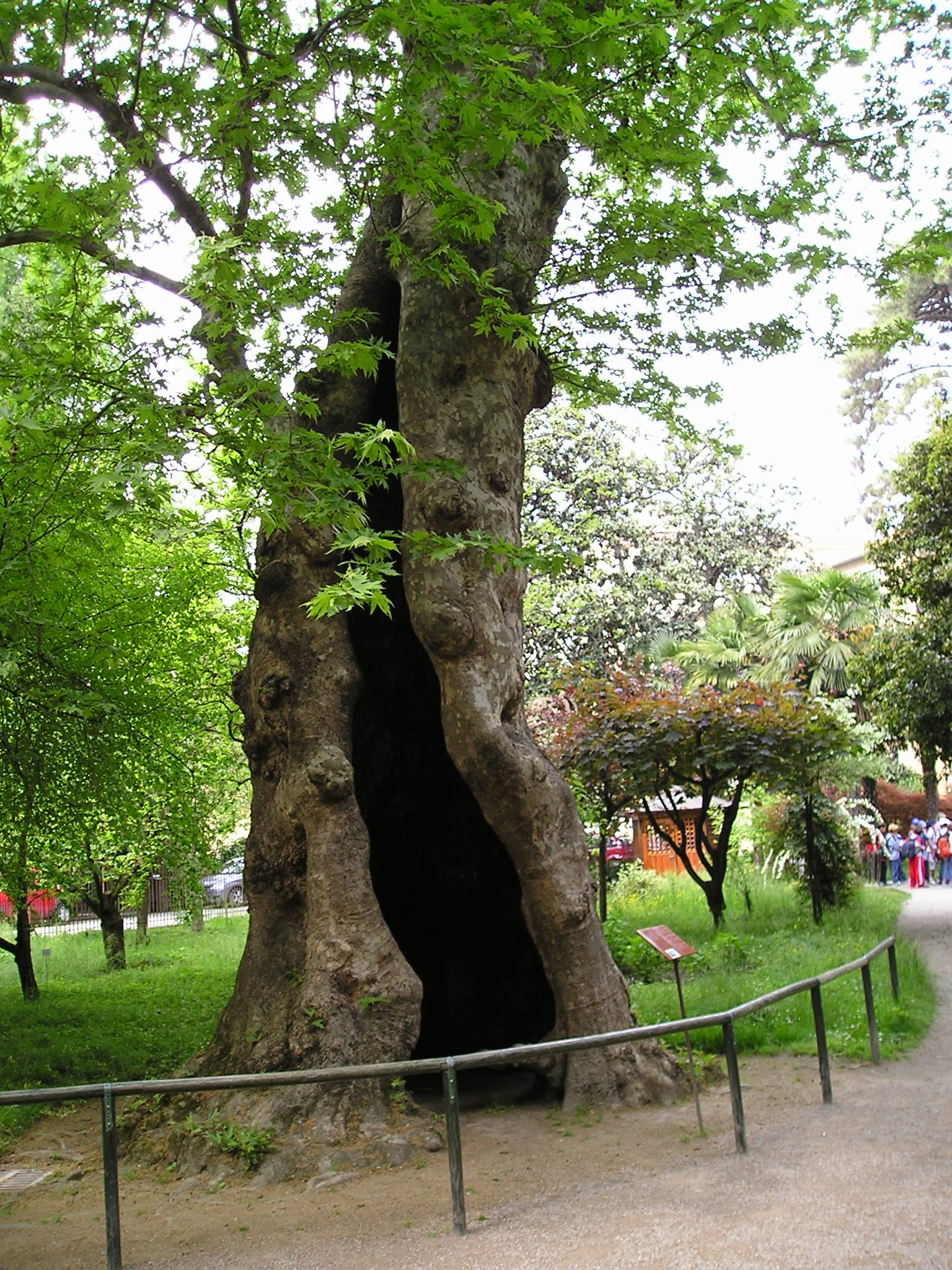
Platanus orientalis

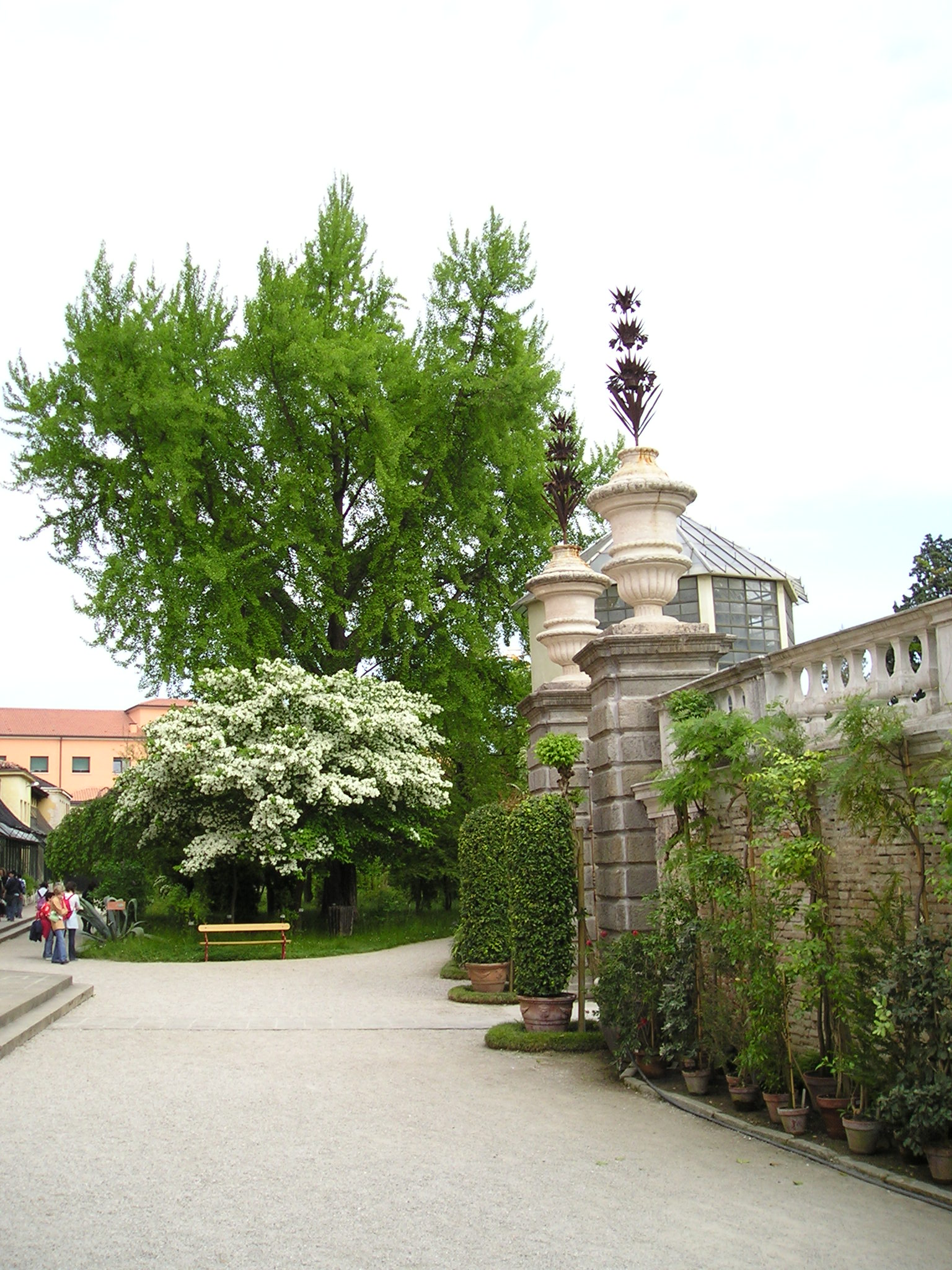
North gate

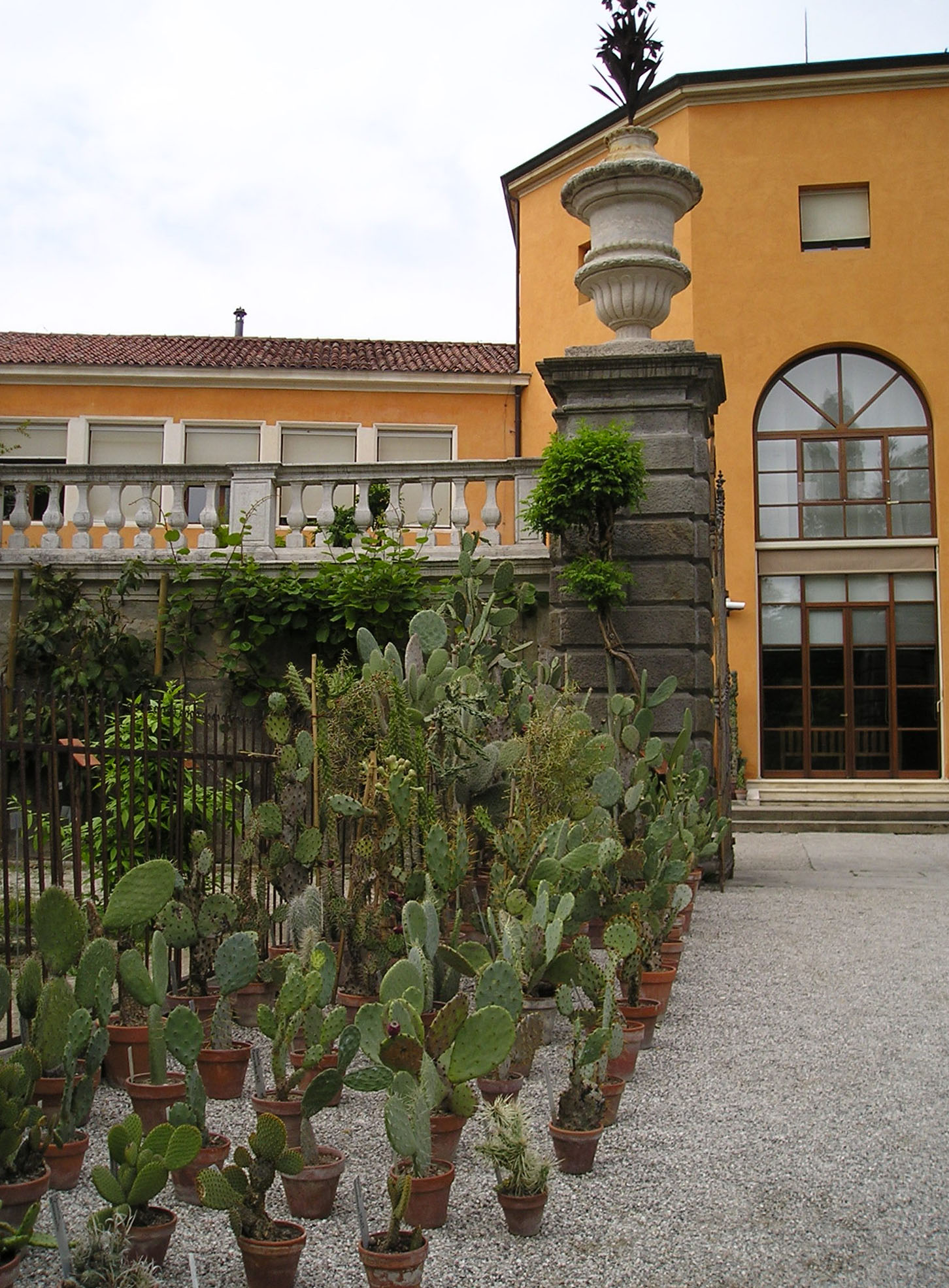
Collezione Opuntia

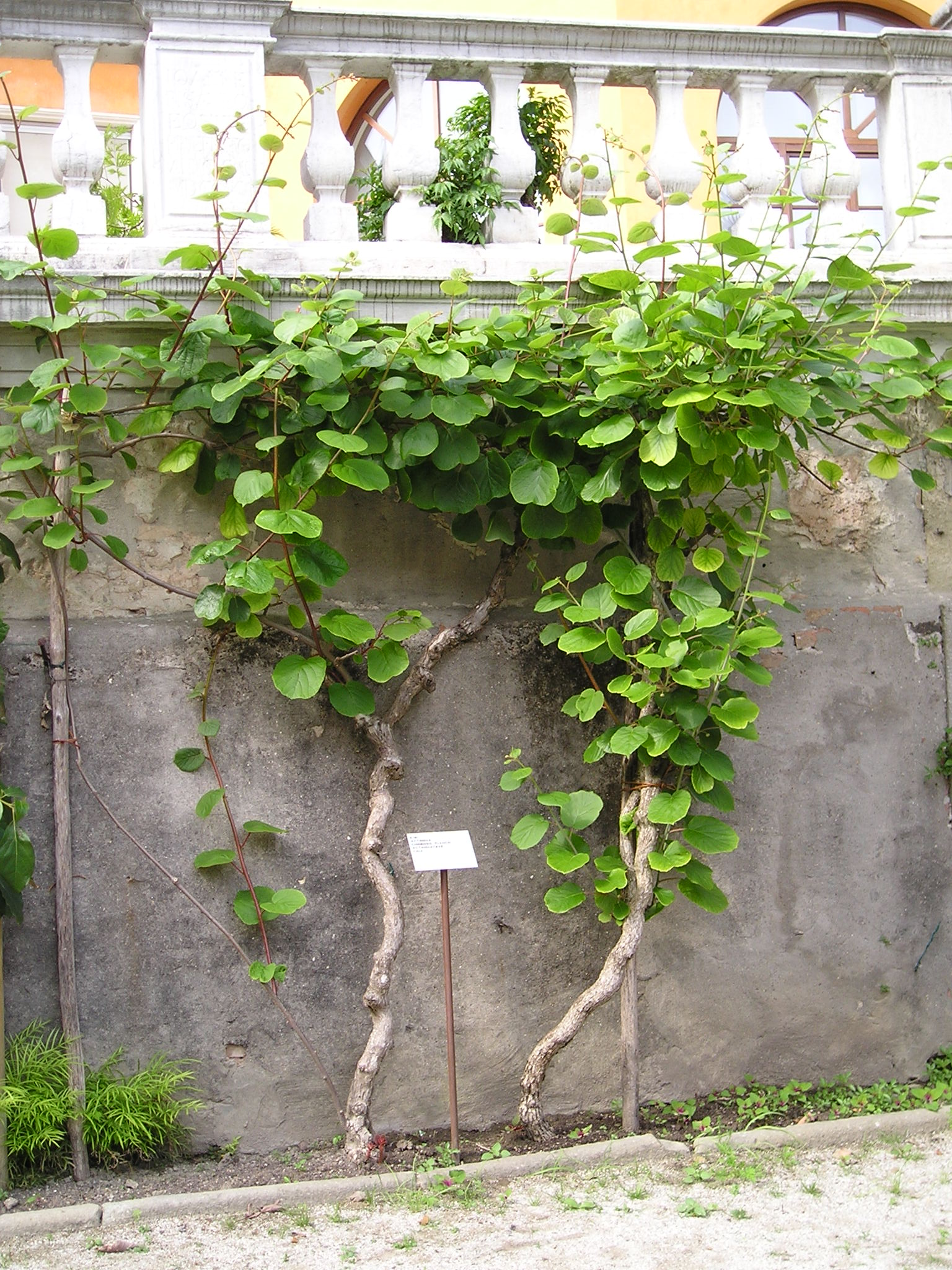
Actinidia chinensis

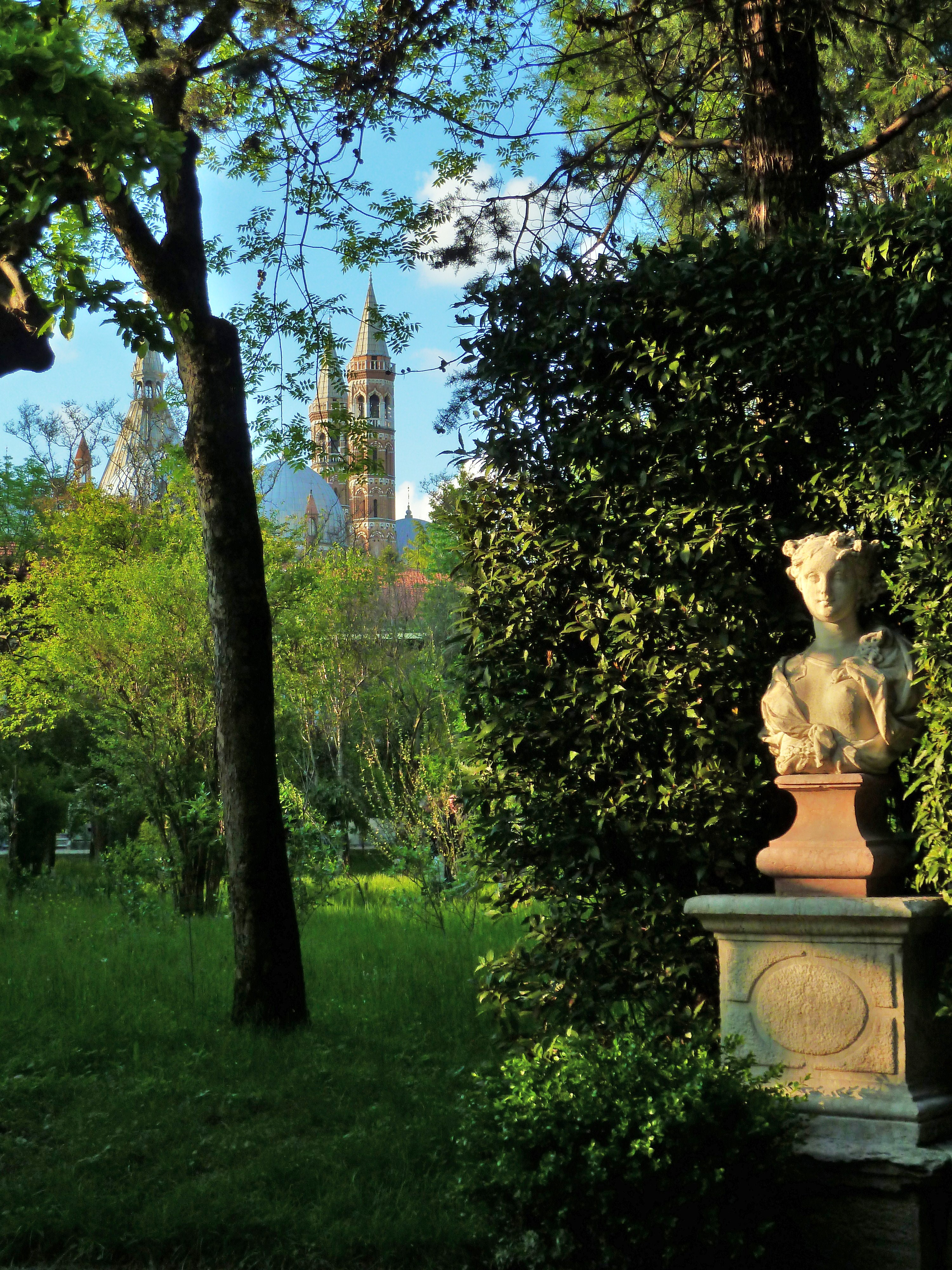
The Basilica of St. Antonius in the background

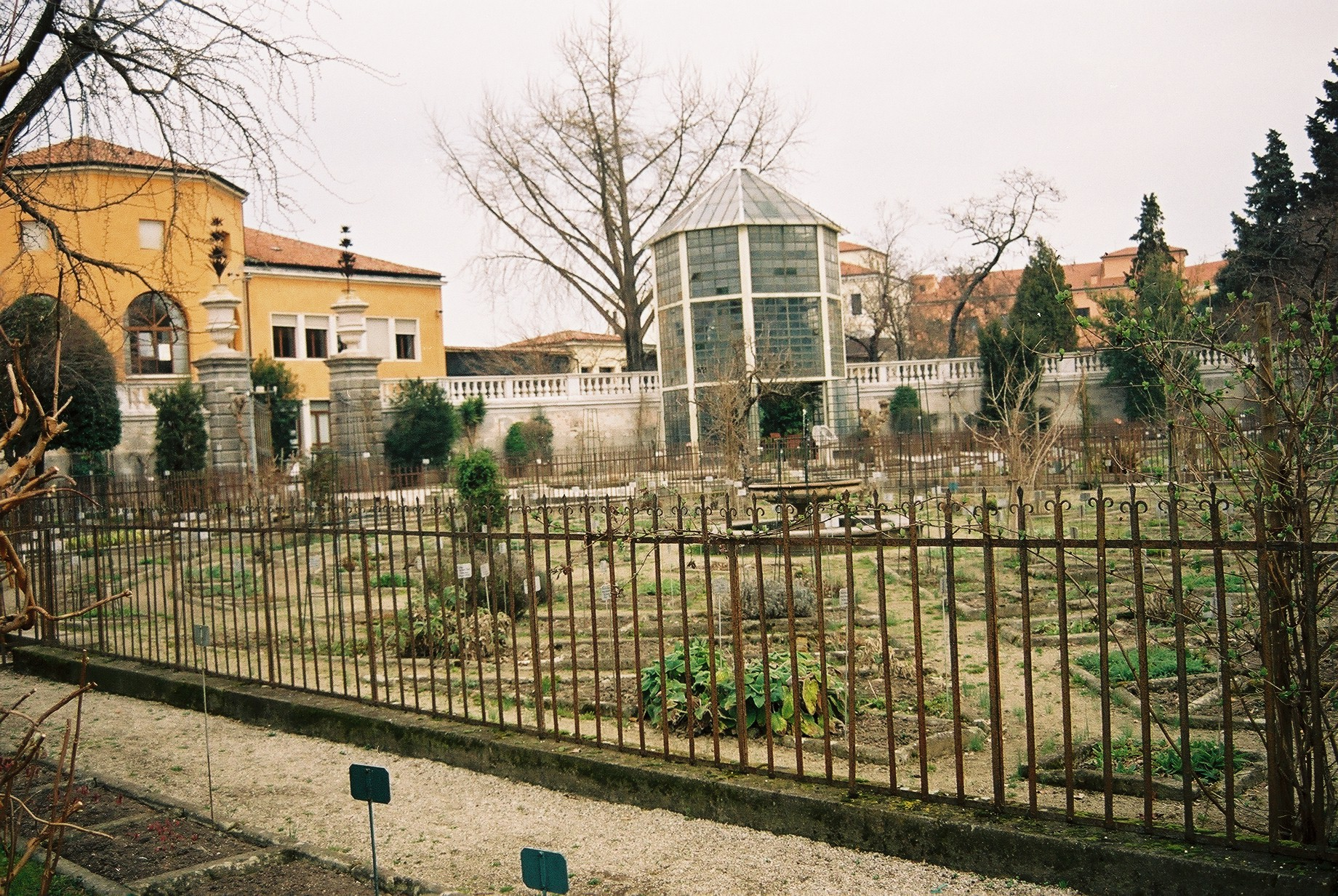
The "Goethe palm" greenhouse

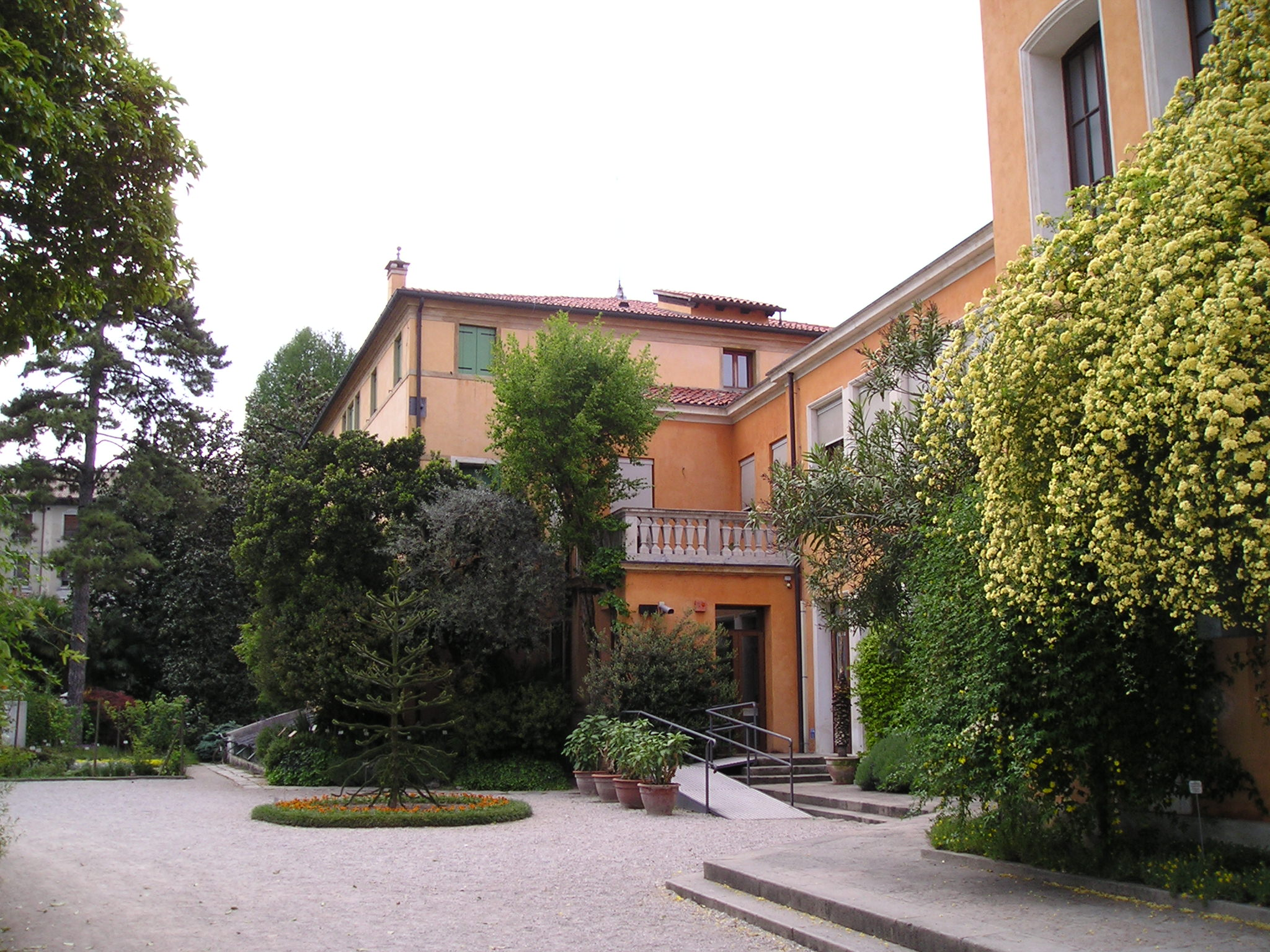
Macchia mediterranea

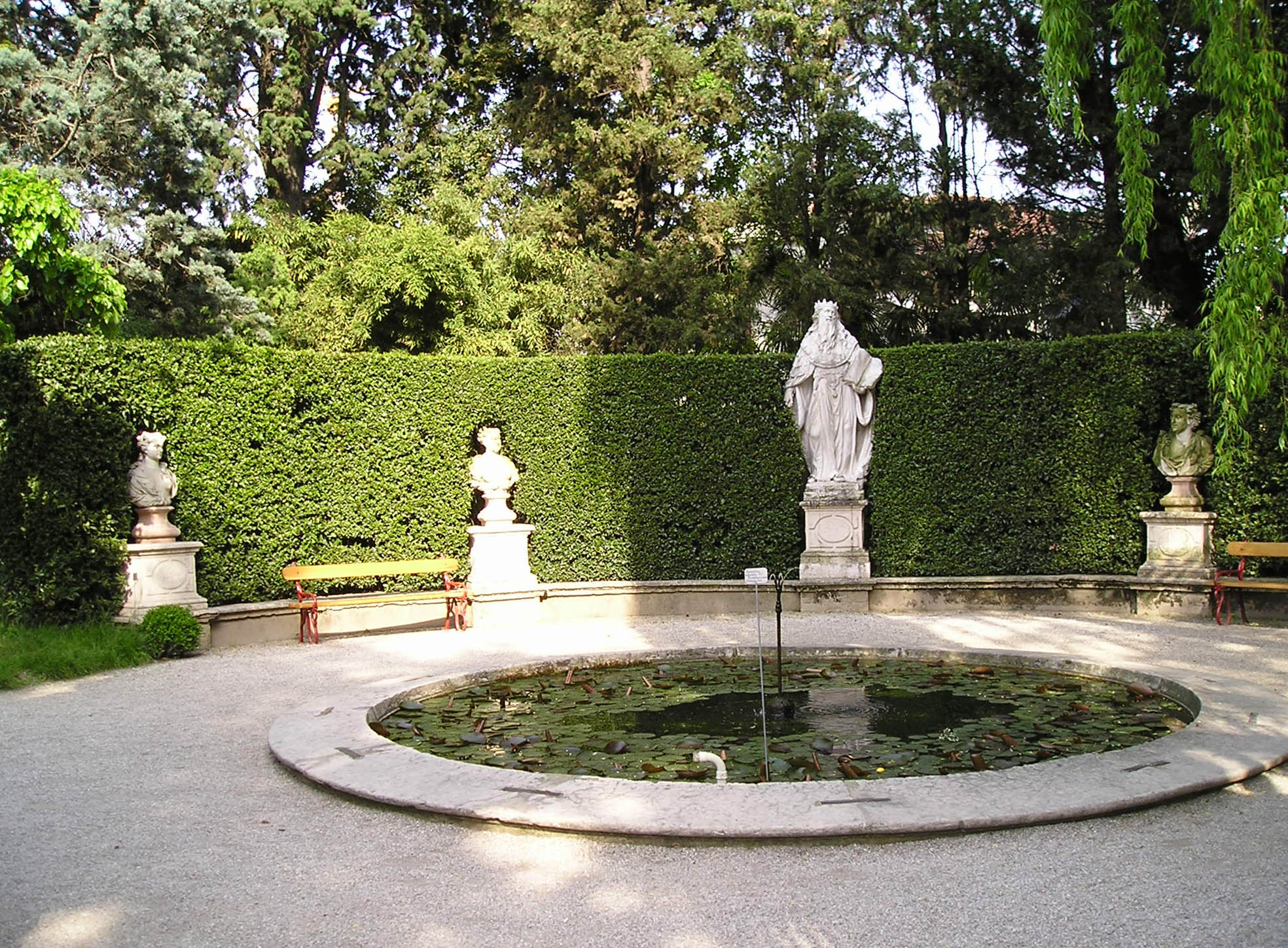
Fountain

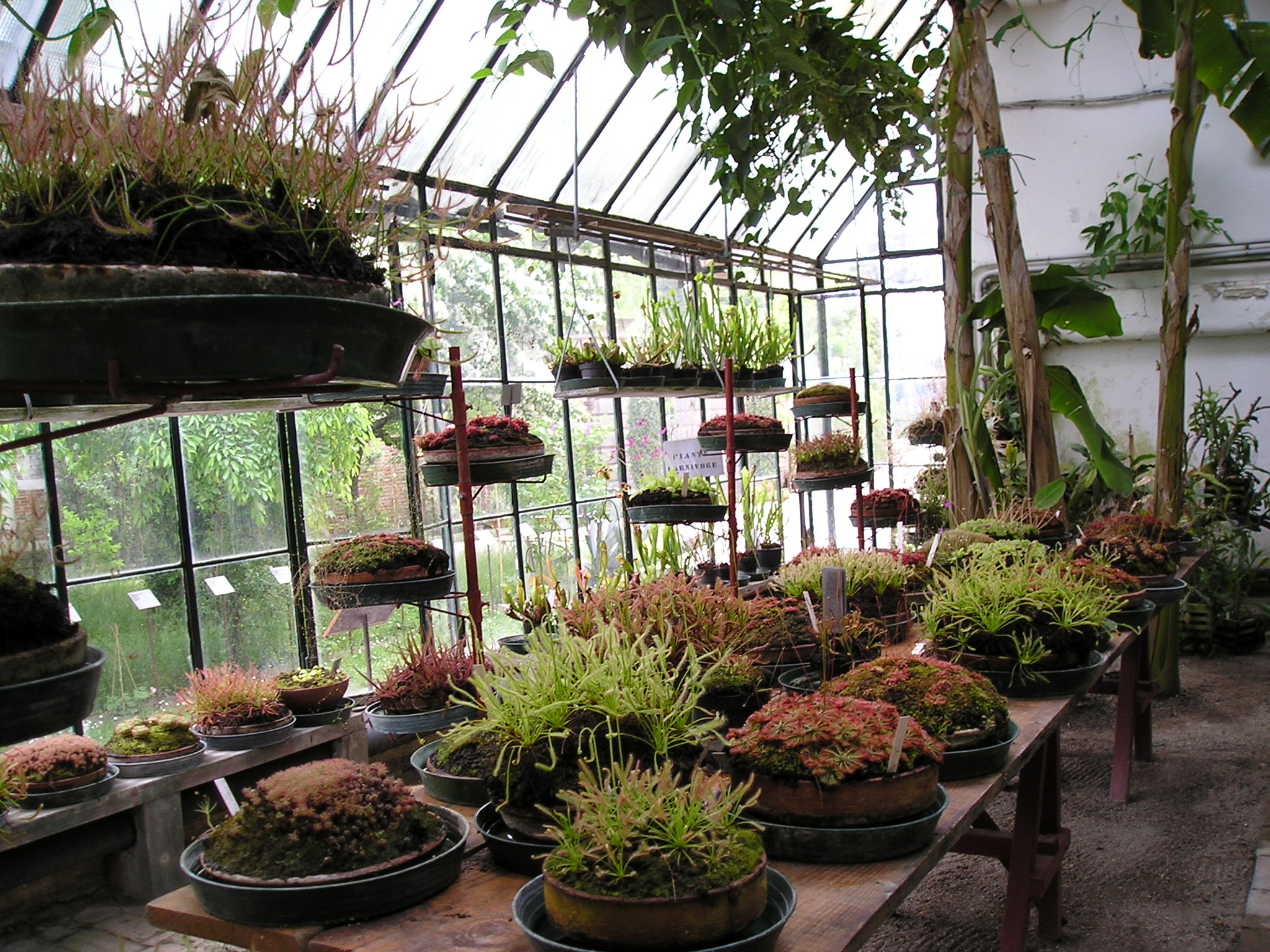
The carnivorous plants greenhouse

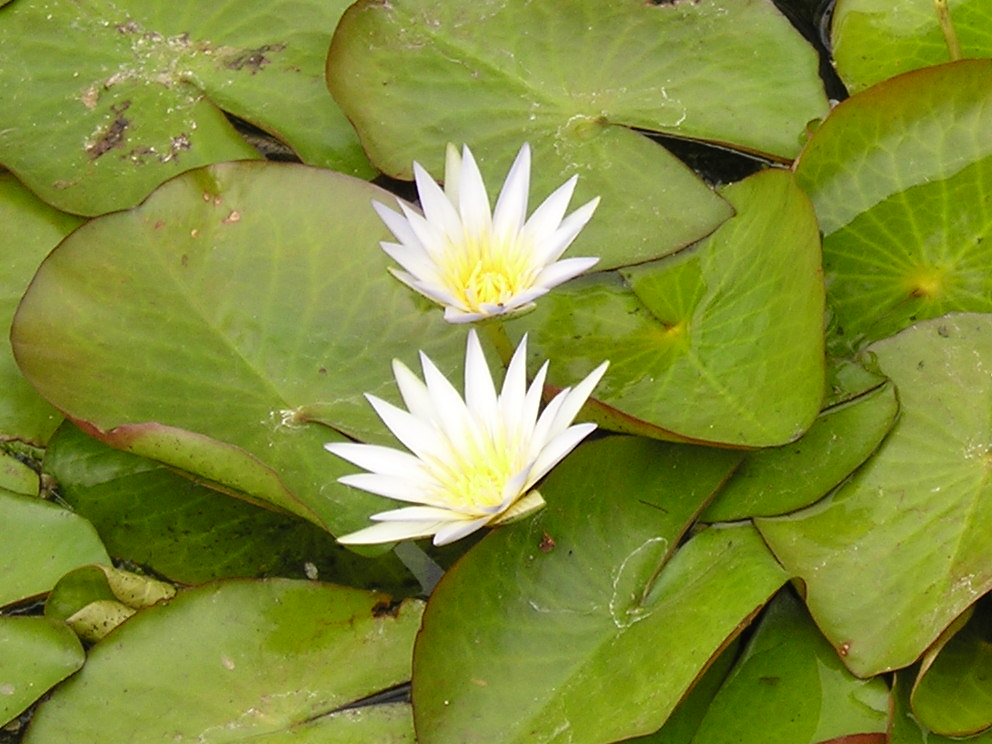
Water lily Nymphaea caerulea

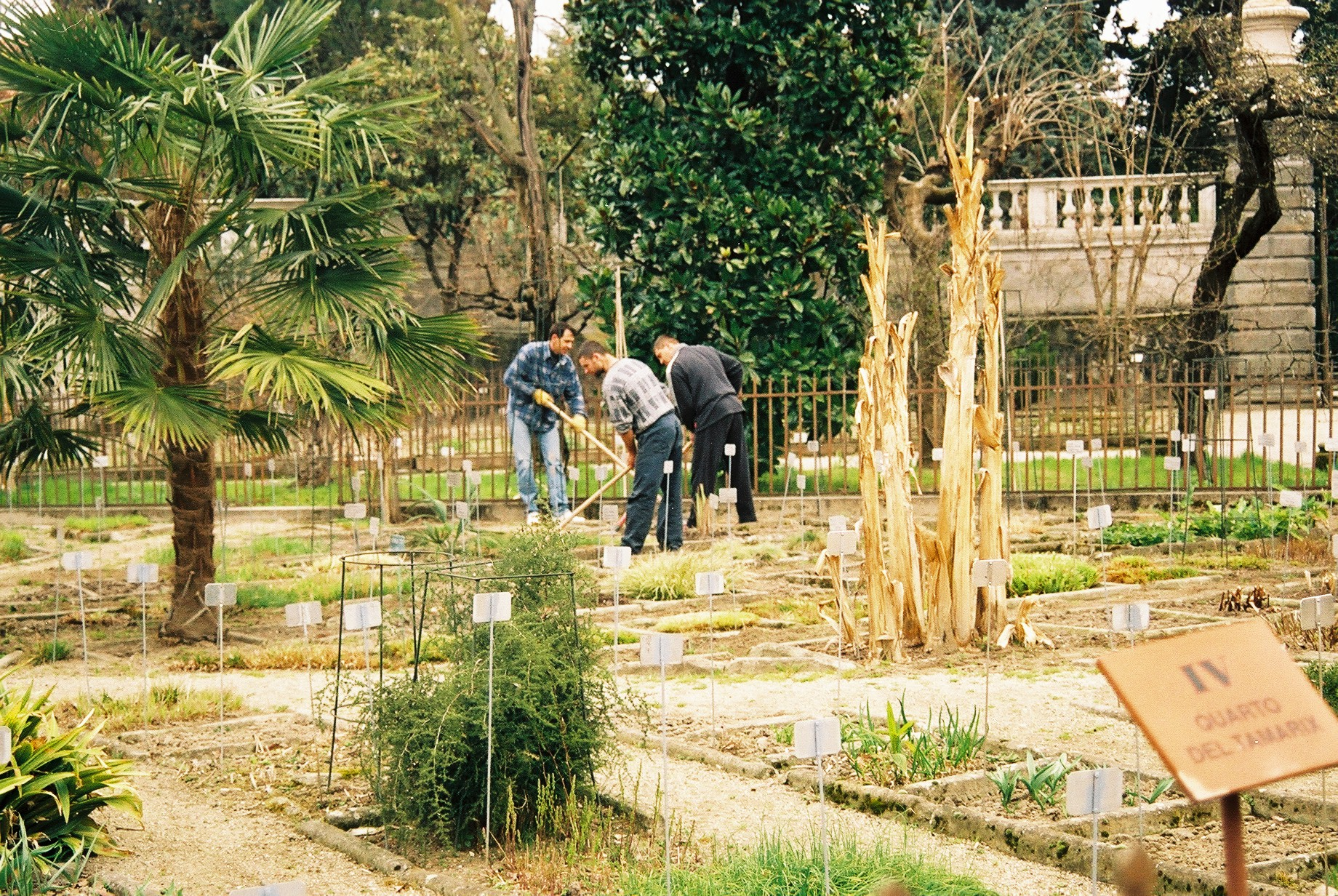
Gardeners working

== See also ==
- List of World Heritage Sites in Italy
- List of the botanical gardens in Italy

== Sources ==
- Minelli, A. The botanical garden of Padova (1545–1995), Marsilio, 1988. ISBN 88-317-6977-4
- G. Buffa, F. Bracco, N. Tornadore, Guida all’Orto Botanico di Padova. Quattro percorsi per conoscerne la storia e le piante. Centrooffset, Padova, 1999. ISBN 88-900229-1-4
