= 2015–16 AC ChievoVerona season =

Chievo
2015–16 season
- President: Luca Campedelli
- Manager: Rolando Maran
- Stadium: Stadio Marc'Antonio Bentegodi
- Serie A: 9th
- Coppa Italia: Third round
- Top goalscorer: League: Alberto Paloschi (8); All: Alberto Paloschi (8)
- Highest home attendance: 25,000 vs Juventus (31 January 2016, Serie A)
- Lowest home attendance: 1,500 vs Salernitana (17 August 2015, Coppa Italia)
- Average home league attendance: 11,761
Home colours	Away colours	Third colours

The 2015–16 season was Associazione Calcio ChievoVerona's 9th consecutive season in Serie A. The club competed in Serie A, finishing 9th, and in the Coppa Italia, where Chievo was eliminated in the third round by Salernitana (0-1 after extra time).

ChievoVerona made a good start to the season, taking 10 points from the first five games, and ultimately ended up fluctuating in mid-table throughout most of the season. The 9th-place finish was the club's best placement since 2006 and would be their best result in the club's 11-year stay in Serie A between 2008 and 2019.

Valter Birsa, whose loan became permanent, and Simone Pepe were amongst the club's signings before the start of the year.

== Players ==
=== Squad information ===
In italics players who left the club during the season. Note: Flags indicate national team as defined under FIFA eligibility rules; some limited exceptions apply. Players may hold more than one non-FIFA nationality.

No.	Pos.	Nation	Player
1	GK	ARG	Albano Bizzarri
2	DF	ITA	Raffaele Pucino
2	DF	ARG	Nicolás Spolli
3	DF	ITA	Dario Dainelli
4	MF	ITA	Nicola Rigoni
5	DF	ITA	Alessandro Gamberini
6	MF	ITA	Giampiero Pinzi
7	MF	ITA	Simone Pepe
8	MF	SRB	Ivan Radovanović
9	FW	COL	Jhon Fredy Miranda
10	MF	DEN	Anders Christiansen
10	MF	SRB	Nikola Ninković
11	DF	ITA	Federico Mattiello (on loan from Juventus)
12	DF	SVN	Boštjan Cesar
13	MF	ARG	Mariano Izco
14	MF	ALB	Armando Vajushi
16	FW	GAM	Ali Sowe
18	DF	ITA	Massimo Gobbi

No.	Pos.	Nation	Player
19	MF	ARG	Lucas Castro
20	DF	ITA	Gennaro Sardo
21	DF	FRA	Nicolas Frey (vice-captain)
23	MF	SVN	Valter Birsa
24	MF	SEN	Maodo Mbaye
29	DF	ITA	Fabrizio Cacciatore
31	FW	ITA	Sergio Pellissier (captain)
32	GK	ITA	Walter Bressan
34	DF	ITA	Cristiano Biraghi
36	DF	ITA	Filippo Costa
40	MF	COD	Paul-José M'Poku
43	FW	ITA	Alberto Paloschi
45	FW	ITA	Roberto Inglese
56	MF	FIN	Përparim Hetemaj
69	FW	ITA	Riccardo Meggiorini
83	FW	ITA	Antonio Floro Flores
90	GK	ITA	Andrea Seculin

== Transfers ==
=== In ===
Date	Pos.	Player	Age	Moving from	Fee	Notes	Source
11 June 2015	DF	(Bosnia and Herzegovina) Ervin Zukanović	28	(Belgium) Gent			
29 June 2015	FW	(Slovenia) Damir Bartulovič	19	(Italy) Vicenza			
29 June 2015	MF	(Argentina) Lucas Castro	26	(Italy) Catania			
30 June 2015	MF	(Italy) Massimo Gobbi	34	(Italy) Parma	Free		
30 June 2015	GK	(Italy) Matteo Brunelli	21	(Italy) Carpi	Undisclosed		
1 July 2015	DF	(Italy) Davide Savi	19	(Italy) Atalanta			
3 July 2015	MF	(Slovenia) Valter Birsa	28	(Italy) Milan			
23 July 2015	GK	(Italy) Walter Bressan	34	(Italy) Cesena	Free		
11 August 2015	FW	(Italy) Simone Pepe	31	(Italy) Juventus	Free		
31 August 2015	MF	(Italy) Giampiero Pinzi	34	(Italy) Udinese			
16 January 2016	DF	(Italy) Filippo Costa	20	(England) AFC Bournemouth	Loan return		
22 January 2016	DF	(Argentina) Nicolás Spolli	32	(Italy) Carpi	Free		
29 January 2016	MF	(Netherlands) Fabian Sporkslede	22	Unattached			
1 February 2016	MF	(Serbia) Nikola Ninković	21	(Serbia) Partizan			

==== Loans in ====
Date	Pos.	Player	Age	Moving from	Fee	Notes	Source
3 July 2015	DF	(Italy) Federico Mattiello	19	(Italy) Juventus	Loan		
13 July 2015	FW	(Democratic Republic of the Congo) Paul-José M'Poku	23	(Belgium) Standard Liège	Loan		
17 July 2015	DF	(Italy) Fabrizio Cacciatore	28	(Italy) Sampdoria	Loan		
1 February 2016	FW	(Italy) Antonio Floro Flores	32	(Italy) Sassuolo	Loan		

=== Out ===
Date	Pos.	Player	Age	Moving to	Fee	Notes	Source
24 June 2015	MF	(Italy) Juri Cisotti	22	(Italy) Spezia			
24 June 2015	FW	(Brazil) Diego Farias	25	(Italy) Cagliari			
29 June 2015	DF	(Italy) Kevin Magri	19	(Italy) Vicenza			
1 July 2015	FW	(Albania) Isnik Alimi	21	(Italy) Atalanta			
2 July 2015	GK	(Italy) Christian Puggioni	34	(Italy) Sampdoria	Free		
13 July 2015	MF	(France) Thomas Mangani	28	(France) Angers			
16 July 2015	FW	(Slovenia) Dejan Lazarević	25	(Turkey) Antalyaspor			
21 July 2015	DF	(England) Myles Anderson	25	(Italy) L'Aquila			
25 August 2015	MF	(Romania) Adrian Stoian	24	(Italy) Crotone	Free		
4 January 2016	MF	(Italy) Alessandro Sbaffo	25	(Italy) Avellino			
26 January 2016	MF	(Denmark) Anders Christiansen	25	(Sweden) Malmö FF			
29 January 2016	FW	(Italy) Alberto Paloschi	26	(Wales) Swansea City			

==== Loans out ====
Date	Pos.	Player	Age	Moving to	Fee	Notes	Source
6 July 2015	DF	(Italy) Alessandro Bassoli	25	(Italy) Südtirol	Loan		
6 July 2015	GK	(Italy) Simone Moschin	19	(Italy) Renate	Loan		
6 July 2015	DF	(Italy) Matteo Solini	22	(Italy) Renate	Loan		
10 July 2015	DF	(Italy) Gianni Manfrin	21	(Italy) Alessandria	2-year loan		
11 July 2015	MF	(Poland) Tomasz Kupisz	25	(Italy) Brescia	Loan		
13 July 2015	DF	(Italy) Marco Calderoni	26	(Italy) Latina	Loan		
13 July 2015	DF	(Italy) Filippo Costa	20	(England) AFC Bournemouth	Loan		
17 July 2015	MF	(Bulgaria) Radoslav Kirilov	23	(Italy) Südtirol	Loan		
17 July 2015	DF	(Bosnia and Herzegovina) Ervin Zukanović	28	(Italy) Sampdoria	Loan		
17 July 2015	GK	(Italy) Matteo Brunelli	21	(Italy) Pisa	Loan		
18 July 2015	MF	(Italy) Mario Gargiulo	19	(Italy) Bassano	Loan		
23 July 2015	DF	(Senegal) Ansoumana Sané	19	(Italy) Pontedera	Loan		
23 July 2015	GK	(Italy) Ivan Provedel	21	(Italy) Modena	Loan		
23 July 2015	MF	(Italy) Lorenzo Marchionni	20	(Italy) Modena	Loan		
24 July 2015	MF	(Brazil) Victor da Silva	20	(Italy) Teramo	Loan		
4 August 2015	MF	(Italy) Alessio Sestu	31	(Italy) Virtus Entella	Loan		
6 August 2015	FW	(Italy) Caleb Ekuban	21	(Italy) Renate	Loan		
6 August 2015	FW	(France) Arthur Yamga	19	(Italy) Siena	Loan		
19 August 2015	MF	(Albania) Armando Vajushi	23	(Italy) Livorno	Loan		
19 August 2015	DF	(Brazil) Edimar Fraga	29	(Portugal) Rio Ave	Loan		
21 August 2015	MF	(Ghana) Isaac Ntow	21	(Italy) Como	Loan		
28 August 2015	DF	(Italy) Raffaele Pucino	24	(Italy) Lanciano	Loan		
31 August 2015	MF	(Senegal) Maodo Mbaye	19	(Italy) Latina	Loan		
31 August 2015	FW	(The Gambia) Ali Sowe	21	(Italy) Modena	Loan		
31 August 2015	MF	(Italy) Alessandro Sbaffo	25	(Italy) Como	Loan		
4 January 2016	DF	(Italy) Raffaele Pucino	24	(Italy) Avellino	Loan		
21 January 2016	MF	(Italy) Nicola Bellomo	24	(Italy) Vicenza	18-month loan		
23 January 2016	FW	(The Gambia) Ali Sowe	21	(Italy) Lecce	Loan		
1 February 2016	FW	(Brazil) Victor da Silva	21	(Croatia) Istra 1961	Loan		
1 February 2016	MF	(Netherlands) Fabian Sporkslede	22	(Italy) Lupa Castelli Romani	Loan		

== Pre-season and friendlies ==
12 July 2015 Friendly	Chievo (Italy)	6–0	(Italy) Top 22 Rappresentativa Dilettanti	San Zeno di Montagna
17:30 CEST (UTC+02:00)	Christiansen 16'; Castro 18', 40'; Meggiorini 27'; Paloschi 72'; Hetemaj 79'	Report		Stadium: Centro Sportivo Naviglio; Referee: Fabrizio Ciamarone

18 July 2015 Friendly	Chievo (Italy)	5–2	(Italy) ArzignanoChiampo	San Zeno di Montagna
17:30 CEST (UTC+02:00)	Dainelli 6'; M'Poku 12'; Sardo 58'; Cesar 72'; Meggiorini 74'	Report	Marchetti 23', 36'	Stadium: Centro Sportivo Naviglio; Referee: Gaetano De Vecchi

19 July 2015 Friendly	Chievo (Italy)	6–1	(Italy) Virtus Verona	San Zeno di Montagna
17:30 CEST (UTC+02:00)	Paloschi 10'; Castro 18'; Christiansen 22'; Nosa 25' (o.g.); Birsa 31', 45'	Report	Cesar Verdun 72'	Stadium: Centro Sportivo Naviglio; Referee: Tiziano Mantovani

24 July 2015 Friendly	Chievo (Italy)	0–0	(Italy) Cittadella	Rovereto
17:30 CEST (UTC+02:00)		Report		Stadium: Stadio Quercia; Referee: Alessandro Prontera

29 July 2015 Friendly	Brescia (Italy)	0–1	(Italy) Chievo	Salò
19:00 CEST (UTC+02:00)		Report	Inglese 71'	Stadium: Stadio Lino Turina; Attendance: 810; Referee: Andrea Gervasoni

1 August 2015 Friendly	Bayer Leverkusen (Germany)	3–1	(Italy) Chievo	Leverkusen
15:30 CEST (UTC+02:00)	Mehmedi 4'; Toprak 40'; Kießling 81'	Report	M'Poku 38'	Stadium: Ulrich-Haberland-Stadion (Amateurstadion); Referee: Benjamin Blaser

5 August 2015 Friendly	Chievo (Italy)	11–0	(Italy) U.S. Sant'Anna D'Alfaedo	Fosse
17:30 CEST (UTC+02:00)	Pellissier 1', 29'; M'Poku 6'; Hetemaj 26'; Christiansen 33'; Inglese 53', 72'; Sardo 77'; Castro 81'; Paloschi 83', 88'	Report		Stadium: Campo Comunale; Referee: Gaetano De Vecchi

8 August 2015 Friendly	Atalanta (Italy)	1–1	(Italy) Chievo	Ponte San Pietro
18:00 CEST (UTC+02:00)	Gómez 2'	Report	Birsa 83'	Stadium: Stadio Matteo Legler; Referee: Andrea Tardino

12 August 2015 Friendly	Vicenza (Italy)	2–1	(Italy) Chievo	Vicenza
20:45 CEST (UTC+02:00)	Giacomelli 50', 88'	Report	Pellissier 20' (pen.)	Stadium: Stadio Romeo Menti; Referee: Leonardo Baracani

5 September 2015 Friendly	Chievo (Italy)	2–1	(Italy) Pavia	Villafranca di Verona
15:30 CEST (UTC+02:00)	Pellissier 37'; Pepe 73'	Report	Anastasia 60'	Stadium: Stadio Comunale; Referee: Andrea Giuseppe Zanonato

8 October 2015 Friendly	Chievo (Italy)	5–0	(Italy) Abano Calcio	Caselle di Sommacampagna
15:00 CEST (UTC+02:00)	Pepe 26'; Castro 54'; Inglese 61'; Pellissier 68'; Paloschi 74'	Report		Stadium: Comunale di Caselle di Sommacampagna; Referee: Fabrizio Ciamarone

29 December 2015 Friendly	Chievo (Italy)	12–1	(Italy) Giorgione Calcio	Bardolino
14:30 CEST (UTC+01:00)	Pellissier 14'; Meggiorini 24', 33'; Inglese 48', 73', 88'; Pepe 59', 70'; Paloschi 62', 85'; Birsa 75'; Cacciatore 90'	Report	Gashi 38'	Stadium: Centro Sportivo Veronello; Referee: Marco Giannini

24 March 2016 Friendly	A.S.D. Villafranca (Italy)	0–5	(Italy) Chievo	Villafranca di Verona
15:00 CEST (UTC+01:00)		Report	Avanzi 10' (o.g.); Pellissier 36'; Inglese 51', 55'; Depaoli 86'	Stadium: Stadio Comunale; Referee: Marco Giannini

== Competitions ==
=== Serie A ===
==== League table ====
Pos	Team	Pld	W	D	L	GF	GA	GD	Pts
7	Milan	38	15	12	11	49	43	+6	57
8	Lazio	38	15	9	14	52	52	0	54
9	Chievo	38	13	11	14	43	45	−2	50
10	Empoli	38	12	10	16	40	49	−9	46 (Note: Empoli ahead of Genoa on head-to-head goal difference; Empoli +1, Genoa –1.)
11	Genoa	38	13	7	18	45	48	−3	46

Source: Serie A, Soccerway
Rules for classification: 1) Points; 2) Head-to-head points; 3) Head-to-head goal difference; 4) Goal difference; 5) Goals scored; 6) Draw.

==== Results summary ====
Overall								Home						Away					
Pld	W	D	L	GF	GA	GD	Pts	W	D	L	GF	GA	GD	W	D	L	GF	GA	GD
38	13	11	14	43	45	−2	50	7	8	4	25	18	+7	6	3	10	18	27	−9

Last updated: 15 May 2016.
Source: Competitive matches

==== Results by round ====
Round	1	2	3	4	5	6	7	8	9	10	11	12	13	14	15	16	17	18	19	20	21	22	23	24	25	26	27	28	29	30	31	32	33	34	35	36	37	38
Ground	A	H	A	H	H	A	H	A	H	A	H	A	A	H	A	H	A	H	A	H	A	H	A	A	H	A	H	A	H	A	H	H	A	H	A	H	A	H
Result	W	W	D	L	W	D	D	L	L	L	D	L	W	L	W	W	L	D	W	D	L	L	L	W	D	L	W	L	D	W	W	W	D	W	L	D	L	D
Position	2	1	2	6	4	7	7	9	11	11	13	14	11	13	11	10	11	12	10	10	10	12	12	10	10	12	10	10	10	9	9	9	9	8	8	9	9	9

Updated to match(es) played on 15 May 2016. Source: Competitive matches
A = Away; H = Home; W = Win; D = Draw; L = Loss

==== Matches ====
23 August 2015 1	Empoli	1–3	Chievo	Empoli
20:45 CEST (UTC+02:00)	Saponara 7', (yellow card) 65'	Report	Meggiorini (yellow card) 53', (goal) 55'; Birsa 60'; Paloschi 64'; Rigoni (yellow card) 80'	Stadium: Stadio Carlo Castellani; Attendance: 7,309; Referee: Maurizio Mariani

30 August 2015 2	Chievo	4–0	Lazio	Verona
20:45 CEST (UTC+02:00)	Meggiorini 12'; Paloschi 30', 68'; Birsa 45'	Report	Cataldi (yellow card) 73'	Stadium: Stadio Marc'Antonio Bentegodi; Attendance: 10,000; Referee: Marco Di Bello

12 September 2015 3	Juventus	1–1	Chievo	Turin
20:45 CEST (UTC+02:00)	Hernanes (yellow card) 35'; Alex Sandro (yellow card) 49'; Dybala 83' (pen.); Cuadrado (yellow card) 90+1'	Report	Hetemaj 5'; Castro (yellow card) 21'; Birsa (yellow card) 50'; Cesar (yellow card) 78'; Pepe (yellow card) 81'; Bizzarri (yellow card) 90+2'	Stadium: Juventus Stadium; Attendance: 28,899; Referee: Marco Guida

20 September 2015 4	Chievo	0–1	Internazionale	Verona
12:30 CEST (UTC+02:00)	Rigoni (yellow card) 37'; Meggiorini (yellow card) 40'; M'Poku (yellow card) 90+4'	Report	Guarín (yellow card) 27'; Icardi 42'	Stadium: Stadio Marc'Antonio Bentegodi; Attendance: 20,000; Referee: Paolo Tagliavento

23 September 2015 5	Chievo	1–0	Torino	Verona
20:45 CEST (UTC+02:00)	Pinzi (yellow card) 16'; Castro 75', (yellow card) 82'; Gobbi (yellow card) 85'	Report	Peres (yellow card) 15'; Acquah (yellow card) 72'; Bovo (yellow card) 88'	Stadium: Stadio Marc'Antonio Bentegodi; Attendance: 10,000; Referee: Domenico Celi

27 September 2015 6	Sassuolo	1–1	Chievo	Reggio Emilia
15:00 CEST (UTC+02:00)	Defrel 3'; Peluso (yellow card) 12'; Magnanelli (yellow card) 56'; Berardi (yellow card) 64'	Report	Pepe 24'; Hetemaj (yellow card) 43'	Stadium: Mapei Stadium – Città del Tricolore; Attendance: 8,220; Referee: Michael Fabbri

3 October 2015 7	Chievo	1–1	Hellas Verona	Verona
20:45 CEST (UTC+02:00)	Cesar (yellow card) 58'; Meggiorini (yellow card) 76'; Castro 83'	Report	Pisano 70'	Stadium: Stadio Marc'Antonio Bentegodi; Attendance: 20,000; Referee: Daniele Doveri

18 October 2015 8	Genoa	3–2	Chievo	Genoa
15:00 CEST (UTC+02:00)	Pavoletti 13'; Gakpé 17'; Džemaili (yellow card) 50' (yellow-red card) 54'; De Maio (yellow card) 56'; Tachtsidis 90+3', (yellow card) 90+4'	Report	Paloschi 1'; Castro (yellow card) 33'; Pellissier 77'; Pepe (yellow card) 79'	Stadium: Stadio Luigi Ferraris; Attendance: 19,207; Referee: Paolo Mazzoleni

25 October 2015 9	Chievo	0–1	Napoli	Verona
20:45 CET (UTC+01:00)	Meggiorini (yellow card) 54'	Report	Koulibaly (yellow card) 46'; Higuaín 59'; Mertens (yellow card) 89'	Stadium: Stadio Marc'Antonio Bentegodi; Attendance: 12,000; Referee: Davide Massa

28 October 2015 10	Milan	1–0	Chievo	Milan
20:45 CET (UTC+01:00)	Antonelli 53'	Report	Pinzi (yellow card) 50'; Cesar (yellow card) 58'	Stadium: San Siro; Attendance: 25,523; Referee: Gianpaolo Calvarese

2 November 2015 11	Chievo	1–1	Sampdoria	Verona
19:00 CET (UTC+01:00)	Inglese 34'; Dainelli (yellow card) 41'; Hetemaj (yellow card) 59'; Meggiorini (yellow card) 69'	Report	Éder 8'; Silvestre (yellow card) 38'; Cassani (yellow card) 73'	Stadium: Stadio Marc'Antonio Bentegodi; Attendance: 9,200; Referee: Claudio Gavillucci

8 November 2015 12	Palermo	1–0	Chievo	Palermo
15:00 CET (UTC+01:00)	Daprelà (yellow card) 42'; Gilardino 71', (yellow card) 71'; Vázquez (yellow card) 84'; Goldaniga (yellow card) 90+3'	Report	Radovanović (yellow card) 25'; Cesar (yellow card) 37'; Gobbi (yellow card) 63'	Stadium: Stadio Renzo Barbera; Attendance: 14,176; Referee: Maurizio Mariani

22 November 2015 13	Carpi	1–2	Chievo	Modena
15:00 CET (UTC+01:00)	Lollo (yellow card) 12'; Gamberini 61' (o.g.); Gagliolo (yellow card) 66'; Silva (yellow card) 77'; Zaccardo (yellow card) 84'	Report	Inglese 8', (yellow card) 56'; Meggiorini 14'; Birsa (yellow card) 17'; Radovanović (yellow card) 90+3'	Stadium: Stadio Alberto Braglia; Attendance: 7,033; Referee: Fabio Maresca

29 November 2015 14	Chievo	2–3	Udinese	Verona
15:00 CET (UTC+01:00)	Paloschi 26'; Meggiorini (yellow card) 29'; Frey (yellow card) 33'; Castro (yellow card) 45+1'; Cesar (yellow card) 54'; Inglese 72'; Rigoni (yellow card) 90+1'	Report	Iturra (yellow card) 23'; Frey 43' (o.g.); Théréau 46', 81'; Danilo (yellow card) 53'	Stadium: Stadio Marc'Antonio Bentegodi; Attendance: 9,500; Referee: Andrea Gervasoni

6 December 2015 15	Frosinone	0–2	Chievo	Frosinone
15:00 CET (UTC+01:00)	Gori (yellow card) 22'; Dionisi (yellow card) 27'; Diakité (yellow card) 88'	Report	Rigoni (yellow card) 16'; Paloschi (yellow card) 33', (goal) 90' (pen.); Dainelli (yellow card) 46'; Cacciatore (yellow card) 83'; Pepe (yellow card) 90+1' (yellow-red card) 90+2'; Meggioni 90+3'	Stadium: Stadio Matusa; Attendance: 6,484; Referee: Gianluca Rocchi

13 December 2015 16	Chievo	1–0	Atalanta	Verona
15:00 CET (UTC+01:00)	Dainelli (yellow card) 21'; Radovanović (yellow card) 32'; Hetemaj (yellow card) 36'; Birsa 76'	Report	Raimondi (yellow card) 37'; Grassi (yellow card) 47'; Cherubin (yellow card) 66' (red card); Kurtić (yellow card) 90' (yellow-red card) 90+1'	Stadium: Stadio Marc'Antonio Bentegodi; Attendance: 9,000; Referee: Fabrizio Pasqua

20 December 2015 17	Fiorentina	2–0	Chievo	Florence
15:00 CET (UTC+01:00)	Kalinić 20'; Iličič 32'; Bernardeschi (yellow card) 70'	Report	Gamberini (yellow card) 71'; Inglese (yellow card) 90+4'	Stadium: Stadio Artemio Franchi; Attendance: 25,156; Referee: Paolo Tagliavento

6 January 2016 18	Chievo	3–3	Roma	Verona
15:00 CET (UTC+01:00)	Castro (yellow card) 28'; Paloschi 44'; Hetemaj (yellow card) 53'; Cacciatore (yellow card) 56'; Dainelli 58'; Pepe 86'	Report	Sadiq 7'; Digne (yellow card) 22'; Florenzi 37'; Falque 71'; Di Livio (yellow card) 88'	Stadium: Stadio Marc'Antonio Bentegodi; Attendance: 15,000; Referee: Massimiliano Irrati

10 January 2016 19	Bologna	0–1	Chievo	Bologna
15:00 CET (UTC+01:00)	Destro (yellow card) 86'; Oikonomou (yellow card) 90+2'	Report	Frey (yellow card) 37'; Pepe 79'; Cacciatore (yellow card) 87'	Stadium: Stadio Renato Dall'Ara; Attendance: 15,818; Referee: Claudio Gavillucci

17 January 2016 20	Chievo	1–1	Empoli	Verona
15:00 CET (UTC+01:00)	Paloschi 7'; Birsa (yellow card) 11'; Cesar (yellow card) 80'; Pinzi (yellow card) 90+2'	Report	Krunić (yellow card) 23'; Barba (yellow card) 41'; Tonelli 47'; Paredes (yellow card) 53'	Stadium: Stadio Marc'Antonio Bentegodi; Attendance: 8,000; Referee: Rosario Abisso

24 January 2016 21	Lazio	4–1	Chievo	Rome
15:00 CET (UTC+01:00)	Lulić (yellow card) 37'; Candreva 66' (pen.), 81'; Cataldi 72', (yellow card) 73'; Radu (red card) 82'; Keita 90+6'	Report	Cesar 5', (yellow card) 22' (yellow-red card) 47'	Stadium: Stadio Olimpico; Attendance: 17,118; Referee: Gianpaolo Calvarese

31 January 2016 22	Chievo	0–4	Juventus	Verona
12:30 CET (UTC+01:00)	Radovanović (yellow card) 9'; Sardo (yellow card) 54'; Pinzi (yellow card) 85'	Report	Morata 6', 40'; Alex Sandro (yellow card) 20', (goal) 61'; Pogba 67'; Hernanes (yellow card) 84'	Stadium: Stadio Marc'Antonio Bentegodi; Attendance: 25,000; Referee: Daniele Doveri

3 February 2016 23	Internazionale	1–0	Chievo	Milan
20:45 CET (UTC+01:00)	Icardi 48'; Éder (yellow card) 53'; Miranda (yellow card) 59'; Nagatomo (yellow card) 74'	Report	Rigoni (yellow card) 5'; Pellissier (yellow card) 30'; Spolli (yellow card) 71'; Inglese (yellow card) 72'; Castro (yellow card) 75'	Stadium: San Siro; Attendance: 31,494; Referee: Paolo Valeri

7 February 2016 24	Torino	1–2	Chievo	Turin
15:00 CET (UTC+01:00)	Benassi 19', (yellow card) 45'; Immobile (yellow card) 25'; Gazzi (yellow card) 87'	Report	Gobbi (yellow card) 11'; Dainelli (yellow card) 27'; Peres 34' (o.g.); Birsa 72' (pen.); Floro Flores (yellow card) 90+2'	Stadium: Stadio Olimpico di Torino; Attendance: 14,327; Referee: Gianluca Rocchi

13 February 2016 25	Chievo	1–1	Sassuolo	Verona
18:00 CET (UTC+01:00)	Rigoni (yellow card) 23'; Radovanović (yellow card) 25'; Birsa (yellow card) 25', (goal) 29' (pen.)	Report	Peluso (yellow card) 28'; Sansone 30'; Missiroli (yellow card) 59'	Stadium: Stadio Marc'Antonio Bentegodi; Attendance: 8,000; Referee: Davide Ghersini

20 February 2016 26	Hellas Verona	3–1	Chievo	Verona
18:00 CET (UTC+01:00)	Toni 29'; Pazzini 57'; Moras (yellow card) 59' (yellow-red card) 70'; Wszołek (yellow card) 80'; Ioniță 90+5'	Report	Spolli (yellow card) 29' (yellow-red card) 79'; Frey (yellow card) 40'; Pinzi (yellow card) 45'; Pellissier 71' (pen.); Rigoni (yellow card) 90+3'	Stadium: Stadio Marc'Antonio Bentegodi; Attendance: 22,469; Referee: Marco Guida

28 February 2016 27	Chievo	1–0	Genoa	Verona
15:00 CET (UTC+01:00)	Castro 51'; Radovanović (yellow card) 53'; Gobbi (yellow card) 88'	Report	Džemaili (yellow card) 48'; Ansaldi (yellow card) 62'; De Maio (yellow card) 90+1'	Stadium: Stadio Marc'Antonio Bentegodi; Attendance: 8,000; Referee: Michael Fabbri

6 March 2016 28	Napoli	3–1	Chievo	Naples
15:00 CET (UTC+01:00)	Higuaín 6'; Chiricheș 38'; Callejón 70'	Report	Rigoni 2'; Castro (yellow card) 11'; Cesar (yellow card) 58'; Meggiorini (yellow card) 82'	Stadium: Stadio San Paolo; Attendance: 33,239; Referee: Marco Di Bello

13 March 2016 29	Chievo	0–0	Milan	Verona
12:30 CET (UTC+01:00)	Dainelli (yellow card) 41'; Castro (yellow card) 60'; Cacciatore (yellow card) 84'; Gobbi (yellow card) 90+1'	Report	Ménez (yellow card) 44'; Bonaventura (yellow card) 84'	Stadium: Stadio Marc'Antonio Bentegodi; Attendance: 15,000; Referee: Antonio Damato

20 March 2016 30	Sampdoria	0–1	Chievo	Genoa
15:00 CET (UTC+01:00)	Soriano (yellow card) 31'; Fernando (yellow card) 60'; De Silvestri (yellow card) 63'; Moisander (yellow card) 71'	Report	Meggiorini 24'; Castro (yellow card) 39'; Hetemaj (yellow card) 61'; Bizzarri (yellow card) 89'	Stadium: Stadio Luigi Ferraris; Attendance: 20,754; Referee: Luca Pairetto

3 April 2016 31	Chievo	3–1	Palermo	Verona
15:00 CEST (UTC+02:00)	Cacciatore 6'; Floro Flores (yellow card) 42'; Rigoni 53'; Birsa 74'; Pinzi (yellow card) 90'	Report	Gilardino 28'; Struna (yellow card) 32'; Anđelković (yellow card) 42'; Vázquez (yellow card) 88'	Stadium: Stadio Marc'Antonio Bentegodi; Attendance: 8,000; Referee: Maurizio Mariani

9 April 2016 32	Chievo	1–0	Carpi	Verona
18:00 CEST (UTC+02:00)	Radovanović (yellow card) 22'; Meggiorini (yellow card) 44'; Pellissier 83'	Report	Suagher (yellow card) 20'; Pasciuti (yellow card) 56'; Lollo (yellow card) 28'	Stadium: Stadio Marc'Antonio Bentegodi; Attendance: 8,000; Referee: Michael Fabbri

17 April 2016 33	Udinese	0–0	Chievo	Udine
15:00 CEST (UTC+02:00)	Kuzmanović (yellow card) 11'; Felipe (red card) 77'; Fernandes (yellow card) 83'	Report	Cesar (yellow card) 58'; Cacciatore (yellow card) 59'; Spolli (yellow card) 82'; Meggiorini (red card) 85'	Stadium: Stadio Friuli; Attendance: 15,785; Referee: Claudio Gavillucci

20 April 2016 34	Chievo	5–1	Frosinone	Verona
20:45 CEST (UTC+02:00)	Sardo (yellow card) 15', (goal) 60'; Floro Flores 36'; Pellissier 47' (pen.), 80'; Pinzi (yellow card) 55'; Rigoni 58'	Report	D. Ciofani 5'; M. Ciofani (yellow card) 14'; Ajeti (red card) 17'; Leali (yellow card) 18'; Chibsah (yellow card) 30' (yellow-red card) 52'; Soddimo (yellow card) 63'	Stadium: Stadio Marc'Antonio Bentegodi; Attendance: 8,000; Referee: Carmine Russo

24 April 2016 35	Atalanta	1–0	Chievo	Bergamo
15:00 CEST (UTC+02:00)	Paletta (yellow card) 20'; Stendardo (yellow card) 32'; Borriello 55'; Gómez (red card) 75'; Kurtić (yellow card) 86'	Report	Hetemaj (yellow card) 17'; Spolli (yellow card) 86'	Stadium: Stadio Atleti Azzurri d'Italia; Attendance: 15,914; Referee: Angelo Cervellera

30 April 2016 36	Chievo	0–0	Fiorentina	Verona
20:45 CEST (UTC+02:00)	Gobbi (yellow card) 18'; Cacciatore (yellow card) 37'; Cesar (yellow card) 75'; Pellissier (yellow card) 78'	Report	Zárate (yellow card) 17'; Badelj (yellow card) 57'; Tomović (yellow card) 74'; Matías Fernández (yellow card) 75'	Stadium: Stadio Marc'Antonio Bentegodi; Attendance: 9,000; Referee: Marco Guida

8 May 2016 37	Roma	3–0	Chievo	Rome
12:30 CEST (UTC+02:00)	Nainggolan 18'; Rüdiger 39'; Perotti (yellow card) 78'; Pjanić 85'	Report	Radovanović (yellow card) 12'; Hetemaj (yellow card) 80'; M'Poku (yellow card) 90+1'	Stadium: Stadio Olimpico; Attendance: 55,508; Referee: Domenico Celi

15 May 2016 38	Chievo	0–0	Bologna	Verona
15:00 CEST (UTC+02:00)	Sardo (yellow card) 34'; M'Poku (yellow card) 37'	Report	Giaccherini (yellow card) 45'	Stadium: Stadio Marc'Antonio Bentegodi; Attendance: 8,000; Referee: Riccardo Ros

=== Coppa Italia ===
17 August 2015 Third round	Chievo	0–1 (a.e.t.)	Salernitana	Verona
19:00 CEST (UTC+02:00)	Hetemaj (yellow card) 64'	Report	Pestrin (yellow card) 28'; Franco (yellow card) 33'; Sciaudone (yellow card) 93'; Bovo 120+1'	Stadium: Stadio Marc'Antonio Bentegodi; Attendance: 1,500; Referee: Piero Giacomelli

== Statistics ==
=== Appearances and goals ===
No.	Pos	Nat	Player	Total		Serie A		Coppa Italia	
No.	Pos	Nat	Player	Apps	Goals	Apps	Goals	Apps	Goals
Goalkeepers
1	GK	(Argentina) ARG	Albano Bizzarri	36	0	35	0	1	0
32	GK	(Italy) ITA	Walter Bressan	0	0	0	0	0	0
90	GK	(Italy) ITA	Andrea Seculin	3	0	3	0	0	0
Defenders
2	DF	(Argentina) ARG	Nicolás Spolli	10	0	8+2	0	0	0
3	DF	(Italy) ITA	Dario Dainelli	19	1	15+3	1	1	0
5	DF	(Italy) ITA	Alessandro Gamberini	23	0	22	0	1	0
11	MF	(Italy) ITA	Federico Mattiello	1	0	1	0	0	0
12	DF	(Slovenia) SVN	Boštjan Cesar	32	1	30+1	1	1	0
18	DF	(Italy) ITA	Massimo Gobbi	35	0	31+3	0	1	0
20	DF	(Italy) ITA	Gennaro Sardo	6	1	3+3	1	0	0
21	DF	(France) FRA	Nicolas Frey	20	0	17+2	0	1	0
29	DF	(Italy) ITA	Fabrizio Cacciatore	29	1	25+4	1	0	0
36	DF	(Italy) ITA	Filippo Costa	6	0	0+6	0	0	0
Midfielders
4	MF	(Italy) ITA	Nicola Rigoni	28	2	22+6	2	0	0
6	MF	(Italy) ITA	Giampiero Pinzi	18	0	9+9	0	0	0
7	MF	(Italy) ITA	Simone Pepe	23	3	6+16	3	1	0
8	MF	(Serbia) SRB	Ivan Radovanović	27	0	25+1	0	1	0
10	MF	(Serbia) SRB	Nikola Ninković	1	0	0+1	0	0	0
13	MF	(Argentina) ARG	Mariano Izco	0	0	0	0	0	0
19	MF	(Argentina) ARG	Lucas Castro	35	3	32+2	3	1	0
23	MF	(Slovenia) SVN	Valter Birsa	36	6	32+3	6	1	0
56	MF	(Finland) FIN	Përparim Hetemaj	29	1	26+2	1	1	0
Forwards
31	FW	(Italy) ITA	Sergio Pellissier	20	5	10+9	5	1	0
40	FW	(Democratic Republic of the Congo) COD	Paul-José M'Poku	20	0	6+14	0	0	0
45	FW	(Italy) ITA	Roberto Inglese	25	3	15+10	3	0	0
69	FW	(Italy) ITA	Riccardo Meggiorini	24	5	19+5	5	0	0
83	FW	(Italy) ITA	Antonio Floro Flores	14	1	8+6	1	0	0
Players transferred out during the season
10	MF	(Denmark) DEN	Anders Christiansen	1	0	0	0	1	0
43	FW	(Italy) ITA	Alberto Paloschi	22	8	19+2	8	1	0

Last updated: 15 May 2016
Source: Competitions

=== Goalscorers ===
Rank	No.	Pos	Nat	Name	Serie A	Coppa Italia	Total
1	43	FW	(Italy)	Alberto Paloschi	8	0	8
2	23	MF	(Slovenia)	Valter Birsa	6	0	6
3	31	FW	(Italy)	Sergio Pellissier	5	0	5
3	69	FW	(Italy)	Riccardo Meggiorini	5	0	5
4	4	MF	(Italy)	Nicola Rigoni	3	0	3
4	7	MF	(Italy)	Simone Pepe	3	0	3
4	19	MF	(Argentina)	Lucas Castro	3	0	3
4	45	FW	(Italy)	Roberto Inglese	3	0	3
5	3	DF	(Italy)	Dario Dainelli	1	0	1
5	12	DF	(Slovenia)	Boštjan Cesar	1	0	1
5	20	DF	(Italy)	Gennaro Sardo	1	0	1
5	29	DF	(Italy)	Fabrizio Cacciatore	1	0	1
5	56	MF	(Finland)	Përparim Hetemaj	1	0	1
5	83	FW	(Italy)	Antonio Floro Flores	1	0	1
Own goal					1	0	1
Totals					43	0	43

Last updated: 15 May 2016

=== Clean sheets ===
Rank	No.	Pos	Nat	Name	Serie A	Coppa Italia	Total
1	1	GK	(Argentina)	Albano Bizzarri	11	0	11
2	1	GK	(Italy)	Andrea Seculin	1	0	1
Totals					12	0	12

Last updated: 15 May 2016
