= Brenzone sul Garda =

- Comune
- Comune di Brenzone sul Garda
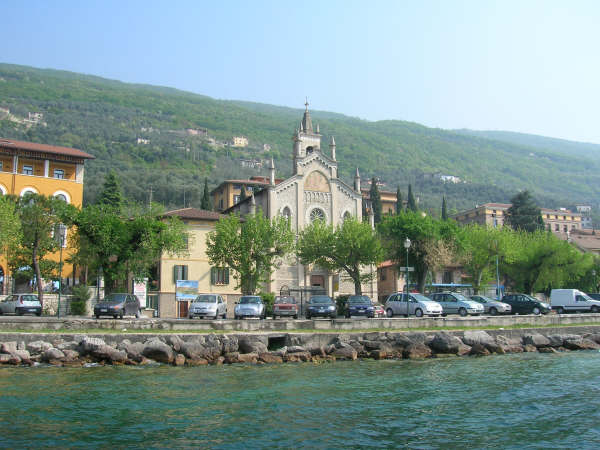
- Brenzone

- Location within Italy Location within Veneto
- Coordinates: 45°42′N 10°46′E
- Country: Italy
- Region: Veneto
- Province: Verona (VR)
- Frazioni: Assenza, Biaza, Campo, Castelletto, Castello, Magugnano, Marniga, Porto, Sommavilla

Government
  - Mayor: Paolo Formaggioni

Area
  - Total: 51.59 km^{2} (19.92 sq mi)
- Elevation: 69 m (226 ft)

Population (30 April 2017)
  - Total: 2,458
  - Density: 47.64/km^{2} (123.4/sq mi)
- Demonym: Brenzoniani
- Time zone: UTC+1 (CET)
  - Summer (DST): UTC+2 (CEST)
- Postal code: 37010
- Dialing code: 045
- Website: Official website

Brenzone sul Garda is a comune (municipality) in the Province of Verona in the Italian region of Veneto, located on the eastern shore of Lake Garda about 120 kilometres (75 miles) west of Venice and about 35 km (22 mi) northwest of Verona.

The municipality of Brenzone is formed by the frazioni (subdivisions, mainly villages and hamlets) of Assenza, Biaza, Campo, Castelletto, Castello, Magugnano (municipal seat), Marniga, Porto, and Sommavilla.

Brenzone borders the following municipalities: Ferrara di Monte Baldo, Gargnano, Malcesine, San Zeno di Montagna, Tignale, Torri del Benaco, and Tremosine.
