= Brentino Belluno =

- Comune
- Comune di Brentino Belluno
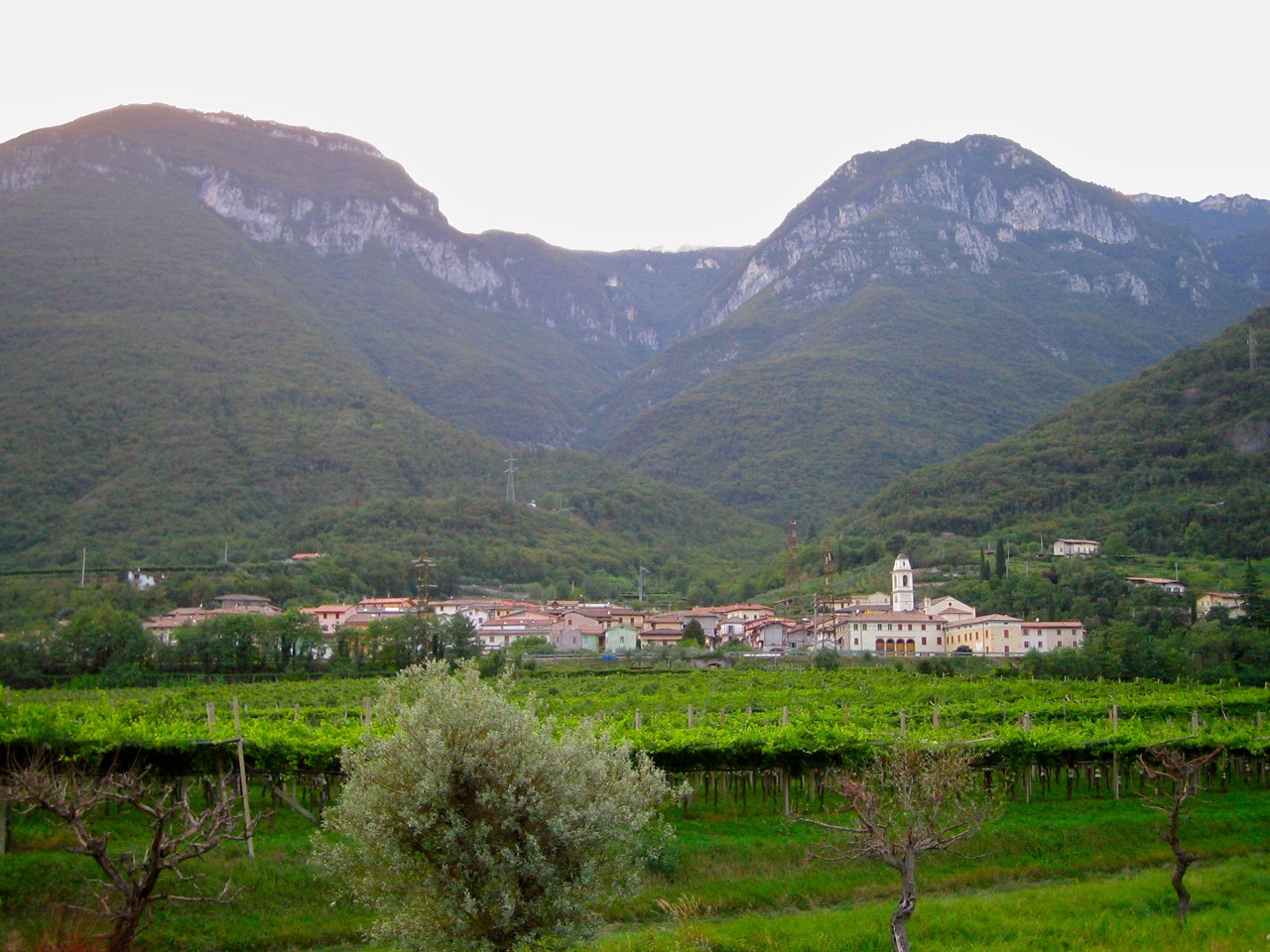
- The village of Belluno

- Location within Italy Location within Veneto
- Coordinates: 45°39′N 10°54′E
- Country: Italy
- Region: Veneto
- Province: Verona (VR)
- Frazioni: Belluno Veronese, Rivalta, Brentino, Preabocco

Government
  - Mayor: Alberto Mazzurana

Area
  - Total: 25.99 km^{2} (10.03 sq mi)
- Elevation: 137 m (449 ft)

Population (30 April 2017)
  - Total: 1,380
  - Density: 53.1/km^{2} (138/sq mi)
- Demonym: Brentesi
- Time zone: UTC+1 (CET)
  - Summer (DST): UTC+2 (CEST)
- Postal code: 37020
- Dialing code: 045
- Website: Official website

Brentino Belluno is a comune (municipality) in the Province of Verona in the Italian region Veneto, located about 110 kilometres (68 mi) west of Venice and about 25 kilometres (16 mi) northwest of Verona.

The municipality of Brentino Belluno contains the frazioni (subdivisions, mainly villages and hamlets) Belluno Veronese, Rivalta, Brentino, and Preabocco.

Brentino Belluno borders the following municipalities: Avio, Caprino Veronese, Dolcè, Ferrara di Monte Baldo, and Rivoli Veronese.
