= Baldassin =

Baldassin is a surname. Notable people with the surname include:

- Luca Baldassin (born 1994), Italian footballer
- Mike Baldassin (born 1955), American football player
