= Caprino Veronese =

- Comune
- Comune di Caprino Veronese
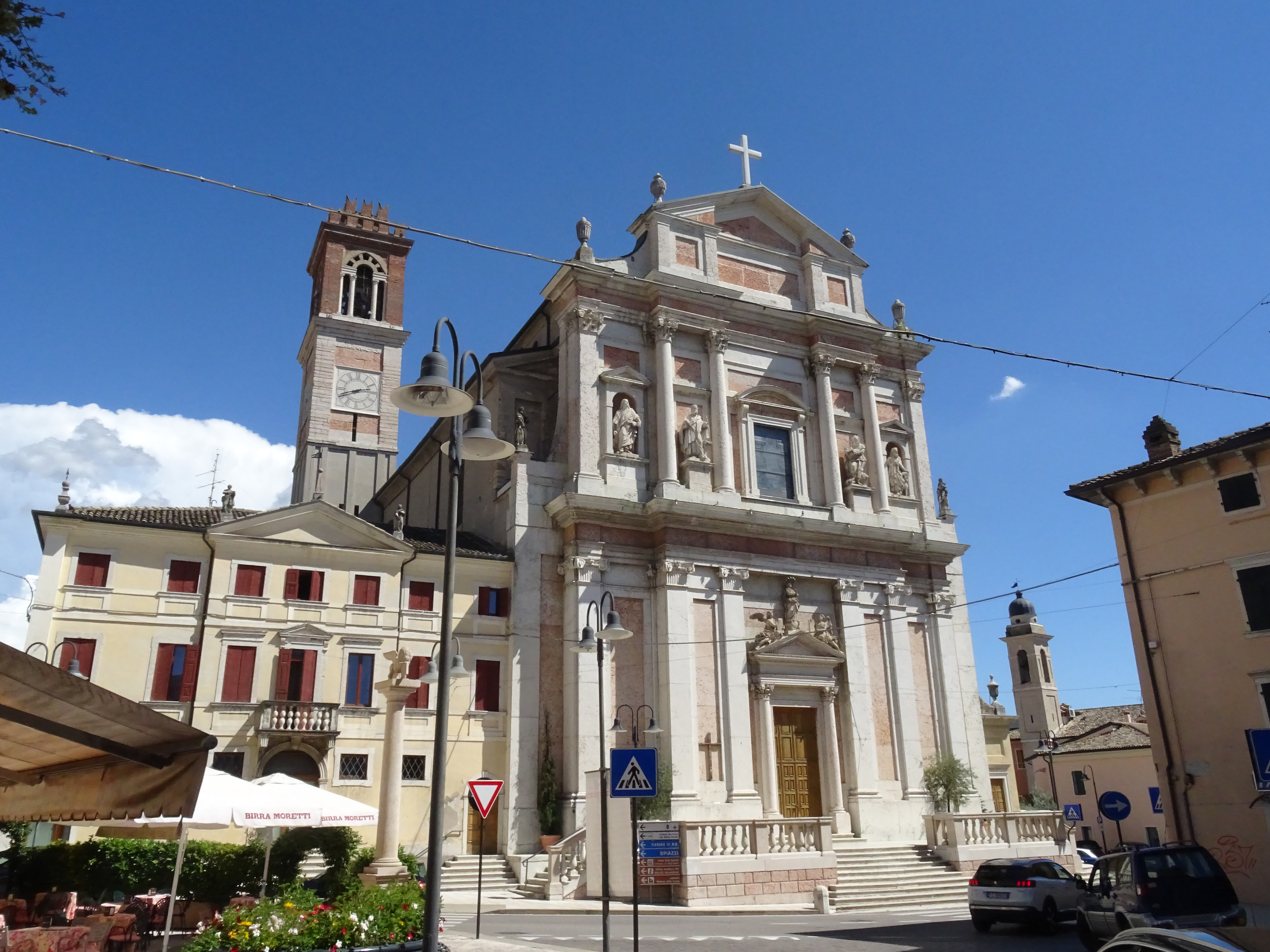
- Santa Maria Maggiore

- Location of Caprino Veronese in Italy Caprino Veronese (Veneto)
- Coordinates: 45°36′N 10°48′E
- Country: Italy
- Region: Veneto
- Province: Verona (VR)
- Frazioni: Pesina, Spiazzi and Pazzon

Government
  - Mayor: Giuseppe Armani (La Civica!)

Area
  - Total: 47.3 km^{2} (18.3 sq mi)
- Elevation: 254 m (833 ft)

Population (Dec. 2004)
  - Total: 7,657
  - Density: 162/km^{2} (419/sq mi)
- Demonym: Caprinesi
- Time zone: UTC+1 (CET)
  - Summer (DST): UTC+2 (CEST)
- Postal code: 37013, 37010
- Dialing code: 045
- ISTAT code: 023018
- Patron saint: Assumption of Mary
- Saint day: August 2
- Website: Official website (archived)

Caprino Veronese is a comune (municipality) in the Province of Verona in the Italian region Veneto, located about 120 kilometres (75 mi) west of Venice and about 30 kilometres (19 mi) northwest of Verona.

Caprino Veronese borders the following municipalities: Affi, Brentino Belluno, Costermano, Ferrara di Monte Baldo, Rivoli Veronese, and San Zeno di Montagna.

== Monuments ==
- Sanctuary of Our Lady of the Crown

== Demographic evolution ==
Historical population

Year	Pop.	±%
1861	?	—
1871	5,681	—
1881	6,075	+6.9%
1901	6,715	+10.5%
1911	7,328	+9.1%
1921	7,474	+2.0%
1931	7,730	+3.4%

Year	Pop.	±%
1936	7,308	−5.5%
1951	7,148	−2.2%
1961	6,774	−5.2%
1971	6,732	−0.6%
1981	6,887	+2.3%
1991	6,952	+0.9%
2001	7,493	+7.8%

Source: Data from ISTAT

== Twin towns ==
- Gau-Algesheim, Germany, since 1984
- Saulieu, France, since 2004

== Trivia ==
Caprino Veronese is the headquarters of TeleRadio1, a German-language radio station serving German tourists as well as German expats and Italians who are interested in learning German. It was founded by Jens Niklas and Francesca Cargnoni. The station broadcasts both Italian as well as international music. News is broadcast exclusively in German, with the news provided by TeleRadio1's parent company LautFM.

== See also ==
- Verona-Caprino-Garda railway
