= Sanctuary of Our Lady of the Crown =

Sanctuary dedicate to the Virgin mary in Spiazzi, Italy

Sanctuary of Our Lady of the Crown Santuario della Madonna della Corona (in Italian)
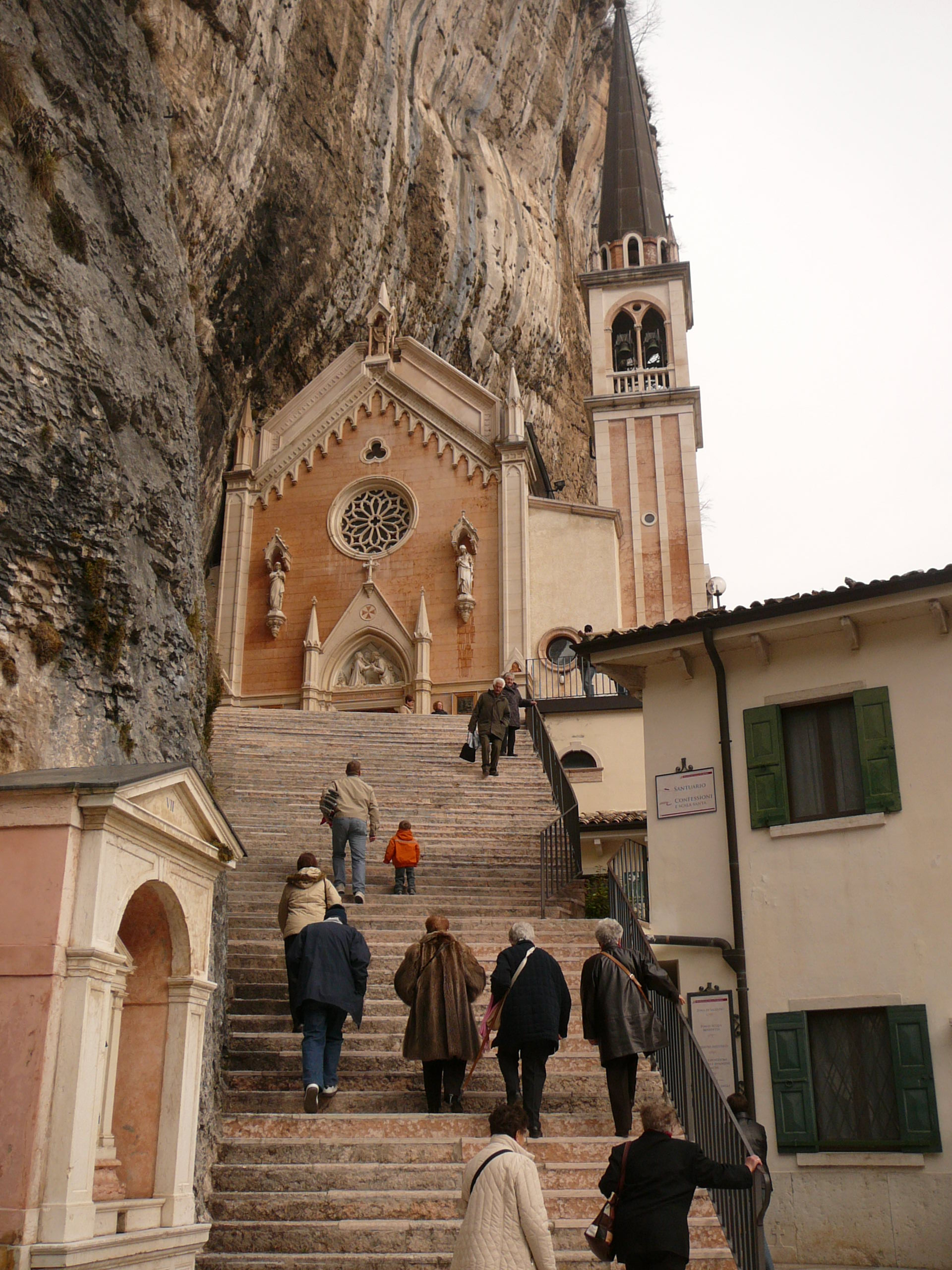
- The entrance of the sanctuary

Religion
- Affiliation: Roman Catholic
- Ecclesiastical or organisational status: Sanctuary

Location
- Location: Ferrara di Monte Baldo, Italy
- Interactive map of Sanctuary of Our Lady of the Crown; Santuario della Madonna della Corona (in Italian)
- Coordinates: 45.6833333°N 10.8500000°E

Architecture
- Groundbreaking: 16522

Website
- https://www.madonnadellacorona.it/

The Sanctuary of Our Lady of the Crown is a shrine in Ferrara di Monte Baldo, Province of Verona, northern Italy. It is a 16th-century church built amidst the territories of the municipalities of Ferrara di Monte Baldo and Spiazzi, frazione of Caprino Veronese, in the province of Verona, Italy.

Nestled within the rock, it is situated against an overhang at an altitude of 775 meters above sea level, overlooking the Adige Valley. It is about 42 kilometres (26 mi) north of Verona.

== Bibliography ==
- Rino Cammilleri, Tutti i giorni con Maria, calendario delle apparizioni, Milan, Edicions Ares, 2020 (ISBN 978-88-815-59-367).
- Maurizio Delibori, Ferrara di Monte Baldo, dalle creste baldesi al vajo dell’Orsa. La sua storia naturale ed umana con 7 itinerari nel territorio, Centro turistico giovanile A.C.a: “M. Baldo”, 2017.
- Andrea Vigna, Istoria della Madonna della Corona posta in Monte Baldo, Bassano, 1668.
