= San Zeno di Montagna =

San Zeno di Montagna San Xen de Montagna
- Comune
- Comune di San Zeno di Montagna
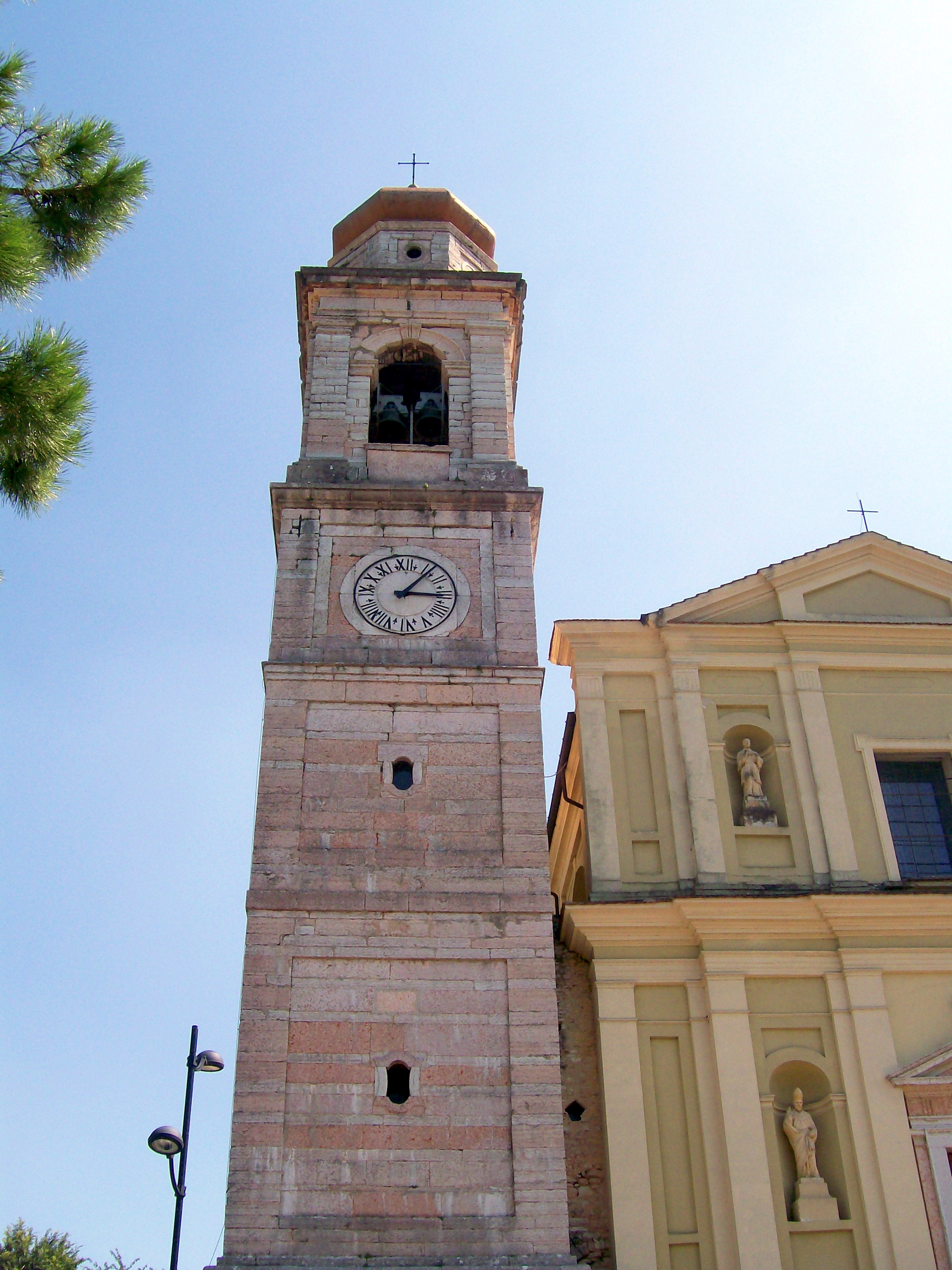

- Location within Italy Location within Veneto
- Coordinates: 45°38′N 10°44′E
- Country: Italy
- Region: Veneto
- Province: Verona (VR)
- Frazioni: Lumini, Prada

Government
  - Mayor: Maurizio Castellani

Area
  - Total: 28.24 km^{2} (10.90 sq mi)
- Elevation: 680 m (2,230 ft)

Population (30 November 2016)
  - Total: 1,371
  - Density: 48.55/km^{2} (125.7/sq mi)
- Demonym: Sanzenesi
- Time zone: UTC+1 (CET)
  - Summer (DST): UTC+2 (CEST)
- Postal code: 37010
- Dialing code: 045
- Website: Official website

San Zeno di Montagna (Venetian: San Xen de Montagna) is a comune (municipality) in the Province of Verona in the Italian region Veneto, located about 130 kilometres (81 miles) west of Venice and about 30 km (19 mi) northwest of Verona.

San Zeno di Montagna borders the following municipalities: Brenzone, Caprino Veronese, Costermano, Ferrara di Monte Baldo, and Torri del Benaco.
