= Walter Bressan =

Italian footballer (born 1981)

Personal information
- Date of birth: 26 January 1981 (age 45)
- Place of birth: Oderzo, Italy
- Height: 1.83 m (6 ft 0 in)
- Position: Goalkeeper

Team information
- Current team: Sampdoria (GK coach)

Youth career
- 1991–1994: Fossalta Piave
- 1994–1998: Atalanta

Senior career*
Years	Team	Apps	(Gls)
1998–2003	Atalanta	0	(0)
2001–2002	→ Spezia (loan)	10	(0)
2002–2003	→ Treviso (loan)	4	(0)
2003–2005	Pavia	45	(0)
2005–2008	Arezzo	51	(0)
2007–2008	→ Grosseto (loan)	38	(0)
2008–2012	Sassuolo	98	(0)
2011–2012	→ Varese (loan)	36	(0)
2012–2014	Varese	59	(0)
2014–2015	Cesena	1	(0)
2015–2017	Chievo	0	(0)
Total		342	(0)

International career
1999	Italy U18	2	(0)

Managerial career
- 2017–2018: Chievo (GK coach)
- 2018–2019: Cagliari U19 (GK coach)
- 2019–2020: Cagliari (GK coach)
- 2020: Cagliari U19 (GK coach)
- 2020: Genoa (GK coach)
- 2021–2024: Cagliari (GK coach)
- 2024–: Sampdoria (GK coach)
- * Club domestic league appearances and goals

Walter Bressan (born 26 January 1981) is an Italian former professional footballer who played as a goalkeeper, currently goalkeeping coach at Serie B club Sampdoria.

== Playing career ==
After starting his career as part of the Atalanta youth system, Bressan subsequently moved to the lower leagues, playing at Serie B level for Arezzo, Grosseto, Sassuolo and Varese. In 2014 he moved to then-Serie A club Cesena as a backup goalkeeper, making his Serie A debut in the club's final 2014–15 Serie A league game, a 0–5 loss to Torino. He retired in 2017 after two seasons at Chievo with no first team appearances.

== Coaching career ==
In 2017 Bressan joined Chievo as a goalkeeping coach under Rolando Maran. He left Chievo in 2018 to join Cagliari's youth system coaching staff, being subsequently promoted to first team duties the following year.

In 2020 he followed Maran at Genoa.

In July 2021 he returned to Cagliari as a goalkeeping coach under first team manager Leonardo Semplici, being confirmed also as part of the coaching staff of successors Walter Mazzarri and Alessandro Agostini. He was successively confirmed on his role also for the 2022–23 season, under new head coach Fabio Liverani.

== Career statistics ==
Appearances and goals by club, season and competition
Club	Season	League			National cup		Other		Total	
Club	Season	Division	Apps	Goals	Apps	Goals	Apps	Goals	Apps	Goals
Spezia (loan)	2001–02	Serie C1	10	0	—		1	0	11	0
Treviso (loan)	2002–03	Serie C1	4	0	3	0	—		7	0
Pavia	2003–04	Serie C1	32	0	—		—		32	0
Pavia	2004–05	Serie C1	13	0	—		4	0	17	0
Pavia	Total		45	0	—		4	0	49	0
Arezzo	2005–06	Serie B	40	0	0	0	—		40	0
Arezzo	2006–07	Serie B	11	0	0	0	—		11	0
Arezzo	Total		51	0	0	0	—		51	0
Grosseto (loan)	2007–08	Serie B	38	0	1	0	—		39	0
Sassuolo	2008–09	Serie B	41	0	2	0	—		43	0
Sassuolo	2009–10	Serie B	37	0	2	0	—		39	0
Sassuolo	2010–11	Serie B	20	0	0	0	—		20	0
Sassuolo	Total		98	0	4	0	—		102	0
Varese (loan)	2011–12	Serie B	36	0	0	0	4	0	40	0
Varese	2012–13	Serie B	32	0	1	0	—		33	0
Varese	2013–14	Serie B	27	0	0	0	0	0	27	0
Varese	Varese total		95	0	1	0	4	0	100	0
Cesena	2014–15	Serie A	1	0	0	0	—		1	0
Chievo	2015–16	Serie A	0	0	0	0	—		0	0
Chievo	2016–17	Serie A	0	0	0	0	—		0	3
Chievo	Total		0	0	0	0	—		0	0
Career total			342	0	9	0	9	0	360	0

== Honours ==
Treviso

- Serie C1: 2002–03
- Supercoppa di Serie C: 2003
