= Torri del Benaco =

- Comune
- Comune di Torri del Benaco
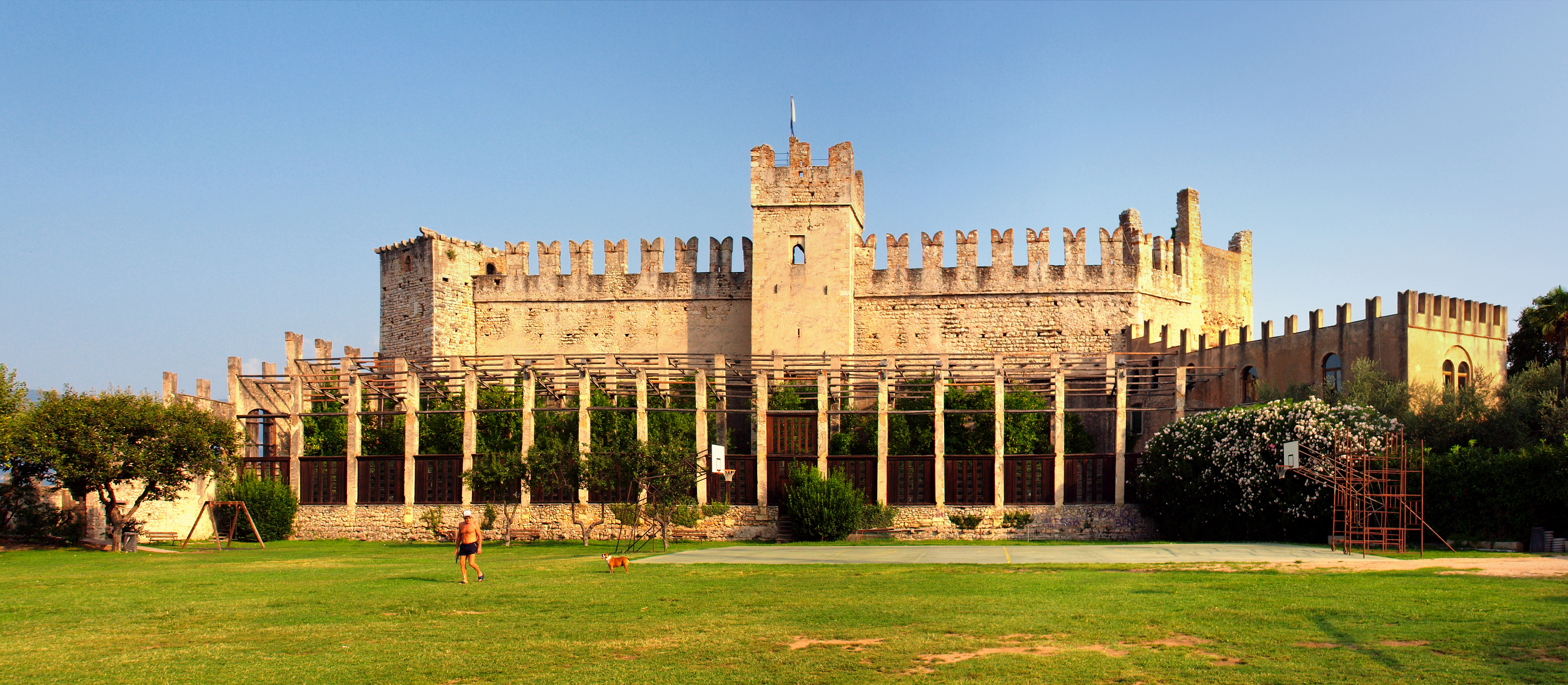
- Scaliger Castle

- Coat of arms

- Location within Italy Location within Veneto
- Coordinates: 45°37′N 10°41′E
- Country: Italy
- Region: Veneto
- Province: Verona (VR)
- Frazioni: Albisano, Pai

Government
  - Mayor: Stefano Nicotra

Area
  - Total: 51.4 km^{2} (19.8 sq mi)
- Elevation: 67 m (220 ft)

Population (1 January 2011)
  - Total: 2,963
  - Density: 57.6/km^{2} (149/sq mi)
- Demonym: Torresani
- Time zone: UTC+1 (CET)
  - Summer (DST): UTC+2 (CEST)
- Postal code: 37010
- Dialing code: 045
- Website: Official website

Torri del Benaco is a comune (municipality) in the Province of Verona in the Italian region Veneto, located about 130 kilometres (81 miles) west of Venice and about 30 km (19 mi) northwest of Verona, on the eastern coast of the Lake Garda.

Torri del Benaco borders the following municipalities: Brenzone, Costermano, Garda, Gardone Riviera, Gargnano, Salò, San Felice del Benaco, San Zeno di Montagna, and Toscolano-Maderno. It is home to a 14th-century castle which belonged to the Scaliger family, and which perhaps occupies the site of an ancient Roman castrum. It now houses an Ethnographic Museum.

== Gallery ==
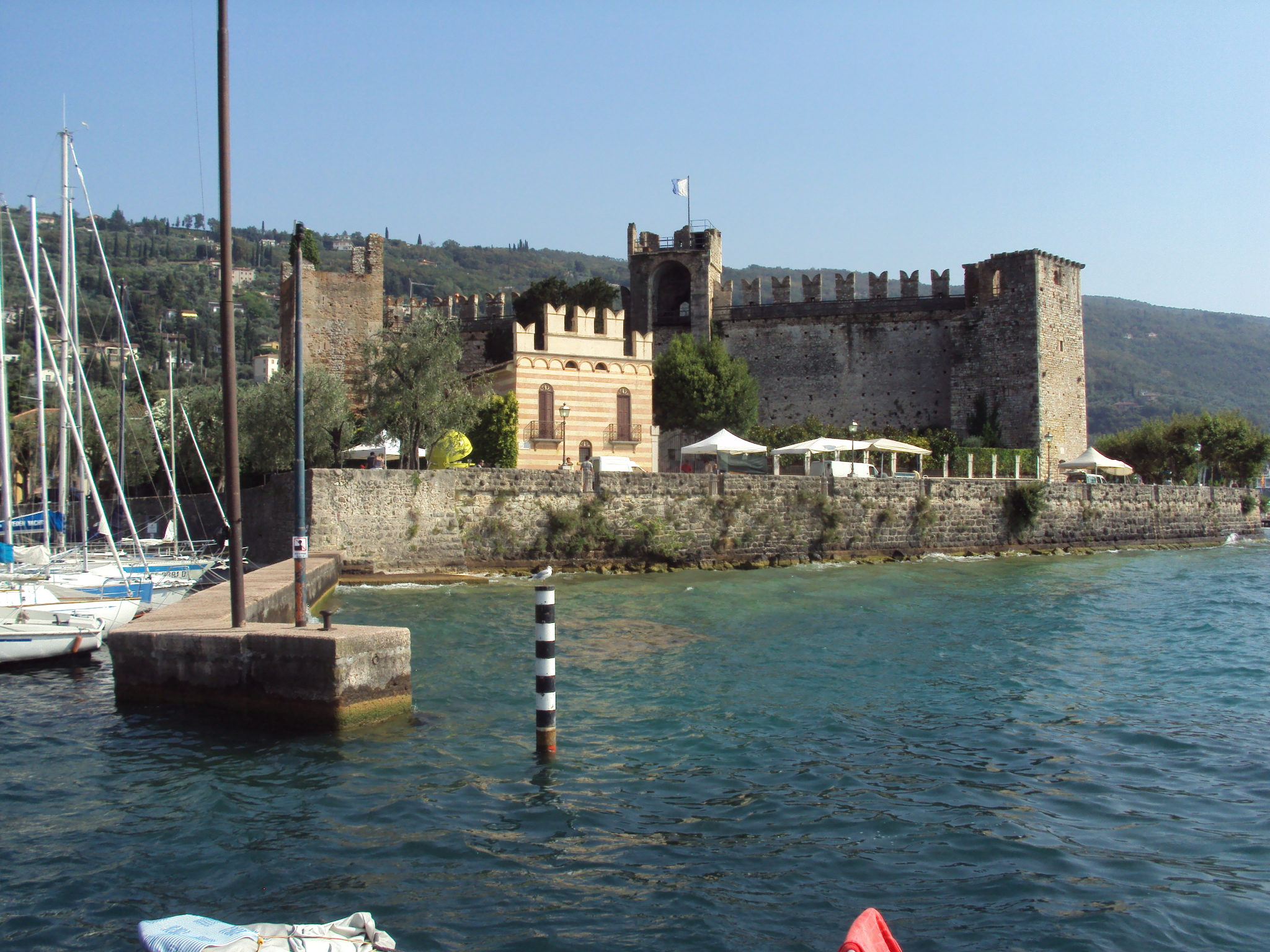

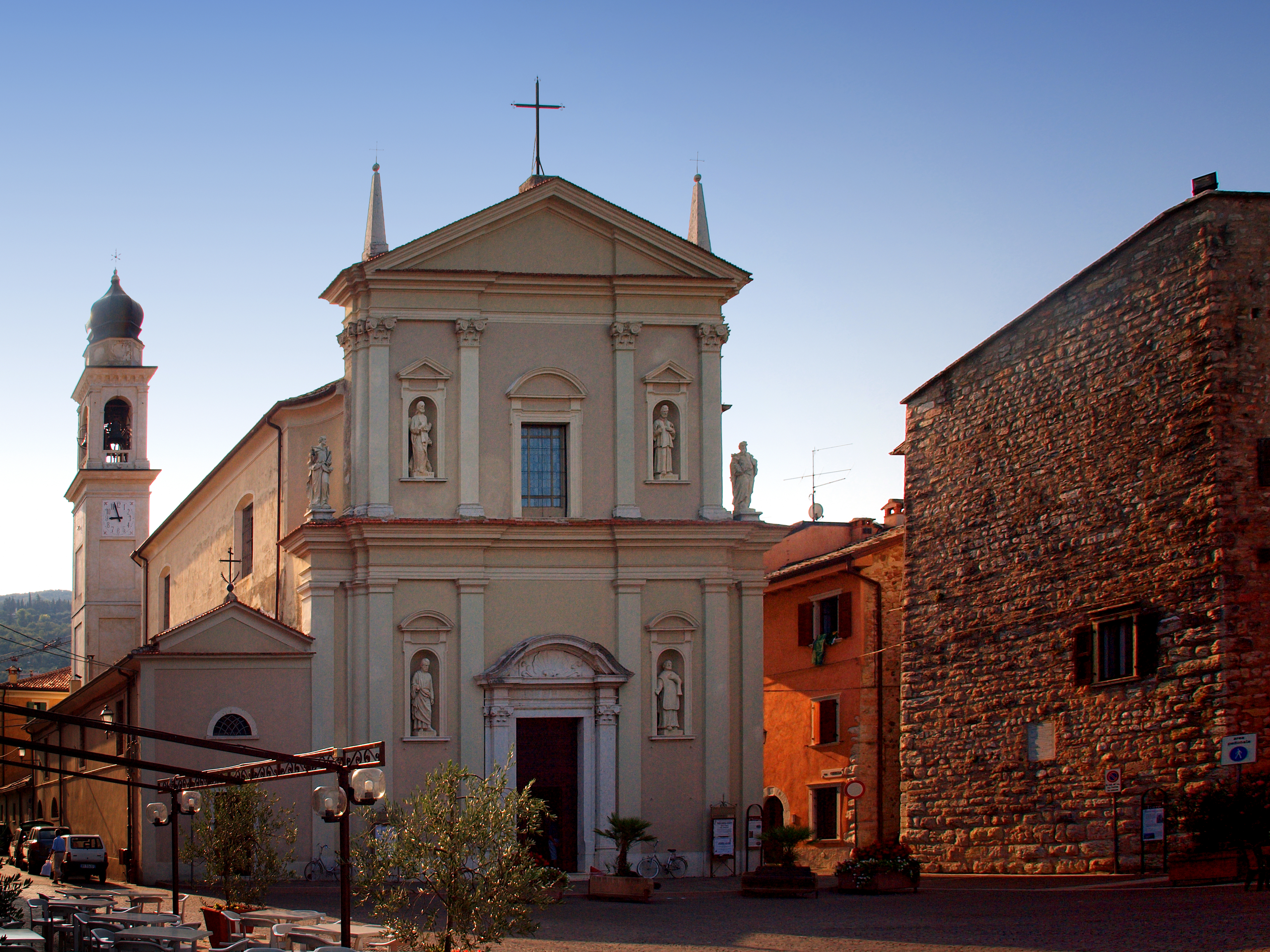
Church

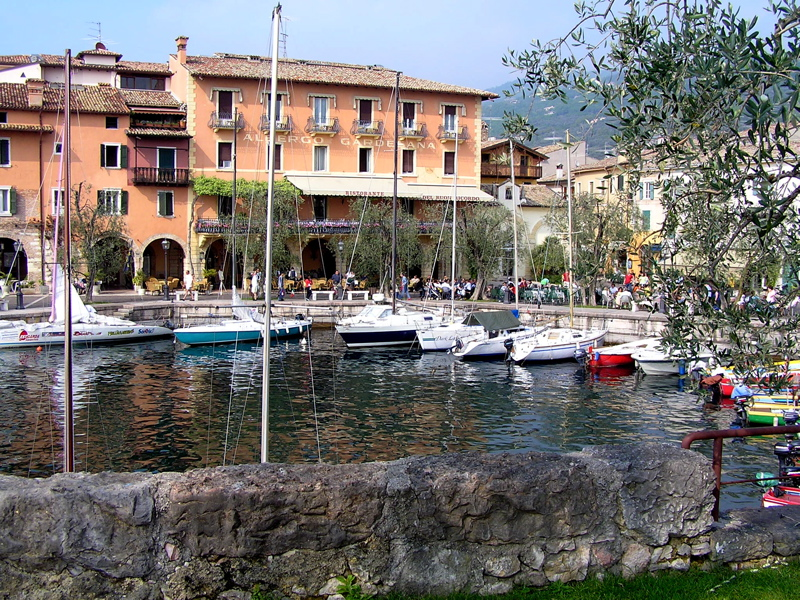
Old Port

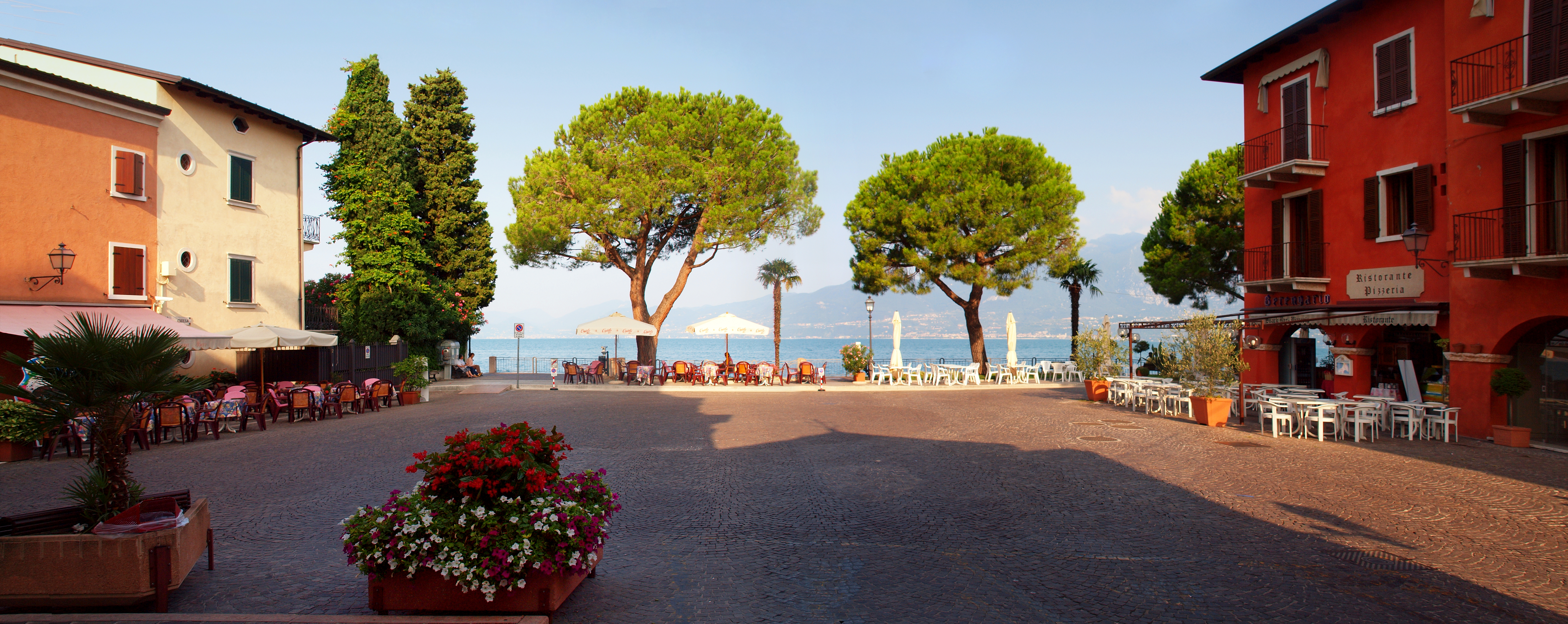

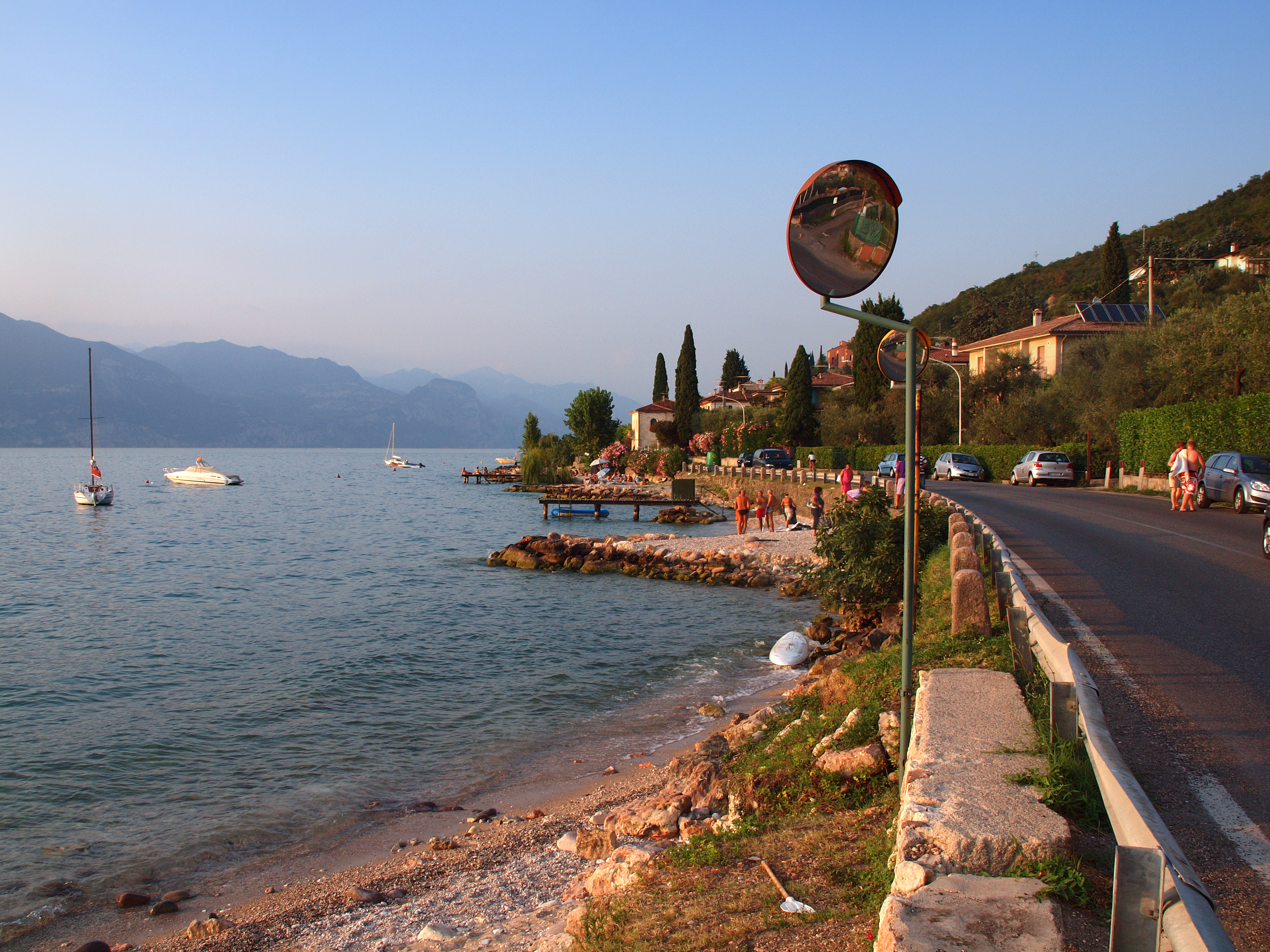

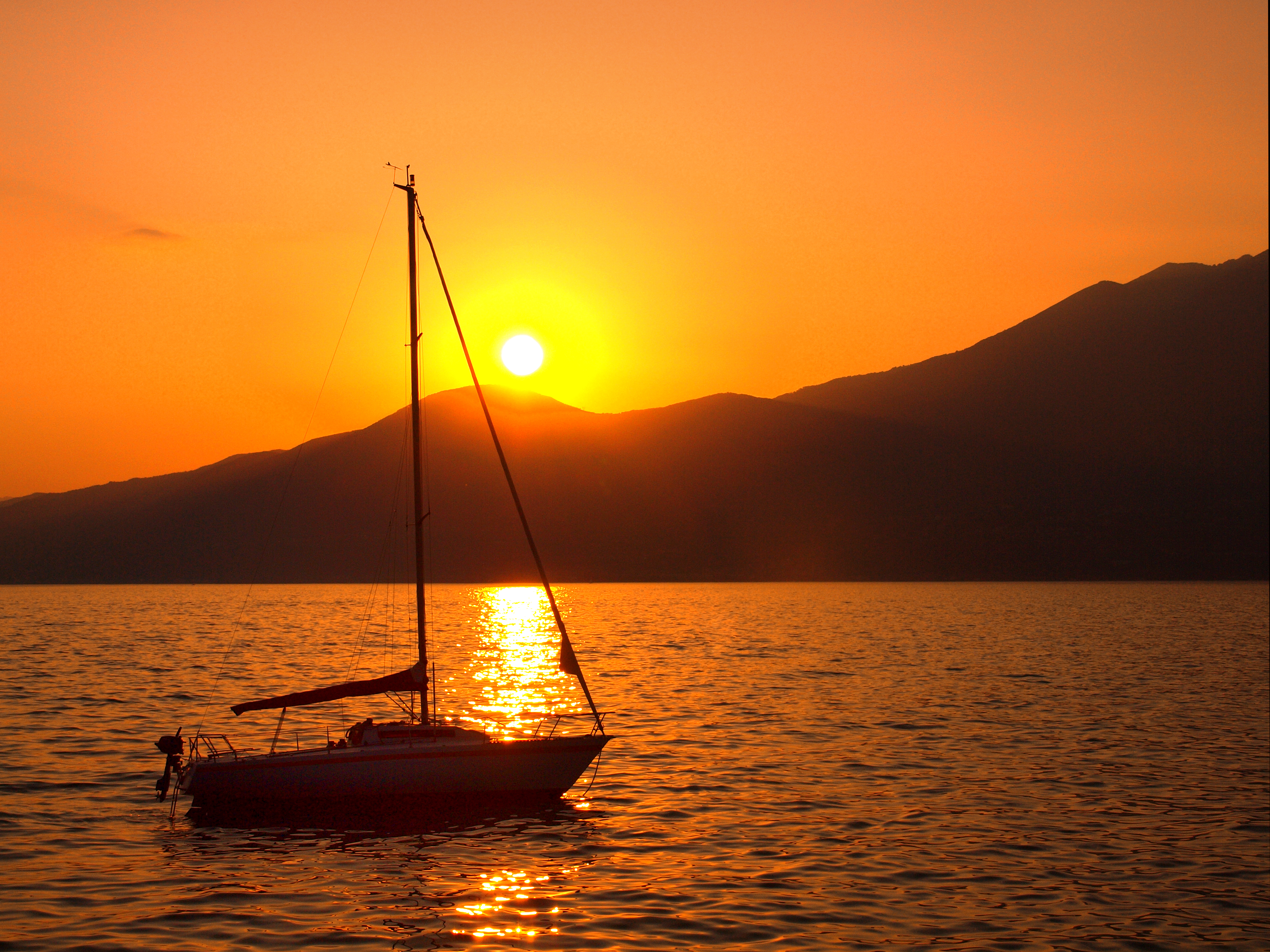

== Twin towns ==
Torri del Benaco is twinned with:

- Cadaqués, Spain, since 2006
