= Kevin Magri =

Italian footballer

Personal information
- Date of birth: 10 August 1995 (age 31)
- Place of birth: Campobasso, Italy
- Height: 1.84 m (6 ft 0 in)
- Position: Centre-back

Team information
- Current team: Sarnese (on loan from Scafatese)
- Number: 30

Youth career
- Chievo

Senior career*
Years	Team	Apps	(Gls)
2014–2015	Chievo	0	(0)
2014–2015	→ Lumezzane (loan)	4	(0)
2015	→ Reggina (loan)	2	(0)
2015–2018	Vicenza	6	(0)
2015–2016	→ Paganese (loan)	14	(0)
2017	→ Taranto (loan)	12	(0)
2018–2019	Campobasso	32	(4)
2019–2020	Avezzano	20	(1)
2020	Legnago	0	(0)
2020–2021	Matelica	27	(1)
2021–2022	Campobasso	13	(0)
2022	Nocerina	10	(0)
2022–2024	Cavese	47	(2)
2024–	Scafatese	20	(0)
2026–	→ Sarnese (loan)	0	(0)
- * Club domestic league appearances and goals as of 3 May 2026

Kevin Magri (born 10 August 1995) is an Italian footballer who plays as a centre back for Serie D club Sarnese on loan from Scafatese.

== Career ==
=== Chievo ===
Born in Campobasso, Molise region, Magri started his career at Veneto side Chievo. In July 2014 he was signed by Lumezzane in a temporary deal. On 2 February 2015 Magri and Amedeo Benedetti were signed by Reggina.

=== Vicenza ===
On 29 June 2015 Magri was signed by Vicenza in a 4-year contract, with Damir Bartulovič moved to Verona. Magri picked no.15 shirt, vacated by Mattia Filippi who was released. On 31 August 2015 Magri was signed by Paganese in a temporary deal.

On 17 January 2017 Magri was signed by Taranto on a temporary deal.

On 4 October 2018 he joined to Campobasso.

=== Serie C ===
On 24 September 2020 he signed with Matelica.

On 3 August 2021 Magri returned to Campobasso in Serie C.
