= Nicola Rigoni =

Italian footballer (born 1990)

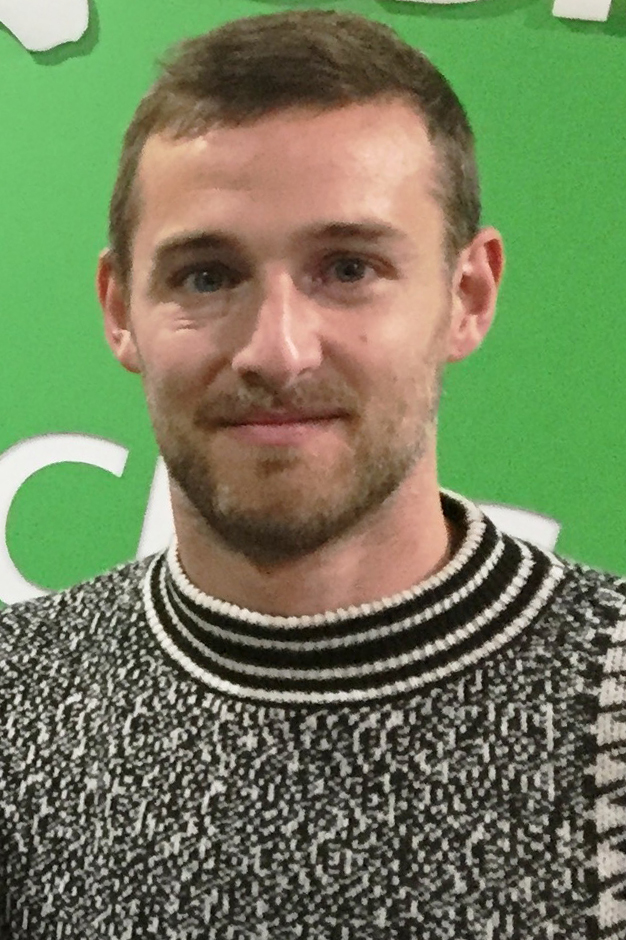
- Rigoni in 2020

Personal information
- Date of birth: 12 November 1990 (age 36)
- Place of birth: Schio, Italy
- Height: 1.87 m (6 ft 2 in)
- Position: Midfielder

Team information
- Current team: Montecchio Maggiore
- Number: 17

Youth career
- Vicenza

Senior career*
| Years | Team | Apps | (Gls) |
| 2007–2010 | Vicenza | 31 | (1) |
| 2010–2011 | Palermo | 4 | (0) |
| 2011 | → Vicenza (loan) | 9 | (0) |
| 2011–2012 | Vicenza | 28 | (4) |
| 2012–2019 | Chievo | 79 | (4) |
| 2012–2013 | → Vicenza (loan) | 8 | (1) |
| 2013–2014 | → Reggina (loan) | 16 | (0) |
| 2014–2015 | → Cittadella (loan) | 49 | (4) |
| 2019–2023 | Monza | 15 | (2) |
| 2021 | → Pescara (loan) | 8 | (1) |
| 2021–2022 | → Cesena (loan) | 19 | (0) |
| 2023– | Montecchio Maggiore | 2 | (0) |

International career
| 2007 | Italy U17 | 2 | (0) |
| 2011 | Italy U20 | 2 | (0) |
- * Club domestic league appearances and goals as of 17 September 2023

Nicola Rigoni (born 12 November 1990) is an Italian professional footballer who plays as a midfielder for Serie D club Montecchio Maggiore.

== Club career ==
=== Vicenza ===
A promising midfielder, and younger brother of Serie A footballer Luca Rigoni, he made his professional debut in the final weeks of the 2006–07 season with Vicenza. He then spent the 2007–08 season with the Primavera (under-20) squad, and collecting another first team appearance in the season. He was permanently promoted to the first team in the second part of the 2008–09 season, and his performances led Serie A outfit Palermo to sign the player in a bid which involved also the co-ownership of Sicilian youngster and Italian under-20 international Gianvito Misuraca, who joined Vicenza from the rosanero youth system. Half of the registration rights of Rigoni was valued at €990,000, while those of Misuraca were valued at €240,000. The deal involved €750,000 cash. Rigoni will spend the 2009–10 season on loan to Vicenza in order to give him a chance to play more first team football before to join Palermo.

=== Palermo ===
He finally arrived to Palermo in July 2010, joining the pre-season training camp of the rosanero, and made his debut with the Sicilian team in the return leg of the 2010–11 UEFA Europa League playoff round against NK Maribor as a second-half substitute for Fabio Liverani. He then appeared as a used substitute also in the first Serie A league game of the season against Cagliari.

=== Return to Vicenza ===
On 28 January 2011, he was loaned out to Vicenza for the remainder of the season.

In June 2011 Vicenza bought back Rigoni for €200,000 and Luca Di Matteo returned to Palermo also for €200,000. In January 2012 Rigoni signed a new 3 1/2-year contract with Vicenza.

=== Chievo and loans to Vicenza, Reggina, and Cittadella ===
After Vicenza was re-admitted to Serie B, on 5 September 2012 Nicola Rigoni was sold to Chievo (where his brother plays) in order to raise profit for new season, for €800,000. Along with Davide Gavazzi who left for Sampdoria, they returned to Vicenza for new season. On 19 August 2013, he was signed by another Serie B club Reggina Calcio.

=== Monza and loans to Pescara and Cesena ===
On 24 July 2019, he signed a 3-year contract with Serie C club Monza. On 26 January 2021, Rigoni moved to Serie B club Pescara on a six-month loan deal.

On 27 August 2021, Rigoni was sent to Cesena on a one-year loan. He terminated his contract with Monza on mutual terms on 20 January 2023.

== Career statistics ==
=== Club ===
As of match played 5 December 2021

Appearances and goals by club, season and competition
| Club | Season | League | | | National cup | | League cup | | Continental | | Total | |
| Club | Season | Division | Apps | Goals | Apps | Goals | Apps | Goals | Apps | Goals | Apps | Goals |
|---|---|---|---|---|---|---|---|---|---|---|---|---|
| Vicenza | 2006–07 | Serie B | 1 | 0 | 0 | 0 | — | | — | | 1 | 0 |
| Vicenza | 2007–08 | Serie B | 2 | 0 | 0 | 0 | — | | — | | 2 | 0 |
| Vicenza | 2008–09 | Serie B | 9 | 1 | 1 | 0 | — | | — | | 10 | 1 |
| Vicenza | 2009–10 | Serie B | 19 | 0 | 1 | 0 | — | | — | | 20 | 0 |
| Vicenza | Total | | 31 | 1 | 2 | 0 | 0 | 0 | 0 | 0 | 33 | 1 |
| Palermo | 2010–11 | Serie A | 4 | 0 | 0 | 0 | — | | 5 (Note: Appearance(s) in UEFA Europa League) | 1 | 9 | 1 |
| Vicenza (loan) | 2010–11 | Serie B | 9 | 0 | 0 | 0 | — | | — | | 9 | 0 |
| Vicenza | 2011–12 | Serie B | 28 | 4 | 1 | 0 | — | | — | | 29 | 4 |
| Vicenza | Total | | 37 | 4 | 1 | 0 | 0 | 0 | 0 | 0 | 38 | 4 |
| Chievo | 2015–16 | Serie A | 28 | 3 | 0 | 0 | — | | — | | 28 | 3 |
| Chievo | 2016–17 | Serie A | 12 | 1 | 1 | 0 | — | | — | | 13 | 1 |
| Chievo | 2017–18 | Serie A | 15 | 0 | 1 | 0 | — | | — | | 16 | 0 |
| Chievo | 2018–19 | Serie A | 24 | 0 | 2 | 1 | — | | — | | 26 | 1 |
| Chievo | Total | | 79 | 4 | 4 | 1 | 0 | 0 | 0 | 0 | 83 | 5 |
| Vicenza (loan) | 2012–13 | Serie B | 8 | 1 | 1 | 0 | — | | — | | 9 | 1 |
| Reggina (loan) | 2013–14 | Serie B | 16 | 0 | 1 | 0 | — | | — | | 17 | 0 |
| Cittadella (loan) | 2013–14 | Serie B | 16 | 1 | 0 | 0 | — | | — | | 16 | 1 |
| Cittadella (loan) | 2014–15 | Serie B | 33 | 3 | 0 | 0 | — | | — | | 33 | 3 |
| Cittadella (loan) | Total | | 49 | 4 | 0 | 0 | 0 | 0 | 0 | 0 | 49 | 4 |
| Monza | 2019–20 | Serie C | 14 | 2 | 2 | 0 | 2 | 0 | — | | 18 | 2 |
| Monza | 2020–21 | Serie B | 1 | 0 | 1 | 0 | — | | — | | 2 | 0 |
| Monza | Total | | 15 | 2 | 3 | 0 | 2 | 0 | 0 | 0 | 20 | 2 |
| Pescara (loan) | 2020–21 | Serie B | 8 | 1 | — | | — | | — | | 8 | 1 |
| Cesena (loan) | 2021–22 | Serie C | 15 | 0 | — | | 1 | 0 | — | | 16 | 0 |
| Career total | | | 262 | 17 | 12 | 1 | 3 | 0 | 5 | 1 | 282 | 19 |

== Honours ==
Monza

- Serie C Group A: 2019–20
