= Luca Baldassin =

Italian footballer

Personal information
- Date of birth: 28 May 1994 (age 32)
- Place of birth: Vittorio Veneto, Italy
- Height: 1.78 m (5 ft 10 in)
- Position: Midfielder

Youth career
- Udinese

Senior career*
Years	Team	Apps	(Gls)
2013–2014	Poggibonsi	32	(1)
2014–2016	Lumezzane	51	(0)
2016	Padova	9	(1)
2016–2018	Chievo	0	(0)
2016	→ Messina (loan)	1	(0)
2016–2017	→ Lupa Roma (loan)	34	(5)
2017–2018	→ Viterbese (loan)	40	(6)
2018–2019	Viterbese	23	(2)
2019–2020	Feralpisalò	4	(0)
2020–2021	Catanzaro	28	(1)
2021–2024	Renate	94	(10)
2024–2025	Campobasso	17	(0)
2025	Ascoli	10	(0)
2025–2026	Picerno	17	(1)

International career
2014–2015	Italy U-21 "C"	2	(0)
- * Club domestic league appearances and goals as of 1 May 2026

Luca Baldassin (born 28 May 1994) is an Italian professional footballer who plays as a midfielder.

== Club career ==
Born in Vittorio Veneto, Italy, Baldassin started his career at Northeastern Italian club Udinese. He was a player for their under-15 team in 2008–09 season, under-17 team in 2009–10 and 2010–11 season. He was booked 6 times in 2010–11 season.

After 2 more seasons for Udinese's reserves, Baldassin moved to Lega Pro 2nd Division club Poggibonsi. The club relegated, both due to the league position and the reduction of total teams and divisions of Lega Pro.

In 2014, he was signed by Lega Pro club Lumezzane. On 1 February 2016 Baldassin moved to Padova in a 5-month contract.

On 10 June 2016 Baldassin was signed by Chievo as a free agent. He and Matteo Brunelli were farmed to Lega Pro Messina on loan. He wore number 18 shirt, He was the starting midfielder in the 4-3-3-formation that winning Siracusa in the round 1 of 2016–17 Lega Pro.

On 1 September 2016 Baldassin and Brunelli were left for fellow third-tier club Lupa Roma from Chievo via Messina, with Felice Gaetano moved to Messina from Napoli via Lupa Roma.

On 24 August 2018, Baldassin joined Serie C club Viterbese on permanent basis, after playing for them on loan in the 2017–18 season.

On 28 November 2019, he signed a contract with Feralpisalò until June 2021.

On 5 October 2020 he moved to Catanzaro on a two-year contract.

On 6 August 2021, he joined Serie C club Renate.

On 4 August 2024, Baldassin signed with Campobasso.

== International career ==
Baldassin was a player for Lega Pro under-21 representative team at 2013–15 International Challenge Trophy. He also played twice in unofficial friendlies, against Italy national under-20 football team and Livorno.
