= Malick Mbaye (footballer, born 1995) =

Senegalese footballer (born 1995)

Maodo Mbaye
Personal information
- Full name: Maodo Malick Mbaye
- Date of birth: 6 November 1995 (age 31)
- Place of birth: Thiès, Senegal
- Height: 1.75 m (5 ft 9 in)
- Position: Central midfielder

Team information
- Current team: Virtus Francavilla
- Number: 24

Youth career
- Trento
- 2013–2014: Chievo

Senior career*
Years	Team	Apps	(Gls)
2012–2013	Trento	1	(0)
2013–2020	Chievo	1	(0)
2014–2015	→ Carpi (loan)	16	(0)
2015–2016	→ Latina (loan)	21	(0)
2016–2019	→ Carpi (loan)	77	(0)
2019	→ Cremonese (loan)	2	(0)
2020–2021	Novara	3	(0)
2021	Matelica	12	(1)
2021–2022	Fermana	32	(1)
2022–2023	Viterbese	21	(0)
2023–2024	Khaitan		
2024–	Virtus Francavilla	9	(0)
- * Club domestic league appearances and goals as of 17 November 2024

Maodo Malick Mbaye (born 6 November 1995) is a Senegalese footballer who plays as a midfielder for Italian Serie D club Virtus Francavilla.

== Club career ==
Mbaye began his career on Trento's youth categories, after departing from Africa in December 2011. After making his first-team debut in the last game of the season, he joined Serie A side Chievo.

On 4 December 2013 Mbaye made his professional debut, starting in a 4-1 home routing over Reggina Calcio, for the campaign's Coppa Italia. On 13 January of the following year he made his top flight debut, coming on as a late substitute in a 1–1 draw at Inter Milan.

On 13 August 2014, Mbaye joined Serie B side Carpi on a season long loan. Mbaye made his debut as a substitute in Carpi's 1-1 draw against Livorno on 30 August 2014.

Mbaye returned to Carpi on another loan in July 2016. The loan was renewed on 11 August 2017 and again renewed on 2 August 2018.

On 31 January 2019 he moved on loan to Cremonese.

On 23 January 2021, he signed with Matelica.

On 25 August 2021 he joined Fermana.

On 11 August 2022, Mbaye moved to Viterbese.

== Honours ==
=== Carpi F.C. ===
- Serie B: 2014–15

=== Chievo Primavera ===
- Campionato Nazionale Primavera: 2013-2014
