= Michele Franco =

Italian footballer (born 1985)

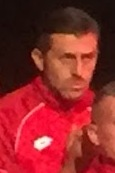
- Franco in 2019

Personal information
- Date of birth: 20 February 1985 (age 41)
- Place of birth: Altamura, Italy
- Height: 1.83 m (6 ft 0 in)
- Position: Left-back

Youth career
- 2003–2005: Bari

Senior career*
Years	Team	Apps	(Gls)
2004–2008	Bari	0	(0)
2005–2006	→ Melfi (loan)	32	(1)
2006–2007	→ Cremonese (loan)	28	(0)
2007–2008	→ Manfredonia (loan)	30	(0)
2008–2011	Como	88	(10)
2011–2012	Padova	17	(0)
2013–2014	Varese	27	(1)
2014	Perugia	4	(0)
2014–2017	Salernitana	59	(5)
2017–2018	Livorno	47	(2)
2018–2019	Siracusa	5	(0)
2019	Trapani	14	(0)
2019–2020	Monza	4	(0)
2020–2021	Pro Sesto	28	(1)
- * Club domestic league appearances and goals

Michele Franco (born 20 February 1985) is an Italian former professional footballer who is the director of football of Serie A club Monza.

== Playing career ==
Franco began his career Bari and, from 2005 to 2008, was sent on loan in Lega Pro to Melfi, Cremonese and Manfredonia. From 2008 to 2011, he played for Como in Lega Pro, before moving in August 2011 to Serie B to Padova. In January 2013, Franco signed a two-year contract with Varese.

On 11 January 2019, he signed with Trapani. On 5 August 2019, he joined Serie C club Monza on a one-year contract. On 2 September 2020, Franco joined newly-promoted Serie C side Pro Sesto.

== Managerial career ==
In July 2022, Franco was appointed club manager of newly-promoted Serie A side Monza. He became director of football on 30 November 2022.

== Honours ==
Monza

- Serie C Group A: 2019–20
