= Matteo Brunelli =

Italian footballer

Personal information
- Date of birth: 6 May 1994 (age 32)
- Place of birth: Prato, Italy
- Height: 1.90 m (6 ft 3 in)
- Position: Goalkeeper

Team information
- Current team: Prato

Youth career
- Pistoiese
- 2009–2010: Prato
- 2010–2012: Milan

Senior career*
Years	Team	Apps	(Gls)
2012–2015	Prato	33	(0)
2015	Carpi	0	(0)
2015–2018	Chievo	0	(0)
2015–2016	→ Pisa (loan)	9	(0)
2016	→ Messina (loan)	0	(0)
2016–2017	→ Lupa Roma (loan)	13	(0)
2017–2018	→ Carpi (loan)	0	(0)
2018–	Prato	1	(0)
- * Club domestic league appearances and goals as of 2 October 2018

Matteo Brunelli (born 6 May 1994) is an Italian footballer who plays for Serie D club Prato.

== Club career ==
=== Youth career ===
Born in Prato, Tuscany, Brunelli started his career at A.C. Pistoiese. He was a player for their under-15 team in 2008–09 season. In summer 2009 he was signed by Prato. On 30 July 2010 Brunelli moved to A.C. Milan, which he was a member of their under-17 team in 2010–11 season. He played once for Milan's reserves in the next season.

=== Prato ===
In summer 2012 Brunelli returned to Prato. He was the player of both first team and the reserves.

=== Carpi ===
On 16 January 2015 Brunelli was signed by Serie B club Carpi in a 6-month deal on a free transfer.

=== Chievo and loans ===
On 30 June 2015 Brunelli was signed by Serie A club Chievo. On 17 July 2015 he was farmed to Lega Pro club Pisa. In July 2016 Brunelli and Baldassin were farmed to Lega Pro Messina from Chievo on loan. On 1 September they left for Lupa Roma from Chievo via Messina, with Felice Gaetano moved to Messina from Napoli via Lupa Roma.

Brunelli immediately became the first choice keeper, ahead of Tomas Švedkauskas.

== International career ==
Brunelli received a call-up from Italy national under-20 football team in October 2013. However, he did not play any game for the team.
