= Damir Bartulovič =

Slovenian footballer

Personal information
- Date of birth: 22 February 1996 (age 30)
- Place of birth: Koper, Slovenia
- Height: 1.85 m (6 ft 1 in)
- Position: Forward

Team information
- Current team: Buje
- Number: 14

Youth career
- –2013: Luka Koper
- 2015–2016: Chievo

Senior career*
Years	Team	Apps	(Gls)
2013–2015	Vicenza	1	(0)
2016–2019	Chievo	0	(0)
2016–2017	→ Como (loan)	2	(0)
2017–2018	→ Aluminij (loan)	8	(1)
2018	→ Mosta (loan)	5	(3)
2018–2019	→ Albissola (loan)	8	(0)
2019–2020	Folgore Caratese	13	(3)
2020–2021	San Giorgio Sedico		
2021–2022	Latte Dolce		
2022–	Buje		

International career
2013	Slovenia U-17	3	(0)
2014	Slovenia U-19	4	(0)
- * Club domestic league appearances and goals as of 14:29, 14 December 2019 (UTC)

Damir Bartulovič (born 22 February 1996) is a Slovenian football player. He plays for NK Buje.

== Club career ==
He made his Serie B debut for Vicenza on 28 October 2014 in a game against Modena.

On 29 July 2019, he joined Serie D club Folgore Caratese and signed for Sassari Calcio Latte Dolce in September 2021.
