= Ferrara di Monte Baldo =

- Comune
- Comune di Ferrara di Monte Baldo
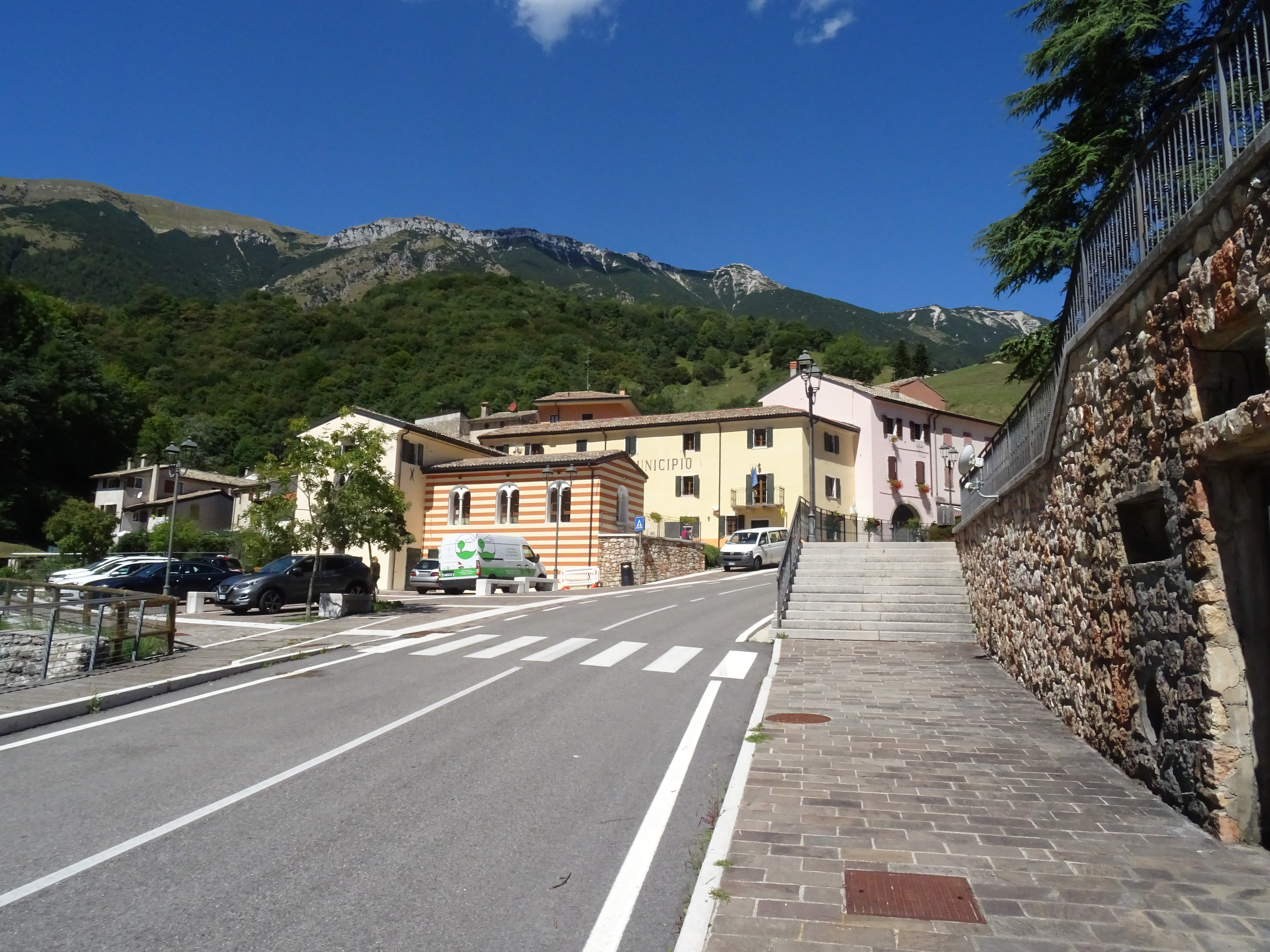

- Coat of arms

- Location within Italy Location within Veneto
- Coordinates: 45°41′N 10°51′E
- Country: Italy
- Region: Veneto
- Province: Verona (VR)
- Frazioni: Novezza, Novezzina

Government
  - Mayor: Paolo Rossi

Area
  - Total: 26.89 km^{2} (10.38 sq mi)
- Elevation: 856 m (2,808 ft)

Population (31 July 2017)
  - Total: 228
  - Density: 8.48/km^{2} (22.0/sq mi)
- Demonym: Ferraresi
- Time zone: UTC+1 (CET)
  - Summer (DST): UTC+2 (CEST)
- Postal code: 37020
- Dialing code: 045
- Website: Official website

Ferrara di Monte Baldo is a comune (municipality) in the Province of Verona in the Italian region Veneto, located in the Valle dell'Orsa about 120 kilometres (75 mi) west of Venice and about 30 kilometres (19 mi) northwest of Verona.

The Monte Baldo is located nearby.
