= Verona-Caprino-Garda railway =

Former railway in Italy

Verona-Caprino-Garda
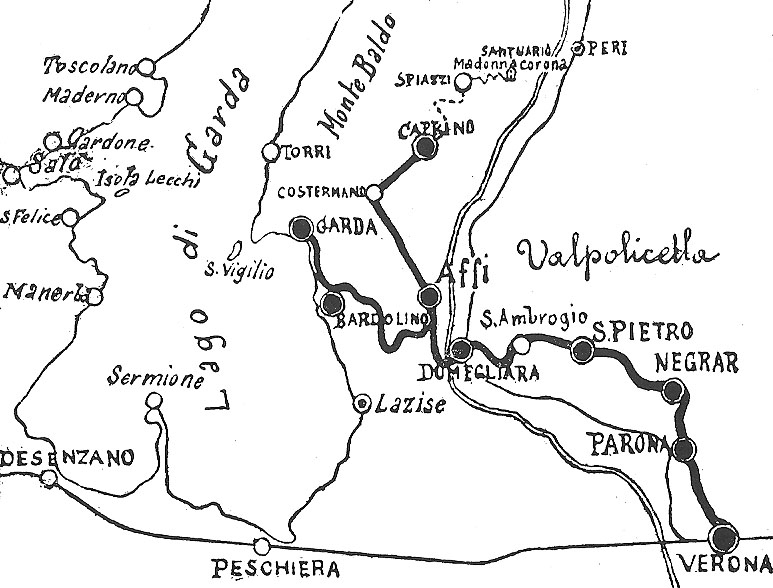
- Country: Italy
- Start: Verona
- End: Caprino
- Activation: 1889 / 1904
- Closure: 1959
- Previous managers: FVCG; Società Veneta; Province of Verona; SAER
- Length: 45.404 km
- Gauge: 1435 mm
- Branches: Affi-Garda

The Verona-Affi-Caprino railway with the Affi-Garda branch line was an Italian railway that connected Verona to Lake Garda and the slopes of Mount Baldo, passing through Valpolicella. The route fell entirely within the territory of the Province of Verona.

Built through the efforts of a promoting committee and supported by many mayors of the area, it represented an important step in the social and industrial development of the towns through which it passed.

The first section was inaugurated in 1889, while the entire railway was decommissioned in 1959 due to lack of investment and competition from road transport.

== History ==
Route	Inauguration
Verona-Caprino	August 4, 1889
Affi-Garda	January 31, 1904

=== Project and establishment of the railway ===
A work of high utility and guaranteed success.

— The committee promoting the railway

In the second half of the 19th century, the inhabitants of Garda, Costermano, Bardolino, and Affi had repeatedly expressed interest in a direct rail link with the provincial capital, Verona, since the Brenner line was inconvenient for them as it was located at the bottom of the Adige Valley. Thus, on May 28, 1883, a promoting committee was formed consisting of the mayors of Affi and Costermano (Giuseppe Poggi and Girolamo Giuliari, respectively) and engineers Giovanni Beccherle and Giuseppe Fraccaroli to build a railroad between the city of Verona and the slopes of Mount Baldo. The committee immediately did its best to raise the necessary funds in the project and to sensitize the neighboring municipalities, moreover, it called an assembly for this purpose on July 2, 1883, during which the benefits of the project were explained to all the mayors of the towns involved, (Note: Among the invited mayors were those of Quinzano, Parona, which are now part of the municipality of Verona, and Negarine, now under San Pietro in Cariano.) who, with the exception of the mayor of Garda, approved the project. (Note: In this regard, the report of the promoting committee can be consulted.)

Having quickly obtained the consent of the other municipalities involved, the promoting committee worked to obtain the necessary authorizations from the Ministry of Public Works and the Ministry of War: the former responded positively in a little less than a year after the request (the concession was received on July 12, 1884), while the Ministry of War gave its approval in January 1886, partly on the grounds that it was itself interested in a railway line in the direction of the Austrian border and that it could serve an Alpini barracks located in Caprino. Following these approvals, further details were finalized within a year, and on February 5, 1886, a convention was signed between the promoting committee and the government, which established a subsidy of 1,000 liras per kilometer for fifteen years and lasting ninety years. This convention was then ratified on February 11 by Royal Decree No. 3762.

In October 1886, the "Società Anonima per la Ferrovia Verona-Caprino-Garda" (FVCG) was established, with headquarters in Milan and management in Verona, in order to raise the funds for construction and operation: the company had a share capital of 2,500,000 lire and was chaired by banker Alberto Vonwiller, while Achille Levi was vice-president; among the directors were Serafini, Camis and Luzzato. The magnitude of the expenses envisaged for the construction of the work explains why it was necessary to resort to non-Veronese capital: at that time Verona was experiencing a period of economic and industrial backwardness (Note: See also Early industrialization of Verona (Italian)) and there was no entrepreneurial class capable of investing such large amounts of capital in such a work. Furthermore, the still-present "military servitudes" (Note: Since Austrian rule in the 19th century, Verona has been a border town and therefore a very important territory from a strategic point of view. The presence of garrisons and military structures heavily influenced on its development. In particular, the so-called "military servitudes" were in force: severe restrictions on building outside the city walls and prohibitions for civilians to approach military facilities and transit on particular roads.) did not favor the development of industry, as had been the case in Lombardy for some time.

The following year, expropriations were started and there was some controversy between Società Anonima and the municipality of Verona over the placement of the head station: the former wanted to place it in the gardens of Porta San Giorgio, while the latter was not willing to create problems for the inhabitants of the area and users of the postal road to Tyrol, which would be cut by the rails in those vicinities. The issue resulted in legal action, followed with interest by the local press, which led to the municipality obtaining a victory at least economically, despite which the station was placed in San Giorgio and the line between Caprino and Verona was inaugurated on August 3, 1889.

=== The inauguration ===
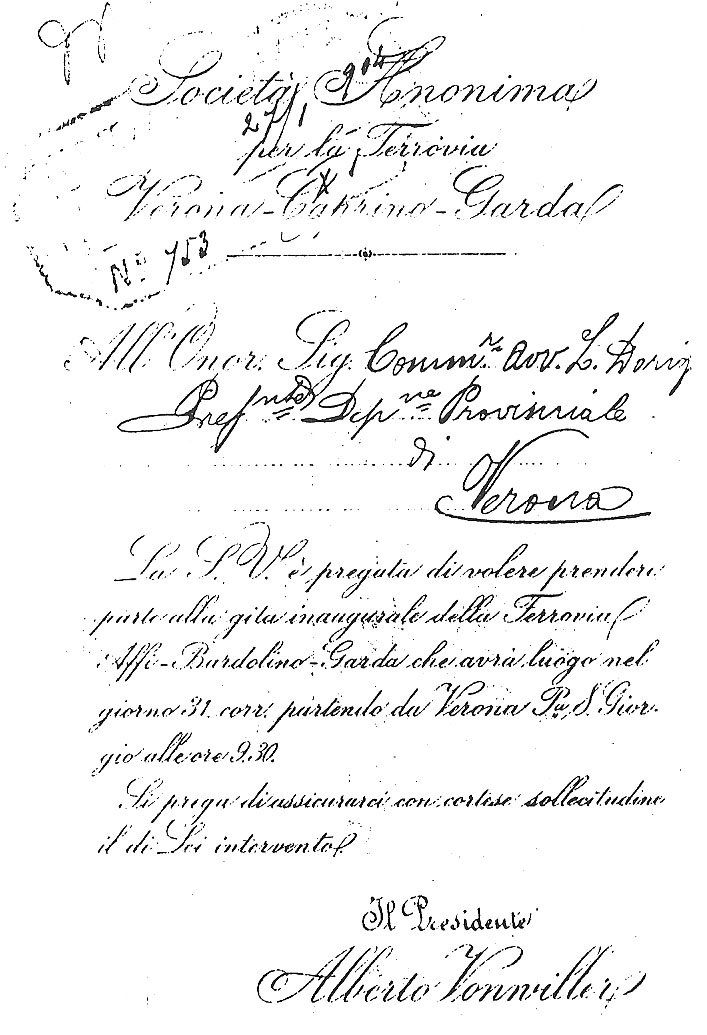
Invitation to the opening of the second Verona-Caprino section on January 31, 1904.

On August 3, 1889, six years after the founding of the promoting committee, the first section of the railway, between Verona Porta San Giorgio and Caprino Veronese, was inaugurated with a celebration attended by a large crowd and many authorities, although representatives of the municipality of Verona were absent. On its first journey the train stopped at each station, where it welcomed on board the mayor of the corresponding municipality, and on arrival in Caprino, accompanied by many people also from the mountain towns, the official lunch was held. Passenger service began the day after the inauguration: it proved very successful, partly because of the eagerness to try out the new means of transport, to such an extent that the first runs were full.

Initially, five pairs of trains passed through each day, including round trips, (Note: Increased to seven by November 1, 1893.) and the ticket cost was 3.75, 2.70 and 1.70 lire in first, second and third class, respectively. The staff was dressed in a black uniform and cap, with blue lining in which there were red or silver fillets and borders depending on duties and rank.

At a time when the automobile was a privilege of the rich, the establishment of this railway represented a radical change in the habits of the population as the time to travel from Verona to Caprino was reduced to half an hour, compared to the two hours taken by traditional means (horses and carts).

Conversely, the construction of the line to Garda, planned in the original plans, was suspended pending further subsidies. It was necessary to wait for the establishment of a new promoter committee (Note: This new committee was formed by Nicola Gaiter, retired colonel of the Royal Carabinieri.) to resolve the issue and urge the start of work: a new convention was signed with the government, which was approved by Royal Decree No. 82 of February 23, 1902. The Affi-Garda was inaugurated on January 31, 1904.

=== The railway in the early decades of the twentieth century ===
Railway line operator	Period
Società Concessionaria Anonima Commerciale	1910 to 1924
Società Veneta	1910 to 1924
Provincial Administration (sub-management by S.A.E.R. since 1935)	1924 to 1959

In 1910 the FVCG granted the railway to the Società Veneta per la Costruzione e l'Esercizio di Ferrovie Secondarie Italiane, which kept the line in operation during World War I, when due to wartime requirements civilian runs were almost suppressed in favor of military transport. However, at the end of the conflict, recovery struggled to take off, so the operating company was forced to reduce traffic to only four pairs of runs per day in the summer and three in the winter.

Due to insufficient service, in 1924, the Società Veneta no longer deemed it worthwhile to operate the line, which was therefore bought back by the province: the public corporation made several investments including the purchase of accumulator railcars built by Rognini & Balbo which made it possible to increase the number of runs, moving to operating four winter and six summer runs for the entire network, to which were added two runs to Parona and three to Domegliara; in addition, plans were made (following a resolution of December 14, 1925) to completely electrify the line, a change that was, however, never implemented due to disagreements between the Administration and the Fascist government.

The year 1925 was marked by a number of accidents that fortunately did not cause injury to passengers. On March 11, a convoy derailed near Calmasino station due to an incomplete closure of a switch, while on July 9, due to human error on the part of the shunter, some wagons ran off the tracks, creating delays on the line of several hours. Also in the same year an attempt to tamper with the line was reported to the carabinieri with the discovery of some stones placed on the tracks at the Cavaion level crossing.

However, after about ten years of direct management, the province entered a difficult phase, so it decided to hand over management to the Società Anonima Esercizi Riuniti (SAER) in June 1935, which in the following years proceeded to reorganize the rolling stock, divesting what was considered obsolete.

=== The railway during and after World War II ===
During World War II the railway was affected by a difficult situation: in addition to the chronic problems derived from the difficulty of supplying water for the boilers, it was often subjected to attacks and bombings, particularly in 1943 when the most serious episodes occurred, namely in September the death of a passenger following a machine-gun attack by a British aircraft between the Costermano and Pesina stations, and a similar assault on November 3, with an even more serious toll. Between July 1944 and April 1945, the railway was interrupted nineteen times by Anglo-American bombing, despite which restorations were always timely as the line was used by the German army for supplies. Due to the difficulty of finding means, moreover, the coal transport service between Domegliara and Caprino was also suspended for a time. Severe damage to the line's infrastructure occurred on April 25, 1945, at the end of the German occupation, when soldiers, by then on the run, undermined and blew up the Sega bridge, which was rebuilt the following year with reinforced concrete arches at an expense of 29,600,000 lire totally borne by the state.

In 1948 the SAER purchased ALn 556 railcars from the State Railways, which were used for passenger transport: the new rolling stock exposed all the limitations of the old equipment, which was incapable of sustaining increases in speed. However, new investments were needed, which the Province did not want to make, so in 1954 it was decided to close the line.

=== The end of the line ===
And the day of farewell came; a sad, gray morning in which only the slow flicker of gently falling snow seemed to want to bid him farewell.

— Germano Mosconi, in an article published in L'Arena on March 20, 1957.

In the first half of the 1950s, an economic study of Verona's public transportation was commissioned that led to the outline of a desire to abolish the line despite the many voices defending the railway. (Note: Remarkable are the campaigns by many journalists from L'Arena including historian Giuseppe Silvestri, who called for the line to be upgraded.) The detractors presented the following arguments:

- it was argued that the rolling stock was mostly obsolete also due to the failure to electrify the line;
- the route of the train, with its numerous level crossings, was creating problems for the car traffic that was becoming more and more intense;
- the overall costs of operation, and particularly for the personnel employed, far exceeded revenues, putting the budgets of the Provincial Administration in crisis.

The Garda-Affi section was the first to be decommissioned, in July 1956, followed by the Caprino-Domegliara, in December 1956; for the Verona-Domegliara section, transformation into a trolleybus was planned, which would run along the new Valpolicella road. This transformation was approved by Ministerial Decree No. 3451 of November 30, 1955, which concretized the provisions of Law No. 1221 of August 5, 1952.

The last railway run was carried out on April 30, 1959.

== Features ==
=== Infrastructure ===
The railway line was single track, reinforced with 1435 mm ordinary gauge Vignoles rails. The total length of the line was 45.404 km, including 34.109 of the Caprino-Verona and 11.295 of the Affi-Garda branch line.

=== Route ===
==== Verona Porta San Giorgio-Caprino ====
The city terminus of the railway was located at San Giorgio, near the church of the same name, from where, starting in 1893, the center of Verona could be reached by a horse-drawn omnibus service established by brothers Carlo and Giuseppe Carlini of Villafranca. After the first ten or so meters downhill, the railway route continued on roadbed in today's Via Mameli. Leaving the town, the railway line headed towards Parona, passing through two close tunnels with a total length of 400 m just before reaching the town.

After passing Parona it arrived, after passing through the village of Arbizzano, in the hamlet of Santa Maria di Negrar, and then the next stop was in the center of Pedemonte, near the parish church. After facing a curve to the right, the train passed through San Floriano, whose stop was located near the parish church of the same name, where it also served the inhabitants of the municipality of Marano di Valpolicella. It then came to the main town at San Pietro in Cariano and then transited from Domegliara, in the municipality of Sant'Ambrogio di Valpolicella, whose stop was one of the most important on the line as there was a train station on the Brenner line.

Beyond the Brenner state highway, the railway reached, with a route almost entirely laid in trenches, the village of Ponton, where the Adige River was crossed by means of a dedicated bridge. Having crossed the Adige, the train continued past the station of Sega, climbing a slope that reached a maximum gradient of 25 ‰: it thus arrived at the station of Affi, from which the line to Garda branched off in the opposite direction. From Affi the railway route was replaced on the same trackbed by Provincial Road 9 and, passing through Albarè, reached the Costermano station. From this station, located in the middle of a tight radius curve, the line turned to the right, grafting onto a straight, almost four-kilometer-long track at the end of which was the Caprino Veronese station. It represented the logistical base of the railway as the goods shed, railway workshop, loading docks, tracks for sheltering vehicles and the repair shop were located there.

On some old topographic maps one can find traces of a project of the extension of the line to Ferrara di Monte Baldo to be built, for some sections, by rack and pinion.

==== Affi-Garda ====
Leaving the Affi station, the line route passed the present sports facilities area of Affi and, shortly after, a small bridge over a ditch. The route of the line corresponds to that of Provincial Road 9 as far as the village of Cavaion.

The first station was the station of the same name, the facilities of which are located in Via Fracastoro, at a point on the line placed on a slight curve to the left. Following the decommissioning of the line, the station's passenger building was converted into a Senior Center.

Coming out in the direction of Garda, after the intersection with Via San Faustino the line's route corresponds to that of Provincial Road 31, for the construction of which the decommissioned railroad bed was used. The line, after a curve and a reverse curve, reached the culmination of the branch line to Garda at which the Calmasino stop was located, in the middle of a tight radius curve as in the case of Costermano.

From this structure, the railway traveled a section full of curves necessary to descend in elevation from the morainic plateau toward Lake Garda that corresponds to that of provincial road 31 until the intersection with Campazzi road near Bardolino. At this point, the route moves away from the provincial road by making a right turn and then crosses the provincial road again at the traffic circle with Via Europa Unita. The route of the latter road and that of via Ugo Foscolo correspond to that of the decommissioned line.

Once the line reached the lake, the first station encountered was Bardolino, located in Piazzale Gramsci. Following the decommissioning of the line, its passenger building was reused as the site of a recreational club for the elderly.

After Bardolino, the railway continued for three kilometers along what is now the Rivalunga promenade, on a level track, until it reached the terminus at Garda, located at the Europa lakefront. The passenger building was located to the side of the tracks along Via San Francesco; following the decommissioning of the railway it was demolished.

Garda derived many benefits from the arrival of the railway: while in the late 19th century the economy of the place was mainly based on fishing, the end of its isolation led to the start of tourist and commercial activities.

== Rolling stock ==
For the first years of operation, the Verona-Caprino-Garda Railway Limited Company relied on steam locomotives made by Krauss and Henschel. With the exception of the first locomotive purchased, which was sold in 1916, the others were scrapped in 1959. The fleet of passenger coaches, with double-axle cars, consisted of the following:

- eight first and second-class cars;
- thirteen third-class cars;
- three mixed third-class and baggage cars;
- two baggage cars.

In contrast, the freight car fleet, also with double axles, consisted of a total of forty-four wagons, of which fifteen were suitable for international service (five uncovered and ten uncovered), twenty-five uncovered wagons with tailgates, and four wagons dedicated to livestock transport.

At the time of the handover of management to the provincial administration, the equipment used on the line consisted of six steam locomotives, twenty-seven two-axle passenger coaches and forty-one freight cars. During that era, a program of modernization of the line was initiated: in 1925, five electric accumulator railcars manufactured by the Rognini and Balbo firm were purchased in order to achieve the goal of making more runs at a lower cost; (Note: The cost of electricity was lower than that of steam.) in addition, nine carriages and seventeen freight cars were purchased, while seventeen passenger cars were decommissioned. This resulted, therefore, in the following rolling stock:

- six steam locomotives;
- five electric accumulator engines;
- nineteen passenger cars, including five bogie cars and fourteen two-axle cars;
- fifty-eight freight cars.

Also in 1925, an accumulator engine was diverted from the San Bonifacio-Lonigo-Cologna Veneta tramway to be assigned to the Verona-Caprino.

Dieselization, at least for passenger service, was implemented after the war, when SAER, in 1948, purchased from the State Railways four ALn 556 railcars that were repaired by Breda: these were the last vehicles to enter service on the line. At its closure, the rolling stock consisted of the following:

- six steam locomotives;
- two electric accumulator railcars;
- four diesel railcars;
- fifteen passenger cars, including five bogie cars and ten two-axle cars;
- thirty-four freight cars, fourteen of which were closed and the remaining twenty open.

=== Tractive stock used ===
Manufacturer and serial no.	Service number	Construction year	Entry into service	Divestiture
Steam locomotives
Henschel 2728	1 (SV 210)	1889	1889	Demolished in 1959
Henschel 2729	2 (SV 211)	1889	1889	Demolished in 1959
Henschel 2730	3 (SV 212)	1889	1889	Demolished in 1959
Krauss 2164	4 (SV 200)	1899	1899	Sold in 1916
Henschel 3157	5 (SV 213)	1890	1890	Demolished in 1959
Henschel 3158	6 (SV 214)	1890	1890	Demolished in 1959
Henschel 7494	7 (SV 215)	1906	1906	Demolished in 1959
Accumulator engines
Rognini e Balbo	A 41	1924	1924	Demolished in 1959
Rognini e Balbo	A 42	1924	1924	Demolished in 1959
Rognini e Balbo	A 43	1924	1924	Demolished in 1959
Rognini e Balbo	A 75 (Note: They were often interchanged with their motor counterparts used on the Verona - San Bonifacio - Cologna Veneta tramways.)	1925	1925	Demolished in 1959
Rognini e Balbo	A 78	1925	1925	Demolished in 1959
Diesel-powered railcars (Note: All Diesel railcars were purchased by the State Railways in 1947.)
Breda	AD 301 (former FS ALn 56.2020)	1937	1948	Sold in 1959 (Note: Sold to a wrecker and later purchased by La Ferroviaria Italiana in 1963.)
Breda	AD 302 (former FS ALn 556.2224)	1938	1948	Sold in 1959
Breda	AD 303 (former FS ALn 56.2034)	1937	1948	Sold in 1959
Breda	AD 304 (former FS ALn 556.2281)	1939	1948	Sold in 1959

== See also ==
- Verona
- Affi
- Caprino
- Garda

== Bibliography ==
- Giorgio Chiericato; Roberto Rigato (1993). Un vecchio trenino. La ferrovia Verona-Caprino-Garda. Verona: Civiltà Veronese Progetti.
- Giovanni Cornolò (2005). La Società Veneta Ferrovie (2 ed.). Ponte San Nicolò: Duegi.
- Fabbio Gaggia (2017). Quel treno per Garda. Caselle di Sommacampagna: Cierre.
- Giancarlo Ganzerla (2004). Binari sul Garda - Dalla Ferdinandea al tram: tra cronaca e storia. Brescia: Grafo.
- Pier Giorgio Puppini (April 2005). "Ferrotranvie Veronesi". Tutto Treno & Storia (13). Ponte San Nicolò: Duegi.
