= Turin–Saluzzo/Carmagnola Tramway =

Tramway line in Piedmont, Italy, 1881–1950

Torino–Saluzzo tramway
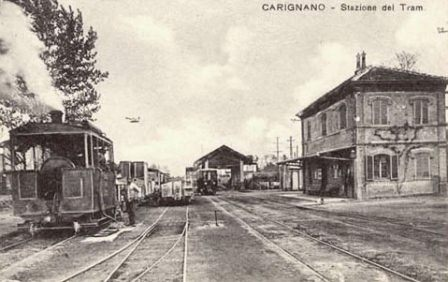
- Carignano station

Overview
- Locale: Piedmont, Italy
- Transit type: Interurban tramway

Operation
- Began operation: 1881 (Torino–Moretta/Carmagnola); 1882 (Moretta–Saluzzo)
- Ended operation: 1948 (Pilone Virle–Carmagnola); 1950 (Torino–Saluzzo)
- Operator: SATIP
- Number of vehicles: Steam tram locomotives and trailers; accumulator railcars (1925–1950)

Technical
- System length: 61.528 km
- Track gauge: 1,100 mm (3 ft 7 5/16 in)

The Torino–Saluzzo tramway, with the Pilone Virle–Carmagnola branch, was an interurban tramway line that connected the cities of Turin, Saluzzo and Carmagnola in Piedmont, Italy from 1881 to 1950.

== History ==
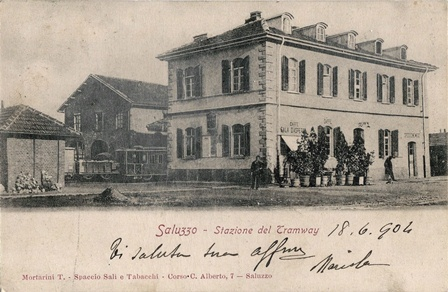
Saluzzo tram station

The first steps toward the construction of a tramway network in the Saluzzo area were taken in July 1877, when an assembly of interested municipalities, deputies, and provincial councillors resolved to promote the construction of a railway between Airasca, Saluzzo, Cuneo and Mondovì with a branch from Busca to Dronero. Shortly after, the French banker Alfonso Raoul Berrier-Delaleu applied for the concession of the tramway lines Cuneo–Dronero, Cuneo–Busca–Saluzzo, Cuneo–Mondovì, and Saluzzo–Moretta–Pancalieri (the last extendable to Turin): on 29 October 1877 the Provincial Council of Cuneo accepted the application, granting on the following 4 November the construction and operation of the Cuneo–Dronero and Cuneo–Busca–Saluzzo tramways. The Cuneo–Dronero tramway opened on 23 November 1879, and on 24 October 1880 it was the turn of the Saluzzo–Cuneo tramway.

Also in 1880, engineer Giuseppe Bonelli, representing the Belgian banker Rodolfo Coumond, submitted to the Provincial Deputation of Turin a request for the concession of the Turin–Carignano–Carmagnola and Turin–Carignano–Moretta–Saluzzo lines. Authorisation for the construction of the Turin–Carmagnola section was obtained in February 1881. On 26 October of the same year, the Turin–Moretta and Carignano–Carmagnola sections were opened. (Note: Molino (1981), p. 121, indicates the opening date of the Turin–Carmagnola section as 14 August 1881, while for Carignano–Moretta it was 9 October.) The first timetable provided for five pairs of services between Turin (piazza Nizza) and Moretta and six pairs of services on the Carignano–Carmagnola branch, connecting with the main line.

On 25 July 1882, the section from Moretta to Saluzzo was opened, connecting the line with the tramways to Cuneo, Dronero and Borgo San Dalmazzo: six pairs of daily services were scheduled on the entire route.

1901 timetable

The lines were operated by the Compagnie Générale des Tramways à Vapeur Piémontais (CGTVP), directed by Coumond, which in 1882 took over from Berrier-Delaleu—who was in financial difficulty due to the construction of the Asti–Cortanze and Asti–Canale tramways—the concessions for the Cuneo–Saluzzo, Cuneo–Dronero, Pinerolo–Cavour and Saluzzo–Revello lines. With the absorption of Berrier-Delaleu's lines, the Compagnia Generale dei Tramways Piemontesi (CGTP) was established, based in Brussels, which until the First World War expanded its network to a total length of 189.965 km. Between 1903 and 1907 the company declared a profit equal to 32% of operating revenue, the highest among all Piedmontese tramways.

After the First World War, the CGTP, in order to reduce operating costs (labour, fuel, maintenance) and increase speeds in the second half of the 1920s, experimented with a benzole railcar, later turning to the use of accumulator electric railcars on the initiative of the managing director, Dr. Pietro Lo Balbo. Accumulator traction, employed in those years also on various Italian tramways and railways (San Bonifacio–Lonigo–Cologna Veneta, Verona–Caprino–Garda, Udine–San Daniele, the Parma and Mantua interurban tramways), was also favoured by the government: Article 35 of Royal Decree Law No. 2150 of 2 August 1929 granted per-kilometre subsidies of up to 10,000 lire for 35 years. From December 1925, two two-axle accumulator railcars were tested on the Turin–Carmagnola line with good public success, prompting the CGTP to build additional units and to purchase larger bogie railcars for the Turin–Saluzzo–Cuneo line, which entered service on Sunday 2 November 1930.

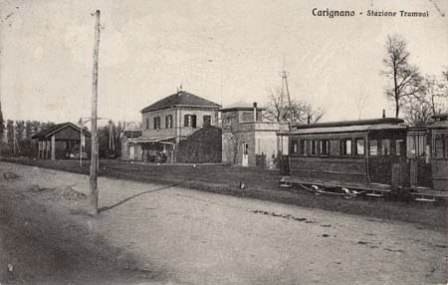
Train at Carignano in 1920

With the electric railcars, the service improved, but it was not enough to counter the advance of bus lines: on 1 May 1935, part of the network, with low traffic or difficult profiles, was converted into bus lines entrusted to the Società Anonima Autolinee Piemontesi, an associate company of the CGTP. The following year the CGTP's capital passed into Italian hands; the company changed its name to Società Anonima Tramvie Interprovinciali Piemontesi (SATIP), with headquarters in Turin and operating management in Saluzzo.

During the Second World War, one bogie railcar, six two-axle trailers, thirteen high-sided wagons, and twenty covered wagons were seriously damaged; the Turin depot in Corso Spezia was also bombed and severely damaged, and the branch to Carmagnola was interrupted, reopening at the end of 1946. The conflict heavily engaged SATIP, especially regarding the transport of displaced persons.

Despite various projects for the reconstruction of the SATIP network proposed by various public and private entities, some of which envisaged route variations on a reserved track, electrification (or dieselisation), and conversion to standard gauge, on 30 November 1948 the sections Pilone Virle–Carmagnola, Saluzzo–Cuneo, Cuneo–Dronero, and Costigliole–Venasca were closed and replaced by buses. After protests from users, only the Turin–Saluzzo line remained active, which closed on 10 April 1950, replaced by buses of the Nuova SATIP, the new name for SATIP.

== Characteristics ==
The tramway line was a narrow-gauge railway with a track gauge of 1100 mm, and developed for 61.528 km, of which 7.518 km was the branch to Carmagnola; the minimum curve radius was 50 metres, and the maximum gradient was 20 per thousand. The maximum permitted speed was 36 km/h, reduced to 24 km/h on the Pilone Virle–Carmagnola section.

Up to the Millefonti stop, the route was double-tracked, shared with the Turin tram network; due to the different gauge, it shared only one of the two rails.

=== Route ===
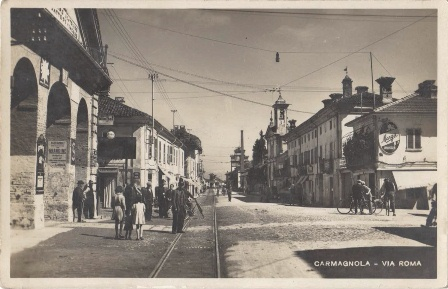
Track in Carmagnola, in via Roma

The line started from piazza Nizza in Turin, passing through the Nizza barrier and the Lingotto (for which the "Saluzzo train" was the only connection with Turin until 1911).

Leaving Turin, the line entered the state road for Saluzzo, touching Moncalieri, La Loggia and entering Carignano, where it stopped in piazza Carlo Alberto. At the intersection of the roads for Saluzzo and Carmagnola stood the Pilone Virle station, from which the branch for Carmagnola diverged.

Arriving at Saluzzo, the line stopped in piazza Denina, before ending its run at Porta Cuneo.

In 1926, the Turin terminus was moved back from Corso Vittorio Emanuele to piazza Nizza; in 1944 it was further moved back to the Nizza barrier and, in the last periods of operation, to piazza Bengasi.

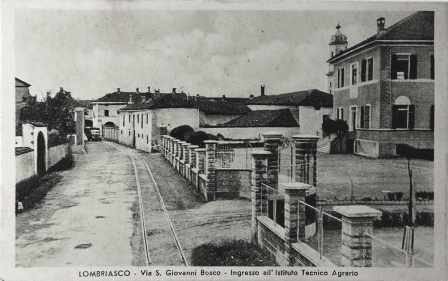
Track in Lombriasco

At Saluzzo, the station (connected to the railway) was located in piazza XX Settembre; after the tramway's closure, it was used as a bus station for SATIP bus lines; partially modified in the following years, it closed in 1977, replaced by the new bus station in via Circonvallazione, and was later demolished: some apartment buildings were built in its place.

The line had several freight sidings:

- at Moncalieri to the National Tannin Extract Factory;
- at Saluzzo to the Pellini Albonico brickworks;
- at Turin to the Pietro Sicco transport company.

== Rolling stock ==
=== Railcars ===
The tramway was initially served by Henschel & Sohn steam locomotives and carriages built by Grondona. With the acquisition of Berrier-Delaleu's lines, the CGTP rolling stock also included the eight locomotives built by SLM for the Cuneo–Dronero and Cuneo–Saluzzo lines, withdrawn by 1920, and a Hagans locomotive; both types were two-axled.

They were followed by other tramway locomotives, built by Krauss and Henschel, delivered up to 1909, in addition to two built by Breda; two Borsig locomotives were purchased from the Pinerolo–Perosa Argentina tramway. The CGTP fleet would eventually total 40 locomotives.

In 1925, the CGTP ordered a DWK Type IV railcar from Romeo for its own network, on which it served for about a decade, with poor results.

Shortly after, accumulator traction was experimented with, already tested on other Italian tram lines: the Officine di Savigliano built two railcars on the frames of two-axle Grondona carriages, powered by two 13 hp motors each: these electric railcars gave good results, reducing travel times by 30%. A further series of four railcars was subsequently built, two built by the Savigliano workshops and two by the CGTP workshops based on carriages, powered by two motors for a total of 40 hp.

The experiment was successful, and the CGTP ordered three bogie railcars in 1929, built by Carminati e Toselli with electrical equipment from TIBB, in service from 1930; three more were delivered in 1933.

=== Carriages and freight wagons ===
The first carriages were supplied by Locati of Turin (no more than 12 units, two-axle with open end platforms); subsequently Grondona supplied about sixty carriages, also two-axle with open platforms but more comfortable. The Locati carriages were withdrawn between 1910 and 1920; in those years, the Officine Meccaniche di Pinerolo supplied 28 carriages with closed vestibules (four mixed first and second class, the others second class), longer than the previous ones and used mainly on the Turin–Carmagnola, Turin–Saluzzo–Cuneo and Cuneo–Dronero lines; in addition, part of the Grondona carriages were converted to closed platforms. In the early 1930s, two two-axle carriages with open platforms arrived from the Messina–Barcellona Pozzo di Gotto tramway, whose shareholders were the same as the CGTP, but they never entered service.

In 1930, about 400 freight wagons were in service, of which 60 were covered and 45 had low sides.

=== Motive power summary ===
Unit	Year built	Builder	Type	Notes
1÷5	1879–1880	SLM	2-axle locomotive	ex Berrier-Delaleu for Cuneo–Dronero
1÷3	1879–1880	SLM	2-axle locomotive	ex Berrier-Delaleu for Saluzzo–Cuneo
4	1881	Hagans		ex Berrier-Delaleu
5÷7	1881	Krauss	2-axle	built for Pinerolo–Cavour
10÷17	1881	Henschel	2-axle	
18	1909	Henschel	2-axle	
19÷27	1882	Henschel	2-axle	
28÷35	1888	Henschel	2-axle	
36÷38	1907	Henschel	2-axle	
1÷2		Breda		
1÷2		Borsig		ex Pinerolo–Perosa Argentina
51, 57	1925	SNOS	2-axle accumulator railcars	built for Turin–Carmagnola
3÷4	1927	SNOS	2-axle accumulator railcars	built for Saluzzo–Revello–Paesana, Revello–Barge, Costigliole–Venasca
5÷6	1927	SNOS	2-axle accumulator railcars	built for Saluzzo–Revello–Paesana, Revello–Barge, Costigliole–Venasca
101÷106	1929–1932	C&T-TIBB	Bogie accumulator railcars	built for Turin–Saluzzo–Cuneo, Cuneo–Dronero, Cuneo–Boves

== See also ==
- Trams in Turin
- Saluzzo–Cuneo tramway
- Saluzzo–Pinerolo tramway
- Saluzzo–Revello–Paesana tramway
- Asti–Cortanze Tramway
- Asti–Canale Tramway

== Bibliography ==
- Brogiato, Giovanni (1977). "Le tramvie extraurbane in Piemonte 1875–1914" [The interurban tramways in Piedmont 1875–1914]. Cronache Economiche – Rivista della Camera di Commercio Industria Artigianato e Agricoltura di Torino (in Italian) (1–2): 55–63.
- Gambino, Leonardo (1987). Il Lingotto una volta [Lingotto once upon a time] (in Italian). Turin: Città di Torino – Circoscrizione 9.
- Governato, Mario (2016). C'era una volta il tram. Tranvie intercomunali di Torino nelle immagini d'epoca 1880–1950 [Once upon a time there was the tram. Turin inter-municipal tramways in period images 1880–1950] (in Italian). Turin: Edizioni del Capricorno. ISBN 978-88-7707-274-0.
- Grosso, Giuseppe (2 August 1981). "Quel trenino che a Saluzzo da trent'anni non arriva più" [That little train that hasn't arrived in Saluzzo for thirty years]. La Stampa – Cuneo e Provincia (in Italian). p. 1.
- Molino, Domenico (October 1979). "Le prime automotrici FS" [The first FS railcars]. Italmodel Ferrovie (in Italian) (231). Verona: Modeltecnica: 21.
- Molino, Nico (1981). Il trenino di Saluzzo. Storia della Compagnia Generale Tramways Piemontesi [The little train of Saluzzo. History of the Compagnia Generale Tramways Piemontesi] (in Italian). Turin: Immagini e Parole.
- Ogliari, Francesco; Sapi, Franco (1968). Scintille tra i monti. Storia dei trasporti italiani vol. 8 e 9. Piemonte–Valle d'Aosta [Sparks among the mountains. History of Italian transport vols. 8 and 9. Piedmont–Aosta Valley] (in Italian). Milan: Self-published.
- Orario generale Ferrovie dello Stato e secondarie – Tranvie – Servizi lacuali ed automobilistici – Navigazione marittima – Linee aeree [General timetable of State and secondary railways – Tramways – Lake and motor services – Maritime navigation – Air lines] (in Italian). Turin: Fratelli Pozzo Editori. July 1939. p. 363.
