= Skirmish of Pastrengo (1848) =

Coordinates: 45°29′22″N 10°48′36″E

Battle of Pastrengo
- Part of the First Italian War of Independence
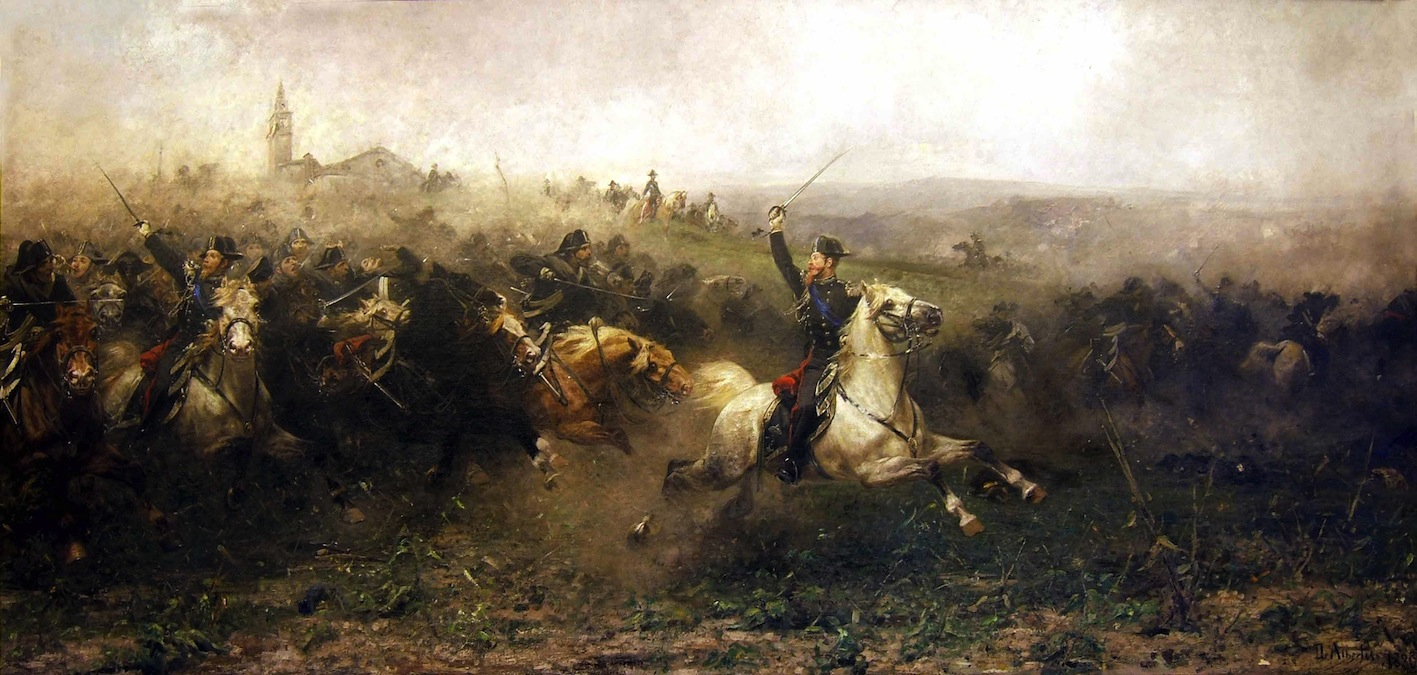
- The charge of the carabinieri at Pastrengo by Sebastiano De Albertis
Date	30 April 1848
Location	Pastrengo, Lombardy–Venetia
Result	Sardinian victory

Belligerents
Kingdom of Sardinia	Austrian Empire

Commanders and leaders
Charles Albert; General Broglia	Marshal Wocher; Hauptmann Nagel †

Strength
13,700 engaged	5,900 well-entrenched posts

Casualties and losses
15 killed 90 wounded (Note: Approximately 150, according to Michael Embree's Radetzky's Marches: The Campaigns of 1848 and 1849 in Upper Italy. Colonel Wehrlin states that his regiment lost 3 killed and 38 wounded on 28 April, more than the loss provided by General Bes on 28 April and the 3rd Battalion of the 1st Regiment had three killed and 21 wounded on the 29th. For the three days, including the related skirmishes, the loss is likely to be around 150.)	25 killed 147 wounded 341 captured 42 missing

The Skirmish of Pastrengo, also known as Battle of Pastrengo or Charge of Pastrengo, was fought between the Piedmontese and Austrian army on 30 April 1848, in the course of the First Italian War of Independence. The engagement is mostly remembered for the cavalry charge of the Carabinieri, depicted in numerous Italian artworks.

== Prelude ==
The Austrian forces were deployed in a way that threatened any Piedmontese attack against the fortress of Peschiera del Garda, and against Verona. Therefore, the Piedmontese High Command decided to act energetically against it to neutralize this threat, with the II Corps (commanded by General Ettore Gerbaix De Sonnaz), supported by the reserve division.

Although some sources claimed that the troops of the Kingdom of Sardinia were for the most part volunteers from regions of northern Italy, in fact those consisted of four brigades of the Piedmontese regular army. Among the troops at Pastrengo, there were recorded, 1,000 volunteers from Parma, 150 volunteers from Piacenza and 400 students from Pavia and Turin.

== The Battle ==
On the right the brigade "Savoia" proceeded slowly, hampered by the unknown terrain; on the centre and right the brigades "Cuneo" and "Piemonte" met with better success, and after three hours at 14:00 the Piedmontese line began to advance. Despite attempts by the Austrian commander to delay it, the offensive proceeded up to the pontoon bridge on the river Adige. After this success, however, the Piedmontese stopped and did not advance further.

As documented by the New monthly magazine: Vol. 83, 1848:

"On the 30th of April, what is called in the bulletin issued from the headquarters of the Sardinian army, "the first battle between the two armies of Italy," was fought. The end proposed was to occupy Bussolengo, Pastrengo, and Piovezzana, and to attempt to force the Adige. The affair commenced at half-past eleven, A.m. The Italian troops succeeded in driving the Austrians from all the positions which they occupied at Pastrengo, and in gaining the heights which command the Adige."

== Aftermath ==
While a Piedmontese victory, it was not a complete success, since Field Marshal Radetzky still had full use of the vital road that connected him to Trento and the Empire; had this been cut, the Austrian situation would have become critical.

As documented by the New monthly magazine: Vol. 83, 1848:

"During the night of the 30th, Bussolengo was taken by the Sardinians, and the passage of the Adige effected at Pontone."

== Sources ==
- Pieri, Piero (1962). Storia militare del Risorgimento: guerre e insurrezioni. Torino: Giulio Einaudi.
