= Parrocchia Esaltazione della Santa Croce, Pastrengo =

Building in Pastrengo, Italy

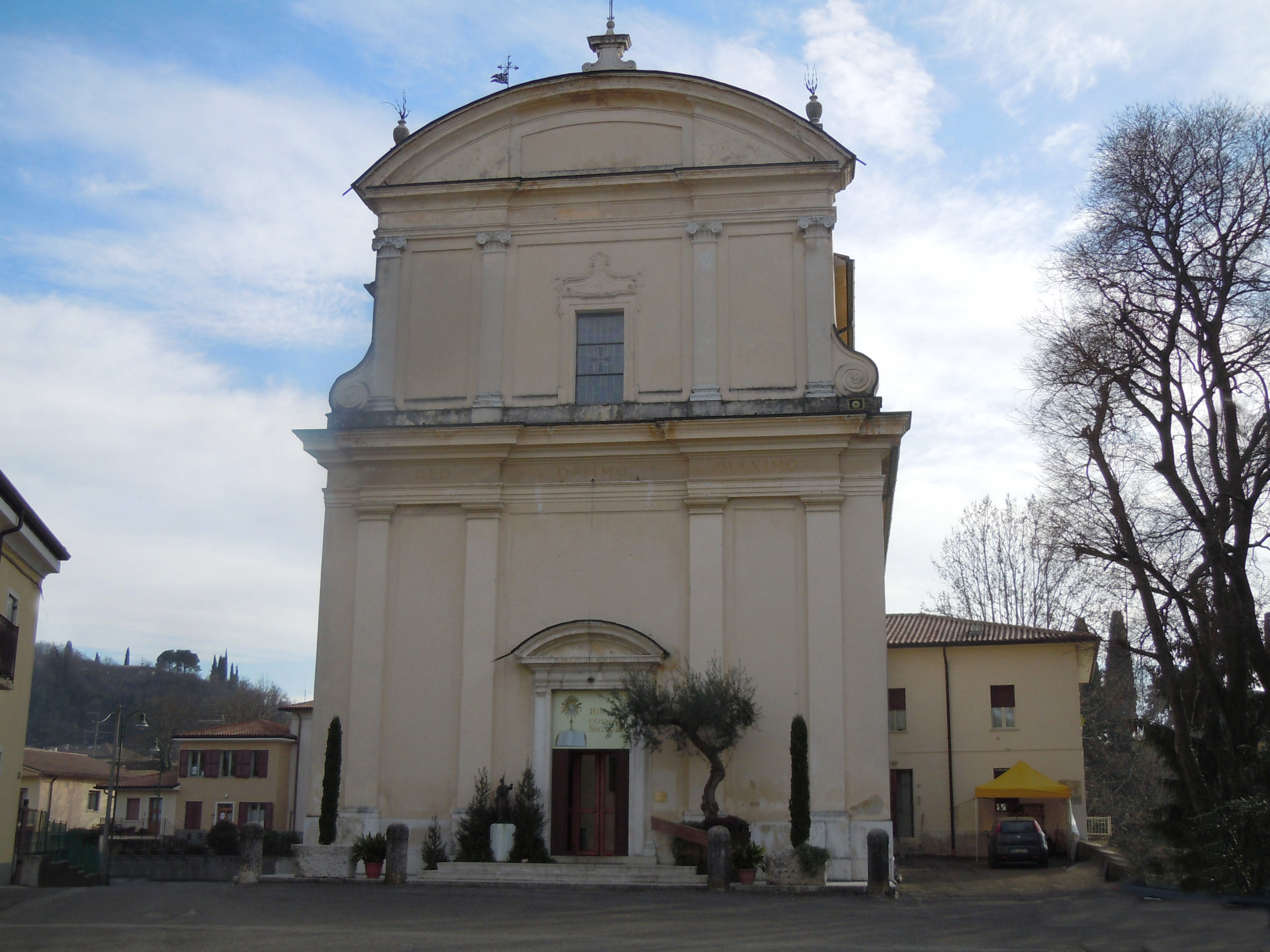

The church of the Exaltation of the Holy Cross or Esaltazione della Santa Croce is a Roman Catholic parish church, located in Pastrengo, province of Verona, region of Veneto, Italy.

== History ==
The present church was erected in 1757 to replace an older church. The main altar (1788), made of polychrome marble, shelters the main oil canvas altarpiece depicting Saint Helen adoring the Cross by Francesco Lorenzi. This painting is flanked by canvases: Christ and the Aldulterous Woman (17th-century) attributed to Lonardi, and a Susannah and the Elders before the Judges (18th-century). In the presbytery are two altarpieces (1726): one depicting the Discovery of the Cross and the other, the Sign of the Cross appears to Constantine.
