= Pastrengo =

- Comune
- Comune di Pastrengo
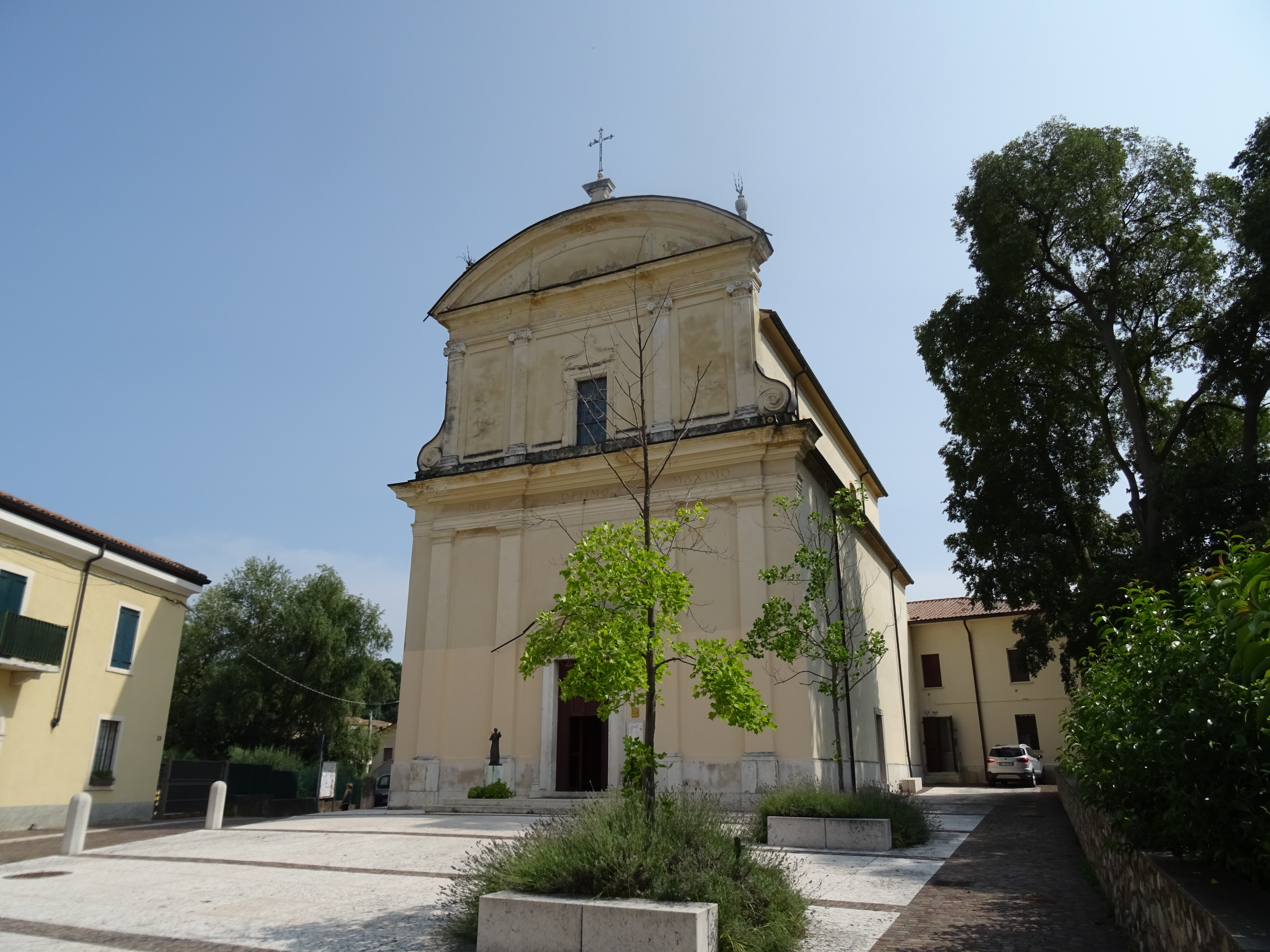
- Esaltazione della Santa Croce church

- Location within Italy Location within Veneto
- Coordinates: 45°30′N 10°48′E
- Country: Italy
- Region: Veneto
- Province: Province of Verona (VR)
- Frazioni: Piovezzano

Area
  - Total: 9.0 km^{2} (3.5 sq mi)
- Elevation: 192 m (630 ft)

Population (Dec. 2004)
  - Total: 2,486
  - Density: 280/km^{2} (720/sq mi)
- Demonym: Pastrenghesi
- Time zone: UTC+1 (CET)
  - Summer (DST): UTC+2 (CEST)
- Postal code: 37010
- Dialing code: 045

Pastrengo is a comune (municipality) in the Province of Verona in the Italian region Veneto, located about 120 kilometres (75 mi) west of Venice and about 15 kilometres (9 mi) northwest of Verona. As of 31 December 2004, it had a population of 2,486 and an area of 9.0 square kilometres (3.5 mi^{2}).

The municipality of Pastrengo contains the frazione (subdivision) Piovezzano.

Pastrengo borders the following municipalities: Bardolino, Bussolengo, Cavaion Veronese, Lazise, Pescantina, and Sant'Ambrogio di Valpolicella.

Pastrengo is known for the Battle of Pastrengo which was fought between the Piedmontese and Austrian armies on 30 April 1848, in the course of the First Italian War of Independence.

The local parish church is the Parrocchia Esaltazione della Santa Croce.

== Demographic evolution ==
Historical population

Year	Pop.	±%
1861	?	—
1871	1,335	—
1881	1,310	−1.9%
1901	1,468	+12.1%
1911	1,515	+3.2%

Year	Pop.	±%
1921	1,619	+6.9%
1931	1,795	+10.9%
1936	1,687	−6.0%
1951	1,867	+10.7%
1961	1,745	−6.5%

Year	Pop.	±%
1971	1,880	+7.7%
1981	2,055	+9.3%
1991	2,320	+12.9%
2001	2,362	+1.8%

Source: Data from ISTAT
