= San Nicolò e San Severo, Bardolino =

Church building in Bardolino, Italy

Coordinates: 45.5476°N 10.7213°E

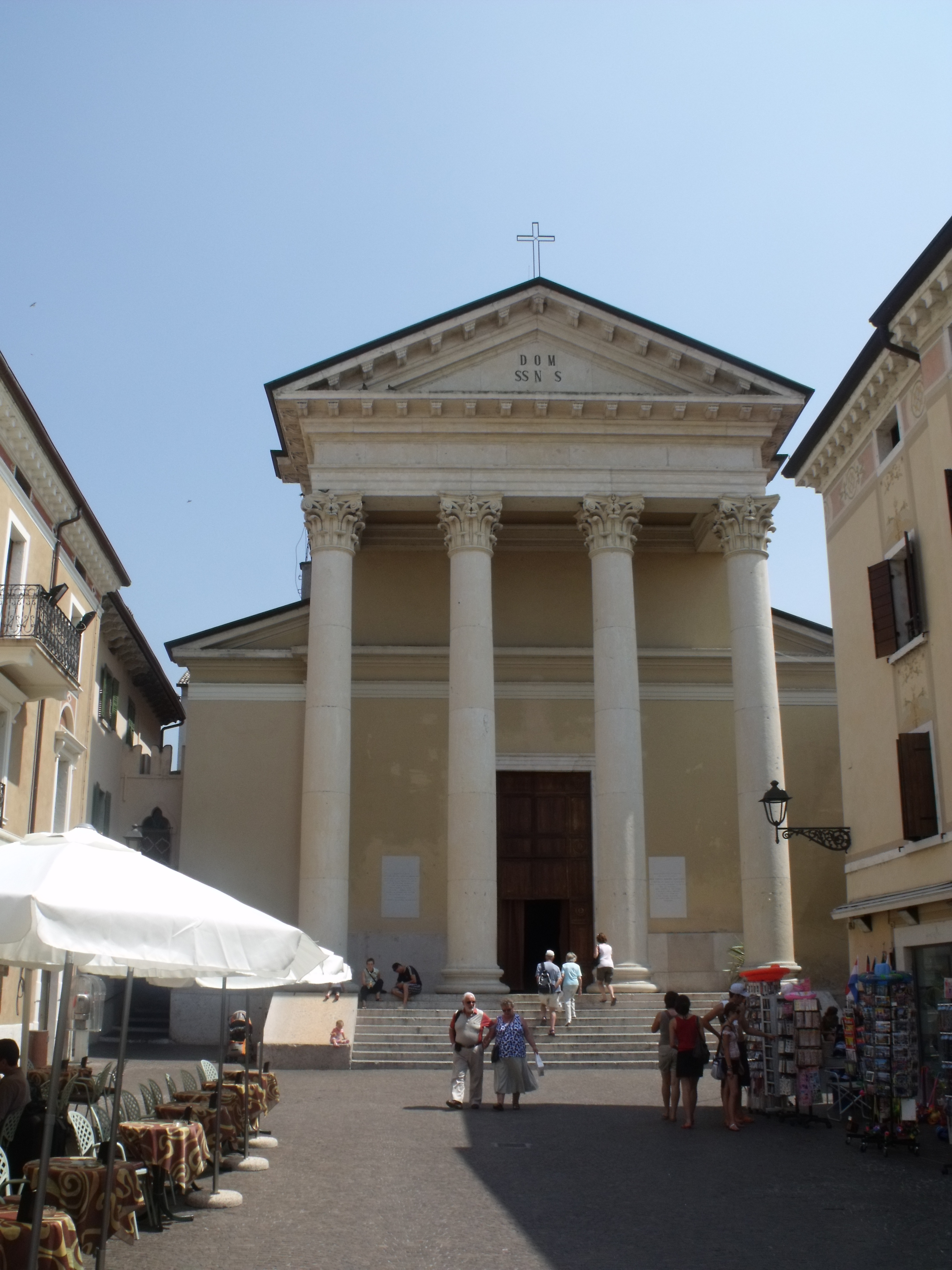
Façade of the Church of San Nicolò and San Severo

The Church of San Nicolò and San Severo is the Latin Church parish church of the Catholic Church in Bardolino, a small comune located at the Lake Garda in the Province of Verona, Italy. Its architecture is of a neoclassical construction.

== History ==
The church was built in the years 1830-1844 by the architect Bartolomeo Giuliari as a neoclassical temple, replacing the original small church of St Nicolò (13th century). The façade was finished in 1880. It has a monumental porch with four Corinthian columns.

The interior has the form of a Latin cross with the transept covered by barrel vaults and the cross vault is covered by a lowered dome. The walls are covered by semi-columns, friezes and cornices of various styles.

The high altar in the apse is formed by a marble mensa with a tabernacle and flanked on each side by a statue of a kneeling angel. The half-dome above the altar was decorated by Giovanni Bevilacqua (early 1900s), and the fresco represents Christ triumphing over Paganism with the inscription "Vicit Leo de Tribu Iuda" (Book of Revelation 5:5).

When entering the church, one finds on the right the baptistery. The marble baptismal font came originally from the church of St Nicolò. The stained-glass window shows the Baptism of Christ by John the Baptist.

The semi-octagonal, wooden pulpit stands on the left in the center of the nave.

The pendentives of the lowered dome are decorated with images of the Doctors of the Church St Jerome, St Gregory the Great, St Ambrose and St Augustine, also by Giovanni Bevilacqua.

The lunette in the counter-façade represents the Sacred Conversation with saints, with churches or chapels in Bardolino, at the feet of Our Lady. This fresco was painted by the Bardolino artist Cesco Romeo Loro (1934).

The altars in the transept are dedicated to "Our Lady of the Rosary" and to St. Joseph.

Between the pilasters in the upper niches one can see a number of statues of saints: St John the Baptist, St Zeno, St Dominic, the king Louis IX of France, the abbot St Anthony, St Severo, St Nicolò, St. Rocco, St Bernard, St Vincent Ferrer and St Umberto.

The polychrome stained-glass windows depict scenes from the Gospels and the Old Testament.

The Stations of the Cross are the work of Giovanni Battista Marcola (1757).

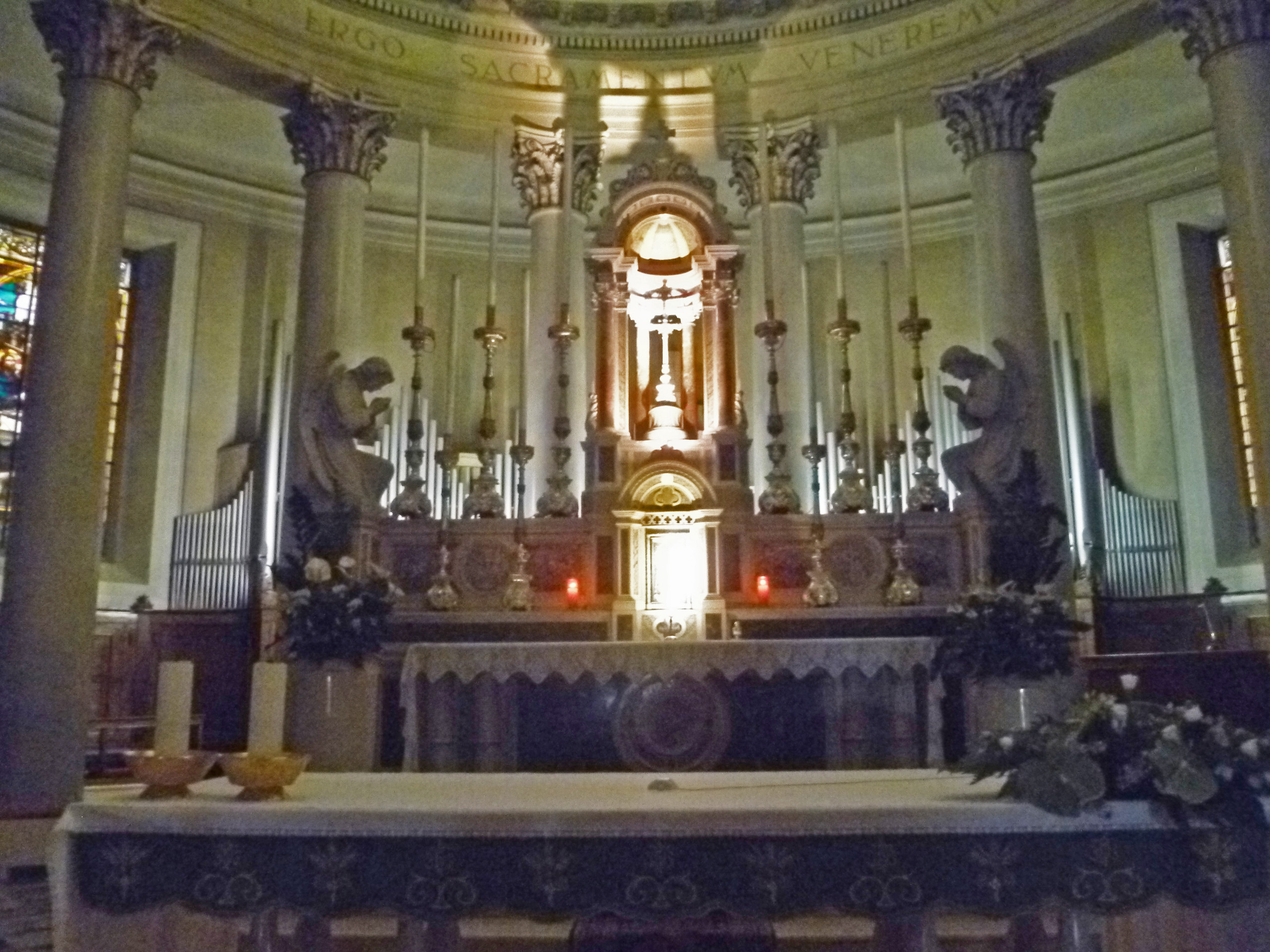
High altar

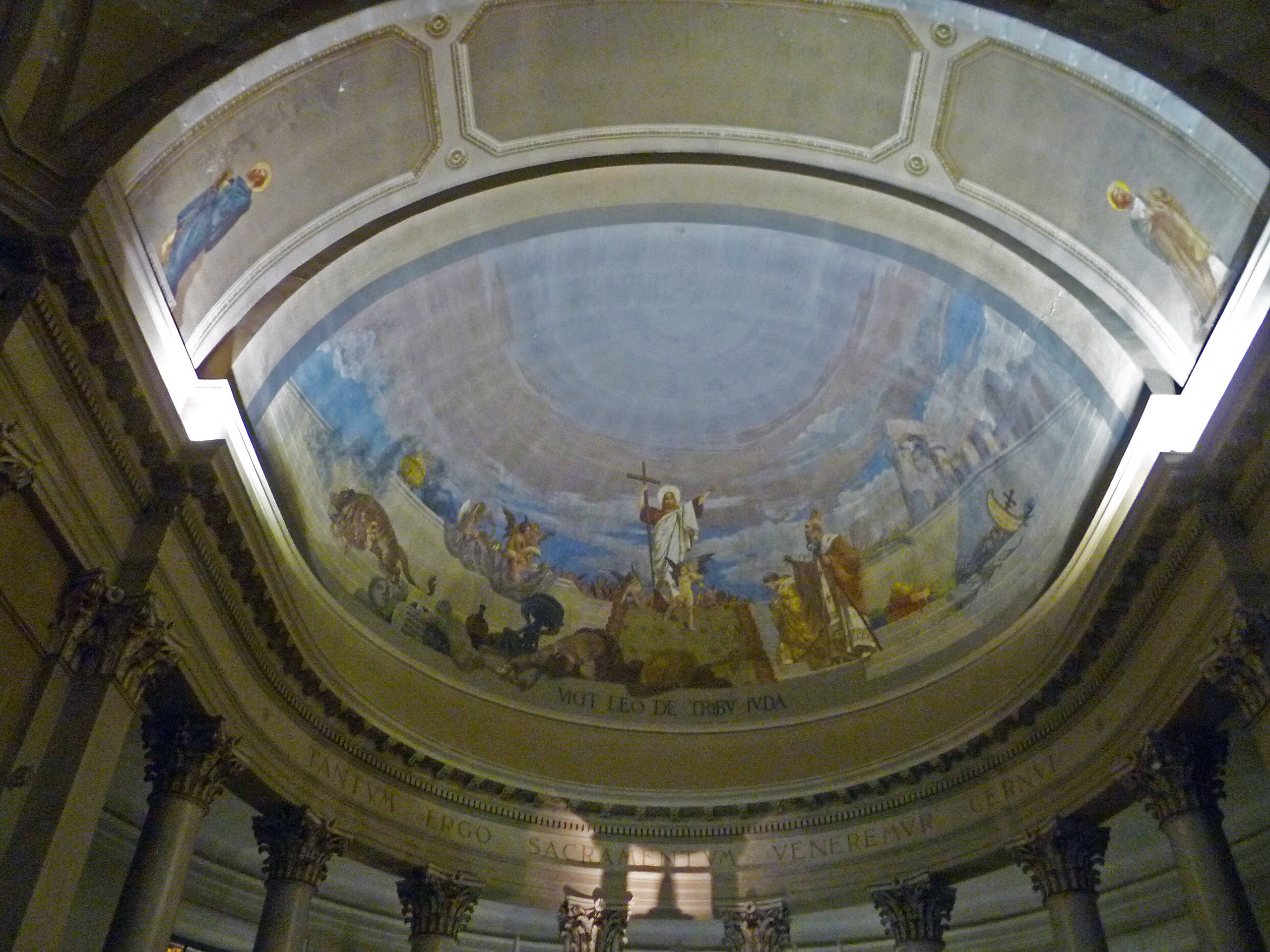
Fresco in the apse "Christ triumphing over Paganism" by Giovanni Bevilacqua

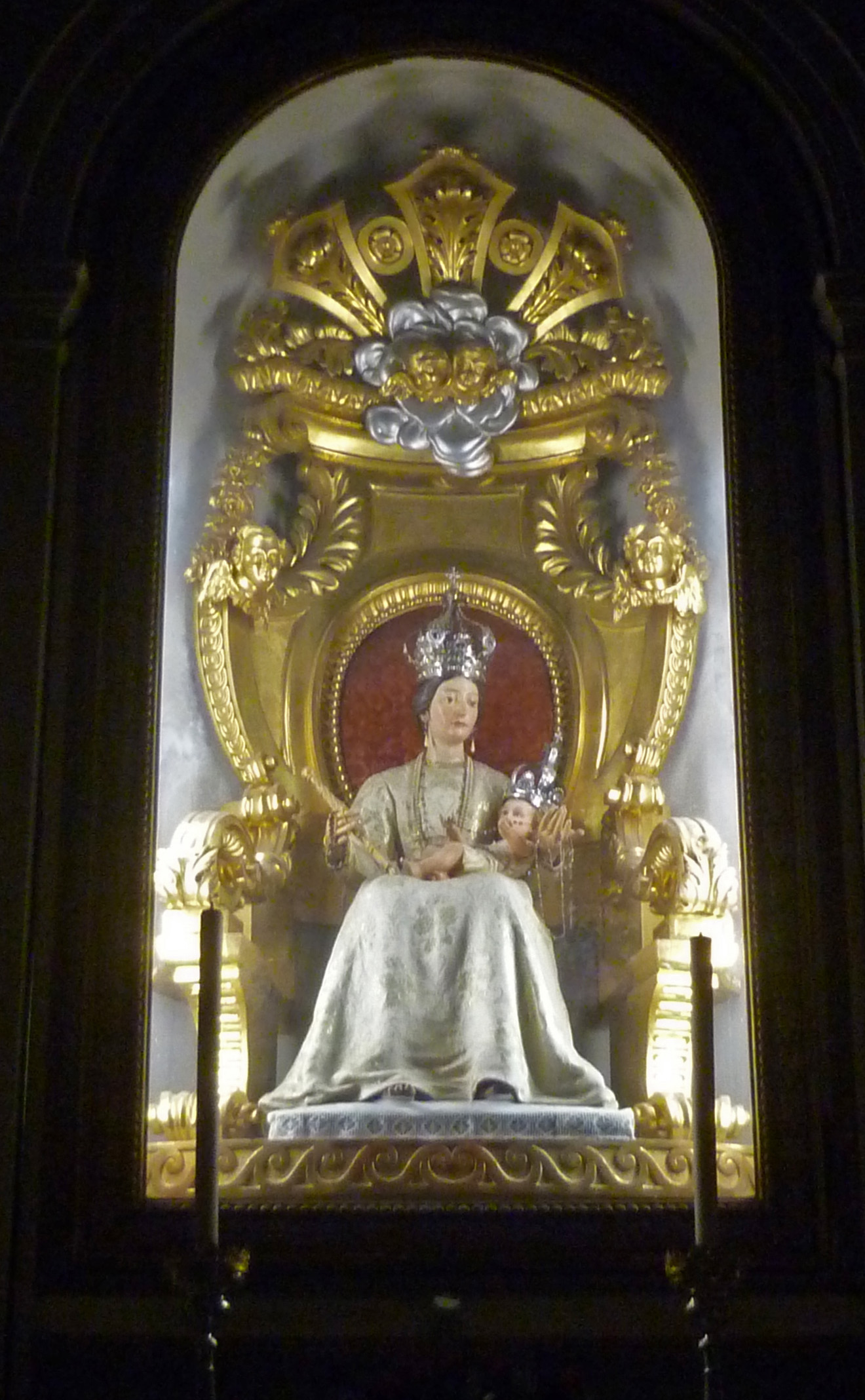
"Our Lady of the Rosary"
