= Cavaion Veronese =

- Comune
- Comune di Cavaion Veronese
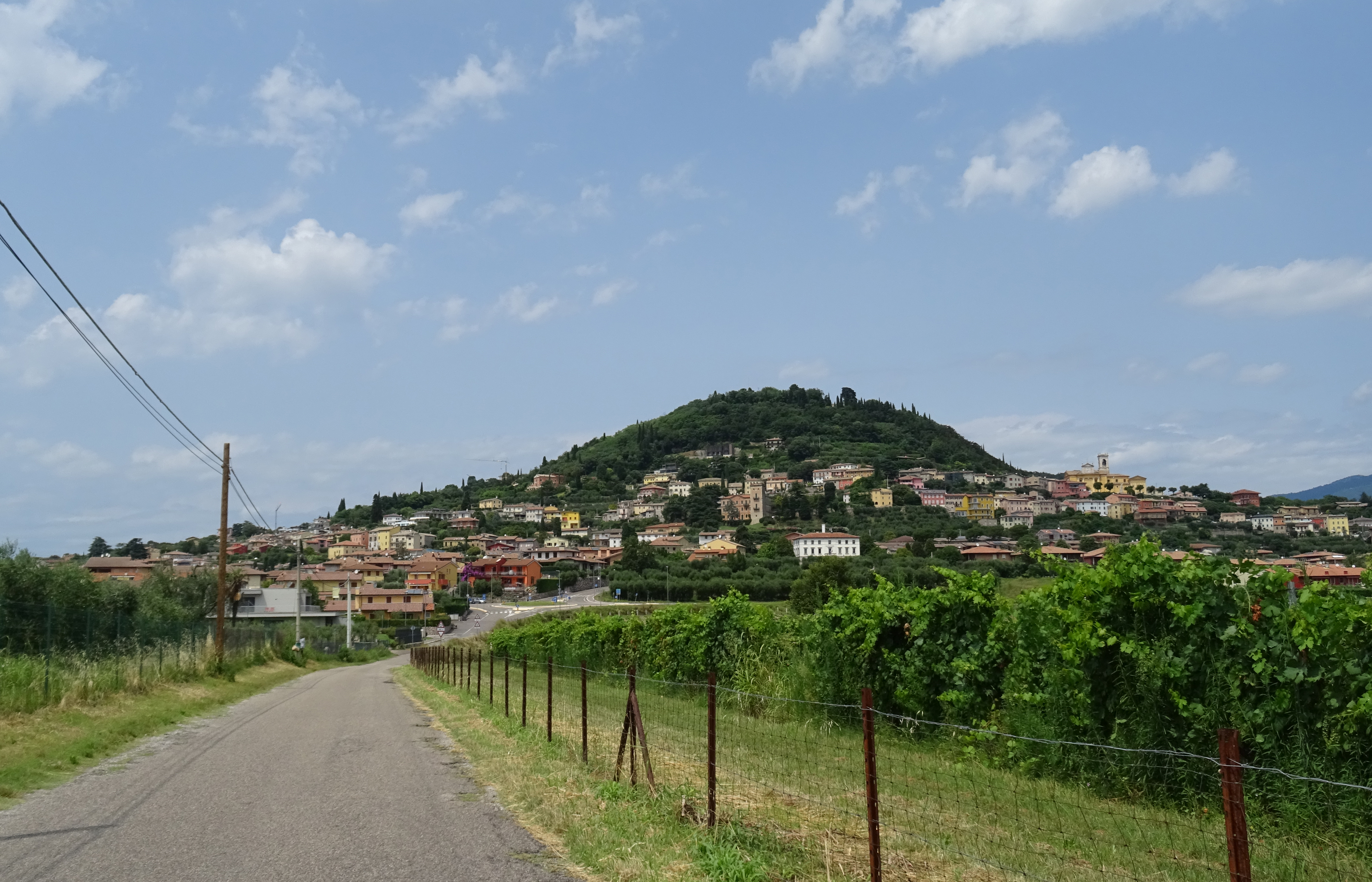

- Location within Italy Location within Veneto
- Coordinates: 45°32′N 10°46′E
- Country: Italy
- Region: Veneto
- Province: Province of Verona (VR)
- Frazioni: Sega

Area
  - Total: 12.9 km^{2} (5.0 sq mi)
- Elevation: 190 m (620 ft)

Population (Dec. 2004)
  - Total: 4,459
  - Density: 346/km^{2} (895/sq mi)
- Demonym: Cavaionesi
- Time zone: UTC+1 (CET)
  - Summer (DST): UTC+2 (CEST)
- Postal code: 37010
- Dialing code: 045
- Website: Official website

Cavaion Veronese is a comune (municipality) in the Province of Verona in the Italian region Veneto, located about 120 kilometres (75 mi) west of Venice and about 20 kilometres (12 mi) northwest of Verona. As of 31 December 2004, it had a population of 4,459 and an area of 12.9 square kilometres (5.0 mi^{2}).

The municipality of Cavaion Veronese contains the frazione (subdivision) Sega.

Cavaion Veronese borders the following municipalities: Affi, Bardolino, Pastrengo, Rivoli Veronese, and Sant'Ambrogio di Valpolicella.

== Demographic evolution ==
Historical population

Year	Pop.	±%
1861	?	—
1871	1,252	—
1881	1,387	+10.8%
1901	1,623	+17.0%
1911	1,867	+15.0%

Year	Pop.	±%
1921	2,005	+7.4%
1931	2,145	+7.0%
1936	2,204	+2.8%
1951	2,320	+5.3%
1961	2,219	−4.4%

Year	Pop.	±%
1971	2,242	+1.0%
1981	3,087	+37.7%
1991	3,414	+10.6%
2001	4,164	+22.0%

Source: Data from ISTAT

== Twin city ==
Cavaion is twinned with

- - Bad Aibling, Bavaria, Germany, since 2006
