= Affi =

- Comune
- Comune di Affi
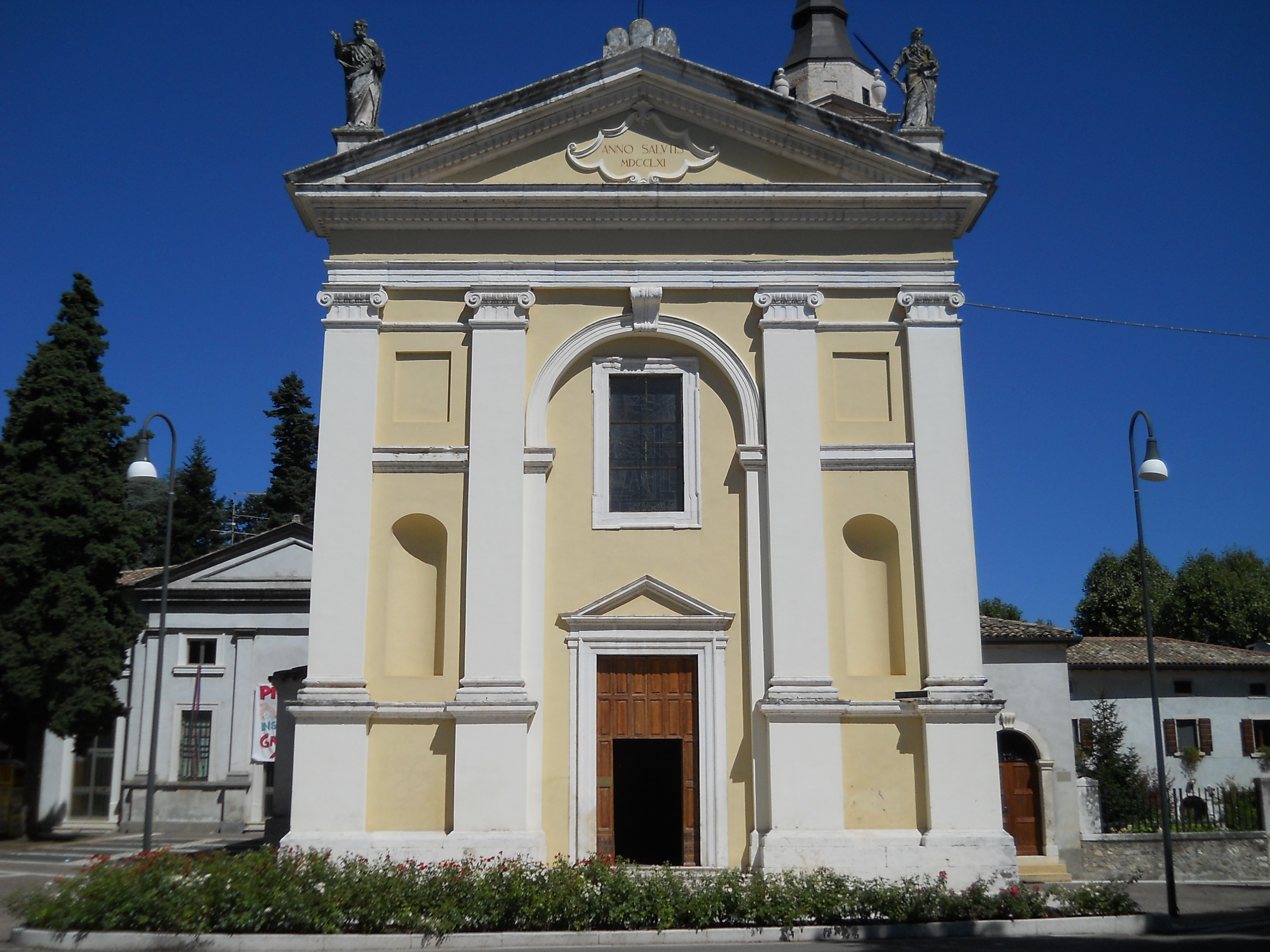
- Parish church of Affi.

- Coat of arms

- Location of Affi in Italy Affi (Veneto)
- Coordinates: 45°33′N 10°46′E
- Country: Italy
- Region: Veneto
- Province: Verona (VR)
- Frazioni: Affi, Incaffi and Caorsa

Government
  - Mayor: Marco Giacomo Sega

Area
  - Total: 9.8 km^{2} (3.8 sq mi)
- Elevation: 191 m (627 ft)

Population (31 December 2020)
  - Total: 2,360
  - Density: 240/km^{2} (620/sq mi)
- Demonym: Affiesi
- Time zone: UTC+1 (CET)
  - Summer (DST): UTC+2 (CEST)
- Postal code: 37010
- Dialing code: 045

Affi is a comune (municipality) in the Province of Verona in the Italian region Veneto, located about 120 kilometres (75 mi) west of Venice and about 20 kilometres (12 mi) northwest of Verona.

The municipality of Affi is divided into the frazioni of Affi, Incaffi and Caorsa. Incaffi was the residence (and the place of death) of the Italian physician Girolamo Fracastoro.

Affi borders the following municipalities: Bardolino, Cavaion Veronese, Costermano, and Rivoli Veronese.

== Geography ==
Affi is located about 120 km west of Venice and 20 km northwest of Verona. The municipality covers an area of 9.84 km².

Affi is situated in the hinterland of Lake Garda, between Bardolino and Rivoli Veronese, and includes the distinctive Mount Moscal (427 m), which overlooks the plain. The climate is sub-Mediterranean, with dry summers and generally dry winters interrupted by occasional rainfall. The vegetation mainly consists of mixed forests of downy oak, European hop-hornbeam, and manna ash.

== History ==
The town is cited for the first time in texts dating from the 9th century CE, a time when, due to the invasions of the Hungarians, the local population was forced to build defensive structures.
