= Costermano sul Garda =

- Comune
- Comune di Costermano sul Garda
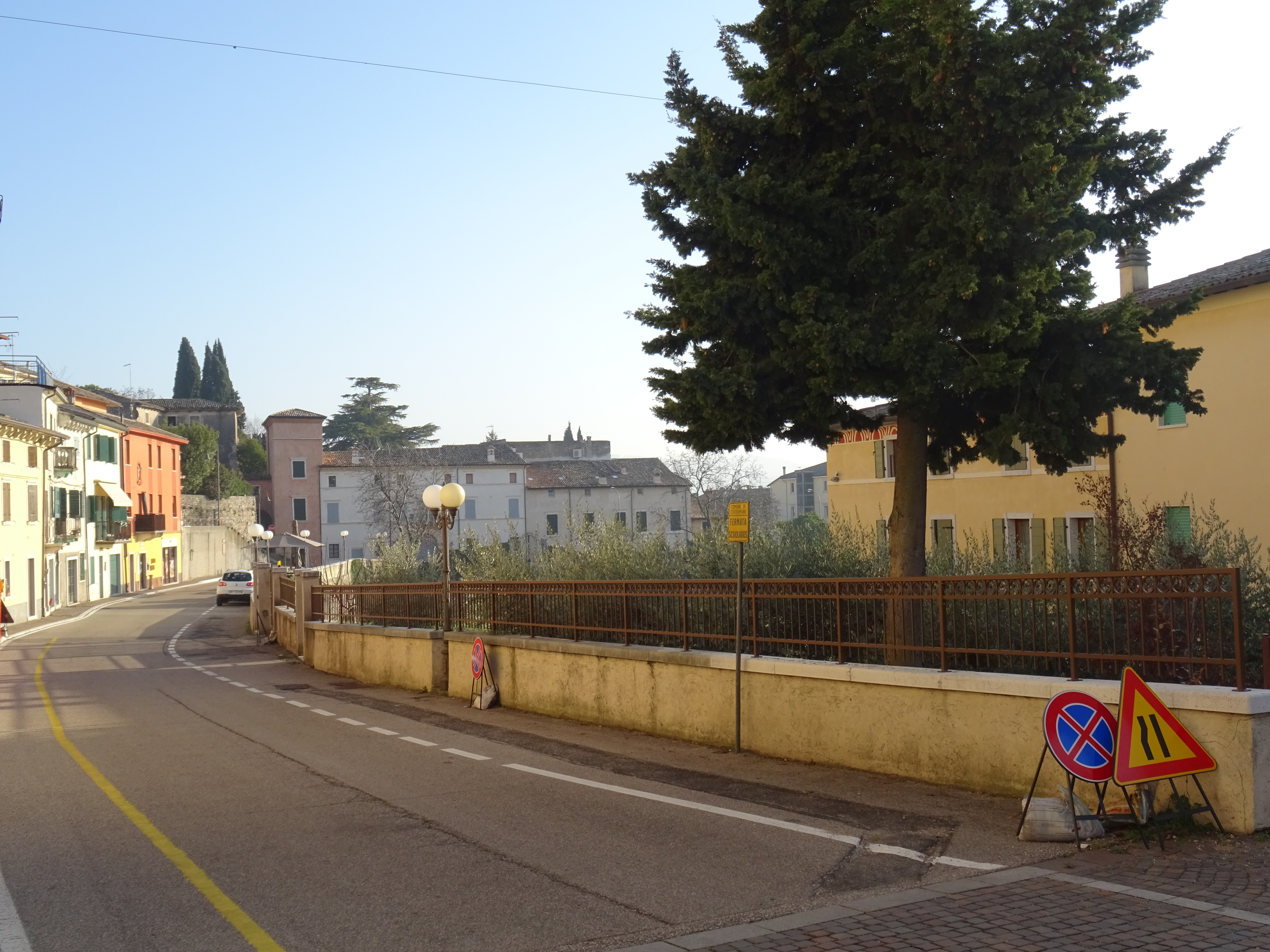

- Coat of arms

- Location within Italy Location within Veneto
- Coordinates: 45°35′N 10°44′E
- Country: Italy
- Region: Veneto
- Province: Verona (VR)
- Frazioni: Albarè, Castion Veronese, Marciaga, Pizzon, San Verolo

Government
  - Mayor: Stefano Passarini

Area
  - Total: 16.74 km^{2} (6.46 sq mi)
- Elevation: 237 m (778 ft)

Population (31 December 2020)
  - Total: 3,849
  - Density: 229.9/km^{2} (595.5/sq mi)
- Demonym: Costermanesi
- Time zone: UTC+1 (CET)
  - Summer (DST): UTC+2 (CEST)
- Postal code: 37010
- Dialing code: 045
- Website: Official website

Costermano sul Garda is a comune (municipality) in the Province of Verona in the Italian region Veneto, located about 120 kilometres (75 mi) west of Venice and about 25 kilometres (16 mi) northwest of Verona.

Costermano sul Garda borders the following municipalities: Affi, Bardolino, Caprino Veronese, Garda, Rivoli Veronese, San Zeno di Montagna, and Torri del Benaco.

== Twin towns ==
- Oberndorf am Lech, Germany, since 1989
