= Bardolino =

- Comune
- Comune di Bardolino
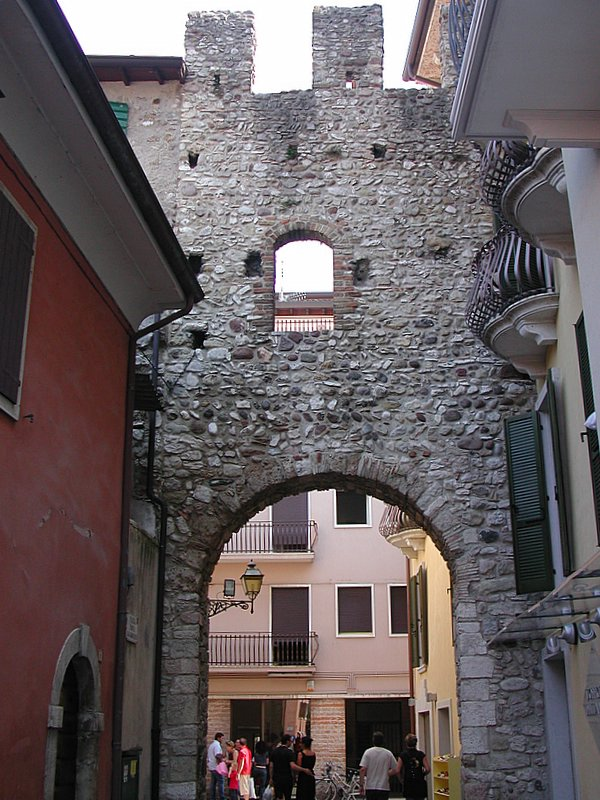
- San Giovanni Gate.

- Coat of arms

- Location within Veneto Location within Italy
- Coordinates: 45°32′N 10°43′E
- Country: Italy
- Region: Veneto
- Province: Verona (VR)
- Frazioni: Cisano, Calmasino

Government
  - Mayor: Ivan De Beni

Area
  - Total: 57.33 km^{2} (22.14 sq mi)
- Elevation: 65 m (213 ft)

Population (31 December 2020)
  - Total: 7,186
  - Density: 125.3/km^{2} (324.6/sq mi)
- Demonym: Bardolinesi
- Time zone: UTC+1 (CET)
  - Summer (DST): UTC+2 (CEST)
- Postal code: 37011
- Dialing code: 045
- Website: Official website

Bardolino is a comune (municipality) in the Province of Verona in the Italian region Veneto, located about 130 kilometres (81 mi) west of Venice and about 25 kilometres (16 mi) northwest of Verona.

== Geography ==
Located on the eastern shore of Lake Garda, Bardolino borders the following municipalities: Affi, Cavaion Veronese, Costermano, Garda, Lazise, Manerba del Garda, Moniga del Garda, Padenghe sul Garda, and Pastrengo. The economy is mostly based on tourism and production of wine (including the Bardolino DOC).

== History ==
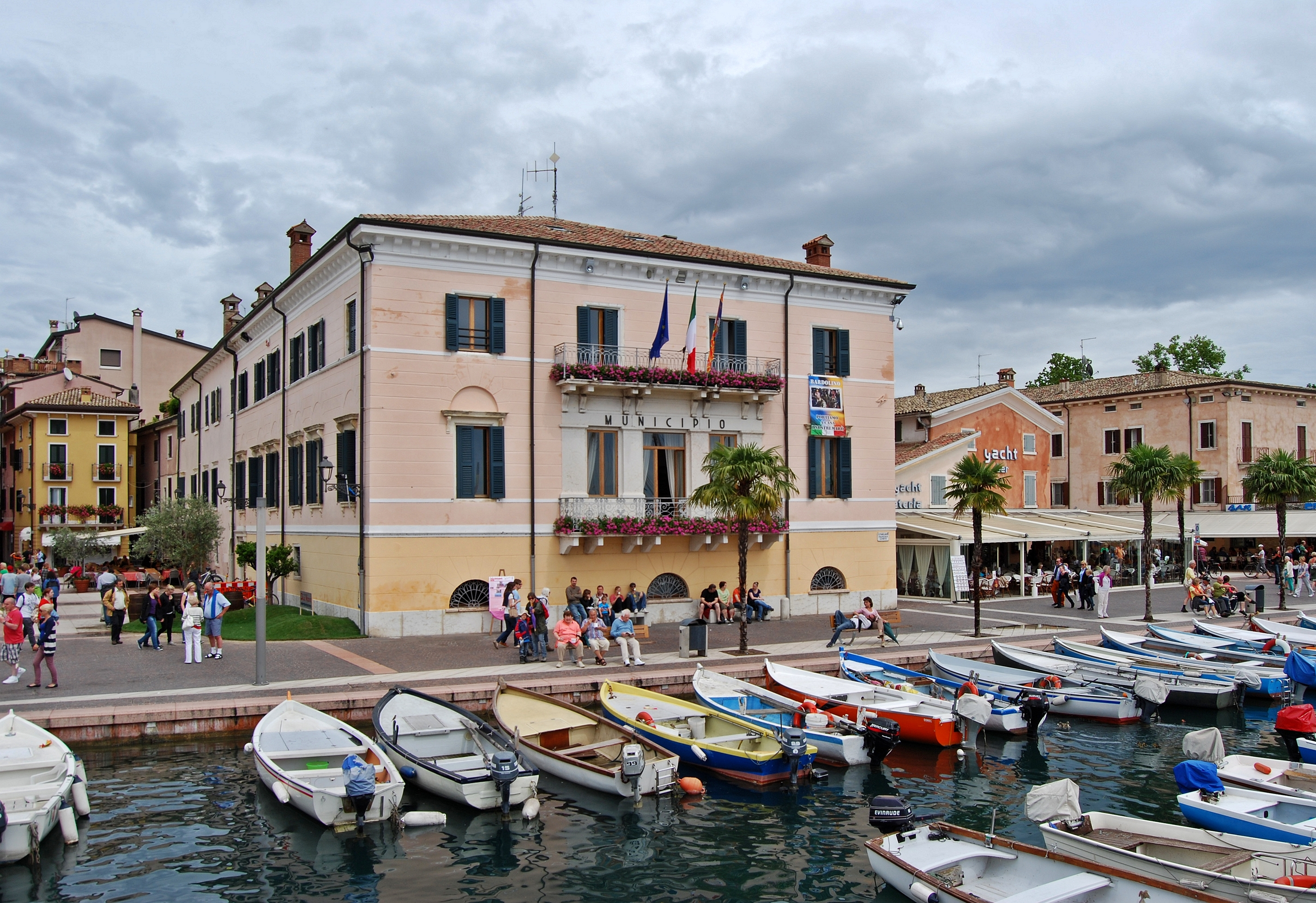
The port of Bardolino

Archaeological excavations have proven the presence of humans in the area since prehistoric times, in the area of Cisano. There are also traces of ancient Romans, though the modern settlement dates to the early Middle Ages, when Berengar of Italy (983) had a castle built here. In that period the area was under the suzerainty of the Bobbio Abbey.

In the 12th century Bardolino is mentioned as a free commune, and later was under the Scaliger of Verona, who enlarged the fortifications to encompass the whole village. After their fall, it became part of the Republic of Venice which had a marine base here. In 1526 it was sacked by the Landsknechts. Under the Lombardy-Venetia, it was an Austrian administrative center: in 1848 it revolted against them in the wake of the first Piedmontese victories in the First Italian War of Independence. However, later the Austrians retaliated with ravages and shootings. It was annexed to the newly formed Kingdom of Italy in 1866.

== Main sights ==
- Church of San Zeno (mid-9th century), one of few Carolingian edifices in Italy. It has traces of original fresco decorations.
- Church of San Severo (11th–12th centuries). It has 12th–14th-century frescoes, and an early medieval crypt.
- Church of San Nicolò and San Severo (1830–1844) by the architect Bartolomeo Giuliari, parochial church.
- Monastery of San Colombano (11th century), a dependency of the Bobbio Abbey
- Pieve of Santa Maria, rebuilt in the 12th century above a 7th-century early Christian church, which had been in turn constructed over an ancient pagan temple.
- City walls (12th century)
- Villa Bottagisio (19th century).
- Villa Guerrieri (19th century).
- Villa Ferrari (19th century).
- Casa Ottolenghi (1974–1978), designed by Carlo Scarpa.
- Museo Sisàn, dedicated to fishing and bird hunting in the Lake Garda area.
- Zeni Wine Museum, founded in 1991 as part of the Zeni Cellar. It exposes objects above all of Veronese wine culture. Free entry for individual visitors, against reservation for groups.
