= Garda, Veneto =

Garda
- Comune
- Comune di Garda
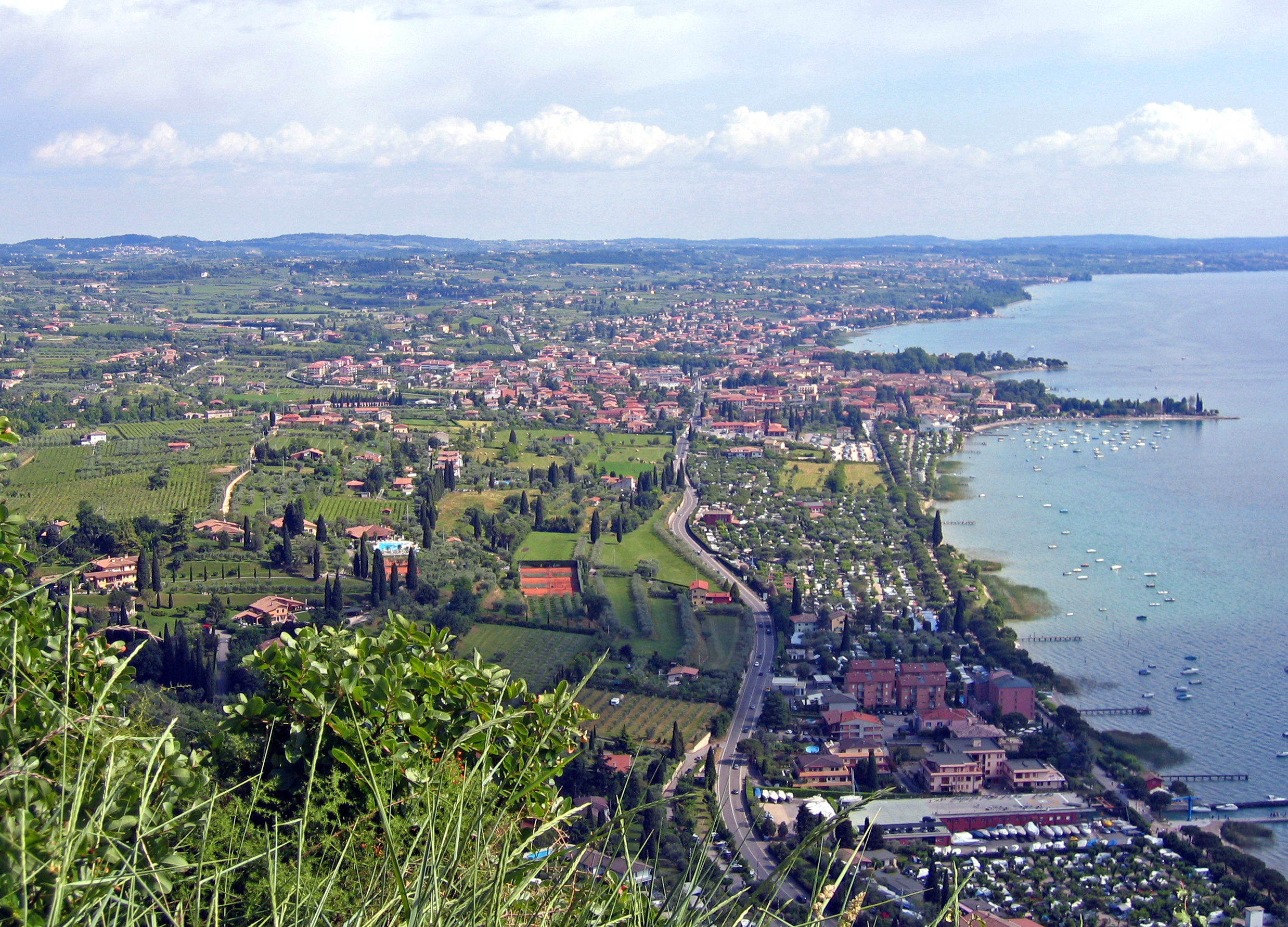

- Location within Italy Location within Veneto
- Coordinates: 45°34′N 10°43′E
- Country: Italy
- Region: Veneto
- Province: Verona (VR)
- Frazioni: -

Government
  - Mayor: Davide Bendinelli

Area
  - Total: 14.37 km^{2} (5.55 sq mi)
- Elevation: 67 m (220 ft)

Population (31 December 2020)
  - Total: 4,132
  - Density: 287.5/km^{2} (744.7/sq mi)
- Demonym: Gardesani
- Time zone: UTC+1 (CET)
  - Summer (DST): UTC+2 (CEST)
- Postal code: 37016
- Dialing code: 045
- Patron saint: Assumption of the Virgin Mary
- Saint day: 15 August
- Website: Official website

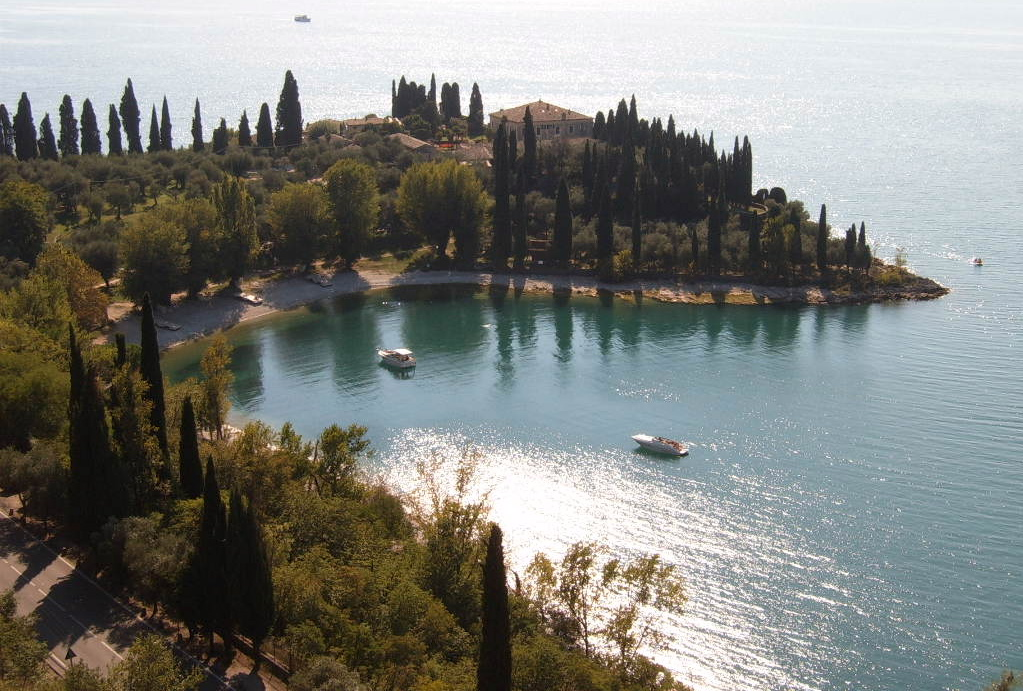
Punta San Vigilio and Baia delle Sirene,.

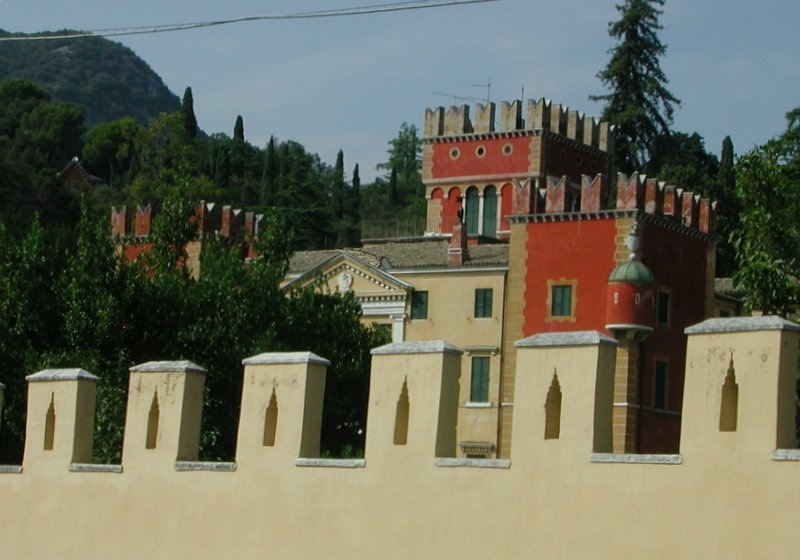
Villa degli Albertini.

Garda is a town and comune on the shore of Lake Garda, in the province of Verona, Veneto, northeastern Italy.

Garda is 32 kilometres (20 miles) from Verona, and is one of the smallest towns in the whole province.

== Main sights ==
The historical centre of the town, with narrow streets, is still intact. Sights include:

- Villa degli Albertini (16th century) with its magnolia trees,
- Palazzo dei Capitani (Captain's Palace), a pale-yellow edifice built in Venetian Gothic style (14th century)
- Palazzo Carlotti, built in Renaissance style
- Santa Maria Assunta. This parish church dates from the 6th–7th century, but was rebuilt starting in 1530 by Giovanni Matteo Giberti. However, the construction was stopped due to lack of funds, and the church, dedicated to the Assumption of the Virgin Mary, was completed only in 1764. The door portals (1824) are made with white Veronese stone. The interior consists of a nave and two aisles. The eastern side is divided by on six heavy columns, while the southern side has four lighter ones. They are all connected by round arches. The statues of Saints Peter and Paul (1886) were made by the Veronese sculptor Righetti, while a large wooden crucifix dates from the 14th–15th centuries. Behind the crucifix is the printed edict of Pope Innocent II (November 1138) resolving the allocation of tithes. The side altar of St. Anthony of Padua dates from 1720. The altarpiece was painted by Simone Brentani, while the statues in Carrara marble represent San Fabiano and San Sebastiano. The two walnut confessionals (17th century) were carved by the workshop of Andrea Brustolon in Rococo style. The side altar (1648) in the "Capella dei Caduti" contains a wooden statue of "Madonna and Child" (in Veronese style, 15th century). In the right aisle is located the side altar with the paintings of Saints Luigi Gonzaga and Vincenzo Ferreri by Gaspare Diziani (1764). The baptismal font dates from the 17th century. The main altar dates from mid 16th century and stands in front of the organ (1958). Behind the altar on the wall is an Assumption of Mary (17th century). The two statues of angels in front of the altar were sculpted by Francesco Filippini (1600). The pulpit was made out of briar root and walnut.
- Rocca of Garda, castle standing 300 m over the town, which offers views over the whole lake. Over the same site is located the 15th century Carmelite monastery.
- San Vigilio, a village whose names comes from Saint Vigilius (San Vigilio), the Bishop of Trento from 385 to 402 AD. In 1540 Agostino Brenzoni built his villa here within a small park, with design by Michele Sammicheli. People who have stayed at the Brenzoni Villa include Tsar Alexander, the King of Naples, Winston Churchill, Laurence Olivier, King Juan Carlos and the British royal family.

== Bounding communes ==
- Bardolino
- Costermano
- Manerba del Garda
- San Felice del Benaco
- Torri del Benaco
