= Rivoli Veronese =

- Comune
- Comune di Rivoli Veronese
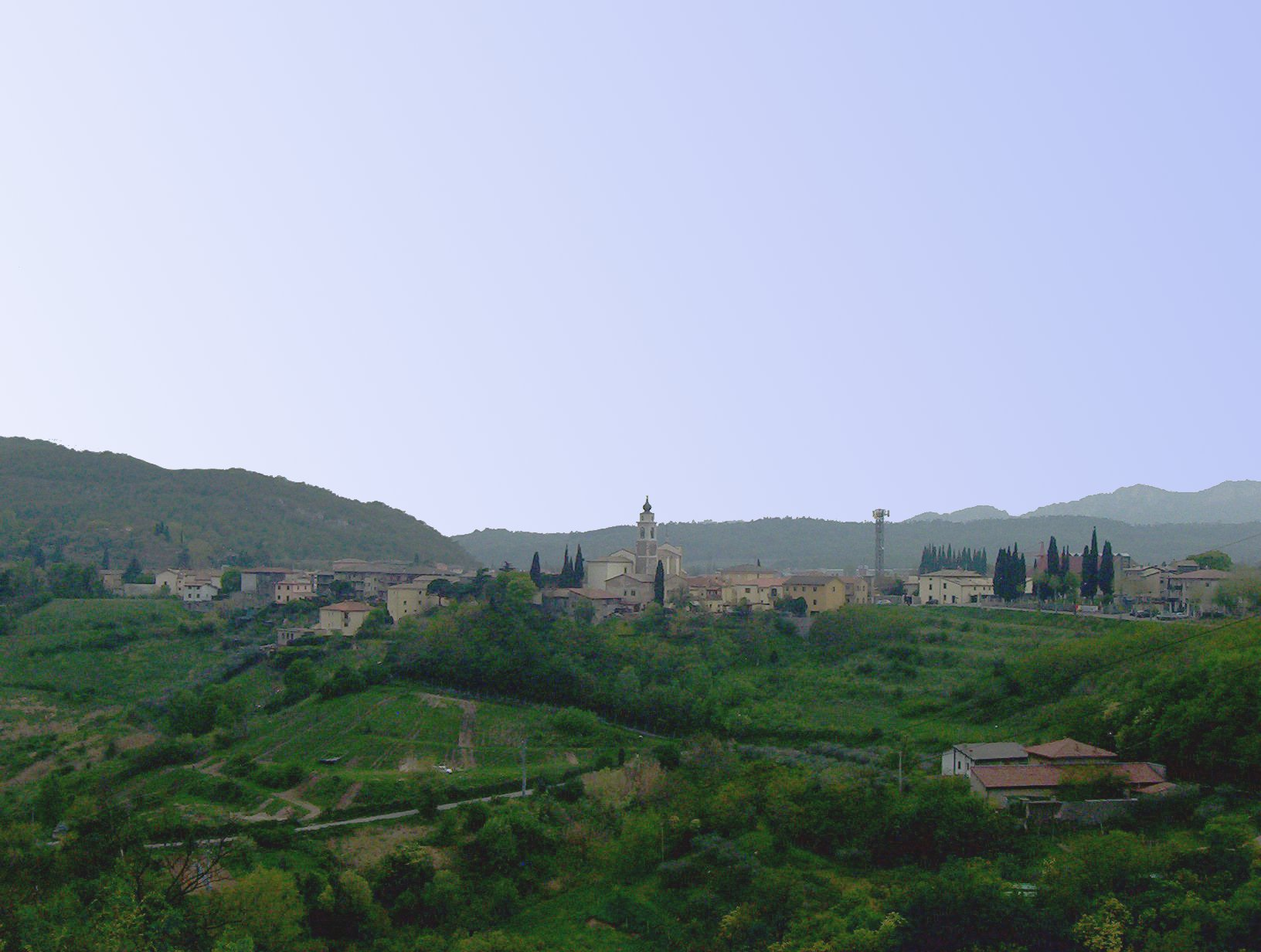

- Coat of arms

- Location within Italy Location within Veneto
- Coordinates: 45°34′N 10°49′E
- Country: Italy
- Region: Veneto
- Province: Verona (VR)
- Frazioni: Canale, Gaium

Government
  - Mayor: Armando Luchesa (Rivoli Futura)

Area
  - Total: 18.43 km^{2} (7.12 sq mi)
- Elevation: 191 m (627 ft)

Population (30 September 2016)
  - Total: 2,129
  - Density: 115.5/km^{2} (299.2/sq mi)
- Demonym: Rivolesi
- Time zone: UTC+1 (CET)
  - Summer (DST): UTC+2 (CEST)
- Postal code: 37010
- Dialing code: 045
- ISTAT code: 023062
- Patron saint: St. Isidore
- Saint day: 11 July
- Website: Official website

Rivoli Veronese is a little town (comune) in the Province of Verona, Veneto, Italy, located on the hills overlooking the right bank of the river Adige, 20 kilometres (12 mi) northwest of Verona.

== History ==
Rivoli Veronese is celebrated as the scene of the Battle of Rivoli in which, on 15 January 1797, Napoleon inflicted a decisive defeat upon the Austrians commanded by Joseph Alvinczy. A street in Paris (Rue de Rivoli) commemorates the victory, and under the empire Marshal André Masséna received the title of duke of Rivoli.

The strong positions around Rivoli, which command the approaches from the County of Tyrol and the upper Adige into the Italian plain, have always been celebrated in military history as a formidable obstacle, and Charles V and Prince Eugene of Savoy preferred to turn them by difficult mountain paths instead of attacking them directly. Minor engagements, such as rearguard actions and holding attacks, have consequently often taken place about them, notably in the campaign of 1796–97.

An engagement of this character was fought here in 1848 between the Austrian and the Piedmontese troops during the First Italian War of Independence.

== People ==
- Sara Simeoni (born 19 April 1953), Italian high jumper
