= 2012–13 Calcio Catania season =

Catania
2012–13 season
- President: Antonino Pulvirenti
- Manager: Rolando Maran
- Stadium: Stadio Angelo Massimino
- Serie A: 8th
- Coppa Italia: Quarter-finals
- Top goalscorer: League: Gonzalo Bergessio (13); All: Gonzalo Bergessio (15)
Home colours	Away colours	Third colours

The 2012–13 Calcio Catania season is the 81st season in club history.

== Players ==
=== Current squad ===
As of 24 August 2012

Note: Flags indicate national team as defined under FIFA eligibility rules; some limited exceptions apply. Players may hold more than one non-FIFA nationality.

No.	Pos.	Nation	Player
1	GK	ITA	Alberto Frison
2	DF	ITA	Alessandro Potenza
3	DF	ARG	Nicolás Spolli
4	MF	ARG	Sergio Almirón
5	DF	URU	Alexis Rolín
6	DF	ITA	Nicola Legrottaglie
8	MF	ITA	Fabio Sciacca
9	FW	ARG	Gonzalo Bergessio
10	MF	ITA	Francesco Lodi
12	DF	ITA	Giovanni Marchese
13	MF	ARG	Mariano Izco (vice-captain)
14	DF	ITA	Giuseppe Bellusci
15	FW	JPN	Takayuki Morimoto
16	MF	ARG	Mario Paglialunga

No.	Pos.	Nation	Player
17	FW	ARG	Alejandro Gómez
18	DF	POL	Błażej Augustyn
19	MF	ARG	Lucas Castro
21	GK	ARG	Mariano Andújar
22	DF	ARG	Pablo Álvarez
24	MF	ARG	Adrián Ricchiuti
26	FW	ESP	Keko
27	MF	ITA	Marco Biagianti (captain)
28	MF	ARG	Pablo Barrientos
29	GK	ITA	Pietro Terracciano
30	MF	GHA	Amidu Salifu (on loan from Fiorentina)
33	DF	ITA	Ciro Capuano (vice-captain)
34	GK	ITA	Giuseppe Messina
35	FW	SEN	Souleymane Doukara

=== On loan ===
Note: Flags indicate national team as defined under FIFA eligibility rules; some limited exceptions apply. Players may hold more than one non-FIFA nationality.

No.	Pos.	Nation	Player
—	DF	ITA	Luca Calapai (on loan at Barletta)
—	DF	ITA	Giordano Maccarone (on loan at Bellaria)
—	DF	CMR	Jean Mbida (on loan at (Slovenia) Gorica)
—	MF	BRA	Raphael Martinho (on loan at Hellas Verona)
—	MF	ITA	Marco Fiore (on loan at Bellaria)
—	MF	ARG	Cristian Llama (on loan at Fiorentina)
—	MF	ITA	Federico Moretti (on loan at Modena)
—	MF	ITA	Cristian Suarino (on loan at Melfi)

No.	Pos.	Nation	Player
—	MF	ITA	Andrea D'Amico (on loan at Milazzo)
—	FW	SEN	Ameth Fall (on loan at Bellaria)
—	FW	ITA	Francesco Nicastro (on loan at Bellaria)
—	FW	ITA	Davide Lanzafame (on loan at Grosseto)
—	FW	ARG	Maxi López (on loan at Sampdoria)
—	FW	ITA	Andrea Catellani (on loan at Sassuolo)
—	FW	ITA	Mirco Antenucci (on loan at Spezia)
—	FW	ITA	Alfredo Donnarumma (on loan at Como)

== Competitions ==
=== Legend ===
Win Draw Loss Postponed

=== Serie A ===
==== League table ====
Pos	Team	Pld	W	D	L	GF	GA	GD	Pts	Qualification or relegation
6	Roma	38	18	8	12	71	56	+15	62	
7	Lazio	38	18	7	13	51	42	+9	61	Qualification for the Europa League group stage (Note: Lazio qualified for the 2013–14 UEFA Europa League group stage after winning 2012–13 Coppa Italia.)
8	Catania	38	15	11	12	50	46	+4	56	
9	Inter Milan	38	16	6	16	55	57	−2	54	
10	Parma	38	13	10	15	45	46	−1	49	

Source: Serie A, Soccerway
Rules for classification: 1st points; 2nd head-to-head points; 3rd head-to-head goal difference; 4th goal difference; 5th number of goals scored; 6th public draw.
(Head-to-head record is applied for clubs with the same number of points only once all matches between said clubs have been played)

==== Matches ====
26 August 2012 1	Roma	2–2	Catania	Rome
20:45	Bradley (yellow card) 13'; Burdisso (yellow card) 28'; Osvaldo 59'; Marquinho (yellow card) 87'; López 90+1'	http://cdn.legaseriea.it/c/document_library/get_file?uuid=97c2a5be-f8b4-4d59-97fe-de79971511b7&groupId=10192	Marchese 29', (yellow card) 90+5'; Gómez 69'; Álvarez (yellow card) 81'	Stadium: Stadio Olimpico; Attendance: 36,000; Referee: Andrea De Marco

1 September 2012 2	Catania	3–2	Genoa	Catania
20:45	Castro (yellow card) 55'; Bellusci (yellow card) 59'; Bergessio (yellow card) 63', (goal) 66', 68'; Lodi 84'	http://cdn.legaseriea.it/c/document_library/get_file?uuid=aad5bc56-0ce9-461d-94f2-8505a23e7165&groupId=10192	Canini (yellow card) 22'; Kucka 26'; Seymour (yellow card) 32'; Janković 82'	Stadium: Stadio Angelo Massimino; Attendance: 15,000; Referee: Antonio Danilo Giannoccaro

16 September 2012 3	Fiorentina	2–0	Catania	Florence
15:00	Ljajić (yellow card) 19'; Pizarro (yellow card) 39'; Jovetić 43', (yellow card) 68'; Toni 65'	http://cdn.legaseriea.it/c/document_library/get_file?uuid=34d722f0-0e29-4954-ae2f-4e19ec295b9c&groupId=10192	Gómez (yellow card) 39'; Spolli (yellow card) 84'	Stadium: Stadio Artemio Franchi; Attendance: 21,000; Referee: Daniele Doveri

23 September 2012 4	Catania	0–0	Napoli	Catania
15:00	Álvarez (red card) 2'; Bergessio (yellow card) 8'; Legrottaglie (yellow card) 59'; Almirón (yellow card) 62'	http://cdn.legaseriea.it/c/document_library/get_file?uuid=88d8ce0b-c4f4-4daf-b455-1bf74f9111ca&groupId=10192	Zúñiga (yellow card) 6'; Inler (yellow card) 16'; Aronica (yellow card) 64'; Vargas (yellow card) 73'	Stadium: Stadio Angelo Massimino; Attendance: 13,808; Referee: Mauro Bergonzi

26 September 2012 5	Catania	2–1	Atalanta	Catania
20:45	Gómez (yellow card) 8'; Spolli 52'; Barrientos 64'; Bellusci (yellow card) 90+1'	http://cdn.legaseriea.it/c/document_library/get_file?uuid=06a13834-96c4-4592-9032-4b25a1f85656&groupId=10192	Cazzola (yellow card) 46'; Moralez 50'; Lucchini (yellow card) 85'	Stadium: Stadio Angelo Massimino; Attendance: 13,240; Referee: Massimiliano Irrati

30 September 2012 6	Bologna	4–0	Catania	Bologna
15:00	Guarente 19'; Diamanti (yellow card) 26'; Gilardino 40', 61'; Kone 90+4'	http://cdn.legaseriea.it/c/document_library/get_file?uuid=226012df-006e-4049-9c3f-7ac64bb81c4a&groupId=10192	Legrottaglie (yellow card) 45'; Izco (yellow card) 71'; Capuano (red card) 83'	Stadium: Stadio Renato Dall'Ara; Referee: Piero Giacomelli

7 October 2012 7	Catania	2–0	Parma	Catania
15:00	Gómez 2'; Biagianti (yellow card) 76'; Bergessio 80'	Report	Galloppa (yellow card) 27'; Biabiany (yellow card) 34'; Lucarelli (yellow card) 52'; Benalouane (yellow card) 61' (yellow-red card) 69'; Parolo (yellow card) 74'; Mirante (yellow card) 84'	Stadium: Stadio Angelo Massimino; Referee: Giampaolo Calvarese

21 October 2012 8	Internazionale	2–0	Catania	Milan
15:00	Cassano 28'; Palacio 85'	http://cdn.legaseriea.it/c/document_library/get_file?uuid=17aefd3b-ce48-4c7a-acf9-baf460df89d7&groupId=10192	Legrottaglie (yellow card) 75'; Castro (yellow card) 88'	Stadium: San Siro; Referee: Carmine Russo

28 October 2012 9	Catania	0–1	Juventus	Catania
12:30	Rolín (yellow card) 19'; Spolli (yellow card) 28'; Barrientos (yellow card) 33'; Marchese (yellow card) 35' (yellow-red card) 67'; Legrottaglie (yellow card) 39'	http://cdn.legaseriea.it/c/document_library/get_file?uuid=ca2588a3-0b1f-4b71-a556-93e943d95cec&groupId=10192	Asamoah (yellow card) 23'; Vidal 57', (yellow card) 68'; Padoin (yellow card) 90+2'	Stadium: Stadio Angelo Massimino; Referee: Andrea Gervasoni

31 October 2012 10	Udinese	2–2	Catania	Udine
20:45	Coda (yellow card) 20'; Di Natale 29' (pen.); Danilo (yellow card) 85'	http://cdn.legaseriea.it/c/document_library/get_file?uuid=4f73da19-cc28-4fbb-89f7-f62a47635397&groupId=10192	Spolli (yellow card) 28'; Bellusci (yellow card) 44'; Biagianti (yellow card) 54'; Castro 62'; Lodi 86'	Stadium: Stadio Friuli; Referee: Gianluca Rocchi

4 November 2012 11	Catania	4–0	Lazio	Catania
15:00	Gómez 9', 29'; Lodi 25' (pen.); Álvarez (yellow card) 27'; Barrientos 69'	http://cdn.legaseriea.it/c/document_library/get_file?uuid=812320f7-341e-4a1a-bbf9-7c4a4d70df56&groupId=10192		Stadium: Stadio Angelo Massimino; Referee: Paolo Silvio Mazzoleni

10 November 2012 12	Cagliari	0–0	Catania	Quartu Sant'Elena
18:00	Conti (yellow card) 12'; Dessena (yellow card) 81'; Nainggolan (yellow card) 87'; Astori (yellow card) 90'	http://cdn.legaseriea.it/c/document_library/get_file?uuid=4cb24d64-b81a-4c60-ae67-cac78a062fe7&groupId=10192	Gómez (yellow card) 36'; Almirón (yellow card) 82'	Stadium: Stadio Is Arenas; Referee: Marco Di Bello

18 November 2012 13	Catania	2–1	Chievo	Catania
15:00	Almirón 51', 85'; Castro (yellow card) 61'; Álvarez (yellow card) 63'	http://cdn.legaseriea.it/c/document_library/get_file?uuid=ad124fc0-cdcc-4ac6-9d0d-42c5a042a8f4&groupId=10192	Hetemaj (yellow card) 49'; Luciano (yellow card) 70'; Sardo (yellow card) 72'; Andreolli 90+3'	Stadium: Stadio Angelo Massimino; Referee: Sebastiano Peruzzo

24 November 2012 14	Palermo	3–1	Catania	Palermo
20:45	Miccoli 10', (yellow card) 81'; Muñoz (yellow card) 40'; Donati (yellow card) 42'; Iličić 49', 60'	http://cdn.legaseriea.it/c/document_library/get_file?uuid=924cd323-890e-48c6-829b-936cb84c7276&groupId=10192	Spolli (yellow card) 43'; Almirón (yellow card) 54'; Lodi 71'; Gómez (yellow card) 86'; Doukara (yellow card) 90+2'	Stadium: Stadio Renzo Barbera; Referee: Andrea Romeo

30 November 2012 15	Catania	1–3	Milan	Catania
20:45	Legrottaglie 11'; Barrientos (yellow card) 41' (yellow-red card) 49'; Bellusci (yellow card) 86'; Rolín (yellow card) 90+5'	http://cdn.legaseriea.it/c/document_library/get_file?uuid=b1aba5ea-22c9-446d-9496-e672520b9ba0&groupId=10192	El Shaarawy 52', 90+2', (yellow card) 54'; Boateng 56', (red card) 90'; Amelia (yellow card) 60'	Stadium: Stadio Angelo Massimino; Referee: Daniele Orsato

9 December 2012 16	Siena	1–3	Catania	Siena
15:00	Rosina 10'; Sestu (yellow card) 12'; Rodríguez (yellow card) 62'	http://cdn.legaseriea.it/c/document_library/get_file?uuid=94facdea-7e34-49ee-9cfe-8b9d770c7942&groupId=10192	Legrottaglie (yellow card) 23'; Castro 50'; Bergessio 67', 82'; Almirón (yellow card) 75'	Stadium: Stadio Artemio Franchi; Attendance: 8,240; Referee: Daniele Doveri

16 December 2012 17	Catania	3–1	Sampdoria	Catania
14:00	Salifu (yellow card) 1'; Legrottaglie (yellow card) 28'; Bellusci (yellow card) 42'; Paglialunga 55'; Bergessio 65'; Castro 90'	http://cdn.legaseriea.it/c/document_library/get_file?uuid=0a8d41d5-e7ef-47b0-968c-82adfadb0e67&groupId=10192	Maresca 29' (pen.); Éder (yellow card) 55'; Tissone (yellow card) 70'	Stadium: Stadio Angelo Massimino; Attendance: 14,000; Referee: Piero Giacomelli

21 December 2012 18	Pescara	2–1	Catania	Pescara
17:00	Çelik 23', (yellow card) 61'; Togni 90+5', (yellow card) 90+5'	http://cdn.legaseriea.it/c/document_library/get_file?uuid=24aaf3f6-f323-4066-847b-5d98d476a640&groupId=10192	Barrientos (yellow card) 24', (goal) 35'; Izco (yellow card) 44'	Stadium: Stadio Adriatico; Attendance: 10,246; Referee: Andrea Romeo

6 January 2013 19	Catania	0–0	Torino	Catania
14:00	Lodi (red card) 13'; Barrientos (yellow card) 30'; Legrottaglie (yellow card) 75'		Gazzi (yellow card) 22'; Vives (yellow card) 59'; Darmian (yellow card) 71'; Masiello (yellow card) 77'; Glik (yellow card) 82'	Stadium: Stadio Angelo Massimino; Attendance: 14,000; Referee: Mauro Bergonzi

13 January 2013 20	Catania	1–0	Roma	Catania
15:00	Bellusci (yellow card) 17'; Gómez 62'; Legrottaglie (yellow card) 65'; Marchese (yellow card) 68'; Bergessio (yellow card) 72'		Balzaretti (yellow card) 8'; Destro (yellow card) 14'; Castán (yellow card) 64'	Stadium: Stadio Angelo Massimino; Attendance: 13,614; Referee: Antonio Damato

20 January 2013 21	Genoa	0–2	Catania	Genoa
14:00	Matuzalém (yellow card) 18'		Bergessio 4', (yellow card) 21'; Barrientos 86'	Stadium: Stadio Luigi Ferraris; Attendance: 20,000; Referee: Nicola Rizzoli

27 January 2013 22	Catania	2–1	Fiorentina	Catania
15:00	Capuano (yellow card) 19'; Bellusci (yellow card) 35'; Biagianti (yellow card) 37'; Legrottaglie 50'; Spolli (yellow card) 60'; Castro 80', (yellow card) 90+2'; Álvarez (yellow card) 86'		Migliaccio 21'; Savić (yellow card) 32'; Cuadrado (yellow card) 64'; Aquilani (red card) 78'	Stadium: Stadio Angelo Massimino; Attendance: 14,000; Referee: Domenico Celi

2 February 2013 23	Napoli	2–0	Catania	Naples
19:45	Behrami (yellow card) 5'; Hamšík 31'; Grava (yellow card) 40'; Cannavaro 44'; Džemaili (yellow card) 57'		Spolli (yellow card) 37'	Stadium: Stadio San Paolo; Attendance: 36,000; Referee: Giampaolo Calvarese

10 February 2013 24	Atalanta	0–0	Catania	Bergamo
15:00	Scaloni (yellow card) 33'; Del Grosso (yellow card) 41'; Bonaventura (yellow card) 52'; Biondini (yellow card) 72'; Livaja (yellow card) 89'	http://cdn.legaseriea.it/c/document_library/get_file?uuid=285f4f4c-fe33-44e3-8af8-975a02c91e9b&groupId=10192	Bergessio (yellow card) 41'; Álvarez (yellow card) 67'; Castro (yellow card) 90+1'	Stadium: Stadio Atleti Azzurri d'Italia; Attendance: 14,000; Referee: Davide Massa

17 February 2013 25	Catania	1–0	Bologna	Catania
15:00	Almirón 42'; Biagianti (yellow card) 90+2'	http://cdn.legaseriea.it/c/document_library/get_file?uuid=b3c61c55-f864-4ea0-9bb9-cc594b333c78&groupId=10192	Morleo (yellow card) 57'; Pérez (yellow card) 88'	Stadium: Stadio Angelo Massimino; Attendance: 14,000; Referee: Carmine Russo

24 February 2013 26	Parma	1–2	Catania	Parma
15:00 CET	Paletta (yellow card) 57'; Amauri 87'	http://cdn.legaseriea.it/c/document_library/get_file?uuid=803b3ea3-bfca-403a-9ff5-979265e0a8ad&groupId=10192	Lodi 5'; Bellusci (yellow card) 30'; Keko 44'; Legrottaglie (yellow card) 87' (yellow-red card) 88'	Stadium: Stadio Ennio Tardini; Attendance: 14,000; Referee: Piero Giacomelli

3 March 2013 27	Catania	2–3	Internazionale	Catania
14:00	Bergessio 7', (yellow card) 70'; Marchese 19'; Álvarez (yellow card) 37'; Rolín (yellow card) 56'; Çani (yellow card) 87'	http://cdn.legaseriea.it/c/document_library/get_file?uuid=2d064c45-c436-4097-933f-e8af7d35d669&groupId=10192	Álvarez 52'; Palacio 70', 90+2'; Handanović (yellow card) 70'; Schelotto (yellow card) 84'	Stadium: Stadio Angelo Massimino; Attendance: 14,000; Referee: Mauro Bergonzi

10 March 2013 28	Juventus	1–0	Catania	Turin
14:00	Giaccherini (yellow card) 89', (goal) 90+1'	http://cdn.legaseriea.it/c/document_library/get_file?uuid=e80091ae-33a7-4025-8cac-c37d900e05da&groupId=10192	Gómez (yellow card) 41'; Biagianti (yellow card) 64'; Spolli (yellow card) 65'	Stadium: Juventus Stadium; Attendance: 38,000; Referee: Antonio Danilo Giannoccaro

16 March 2013 29	Catania	3–1	Udinese	Catania
15:00	Gómez 49', 67'; Bellusci (yellow card) 56'; Álvarez (yellow card) 69'; Lodi 72'	http://cdn.legaseriea.it/c/document_library/get_file?uuid=6a335dc8-c2fb-42f1-b8a7-ee6a5f9d0f0f&groupId=10192	Benatia (yellow card) 46'; Muriel 81'	Stadium: Stadio Angelo Massimino; Attendance: 14,000; Referee: Andrea De Marco

30 March 2013 30	Lazio	2–1	Catania	Rome
15:00	Ledesma (yellow card) 76'; Legrottaglie 79' (o.g.); Candreva 81' (pen.); Marchetti (yellow card) 90+3'	http://cdn.legaseriea.it/c/document_library/get_file?uuid=2f025107-8683-4583-8e4e-ea9993e4138b&groupId=10192	Marchese (yellow card) 17'; Izco 50'; Barrientos (yellow card) 90+3'	Stadium: Stadio Olimpico; Attendance: 31,000; Referee: Davide Massa

7 April 2013 31	Catania	0–0	Cagliari	Catania
15:00	Bellusci (yellow card) 68'	http://cdn.legaseriea.it/c/document_library/get_file?uuid=b2168e28-8754-4def-97d0-1c54f186b31e&groupId=10192	Cabrera (yellow card) 56'; Nainggolan (yellow card) 59'; Dessena (yellow card) 67'; Pinilla (yellow card) 75'; Ekdal (yellow card) 90'	Stadium: Stadio Angelo Massimino; Attendance: 13,000; Referee: Paolo Valeri

14 April 2013 32	Chievo	0–0	Catania	Verona
15:00	Samassa (yellow card) 72'	http://cdn.legaseriea.it/c/document_library/get_file?uuid=0943bbbb-1796-414d-9d84-4fbc9affd739&groupId=10192	Bellusci (yellow card) 23'; Izco (yellow card) 81'	Stadium: Stadio Marc'Antonio Bentegodi; Attendance: 10,000; Referee: Piero Giacomelli

21 April 2013 33	Catania	1–1	Palermo	Catania
15:00	Barrientos 69'; Spolli (yellow card) 75'; Bellusci (yellow card) 90+4'; Andújar (red card) 90+5'	http://cdn.legaseriea.it/c/document_library/get_file?uuid=d6ebd8a3-bf71-4f10-9f6b-9cebf9f12c89&groupId=10192	Donati (yellow card) 1'; Dossena (yellow card) 16'; Muñoz (yellow card) 56'; Iličić 90+5'	Stadium: Stadio Angelo Massimino; Referee: Paolo Silvio Mazzoleni

28 April 2013 34	Milan	4–2	Catania	Milan
20:45	De Sciglio (yellow card) 9'; Flamini 45', (yellow card) 78'; Balotelli (yellow card) 72', (goal) 90+2' (pen.); Pazzini 74', 77'	http://cdn.legaseriea.it/c/document_library/get_file?uuid=095feb21-fbea-467f-988a-0f8c65a6c9ac&groupId=10192	Bergessio (yellow card) 26', (goal) 65'; Legrottaglie 30', (yellow card) 41'; Frison (yellow card) 37'; Barrientos (yellow card) 78'; Marchese (yellow card) 86'	Stadium: San Siro; Referee: Davide Massa

5 May 2013 35	Catania	3–0	Siena	Catania
15:00	Bergessio 14', 52', 71'; Spolli (yellow card) 54'	http://cdn.legaseriea.it/c/document_library/get_file?uuid=eca3f6e8-c97e-421f-8c69-db7fcb10d648&groupId=10192	Felipe (red card) 42'; Emeghara (yellow card) 82'	Stadium: Stadio Angelo Massimino; Referee: Luca Banti

8 May 2013 36	Sampdoria	1–1	Catania	Genoa
20:45	De Silvestri 36', (yellow card) 67'	Report	Almirón (yellow card) 24'; Marchese (yellow card) 39'; Spolli 68'; Rolín (yellow card) 75'; Keko (yellow card) 83'	Stadium: Stadio Luigi Ferraris; Referee: Domenico Celi

12 May 2013 37	Catania	1–0	Pescara	Catania
20:45	Gómez 51'; Bellusci (yellow card) 63'	http://cdn.legaseriea.it/c/document_library/get_file?uuid=68e84533-9f53-418c-bb65-64423ac24ed2&groupId=10192	Ćosić (yellow card) 40'; Balzano (yellow card) 60'; Bocchetti (yellow card) 63'; Zauri (yellow card) 84'	Stadium: Stadio Angelo Massimino; Referee: Fabrizio Pasqua

19 May 2013 38	Torino	2–2	Catania	Turin
14:00	Cerci 53'; Bianchi 83'	http://cdn.legaseriea.it/c/document_library/get_file?uuid=07f26de1-5e80-4b35-9521-f680070e475a&groupId=10192	Frison (yellow card) 8'; Almirón 25'; Bergessio 62'; Augustyn (yellow card) 75'	Stadium: Stadio Olimpico di Torino; Referee: Sebastiano Peruzzo

=== Coppa Italia ===
18 August 2012 Third round	Catania	1–0	Sassuolo	Catania
19:45	Gómez 73'			Stadium: Stadio Angelo Massimino; Attendance: 3,500; Referee: Maurizio Ciampi

4 December 2012 Fourth round	Catania	3–1	Cittadella	Catania
17:30	Bergessio 88', 102'; Lodi 96'	Report	Paolucci 41'	Stadium: Stadio Angelo Massimino; Referee: Filippo Merchiori

12 December 2012 Round of 16	Parma	1–1 (a.e.t.) (3–4 p)	Catania	Parma
16:30	Pabón 10'	Report	Lodi 30' (pen.)	Stadium: Stadio Ennio Tardini; Attendance: 2,601; Referee: Davide Massa
	Penalties
	Pabón (penalty scored); Marchionni (penalty scored); Parolo (penalty missed); Ninis (penalty scored); Paletta (penalty missed)		(penalty missed) Barrientos; (penalty scored) Álvarez; (penalty scored) Lodi; (penalty scored) Bergessio; (penalty scored) Marchese

8 January 2013 Quarter-finals	Lazio	3–0	Catania	Rome
20:00	Radu 30'; Hernanes 61', 90+1'	Report		Stadium: Stadio Olimpico; Referee: Domenico Celi

== Squad statistics ==
=== Appearances and goals ===
No.	Pos	Nat	Player	Total		Serie A		Coppa Italia	
No.	Pos	Nat	Player	Apps	Goals	Apps	Goals	Apps	Goals
Goalkeepers
1	GK	(Italy) ITA	Alberto Frison	7	0	4	0	3	0
21	GK	(Argentina) ARG	Mariano Andújar	35	0	34	0	1	0
29	GK	(Italy) ITA	Pietro Terracciano	0	0	0	0	0	0
Defenders
2	DF	(Italy) ITA	Alessandro Potenza	2	0	0+2	0	0	0
3	DF	(Argentina) ARG	Nicolás Spolli	29	2	29	2	0	0
5	DF	(Uruguay) URU	Alexis Rolín	13	0	9+2	0	2	0
6	DF	(Italy) ITA	Nicola Legrottaglie	30	3	26+1	3	3	0
12	DF	(Italy) ITA	Giovanni Marchese	32	2	29+1	2	1+1	0
14	DF	(Italy) ITA	Giuseppe Bellusci	29	0	22+4	0	3	0
18	DF	(Poland) POL	Błażej Augustyn	1	0	0+1	0	0	0
22	DF	(Argentina) ARG	Pablo Alvarez	30	0	26+1	0	3	0
33	DF	(Italy) ITA	Ciro Capuano	18	0	9+5	0	4	0
Midfielders
4	MF	(Argentina) ARG	Sergio Almirón	33	4	26+4	4	3	0
8	MF	(Italy) ITA	Fabio Sciacca	3	0	0+3	0	0	0
10	MF	(Argentina) ARG	Francesco Lodi	37	8	33	6	4	2
13	MF	(Argentina) ARG	Mariano Izco	37	1	31+4	1	2	0
19	MF	(Argentina) ARG	Lucas Castro	39	4	18+18	4	2+1	0
24	MF	(Argentina) ARG	Adrián Ricchiuti	9	0	0+8	0	0+1	0
27	MF	(Italy) ITA	Marco Biagianti	29	0	17+11	0	0+1	0
28	MF	(Argentina) ARG	Pablo Barrientos	35	5	30+1	5	4	0
30	MF	(Ghana) GHA	Amidu Salifu	12	0	4+6	0	2	0
Forwards
9	FW	(Argentina) ARG	Gonzalo Bergessio	36	15	32	13	2+2	2
17	FW	(Argentina) ARG	Alejandro Gómez	39	9	34+2	8	3	1
26	FW	(Spain) ESP	Keko	5	1	2+2	1	0+1	0
32	FW	(Albania) ALB	Edgar Çani	4	0	0+4	0	0	0
35	FW	(Senegal) SEN	Souleymane Doukara	14	0	1+11	0	0+2	0
Players transferred out during the season
15	FW	(Japan) JPN	Takayuki Morimoto	8	0	1+4	0	2+1	0
16	MF	(Argentina) ARG	Mario Paglialunga	7	1	1+5	1	0+1	0

Last updated: 28 October 2012
Source: Competitions

=== Top scorers ===
This includes all competitive matches. The list is sorted by shirt number when total goals are equal.

R	No.	Pos	Nat	Name	Serie A	Coppa Italia	Total
1	9	FW	(Argentina)	Gonzalo Bergessio	13	2	15
2	17	MF	(Argentina)	Alejandro Gómez	8	1	9
3	10	MF	(Italy)	Francesco Lodi	6	2	8
4	28	MF	(Argentina)	Pablo Barrientos	5	0	5
5	4	MF	(Argentina)	Sergio Almirón	4	0	4
=	19	MF	(Argentina)	Lucas Castro	4	0	4
7	6	DF	(Italy)	Nicola Legrottaglie	3	0	3
8	3	DF	(Argentina)	Nicolás Spolli	2	0	2
=	12	DF	(Italy)	Giovanni Marchese	2	0	2
10	13	MF	(Argentina)	Mariano Izco	1	0	1
=	16	MF	(Argentina)	Mario Paglialunga	1	0	1
=	26	MF	(Spain)	Keko	1	0	1

Last updated: 28 October 2012
Source: Competitions
