= 2013–14 Calcio Catania season =

Catania
2013–14 season
- President: Antonino Pulvirenti
- Manager: Rolando Maran (until 20 October 2013); Luigi De Canio (until 16 January 2014); Rolando Maran (until 6 April 2014); Maurizio Pellegrino
- Stadium: Stadio Angelo Massimino
- Serie A: 18th
- Coppa Italia: Round of 16
- Top goalscorer: League: Gonzalo Bergessio (10); All: Gonzalo Bergessio (10)
Home colours	Away colours	Third colours

The 2013–14 Calcio Catania season was the 82nd season in club history.

== Players ==
=== Squad information ===
Note: Flags indicate national team as defined under FIFA eligibility rules; some limited exceptions apply. Players may hold more than one non-FIFA nationality.

No.	Pos.	Nation	Player
1	GK	ITA	Alberto Frison
2	DF	ARG	Gino Peruzzi
3	DF	ARG	Nicolás Spolli
4	MF	ARG	Sergio Almirón
5	DF	URU	Alexis Rolín
6	DF	ITA	Nicola Legrottaglie
7	MF	GRE	Panagiotis Tachtsidis
7	FW	ITA	Francesco Fedato
8	MF	CZE	Jaroslav Plašil
9	FW	ARG	Gonzalo Bergessio
10	FW	ARG	Maxi López
10	MF	ITA	Francesco Lodi
11	MF	ARG	Sebastián Leto
13	MF	ARG	Mariano Izco (Captain)
14	DF	ITA	Giuseppe Bellusci
15	MF	ARG	Fabián Rinaudo
17	MF	ITA	Tiberio Guarente
18	DF	ARG	Fabián Monzón

No.	Pos.	Nation	Player
19	MF	ARG	Lucas Castro
20	MF	ARG	Federico Freire
21	GK	ARG	Mariano Andújar
22	DF	ARG	Pablo Álvarez
23	FW	ITA	Kingsley Boateng
24	DF	SVK	Norbert Gyömbér
26	FW	ESP	Keko
27	MF	ITA	Marco Biagianti
28	MF	ARG	Pablo Barrientos
29	FW	ITA	Fabio Aveni
31	DF	CRC	Erick Cabalceta
32	FW	CRO	Bruno Petković
33	DF	ITA	Ciro Capuano (vice-captain)
34	DF	ITA	Cristiano Biraghi
35	FW	SEN	Souleymane Doukara
36	FW	ITA	Simone Caruso
39	MF	ITA	Agatino Garufi

== Competitions ==
=== Serie A ===
==== League table ====
Pos	Team	Pld	W	D	L	GF	GA	GD	Pts	Qualification or relegation
16	Chievo	38	10	6	22	34	54	−20	36	
17	Sassuolo	38	9	7	22	43	72	−29	34	
18	Catania (R)	38	8	8	22	34	66	−32	32	Relegation to Serie B
19	Bologna (R)	38	5	14	19	28	58	−30	29	Relegation to Serie B
20	Livorno (R)	38	6	7	25	39	77	−38	25	Relegation to Serie B

Source: Serie A, Soccerway
Rules for classification: 1st points; 2nd head-to-head points; 3rd head-to-head goal difference; 4th goal difference; 5th number of goals scored; 6th public draw.
(Head-to-head record is applied for clubs with the same number of points only once all matches between said clubs have been played)
(R) Relegated
