= Francesco Nicastro =

Italian footballer (born 1991)

Personal information
- Date of birth: 26 October 1991 (age 35)
- Place of birth: Campofranco, Italy
- Height: 1.82 m (5 ft 11 1/2 in)
- Position: Forward

Team information
- Current team: Vis Pesaro
- Number: 9

Youth career
- –2011: Catania

Senior career*
Years	Team	Apps	(Gls)
2010–2013	Catania	0	(0)
2011	→ Pisa (loan)	5	(0)
2012	→ Milazzo (loan)	11	(2)
2012–2013	→ Bellaria (loan)	27	(10)
2013–2014	Rimini	22	(9)
2014–2016	Juve Stabia	59	(16)
2016–2018	Pescara	0	(0)
2016–2017	→ Perugia (loan)	32	(9)
2017–2018	→ Foggia (loan)	27	(3)
2018–2019	Foggia	0	(0)
2018–2019	→ Ternana (loan)	20	(3)
2019–2020	Catanzaro	18	(4)
2020–2022	Padova	51	(14)
2022–2024	Pontedera	52	(17)
2024–	Vis Pesaro	81	(12)
- * Club domestic league appearances and goals as of 30 April 2026

Francesco Nicastro (born 26 October 1991) is an Italian professional footballer who plays as a forward for Serie C Group B club Vis Pesaro.

== Club career ==
=== Catania ===
After working his way through the Catania youth system, the young striker began to be called up on occasion to the first team during the 2009–10 Serie A season. The player made his first team debut as a substitute in the Coppa Italia, quarterfinal match versus Roma on 26 January 2010. Nicastro failed to make any first team appearances during the 2010–11 Serie A campaign, however he did play a major role in the club's youth team, with 12 goals. In July 2011, Nicastro was promoted from the youth squad before being loaned to Pisa in the Italian third division on 19 July 2011.

On 31 August 2012, Nicastro, Marco Fiore and Giordano Maccarrone were loaned to Bellaria.

=== Rimini ===
On 6 August 2013, Nicastro and Ameth Fall were signed by Rimini. On 20 June 2014 Rimini acquired Nicastro outright.

=== Juve Stabia ===
In the 2014–15 season he was signed by Juve Stabia.

=== Catanzaro ===
On 27 July 2019 he signed a 3-year contract with Catanzaro.

=== Padova ===
On 8 January 2020 he moved to Padova on a 2-year contract.

=== Pontedera ===
On 25 August 2022, Nicastro signed a one-year contract with Pontedera.

=== Vis Pesaro ===
On 12 January 2024, Nicastro joined Vis Pesaro on a three-year deal.
