= Amidu Salifu =

Ghanaian professional footballer (born 1992)

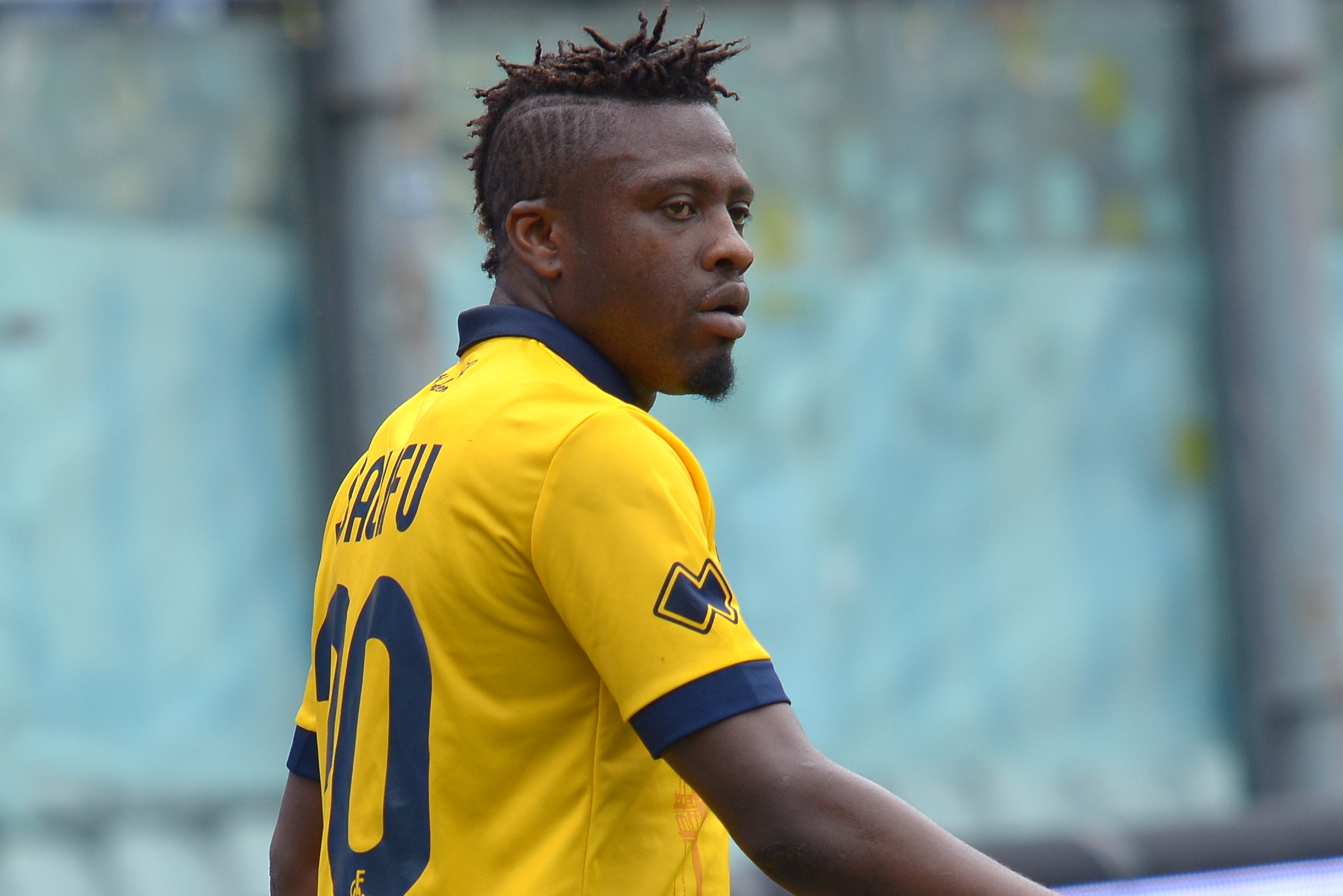

Personal information
- Full name: Amidu Salifu
- Date of birth: September 20, 1992 (age 34)
- Place of birth: Accra, Ghana
- Height: 1.82 m (6 ft 0 in)
- Position: Midfielder

Youth career
- –2010: Vicenza
- 2011–2012: Fiorentina

Senior career*
Years	Team	Apps	(Gls)
2010–2011	Vicenza	8	(0)
2011–2020	Fiorentina	15	(0)
2012–2013	→ Catania (loan)	10	(0)
2013–2015	→ Modena (loan)	53	(1)
2015	→ Perugia (loan)	5	(0)
2016	→ Brescia (loan)	13	(0)
2016–2017	→ Mantova (loan)	28	(0)
2017–2018	→ Vicenza (loan)	18	(0)
2018–2019	→ Arezzo (loan)	9	(0)
2019–2020	→ Al-Salmiya (loan)	15	(2)
2020–2021	Petrolul Ploiești	9	(0)
2022	Kelantan United	5	(1)

International career
2012	Ghana U-20	2	(0)
- * Club domestic league appearances and goals as of 25 February 2022

Amidu Salifu (born September 20, 1992) is a Ghanaian professional footballer who plays as midfielder.

== Club career ==
=== Vicenza Calcio ===
Salifu started his youth career with Italian club Vicenza Calcio and made his debut with the senior squad in the 2010–11 Serie B season before going on to sign for ACF Fiorentina in January 2011. He made eight league appearances for the biancorossi prior to his transfer.

=== Fiorentina ===
Following his transfer to the Florence-based club, Salifu was hardly utilized as a first team member. The young midfielder made his Serie A debut for Fiorentina on 23 April 2011 in a match against Cagliari, when he came on as a 90th minute substitute for former club captain, Adrian Mutu. He would eventually go on to make an additional 12 appearances throughout the 2011–12 Serie A season, before being loaned to Calcio Catania in June 2012. He has made 11 appearances in all competitions for the club since his arrival, generally serving as a reserve for the likes of Sergio Almirón, Francesco Lodi, and Marco Biagianti.

In the summer of 2019, he moved to Kuwaiti club Al-Salmiya on loan.
