= Papu Gómez =

Argentine footballer (born 1988)

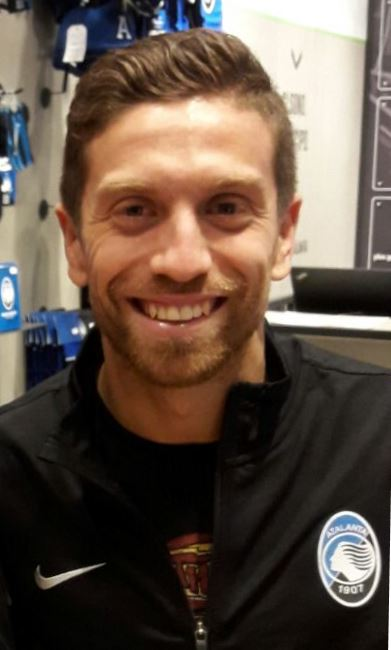
- Gómez with Atalanta in 2017

Personal information
- Full name: Alejandro Darío Gómez Villaverde
- Date of birth: 15 February 1988 (age 38)
- Place of birth: Buenos Aires, Argentina
- Height: 1.67 m (5 ft 6 in)
- Positions: Attacking midfielder; left winger

Team information
- Current team: Forte Virtus
- Number: 33

Youth career
- 2003–2006: Arsenal de Sarandí

Senior career*
Years	Team	Apps	(Gls)
2005–2009	Arsenal de Sarandí	77	(12)
2009–2010	San Lorenzo	48	(8)
2010–2013	Catania	106	(16)
2013–2014	Metalist Kharkiv	23	(3)
2014–2021	Atalanta	209	(50)
2021–2023	Sevilla	66	(9)
2023–2024	Monza	2	(0)
2025–2026	Padova	9	(0)
2026–	Forte Virtus	0	(0)

International career
2007	Argentina U20	11	(2)
2017–2022	Argentina	17	(3)
Medal record
Men's football
Representing Argentina
FIFA World Cup
Winner	2022 Qatar
Copa América
Winner	2021 Brazil
CONMEBOL–UEFA Cup of Champions
Winner	2022 England
FIFA U-20 World Cup
Winner	2007 Canada
- * Club domestic league appearances and goals as of 09 October 2026

Alejandro Darío "Papu" Gómez Villaverde (Spanish pronunciation: [aleˈxandɾo ðaˈɾi.o ˈɣomes]; (Note: In isolation, Darío and Gómez are pronounced [daˈɾi.o] and [ˈɡomes] respectively.) born 15 February 1988) is an Argentine professional footballer who plays as a forward, left winger or attacking midfielder for UAE First Division League club Forte Virtus.

Gómez started his club career in his native Argentina with Arsenal de Sarandí in 2005 before joining San Lorenzo in 2009. The following year, he was signed by Italian club Catania. In 2013, he joined Ukrainian side Metalist Kharkiv, where he remained for a single season, before returning to Italy to play for Atalanta. In 2019–20, Gómez set the Serie A record for most assists in a single season with sixteen, and was named to the Serie A Team of the Year.

Although he was born in Argentina, Gómez is a dual citizen of Argentina and Italy, having gained Italian citizenship on 14 May 2016. He made his senior international debut for Argentina in a friendly against Singapore in 2017, during which he also scored his first international goal. He later took part in Argentina's victorious 2021 Copa América and 2022 FIFA World Cup campaigns.

== Club career ==
=== Arsenal de Sarandí ===
Gómez began his career playing with the youth squad of Argentine side Arsenal de Sarandí, debuting for the team in 2003. Two years later, he was officially called up to the first team, but did not feature as a regular with the side until the 2006 Torneo Apertura, during which he scored 2 goals in 15 appearances, as Arsenal finished the season in 5th place.

On 30 November 2007, Gómez scored the 2 most important goals up to that point of his career in the first leg of the Copa Sudamericana Finals, away against favourites Club América of Liga MX, giving Arsenal a valuable 3–2 lead going into the second leg. On 5 December, Arsenal lost the return leg 2–1, but won their first international title on the away goals rule.

The 2008–09 season was his breakout season, as he scored 8 goals in 18 appearances and got into the top scoring charts with braces against Independiente and Vélez Sarsfield.

=== San Lorenzo ===
San Lorenzo de Almagro signed Gómez for a 2 million dollar transfer fee, half of his estimated market value, in time for the 2009 Clausura tournament. His impressive play, including netting 8 times in 48 appearances for Los Santos, attracted the attention of several high-profile scouts. This led to his transfer to Italian Serie A Catania in July 2010, for €3 million.

=== Catania ===
Catania officially welcomed their new 22-year-old signing on 21 July 2010, and he made his first appearance with the club 9 days later in a 1–0 friendly win against Greek side Iraklis. Gómez was immediately inserted into the starting XI and soon became integral to his club's record-breaking renaissance over the next 3 seasons.

El Papu contributed 4 goals and 5 assists in each of his first 2 seasons. His breakthrough campaign came during the 2012–13 season, when his playmaking and offensive prowess became the main catalyst of the team, propelling his side to club record highs for home and overall victories, and, for their 5th successive year, points. The Rossazzurri clinched an eighth-place finish in Serie A, equaling their historic best placement in the league for the first time since the 1964–65 season, but 5 points shy of earning their inaugural appearance in the UEFA Europa League. The side that managed to achieve these record-breaking achievements was described as the best Catania side in the club's history. Gómez finished the year with a career high 8 goals in 36 appearances, making him the second highest on the team behind Gonzalo Bergessio, as well as 7 assists, making him the club's joint highest assist provider, and the tenth best provider in Serie A.

Catania, for reasons that were never clarified, sold Gómez during the summer and replaced him with the injury-prone and inconsistent Sebastián Leto, whom they acquired on a free transfer from Panathinaikos. Despite having four of their top six offensive players return, and later five of their six when Francesco Lodi was reacquired on loan from Genoa in January, Catania's performances declined heavily, which saw them fall to 18th position in the league, and as a result, they were ultimately relegated.

=== Metalist Kharkiv ===
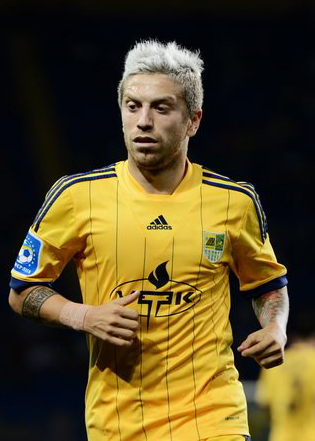
Gómez with Metalist in 2013

Rebuffing offers from several big clubs, including Atletico Madrid, Fiorentina, and Inter, Gómez himself requested a transfer to little-known Metalist Kharkiv of the Ukrainian Premier League, citing the club's commitment to growth and the opportunity to play in the upcoming UEFA Champions League as his reasons. On 2 August 2013, he signed four-year contract with the club, which included a €12 million release clause, following a €7 million transfer fee. However, things did not go well for him with the side from the beginning.

UEFA upheld Metalist's ban from the Champions League two weeks later because of the club's involvement in match fixing in 2008. By the December winter break, failing to settle into his new surroundings due to a combination of the league's lack of visibility and quality, which he believed made playing in it a waste of time, as well as adverse environmental and linguistic issues in Ukraine itself, which he saw as insurmountable, Gómez wanted out of his contract. He therefore requested a transfer back to Serie A as soon as possible, preferably to Fiorentina, and by January 2014, offered to accept a salary reduction in order to have this accomplished. This request went unfilled, however, and he ultimately played in 23 games, scoring 3 goals and setting up 4 others, helping the Hor'ky finish 3rd overall.

Gómez refused to return to Ukraine the following season because of the volatile and violent political climate that emerged during his time there. He stated "It's an anguished situation, very unstable, as we are all sad and living in a state of panic...I have no intention of coming back...I will stay in Buenos Aires...Until there can be guarantees of safety, I cannot expose my family to these dangers." Many players, especially foreign ones, also left the league for this same reason, including three of Gomez's teammates, and six from reigning league Champions Shakhtar Donetsk. As a result, the Ukrainian League saw its foreign player total reduced from 170 to 60 over the next two years.

=== Atalanta ===
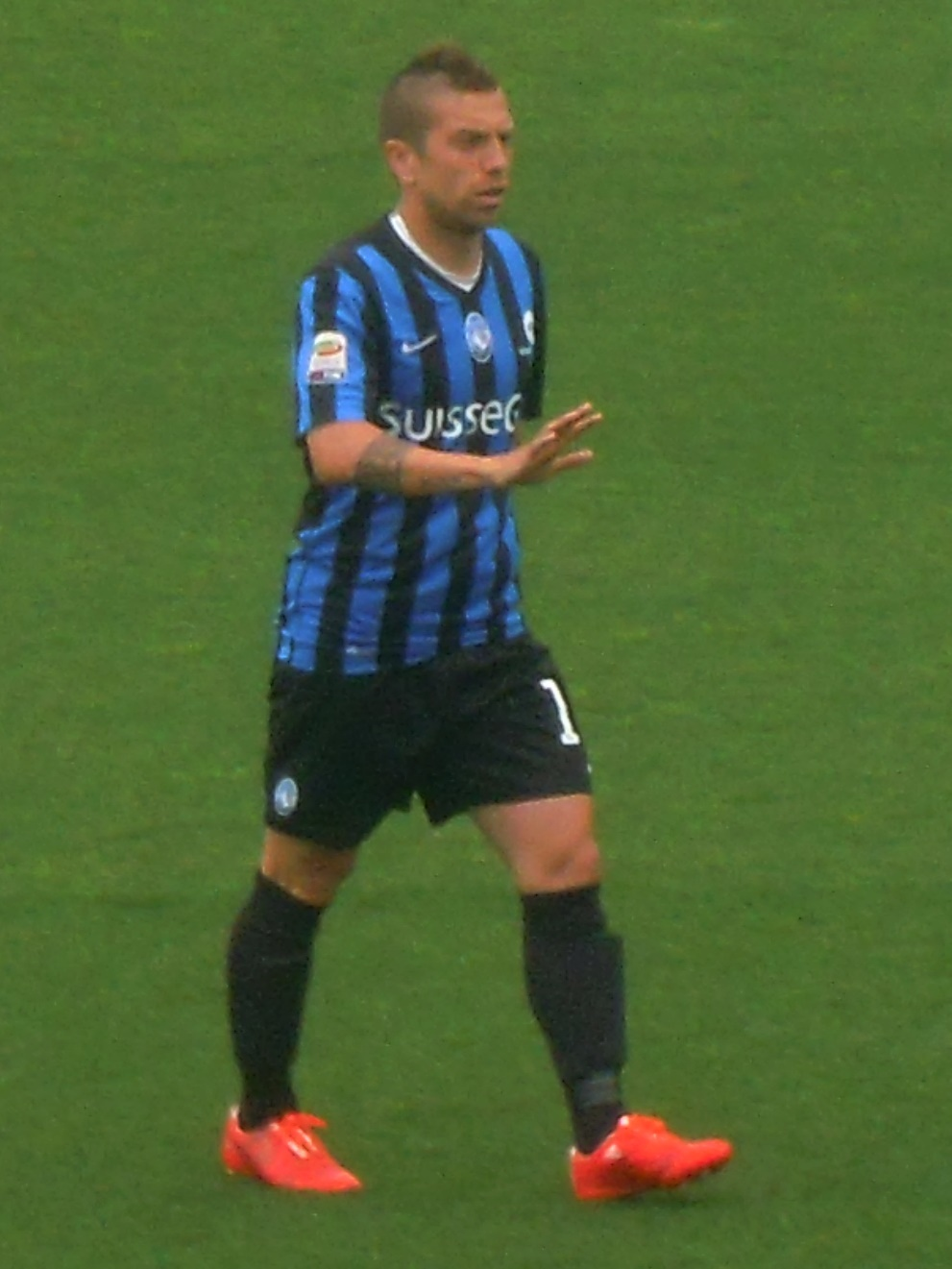
Gómez with Atalanta in 2014

Following Giacomo Bonaventura's departure to Milan on 1 September 2014, Atalanta acquired Gómez on the same day, signing him on a three-year deal in the last hours of the summer transfer window in Italy. Gómez had a decent first season, contributing 3 goals and 2 assists in 24 appearances to a poor, offensively-challenged Nerazzurri squad that struggled and narrowly avoided relegation, finishing fourth from the bottom, 3 points ahead of Serie B-bound Cagliari.

The following season, Gómez lead his club in both goals and assists, with 7 and 6 respectively, as he rekindled the form he had shown in his final season at Catania, and, despite the continued lack of attacking support, steered Atalanta to a respectable 13th-place finish in the league. His performances spurred the interest of several big clubs, which pushed the Bergamese side to extend his contract until June 2020, on 4 February 2016.

During the 2016–17 season, Gómez managed to score an unprecedented total of 16 goals as his team finished in the fourth place contrary to the lower pre-season expectations. In 2017, following the departure and retirement of Cristian Raimondi, he became the team's captain.

As captain, Gómez helped lead Atalanta to a historic third-place finish in the 2018–19 Serie A season, earning a spot in the 2019–20 UEFA Champions League, as well as reaching the 2019 Coppa Italia Final.

Gómez scored his first Champions League goal on 26 November 2019 with a brilliant piece of individual ability in a 2–0 home win against Dinamo Zagreb. During the 2019–20 season, Gómez set the Serie A record for most assists in a single season with 16 assists.

During half time of Atalanta's Champions League group stage match against FC Midtjylland on 1 December 2020, there was a heated exchange between Gómez and manager Gian Piero Gasperini over his positioning on the pitch. Gómez did not re-enter the pitch at the start of the second half. Gomez later claimed that Gasperini tried to "physically attack" him, adding that Gasperini never apologized to the player. After starting in Atalanta's final group stage match against Ajax, the relationship between Gómez and Gasperini completely broke down. Despite amending his relationship with the president, Gómez stated that his relationship with Gasperini could not be fixed; he made his last appearance for the club in a Serie A match against Juventus on 16 December. Gómez requested a transfer in the January transfer window, to which Atalanta agreed, stating however that they would not sell him to a Serie A rival.

=== Sevilla ===
On 26 January 2021, La Liga club Sevilla announced the signing of Gómez on a deal running until June 2024. He made his debut for the club on 2 February, playing 60 minutes of Sevilla's 1–0 victory against Almería in the Copa del Rey. Four days later, he scored his first Sevilla goal in a 3–0 win over Getafe. On 1 September 2023, Gómez and Sevilla reached an agreement to terminate his contract with one year left.

=== Monza ===
On 29 September 2023, Gomez joined Italian club Monza on a free transfer.

On 20 October 2023, Monza announced that Gómez had been found to have failed an anti-doping test, resulting in a two-year ban for the player. Gómez took the drug terbutaline in October 2022, during his time with Sevilla.

=== Padova ===
On 11 July 2025, Gómez signed a two-year contract with Padova in Serie B. He would continue to train individually, away from the team, until the expiration of his ban term.

=== Forte Virtus ===
On 28 September 2026, Padova announced the transfer of Gómez to Forte Virtus in the United Arab Emirates second tier.

== International career ==
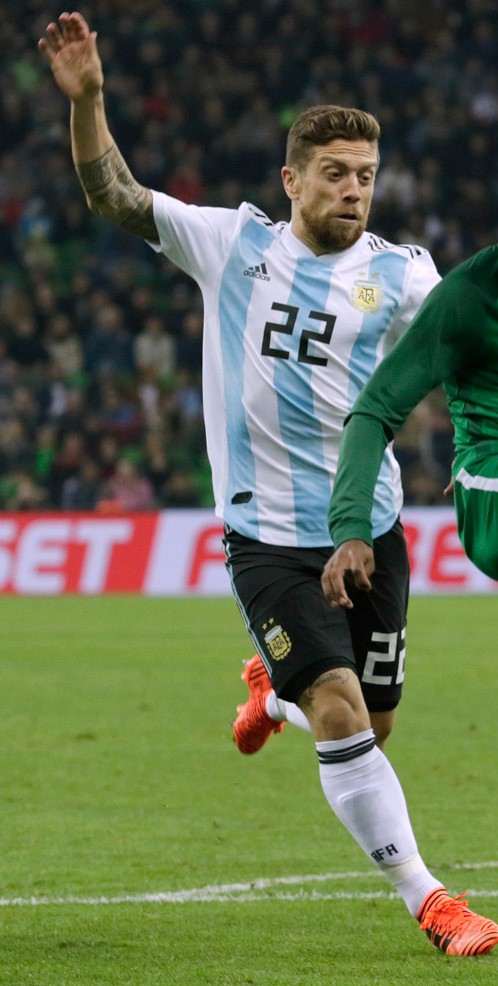
Gómez playing for Argentina against Nigeria in 2017

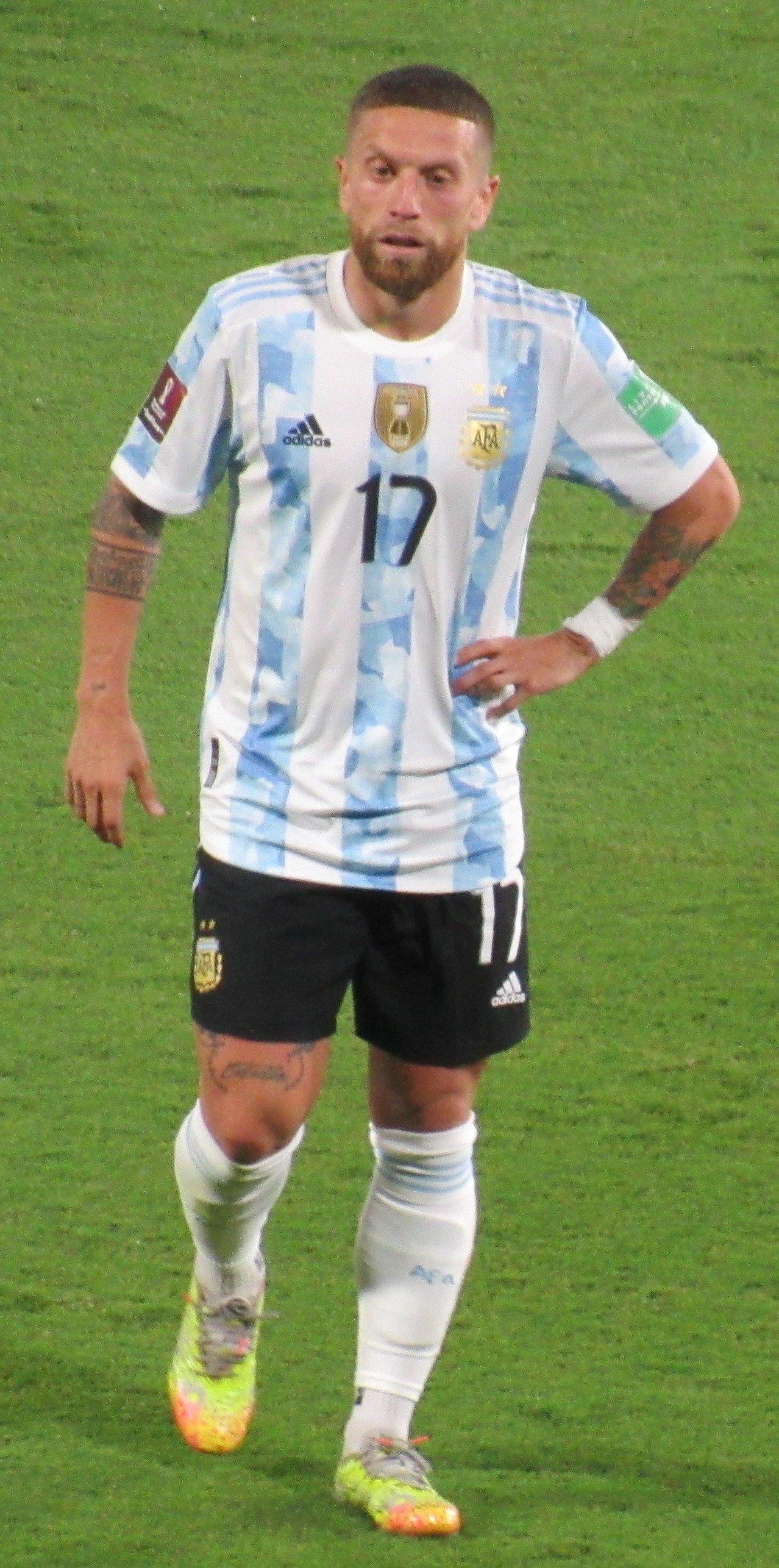
Gómez playing for Argentina in 2022

In 2007, Gómez was picked to represent the Argentina under-20 team at the 2007 South American Youth Championship in Paraguay. Later that year he was in the Argentina squad that won the 2007 FIFA U-20 World Cup in Canada.

Having only played internationally for Argentina at youth level, dual citizenship was widely believed to have qualified him for selection to the senior Italy national team, for whom he had expressed interest in playing. FIFA has since ruled him ineligible to switch his football nationality, however, because he did not have a dual passport when he first represented Argentina at that level, and does not have Italian lineage, which would have allowed him to override this requirement.

On 19 May 2017, Gómez received his first senior call-up by newly appointed coach Jorge Sampaoli for Argentina's friendlies against Brazil and Singapore in June. He made his senior international debut in the match against Singapore on 13 June, helping Argentina to a 6–0 away win, and also marked his debut by scoring his first international goal, while also setting up a goal for Federico Fazio during the same match. He went to make three more international appearances that year.

In June 2021, Gómez was included in Argentina's squad for the 2021 Copa América in Brazil. On 21 June, he scored the only goal of the match in Argentina's third group match against Paraguay; the result allowed his side to progress to the quarter-finals. A week later, he scored again in a 4–1 win against Bolivia in his team's final group stage match, also helping to win a penalty, which was converted by Lionel Messi.

Gómez was included in Argentina's final 26-man squad for the 2022 FIFA World Cup, starting his nations's opening game against Saudi Arabia and in the Round of 16 against Australia. Argentina went all the way to win a third world title after defeating France on penalties in the final.

The national team's first two friendlies after the World Cup would take place in March 2023 in their native Argentina. Gómez would be the only member of the World Cup-winning squad who would not be present during those games, as Sevilla did not allow him to travel due to an injury he sustained.

== Style of play ==
Gómez is a diminutive player with a low centre of gravity who possesses acceleration. A creative and versatile footballer, he is noted for his dribbling ability, pace, and high work-rate.

Possessing good movement and a powerful and accurate long range shot with either foot, he is known for his eye for goal from midfield, although he is also capable of creating goalscoring opportunities for teammates. A versatile attacker, he is capable of playing in several offensive positions, and has even been deployed as a main striker on occasion, or as a false 9, although he usually plays as a second striker, in a central playmaking role as an attacking midfielder, or as a winger, usually on the left flank, a position which enables him to take on defenders in one on one situations, cut into the centre onto his stronger right foot, and attempt a curling shot at goal, although he was often used on the right wing earlier in his career. Due to his stamina and work-ethic, he has also been deployed in a box-to-box role on occasion. In recent seasons, he has often operated in a free attacking role in the centre, behind another striker, which enables him to link-up with his teammates, roam the pitch at will, change positions with other forwards, lose his markers by dropping off onto the flanks, or find space in the box with his runs and finish off chances; Gómez has described this role as a "false second striker". He is also an accurate free kick taker, and often takes penalties for his team. In addition to his playing ability, Gómez is also known for his leadership qualities, having served as Atalanta's captain.

== Personal life ==
Gómez's uncle is former Club Atlético Independiente defender Hugo Villaverde, who is his mother's brother. Gómez is married to Linda Raff, with whom he has three children.

Gómez is a dual citizen of Argentina and Italy, having been granted an Italian passport during his time at Atalanta.

In October 2023, he was banned for two years after testing positive for a banned substance ahead of the 2022 World Cup.

== Career statistics ==
=== Club ===
As of match played 21 March 2026

Appearances and goals by club, season and competition
Club	Season	League			National cup (Note: Includes Coppa Italia, Ukrainian Cup, Copa del Rey)		Continental		Other		Total	
Club	Season	Division	Apps	Goals	Apps	Goals	Apps	Goals	Apps	Goals	Apps	Goals
Arsenal de Sarandí	2005–06	Argentine Primera División	5	0	0	0	—		—		5	0
Arsenal de Sarandí	2006–07	Argentine Primera División	22	2	0	0	10 (Note: Appearances in Copa Sudamericana)	3	—		32	5
Arsenal de Sarandí	2007–08	Argentine Primera División	32	2	0	0	11 (Note: Seven appearances in Copa Libertadores, four appearances and one goal in Copa Sudamericana)	1	3 (Note: Appearances in Recopa Sudamericana and J.League Cup / Copa Sudamericana Championship)	0	46	3
Arsenal de Sarandí	2008–09	Argentine Primera División	18	8	0	0	—		—		18	8
Arsenal de Sarandí	Total		77	12	0	0	21	4	3	0	101	16
San Lorenzo	2008–09	Argentine Primera División	16	1	0	0	0	0	—		16	1
San Lorenzo	2009–10	Argentine Primera División	32	7	0	0	10 (Note: Five appearances and one goal in Copa Libertadores, five appearances in Copa Sudamericana)	1	—		42	8
San Lorenzo	Total		48	8	0	0	10	1	—		58	9
Catania	2010–11	Serie A	36	4	1	0	—		—		37	4
Catania	2011–12	Serie A	34	4	1	1	—		—		35	5
Catania	2012–13	Serie A	36	8	3	1	—		—		39	9
Catania	Total		106	16	5	2	—		—		111	18
Metalist Kharkiv	2013–14	Ukrainian Premier League	23	3	1	1	0	0	—		24	4
Atalanta	2014–15	Serie A	24	3	1	0	—		—		25	3
Atalanta	2015–16	Serie A	34	7	2	0	—		—		36	7
Atalanta	2016–17	Serie A	37	16	2	0	—		—		39	16
Atalanta	2017–18	Serie A	33	6	4	1	7 (Note: Appearances in UEFA Europa League)	2	—		44	9
Atalanta	2018–19	Serie A	35	7	5	2	6	2	—		46	11
Atalanta	2019–20	Serie A	36	7	1	0	9 (Note: Appearances in UEFA Champions League)	1	—		46	8
Atalanta	2020–21	Serie A	10	4	0	0	6	1	—		16	5
Atalanta	Total		209	50	15	3	28	6	—		252	59
Sevilla	2020–21	La Liga	18	3	3	0	2	0	—		23	3
Sevilla	2021–22	La Liga	29	5	4	1	7 (Note: Five appearances in UEFA Champions League, two appearances in UEFA Europa League)	0	—		40	6
Sevilla	2022–23	La Liga	19	1	0	0	8 (Note: Five appearances in UEFA Champions League, three appearances in UEFA Europa League)	0	—		27	1
Sevilla	Total		66	9	7	1	17	0	—		90	10
Monza	2023–24	Serie A	2	0	0	0	—		—		2	0
Padova	2025–26	Serie B	9	0	0	0	—		—		9	0
Career total			540	98	28	7	76	11	3	0	647	116

=== International ===
Appearances and goals by national team and year
National team	Year	Apps	Goals
Argentina	2017	4	1
Argentina	2018	0	0
Argentina	2019	0	0
Argentina	2020	1	0
Argentina	2021	6	2
Argentina	2022	6	0
Total		17	3

Scores and results list Argentina's goal tally first, score column indicates score after each Gómez goal.

List of international goals scored by Papu Gómez
No.	Date	Venue	Opponent	Score	Result	Competition
1	13 June 2017	Singapore National Stadium, Kallang, Singapore	Singapore	3–0	6–0	Friendly
2	21 June 2021	Estádio Nacional Mané Garrincha, Brasília, Brazil	Paraguay	1–0	1–0	2021 Copa América
3	28 June 2021	Arena Pantanal, Cuiabá, Brazil	Bolivia	1–0	4–1	2021 Copa América

== Honours ==
Arsenal de Sarandí

- Copa Sudamericana: 2007
- Suruga Bank Championship: 2008

Sevilla

- UEFA Europa League: 2022–23

Argentina U20

- FIFA U-20 World Cup: 2007

Argentina

- FIFA World Cup: 2022
- Copa América: 2021
- CONMEBOL–UEFA Cup of Champions: 2022

Individual

- Serie A top assist provider: 2018–19, 2019–20
- Serie A Player of the Month: June 2020, September 2020
- Serie A Best Midfielder: 2019–20
- UEFA Champions League Squad of the Season: 2019–20
- Serie A Team of the Year: 2019–20
