= Ameth Fall =

Senegalese footballer (born 1991)

Lorenzo Benini
Personal information
- Date of birth: 4 April 1991 (age 35)
- Place of birth: Dakar, Senegal
- Height: 1.85 m (6 ft 1 in)
- Position: Forward

Team information
- Current team: Chieti

Youth career
- Cesena

Senior career*
Years	Team	Apps	(Gls)
2010–2011	Cesena	0	(0)
2010–2011	→ Bellaria (loan)	14	(3)
2011	→ Lecco (loan)	8	(3)
2011–2012	Lecco	38	(6)
2012–2014	Catania	0	(0)
2012–2013	→ Bellaria (loan)	17	(6)
2013–2014	→ Rimini (loan)	32	(11)
2014–2015	Barletta	37	(7)
2015–2016	Ischia Isolaverde	3	(1)
2016	Rimini	3	(0)
2016–2017	Fidelis Andria	18	(1)
2017	Como	12	(3)
2018	Caronnese	6	(1)
2018	Sanremese	15	(4)
2019–2020	Lecco	36	(6)
2020–2021	Città di Varese	8	(1)
2021	Cjarlins Muzane	7	(0)
2021	Atletico Terme Fiuggi	26	(13)
2021–2022	Sambenedettese	21	(9)
2022	Porto d'Ascoli	13	(1)
2022–2023	Tivoli	20	(7)
2023–	Chieti	14	(6)
- * Club domestic league appearances and goals as of 20 December 2023

Ameth Fall (born 4 April 1991) is a Senegalese professional footballer who plays as a forward for Italian Serie D Group F club Chieti.

== Club career ==
=== Cesena ===
Born in Dakar, the capital of Senegal, Fall started his European career in Italy for Cesena. He was a member of the Primavera (under-20) reserve squad during the 2009–10 Campionato Nazionale Primavera. In the summer of 2010, Fall was sent on loan to the Lega Pro Seconda Divisione, with Bellaria, where he went on to score 3 goals in 14 league matches during the andata of the 2010–11 Lega Pro Seconda Divisione season. In January 2011, he returned to Cesena and was loaned to Lecco, as part of the negotiation that saw Samuele Buda move in the opposite direction. Lecco also obtained the option to purchase the player outright at the conclusion of the season. After 3 goals in 8 league appearances for the club during the second half of the 2010-11 campaign, Lecco opted to purchase Fall outright in July 2011.

=== Lecco ===
After officially signing outright for Lecco in July 2011, Fall initially failed to break into the team's starting lineup, though he regularly appeared as a substitute. His first start for the club came on 9 October 2011 in a 2–2 home draw with Poggibonsi. He scored his first goal for the club on 6 November 2011 in a 2–1 home win against Santarcangelo. He concluded the 2011–12 Lega Pro Seconda Divisione with 4 goals in 32 league appearances (15 starts), though Lecco was relegated from the professional league in June 2012 due to financial irregularities and thus, Fall was automatically released.

=== Catania ===
On 31 August 2012, Fall was acquired by Serie A club Catania on a free transfer. He was concurrently loaned out to his former club Bellaria on the same day. Upon his return to his former club, Fall debuted on 23 September 2012 in a 1–1 home draw against Fano. His first goals of the 2012–13 season came on 21 October 2012, when he bagged a brace against Milazzo in a 3–1 home victory. Fall also scored two additional braces in a 2–1 victory over Renate on 11 November 2012 and a week later on 18 November 2012 in a 4–4 away draw versus Venezia. After beginning the season brightly, Fall went on an 8-match scoring drought between November and February, before succumbing to a season-ending injury after just 11 minutes during a 2–2 draw with Monza on 3 February 2013. He returned to action in the final match of the season prior to the expiration of his loan deal on 30 June 2013.

On 6 August 2013, Catania officially announced the temporary transfer of the attacker to Rimini in the Lega Pro Seconda Divisione on a season-long loan deal. Fall was simultaneously joined by teammate Francesco Nicastro, who transferred to the fourth division side on a permanent deal.
