= Marco Fiore =

Italian footballer (born 1989)

Personal information
- Date of birth: 2 February 1989 (age 37)
- Place of birth: Menden, Germany
- Height: 1.83 m (6 ft 0 in)
- Position: Midfielder

Youth career
- Sportfreunde Oestrich-Iserlohn
- 2004–2009: Schalke 04

Senior career*
Years	Team	Apps	(Gls)
2007–2009	Schalke 04 II	6	(1)
2009–2010	SV Wilhelmshaven	25	(2)
2010–2012	Milazzo	61	(2)
2012–2015	Catania	0	(0)
2012–2013	→ Bellaria (loan)	14	(0)
2013	→ Gavorrano (loan)	12	(1)
2016	Rot Weiss Ahlen	17	(0)
2016–2018	Viktoria Köln	17	(0)
2018–2019	Rot Weiss Ahlen	24	(0)
Total		176	(6)
- * Club domestic league appearances and goals

Marco Fiore (born 2 February 1989) is an Italian former professional footballer who played as a midfielder.

== Career ==
=== Early career ===
Born in Menden, Germany, Fiore graduated from the youth academy of FC Schalke 04 in 2009. He joined fellow German outfit, SV Wilhelmshaven on a free transfer in July 2009. He made his debut for the club in a 2–2 home draw with Chemnitzer FC on 8 August 2009, and went on to make 26 league appearances for the club during the 2009–10 Regionalliga campaign, scoring one goal. After just one season with the club, Fiore transferred to Italian Lega Pro Seconda Divisione outfit, S.S. Milazzo in August 2010, in what was another free transfer. With the Sicilian outfit, Fiore made 27 appearances in his first season in Italy. He remained with the club for the 2011-12 campaign and made an additional 34 league appearances. In total, Fiore appeared in 61 domestic matches for Milazzo, scoring two goals before being sold to Serie A side, Catania in June 2012.

=== Calcio Catania ===
On 30 June 2012, Fiore officially transferred to Calcio Catania on a free transfer. Ahead of the 2012–13 Serie A campaign, Catania loaned Fiore to the Lega Pro Seconda Divisione with A.C. Bellaria on 30 August 2012. After just 14 league appearances (8 as a starter), Catania recalled the midfielder in January 2013, in order to loan him to U.S. Gavorrano, also of the Italian fourth division, for the remainder of the 2012–13 statistical season. Fiore scored 1 goal in 12 league matches for the club before returning to Catania on 30 June 2013.
