= Pablo Álvarez (Argentine footballer) =

Argentine footballer

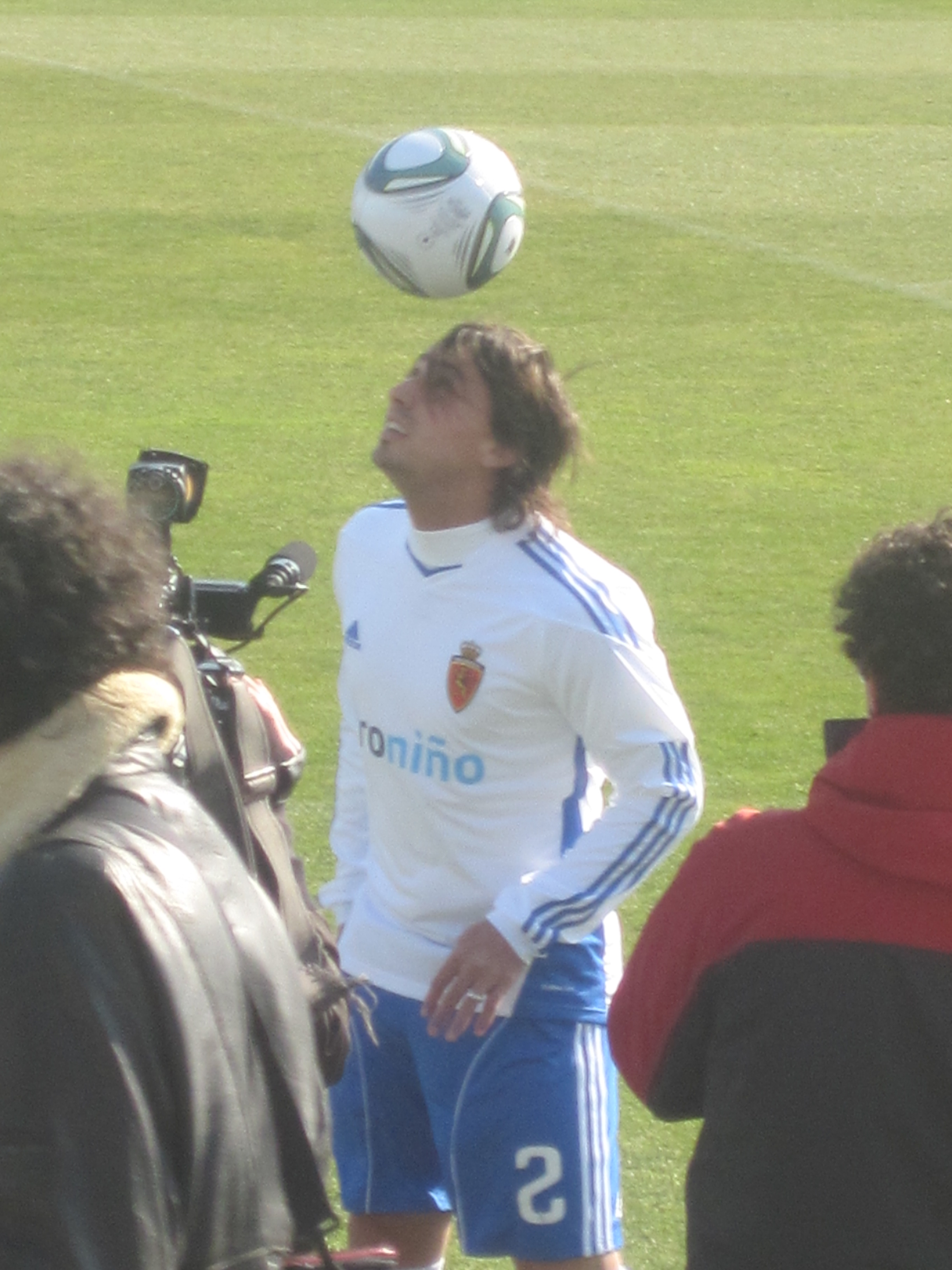
- Álvarez with Zaragoza in 2012

Personal information
- Full name: Pablo Sebastián Álvarez Valeira
- Date of birth: 17 April 1984 (age 42)
- Place of birth: San Martín, Argentina
- Height: 1.76 m (5 ft 9 in)
- Position: Full-back

Youth career
- 1995–1999: Argentinos Juniors
- 1999–2003: Boca Juniors

Senior career*
Years	Team	Apps	(Gls)
2003–2005	Boca Juniors	19	(0)
2005–2007	Estudiantes	59	(2)
2008–2014	Catania	112	(0)
2009	→ Rosario Central (loan)	29	(0)
2012	→ Zaragoza (loan)	15	(0)
2015–2016	Rosario Central	25	(0)
2016–2017	Racing Club	8	(0)
2017–2019	Huracán	19	(1)
2019–2020	Arsenal de Sarandí	0	(0)
- * Club domestic league appearances and goals as of 22:58, 17 September 2019 (UTC)

Pablo Sebastián Álvarez Valeira (born 17 April 1984 in San Martín, Buenos Aires) is an Argentine former football player, who played as a defender. He also holds a Spanish passport in accordance with his descent.

== Club career ==
=== Argentinos Juniors ===
Álvarez came through the youth systems of Argentinos Juniors, starting in 1995, before transferring to Boca Juniors in 1999.

=== Boca Juniors ===
Following his transfer from Argentinos Juniors to Boca Juniors in 1999, Álvarez joined the youth system at the club, before breaking into the Boca first team in 2003, making his league debut. During the 2003–2004 Argentine season, the young defender continued to play in the youth ranks, but made 4 first team appearances, and in 2004 he won his first title by helping Boca to win the Copa Sudamericana. Álvarez continued to impress, and in his first full season with the first team, the fullback made 15 appearances.

=== Estudiantes ===
In July 2005 Álvarez surprisingly left Boca Juniors to join Estudiantes de La Plata, where he won the second title of his career. On 13 December 2006, Álvarez played for Estudiantes against Boca Juniors in a playoff to decide the winner of the Apertura 2006. Estudiantes won the game 2–1 to claim their first league title in 23 years. In just two seasons with the club, Álvarez made 55 appearances for his club, also netting 2 goals. Following his impressive displays during the 2006–07 season, he was linked with a host of European clubs, but remained at Estudiantes over the summer transfer window, making an additional 15 appearances for his club

=== Calcio Catania ===
In January 2008, however, Álvarez joined Sicilian giants Calcio Catania in the Italian Serie A, teaming up with former teammate Matias Silvestre, who also transferred to Catania in January 2008, from Boca Juniors. Under then-coach Silvio Baldini, Álvarez failed to make the imposed impact, and made just 6 league appearances in 5 months. Following the appointment of Walter Zenga, as the new head coach, Álvarez was set to remain at the club for the 2008–09 season, but failed to make an impact yet again, making just 6 additional appearances between August 2008 and January 2009, and thus, was sent out on loan to Rosario Central in order to gain more playing time and game experience. He signed for the Argentine club on 7 January 2009. During his loan spell, the player made 14 league appearances, and returned to Sicily on 30 June 2009.

Under new head coach Siniša Mihajlović, Álvarez became a more valuable player in the squad following the departure of right back Gennaro Sardo, and eventually surpassed Alessandro Potenza for the starting right full back position. Álvarez made over 30 appearances for his Catania, in his return season, and was an undisputed starter for much of the season. He was noted for his big-team peak performances, as he notably kept Argentine star Diego Milito at bay in a 3–1 win for Calcio Catania over Inter Milan at the Stadio Angelo Massimino, as well as Ronaldinho in a 2–2 draw with A.C. Milan at the San Siro. Catania also notably defeated Juventus, in a season, that the team reached a record points total in the Serie A, finishing in 13th position, also making it to the semi-finals of the 2009–10 Coppa Italia. Catania reached a record points total for the third consecutive year during the 2010–11 Serie A season, and again for a fourth consecutive season during the 2011–12 Serie A campaign. During that campaign however, Álvarez was used in just 8 league matches by coach Vincenzo Montella, and on 31 January 2012, Álvarez was loaned out to La Liga club Real Zaragoza for the rest of the season. He made his debut for the club on 12 February 2012, and returned to Catania upon the expiration of his loan deal.

His return to Sicily proved to be very successful; and under new-boss Rolando Maran, Álvarez again established himself as the club's starting right back. He has since featured in 27 official matches for the club, and scored his first goal for i rossazzuri in the 2012–13 Coppa Italia. Álvarez is part of a record-breaking Catania outfit that had picked up 56 points from 38 Serie A matches. This performance saw the club also break its record number of home victories in a single season, its record number of victories overall in a single top flight campaign, as well as its record points total in Serie A for the fifth consecutive season.

=== Return to Rosario ===
After leaving Catania on a free transfer at the start of 2014–15 season, he then rejoined Rosario Central on a permanent transfer in January 2015.

== Honours ==
Boca Juniors

- Copa Sudamericana: 2004

Estudiantes

- Primera Division Argentina: Apertura 2006
