= Giordano Maccarrone =

Italian footballer (born 1990)

Personal information
- Date of birth: 9 April 1990 (age 36)
- Place of birth: Catania, Sicily, Italy
- Height: 1.93 m (6 ft 4 in)
- Position: Centre back

Team information
- Current team: Foggia

Youth career
- 1996–2010: Catania

Senior career*
Years	Team	Apps	(Gls)
2010–2013	Catania	0	(0)
2010–2011	→ Milazzo (loan)	23	(2)
2011–2012	→ Gubbio (loan)	1	(0)
2012–2013	→ Bellaria (loan)	27	(2)
2013–2015	Parma	0	(0)
2013–2014	→ Savona (loan)	22	(1)
2014–2015	→ L'Aquila (loan)	18	(1)
2015–2016	L'Aquila	22	(0)
2016–2017	Messina	29	(1)
2017–2018	Virtus Francavilla	28	(1)
2018–2019	Bisceglie	15	(0)
2019–	Foggia	2	(0)
- * Club domestic league appearances and goals as of 16:30, 13 December 2019 (UTC)

Giordano Maccarrone (born 9 April 1990) is an Italian footballer who plays for Foggia.

== Club career ==
=== Calcio Catania ===
Born in Catania, Sicily, Maccarrone started his career in the youth ranks of hometown club, Calcio Catania. He played within the club's youth ranks from 1996 until 2010 and earned his first senior call-up to the club's first team on 19 April 2009. He officially graduated the club's youth academy in June 2010, although he was immediately sent out on a season-long loan deal to Lega Pro Seconda Divisione outfit, S.S. Milazzo just two months later. The negotiation included a free season loan deal (with performance bonuses from Catania) with option to co-own the player for a fee of €250. Maccarrone made 23 appearances and scored 2 league goals in the 2010–11 Lega Pro Seconda Divisione. On 27 June 2011 Milazzo excised the option to buy half of the registration rights of Maccarrone and Andrea D'Amico for €250 each, as well as €17,600 performance bonus each to counter-weight the wage cost for Milazzo, although Catania opted to re-purchase the full registration rights of the player on 30 June 2011 for €45,000.

On 31 August 2011 Maccarrone was signed by Serie B newcomer A.S.Gubbio on another season-long loan deal from the Sicilian outfit. Maccarrone only played once, however, during the entire 2011-12 Serie B season, and returned to Catania at the end of the campaign.

On 31 August 2012, again the last day of transfer window, Maccarrone left for another fourth division club on loan, joining A.C. Bellaria. A first team regular, Maccarrone managed two goals in 27 appearances for the club, before he again returned to Catania on 30 June 2013.

=== Parma ===
Maccarrone became a free agent on 1 July 2013 but on 18 July signed by fellow Serie A side, Parma F.C. and on 23 July 2013 was sent to Savona F.B.C. in the Lega Pro Prima Divisione on yet another seasonal loan.

=== Foggia ===
On 30 July 2019, he joined Serie D club Foggia.
