= Giuseppe Messina =

Italian footballer

Personal information
- Date of birth: 12 February 1993 (age 33)
- Place of birth: Enna, Italy
- Height: 1.86 m (6 ft 1 in)
- Position: Goalkeeper

Team information
- Current team: Enna Calcio

Youth career
- Catania

Senior career*
| Years | Team | Apps | (Gls) |
| 2011–2013 | Catania | 0 | (0) |
| 2011–2012 | → Milazzo (loan) | 17 | (0) |
| 2013–2014 | Pro Patria | 11 | (0) |
| 2014–2015 | Reggiana | 4 | (0) |
| 2017–2018 | ASD Troina | 1 | (0) |
| 2018 | Siracusa | 11 | (0) |
| 2019– | Enna | | |
- * Club domestic league appearances and goals as of 30 December 2018

Giuseppe Messina (born 12 February 1993) is an Italian footballer who plays for Enna Calcio.

== Biography ==
Messina was a youth product of Calcio Catania. Messina was a player in their under-15 team in the 2007–08 season. After a loan to Milazzo, Messina returned to Catania. He served as the backup keeper of the first team, as well as the first choice of the reserve team, as one of the four overage players.

On 28 July 2013, Messina was signed by Lega Pro Prima Divisione club Pro Patria in a co-ownership deal. At the same time the club sold keeper Andrea Sala to Ternana in a temporary deal. Messina played 11 games in the 2013–14 Lega Pro Prima Divisione season, while Ivano Feola played 19 times. In June 2014, the co-ownership was renewed.

However, on 22 July 2014 Messina was signed by Reggiana in a three-year contract, one day after the signing of Feola. The club also sold Sala to Ternana on 25 July, and Reggiana signed Sala on 1 July. Once again, Messina was an understudy of Feola.

In the 2015–16 season, Messina was released.

On 1 August 2018, he joined Serie C club Siracusa. In October 2019, Messina joined Enna Calcio.
