= Giovanni Marchese (footballer) =

Italian footballer

Personal information
- Date of birth: 17 October 1984 (age 42)
- Place of birth: Caltanissetta, Italy
- Height: 1.82 m (6 ft 0 in)
- Position: Left back

Youth career
- Torino

Senior career*
Years	Team	Apps	(Gls)
2004–2005	Torino	7	(0)
2004–2005	→ Treviso (loan)	31	(0)
2005–2010	Chievo	20	(0)
2006	→ Catania (loan)	14	(0)
2008	→ Bari (loan)	19	(1)
2008–2009	→ Salernitana (loan)	34	(0)
2009–2010	→ Catania (loan)	4	(0)
2010–2013	Catania	75	(5)
2013–2016	Genoa	49	(3)
2017–2020	Catania	63	(2)

International career
2004	Italy U20	2	(0)
2005	Italy U21	3	(0)

Managerial career
- 2020–2021: Catania U19
- 2022: Acireale
- * Club domestic league appearances and goals

Giovanni Marchese (born 17 October 1984) is an Italian football coach and a former player who played as a left back.

== Club career ==
=== Torino ===
Born in Caltanissetta, Sicily, Marchese started his career with the youth system of Serie A side Torino. After Torino were relegated in 2003, Marchese occasionally received call-up from first team, and made 7 appearances since April 2004. He was the member of Primavera Under-20 team in 2003–04 season. In 2004, he was loaned out to Serie B side Treviso along with Riccardo Pagliuchi in order to gain experience, and with Treviso he managed 31 appearances in just one season and in 2005 he returned to Turin. But Torino's financial made the club went bankrupt and its promotion to Serie A was canceled. All players were allowed to leave for free and a new team was formed in Serie B as successor. Marchese and teammate Andrea Mantovani joined Chiveo in August 2005.

=== Chievo Verona and Calcio Catania ===
After his loan return to Torino, Marchese was instantly sold to Serie A rivals Chievo, in 2005. After a short spell with the Chievo Verona first team, the player was sent out on loan to the-Serie B side, Catania for the remaining six months of the 2005–2006 season. In his time with Catania, he made 14 appearances helping the Sicilian giants win promotion into the Serie A for the first time in just over two decades. After returning to Verona in the summer of 2006, Marchese remained at the club for the 2006–07 Serie A season. However, after finishing fifth in the league just a year earlier the Verona-based club were relegated to Serie B for the 2007–2008 season. He remained at the club for the first six months of their Serie B campaign, however, he was loaned out to fellow Serie B side Bari for the remaining half of the 2007–08 Serie B season. ChievoVerona did win promotion back to the Italian top flight that season. On 1 July 2006, Marchese returned to Verona for their Serie A and UEFA Cup campaign, but just made 9 league appearances. He followed the team relegated to Serie B after the club slipped form 4th in 2005–06 season (post- trail) to 18th in 2006–07. He remained at the club for the first six months of their Serie B campaign, and made 11 league appearances. On 1 February 2008, he was loaned out to fellow Serie B side Bari for the remaining half of the season.

=== Loans to AS Bari and Salernitana ===
In his six-month spell with Bari, Marchese managed a total of 19 appearances with one goal credited to his name. In the summer of 2008, he returned to Verona, but again was loaned out. He was loaned to newly promoted Serie B outfit, Salernitana, where, in one season, the young defender appeared an impressive 34 times. In July 2009 he returned to Chievo.

On 1 July 2008, Marchese returned to Chievo again, but immediately left out from Chievo's Serie A campaign, as the club won promotion as champion. On 7 August 2008, he was loaned to newly promoted Serie B outfit, Salernitana At Salerno, he played 34 league matches.

=== Return to Catania ===
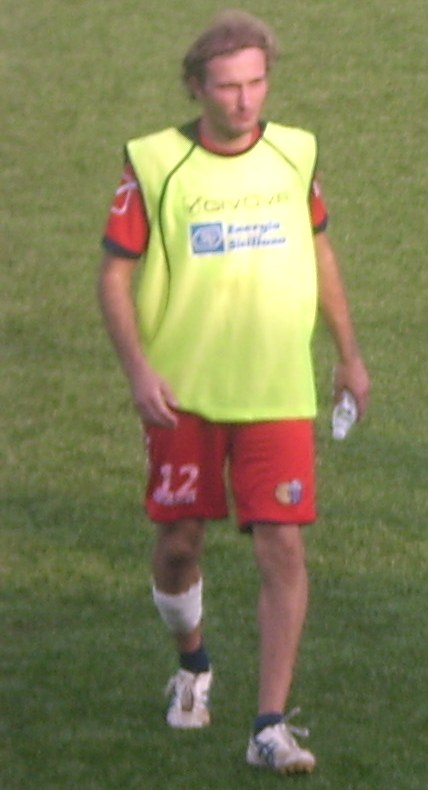
Marchese at Catania

On 31 August 2009, the final day of the 2009 summer transfer window, Marchese was sent to Catania, in exchange for right back, Gennaro Sardo. Sardo's transfer was somewhat of a surprise, due to the fact that he had been consistently included in Catania's starting XI for the past few seasons. Marchese made just 5 appearances in the entire 2009–10 Serie A season.

On 29 June 2010, Sardo permanently transferred to Chievo and Marchese permanently transferred to Catania ahead of the 2010–11 Serie A season. After spending much of the 2010–11 Serie A season as a reserve for veteran Ciro Capuano at left back, Marchese finally was able to obtain frequent game time under new head coach Vincenzo Montella during the 2011–12 campaign, in-part due to a series of injuries which have limited Capuano to minimal availability. The left-back is part of a record-breaking Catania outfit that had picked up 56 points from 38 Serie A matches. This performance saw the club also break its record number of home victories in a single season, its record number of victories overall in a single top flight campaign, as well as its record points total in Serie A for the fifth consecutive season.

=== Genoa and return to Catania ===
In the summer of 2013 he moved to Genoa; in January 2017 back again to play in Catania.

== Coaching career ==
On 27 August 2020, Catania announced that Marchese retired from playing and was appointed coach for the youth squad of the club.

By 2022 he serves as head of the unrecognized Sicily national football team.

In July 2022, Marchese was appointed new head coach of Serie D club Acireale, being however sacked on 3 October 2022 after only three games in charge.

== Honours ==
Champion

- Serie B: 2008 (Chievo)

Runner-up

- Serie B: 2005 (Torino), 2006 (Catania)
