= Sergio Garufi =

Italian footballer

Personal information
- Full name: Sergio Agatino Garufi
- Date of birth: 16 September 1995 (age 31)
- Place of birth: Giarre, Italy
- Height: 1.78 m (5 ft 10 in)
- Position: Midfielder

Team information
- Current team: Modica
- Number: 5

Youth career
- 1999–2005: Calatabiano
- 2005–2014: Catania

Senior career*
Years	Team	Apps	(Gls)
2014–2015	Catania	8	(0)
2015	→ Santarcangelo (loan)	12	(0)
2015–2016	Feralpisalò	3	(0)
2016	Catanzaro	7	(0)
2016–2017	Lupa Roma	31	(0)
2017–2018	Reggina	10	(0)
2018–2019	Matera	14	(0)
2019–2021	Latina	15	(0)
2021–2023	Flaminia	61	(2)
2023–2025	Ragusa	65	(1)
2025–2026	Messina	34	(0)
2026–	Modica	0	(0)
- * Club domestic league appearances and goals as of 27 September 2026

Sergio Agatino Garufi (born 16 September 1995) is an Italian footballer who plays as a midfielder for Serie D club Modica.

== Club career ==
Born in Giarre, Garufi began his career on Catania's youth categories, and was promoted to main squad for 2013–14 season, receiving the no. 39 jersey.

On 15 January 2014 Garufi made his professional debut, coming on as a second-half substitute in a 1–4 home loss against Siena, for the campaign's Coppa Italia.

On 2 February 2015 he was signed by Santarcangelo in a temporary deal.

On 23 September 2015 Garufi was signed by Feralpisalò as a free agent. On 22 January 2016 he left for Catanzaro.

On 25 August 2016 he was signed by Lupa Roma.

In August 2018, he signed with Matera in the Serie C. He left the club at the end of February 2019 and was without club until November 2019, where he joined Serie D club Latina.
