= Simone Caruso =

Italian footballer

Personal information
- Full name: Simone Caruso
- Date of birth: 9 September 1994 (age 32)
- Place of birth: Catania, Italy
- Height: 1.71 m (5 ft 7 in)
- Position: Winger

Team information
- Current team: Sporting Pedara

Youth career
- –2014: Catania

Senior career*
Years	Team	Apps	(Gls)
2014–2015	Catania	1	(0)
2014–2015	→ Martina Franca (loan)	22	(1)
2015–2016	Noto	32	(5)
2016	Castrovillari	5	(0)
2016–2017	Pro Favara		
2017–2018	Biancavilla 1990		
2018	Atletico Catania		
2018–2019	Paternò		
2019–	Sporting Pedara		
- * Club domestic league appearances and goals as of 16 December 2016

Simone Caruso (born 9 September 1994) is an Italian footballer who plays as a winger for Eccellenza club Sporting Pedara.

== Club career ==
Caruso is a youth exponent from Catania. He made his Serie A debut on 27 April 2014 in a 4-0 away defeat against Verona.

In the summer 2019, Caruso joined Eccellenza club Sporting Pedara.
