= Gennaro Sardo =

Italian footballer

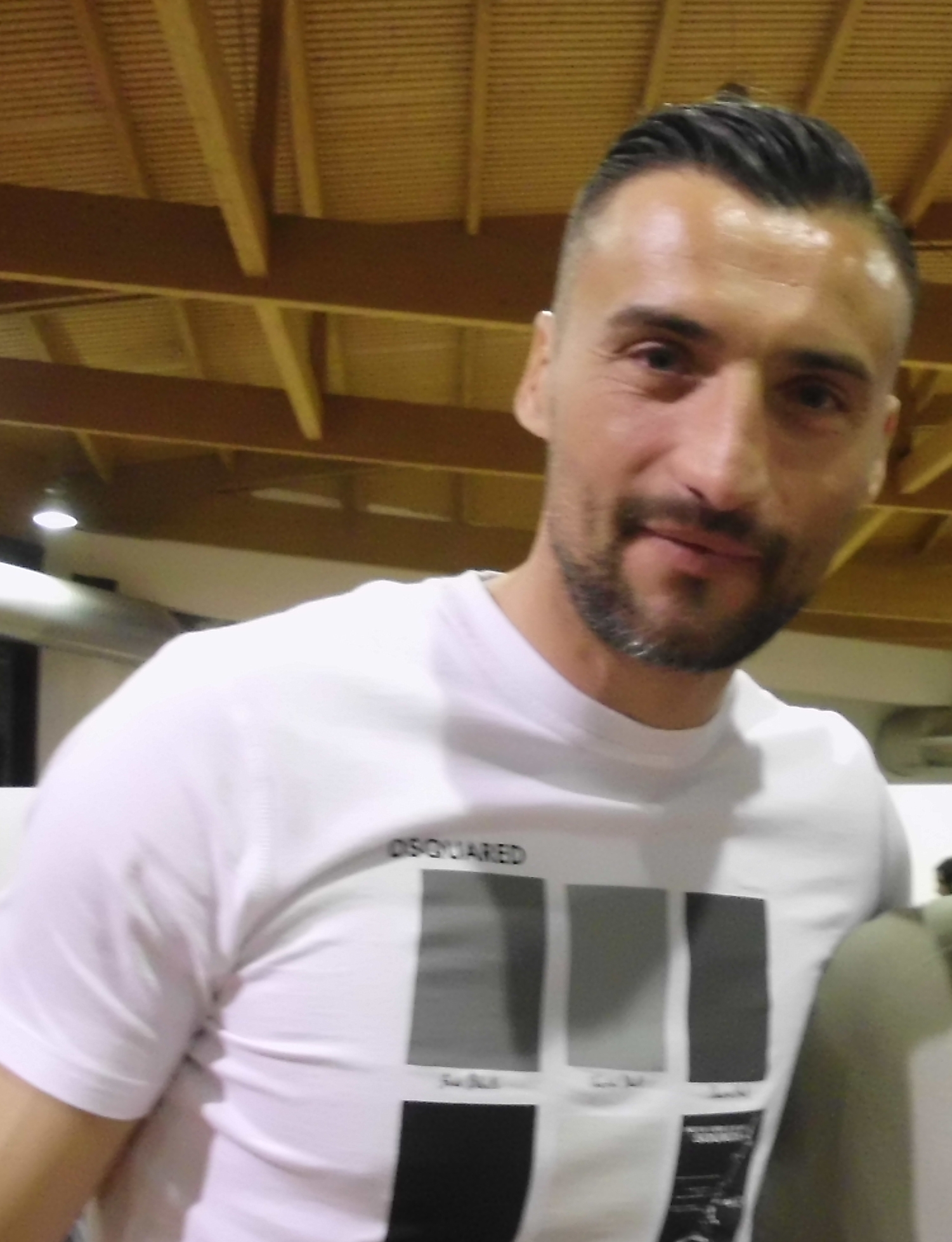
- Gennaro Sardo

Personal information
- Date of birth: 8 May 1979 (age 47)
- Place of birth: Castel Cisterna, Italy
- Height: 1.80 m (5 ft 11 in)
- Position: Right back

Youth career
- –1997: Palmese

Senior career*
| Years | Team | Apps | (Gls) |
| 1997–1999 | Palmese | 25 | (3) |
| 1998 | → Giugliano (loan) | 16 | (0) |
| 1999–2001 | Sant'Anastasia | 30 | (3) |
| 2001–2002 | Terzigno | 26 | (3) |
| 2002–2003 | Salernitana | 17 | (0) |
| 2003–2004 | Avellino | 41 | (1) |
| 2004–2006 | Piacenza | 64 | (2) |
| 2006–2010 | Catania | 55 | (1) |
| 2009–2010 | → Chievo (loan) | 7 | (0) |
| 2010–2017 | Chievo | 139 | (8) |
- * Club domestic league appearances and goals

Gennaro Sardo (born 8 May 1979) is a former Italian footballer who played as a right back.

== Career ==
=== Early career ===
Sardo started his professional career in 1997 when he played for Palmese. In 1998, he moved on loan to Giugliano. He played 16 total games with the club. He would then return to Palmese. In all he managed 3 goals in a total of 25 starts for Palmese. In 1999, Sardo transferred to Sant'Anastasia. In the next two seasons Sardo played 30 games and scored 3 goals. In 2001, he again transferred clubs, this time he moved to Terzigno. At the club he again scored 3 goals, but this time in just 26 appearances.

=== Salernitana and Avellino ===
Sardo moved to Salernitana in 2002. During his single season with the Salerno based club, he made a total of 17 appearances. He moved to nearby rivals Avellino next season. In his season with Avellino, Sardo greatly impressed, appearing 41 times and scoring a single goal.

=== Piacenza ===
In 2004, Sardo moved north to play for Serie B side Piacenza. Over the next two seasons where he totaled 64 appearances and even scored two goals. He was sought after by many clubs following his spell with Piacenza and in 2006, he was sold to newly promoted Serie A side Catania.

=== Catania ===
Sardo officially transferred to newly promoted Catania in August 2006, and made 12 starts in 17 league appearances in his first season with the club, under then-coach Pasquale Marino. Sardo remained with the club for the 2007–2008 Serie A campaign, and broke into the starting line-up under Silvio Baldini. During the course of the season, the right full back made 22 league appearances for the rossazzurri, and also scored his first goal for the club. For the 2008–09 season, Sardo remained as one of the regular starters under Walter Zenga, and made 12 starts in 14 league appearances.

But following the purchase of right back Alessandro Potenza from Genoa, Sardo was sent on loan to Chievo on 31 January 2009 along with teammate Giuseppe Colucci, who found playing time very limited in Sicily.

=== Chievo ===
At Chievo he just played 7 matches as the club had Nicolas Frey, On 1 July 2009, Sardo returned to Catania. He took part in Catania's pre-season and being re-included into Catania's Starting XI, Sardo was chosen to start the Serie A opening game under coach Gianluca Atzori, and a Coppa Italia match a week before.

However, on the final day of the transfer market (31 August), Catania announced that Sardo would move back to Chievo again on loan. The loan was a part exchange deal that saw Chievo left back Giovanni Marchese, move in the opposite direction also on loan. Following the move, Sardo broke into Domenico Di Carlo's starting line-up and was one of the stand-out performers in Chievo's season, notably scoring against Juventus where he scored a scorcher in the 33rd minute to put Chievo ahead in the Serie A clash, while he also poured a load of trouble versus his owners, Catania, in a 1–1 draw. Sardo went on to make 22 league appearances for the Verona based club, scoring 3 goals and shared the right-back role with Nicolas Frey but sometimes featured at right wing-back role when Frey was used as one of the 3 central defender in 4–3–3 formation and even replaced midfielder Michele Marcolini in 2–0 won Fiorentina on 25 April in 3–5–2 formation. On 28 June 2010, both club excised the rights to sign Sardo and Marchese permanently. he signed a 3-year contract.
