= Gonzalo Bergessio =

Argentine footballer (born 1984)

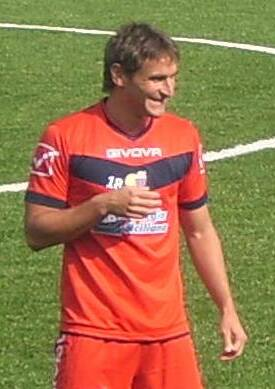
- Bergessio training with Catania in 2011

Personal information
- Full name: Gonzalo Rubén Bergessio
- Date of birth: 20 July 1984 (age 42)
- Place of birth: Córdoba, Argentina
- Height: 1.78 m (5 ft 10 in)
- Position: Striker

Senior career*
Years	Team	Apps	(Gls)
2000–2003	Platense	90	(28)
2003–2005	Instituto	37	(6)
2005–2007	Racing Club	35	(12)
2007–2008	Benfica	3	(0)
2008–2009	San Lorenzo	52	(23)
2009–2011	Saint-Étienne	49	(5)
2011	→ Catania (loan)	13	(5)
2011–2014	Catania	96	(30)
2014–2015	Sampdoria	23	(1)
2015–2016	Atlas	30	(4)
2016–2017	San Lorenzo	18	(2)
2017	Vélez Sarsfield	4	(2)
2018–2021	Nacional	134	(77)
2022	Platense	24	(3)
2023	Tristán Suárez	29	(7)
Total		637	(205)

International career
2008–2009	Argentina	3	(2)
- * Club domestic league appearances and goals

Gonzalo Rubén Bergessio (Spanish pronunciation: [ɡonˈsalo ruˈβem beɾˈɣesjo]; born 20 July 1984) is an Argentine former professional footballer who played as a striker.

== Club career ==
=== Early career ===
Born in Córdoba, Bergessio started his career in the lower leagues with Club Atlético Platense. In 2005, he was signed by Instituto Atlético Central Córdoba of the Primera División, but at the end of the season Instituto were relegated, and the player was sold to Racing Club de Avellaneda.

Bergessio contributed six goals in the Apertura 2006 and, in the following year's Clausura, continued to score on a regular basis. His pace and workrate made him a fan favourite at the Estadio Juan Domingo Perón, and he notably netted against Boca Juniors and Club Atlético River Plate in the tournament.

=== Benfica, return to Argentina ===
On 26 June 2007, Bergessio signed a five-year deal with Primeira Liga club S.L. Benfica for a reported €2.5 million fee, as an unknown party remained eligible to 50% of the future transfer fee the Portuguese received. He only appeared in three league matches during his spell, one more than his opportunities in the UEFA Champions League, and returned to his country in January of the following year.

In January 2008, Bergessio joined San Lorenzo de Almagro. On 8 May, he was involved in the Copa Libertadores tie against River where, after his team had two players sent off and were 2–0 down, he scored twice to give it an improbable aggregate win.

=== Saint-Étienne ===
On 25 August 2009, Bergessio returned to Europe by agreeing to a four-year contract with France's AS Saint-Étienne, for an undisclosed fee. He scored his first goal in his second appearance, a 1–1 Ligue 1 home draw with AJ Auxerre, but netted just four times more in his one-and-a-half-season stint.

=== Catania ===
In the last hours of the 2011 winter transfer window, Bergessio joined Italian side Calcio Catania, arriving on loan for the remainder of the season – the Sicilians had the option to sign him player permanently at the conclusion of this loan agreement. He made his Serie A debut on 20 February, playing the full 90 minutes and being booked in a 1–0 away loss to SSC Napoli.

After an initial delay in the transfer, Bergessio signed a permanent four-year contract on 29 August 2011 for €945,000. In the 2012–13 campaign, he became a key part of Rolando Maran's team, forming an efficient attacking partnership with countrymen Pablo Barrientos, Lucas Castro and Papu Gómez; he scored his first hat-trick in Italy's top flight on 5 May 2013, in the 3–0 home win over AC Siena.

Bergessio helped Catania eventually finish in eighth position, with a record in total points for the fifth consecutive season. On a personal level he was also the club's highest scorer during a single campaign, since Gionatha Spinesi netted 17 times in 2006–07.

On 30 October 2013, Bergessio suffered a broken fibula as a result of a late tackle by Giorgio Chiellini in a 4–0 defeat at Juventus FC.

=== Sampdoria ===
On 1 August 2014, Bergessio was sold to UC Sampdoria of the same country and league for a fee of €2.65 million, putting pen to paper to a three-year deal. On 3 June of the following year, after 24 appearances in all competitions and two goals, he was released by mutual consent.

=== Later years ===
Bergessio moved teams and countries again on 24 June 2015, joining Atlas F.C. from Mexico. The following 8 September, he signed a one-year deal with former club San Lorenzo.

== International career ==
Bergessio made his debut for Argentina on 15 October 2008, playing the second half of a 1–0 loss in Chile for the 2010 FIFA World Cup qualifiers. He scored his first and only two goals for his country on 20 May of the following year, in a 3–1 victory against Panama.

== Career statistics ==
=== International ===
Appearances and goals by national team and year
National team	Year	Apps	Goals
Argentina	2008	1	0
Argentina	2009	2	2
Total		3	2

Scores and results list Argentina's goal tally first, score column indicates score after each Bergessio goal.

List of international goals scored by Gonzalo Bergessio
No.	Date	Venue	Opponent	Score	Result	Competition
1	20 May 2009	Estadio Brigadier General Estanislao López, Santa Fe, Argentina	Panama	2–1	3–1	Friendly
2	20 May 2009	Estadio Brigadier General Estanislao López, Santa Fe, Argentina	Panama	3–1	3–1	Friendly
