= Alessandro Potenza =

Italian footballer (born 1984)

Personal information
- Date of birth: 8 March 1984 (age 42)
- Place of birth: San Severo, Italy
- Height: 1.85 m (6 ft 1 in)
- Position: Right back

Youth career
- Inter Milan

Senior career*
Years	Team	Apps	(Gls)
2002–2006	Inter Milan	0	(0)
2003	→ Ancona (loan)	1	(0)
2004	→ Parma (loan)	29	(0)
2005	→ Chievo (loan)	4	(0)
2005–2006	→ Mallorca (loan)	17	(0)
2006–2008	Fiorentina	34	(1)
2008–2009	Genoa	12	(0)
2009–2013	Catania	61	(1)
2013–2014	Modena	15	(0)
2014–2015	Foggia	26	(1)
2015–2016	Chennaiyin	10	(0)
2016	Casertana	13	(0)
Total		222	(3)

International career
2002–2003	Italy U19	9	(0)
2003	Italy U20	2	(0)
2004–2007	Italy U21	27	(1)

Managerial career
- 2016–2017: Madre Pietra Daunia
- 2017: Recanatese
- 2018–2019: Fidelis Andria
- 2019: Audace Cerignola
- 2020: Arezzo
- 2022: Bitonto
- 2026–: Melfi
Medal record
Men's football
Representing Italy
UEFA European Under-21 Championship
Winner	2004 Germany
- * Club domestic league appearances and goals

Alessandro Potenza (born 8 March 1984) is an Italian football coach and a former professional footballer who plays as a right back. He is currently as a head coach for Italian Serie D club Melfi

== Club career ==
=== Inter Milan ===
Potenza came from the youth system of Inter Milan and was called up to the first team squad for the 2002–03 Serie A season. He only made one appearance for Inter's first team in a Coppa Italia match against Bari, 4 December 2002.

=== Loan spells ===
In 2003, Potenza was loaned out to Serie B side Ancona to gain experience. After finding playing time limited at Ancona, he was loaned out to Serie A outfit Parma. With Parma, he found more success and plenty of first team action. In 2005, Inter loaned him out to ChievoVerona, another Serie A side. After another decent campaign, Spanish side Mallorca wanted to bring Potenza out to La Liga; however, Inter opted to loan him out. After another fairly impressive season, he caught the eye of Serie A side Fiorentina, who wanted to bring the player back to Italy.

=== Fiorentina and Genoa ===
In 2006, Fiorentina made a bid for the player and Inter decided to sell the young talent for €1.25 million. In his early stages with the Tuscan team, he found plenty of playing time and even some first team action. During the 2007–08 Serie A season, Potenza found playing time very hard to find and was seldom used in the starting XI. In the summer of 2008, Fiorentina decided to sell the player to Genoa. In the first half of the 2008–09 Serie A season, Potenza also found playing time hard to come by.

=== Catania ===
During the 2009 winter transfer market, Potenza was seeking a transfer away from Liguria. On 31 January 2009, it was confirmed that Potenza had joined Catania in a co-ownership deal. He was brought in to strengthen the defensive line of the Southern Italian team who were pushing for UEFA Cup football. As a result of his arrival, Gennaro Sardo was sent out on loan from Catania to relegation battlers ChievoVerona. Potenza instantly earned his starting place under then-coach Walter Zenga and began the new season as a starter under Gianluca Atzori.

After a mid-season injury, the right back failed to obtain regular first team action in the team under coach Siniša Mihajlović, who led Catania from 20th to 12th in the 2010–11 Serie A league table in his first five months in charge. In August 2011, Catania signed the full ownership of the right back, and he would go on to make 20 league appearances for the club that season. During the 2011–12 Serie A season under Vincenzo Montella and the 2012–13 Serie A campaign under Rolando Maran, Potenza struggled for game time, appearing just eleven times in league competition over the course of those two seasons. Catania broke the club's all-time points record total in the five consecutive seasons that Potenza had been with the team.

== International career ==
Potenza earned nine caps with Italy U19, as well as two caps for Italy U20. His international career took off with Italy U21, where he made a total of 27 appearances and scored one goal.

== Coaching career ==
In August 2018, Potenza was hired as head coach of Fidelis Andria in Serie D. On 29 July 2019, he moved to Audace Cerignola, also in Serie D. On 26 August 2020, he was hired by Serie C club Arezzo. On 19 October 2020, he was dismissed by Arezzo after the club only gained 1 point in the first five league games of the season.

== Honours ==
Chennaiyin

- Indian Super League: 2015

== Awards ==
- 2003 UEFA U-19 Championship
- 2004 UEFA U-21 Championship
