= Sergio Almirón (footballer, born 1980) =

Argentine footballer (born 1980)

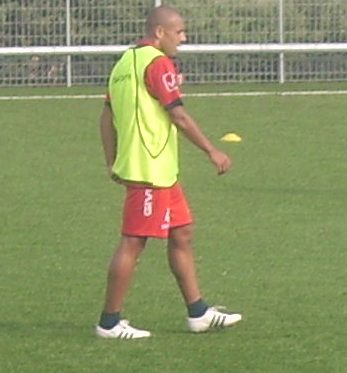

Personal information
- Full name: Sergio Bernardo Almirón
- Date of birth: 7 November 1980 (age 45)
- Place of birth: Rosario, Argentina
- Height: 1.80 m (5 ft 11 in)
- Position: Central midfielder

Team information
- Current team: Akragas (technical area coordinator)

Youth career
- Newell's Old Boys

Senior career*
Years	Team	Apps	(Gls)
1998–2001	Newell's Old Boys	16	(1)
2001–2004	Udinese	12	(0)
2003–2004	→ Verona (loan)	16	(1)
2004–2007	Empoli	95	(18)
2007–2010	Juventus	10	(1)
2008	→ Monaco (loan)	11	(2)
2008–2009	→ Fiorentina (loan)	11	(0)
2009–2010	→ Bari (loan)	27	(5)
2010–2011	Bari	25	(0)
2011–2015	Catania	81	(9)
2015	Akragas	7	(0)
Total		311	(37)
- * Club domestic league appearances and goals

Sergio Bernardo Almirón (born 7 November 1980) is an Argentine former footballer who played as a central midfielder known for his passing and powerful shots.

He is currently a non-playing staff member at Lega Pro club Akragas.

== Club career ==
=== Newell's Old Boys ===
Almirón began his professional career with Argentine club Newell's Old Boys. After making his debut for the club at the age of 18, Almirón managed 16 further league appearances for the club, before being sold to Italian side, Udinese, in 2001.

=== Udinese ===
Following his official transfer to Udinese in the summer of 2001, Almirón was instantly inserted into the club's first team, however, was limited to just 12 league appearances. Due to his young age and lack of first team experience, Udinese opted to loan the young midfielder to Serie B outfit, Hellas Verona FC in 2003. Almirón went on to make 16 league appearances for the club, also scoring a single goal. Following a successful loan spell, Almirón returned to Udinese at the conclusion of the season.

=== Empoli ===
In the summer of 2004, Empoli bought 50 percent of the player's rights from Udinese, following the loan spell in Verona, Almirón instantly became an integral part of the Empoli setup and played a vital role in their bid for Serie A promotion and survival in top-flight. Following two impressive seasons with the Tuscan club, Empoli finally bought his contract outright from Udinese in June 2006. Almirón retained his place within the Empoli first team during the 2006–07 Serie A season, and following a highly impressive campaign, the midfielder was scouted by and sold to Serie A giants Juventus FC, who had recently returned to Serie A after being demoted due to the Calciopoli scandal.

=== Juventus ===
Almirón transferred to Juventus in June 2007 for €9 million. Juventus were rebuilding the squad after spending a season in Serie B and he and new signing Portuguese midfielder Tiago Mendes were expected to be the main central midfield pairing. He was unable to maintain a place in the starting eleven in favour of the likes of Cristiano Zanetti and Antonio Nocerino. After making just 9 Serie A appearances in 5 months, Almirón was sent out on loan. In January 2008, he was loaned out to Ligue 1 side AS Monaco for the remainder of the campaign. At Monaco, Almirón made 11 appearances and scored 2 goals in the second half of the 2007–08 Ligue 1 season, before returning to Juventus on 30 June 2008. Upon his return, Almirón found himself even further down the pecking order following the arrivals of Mali international, Mohamed Sissoko and also Danish midfielder Christian Poulsen. Juventus coach Claudio Ranieri again deemed the player a surplus to requirements, and again opted to send the midfielder out on loan. Fiorentina signed him in July 2008, and obtained the option to buy his contract outright at the end of the season. Following yet another dismal campaign, in which Almirón made just 11 appearances, however, Fiorentina declined the option to make his stay permanent and he again returned to Turin.

The emergence of youngster Claudio Marchisio during the 2008–09 season and the arrival of Brazilian duo Diego and Felipe Melo during the summer ended any new possibilities of a second chance of becoming a regular at the club. On 20 August 2009, he signed for newly promoted Serie A outfit Bari on loan.

=== Bari ===
Almirón officially transferred to Bari on 20 August 2009, on a season-long loan agreement. He instantly gained a first team place, where he appeared in 27 league matches and notched 5 league goals, his best tally since departing from Empoli in 2007. In June 2010, Bari signed him in co-ownership agreement, with Juventus, as part of the deal the saw Leonardo Bonucci transfer in the opposite direction, to Juventus. On 14 July 2010, Juventus confirmed the fee which was announced at €2.5 million. Juventus also announced in its financial report that the accounting value of the remain 50% rights in hand worth €1.699 million, half of un-amortized transfer fee of €3.399 million on 30 June 2010. (around 2/5 of €8.497million original transfer fee in accounting)

In his second season with the club, Almirón and his midfield partner Massimo Donati failed to produce the same spark that led the club to a 10th-place finish in the previous season. This was in part due to a series of injuries which limited Almirón to just 25 league appearances with no goals. Bari's season ended in relegation, with a 20th-place finish.

In July 2011, the player officially returned to Juventus after the bianconeri paid a peppercorn fee to purchase back the remaining 50% of the player's contract. However, he was not listed in the club's first team plans under new coach Antonio Conte, and hence was left out of the first team squad and was not assigned a squad number.

=== Catania ===
On 27 August 2011, Almirón officially transferred to Catania for €400,000 (€391,000 in accounting) in a three-year deal. Juventus also write-down €1.308 million as part of the remaining value of his contract, from €1.699 million to €391,000, backdated to 2010–11 financial year, made no cost nor profit registered in 2011–12 season. Almirón is one of 12 new squad members ahead of the 2011–12 Serie A season, 9 of which were purchases. He has since returned to the heights of his playing form and has been a regular in the Catania line-up, scoring 4 goals in 32 league appearances in his first season with the club.

Almiròn was part of a record-breaking Catania outfit that picked up 56 points from 38 league matches in 2012–13 Serie A season.

In June 2013 he extended his contract to 30 June 2015. However, on 23 February 2015 the contract was terminated in mutual consent.

=== Akragas ===
In 2015, Almirón accepted an offer from newly promoted Lega Pro club Akragas to play under new head coach Nicola Legrottaglie, a former teammate of his at Juventus. His playing stint at the Sicilian club, however, lasted only a few months. On 15 December 2015, Akragas announced Almirón's immediate retirement from active football with him joining the non-playing staff as a technical area coordinator.

== Personal life ==
Almirón is the son of former Newell's Old Boys and Argentine forward Sergio Omar Almirón.
