= Francesco Lodi =

Italian footballer (born 1984)

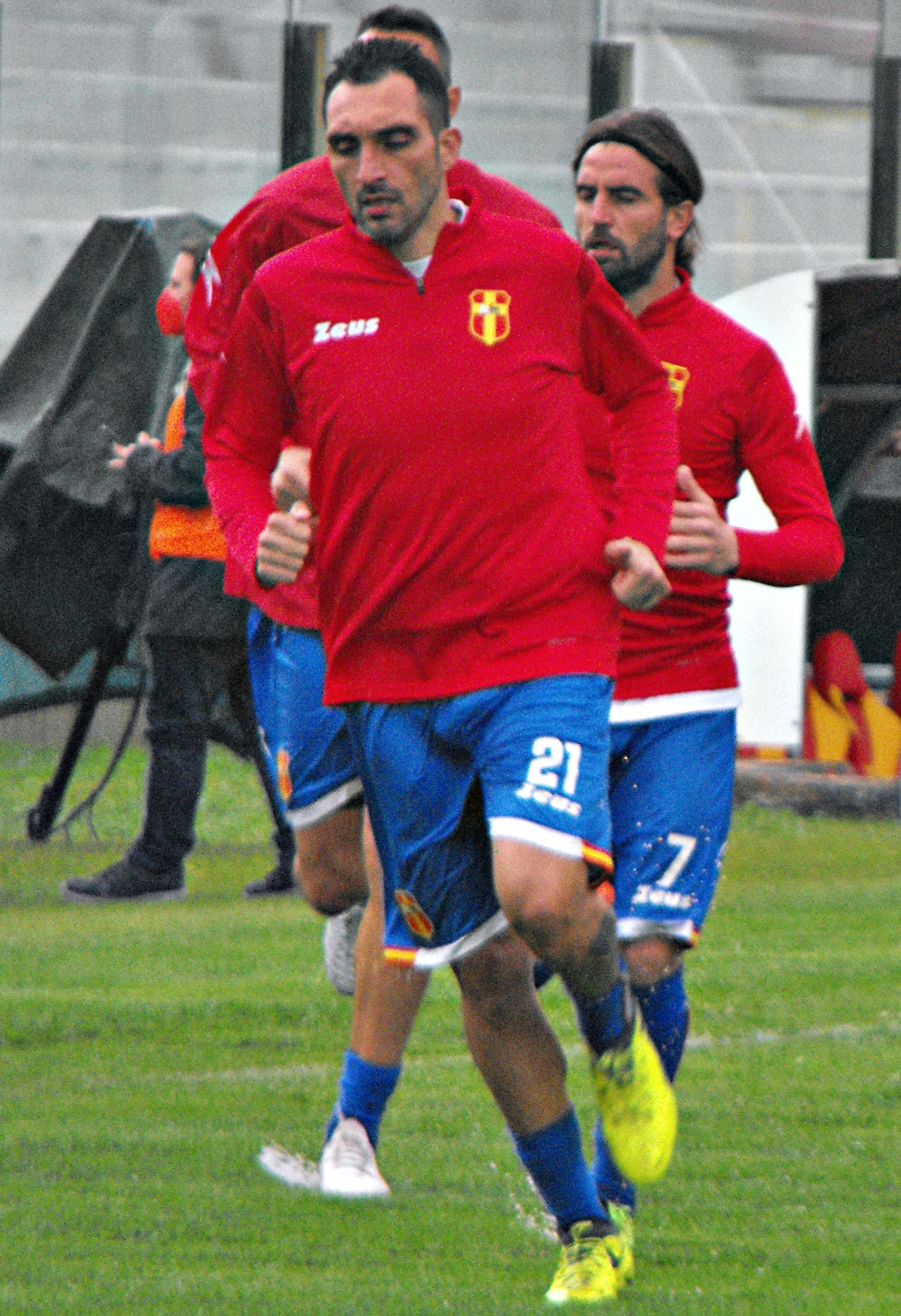
- Lodi with Messina

Personal information
- Date of birth: 23 March 1984 (age 42)
- Place of birth: Naples, Italy
- Height: 1.83 m (6 ft 0 in)
- Position: Midfielder

Youth career
- Empoli

Senior career*
Years	Team	Apps	(Gls)
2000–2010	Empoli	89	(19)
2004	→ Vicenza (loan)	11	(0)
2006–2008	→ Frosinone (loan)	82	(31)
2009–2010	→ Udinese (loan)	19	(1)
2010–2011	Frosinone	23	(7)
2011–2013	Catania	86	(18)
2013–2014	Genoa	9	(2)
2014–2015	Catania	19	(2)
2014–2015	→ Parma (loan)	23	(2)
2015–2017	Udinese	25	(1)
2017–2020	Catania	88	(26)
2020–2021	Triestina	24	(2)
2021	FC Messina	20	(12)
2021–2022	Acireale	24	(5)
2022–2023	Catania	30	(4)

International career
2000	Italy U15	8	(0)
2000–2001	Italy U16	13	(7)
2002	Italy U18	6	(3)
2002–2003	Italy U19	12	(11)
2006–2007	Italy U21	2	(0)
- * Club domestic league appearances and goals

Francesco Lodi (born 23 March 1984) is an Italian former professional footballer who played as a midfielder. He usually played as a deep-lying playmaker, and was known for his passing qualities and free-kick skills.

== Club career ==
=== Empoli ===
Lodi started his career as part of Empoli youth system, being later promoted to the first team in 2003, despite his senior debut came during the 2000–01 season. During the winter transfer market, Empoli opted to loan the player out to Vicenza, in Serie B, for the player to gain regular playing time. He went on to make 11 appearances for the biancorossi before returning to Empoli for the 2004–05 season, following their relegation. In his first full season with the Tuscan side, Lodi made 27 league appearances, scoring six goals and helping them earn instant promotion back to Serie A. Lodi remained with Empoli, his first full season in Serie A. The midfielder made just 17 appearances, however, and failed to hold down first team football. He scored no goals.

=== Loan to Frosinone ===
For the 2006–07 season, Empoli loaned Lodi to Serie B side Frosinone for €50,000. Lodi instantly earned a starting role with the club, making 40 appearances out of a possible 42, scoring 11 goals. Despite his form, Empoli opted to keep the player at the Latium-based club in co-ownership deal for €1.4 million, where Lodi would continue his form. He went on to make 41 appearances for the second division side and scored a very impressive 20 goals as a midfielder. In January 2008, Empoli also bought back the 50% registration rights from Frosinone for €800,000.

=== Return to Empoli ===
Following Empoli's relegation from Serie A, the loan was not re-newed and the player spent the 2008–09 season with Empoli. He again performed with high standards, making 41 appearances and scoring 13 goals in league play. His form over the span of three seasons led to interest from a host of Serie A clubs, including Udinese, Atalanta and Chievo. At the start of the 2009–10 season, Lodi scored three goals in the first three games of Empoli's season, later joining Udinese on loan for the remainder of the 2009–10 season.

=== Udinese ===
On 28 August 2009, Lodi officially joined Udinese on loan from Empoli. During the season, Lodi found first team football hard to come by due to the presences of established midfielders Alexis Sánchez, Mauricio Isla, Gökhan Inler and Kwadwo Asamoah. Lodi went on to make 19 league appearances, scoring one goal. Udinese did not use the option to purchase the player outright, and he returned to Empoli on 30 June 2010.

=== Return to Frosinone ===
Following his Serie A top flight experience with Udinese, Lodi returned to Empoli but was instantly sold to Frosinone again on a co-ownership deal, for €300,000. In his return to Frosinone, Lodi returned immediately to first-team football, making 23 appearances (out of a possible 23) and scoring seven goals prior to the January transfer market, in which he again transferred clubs.

=== Catania ===
On 31 January 2011, Catania bought Lodi from Frosinone for €680,000, with Empoli retained 50% registration rights. Lodi also immediately joined Catania for the remainder of the 2010–11 season, in a two-and-a-half-year contract. His first two appearances for the Sicilian side were very low key, but on 13 February 2011, Lodi scored two fantastic free-kicks in a comeback 3–2 victory for Catania over Lecce. Lodi was also the scorer of a stunning free-kick against Juventus in the 96th minute of play, ending the game in a draw for Catania. In June 2011, Catania purchased Lodi outright for another €300,000. (the discount expressed as proventi da compartecipazioni in Catania's account) He has since made 83 league appearances for the club, scoring 18 goals. He also scored three goals in four appearances in the 2012–13 Coppa Italia.

Lodi was part of a record-breaking Catania outfit that picked up 56 points from 38 Serie A matches in 2012–13 season. This performance sees the club also break its record number of home victories in a single season, its record number of victories overall in a single top flight campaign, as well as its record points total in Serie A for the fifth consecutive season.

=== Genoa ===
On 3 July 2013, Catania sent Lodi to Genoa in exchange Panagiotis Tachtsidis in a cashless player swap. Both clubs retained 50% registration rights (co-ownership deal). The deal finalized in mid-July. He joined on a 3-year deal and would wear the number 10 shirt. Genoa had asked Kasabian songwriter, Sergio Pizzorno, if they could take his shirt down from the club in order for Lodi to wear it.

=== Catania (second time) ===
Lodi returned to Catania just six months after leaving the club, scoring a goal and providing an assist for Gonzalo Bergessio in his first match back, helping his club to defeat Bologna 2–0 at the Stadio Angelo Massimino. In June 2014, the co-ownership deal also terminated.

=== Parma ===
Lodi was then loaned to Parma on 25 August 2014.

=== Return to Udinese ===
On 23 September 2015, Lodi rejoined former club Udinese as a free agent. He left the club on 17 February 2017.

=== Catania (third time) ===
After his contract at Udinese got terminated, the director of Catania confirmed on 2 March 2017, that Lodi was the first signing for the 2017–18 season.

=== Triestina ===
On 8 January 2020 he signed a 1.5-year contract with Serie C club Triestina.

=== FC Messina ===
On 22 January 2021, Lodi left Triestina to sign a one-and-a-half-year contract with Serie D club FC Messina.

=== Acireale ===
In August 2021, Lodi signed for Serie D club Acireale.

=== Catania (fourth time) ===
In August 2022, Lodi agreed to return to refounded Serie D club Catania.

After winning the Serie D title with Catania, Lodi was not confirmed as part of the squad for the following 2023–24 Serie C campaign. On 25 July 2023, Lodi announced his retirement from active football.

== International career ==
Lodi was a player of the Italian under-19 team. He took part in 2001 UEFA European Under-16 Championship, the last named as under-16 event.

Due to UEFA U-21 Championship had changed from an even year event to odd year event, new coach Pierluigi Casiraghi called him up as senior member of the squad for 2007 UEFA European Under-21 Championship, eligible to players born 1984 or after. He made his Italy under-21 debut against Croatia in a friendly match on 15 August 2006 at the age of 22. Lodi did not receive a call-up for 2004–06 season of U21.

== Honours ==
Italy U19

- UEFA European Under-19 Championship: 2003

Catania

- Serie D: 2022–23 (Group I)
