= Lucas Castro =

Argentine professional footballer

Personal information
- Full name: Lucas Nahuel Castro
- Date of birth: 9 April 1989 (age 37)
- Place of birth: La Plata, Argentina
- Height: 1.82 m (6 ft 0 in)
- Position: Winger

Team information
- Current team: Aldosivi
- Number: 19

Youth career
- 2003–2008: Gimnasia La Plata

Senior career*
Years	Team	Apps	(Gls)
2008–2011	Gimnasia La Plata	64	(5)
2011–2012	Racing Club	29	(6)
2012–2015	Catania	90	(13)
2015–2018	Chievo	92	(11)
2018–2020	Cagliari	27	(3)
2020	→ SPAL (loan)	7	(0)
2020–2021	SPAL	11	(3)
2021	Fatih Karagümrük	16	(3)
2021–2022	Adana Demirspor	11	(0)
2022–2023	Sarmiento	23	(0)
2023	Huracán	11	(0)
2023–2026	Gimnasia La Plata	78	(3)
2026–	Aldosivi	16	(2)
- * Club domestic league appearances and goals as of 17:47, 6 November 2026 (UTC)

Lucas Nahuel Castro (born 9 April 1989) is an Argentine professional footballer who plays for Aldosivi, as a winger.

== Club career ==
=== Gimnasia La Plata ===
Castro began his career within the youth ranks of Argentine club Gimnasia y Esgrima La Plata in 2003.

After 68 appearances and 6 goals for his hometown club, Castro transferred to Racing Club de Avellaneda.

=== Racing Club ===
In July 2011, Castro completed a transfer to Argentine rivals Racing Club de Avellaneda after being signed by Manager Diego Simeone. Castro played mainly on the left wing, with Mauro Camoranesi usually playing on the right wing. In his only season with the club, he scored 6 goals in 29 league appearances.

=== Calcio Catania ===
On 20 July 2012, Castro signed for Italian Serie A club Catania for €2.5 million on a five-year contract.

=== Chievo Verona ===
On 29 June 2015, Castro signed with Chievo.

=== Cagliari ===
On 30 June 2018, Castro signed with Cagliari.

=== SPAL ===
On 31 January 2020, he joined SPAL on loan. As certain performance conditions were met, SPAL were obligated to purchase his rights.

=== Turkey ===
On 19 January 2021, Castro signed with Turkish club Fatih Karagümrük. In August 2021 he moved to Adana Demirspor.

== International career ==
In 2011, Castro was called up to the Argentina national side by the then-manager Alejandro Sabella for a friendly match against Brazil.

== Career statistics ==
=== Club ===
As of match played 2 August 2020

Appearances and goals by club, season and competition
Club	Season	League			Cup		Europe		Other		Total	
Club	Season	Division	Apps	Goals	Apps	Goals	Apps	Goals	Apps	Goals	Apps	Goals
Gimnasia de La Plata	2008–09	Argentine Primera División	1	0	–		–		–		1	0
Gimnasia de La Plata	2009–10	Argentine Primera División	33	2	–		–		–		33	2
Gimnasia de La Plata	2010–11	Argentine Primera División	30	4	–		–		–		30	4
Gimnasia de La Plata	Total		64	6	0	0	0	0	0	0	64	6
Racing Club	2011–12	Argentine Primera División	29	6	3	1	–		–		32	7
Catania	2012–13	Serie A	36	4	3	0	–		–		39	4
Catania	2013–14	Serie A	29	3	0	0	–		–		29	3
Catania	2014–15	Serie B	25	6	1	0	–		–		26	6
Catania	Total		90	13	4	0	0	0	0	0	94	13
Chievo	2015–16	Serie A	34	3	1	0	–		–		35	3
Chievo	2016–17	Serie A	33	5	2	1	–		–		35	6
Chievo	2017–18	Serie A	25	3	0	0	–		–		25	3
Chievo	Total		92	11	3	1	0	0	0	0	95	12
Cagliari	2018–19	Serie A	12	1	1	0	–		–		13	1
Cagliari	2019–20	Serie A	15	2	2	0	–		–		17	2
Cagliari	Total		27	3	3	0	0	0	0	0	30	3
SPAL (loan)	2019–20	Serie A	7	0	0	0	–		–		7	0
Career total			309	39	13	2	0	0	0	0	322	41
