= Ciro Capuano =

Italian footballer (born 1981)

Personal information
- Full name: Ciro Capuano
- Date of birth: 10 August 1981 (age 45)
- Place of birth: Naples, Italy
- Height: 1.86 m (6 ft 1 in)
- Position: Left back

Youth career
- Empoli

Senior career*
Years	Team	Apps	(Gls)
1999–2000	Empoli	0	(0)
2000–2004	Pisa	99	(7)
2004–2006	Bologna	51	(0)
2006–2009	Palermo	19	(1)
2009	→ Catania (loan)	18	(1)
2009–2015	Catania	113	(2)
2015–2016	Akragas	25	(0)
2016–	Lucchese	47	(0)

International career
2002	Italy U20	1	(0)
- * Club domestic league appearances and goals as of 3 November 2017

Ciro Capuano (born 10 August 1981) is an Italian former footballer who last played for Serie C club Lucchese as a left back.

== Club career ==
=== Empoli ===
Capuano started his professional career with Empoli when he was promoted from their youth squad in 1999. In his first and only first-team season with the club, he would not make a single appearance. In 2000, Capuano moved north to play his football with Pisa.

=== Pisa ===
In his first full season with the western Italian club, which, at the time, was playing in Serie C1, Capuano instantly broke into the club's first team and managed an impressive 28 appearances, also scoring 2 goals. His second season with the club was again a successful one, as the left back, managed an additional 30 league appearances and scored a career high 4 goals, during the 2002–03 Serie C1 season. He was linked with a host of Serie B clubs, following the season, but decided to remain with Pisa for the 2003–04 season. His 2003–04 season was hampered by injury, however, and the player made just 19 league appearances. From 2000 to 2004, Capuano managed 7 goals in an impressive 99 league appearances, before he was purchased by Serie A side Bologna, following his impressive spell in Pisa.

=== Bologna ===
In his first season with Bologna, Capuano managed to make his Serie A debut, and made 18 league appearances, also appearing for the club in the Coppa Italia. At the conclusion of his first season, the club was relegated, following a play-out loss to Parma. Despite the club's relegation, Capuano remained with the Emilia-Romagna based club, hence, spent the next season with them in Serie B. During the 2005–2006 Serie B season, Bologna wound up finishing in 8th position, and Capuano made nearly 40 appearances for the club, in all competitions. His performances for the club managed to find him as a sought-after defender by many Serie A clubs, including newly promoted Catania, as well as Sicilian rivals Palermo, and Chievo Verona. In 2006, he was snapped up by.

=== Palermo ===
Capuano officially transferred to the Sicilian capital during the 2006 summer transfer window. In his first season with the club, Capuano made just 7 appearances and scored a single Serie A goal. He was behind Italian international Fabio Grosso, at the left wing-back position. Following the sale of Fabio Grosso, Capuano had hope to be the club's starting left back, and made 12 appearances during the first portion of the 2007–2008 Serie A campaign, before the January purchase of former Juventus star, Federico Balzaretti. Capuano again dropped to the bench for the remainder of the season. His third season started off in the same fashion, and the player eventually transferred to Sicilian rivals, Catania, on loan for the second portion of the 2008–09 campaign.

=== Catania ===
Capuano started his new adventure on a high, as he instantly surpassed Rocco Sabato, for the left back starting spot. He maintained his status for the entirety of his loan and managed 18 league appearances, out of a possible 18 games. He also managed 1 goal. Catania also notably defeated its former club, Palermo, 4–0, at the Stadio Renzo Barbera in the Sicilian derby in May 2009. During the 2009 summer transfer window, Catania chief, Pietro Lo Monaco, made the deal permanent and Capuano remained at the eastern Sicilian club, after displaying impressive form during his loan period. In two and a half seasons with Palermo, Capuano made just 19 appearances for the club, scoring one goal, ironically, the same total appearances he made in just half a season with Catania, if his solo Coppa Italia appearance is noted.

Following his permanent transfer to Catania, Capuano maintained his starting place for the 2009–10 Serie A season, making 30 appearances, helping his side to a record points total for the club, in Serie A, which led to a 13th-placed finish in the table, as well as a quarter-final position in the Coppa Italia. Capuano held his starting left back position for the 2010–11 season, despite injury, and scored one of the goals of the season in a 1–1 draw with Milan in October 2010. Capuano was part of a record-breaking Catania outfit that had picked up 56 points from 38 Serie A matches. This performance sees the club also break its record number of home victories in a single season, its record number of victories overall in a single top-flight campaign, as well as its record points total in Serie A for the fifth consecutive season. In his five seasons with Catania, the club has achieved these five consecutive record points totals.
