= Marco Biagianti =

Italian footballer

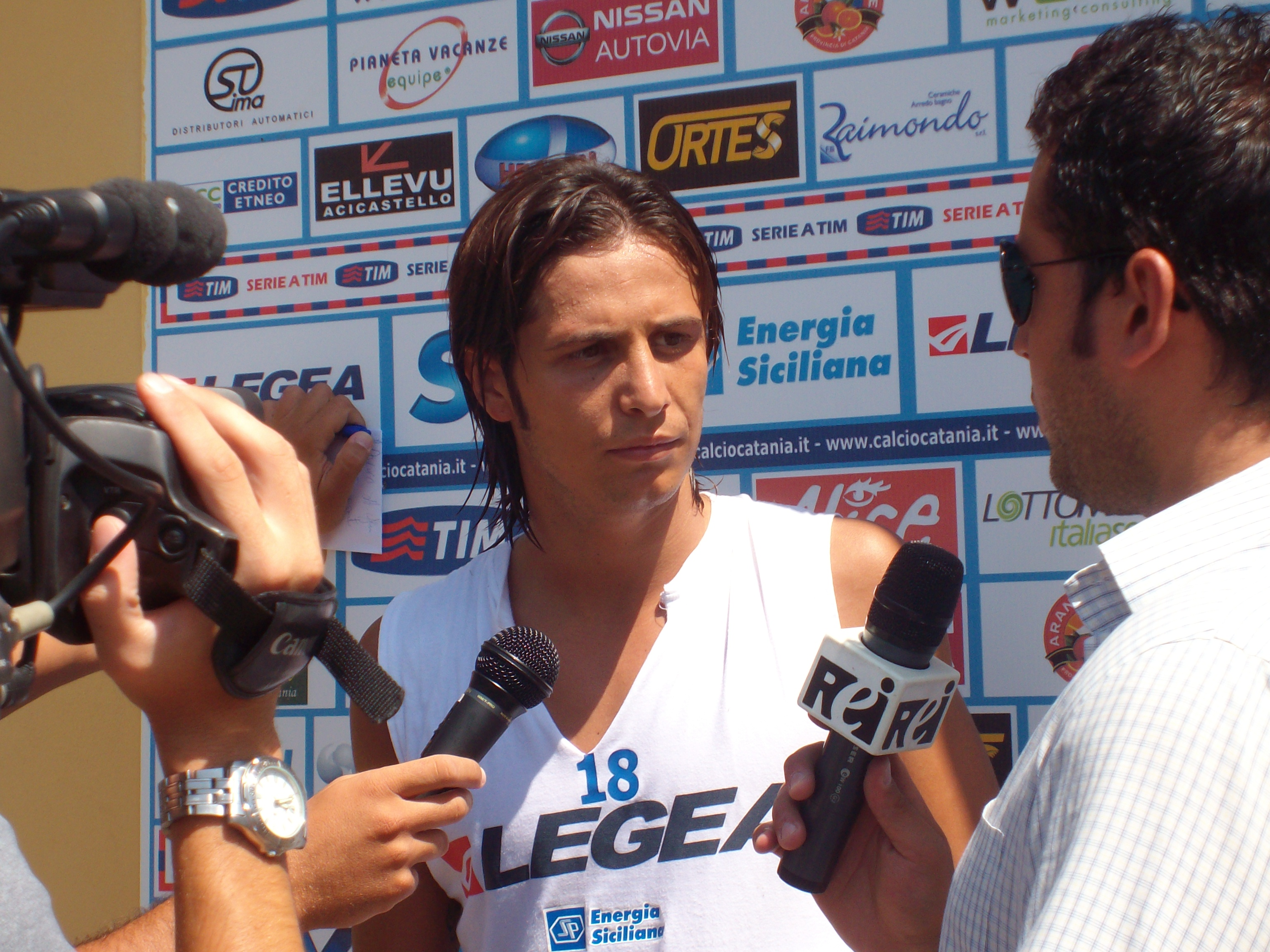
- Marco Biagianti at the Massannunziata Sports Centre

Personal information
- Full name: Marco Biagianti
- Date of birth: 19 April 1984 (age 42)
- Place of birth: Florence, Italy
- Height: 1.80 m (5 ft 11 in)
- Position: Midfielder

Youth career
- 2002–2003: Fiorentina

Senior career*
Years	Team	Apps	(Gls)
2003–2004	→ Fano (loan)	30	(0)
2004–2005	→ Chieti (loan)	27	(1)
2005–2006	Pro Vasto	44	(1)
2006–2013	Catania	148	(3)
2013–2016	Livorno	80	(2)
2016–2020	Catania	107	(8)
- * Club domestic league appearances and goals as of 8 March 2020

Marco Biagianti (born 19 April 1984) is an Italian former footballer who played as a midfielder.

== Club career ==
=== A.C.F. Fiorentina ===
Biagianti began his career with former Serie A giants ACF Fiorentina, in 2002, during the club's financial troubles that led to their relegation to the Serie C2. After spending his early career with the club's youth system, the central midfielder was promoted to the first team for the 2003–2004 season, but was instantly loaned out to Serie C2 side Fano Calcio. During his first full season as a professional footballer, Biagianti managed 30 first team appearances, and returned to Florence for the start of the 2004–2005 season. However, Fiorentina again opted to loan the youngster out, and he joined A.S.D. Chieti, who were playing in the Serie C1 at the time. In his lone season with Chieti, Biagianti made 26 league appearances and scored a single goal. It was his first professional goal. Following his return to Tuscany, after the second loan deal expired, Biagianti was surprisingly sold to another third division club, in the form of F.C. Pro Vasto.

=== Pro Vasto ===
In August 2005, Biagianti officially transferred to F.C. Pro Vasto of the Italian Serie C1. He made a total of 31 league starts, and scored 1 league goal, but it was not enough to save his club from relegation to the Serie C2. He started the new season as a regular starter and racked up 15 appearances in all competitions, before transferring to Serie A club, Calcio Catania in January 2006.

=== Calcio Catania ===
Biagianti was scouted by Catania chief, Pierto Lo Monaco in 2005, and negotiations began in December 2005, and led to his January transfer to the Sicilian club in 2006. In his first half-season with Catania, Biagianti made just 2 league appearances, but in his second season, became a more integral part of the team. He appeared in over 20 matches in all competitions, during the 2007–2008 season, and earned a guaranteed starting place for the 2008–09 season, under then-coach Walter Zenga. Biagianti made 34 Serie A appearances alone, and helped Catania to safely avoid relegation concerns. Biagianti maintained his status as a starter during the 2009–10 Serie A campaign and went on to make 36 league appearances, appearing more than any other player in the first team. He also managed to score 3 league goals, helping lead Catania to a 12th place league finish, a record high points total for the club in Serie A and to a quarter final position in the Coppa Italia.

Since joining Calcio Catania he has been one of their most influential players. Because of his superb performances, Biagianti has been linked with moves to Serie A giants A.C. Milan, Juventus, Fiorentina, and A.S. Roma, but despite these rumours Biagianti has reiterated his desire to remain in Sicily. Biagianti, unfortunately missed much of the Serie A 2010-11 campaign due to injury, and made just 13 appearances, his fewest in a season with the Sicilians since his first at the club. The club did however reach a record points total in a Serie A season for a third consecutive season.

On 9 July 2011, Biagianti was assigned captaincy at the club. However, the midfielder missed much of the 2011–12 Serie A season through injury, although his club continued their league surge, by breaking the club's record points total in the top flight for a fourth consecutive season, finishing 11th. He is currently part of a record-breaking Catania outfit that had picked up 56 points from 38 Serie A matches. This performance saw the club also break its record number of home victories in a single season, its record number of victories overall in a single top flight campaign, as well as its record points total in Serie A for the fifth consecutive season.

In the summer of 2013, he moved to Livorno, where he remained until 2016. From 2016 to 2020 he returned to Catania. During the 2020–21 season, after being taken out of the squad, he announced his retirement from professional football in a press conference, and began a new adventure with the 5-a-side football club Catania Goal. During the 2021–22 season, he held the position of club manager of the Catania Goal. In August 2022 he became the team manager of Catania SSD.

== International career ==
On 29 May 2009, Biagianti received his first call up to the Italy national football team as he was named in the squad for the friendly against Northern Ireland that took place on 6 June 2009. Also named in the squad was teammate Giuseppe Mascara. Biagianti remained on the bench for that game, however. Biagianti was linked with a possible place in Marcello Lippi's squad for the 2010 FIFA World Cup, but eventually failed to make the 23-man roster chosen by Lippi.
