= AC Bellaria Igea Marina =

Italian football club

Bellaria Igea
- Full name: Associazione Calcio Bellaria Igea Marina SRL
- Founded: 1912
- Ground: Stadio Enrico Nanni, Bellaria – Igea Marina, Italy
- Capacity: 2,500
- Chairman: Luigino Lucci
- League: Serie E
- 2013–14: Lega Pro Seconda Divisione/A, 17th (relegated)
Home colours	Away colours

Associazione Calcio Bellaria Igea Marina is an Italian association football club based in Bellaria – Igea Marina, Emilia-Romagna. The club competes in Serie D.

== History ==
The club was founded in 1912 and refounded in 1994.

== Colours and badge ==
The team's colours are light blue and white.
