= SS Milazzo SSD =

Italian football club

Milazzo
- Full name: Società Sportiva Milazzo; Società Sportiva Dilettantistica a r.l.
- Founded: 16 December 1930; 95 years ago 1984 (refounded); 2006 (refounded); 2014 (refounded); 2018 (refounded)
- Ground: Stadio Marco Salmeri
- Capacity: 2,500
- Manager: Mauro Versaci
- Coach: Gaetano Catalano
- League: Serie D
- 2025–26: Serie D/I, 8th
Home colours	Away colours

Società Sportiva Milazzo Società Sportiva Dilettantistica, commonly known as Milazzo (pronounced [miˈlattso]), is an Italian football club based in Milazzo, Sicily, who compete in Serie D, the fourth tier of the Italian football league system.

== History ==
The club was founded on 16 December 1830 by Giovanni Impallomeni, as announced in a press release in "Gazzetta di Messina e delle Calabrie". The club has been refounded multiple times throughout its history.

=== From Promozione to Lega Pro Seconda Divisione ===
After a long period in the lower divisions of Italian football, Milazzo, thanks to three consecutive promotions, has succeeded in joining the professional football by taking part in Lega Pro Seconda Divisione in the 2009–10 season after an ascent started in Promozione Sicily in the 2007–08 season.

Its first season in the Lega Pro Seconda Divisione in 2010–2011 was successful, thanks to an excellent performance in the second round, which led the team to finish 3rd in the standings. Milazzo played in the playoffs against Avellino, but lost both matches, and thus remained in the Lega Pro Seconda Divisione for the next season.

In the second season in Lega Pro Seconda Divisione, Milazzo was facing relegation many times, but in the end was saved. In 2013, it was excluded from all competitions, but in 2014, it was admitted to Eccellenza Sicily.

== Colors and badge ==
The team's colours are red and blue.
