= 2011–12 Calcio Catania season =

Catania
2011–12 season
- President: Antonino Pulvirenti
- Head Coach: Vincenzo Montella
- Stadium: Stadio Angelo Massimino
- Serie A: 11th
- Coppa Italia: Section 4 Fourth Round
- Top goalscorer: League: Lodi (9); All: Lodi (9)
- Highest home attendance: 20,253 vs Milan (Serie A, 31 March 2012)
- Lowest home attendance: 3,457 vs Novara (Coppa Italia, 29 November 2011)
- Average home league attendance: 14,435
Home colours	Away colours	Third colours

The 2011–12 season is Catania's 104th in existence and sixth consecutive season in the top flight of Italian football, Serie A. Catania starts the season with a new manager, Vincenzo Montella.

== Coach ==
Vincenzo Montella was officially appointed as the new manager of Catania on 1 July 2011, taking over the post previously left vacant following the departure of Diego Simeone. A former striker and former caretaker of Roma, Montella was given the task to coach Catania. The Naples-born tactician is currently the youngest head coach of Serie A. His most recent coaching experience was acting as caretaker for Roma towards the end of the 2010–11 season.

== First team ==
Players and squad numbers last updated on 23 March 2012. Note: Flags indicate national team as has been defined under FIFA eligibility rules. Players may hold more than one non-FIFA nationality.

No.	Name	Nationality	Position	Date of birth (age)	Signed from	Notes
Goalkeepers
1	Tomáš Košický	(Slovakia)	GK	11 March 1989 (age 37)	(Slovakia) Inter Bratislava	
20	Juan Pablo Carrizo	(Argentina)	GK	6 May 1984 (age 42)	Lazio	on loan from Lazio
29	Pietro Terracciano	(Italy)	GK	8 March 1990 (age 36)	Nocerina	
30	Andrea Campagnolo	(Italy)	GK	17 June 1978 (age 48)	Reggina	
Defenders
2	Alessandro Potenza	(Italy)	DF	8 March 1984 (age 42)	Genoa	
3	Nicolás Spolli	(Argentina)	DF	20 February 1983 (age 43)	(Argentina) Newell's Old Boys	
6	Nicola Legrottaglie	(Italy)	DF	20 October 1976 (age 50)	Milan	
11	Marco Motta	(Italy)	DF	14 May 1986 (age 40)	Juventus	on loan from Juventus
12	Giovanni Marchese	(Italy)	DF	17 October 1984 (age 42)	Chievo	
14	Giuseppe Bellusci	(Italy)	DF	21 August 1989 (age 37)	Ascoli	
15	Wellington Teixeira	(Brazil)	DF	21 June 1988 (age 38)	(Brazil) Uberaba	
33	Ciro Capuano	(Italy)	DF	10 August 1981 (age 45)	Palermo	Vice-captain
Midfielders
4	Sergio Almirón	(Argentina)	MF	7 November 1980 (age 46)	Bari	
5	Mario Paglialunga	(Argentina)	MF	29 October 1988 (age 38)	(Argentina) Rosario Central	
8	Felipe Seymour	(Chile)	MF	23 July 1987 (age 39)	Genoa	on loan from Genoa
10	Francesco Lodi	(Italy)	MF	24 March 1984 (age 42)	Frosinone	
13	Mariano Izco	(Argentina)	MF	13 March 1983 (age 43)	(Mexico) Tigre	Vice-captain
16	Cristian Llama	(Argentina)	MF	26 June 1986 (age 40)	(Argentina) Arsenal de Sarandí	
19	Adrián Ricchiuti	(Argentina)	MF	30 June 1978 (age 48)	Rimini	
27	Marco Biagianti	(Italy)	MF	14 April 1984 (age 42)	Pro Vasto	Captain
28	Pablo Barrientos	(Argentina)	MF	17 January 1985 (age 41)	(Russia) FC Moscow	
Forwards
7	Davide Lanzafame	(Italy)	SS	9 February 1987 (age 39)	Palermo	
9	David Suazo	(Honduras)	ST	5 November 1979 (age 47)	Inter	
17	Alejandro Gómez	(Argentina)	SS	15 February 1988 (age 38)	(Argentina) Arsenal de Sarandí	
23	Gonzalo Bergessio	(Argentina)	ST	20 July 1984 (age 42)	(France) Saint-Étienne	
22	Osarimen Ebagua	(Italy)	ST	6 June 1986 (age 40)	Torino	on loan from Torino
32	Andrea Catellani	(Italy)	ST	26 May 1988 (age 38)	Youth programme	
Players transferred during the season

== Transfers ==
=== In ===
Catania began this season's transfer activity by signing Federico Moretti from Ascoli on 20 June 2011. Other signings include Pietro Terracciano from Nocerina, Keko from Atlético Madrid, David Suazo from Inter, and Gonzalo Bergessio from Saint-Étienne. On 4 August, Mario Paglialunga transferred from Rosario Central as well as Davide Lanzafame from Palermo on 7 August. Nicola Legrottaglie transferred from Milan on a free transfer. Other transfers include Sergio Almirón from Juventus. During the winter transfer window, Catania loaned Marco Motta from Juventus, Juan Pablo Carrizo from Lazio, Osarimen Ebagua from Torino, and Felipe Seymour from Genoa.

No.	Pos.	Player	Age	Moving From	Type of Transfer	Transfer window	Transfer fee	Source
--	MF	(Italy) Federico Moretti	22	(Italy) Ascoli	Full ownership	Summer	Undisclosed	
29	GK	(Italy) Pietro Terracciano	21	(Italy) Nocerina	Full ownership	Summer	Free	
15	FW	(Spain) Keko	19	(Spain) Atlético Madrid	Full ownership	Summer	Free	
9	FW	(Honduras) David Suazo	31	(Italy) Inter	Full ownership	Summer	Free	
18	FW	(Argentina) Gonzalo Bergessio	27	(France) Saint-Étienne	Full ownership	Summer	€3,000,000	
5	MF	(Argentina) Mario Paglialunga	22	(Argentina) Rosario Central	Full ownership	Summer	Undisclosed	
7	FW	(Italy) Davide Lanzafame	24	(Italy) Palermo	Full ownership	Summer	Undisclosed	
6	DF	(Italy) Nicola Legrottaglie	34	(Italy) Milan	Full ownership	Summer	Free	
4	MF	(Argentina) Sergio Almirón	30	(Italy) Juventus	Full ownership	Summer	Undisclosed	
11	DF	(Italy) Marco Motta	25	(Italy) Juventus	Loan	Winter	Free	
20	GK	(Argentina) Juan Pablo Carrizo	27	(Italy) Lazio	Loan	Winter	Free	
22	FW	(Niger) Osarimen Ebagua	25	(Italy) Torino	Loan	Winter	Free	
8	MF	(Chile) Felipe Seymour	24	(Italy) Genoa	Loan	Winter	Free	

=== Out ===
Catania loaned out Mirco Antenucci to Torino on 24 June 2011. Catania sold Simone Pesce to Novara while Gianvito Plasmati moved to Nocerina. Other departures include Cristian Suarino loaned to Nocerina, Ezequiel Carboni to Banfield, Takayuki Morimoto sold to Novara in a co-ownership bid. On 2 August 2011 Christian Terlizzi left on a free transfer to Varese as well as Raphael Martinho loaned to Cesena on 5 August. Matías Silvestre was sold to Palermo and Andrea D'Amico was loaned to Portogruaro. Other transfers include Nicola Lanzolla to Pisa, Błażej Augustyn loaned to Vicenza, and Federico Moretti loaned to Grosseto. During the winter transfer window, Catania loaned out Fabio Scaccia and Keko to Grosseto. Catania also loaned Pablo Ledesma to Boca Juniors, loaned Mariano Andújar to Estudiantes, loaned Maxi López to Milan, and loaned Pablo Sebastián Álvarez to Real Zaragoza. The winter transfer window also saw Gennaro Delvecchio sold to Lecce and Vincent Kouadio sold to Qormi.

No.	Pos.	Player	Age	Moving to	Type of Transfer	Transfer window	Transfer fee	Source
–	FW	(Italy) Mirco Antenucci	26	(Italy) Torino	Loan	Summer	Free	
–	MF	(Italy) Simone Pesce	29	(Italy) Novara	Full ownership	Summer	Undisclosed	
–	FW	(Italy) Gianvito Plasmati	28	(Italy) Nocerina	Full-ownership	Summer	Free	
–	MF	(Italy) Cristian Suarino	21	(Italy) Nocerina	Loan	Summer	Free	
–	MF	(Argentina) Ezequiel Carboni	32	(Argentina) Banfield	Full ownership	Summer	Free	
–	FW	(Japan) Takayuki Morimoto	23	(Italy) Novara	Co-ownership	Summer	Undisclosed	
88	DF	(Italy) Christian Terlizzi	31	(Italy) Varese	Full ownership	Summer	Free	
15	MF	(Brazil) Raphael Martinho	23	(Italy) Cesena	Loan	Summer	Free	
3	DF	(Argentina) Matías Silvestre	26	(Italy) Palermo	Full ownsership	Summer	€7,000,000	
–	MF	(Italy) Andrea D'Amico	22	(Italy) Portogruaro	Loan	Summer	Free	
–	DF	(Italy) Nicola Lanzolla	22	(Italy) Pisa	Full ownership	Summer	Undisclosed	
–	DF	(Poland) Błażej Augustyn	23	(Italy) Vicenza	Loan	Summer	Free	
–	MF	(Italy) Federico Moretti	22	(Italy) Grosseto	Loan	Summer	Free	
37	MF	(Italy) Fabio Sciacca	22	(Italy) Grosseto	Loan	Winter	Free	
9	FW	(Spain) Keko	20	(Italy) Grosseto	Loan	Winter	Free	
–	MF	(Argentina) Pablo Ledesma	27	(Argentina) Boca Juniors	Loan	Winter	Free	
21	GK	(Argentina) Mariano Andújar	28	(Argentina) Estudiantes	Loan	Winter	Free	
21	FW	(Argentina) Maxi López	27	(Italy) Milan	Loan	Winter	Free	
2	DF	(Argentina) Pablo Sebastián Álvarez	27	(Spain) Real Zaragoza	Loan	Winter	Free	
82	MF	(Italy) Gennaro Delvecchio	33	(Italy) Lecce	Full ownership	Winter	Undisclosed	
99	MF	(Ivory Coast) Vincent Kouadio	21	(Malta) Qormi	Full ownership	Winter	Undisclosed	

== Club ==
=== Coaching staff ===
Position	Staff
Head coach	(Italy) Vincenzo Montella
Assistant coach	(Italy) Daniele Russo
Goalkeepers' coach	(Italy) Marco Onorati
Field assistant	(Italy) Giuseppe Irrera
Field cooperator	(Italy) Salvatore Monaco

Last updated: March 2012
Source: Management staff

== Pre-season and friendlies ==
22 July 2011 Friendly	(Cyprus) Omonia	1–2	(Italy) Catania	Nicosia
19:05 CEST (UTC+02)	Aguiar 72'	Report	Ledesma 51'; Augustyn 90+1'	Stadium: GSP Stadium

31 July 2011 Friendly	(Spain) Athletic Bilbao	3–1	(Italy) Catania	Bilbao
21:00 CEST (UTC+02)	Martínez 43'; Susaeta 59'; Herrera 78'	Report	Keko 62'	Stadium: San Mamés Stadium

10 August 2011 Friendly	(Italy) Milazzo	3–5	(Italy) Catania	Milazzo
11:45 CEST (UTC+02)		Report		Stadium: Stadio Grotta Polifemo

13 August 2011 Friendly	(Italy) Catania	1–2	(Spain) Real Sociedad	Catania
20:45 CEST (UTC+02)	Potenza 36'	Report	30' (o.g.) Spolli; 80' Sarpong	Stadium: Stadio Angelo Massimino; Referee: Daniele Doveri

== Competitions ==
=== Serie A ===
==== League table ====
Pos	Team	Pld	W	D	L	GF	GA	GD	Pts
9	Bologna	38	13	12	13	41	43	−2	51
10	Chievo	38	12	13	13	35	45	−10	49
11	Catania	38	11	15	12	47	52	−5	48
12	Atalanta (Note: Atalanta were deducted 6 points due to involvement in the 2011–12 Italian football scandal.)	38	13	13	12	41	43	−2	46 (Note: Atalanta finished ahead of Fiorentina on head–to–head away goals scored: Atalanta 2–0 Fiorentina, Fiorentina 2–2 Atalanta.)
13	Fiorentina	38	11	13	14	37	43	−6	46

Source: Lega Serie A
Rules for classification: 1) points; 2) head-to-head points; 3) head-to-head goal difference; 4) head-to-head goals scored; 5) goal difference; 6) number of goals scored

==== Results by round ====
Round	1	2	3	4	5	6	7	8	9	10	11	12	13	14	15	16	17	18	19	20	21	22	23	24	25	26	27	28	29	30	31	32	33	34	35	36	37	38
Ground	H	H	A	H	A	H	A	A	H	A	H	A	H	A	H	A	A	A	H	H	H	A	A	H	A	A	H	H	A	H	A	H	A	H	A	H	A	H
Result	D	W	L	D	D	W	D	D	W	L	L	W	L	D	W	D	L	L	D	D	W	L	W	W	D	D	W	W	D	D	L	L	L	W	D	L	D	L

Updated to match(es) played on 14 May 2012. Source: Competitive Matches
A = Away; H = Home; W = Win; D = Draw; L = Loss

==== Matches ====
The fixtures for the 2011–12 Serie A season were announced by the Lega Serie A on 27 July.

11 September 2011 1	Catania	0–0	Siena	Catania
21:00 CEST (UTC+02)	Lanzafame (yellow card) 11'; Biagianti (yellow card) 62'	Report	González (yellow card) 37'; Rossettini (yellow card) 65'; Terzi (yellow card) 77'; Calaiò (yellow card) 90'	Stadium: Stadio Angelo Massimino; Attendance: 13,223; Referee: Luca Banti

18 September 2011 2	Catania	1–0	Cesena	Catania
18:00 CEST (UTC+02)	Potenza (yellow card) 18'; López 45+1'; Álvarez (yellow card) 75'; Biagianti (yellow card) 90+3'	Report	Candreva (yellow card) 74'; Lauro (yellow card) 75'	Stadium: Stadio Angelo Massimino; Attendance: 12,270; Referee: Andrea Gervasoni

21 September 2011 3	Genoa	3–0	Catania	Genoa
11:45 CEST (UTC+02)	Palacio 29', 34'; Bovo (yellow card) 66'; Constant 79'; Dainelli (yellow card) 85'	Report	Ledesma (yellow card) 62'	Stadium: Stadio Luigi Ferraris; Attendance: 21,649; Referee: Riccardo Tozzi

25 September 2011 4	Catania	1–1	Juventus	Catania
18:00 CEST (UTC+02)	Bergessio 22'; Almirón (yellow card) 52'; Capuano (yellow card) 61'	Report	Marchisio (yellow card) 16'; Chiellini (yellow card) 25'; Krasić 49'; Vidal (yellow card) 74'	Stadium: Stadio Angelo Massimino; Attendance: 20,000; Referee: Paolo Mazzoleni

2 October 2011 5	Novara	3–3	Catania	Novara
15:00 CEST (UTC+02)	Dellafiore (yellow card) 30'; Meggiorini (yellow card) 45'; Rigoni 49' (pen.); Porcari (yellow card) 55'; Morimoto 66'; Paci (yellow card) 84'; Jeda 85'; Morimoto (yellow card) 89'	Report	Legrottaglie 14'; Lodi 56'; Lanzafame (yellow card) 58'; Gómez 90+1'	Stadium: Stadio Silvio Piola (Novara); Attendance: 10,632; Referee: Christian Brighi

15 October 2011 6	Catania	2–1	Inter	Catania
21:00 CEST (UTC+02)	Spolli (yellow card) 43'; Almirón 47'; Lodi 50' (pen.); Bellusci (yellow card) 90'	Report	Cambiasso 6'; Castellazzi (yellow card) 50'; Zárate (yellow card) 71'	Stadium: Stadio Angelo Massimino; Attendance: 13,000; Referee: Daniele Orsato

22 October 2011 7	Fiorentina	2–2	Catania	Florence
21:00 CEST (UTC+02)	Jovetić 20', 62'; Montolivo (yellow card) 30'	Report	Delvecchio 43'; Spolli (yellow card) 60'; López 82'	Stadium: Stadio Artemio Franchi; Attendance: 18,783; Referee: Antonio Giannoccaro

26 October 2011 8	Lazio	1–1	Catania	Rome
11:45 CEST (UTC+02)	Klose 17'; Lulić (yellow card) 20'	Report	Marchese (yellow card) 28'; Spolli (yellow card) 59'; Bergessio 63', (yellow card) 90+1'; Lanzafame (yellow card) 86'; Lodi (yellow card) 89'	Stadium: Stadio Olimpico; Attendance: 30,000; Referee: Gabriele Gava

29 October 2011 9	Catania	2–1	Napoli	Catania
21:00 CEST (UTC+02)	Marchese 25'; Bergessio 48'; Bellusci (yellow card) 66'	Report	Cavani 1'; Santana (yellow card) 19' (yellow-red card) 43'; Cannavaro (yellow card) 61'	Stadium: Stadio Angelo Massimino; Attendance: 10,000; Referee: Domenico Celi

6 November 2011 10	Milan	4–0	Catania	Milan
18:00 CEST (UTC+02)	Ibrahimović 7' (pen.), (yellow card) 90+1'; Ambrosini (yellow card) 9'; Robinho 24'; Bonera (yellow card) 45'; Lodi 69' (o.g.); Abate (yellow card) 71'; Zambrotta 72'	Report	Lanzafame (yellow card) 7'; Legrottaglie (yellow card) 39'; Barrientos (yellow card) 71'	Stadium: San Siro; Attendance: 44,100; Referee: Andrea Gervasoni

20 November 2011 11	Catania	1–2	Chievo	Catania
18:00 CEST (UTC+02)	Spolli (yellow card) 45'; Almirón 78', (yellow card) 90+1'	Report	Luciano (yellow card) 1'; Pellissier 45' (pen.), (yellow card) 86'; Mandelli (yellow card) 68'; Sammarco 73'	Stadium: Stadio Angelo Massimino; Attendance: 14,000; Referee: Paolo Tagliavento

26 November 2011 12	Lecce	0–1	Catania	Lecce
21:00 CEST (UTC+02)	Cuadrado (yellow card) 38'; Brivio (yellow card) 60'; Strasser (yellow card) 67'; Esposito (yellow card) 88'	Report	Marchese (yellow card) 33'; Barrientos 90'; Andújar (yellow card) 90+4'	Stadium: Stadio Via del Mare; Attendance: 6,000; Referee: Sebastiano Peruzzo

4 December 2011 13	Catania	0–1	Cagliari	Catania
15:30 CEST (UTC+02)	Barrientos (yellow card) 75'; Lodi (yellow card) 86'	Report	Ibarbo 64'; Biondini (yellow card) 83'	Stadium: Stadio Angelo Massimino; Attendance: 14,000; Referee: Mauro Bergonzi

11 December 2011 14	Atalanta	1–1	Catania	Bergamo
18:00 CEST (UTC+02)	Carmona (yellow card) 42'; Bellini (yellow card) 56'; Tiribocchi (yellow card) 58', (goal) 71'	Report	Spolli (yellow card) 12' (yellow-red card) 44'; Legrottaglie 18'; Marchese (yellow card) 34'; Delvecchio (yellow card) 35'	Stadium: Stadio Atleti Azzurri d'Italia; Attendance: 13,716; Referee: Antonio Giannoccaro

18 December 2011 15	Catania	2–0	Palermo	Catania
18:00 CEST (UTC+02)	Lodi 32'; Almirón (yellow card) 49'; López 61' (pen.); Delvecchio (yellow card) 73'; Bellusci (yellow card) 84'	Report	Della Rocca (yellow card) 31'; Pinilla (yellow card) 60'; Barreto (yellow card) 67'; Bertolo (yellow card) 68'; Silvestre (yellow card) 73'	Stadium: Stadio Angelo Massimino; Attendance: 14,000; Referee: Antonio Damato

21 December 2011 16	Parma	3–3	Catania	Parma
11:45 CEST (UTC+02)	Modesto 5'; Biabiany 23'; Lucarelli (yellow card) 34'; Floccari 44'	Report	Legrottaglie (yellow card) 20'; Almirón 22'; Lodi 74' (pen.); Izco (yellow card) 80'; Catellani 85', (yellow card) 86'	Stadium: Stadio Ennio Tardini; Attendance: 15,000; Referee: Davide Massa

8 January 2012 17	Bologna	2–0	Catania	Bologna
18:00 CEST (UTC+02)	Di Vaio (yellow card) 26', (goal) 90'; Mudingayi (yellow card) 48'; Cherubin 50'; Cherubin (yellow card) 77'	Report	Legrottaglie (yellow card) 28'; Marchese (yellow card) 33'; Álvarez (yellow card) 72'; Izco (yellow card) 45+2'; Biagianti (yellow card) 55' (yellow-red card) 78'	Stadium: Stadio Renato Dall'Ara; Attendance: 14,572; Referee: Andrea Romeo

22 January 2012 18	Udinese	2–1	Catania	Udine
18:00 CEST (UTC+02)	Armero 20'; Di Natale 53'; Fernandes (yellow card) 64'; Basta (yellow card) 85'	Report	Legrottaglie (yellow card) 34'; Almirón (yellow card) 90'; Lodi 90+4' (pen.)	Stadium: Stadio Friuli; Attendance: 13,000; Referee: Emilio Ostinelli

28 January 2012 19	Catania	1–1	Parma	Catania
21:00 CEST (UTC+02)	Bergessio 34'; Potenza (yellow card) 90'	Report	Modesto 44'; Morrone (yellow card) 68'	Stadium: Stadio Angelo Massimino; Attendance: 11,000; Referee: Daniele Doveri

8 February 2012 20	Catania	1–1	Roma	Catania
21:00 CEST (UTC+02)	Spolli (yellow card) 19'; Legrottaglie 24'; Potenza (yellow card) 36'; Bergessio (yellow card) 50'; Bellusci (yellow card) 69'; Lodi (yellow card) 83'	Report	Simplício (yellow card) 7'; De Rossi 29', (yellow card) 29'; Pjanić (yellow card) 80'; Taddei (yellow card) 90'	Stadium: Stadio Angelo Massimino; Attendance: 14,000; Referee: Paolo Tagliavento

12 February 2012 21	Catania	4–0	Genoa	Catania
18:00 CEST (UTC+02)	Lodi 8' (pen.); Barrientos 49', 52'; Bergessio 62'	Report	Birsa (yellow card) 7'; Biondini (yellow card) 20'; Janković (yellow card) 45+1'; Kaladze (yellow card) 51'; Mesto (yellow card) 64'	Stadium: Stadio Angelo Massimino; Attendance: 12,600; Referee: Piero Giacomelli

18 February 2012 22	Juventus	3–1	Catania	Turin
11:45 CEST (UTC+02)	Pirlo 22'; Marchisio (yellow card) 57'; Chiellini 74'; Vučinić (yellow card) 78'; Quagliarella 81'	Report	Barrientos 4'; Motta (yellow card) 51' (yellow-red card) 65'; Almirón (yellow card) 67'; Legrottaglie (yellow card) 90+2'	Stadium: Juventus Stadium; Attendance: 31,000; Referee: Christian Brighi

22 February 2012 23	Siena	0–1	Catania	Siena
21:30 CEST (UTC+02)	Calaiò (yellow card) 35'; Gazzi (yellow card) 48'	Report	Lodi 23' (pen.); Legrottaglie (yellow card) 63'; Carrizo (yellow card) 79'	Stadium: Stadio Artemio Franchi; Attendance: 10,000; Referee: Carmine Russo

26 February 2012 24	Catania	3–1	Novara	Catania
18:00 CEST (UTC+02)	Bergessio 30'; Marchese 47'; Gómez 54'	Report	Rigoni (yellow card) 81'; Rubino 84'; Centurioni (yellow card) 87'	Stadium: Stadio Angelo Massimino; Attendance: 13,250; Referee: Giampaolo Calvarese

4 March 2012 25	Inter	2–2	Catania	Milan
11:45 CEST (UTC+02)	Forlán 71'; Sneijder (yellow card) 75'; Milito 79'	Report	Gómez 19'; Izco (yellow card) 35', (goal) 38'	Stadium: San Siro; Attendance: 47,000; Referee: Domenico Celi

7 March 2012 26	Cesena	0–0	Catania	Cesena
21:30 CEST (UTC+02)	Pudil (yellow card) 21' (yellow-red card) 21'; Santana (yellow card) 30'; Parolo (yellow card) 32'; Arrigoni (yellow card) 50'; Comotto (yellow card) 90+2'	Report	Motta (yellow card) 88'; Almirón (red card) 90+4'	Stadium: Stadio Dino Manuzzi; Attendance: 17,000; Referee: Gianluca Rocchi

11 March 2012 27	Catania	1–0	Fiorentina	Catania
19:00 CEST (UTC+02)	Lodi 58' (pen.)	Report	Gamberini (yellow card) 57'; Amauri (yellow card) 88'	Stadium: Stadio Angelo Massimino; Attendance: 20,000; Referee: Daniele Doveri

18 March 2012 28	Catania	1–0	Lazio	Catania
19:00 CEST (UTC+02)	Spolli (yellow card) 27'; Gómez (yellow card) 64'; Legrottaglie 80'	Report	Klose (yellow card) 75'; Dias (yellow card) 78'; Mauri (yellow card) 90'	Stadium: Stadio Angelo Massimino; Attendance: 17,406; Referee: Andrea Romeo

25 March 2012 29	Napoli	2–2	Catania	Naples
18:00 CEST (UTC+02)	Džemaili 60', (yellow card) 73'; Cavani 67'	Report	Barrientos (yellow card) 59'; Spolli 75'; Lanzafame 85'; Ricchiuti (yellow card) 87'; Legrottaglie (yellow card) 89'	Stadium: Stadio San Paolo; Attendance: 44,000; Referee: Andrea Gervasoni

31 March 2012 30	Catania	1–1	Milan	Catania
21:00 CEST (UTC+02)	Spolli 57'	Report	Robinho 34'; Mexès (yellow card) 51'; Ambrosini (yellow card) 59'	Stadium: Stadio Angelo Massimino; Attendance: 20,253; Referee: Mauro Bergonzi

7 April 2012 31	Chievo	3–2	Catania	Verona
14:30 CEST (UTC+02)	Bradley 6'; Pellissier 20' (pen.); Paloschi 51'; Hetemaj (yellow card) 90+2'	Report	Spolli (red card) 19'; Andreolli 32' (o.g.); Marchese (yellow card) 43'; Almirón 85'	Stadium: Stadio Marc'Antonio Bentegodi; Attendance: 11,000; Referee: Davide Massa

11 April 2012 32	Catania	1–2	Lecce	Catania
11:45 CEST (UTC+02)	Bellusci (yellow card) 7'; Bergessio 52'; Marchese (yellow card) 79'; Seymour (yellow card) 86'; Carrizo (yellow card) 89' (yellow-red card) 89'	Report	Blasi (yellow card) 29'; Oddo (yellow card) 52'; Corvia 88'; Di Michele 90+1'	Stadium: Stadio Angelo Massimino; Attendance: 15,000; Referee: Andrea De Marco

22 April 2012 34	Catania	2–0	Atalanta	Catania
18:00 CEST (UTC+02)	Gómez 31'; Lanzafame (yellow card) 44'; Legrottaglie (yellow card) 51'; Seymour 85'; Bellusci (yellow card) 90+4'	Report	Carmona (yellow card) 86'; Peluso (yellow card) 90+1'	Stadium: Stadio Angelo Massimino; Attendance: 14,446; Referee: Andrea Romeo

25 April 2012 33	Cagliari	3–0	Catania	Cagliari
18:00 CEST (UTC+02)	Ribeiro 21'; Cossu (yellow card) 60'; Pinilla 79'; Ibarbo 90+4'	Report	Bellusci (yellow card) 65'	Stadium: Stadio Sant'Elia; Referee: Domenico Celi
Note: All the fixtures of 14–15 April weekend were postponed due to Piermario Morosini's death.

29 April 2012 35	Palermo	1–1	Catania	Palermo
18:00 CEST (UTC+02)	Miccoli 47', (yellow card) 48'; Iličić (yellow card) 52'	Report	Legrottaglie (yellow card) 12', (goal) 25'; Barrientos (yellow card) 61'; Spolli (yellow card) 90+3'	Stadium: Stadio Renzo Barbera; Attendance: 18,462; Referee: Gianluca Rocchi

2 May 2012 36	Catania	0–1	Bologna	Catania
11:45 CEST (UTC+02)	Spolli (yellow card) 77'	Report	Kone (yellow card) 12'; Ramírez (yellow card) 30', (goal) 79'; Portanova (yellow card) 36'	Stadium: Stadio Angelo Massimino; Attendance: 15,000; Referee: Gennaro Palazzino

6 May 2012 37	Roma	2–2	Catania	Rome
18:00 CEST (UTC+02)	De Rossi (yellow card) 45'; Totti 52', 77'; Heinze (yellow card) 57'; Pjanić (yellow card) 68'; Taddei (yellow card) 78'	Report	Barrientos (yellow card) 45+1'; Lodi 58' (pen.), (yellow card) 79'; Marchese 67'	Stadium: Stadio Olimpico; Attendance: 37,000; Referee: Sebastiano Peruzzo

13 May 2012 38	Catania	0–2	Udinese	Catania
11:45 CEST (UTC+02)		Report	Di Natale 19'; Domizzi (yellow card) 38'; Fabbrini 58'; Pinzi (yellow card) 61'; Pereyra (yellow card) 66'; Handanović (yellow card) 76'; Benatia (yellow card) 77'	Stadium: Stadio Angelo Massimino; Attendance: 15,000; Referee: Andrea De Marco

=== Coppa Italia ===
Catania started the Coppa Italia directly in the third round of section 4.

21 August 2011 Third round	Catania	2–1	Brescia	Catania
20:45 CEST (UTC+02)	López 38'; Gómez 90+1'	Report	Jonathas 55'	Stadium: Stadio Angelo Massimino; Attendance: 5,000; Referee: Sebastiano Peruzzo

29 November 2011 Fourth round	Catania	2–3	Novara	Catania
21:15 CEST (UTC+02)	Lanzafame 3'; López 70'; Bellusci (red card)	Report	Pesce (yellow card) 26'; Granoche 68'; Meggiorini (yellow card) 58', (goal) 78', 90'; García (yellow card) 85'	Stadium: Stadio Angelo Massimino; Attendance: 3,457; Referee: Leonardo Barcani
