= Andrea D'Amico =

Andrea D'Amico may refer to:

- Andrea D'Amico (football agent) (born 1964), Italian football agent
- Andrea D'Amico (footballer) (born 1989), Italian footballer

== See also ==
- D'Amico (disambiguation)
