= D'Amico =

D'Amico is an Italian surname. Those with the surname include:

== People ==
- Alicia D'Amico (1933–2001), Argentine photographer
- Andrea D'Amico (footballer) (born 1989), Italian midfielder
- Andrea D'Amico (football agent) (born 1964), Italian legal representative
- Antonio D'Amico (1959–2022), Italian model and fashion designer
- Carlos Alfredo D'Amico (1839–1917), Argentine lawyer, politician, and writer
- Fernando D'Amico (born 1975), Argentine retired footballer
- Hank D'Amico (1915–1965), American jazz clarinetist
- Ilaria D'Amico (born 1974), Italian commentator
- Jackie D'Amico (1936–2023), American mobster and head of the Gambino crime family
- Jeff D'Amico (born 1975), American professional baseball player
- John D'Amico (disambiguation), multiple people
- Joseph D'Amico (born 1955), former Bonanno crime family soldier and informant
- Marco D'Amico Canadian Guitarist, Singer and Songwriter
- Margarita D'Amico (1938–2017), Venezuelan journalist, researcher and professor
- Pasquale D'Amico, former Neapolitan Camorrista (mobster) who became a pentito (collaborator with the Italian authorities)
- Patricio D'Amico (born 1975), Argentine football manager
- Rudy D'Amico (born 1940), American National Basketball Association scout, and former college and professional basketball coach
- Suso Cecchi d'Amico, Italian screenwriter
- Tamela D'Amico, American singer, actress, and filmmaker

== Fictional characters ==
- Fat Tony (The Simpsons) (Anthony D'Amico), on The Simpsons animated series
- Connie D'Amico, a character in Family Guy
