= 2012–13 UC Sampdoria season =

Sampdoria
2012–13 season
- President: Riccardo Garrone (until 21 January 2013; deceased); Edoardo Garrone (from 28 February 2013)
- Manager: Ciro Ferrara (until 17 December 2012); Delio Rossi (from 17 December 2012)
- Stadium: Stadio Luigi Ferraris
- Serie A: 14th
- Coppa Italia: First round
- Top goalscorer: League: Mauro Icardi (10); All: Mauro Icardi (10)
- Highest home attendance: 30,350 vs. Genoa (18 November 2012, Serie A)
- Lowest home attendance: 20,897 vs. Udinese (10 December 2012, Serie A)
- Average home league attendance: 23,123
Home colours	Away colours	Third colours

The 2012–13 season was Sampdoria's 66th in existence. Sampdoria finished the 2011–12 season in sixth place in Serie B and were promoted to Serie A through the play-offs.

== Players ==
=== Squad information ===
As of 3 November 2012

Note: Flags indicate national team as defined under FIFA eligibility rules; some limited exceptions apply. Players may hold more than one non-FIFA nationality.

No.	Pos.	Nation	Player
1	GK	BRA	Júnior da Costa
2	MF	PAR	Marcelo Estigarribia (on loan from (Uruguay) Deportivo Maldonado)
3	DF	ITA	Andrea Costa
4	DF	ARG	Matías Rodríguez
5	MF	BRA	Renan
6	MF	ITA	Enzo Maresca
7	DF	ITA	Paolo Castellini
8	DF	GER	Shkodran Mustafi
10	FW	ARG	Maxi López (on loan from Catania)
11	MF	ITA	Gianni Munari
12	FW	ITA	Gianluca Sansone
13	DF	SUI	Gaetano Berardi
14	MF	ESP	Pedro Obiang
15	DF	DEN	Simon Poulsen

No.	Pos.	Nation	Player
16	MF	ITA	Andrea Poli
17	MF	ITA	Angelo Palombo (captain)
19	DF	ITA	Lorenzo De Silvestri (on loan from Fiorentina)
21	MF	ITA	Roberto Soriano
22	GK	ARG	Sergio Romero
23	FW	BRA	Éder
25	MF	SRB	Nenad Krstičić
28	DF	ITA	Daniele Gastaldello (Vice Captain)
32	GK	ITA	Tommaso Berni
35	DF	SUI	Jonathan Rossini
79	MF	ITA	Davide Gavazzi
93	FW	SUI	Anđelko Savić
98	FW	ARG	Mauro Icardi

== Competitions ==
=== Serie A ===
==== League table ====
Pos	Team	Pld	W	D	L	GF	GA	GD	Pts
12	Chievo	38	12	9	17	37	52	−15	45
13	Bologna	38	11	11	16	46	52	−6	44
14	Sampdoria	38	11	10	17	43	51	−8	42 (Note: Sampdoria and Torino were docked 1 point due to involvement in the 2011–12 Italian football scandal.)
15	Atalanta	38	11	9	18	39	56	−17	40 (Note: Atalanta was docked 2 points due to involvement in the 2011–12 Italian football scandal.)
16	Torino	38	8	16	14	46	55	−9	39

Source: Serie A, Soccerway
Rules for classification: 1st points; 2nd head-to-head points; 3rd head-to-head goal difference; 4th goal difference; 5th number of goals scored; 6th public draw.
(Head-to-head record is applied for clubs with the same number of points only once all matches between said clubs have been played)

==== Results summary ====
Overall								Home						Away					
Pld	W	D	L	GF	GA	GD	Pts	W	D	L	GF	GA	GD	W	D	L	GF	GA	GD
38	11	10	17	43	51	−8	43	8	3	8	25	22	+3	3	7	9	18	29	−11

Last updated: 18 May 2013.
Source: Competitive matches

==== Results by round ====
Round	1	2	3	4	5	6	7	8	9	10	11	12	13	14	15	16	17	18	19	20	21	22	23	24	25	26	27	28	29	30	31	32	33	34	35	36	37	38
Ground	A	H	A	H	A	H	A	A	H	A	H	A	H	H	A	H	A	H	A	H	A	H	A	H	A	H	H	A	H	A	H	A	A	H	A	H	A	H
Result	W	W	W	D	D	L	L	L	L	L	L	L	W	W	D	L	L	L	W	D	L	W	D	W	D	W	W	L	L	D	L	D	D	L	L	D	L	W
Position	8	4	4	3	3	5	7	7	9	14	15	15	15	11	12	12	14	15	14	14	14	13	14	11	12	10	10	10	10	12	14	14	13	14	15	14	15	14

Updated to match(es) played on 18 May 2013. Source: Competitive matches
A = Away; H = Home; W = Win; D = Draw; L = Loss

==== Matches ====
26 August 2012 1	Milan	0–1	Sampdoria	Milan
18:00 CEST (UTC+02:00)			Costa 59'	Stadium: San Siro; Attendance: 49,000; Referee: Luca Banti

2 September 2012 2	Sampdoria	2–1	Siena	Genoa
20:45 CEST (UTC+02:00)	López 45'; Gastaldello 68'		Vergassola 62'	Stadium: Stadio Luigi Ferraris; Attendance: 36,700; Referee: Gianluca Rocchi

16 September 2012 3	Pescara	2–3	Sampdoria	Pescara
15:00 CEST (UTC+02:00)	Çelik 75'; Caprari 90'		López 31', 76'; Estigarribia 60'	Stadium: Stadio Adriatico; Attendance: 22,000; Referee: Riccardo Pinzani

23 September 2012 4	Sampdoria	1–1	Torino	Genoa
12:30 CEST (UTC+02:00)	Pozzi 84' (pen.)		Bianchi 69' (pen.)	Stadium: Stadio Luigi Ferraris; Attendance: 22,000; Referee: Giampaolo Calvarese

26 September 2012 5	Roma	1–1	Sampdoria	Rome
20:45 CEST (UTC+02:00)	Totti 35'		Munari 62'	Stadium: Stadio Olimpico; Attendance: 37,125; Referee: Paolo Mazzoleni

30 September 2012 6	Sampdoria	0–1	Napoli	Genoa
15:00 CEST (UTC+02:00)			Cavani 68' (pen.)	Stadium: Stadio Luigi Ferraris; Attendance: 24,715; Referee: Paolo Tagliavento

6 October 2012 7	Chievo	2–1	Sampdoria	Verona
18:00 CEST (UTC+02:00)	Théréau 45+2'; Di Michele 87'		Maresca 61'	Stadium: Stadio Marc'Antonio Bentegodi; Attendance: 10,000; Referee: Andrea Gervasoni

21 October 2012 8	Parma	2–1	Sampdoria	Parma
15:00 CEST (UTC+02:00)	Amauri 36' (pen.), 53'		Éder 81'	Stadium: Stadio Ennio Tardini; Attendance: 14,000; Referee: Sebastiano Peruzzo

28 October 2012 9	Sampdoria	0–1	Cagliari	Genoa
15:00 CET (UTC+01:00)			Dessena 47'	Stadium: Stadio Luigi Ferraris; Attendance: 21,586; Referee: Gianluca Rocchi

31 October 2012 10	Internazionale	3–2	Sampdoria	Milan
20:45 CET (UTC+01:00)	Milito 52' (pen.); Palacio 69'; Guarín 81'		Munari 20'; Éder 90+4'	Stadium: San Siro; Attendance: 41,000; Referee: Daniele Doveri

4 November 2012 11	Sampdoria	1–2	Atalanta	Genoa
15:00 CET (UTC+01:00)	Maresca 53'		Bonaventura 2'; De Luca 76'	Stadium: Stadio Luigi Ferraris; Attendance: 23,000; Referee: Carmine Russo

11 November 2012 12	Palermo	2–0	Sampdoria	Palermo
12:30 CET (UTC+01:00)	Dybala 52', 71'			Stadium: Stadio Renzo Barbera; Attendance: 13,423; Referee: Antonio Giannoccaro

18 November 2012 13	Sampdoria	3–1	Genoa	Genoa
20:45 CET (UTC+01:00)	Poli 16'; Bovo 36' (o.g.); Icardi 88'		Immobile 73'	Stadium: Stadio Luigi Ferraris; Attendance: 22,000; Referee: Paolo Mazzoleni

25 November 2012 14	Sampdoria	1–0	Bologna	Genoa
15:00 CET (UTC+01:00)	Poli 61'			Stadium: Stadio Luigi Ferraris; Attendance: 21,631; Referee: Domenico Celi

2 December 2012 15	Fiorentina	2–2	Sampdoria	Florence
20:45 CET (UTC+01:00)	Savić 22', 75'		Krstičić 48'; Rodríguez 72' (o.g.)	Stadium: Stadio Artemio Franchi; Attendance: 24,049; Referee: Paolo Valeri

10 December 2012 16	Sampdoria	0–2	Udinese	Genoa
19:00 CET (UTC+01:00)			Danilo 17'; Di Natale 28'	Stadium: Stadio Luigi Ferraris; Attendance: 21,400; Referee: Andrea Gervasoni

16 December 2012 17	Catania	3–1	Sampdoria	Catania
15:00 CET (UTC+01:00)	Paglialunga 55'; Bergessio 65'; Castro 90'		Maresca 29' (pen.)	Stadium: Stadio Angelo Massimino; Attendance: 12,000; Referee: Piero Giacomelli

22 December 2012 18	Sampdoria	0–1	Lazio	Genoa
15:00 CET (UTC+01:00)			Hernanes 31'	Stadium: Stadio Luigi Ferraris; Attendance: 23,000; Referee: Nicola Rizzoli

6 January 2013 19	Juventus	1–2	Sampdoria	Turin
15:00 CET (UTC+01:00)	Giovinco 24' (pen.)		Icardi 52', 68'	Stadium: Juventus Stadium; Attendance: 38,000; Referee: Paolo Valeri

13 January 2013 20	Sampdoria	0–0	Milan	Genoa
20:45 CET (UTC+01:00)				Stadium: Stadio Luigi Ferraris; Attendance: 24,544; Referee: Marco Guida

20 January 2013 21	Siena	1–0	Sampdoria	Siena
15:00 CET (UTC+01:00)	Bogdani 71'			Stadium: Stadio Artemio Franchi - Montepaschi Arena; Attendance: 7,961; Referee: Carmine Russo

27 January 2013 22	Sampdoria	6–0	Pescara	Genoa
15:00 CET (UTC+01:00)	Éder 31' (pen.); Icardi 42', 56', 58', 71'; Obiang 50'			Stadium: Stadio Luigi Ferraris; Attendance: 23,000; Referee: Dino Tommasi

2 February 2013 23	Torino	0–0	Sampdoria	Turin
18:00 CET (UTC+01:00)				Stadium: Stadio Olimpico di Torino; Attendance: 14,000; Referee: Nicola Rizzoli

10 February 2013 24	Sampdoria	3–1	Roma	Genoa
15:00 CET (UTC+01:00)	Estigarribia 56'; Sansone 73'; Icardi 77'		Lamela 75'	Stadium: Stadio Luigi Ferraris; Attendance: 23,000; Referee: Domenico Celi

17 February 2013 25	Napoli	0–0	Sampdoria	Naples
15:00 CET (UTC+01:00)				Stadium: Stadio San Paolo; Attendance: 37,000; Referee: Daniele Doveri

24 February 2013 26	Sampdoria	2–0	Chievo	Genoa
12:30 CET (UTC+01:00)	Poli 33'; Éder 83'			Stadium: Stadio Luigi Ferraris; Attendance: 23,000; Referee: Eugenio Abbattista

3 March 2013 27	Sampdoria	1–0	Parma	Genoa
15:00 CET (UTC+01:00)	Icardi 58'			Stadium: Stadio Luigi Ferraris; Attendance: 22,489; Referee: Paolo Valeri

10 March 2013 28	Cagliari	3–1	Sampdoria	Quartu Sant'Elena
15:00 CET (UTC+01:00)	Ibarbo 18', 53', 72'		López 90+1' (pen.)	Stadium: Stadio Is Arenas; Attendance: 10,000; Referee: Davide Massa

30 March 2013 30	Atalanta	0–0	Sampdoria	Bergamo
15:00 CET (UTC+01:00)				Stadium: Stadio Atleti Azzurri d'Italia; Attendance: 14,000; Referee: Andrea Romeo

3 April 2013 29	Sampdoria	0–2	Internazionale	Genoa
18:30 CEST (UTC+02:00)			Palacio 43', 90+3'	Stadium: Stadio Luigi Ferraris; Attendance: 25,258; Referee: Luca Banti

7 April 2013 31	Sampdoria	1–3	Palermo	Genoa
15:00 CEST (UTC+02:00)	Munari 43'		Von Bergen 35'; Iličić 50'; García 56'	Stadium: Stadio Luigi Ferraris; Attendance: 23,000; Referee: Marco Guida

14 April 2013 32	Genoa	1–1	Sampdoria	Genoa
15:00 CEST (UTC+02:00)	Matuzalém 80'		Éder 28'	Stadium: Stadio Luigi Ferraris; Attendance: 19,000; Referee: Daniele Orsato

21 April 2013 33	Bologna	1–1	Sampdoria	Bologna
15:00 CEST (UTC+02:00)	Gilardino 23'		Sansone 59'	Stadium: Stadio Renato Dall'Ara; Attendance: 21,000; Referee: Sebastiano Peruzzo

28 April 2013 34	Sampdoria	0–3	Fiorentina	Genoa
15:00 CEST (UTC+02:00)			Cuadrado 36'; Ljajić 41'; Aquilani 73'	Stadium: Stadio Luigi Ferraris; Attendance: 23,000; Referee: Nicola Rizzoli

5 May 2013 35	Udinese	3–1	Sampdoria	Udine
12:30 CEST (UTC+02:00)	Di Natale 29', 52'; Muriel 87'		Éder 34'	Stadium: Stadio Friuli; Attendance: 15,000; Referee: Paolo Tagliavento

8 May 2013 36	Sampdoria	1–1	Catania	Genoa
20:45 CEST (UTC+02:00)	De Silvestri 36'		Spolli 68'	Stadium: Stadio Luigi Ferraris; Attendance: 23,000; Referee: Domenico Celi

12 May 2013 37	Lazio	2–0	Sampdoria	Rome
15:00 CEST (UTC+02:00)	Floccari 10'; Candreva 90+4' (pen.)			Stadium: Stadio Olimpico; Attendance: 32,000; Referee: Andrea Romeo

18 May 2013 38	Sampdoria	3–2	Juventus	Genoa
20:45 CEST (UTC+02:00)	Éder 31' (pen.); De Silvestri 57'; Icardi 75'		Quagliarella 25'; Giaccherini 90+1'	Stadium: Stadio Luigi Ferraris; Attendance: 23,000; Referee: Andrea Gervasoni

=== Coppa Italia ===
18 August 2012 Third round	Juve Stabia	1–1 (a.e.t.) (4–3 p)	Sampdoria	Castellammare di Stabia
20:30 CEST (UTC+02:00)	Danilevičius 90+1'	Report	López 83'	Stadium: Stadio Romeo Menti; Attendance: 3,988; Referee: Domenico Celi
	Penalties
	Erpen (penalty scored); Agyei (penalty missed); Di Cuonzo (penalty scored); Scognamiglio (penalty scored); Danilevičius (penalty scored)		(penalty missed) Poli; (penalty scored) Estigarribia; (penalty scored) Costa; (penalty scored) Soriano; (penalty missed) López

== Squad statistics ==
=== Appearances and goals ===
No.	Pos	Nat	Player	Total		Serie A		Coppa Italia	
No.	Pos	Nat	Player	Apps	Goals	Apps	Goals	Apps	Goals
Goalkeepers
1	GK	(Brazil) BRA	Júnior da Costa	4	0	4	0	0	0
22	GK	(Argentina) ARG	Sergio Romero	33	0	32	0	1	0
32	GK	(Italy) ITA	Tommaso Berni	3	0	2+1	0	0	0
Defenders
3	DF	(Italy) ITA	Andrea Costa	28	1	27	1	1	0
4	DF	(Argentina) ARG	Matías Rodríguez	1	0	1	0	0	0
7	DF	(Italy) ITA	Paolo Castellini	8	0	4+3	0	0+1	0
8	DF	(Germany) GER	Shkodran Mustafi	17	0	12+5	0	0	0
13	DF	(Switzerland) SUI	Gaetano Berardi	21	0	18+3	0	0	0
15	DF	(Denmark) DEN	Simon Poulsen	7	0	3+4	0	0	0
19	DF	(Italy) ITA	Lorenzo De Silvestri	25	2	19+5	2	1	0
28	DF	(Italy) ITA	Daniele Gastaldello	34	1	33	1	1	0
35	DF	(Switzerland) SUI	Jonathan Rossini	26	0	24+1	0	1	0
Midfielders
2	MF	(Paraguay) PAR	Marcelo Estigarribia	35	2	29+5	2	1	0
5	MF	(Brazil) BRA	Renan	5	0	3+2	0	0	0
6	MF	(Italy) ITA	Enzo Maresca	16	3	15+1	3	0	0
11	MF	(Italy) ITA	Gianni Munari	28	3	14+13	3	1	0
14	MF	(Spain) ESP	Pedro Obiang	35	1	32+2	1	1	0
16	MF	(Italy) ITA	Andrea Poli	32	3	31	3	1	0
17	MF	(Italy) ITA	Angelo Palombo	15	0	15	0	0	0
21	MF	(Italy) ITA	Roberto Soriano	25	0	8+16	0	0+1	0
25	MF	(Serbia) SRB	Nenad Krstičić	26	1	22+3	1	1	0
Forwards
10	FW	(Argentina) ARG	Maxi López	18	5	9+8	4	0+1	1
12	FW	(Italy) ITA	Gianluca Sansone	14	2	6+8	2	0	0
23	FW	(Brazil) BRA	Éder	30	7	24+6	7	0	0
93	FW	(Switzerland) SUI	Anđelko Savić	1	0	0+1	0	0	0
98	FW	(Argentina) ARG	Mauro Icardi	31	10	24+7	10	0	0
Players transferred out during the season
9	FW	(Italy) ITA	Nicola Pozzi	7	1	1+5	1	1	0
12	MF	(Argentina) ARG	Fernando Tissone	12	0	6+6	0	0	0

Last updated: 28 October 2012
Source: Competitions

=== Top scorers ===
This includes all competitive matches. The list is sorted by shirt number when total goals are equal.

R	No.	Pos	Nat	Name	Serie A	Coppa Italia	Total
1	98	FW	(Argentina)	Mauro Icardi	10	0	10
2	23	FW	(Brazil)	Éder	7	0	7
3	10	FW	(Argentina)	Maxi López	4	1	5
4	6	MF	(Italy)	Enzo Maresca	3	0	3
=	11	MF	(Italy)	Gianni Munari	3	0	3
=	16	MF	(Italy)	Andrea Poli	3	0	3
7				Own goals	2	0	2
=	2	MF	(Paraguay)	Marcelo Estigarribia	2	0	2
=	12	FW	(Italy)	Gianluca Sansone	2	0	2
=	19	DF	(Italy)	Lorenzo De Silvestri	2	0	2
11	3	DF	(Italy)	Andrea Costa	1	0	1
=	9	FW	(Italy)	Nicola Pozzi	1	0	1
=	14	MF	(Spain)	Pedro Obiang	1	0	1
=	25	MF	(Serbia)	Nenad Krstičić	1	0	1
=	28	DF	(Italy)	Daniele Gastaldello	1	0	1

Last updated: 28 October 2012
Source: Competitions
