= Matteo Scapini =

Italian footballer

Personal information
- Date of birth: 28 September 1983 (age 43)
- Place of birth: Bovolone, Italy
- Height: 1.85 m (6 ft 1 in)
- Position: Forward

Youth career
- Vicenza

Senior career*
Years	Team	Apps	(Gls)
2003–2006	Vicenza	0	(0)
2003–2004	→ SPAL (loan)	10	(0)
2004	→ Belluno (loan)	13	(5)
2004–2005	→ Valenzana (loan)	21	(6)
2005–2006	→ Pro Vercelli (loan)	15	(2)
2006	→ Valenzana (loan)	8	(2)
2006–2007	PortoSummaga	12	(3)
2007	→ Montichiari (loan)	9	(3)
2007–2008	Cuneo	31	(22)
2008–2011	Verona	31	(3)
2009–2010	→ Pro Vercelli (loan)	30	(3)
2010	Verona	5	(0)
2010–2011	Villafranca	30	(18)
2012–2013	Sambonifacese	30	(14)
2013–2015	Virtus Verona	64	(26)
2015–2016	Seregno	29	(14)
2016–2017	Varese	26	(12)
2017–2018	Ciserano	4	(0)
2018	Crema	5	(2)
2018–2019	Ciliverghe	11	(1)
2019	GSD Ambrosiana	18	(5)
2019	Villafranca	9	(0)
2019–2020	Team S. Lucia Golosine		
Total		411	(141)
- * Club domestic league appearances and goals

Matteo Scapini (born 28 September 1983) is an Italian former footballer who plays as a forward.

== Biography ==
=== Vicenza & loans ===
Born in Bovolone, the Province of Verona, Veneto, Scapini started his career at Veneto side Vicenza. In mid-2003 he left for SPAL and in January 2004 back to Veneto for Belluno. In July 2004 he left for Piedmont side Valenzana. In July 2005 he was transferred to Pro Vercelli, also in Piedmont and Serie C2. In January 2006 returned to Valenza, also from Serie C2/A.

=== Portogruaro & Cuneo ===
In August 2006 he was sold to Veneto side PortoSummaga in co-ownership deal. In January 2007 he was loaned to fellow Serie C2 Group A side Montichiari, which he played the both matches against PortoSummaga in relegation "play-out", as the losing side. In June 2007 Vicenza gave up the remain 50% registration rights but Scapini was sold to Serie C2/A side Cuneo in July (also a Piedmont side), after PortoSummaga reassigned to Group B. He scored a career record of 22 goals, over half of the team scored. However, Cuneo also relegated by losing the relegation "play-out" matches. He scored one goal and the team losing in 1–2 to Valenzana in aggregate. In June both clubs failed to agree the price on the remain 50% rights and they both submitted its figure to Lega Pro to decide. On 27 June Lega Pro announced that PortoSummaga acquired him.

=== Verona ===
However, he was sold to newly relegated Prima Divisione (ex- Serie C1) team Hellas Verona in July, in another co-ownership deal, his second Prima Divisione club since he left SPAL 4 1/2 years ago. He only able to score 3 league goals, and in June PortoSummaga gave up the remain 50% registration rights to Verona. In August he returned to Seconda Divisione for Pro Belvedere Vercelli, which also represented the comune of Vercelli. The team relegated and he only scored 3 goals. Despite the team later re-admitted to Seconda Divisione and renamed as Pro Vercelli, the team did not buy Scapini.

In 2010–11 season, he only added 4 more games to his Prima Divisione career. He also suspended 1 month and 10 days by FIGC for employed an un-registered agent Alessandro D'Amico during the suspension of Andrea D'Amico, both from the company P.D.P. srl, in his transfer to P.B. Vercelli; Verona won the promotion play-offs and Scapini was released along with Robert Anderson, Stefano Garzon and Andy Selva.

=== Serie D ===
From 2012 to 2020 he is played for many teams of Serie D (a part 2013–14 season with Virtus Verona in Serie C2, with 8 goals). The best year was with Villafranca, when he's scored 18 goals.

=== Later career ===
In December 2019, Scapini joined ACD Team Santa Lucia Golosine.
