= Tom (footballer, born 1988) =

Brazilian footballer (born 1988)

Personal information
- Full name: Wellington Teixeira dos Montes
- Date of birth: 21 June 1988 (age 38)
- Place of birth: Guaramirim, Brazil
- Position: Left back

Senior career*
| Years | Team | Apps | (Gls) |
| 2007–2011 | Brusque | 7 | (0) |
| 2007 | → União de Timbó (loan) | 0 | (0) |
| 2009 | → Portuguesa Santista (loan) | 0 | (0) |
| 2010 | → Metropolitano (loan) | 2 | (0) |
| 2011 | → Hercílio Luz (loan) | 0 | (0) |
| 2012 | Uberaba | 0 | (0) |
| 2012 | Catania | 1 | (0) |
| 2012 | Koper | 8 | (0) |
- * Club domestic league appearances and goals as of 17:40, 18 November 2012 (UTC)

Wellington Teixeira dos Montes, also known as Tom (born 21 June 1988), is a Brazilian footballer.

== Club career ==
=== Brusque ===
Tom began his career with Brazilian side Brusque in January 2007, signing a 5-year contract. With Brusque, he won Copa Santa Catarina as well as Recopa Sul-Brasileira in 2008. He never established himself as a first team player in the squad, however, and left on loan to other clubs, such as União de Timbó in 2007, Portuguesa Santista in 2009, Metropolitano in 2012, and Hercílio Luz in 2011. All four of the aforementioned loan deals took place in the second half of each year, when the Campeonato Catarinense state league had ended. He briefly played in the national level for Metropolitano in 2010 Campeonato Brasileiro Série D and he also scored 3 goals in the 2011 state league second division. Tom also scored once for Portuguesa Santista in 2009 Copa Paulista. (round 5 winning São Bernardo 2–0) After just 7 national league appearances for Brusque during his four-year tenure, Tom transferred to Uberaba Sport Club.

=== Uberaba ===
Shortly after his contract with Brusque expired, Tom signed a short-term contract with Uberaba until the end of Campeonato Mineiro. Tom only played once for the club on 29 January 2012 in a match against América de Teófilo Otoni.

=== Calcio Catania ===
On 31 January 2012 (around 30 January Brazil time), Tom was signed by Italian Serie A club Calcio Catania on a 3 1/2-year contract. His transfer was mostly down to the will of former club CEO, Pietro Lo Monaco, who, upon Tom's arrival, was quoted, "He is a left back capable of running on the whole side. He's a pure left handed. I took him because I think he will be the new Martinho. By his style of play, he reminds me of him a lot." Tom wore no.15 shirt for Catania. Tom made his Serie A debut on 13 May 2012, as an 85th-minute substitute on the 38th and final match-day against Udinese. This would eventually turn out to be his only appearance for the Sicilian club.

=== Koper ===
On 19 July 2012, Tom signed for the Slovenian PrvaLiga club Koper for an undisclosed fee.
