= ASD SC Palazzolo =

Italian football club

S.C. Palazzolo
- Full name: A.S.D. Sport Club Palazzolo
- Founded: 1954; 72 years ago
- League: Eccellenza Sicily
- 2018–19: Eccellenza Sicily Group B, 2nd

A.S.D. Sport Club Palazzolo, known as S.C. Palazzolo or just Palazzolo, is an Italian football club based in Palazzolo Acreide, in the province of Syracuse, Sicily. As of 2019–20 season, the club played in the Eccellenza Sicily division.

founded in 1954, the club itself claimed as the successor of the original football club of the comune, which first founded in 1954 and participated in the Prima Categoria in 1955–56 season. The major club of the comune, A.C. Palazzolo A.S.D., relocated to the provincial capital also in 2013.

== History ==
A.S.D. S.C. Palazzolo was founded in 2013 after the major football club of the comune, A.C. Palazzolo A.S.D., relocated to the provincial capital as A.S.D. Città di Siracusa. The foundation of S.C. Palazzolo was in fact utilized the registration of another club C.S.D. Enzo Grasso, which focused on futsal since 2013 and splitting the registration at FIGC. S.C. Palazzolo also participated in the division Promozione Sicily immediately, which previously participated by Enzo Grasso.

Despite the club finished as the fifth of 2014–15 Promozione Sicily, the team was promoted to Eccellenza Sicily to fill the vacancies.

S.C. Palazzolo won 2016–17 Eccellenza Sicily, the fifth level of Italian football pyramid in April 2017. The club promoted directly to Serie D, the fourth level of the pyramid as well as the top division of non professional league. However, S.C. Palazzolo was relegated at the end of 2017–18 Serie D season.

In 2018–19 season the club signed former professional footballer Fernando Spinelli as well as other. The club finished as the runner-up at the group stage as well as losing finalist in the promotion playoffs.

== Players ==
=== Current squad ===
As of 10 April 2020

Note: Flags indicate national team as defined under FIFA eligibility rules; some limited exceptions apply. Players may hold more than one non-FIFA nationality.

No.	Pos.	Nation	Player
—	GK	ITA	Giuseppe Agliano
—	GK	ITA	Carlo Incatasciato
—	GK	ITA	Virgilio Vitale
—	DF	ITA	Gianmarco Argentino
—	DF	ITA	Stefano Boncaldo
—	DF		Omar Diop
—	DF	ITA	Manuel Illustre
—	DF	ITA	Salvatore Mollica
—	DF	ITA	Sebastiano Peluso
—	DF	ITA	Andrea Punzi
—	MF	ITA	Fabio Calì
—	MF	GUI	Alpha Camara
—	MF	ITA	Rosario Costantino
—	MF	ITA	Francesco Curione

No.	Pos.	Nation	Player
—	MF	ITA	Andrea D'Amico
—	MF	ITA	Enrico Di Stefano
—	MF	ITA	Claudio Fichera
—	MF	ITA	Giuseppe Grasso
—	MF	ITA	Francesco Marra
—	MF	ITA	Vincenzo Pepe
—	MF	ITA	Pandolfo Sebastiano
—	MF	ARG	Fernando Spinelli
—	MF	ITA	Cosimo Sprovieri
—	FW	ITA	Francesco Bonfiglio
—	FW	ITA	Alessandro Codagnone
—	FW	GUI	Thierno Ibrahima Diallo
—	FW	ITA	Jonis Khoris
—	FW	ITA	Emanuele Testardi

== Honours ==
- Eccellenza Sicily
  - 2017
