= Emanuele Testardi =

Italian footballer (born 1990)

Personal information
- Date of birth: 31 December 1990 (age 35)
- Place of birth: Rome, Italy
- Height: 1.89 m (6 ft 2 in)
- Position: Forward

Youth career
- Libertas Centocelle
- 2006–2010: Pescara
- 2009–2010: → Sampdoria (loan)

Senior career*
Years	Team	Apps	(Gls)
2008–2010	Pescara	6	(0)
2009–2010	→ Sampdoria (loan)	5	(0)
2010–2014	Sampdoria	0	(0)
2010–2011	→ Gubbio (loan)	11	(0)
2011–2012	→ Pergocrema (loan)	14	(4)
2012	→ Siracusa (loan)	13	(5)
2012–2013	→ Virtus Lanciano (loan)	9	(0)
2013	→ Südtirol (loan)	9	(2)
2013–2014	→ Honvéd (loan)	8	(0)
2014–2015	Lupa Roma	8	(3)
2015	Arezzo	6	(0)
2015	Città di Siracusa	10	(4)
2015–2016	Potenza	14	(4)
2016	San Severo	9	(4)
2016–2017	Gozzano	18	(12)
2017	Acireale	10	(4)
2017–2018	Crema	6	(3)
2018	Gozzano	1	(0)
2018	Casale	7	(1)
2019	Adelaide Blue Eagles		
2019	Palazzolo		
2019–2020	Pomezia Calcio	11	(1)
2020–2021	San Domenico Savio Asti		
2021–2022	Saluzzo	6	(0)
2022	FC Spinea 1966		
2022–2023	ASD Euganea Rovolon		
2023–2024	USD Montebello		
Total		175	(47)

International career
2010	Italy U20	1	(0)
- * Club domestic league appearances and goals

Emanuele Testardi (born 31 December 1990) is an Italian former footballer who plays as a forward.

== Biography ==
Born in Rome, Lazio, Testardi started his professional career at Pescara. he played for the reserve since 2006–07 season. He was signed from Libertas Centocelle in 2006, a Rome club located in Centocelle, the 7th municipi of Rome.

=== Sampdoria ===
On 31 August 2009, he was loaned to Sampdoria. He made his Serie A debut for U.C. Sampdoria on 28 February 2010 in a game against Parma F.C.

In June 2010, Sampdoria bought him outright, for €450,000, with Danilo Soddimo moved to Pescara outright for €300,000. In July 2010, he was loaned to Gubbio. On 31 January 2011, he was about to join Foligno but the deal was not finished in time. He played for Sampdoria's Primavera team instead as overage player, partnered with Simone Zaza.

=== Lupa Roma ===
Testardi was released on 18 July 2014. In summer 2014 he was signed by Lupa Roma F.C.

=== Arezzo ===
Circa January 2015 Testardi was signed by Arezzo.

=== Siracusa ===
In summer 2015 he was signed by Città di Siracusa.

=== SC Palazzolo ===
On 7 August 2019, Testardi joined Eccellenza club Palazzolo.
