= Jonis Khoris =

Italian footballer

Personal information
- Date of birth: 15 March 1989 (age 37)
- Place of birth: Siderno, Italy
- Height: 1.82 m (5 ft 11 1/2 in)
- Positions: Midfielder; forward

Team information
- Current team: Castrovillari

Youth career
- Genoa
- 2005–2009: Reggina
- 2006–2007: → Vibonese (loan)
- 2009: → Ravenna (loan)

Senior career*
Years	Team	Apps	(Gls)
2006–2009	Reggina	0	(0)
2006–2007	→ Vibonese (loan)	3	(0)
2009	→ Ravenna (loan)	1	(0)
2009	Taranto	0	(0)
2009–2010	Barletta	7	(0)
2010–2012	Reggina	0	(0)
2011	→ Lucchese (loan)	1	(0)
2011–2012	→ Giulianova (loan)	7	(0)
2012–2013	HinterReggio	28	(10)
2013–2014	Gavorrano	7	(0)
2014	Montalto	9	(3)
2014–2015	Roccella	17	(2)
2015	Due Torri	3	(1)
2015–2016	Gallipoli	7	(1)
2016	Castrovillari	13	(1)
2016–2017	Civitavecchia		
2017	Locri	5	(2)
2017–2018	Siderno	18	(14)
2018	Sant'Agata	12	(6)
2018–2019	Corigliano Calabro	10	(3)
2019	Palazzolo		
2019–2020	Roccella	10	(7)
2020–2021	Paternò	8	(2)
2021	Biancavilla	22	(10)
2021–2022	Gelbison	18	(5)
2022	Vis Artena	7	(0)
2022–2023	Vastogirardi	9	(0)
2023	Ragusa	6	(1)
2023–	Castrovillari	4	(0)
- * Club domestic league appearances and goals as of 20 December 2023

Jonis Khoris (born 15 March 1989) is an Italian footballer who plays for Serie D club Castrovillari.

== Biography ==
Born in Siderno, region of Calabria, some sources claim that he was born in Bucharest, Romania. However, he clarified that he was not born in Bucharest. Khoris started his career in Genoa before returned to southern Italy, for Reggina in January 2005. In 2006–07 season he was loaned to Vibonese of Serie C2. He made his club debut for Reggina in January 2008, losing to Inter Milan 0–3. Before the match Reggina already losing the first leg of 2007–08 Coppa Italia. In January 2009, he was loaned to Prima Divisione club Ravenna with option to sign outright. He played once in first team and also played for its Berretti team, the top team in youth ranks.

In 2009–10 season, at first he joined Taranto on reported free transfer, which he appeared in 2009–10 Coppa Italia as unused sub. In August 2009 signed an annual contract with Barletta. In February 2010 he was released.

In November 2010, he re-joined Reggina on reported 3-year contract. On 26 January 2011 he was loaned to Lucchese. In 2011–12 season, he picked unoccupied no.8 shirt. The shirt remained unoccupied after the departure of Khoris until January 2012 the arrival of Marco Armellino.

On 29 August 2011, he joined Giulianova. However, in January 2012 he was sent back to Reggio Calabria. In July 2012 he joined HinterReggio.

On 30 July 2013, Khoris was signed by Empoli on free transfer, with team-mate Antonio Angelino joined the Tuscan team a day later. On 12 August 2013 Khoris joined Gavorrano in co-ownership deal. Gavorrano also signed Angelino outright from Empoli on 8 August.
