= Fernando Spinelli =

Italian Argentine footballer

Personal information
- Full name: Fernando Horacio Spinelli
- Date of birth: 26 August 1982 (age 44)
- Place of birth: Buenos Aires, Argentina
- Height: 1.83 m (6 ft 0 in)
- Position: Midfielder

Team information
- Current team: Spezia (assistant manager)

Youth career
- Chievo

Senior career*
Years	Team	Apps	(Gls)
2004	Pahang		
2004–2005	Paolana		
2005–2006	Ragusa		
2006–2008	Andria	62	(9)
2008–2009	Cosenza	16	(0)
2009	Taranto	6	(0)
2010	Cavese	13	(1)
2010–2012	Siracusa	60	(2)
2012–2014	Trapani	17	(1)
2014	Pavia	11	(0)
2014–2015	Viterbese Castrense	12	(1)
2015	AlbinoLeffe	16	(2)
2015–2018	Siracusa	90	(1)
2018–2021	SC Palazzolo		
2021	Akragas		
Total		303	(17)

Managerial career
- 2023–2024: Siracusa (youth)
- 2024: Siracusa
- * Club domestic league appearances and goals

Fernando Spinelli (born 26 August 1982) is a football coach and former footballer who is currently as a assistant manager for Spezia. Born and raised in Argentina, he also has Italian citizenship.

== Playing career ==
=== Early career ===
Spinelli played for Chievo's youth team in 2000–01 Campionato Nazionale Primavera season.

Spinelli joined Malaysian club Pahang in December 2003.

=== Italian clubs ===
Spinelli went back to Italy and joined Eccellenza Calabria club Paolana in 2004–05 season.

He then left for Ragusa after released by Paolana.

From 2006 to 2008 he played for Andria.

In July 2008 Spinelli and Emanuele Catania were signed by another club Cosenza. In January 2009 Spinelli left for Taranto.

Spinelli was signed by Cavese in December 2009. He made his debut for that club in league in January 2010.

At the start of 2010–11 Lega Pro Prima Divisione season, he joined U.S. Siracusa. The first team of that club folded in 2012.

In the same transfer window, Spinelli joined Trapani. The club won a promotion to Serie B in 2013.

Spinelli was assigned number 5 shirt at the start of 2013–14 Serie B season.

After half a season without any league appearance, Spinelli joined Pavia in January 2014, along with Trapani new signing Marcello Mancosu, which Trapani decided to loan out the player.

In mid-2014, he joined Viterbese Castrense.

Spinelli joined Lega Pro club AlbinoLeffe in January 2015.

In August 2015, Spinelli return to the city of Syracuse for A.S.D. Città di Siracusa, an illegitimate phoenix club of 2012 folded U.S. Siracusa. The club was relocated from Palazzolo Acreide to Syracuse in 2013 and then renamed. The club won the Group I of 2015–16 Serie D season. The club also renamed to Siracusa Calcio circa 2016.

Spinelli remained in Syracuse for 2016–17 Lega Pro season. He signed a new contract in June 2017.

In 2018 Spinelli left for Eccellenza Sicily club S.C. Palazzolo, an illegitimate phoenix club of the 2013 relocated A.C. Palazzolo. It was reported that he was released in September 2019, however, he returned to the squad in the same season.

== Coaching career ==
On 30 March 2024, after a few experiences as a youth coach, Spinelli was promoted head coach of Serie D club Siracusa. Under his tenure, Siracusa completed the regular season in second place and successively won the post-season playoff tournament, defeating LFA Reggio Calabria in the final. He successively stayed in at Siracusa as assistant to new head coach Marco Turati.
