= Rosario Costantino =

Italian football player

Personal information
- Date of birth: 4 March 1997 (age 29)
- Place of birth: Palermo, Italy
- Height: 1.84 m (6 ft 1/2 in)
- Position: Midfielder

Team information
- Current team: SC Palazzolo

Youth career
- –2016: Palermo

Senior career*
Years	Team	Apps	(Gls)
2016–2019	Palermo	0	(0)
2016–2017	→ Gubbio (loan)	1	(0)
2017–2018	→ Fano (loan)	1	(0)
2019–	SC Palazzolo		
- * Club domestic league appearances and goals as of 16 December 2017

Rosario Costantino (born 4 March 1997) is an Italian football player who plays for SC Palazzolo.

== Club career ==
He made his Serie C debut for Gubbio on 22 October 2016 in a game against Ancona.

In October 2019, Costantino joined SC Palazzolo.
