= Keko (footballer, born 1991) =

Spanish footballer, born in 1991

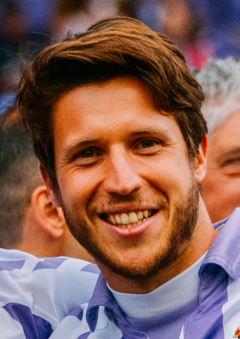
- Keko with Valladolid in 2019

Personal information
- Full name: Sergio Gontán Gallardo
- Date of birth: 27 December 1991 (age 34)
- Place of birth: Brunete, Spain
- Height: 1.77 m (5 ft 10 in)
- Position: Winger

Youth career
- 2004–2008: Atlético Madrid

Senior career*
Years	Team	Apps	(Gls)
2008–2010	Atlético Madrid B	43	(6)
2009–2011	Atlético Madrid	1	(0)
2010	→ Valladolid (loan)	13	(0)
2010–2011	→ Cartagena (loan)	14	(0)
2011	→ Girona (loan)	11	(0)
2011–2014	Catania	23	(1)
2012	→ Grosseto (loan)	10	(0)
2014–2015	Albacete	33	(6)
2015–2016	Eibar	29	(3)
2016–2020	Málaga	50	(0)
2018–2019	→ Valladolid (loan)	26	(2)
2020–2021	Deportivo La Coruña	23	(2)
2022–2023	Sacramento Republic	63	(9)
2024–2025	San Diego Sockers (indoor)	22	(9)

International career
2007	Spain U16	4	(0)
2007–2008	Spain U17	11	(5)
2009	Spain U18	3	(1)
2009–2010	Spain U19	10	(3)
Medal record
Men's football
Representing Spain
UEFA European Under-17 Championship
Winner	2008 Turkey
- * Club domestic league appearances and goals as of 23:34, 10 May 2026 (UTC)

Sergio Gontán Gallardo (born 27 December 1991), known as Keko, is a Spanish professional footballer who plays as a right winger.

Developed at Atlético Madrid, he made 112 La Liga appearances for that club, Valladolid, Eibar and Málaga. He also played in Serie A for Catania.

== Club career ==
=== Atlético Madrid ===
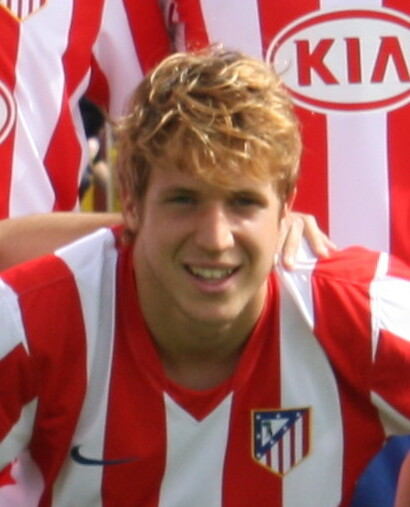
Keko with Atlético Madrid B in 2009

Keko was born in Brunete, Community of Madrid. A product of local Atlético Madrid's youth ranks, he made his first-team – and La Liga – debut on 12 September 2009, taking the field as a 63rd-minute substitute for Florent Sinama Pongolle in a 1–1 home draw against Racing de Santander, aged just 17. Speaking to Diario AS after the match, he said: "The truth is that I have always dreamed of playing in this stadium, despite the draw, it was a dream come true. I did not think about the protests outside the ground, and I only wanted to score. I hope to have more chances, but I have to be calm and see what the coach decides."

Late in January 2010, Keko was loaned to Real Valladolid in the same league until the end of the season. He made his debut for his new team against Valencia, appearing as a late replacement in an eventual 2–0 away loss on 6 February.

Keko split the 2010–11 campaign with two Segunda División sides, Cartagena and Girona, totalling 25 matches (nine starts, 952 minutes) as both managed to retain their league status.

=== Catania ===
On 19 July 2011, after he failed to renew his contract with Atlético Madrid, Keko completed a transfer to Catania in Italy, signing a three-year deal and being awarded the No. 15 jersey at the Sicilian club. On 7 January 2012, however, along with teammate Fabio Sciacca, he joined Serie B's Grosseto on loan.

Keko scored on his Serie A debut on 24 February 2013, starting and contributing to a 2–1 away win over Parma. In May 2014, he was released; valued at €10 million by Catania, he remained unemployed for nearly four months and hired a personal trainer while contemplating leaving football.

=== Albacete ===
On 28 August 2014, Keko signed a 1+1 contract with Albacete, recently promoted to the second tier. He totalled more than 2,500 minutes of action during his only season, notably scoring a brace in a 3–2 victory at Llagostera on 21 May 2015 that confirmed the side's survival.

=== Eibar ===
On 9 July 2015, Keko moved to Eibar in the top division after agreeing to a two-year contract. He scored his first goal in the competition on 30 December, opening the 2–0 home win against Sporting de Gijón.

=== Málaga ===
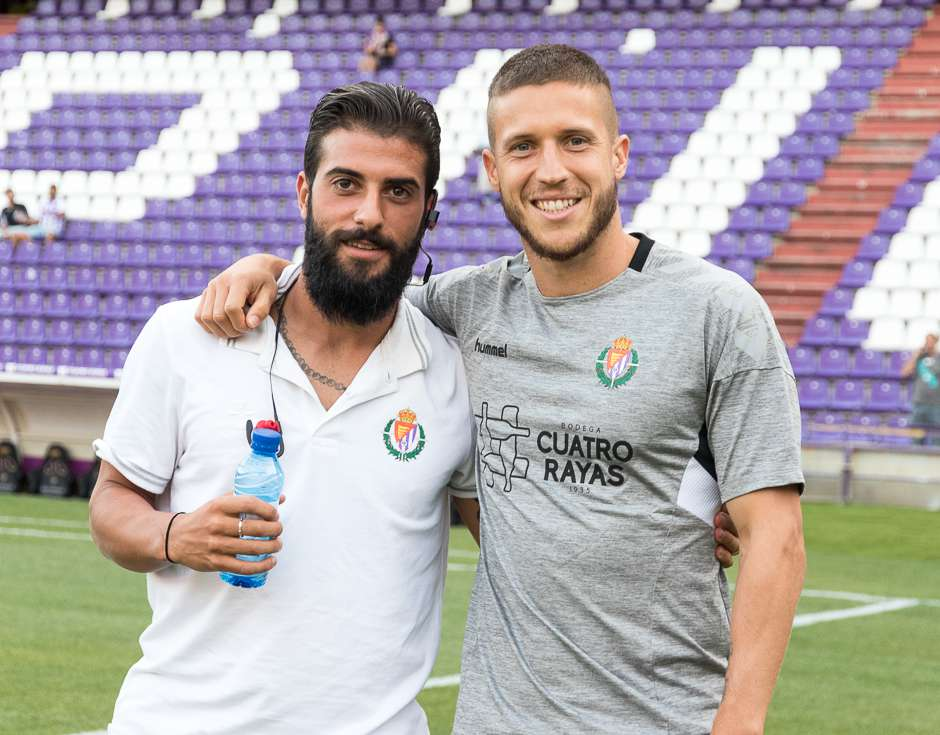
Keko (right) and Daniele Verde with Valladolid in 2018

On 21 June 2016, Keko joined Málaga on a four-year deal. He appeared in 22 scoreless matches in his first season, helping his team to finish in eleventh position.

After suffering relegation, Keko agreed to a one-year loan back at former club Valladolid on 29 July 2018, now in the top flight. On 31 January 2020, he terminated his contract with the Andalusians.

=== Deportivo ===
On 31 January 2020, just hours after leaving Málaga, Keko signed a two-and-a-half-year deal with Deportivo de La Coruña, still in division two. After relegation, he extended it until 2024.

Keko left the Estadio Riazor in August 2021.

=== Sacramento Republic ===
On 11 January 2022, Keko joined Sacramento Republic of the USL Championship for the upcoming season. He made his debut for the Californians on 12 March as a late substitute in a 3–1 home defeat of El Paso Locomotive, concluding the scoring.

Keko played in the final of the U.S. Open Cup on 7 September, which his team lost 3–0 to Major League Soccer club Orlando City, as the third lower-league team to contest the fixture since MLS began in 1996. He left at the end of the 2023 campaign.

=== Later career ===
On 6 December 2024, Keko signed with Major Arena Soccer League club San Diego Sockers.

== International career ==
Keko participated in the 2008 UEFA European Under-17 Championship with Spain, helping his country to eventual victory in the tournament and scoring in the final, a 4–0 win over France.

== Career statistics ==
As of match played 14 March 2021

Appearances and goals by club, season and competition
Club	Season	League			National Cup		Continental		Total	
Club	Season	Division	Apps	Goals	Apps	Goals	Apps	Goals	Apps	Goals
Atlético Madrid B	2008–09	Segunda División B	27	3	—		—		27	3
Atlético Madrid B	2009–10	Segunda División B	16	3	—		—		16	3
Atlético Madrid B	Total		43	6	0	0	0	0	43	6
Atlético Madrid	2008–09	La Liga	0	0	1	0	—		1	0
Atlético Madrid	2009–10	La Liga	1	0	0	0	0	0	1	0
Atlético Madrid	Total		1	0	1	0	0	0	2	0
Valladolid (loan)	2009–10	La Liga	13	0	0	0	—		13	0
Cartagena (loan)	2010–11	Segunda División	14	0	1	0	—		15	0
Girona (loan)	2010–11	Segunda División	11	0	0	0	—		11	0
Catania	2011–12	Serie A	0	0	0	0	—		0	0
Catania	2012–13	Serie A	4	1	1	0	—		5	1
Catania	2013–14	Serie A	19	0	1	0	—		20	0
Catania	Total		23	1	2	0	0	0	25	1
Grosseto (loan)	2011–12	Serie B	10	0	0	0	—		10	0
Albacete	2014–15	Segunda División	33	6	3	0	—		36	6
Eibar	2015–16	La Liga	29	3	3	0	—		32	3
Málaga	2016–17	La Liga	22	0	0	0	—		22	0
Málaga	2017–18	La Liga	21	0	0	0	—		21	0
Málaga	2019–20	Segunda División	7	0	0	0	—		7	0
Málaga	Total		50	0	0	0	0	0	50	0
Valladolid (loan)	2018–19	La Liga	26	2	3	0	—		29	2
Valladolid (loan)	Total Valladolid		39	2	3	0	0	0	42	2
Deportivo La Coruña	2019–20	Segunda División	7	0	0	0	—		7	0
Deportivo La Coruña	2020–21	Segunda División B	11	1	1	0	—		12	1
Deportivo La Coruña	Total		18	1	1	0	0	0	19	1
Career total			271	19	14	0	0	0	285	19

== Honours ==
Spain

- UEFA European Under-17 Championship: 2008
