= Cristian Suarino =

Italian footballer (born 1990)

Personal information
- Date of birth: 23 April 1990 (age 36)
- Place of birth: Naples, Italy
- Position: Midfielder

Team information
- Current team: Aversa Normanna

Youth career
- Catania

Senior career*
Years	Team	Apps	(Gls)
2009–2013	Catania	0	(0)
2010	→ Cassino	3	(0)
2010–2011	→ Milazzo	24	(0)
2011–2012	→ Nocerina	0	(0)
2012–2013	→ Melfi	32	(3)
2013–	Aversa Normanna	0	(0)
Total		59	(3)
- * Club domestic league appearances and goals as of 28 July 2013

Cristian Suarino (born 23 April 1990) is an Italian footballer who plays as a midfielder for Aversa Normanna in the Italian Lega Pro Seconda Divisione.

== Club career ==
A Naples native, Suarino actually began his professional career with Sicilian side, Calcio Catania, where he was promoted from the club's youth academy in 2010. He was sent on a loan deal to Lega Pro Seconda Divisione outfit, S.S. Cassino 1927 in 2010, making 3 first team appearances during his loan period. Following his return to Catania in June 2010, Suarino joined neighboring minnows, S.S. Milazzo on a season-long loan deal where he went on to make 24 league appearances during the 2010-11 statistical season. Following another return to parent-club, Catania, Suarino joined Serie B outfit Nocerina on 30 June 2011 on a new temporary loan deal. With Nocerina, the young midfielder spent much of the 2011-12 Serie B campaign with the youth squad, earning just 6 first team call-ups.

Suarino was then loaned out to the Lega Pro Seconda Divisione for the second time in his career. He joined A.S. Melfi on loan for the 2012–13 Lega Pro season. He was a regular for the club, making 32 league appearances and scoring 3 goals following his official transfer on 19 August 2012. Upon his return to Catania, his contract was terminated by the club on 26 June 2013.

On 27 July 2013, after nearly a month without a club, Suarino signed with S.F. Aversa Normanna as a free agent. He signed for the fourth division club alongside Fabio De Luca.
