= Simone Pesce =

Italian footballer

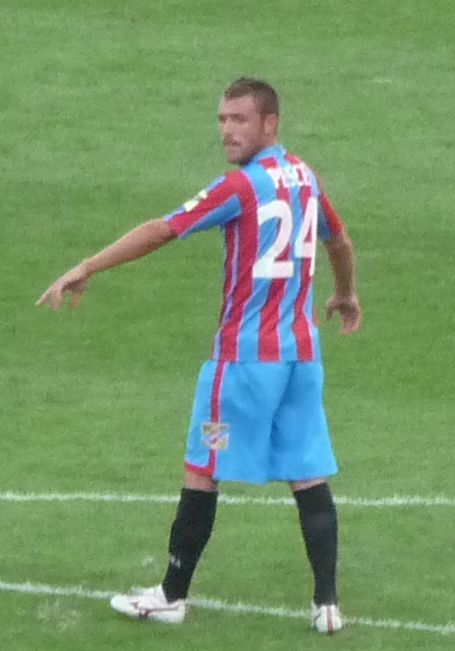

Personal information
- Date of birth: 10 July 1982 (age 44)
- Place of birth: Latina, Italy
- Height: 1.79 m (5 ft 10 in)
- Position: Midfielder

Team information
- Current team: Lumezzane (sporting director)

Senior career*
Years	Team	Apps	(Gls)
1999–2005	Latina	127	(6)
2005–2006	Torres	30	(3)
2006–2009	Ascoli	98	(6)
2009–2011	Catania	12	(1)
2010	→ Ascoli (loan)	20	(0)
2011–2016	Novara	121	(8)
2016–2018	Cremonese	83	(4)
2018–2020	FeralpiSalò	56	(3)
2020–2024	Lumezzane	67	(6)
- * Club domestic league appearances and goals

Simone Pesce (born 10 July 1982) is an Italian football executive and former midfielder, who is the sporting director of Serie C Group A club Lumezzane.

== Career ==
=== Latina ===
Pesce started his career with Italian club Latina in 1999. He remained at the club until 2005, making nearly 130 league appearances and scoring six goals.

=== Sassari Torres ===
After greatly impressing during his five-season spell with Latina, he moved to Serie C side Sassari Torres. In one season with the club, he impressed very much and was signed by then Serie A side Ascoli Calcio 1898 in 2006. With Sassari Torres, he scored three goals in just over 30 appearances.

=== Ascoli ===
Pesce moved to Serie A struggler Ascoli in 2006. He soon became an essential player on the team. The club were also relegated in 2007. Ascoli never managed to threaten a promotion place in 2008 and 2009, in which Pesce scored six goals in a total of 69 Serie B appearances.

Pesce played four matches (2 in the Coppa Italia) in the 2009–10 season before his transfer to Catania.

=== Catania ===
On 31 August 2009, the final day of the transfer market, Calcio Catania announced the signings of Pesce from Ascoli in co-ownership deal for €500 and Giovanni Marchese from A.C. Chievo Verona. The duo were Catania's 15th and 16th signings of the summer as the club looks to improve on their last three Serie A seasons, aiming at UEFA Europa League football for the next season. Catania already negotiated with Ascoli earlier this summer purchasing Giuseppe Bellusci and also selling Vito Falconieri and Marcello Gazzola in co-ownership deals. Pesce failed to make a major impact with the Sicilian club and solidify regular playing time as he made just five appearances, not scoring.

On 30 December 2009, Catania confirmed the transfer of Pesce back to Ascoli on a loan deal until the end of the season. In his six-month loan spell in the Serie B, Pesce quickly regained his starting position and made 22 appearances for the club.

He returned to Catania on 1 July 2010 and remained with the club for the 2010-11 Serie A season. In June 2011 Ascoli bought back Pesce from Catania for €550. Ascoli also bought Gazzola outright for €500, and Falconieri for free.

=== Novara ===
On 15 July 2011, Novara announced having signed Pesce from Ascoli for their Serie A comeback campaign, for €150,000, in a three-year contract. Novara also signed Achille Coser on the same day for free, as well as Luigi Giorgi for €1.6 million on 16 July. On 7 August 2013 Pesce signed a new 4-year contract with Novara.

=== Cremonese ===
In January 2016, he moved to Cremonese.

=== Lumezzane ===
On 28 July 2020 he signed with Lumezzane. With Lumezzane, he won two promotions, first from Eccellenza to Serie D and then back to Serie C just a year later.

In May 2024, after four seasons with Lumezzane, Pesce announced his retirement at nearly 42 years of age but agreed to stay at Lumezzane as the club's new sporting director.
