= Maxi López =

Argentine footballer (born 1984)

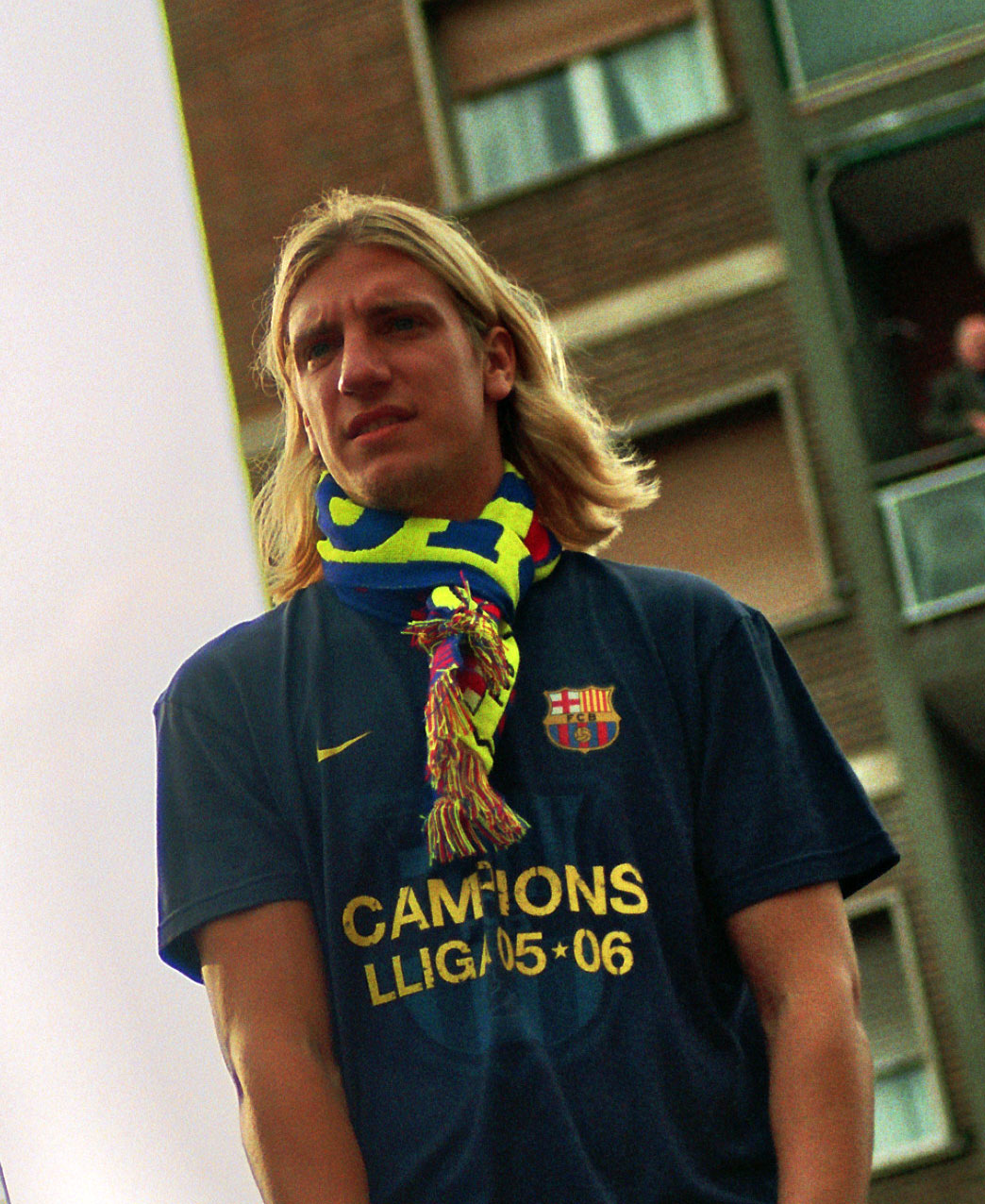
- López with Barcelona in 2006

Personal information
- Full name: Maximiliano Gastón López
- Date of birth: 3 April 1984 (age 42)
- Place of birth: Buenos Aires, Argentina
- Height: 1.89 m (6 ft 2 1/2 in)
- Position: Striker

Youth career
- 1997–2001: River Plate

Senior career*
Years	Team	Apps	(Gls)
2001–2004	River Plate	70	(16)
2005–2007	Barcelona	14	(2)
2006–2007	→ Mallorca (loan)	29	(3)
2007–2009	FC Moscow	22	(9)
2009	→ Grêmio (loan)	25	(12)
2010–2014	Catania	78	(23)
2012	→ Milan (loan)	8	(1)
2012–2013	→ Sampdoria (loan)	17	(4)
2014	→ Sampdoria (loan)	11	(1)
2014–2015	Chievo	13	(1)
2015–2017	Torino	60	(14)
2017–2018	Udinese	28	(2)
2018–2019	Vasco da Gama	32	(10)
2019–2020	Crotone	14	(1)
2020–2021	Sambenedettese	23	(3)
Total		430	(97)

International career
2001	Argentina U17	5	(3)
2001–2004	Argentina U20	29	(8)
- * Club domestic league appearances and goals

Maximiliano Gastón López (born 3 April 1984) is an Argentine former professional footballer who played as a striker. He holds both an Argentine and an Italian passport. He is known as El Rubio ("The Blonde"), and La Gallina de Oro ("The Golden Hen").

Formed at River Plate, he spent most of his career in Italy, making 215 Serie A appearances and scoring 46 goals for Catania, AC Milan, Sampdoria, Chievo, Torino and Udinese. He also played in Spain for Barcelona and Mallorca, winning the La Liga and UEFA Champions League double with the former in 2006, and for Grêmio and Vasco da Gama in the Campeonato Brasileiro Série A.

== Club career ==
=== River Plate ===
López began his career in 1997 with River Plate. On 19 August 2001, at age 17, he made his senior debut, against Talleres de Córdoba. That same season, he was officially promoted to the senior squad following five years with the youth program. With River Plate, he was a standout striker and the club won the Torneo Clausura in 2002, 2003 and 2004. With River Plate, he made 56 appearances, scoring 13 goals.

=== Barcelona ===
In January 2005, Barcelona signed López on a 4 1/2-year contract for €6.2 million following an injury to striker Henrik Larsson. On his UEFA Champions League debut on 23 February, he came on as a second-half substitute for Ludovic Giuly and within four minutes beat Chelsea defender William Gallas to score an equaliser with his first shot for the club, an eventual 2–1 first-leg win. His only other goal for the club came in a Copa del Rey tie against Zamora on 11 January 2006. López failed to break into the club's first team; in his two seasons in La Liga, he made just 14 league appearances.

=== Mallorca, Moscow and Grêmio ===
López transferred to Mallorca on loan for the 2006–07 season, with the deal not including a purchasing option. He scored 3 goals in 25 matches, and returned to Barcelona in the summer of 2007, only to be sold to FC Moscow on 16 August 2007 after a €2 million transfer fee was agreed by the clubs. With Moscow, López made 22 league appearances and scored 9 goals.

On 13 February 2009, Brazilian club Grêmio signed López on a season-long loan. He made his debut the following month in a game against Santa Cruz. His first goal for the club came against São José-PA on 18 March 2009. López scored four goals in the 2009 Copa Libertadores and the winner in the centenary Gre-Nal derby match.

=== Catania ===
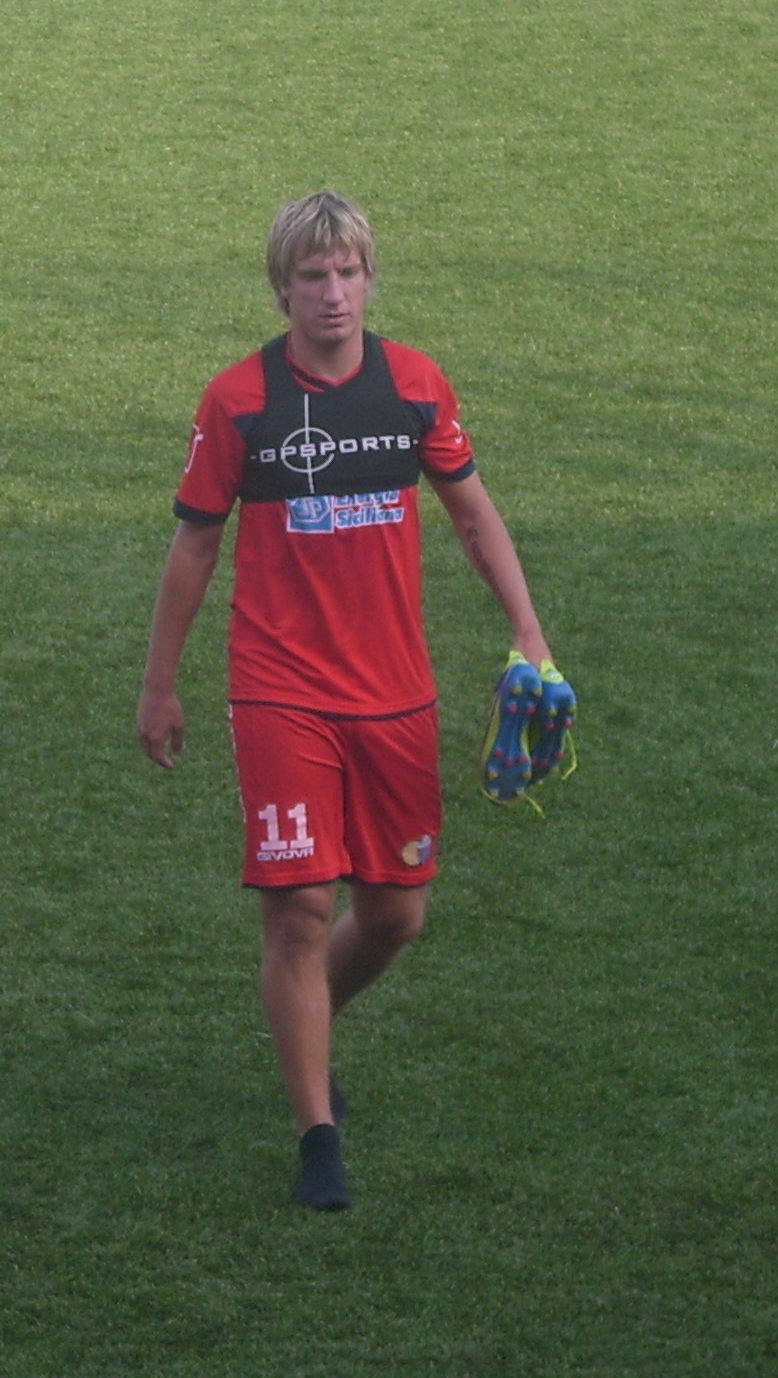
López with Catania in 2011

On 20 January 2010, López transferred to Catania for a €3 million transfer fee, signing a contract lasting until 30 June 2013. He made his Serie A debut on 31 January, [24] playing 55 minutes in the match against the Udinese. In the next match, away to Lazio (0–1), he scored his first goal and the match-winner for the Rossazzurri. On 3 April, he scored his first brace in the Italian top flight during the Sicilian derby against Palermo. He closed the season in double figures, scoring 11 goals in 17 appearances and contributed to the safety of the Etnei in Serie A.

The following season, López scored his first goal in a 2–0 home victory against Cesena on 22 September 2010. At the end of the season, he had scored 8 goals in 35 appearances, finishing 12th in the Serie A table with Catania.

In the 2011–12 season, López scored his first goal on 18 September 2011, converting a penalty against Cesena. On 18 December 2011, in the match won 2–0 by Catania against Palermo, he converted his second penalty of the season and was tearfully substituted by Gonzalo Bergessio for a possible farewell before the winter session of the transfer window.

==== Loan to AC Milan ====
On 27 January 2012, López was officially transferred to AC Milan in a €1.5 million loan move, with a buying option set at €8 million. He signed a contract with Milan until 30 June 2015 to receive €700,000 until the end of the 2011–12 season and €1.5 million per year for the following three seasons. He chose the number 21 shirt.

López scored his first goal as a Milan player on 11 February 2012 in an away game against Udinese, equalising for Milan before going on to assist Stephan El Shaarawy to score the game-winning goal. However, at the end of the season, he returned to Catania after Milan opted not to exercise their buying option.

==== Loan to Sampdoria ====
On 11 July, López joined Sampdoria on a season-long loan deal from Catania.

López returned to Catania from a loan spell for the duration of the 2013–14 season and on 28 January 2014, he rejoined Sampdoria on loan for the remainder of the Serie A campaign. He scored a winning goal in his first match back for Sampdoria against Genoa on 3 February 2014.

=== Chievo ===
On 30 June 2014, López signed a one-year deal with Chievo with an option to extend his contract for a further year after Catania relegation. He made his debut on the first day of the 2014–15 Serie A season, 30 August, against Juventus, playing the full 90 minutes of a 1–0 home loss. In his second match, on 14 September, he scored the only goal as Chievo defeated Napoli.

=== Torino ===
On 13 January 2015, López joined Torino, signing a six-month contract with an option for another year. He debuted the next day against Lazio in the second round of the Coppa Italia. On 18 January, he scored his first goal for Torino, against Cesena in a 3–2 Torino victory. On 19 February, he scored a brace during the UEFA Europa League round of 32 against Athletic Bilbao, therefore managing to score in five different leagues (Argentine, Spanish, Russian, Brazilian and Italian) and in all international competitions (Copa Libertadores, Copa Sudamericana, Champions League and Europa League). He scored again in the victorious return leg in Spain seven days later, then the 28th round of the league away at Parma. On 17 May, he scored his first brace for Torino in Serie A in the 2–0 victory over his former club Chievo.

After renewing for another year, on 24 November 2015 López signed a new contract with Torino lasting until 2018.

=== Vasco de Gama ===
On 14 July 2018, López joined Vasco da Gama, signing an eighteen-month contract with an option for another year. He debuted against São Paulo. On 27 August, he scored his first goal for Vasco against Chapecoense in a 3–1 Vasco victory and also had two assists, winning man of the match honors. After 14 matches he had great displays, with 7 goals and 6 assists, being considered the best Vasco player in the second semester and becoming the supporters favorite.

=== Return to Italy ===
On 23 August 2019, López return to Italy in Serie B club Crotone for free. He signed a one-year contract.

On 10 August 2020, he signed a one-year contract with Serie C club Sambenedettese.

== International career ==
López represented his birth nation of Argentina at under-15, under-17 and under-20 levels, also taking part to the 2003 South American Youth Championship. He was eligible for both Argentina and Italy, as he holds both citizenships and has never represented any national team at senior level. In July 2010, he explicitly stated he might accept a call-up from the Azzurri.

== International goals ==
=== Argentina U17 ===
No.	Date	Venue	Opponent	Score	Result	Competition
1.	15 September 2001	Couva, Trinidad and Tobago	Burkina Faso	2–2	2–2	2001 FIFA U-17 World Championship
2.	17 September 2001	Marabella, Trinidad & Tobago	Oman	1–0	3–0	2001 FIFA U-17 World Championship
3.	20 September 2001	Couva, Trinidad & Tobago	Spain	2–2	4–2	2001 FIFA U-17 World Championship

== Personal life ==
López was married to Argentine model Wanda Nara from 2008 to 2013. The couple have three sons, Valentino Gastón (born 25 January 2009 in Buenos Aires), Constantino (born 19 December 2010 in Catania) and Benedicto (born 20 February 2012 in Milan). Nara and López split after her affair with López's former Sampdoria teammate Mauro Icardi was exposed. López had previously been good friends with Icardi, inviting his countryman on vacations and opening his home to Icardi when he first moved to Italy. She and López began divorce proceedings in December 2013. Nara and Icardi subsequently married on 27 May 2014. During the April 2014 Serie A match between Sampdoria and Inter, López notably refused to shake Icardi's hand, leading the press to dub the game the "Wanda derby".

Since February 2014, he has been in a relationship with Swedish model Daniela Christiansson. On 26 May 2021, they announced that they had become engaged days before, on Christiansson's thirtieth birthday in San Benedetto del Tronto. On 26 September 2022, they announced that they were expecting a baby. Their daughter Elle was born on 31 March 2023 in London.

López's change of luck from being a somewhat criticised forward at River Plate to being signed by Barcelona made him an internet meme in his native Argentina. Satirical blogs were created lobbying for his inclusion in the Argentinian squad for the 2006 FIFA World Cup. After Argentina's elimination from the World Cup, without López in the 23-man squad, the nature of the meme changed to a series of reasons explaining his lack of time play on Barcelona with hyperbolic claims which closely resembled Chuck Norris Facts. In interviews, López has stated that he is "okay" with this unexpected following.

López and fashion industry businessman Paul Richardson led a consortium interested in buying English Championship club Birmingham City. They pulled out of any prospective deal in December 2022, citing a lack of agreement on revised terms.

López was criticzed for telling the streamer IShowSpeed that he would "beat his ass" for wearing Argentina's jersey for their round-of-16 clash against Switzerland in the 2026 FIFA World Cup. The streamer, a diehard Ronaldo fan, had become the subject of a meme stating that him wearing a team's jersey would "curse" them instead.

== Career statistics ==
=== Club ===
As of 20 May 2018.

Club	Season	League			National cup (Note: Includes Copa del Rey, Coppa Italia)		Continental		Other		Total	
Club	Season	Division	Apps	Goals	Apps	Goals	Apps	Goals	Apps	Goals	Apps	Goals
River Plate	2001–02	Primera División	17	1	—		2	0	—		19	1
River Plate	2002–03	Primera División	6	1	—		1	0	—		7	1
River Plate	2003–04	Primera División	17	6	—		8	1	—		25	7
River Plate	2004–05	Primera División	16	5	—		3	2	—		19	7
River Plate	Total		56	13	—		14	3	—		70	16
Barcelona	2004–05	La Liga	8	0	—		2 (Note: Appearance(s) in UEFA Champions League)	1	—		10	1
Barcelona	2005–06	La Liga	6	0	2	1	1	0	—		9	1
Barcelona	Total		14	0	2	1	3	1	—		19	2
Mallorca (loan)	2006–07	La Liga	29	3	2	2	—		—		31	5
FC Moscow	2007	Russian Premier League	9	6	—		—		—		9	6
FC Moscow	2008	Russian Premier League	13	3	—		1 (Note: Appearance in UEFA Cup)	0	—		14	3
FC Moscow	Total		22	9	—		1	0	—		23	9
Grêmio (loan)	2009	Série A	25	12	—		9 (Note: Appearances in Copa Libertadores)	4	7 (Note: Appearances in Campeonato Gaúcho)	1	41	17
Catania	2009–10	Serie A	17	11	—		—		—		17	11
Catania	2010–11	Serie A	35	8	2	2	—		—		37	10
Catania	2011–12	Serie A	14	3	2	2	—		—		16	5
Catania	2013–14	Serie A	12	1	1	0	—		—		13	1
Catania	Total		78	23	5	4	—		—		83	27
Milan (loan)	2011–12	Serie A	8	1	2	1	1	0	—		11	2
Sampdoria (loan)	2012–13	Serie A	17	4	1	1	—		—		18	5
Sampdoria (loan)	2013–14	Serie A	11	1	—		—		—		11	1
Sampdoria (loan)	Total		28	5	1	1	—		—		29	6
Chievo	2014–15	Serie A	13	1	1	0	—		—		14	1
Torino	2014–15	Serie A	18	8	1	0	4 (Note: Appearances in UEFA Europa League)	3	—		23	11
Torino	2015–16	Serie A	26	4	3	2	—		—		29	6
Torino	2016–17	Serie A	16	2	2	1	—		—		18	3
Torino	Total		60	14	6	3	4	3	—		70	20
Udinese	2017–18	Serie A	28	2	1	4	—		—		29	6
Career total			361	83	20	16	32	11	7	1	420	111

== Honours ==
River Plate

- Torneo Clausura: 2001–02, 2002–03, 2003–04

Barcelona

- UEFA Champions League: 2005–06
- La Liga: 2004–05, 2005–06
- Supercopa de España: 2005

Torino

- Eusébio Cup: 2016

Vasco da Gama

- Taça Guanabara: 2019

Argentina U20

- Pan American Games: 2003

Individual

- Coppa Italia top scorer: 2017–18 (4 goals)
