= John D'Amico =

John D'Amico may refer to:

- John D'Amico (ice hockey), ice hockey player and supervisor of officials
- John C. D'Amico, American politician from Illinois
- John D'Amico Jr., American politician from New Jersey
- Jackie D'Amico, New York mobster
