= Margarita D'Amico =

Venezuelan journalist

- Born: 1938
- Died: 12 October 2017 (aged 78–79)
- Education: Central University of Venezuela; University of Paris
- Occupations: Journalist, researcher, and professor
- Website: Margarita D´Amico

Margarita D'Amico (1938 – 12 October 2017) was a Venezuelan journalist, researcher, and professor who made a substantial impact on art criticism and cultural journalism in Venezuela.

== Career ==
D'Amico graduated with a Bachelor in Journalism and Arts from the Central University of Venezuela (UCV) in 1961 and with a postgraduate in Audiovisual Information in the University of Paris in 1964. She became a professor at the Social of Communication Faculty of the UCV.

D'Amico is the author of the book Lo Audiovisual en Expansión (Monte Ávila Editores, 1971). She also authored several columns published in the El Nacional newspaper, including Videosfera, Los novelistas invisibles, Sí y No, Espacios, La Nueva Música. In the newspaper El Universal D'Amico authored the column Vanguardia Hipersónica.

D'Amico created the television series Arte y Ciencia y Pioneros, broadcast on channels 5 and 8 of Venezolana de Televisión, as well as the radio program Vanguardia Hipersónica, on Radio Caracas Radio. She also organized several video workshops and festivals in Venezuela and abroad. To investigate new communication methods, D'Amico founded Proyecto Arte y Ciencia ("Art and Science Project"), starting with the pilot program Creando con los Polímeros.

She was a collaborator in the Comunicación del Centro Gumilla magazine and the researcher center Cultura Visual del Centro de Investigación y Formación Humanística (CIFH) of the Andrés Bello Catholic University (UCAB).

Until the end of her life, D'Amico explored subjects like the creation of images through new technologies, technological possibilities for expression, and other topics having to do with aesthetics and modern communication.

D'Amico published her historic archive, La bohemia hipermediática, through UCAB.
