= Andrea Catellani =

Italian footballer (born 1988)

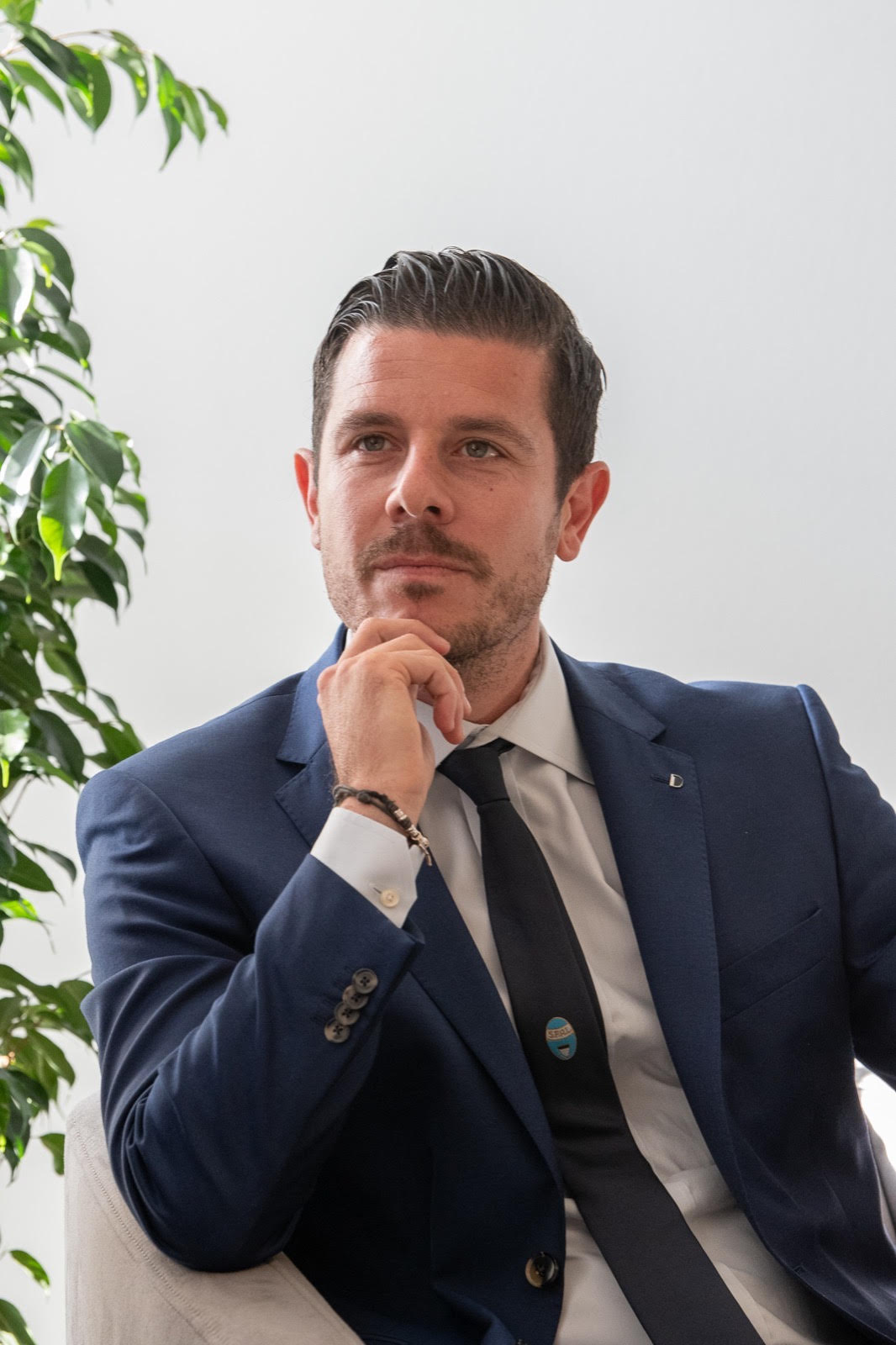
- Catellani in 2023

Personal information
- Date of birth: 26 May 1988 (age 38)
- Place of birth: Reggio Emilia, Italy
- Height: 1.77 m (5 ft 10 in)
- Positions: Winger; striker

Youth career
- –2005: Reggiana

Senior career*
| Years | Team | Apps | (Gls) |
| 2005–2008 | Reggiana | 77 | (15) |
| 2008–2013 | Catania | 21 | (1) |
| 2008–2010 | → Modena | 68 | (16) |
| 2010–2011 | → Sassuolo | 33 | (4) |
| 2012–2013 | → Sassuolo | 34 | (6) |
| 2013–2017 | Spezia | 100 | (24) |
| 2016–2017 | → Carpi (loan) | 14 | (3) |
| 2017 | Virtus Entella | 19 | (4) |
- * Club domestic league appearances and goals

Andrea Catellani (born 26 May 1988) is an Italian former professional footballer who played as a forward.

== Career ==
=== Catania ===
Catellani began his career in the youth ranks of Reggiana, before being signed in a co-ownership deal with Catania in June 2006. During the 2006–2007 Serie C1 season, Catellani scored 10 goals in just 15 league appearances; overall, his performances included 77 league appearances and 15 league goals for the Italian side. In the summer of 2008 Catania opted to sign the player back on a permanent basis.

He was officially brought back to Catania in July 2008 following the resolution of his co-ownership with Lega Pro side Reggiana. The transfer fee was undisclosed. After spending the summer training and taking part in first-team friendlies, the young striker was loaned out to Serie B outfit, Modena to gain experience. In his first Serie B season with Modena, Catellani made 25 league appearances, scoring 7 goals. He was included in the starting line-up on 18 occasions. After an impressive season for the young striker up north in Modena, it was believed that he would return to Catania and remain for the 2009–10 Serie A campaign, with the player also impressing during the pre-season. He was given the shirt number 11. However, on 29 August 2009 it was confirmed that the young striker would return to Modena for one more season of first team football. He made an additional 35 appearances for the Serie B club, scoring 9 goals in his second term.

In June 2010, the player again returned to Catania, upon the expiration of the loan deal. After training with the club's first team during the 2010 pre-season, and also taking part in pre-season friendlies, new head coach, Marco Giampaolo opted to send the player out on loan once more. Catellani officially was loaned out to Serie B side Sassuolo on 1 August 2010, joining former Catania teammate Mauro Minelli. During his loan at Sassuolo he scored just 4 goals in 33 Serie B appearances. On 30 June 2011, Catellani officially returned to Catania, and on 9 July 2011, Catellani was assigned the number 32 jersey. In his first full season with the Sicilian club, Catellani appeared most frequently as a substitute, scoring 1 Serie A goal in 21 league appearances. On 30 August 2012, Catellani was signed on a season-long loan deal by Sassuolo for the second time, after he had previously spent the 2010–11 Serie B campaign, also on loan.

=== Spezia ===
On 23 August 2013, he officially transferred to Spezia in a co-ownership deal.
