= Mario Paglialunga =

Argentine footballer (born 1988)

Personal information
- Full name: Mario Ángel Paglialunga
- Date of birth: 29 October 1988 (age 38)
- Place of birth: Rosario, Argentina
- Height: 1.82 m (5 ft 11 1/2 in)
- Position: Defensive midfielder

Team information
- Current team: Central Córdoba

Youth career
- Rosario Central

Senior career*
Years	Team	Apps	(Gls)
2006–2011	Rosario Central	74	(4)
2011–2013	Catania	6	(1)
2013	→ Hércules (loan)	18	(1)
2013–2014	Zaragoza	25	(0)
2014–2015	Ponferradina	16	(0)
2015–2016	Tigre	11	(0)
2016	Olimpo	6	(0)
2017–	Central Córdoba	?	(?)
- * Club domestic league appearances and goals as of 2 January 2018

Mario Ángel Paglialunga (born 29 October 1988) is an Argentine footballer who plays for Central Córdoba as a defensive midfielder.

== Club career ==
=== Rosario Central ===
Born in Rosario, Argentina, Paglialunga began his professional career with Argentine club, Rosario Central, making his professional debut in 2006. Paglialunga scored his first goal in Argentine football in a 2–1 defeat by Velez Sarsfield on 10 May 2008. In his first full season with the club, the young midfielder made 19 league appearances scoring two goals. He eventually went on to make 35 additional appearances before attracting the interest of Calcio Catania in the summer of 2011.

=== Calcio Catania ===
Mario officially transferred to the Sicilian outfit on 28 July 2011, for an undisclosed transfer fee. He was one of 12 new players arriving at the Stadio Angelo Massimino ahead of the 2011-12 Serie A campaign, although he failed to make a single appearance with his new club during his first season. Paglialunga eventually made his Serie A debut on 30 November 2012 against A.C. Milan, and scored his first Serie A goal on 16 December 2012. The goal was the equalizer in a 3–1 home win against U.C. Sampdoria. After just 6 appearances for the Sicilian outfit during the first half of the 2012-13 Serie A season, Paglialunga was sent out on a six-month loan deal.

On 28 January 2013, Paglialunga officially transferred to Segunda División club, Hércules CF, on a temporary loan deal that expired on 30 June 2013.

=== Real Zaragoza ===
Following his loan deal with Hércules, Paglialunga returned to Catania before being sold to Real Zaragoza on a permanent transfer on 10 July 2013, in what is a quick-fire return to the Segunda División.
