= Raphael Martinho =

Brazilian footballer

Personal information
- Full name: Raphael Martinho Alves de Lima
- Date of birth: 15 April 1988 (age 38)
- Place of birth: Campo Grande, Brazil
- Height: 1.83 m (6 ft 0 in)
- Positions: Left winger; attacking midfielder

Youth career
- –2003: Atlético Paranaense
- 2003–2008: Paulista

Senior career*
Years	Team	Apps	(Gls)
2008–2010	Paulista	6	(0)
2008–2009	→ Votoraty (loan)	25	(4)
2010–2012	Catania	11	(0)
2011–2012	→ Cesena (loan)	18	(0)
2012–2014	Hellas Verona	50	(12)
2014–2015	Catania	20	(3)
2015–2016	Carpi	11	(0)
2016–2018	Bari	12	(0)
2018	Ascoli	9	(0)
2018–2019	Virtus Entella	5	(0)
2019	São Bento	10	(2)
2020	Manaus	0	(0)
2020	→ Portuguesa (loan)	1	(0)
- * Club domestic league appearances and goals as of 17:49, 18 July 2021 (UTC)

Raphael Martinho Alves de Lima (born 15 April 1988), commonly referred to as Raphael Martinho, is a Brazilian footballer, who plays as a winger.

== Club career ==
=== Paulista Futebol Clube ===
Martinho started his career within the youth ranks of Brazilian club SC BOTLEK, before an early-career transfer to Paulista. Since 2007 his registration rights were owned by a "football club" from Monte Alegre do Sul, and were originally loaned to Paulista. After a youth career with the São Paulo based club, the player was sent on loan in 2009 to Campeonato Paulista Série A3 side Votoraty from Monte Alegre. Following his loan spell with the club, he returned to Paulista in June 2009. Following his return to Paulista FC, still on loan from Monte Alegre FC, along with teammate, Rafael Serrano, Martinho finally made his debut for the club, and during the 2010 season, he made 6 first team appearances 2010 Campeonato Paulista. On 21 May 2010, the Brazilian midfielder would move to Sicilian giants, Calcio Catania of Italian Serie A was confirmed by Paulista. Martinho completed the deal in August after his European Union citizenship was confirmed.

=== Calcio Catania ===
On 21 May 2010, Raphael Martinho was officially announced to have joined Calcio Catania. In his first season with the club, Martinho was limited to just 11 league appearances, just 5 of which were starts.

==== Cesena loan ====
Due to his limited game time for the Sicilians, the club opted to loan the midfielder to newly promoted AC Cesena for the 2011–12 Serie A season.. With the Seahorses, Martinho appeared 18 times in the league, but was unable to help his club avoid relegation to Serie B, as Cesena finished 20th. Martinho returned to Catania on 30 June 2012.

=== Hellas Verona ===
On 19 July 2012, Catania sent Martinho on a season-long loan deal to Serie B club, Hellas Verona, who also obtained the option to a co-ownership deal upon the expiration of the loan deal. The move proved very successful for the Brazilian, as he featured in 30 league matches, scoring 10 league goals, helping the Bentegodi-based club finish second in the 2011–12 Serie B league table and gain promotion to Serie A for the first time since 2002. At the conclusion of the loan deal, Hellas Verona took up their option to purchase 50% of the player's registration rights ahead of their return to the pinnacle of Italian football.

On 28 July 2015, Catania announced the termination of his contract.

=== Carpi ===
Martinho joined Serie A side Carpi F.C. 1909 on 28 July 2015.

=== Virtus Entella ===
On 1 February 2019, he was released from his contract by Virtus Entella by mutual consent.

=== São Bento ===
On 1 April 2019, Martinho moved back to Brazil and joined Esporte Clube São Bento.
