= Andrea D'Amico (football agent) =

Italian football agent

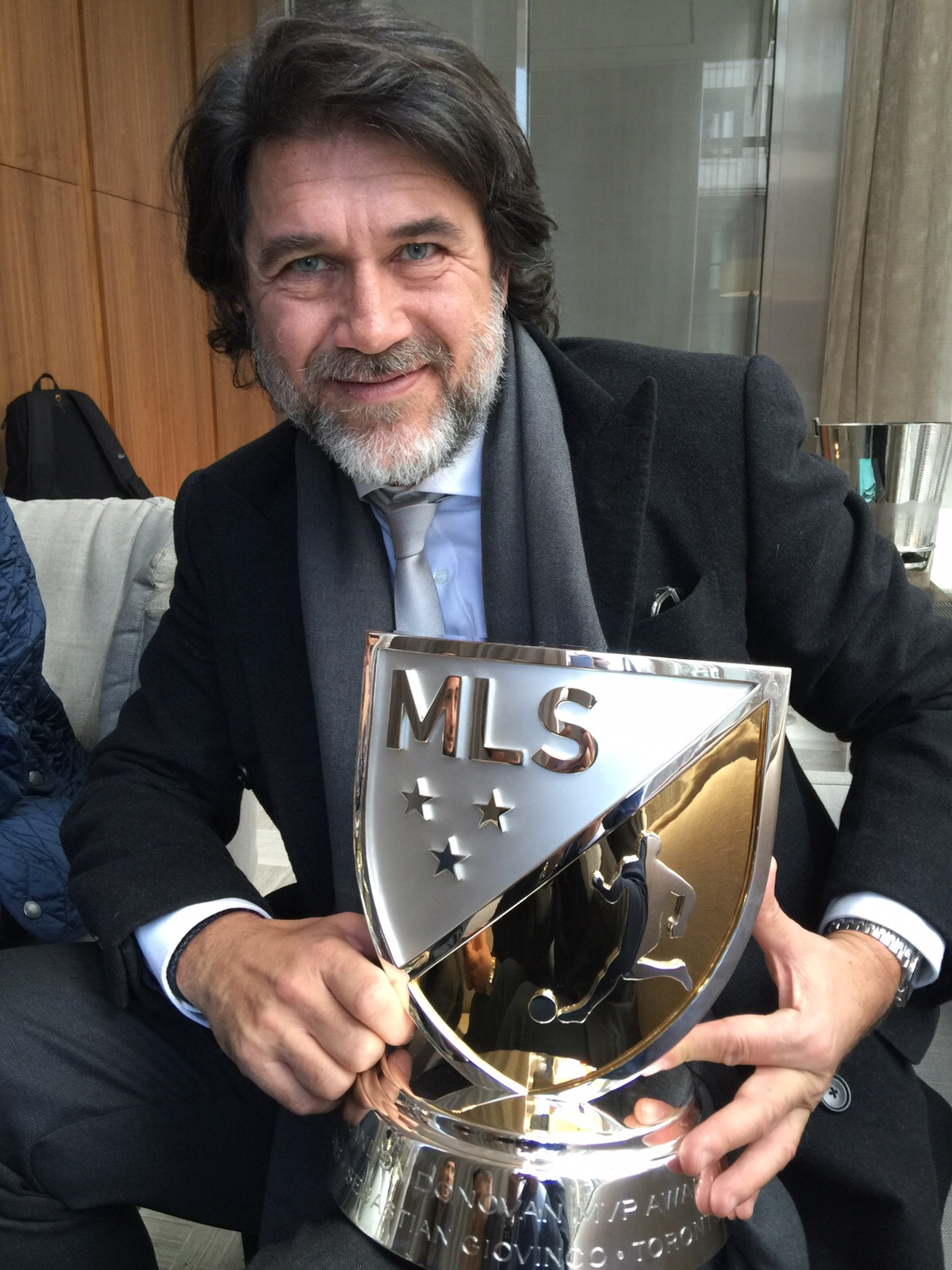
Andrea D'Amico during the giving of Giovinco's prize as the best MLS player

Andrea D'Amico is an Italian sports agent.

He was one of the youngest FIFA-regulated agents, served as secretary general of the Assoprocuratori, has been deputy vice president of the Assoagenti since 2012 and is a member of the Italian FIGC Commissione Agenti.

== Biography ==
As a teenager, D'Amico played several individual and team sports such as football, water polo, basketball and water skiing. Later, while studying at university, he worked as an instructor, teaching skiing and water skiing. His career as a sports agent began in July 1990. After graduating in law from the University of Modena in 1988, D'Amico studied for a master's degree in Marketing and Business Administration. During a casual meeting at the NH Milan Congress Centre, where the transfer market was being held, he met Oscar Damiani, who introduced him to Claudio Pasqualin, thus launching his career as a sports agent. In the beginning, he managed Pasqualin's players, then little by little began to manage his own, starting with the lower leagues.

== Career and awards ==
According to the Italian Autorità Garante della Concorrenza e del Mercato, as a sports agent in 2006, D'Amico ranked in fifth place for market share by volume (2.62%) and in second place for market share by value (8.6%). He was voted best agent for the 2014–15 football season, at the Italian Sport Awards. For 17 years, he was the agent for Gennaro Gattuso, who returned to Italy from Scotland, appearing for A.C. Milan some years later, and also in 1992 for Gianluigi Lentini, who initially was on loan from Turin rather than being transferred as a player to the Rossoneri team. He represented Alessandro Del Piero, securing and negotiating contracts and image, and brought Sebastian Giovinco first to Juventus and then to Toronto FC, where he was named Most Valuable Player in the 2015 Major League Soccer (MLS) season.

Together with his associates, D'Amico has worked on signings for numerous footballers, including Francesco Toldo, Dino Baggio, Salvatore Bocchetti, Domenico Criscito, Marco Donadel, Luca Rigoni, Marco Rigoni, Maxi López, Luca Antonini, Ignazio Abate, Vincenzo Iaquinta, Alberto Aquilani and Ishak Belfodil. In addition, he was instrumental in Fabio Cannavaro's transfer to Dubai-based Al-Ahli in 2010. D'Amico has been Marco Borriello's agent since January 2016. Following the opportunity to transfer to America to play in MLS, the former Carpi player was signed to Atalanta and is under contract until June 2016.

== Pasqualin D'Amico Partners ==
D'Amico and Pasqualin together founded Pasqualin D'Amico Partners in 1990. Originating from Pasqualin Management founded in 1996 by the solicitor, today the company includes Alessandro D'Amico, Andrea's brother, and Luca Pasqualin, the solicitor's son. The company manages the careers of football players and also provides all types of assistance to players, from sponsorship contracts to issues concerning taxation, as well as legal and financial advice. It also acts for them in respect of media relations.

Over the years, Pasqualin D'Amico Partners has been involved with some of the most significant businesses in the world of football. In addition, it has undertaken negotiations for Italian players to transfer to foreign teams, opening up the international market in Scotland, England and Spain. For example, it was instrumental in transferring Gianluca Vialli from Juventus to Chelsea, and transferring Sergio Porrini and Lorenzo Amoroso, from Fiorentina and Juventus respectively, to Rangers. Conversely, some of the great foreign football players have passed through the D'Amico and Pasqualin agency, such as Oliver Bierhoff, Thomas Helveg, Paolo Montero, Cristián Zapata, Joachim Björklund and Nuno Gomes. According to the Italian Autorità Garante della Concorrenza e del Mercato, in 2006 Pasqualin D'Amico Partners ranked in second place for market share by volume (3.52%) and by value (9.3%), behind Alessandro Moggi's GEA World.
