= Andrea D'Amico (footballer) =

Italian footballer (born 1989)

Personal information
- Full name: Francesco Andrea D'Amico
- Date of birth: 17 May 1989 (age 37)
- Place of birth: Catania, Sicily, Italy
- Height: 1.79 m (5 ft 10 in)
- Position: Midfielder

Team information
- Current team: SC Palazzolo

Youth career
- 2003–2009: Calcio Catania

Senior career*
Years	Team	Apps	(Gls)
2008–2010	Catania	3	(0)
2009	→ Reggiana (loan)	2	(0)
2010	→ Colligiana (loan)	9	(0)
2010–2011	→ Milazzo (loan)	25	(3)
2011–2012	→ Portogruaro (loan)	18	(2)
2012–2013	Milazzo	16	(6)
2013–2015	L'Aquila	15	(2)
2013–2014	→ Vigor Lamezia (loan)	26	(2)
2014–2015	→ Ischia Isolaverde (loan)	12	(0)
2015	→ Savona (loan)	9	(0)
2015–2019	Sicula Leonzio	45	(14)
2019–	SC Palazzolo		
- * Club domestic league appearances and goals as of 5 May 2019

Francesco Andrea D'Amico (born 17 May 1989) is an Italian football midfielder who currently plays for SC Palazzolo.

== Club career ==
=== Calcio Catania ===
D'Amico made his debut for the Sicilian club on 12 February 2009, in a Serie A encounter versus Inter Milan, after being promoted from the youth team by head coach, Walter Zenga. He was brought up to the first team following the sale of midfielder, Mark Edusei to Bari and the loan of midfielder Giuseppe Colucci to Chievo. He spent the rest of the season with the Sicilian giants, and was one of several very promising youth players utilized by Zenga. On 25 June 2009 it was confirmed that D'Amico, along with Nicolae Dică, would indeed be going out on loan. D'Amico moved, on loan, to Lega Pro Prima Divisione side Reggiana, but was limited to just 2 league appearances, mostly due to injury. He returned to Catania in January 2010, and was immediately loaned back out to Lega Pro side, Colligiana. During the second portion of the 2009–10 Lega Pro season, the player went on to make 9 appearances for the club. For the 2010–11 season, D'Amico was loaned to Lega Pro Seconda Divisione club Milazzo, where he was inserted into the first team. On 27 June 2011, D'Amico was sold on a co-ownership deal to Milazzo.

=== Palazzolo ===
On 7 September 2019 he joined SC Palazzolo.
