= 2019–20 Club Atlético Nueva Chicago season =

Association football season

Nueva Chicago
2019–20 season
- President: Germán Kent
- Manager: Gastón Esmerado
- Stadium: Estadio Nueva Chicago
- Top goalscorer: League: Leonardo Baima (1); Jonatan Fleita; All: Leonardo Baima (1); Jonatan Fleita

The 2019–20 season is Nueva Chicago's 5th consecutive season in the second division of Argentine football, Primera B Nacional.

The season generally covers the period from 1 July 2019 to 30 June 2020.

== Review ==
=== Pre-season ===
On 11 June, forward David Achucarro headed off to Colombian football with Cúcuta Deportivo. Nueva Chicago kicked off their off-season signings with three announcements, as Gonzalo Menéndez's arrival from Deportivo Santaní was followed by the captures of Federico Vasilchik (Ferro Carril Oeste) and Horacio Martínez (Atlanta). On the same day, Juan Cruz Monteagudo agreed a loan to Deportes Puerto Montt of Primera B de Chile. 23 June saw Bolivia's Oriente Petrolero sign Nicolás Franco, while Mirko Luna moved to Chilean Primera División side O'Higgins on loan on 28 June. 2018–19 loans ended in June. Santiago González was loaned from San Lorenzo on 30 June. On 1 July, Cata Díaz penned from Fuenlabrada while Christian Gómez announced his retirement.

Álvaro Pavón and César More arrived from San Jorge on 10 July. Paul Charpentier was loaned to Sacachispas on 10 July, while Adrián Scifo left a day later to Santamarina. Boca Juniors Reserves got the better of Nueva Chicago in 17 July friendlies in Ezeiza, as they followed a 0–0 draw with a three-goal victory. Valentín Viola came to Nueva Chicago on 18 July, following the left winger's departure from San Martín (T). Leonardo Baima signed on a free transfer from Chacarita Juniors on 19 July. 20 July saw Nueva Chicago go unbeaten in games with Sportivo Italiano of Primera C Metropolitana. Aldo Araujo's loan from Talleres was officialised on 22 July. Nueva held consecutive ties with Argentino on 24 July. An exhibition with Uruguay's Fénix was cancelled on 26 July.

30 July saw Nueva play Alvarado in a friendly fixture, with the newly-promoted Primera B Nacional team coming out on top following a draw and a win. Uruguayan attacking midfielder Matías Santos joined from Defensor Sporting on 31 July. Nueva's final opponents of pre-season were Almagro, who they beat in two matches at the Estadio Nueva Chicago. Emiliano Trovento joined on 3 August. Rodrigo Izco became Gastón Esmerado's twelfth reinforcement on 5 August, as he agreed terms from Comunicaciones. A season-long loan move for Mauricio Asenjo from Banfield was confirmed on 14 August, on the same date that Christian Gómez divulged a temporary halt to his retirement - resigning in order to make a farewell cameo on matchday five in the league against Atlanta.

=== August ===
Nueva's new campaign in Primera B Nacional got underway with a goalless draw at home to Deportivo Morón on 19 August. Another tie followed on matchday two, as they visited Temperley and drew 1–1 with Leonardo Baima scoring.

=== September ===
On 3 September, Nueva Chicago made it three ties on the bounce after a score draw with Platense.

== Squad ==
Squad No.	Nationality	Name	Position(s)	Date of birth (age)	Signed from
Goalkeepers
	Argentina	Augusto Bottini	GK	26 October 1998 (age 28)	Academy
	Argentina	Alan Minaglia	GK	16 July 1992 (age 34)	Academy
	Argentina	Agustín Silva	GK	28 June 1989 (age 37)	Sol de América
Defenders
	Argentina	Alan Brondino	DF	11 April 1998 (age 28)	Academy
	Argentina	Julián Cosi	DF	8 September 1998 (age 28)	Academy
	Argentina	Cata Díaz	CB	13 July 1979 (age 47)	Fuenlabrada
	Argentina	Jonatan Fleita	CB	20 January 1995 (age 31)	Unión Santa Fe (loan)
	Argentina	Adrián González	DF	6 July 1995 (age 31)	Academy
	Argentina	Rodrigo Izco	RB	17 October 1994 (age 32)	Comunicaciones
	Argentina	Enzo Lettieri	DF	19 July 1998 (age 28)	Academy
	Argentina	Alan Lorenzo	RB	27 July 1998 (age 28)	Academy
	Argentina	Diego Martínez	LB	19 January 1992 (age 34)	San Martín (T)
	Argentina	César More	LB	2 July 1989 (age 37)	San Jorge
	Argentina	Tomás Paschetta	DF	3 August 1993 (age 33)	Academy
Midfielders
	Argentina	Aldo Araujo	AM	3 January 1992 (age 34)	Talleres (loan)
	Argentina	Leonardo Baima	LM	5 October 1992 (age 34)	Chacarita Juniors
	Argentina	Favio Brizuela	MF	7 September 1997 (age 29)	Academy
	Argentina	Claudio Curima	RM	8 September 1997 (age 29)	Academy
	Argentina	Christian Gómez	AM	13 May 1989 (age 37)	Miami FC
	Argentina	Arnaldo González	AM	13 May 1989 (age 37)	Aldosivi
	Argentina	Axel Juárez	AM	27 July 1990 (age 36)	Defensa y Justicia
	Argentina	Lucas López	MF	30 January 1998 (age 28)	Academy
	Argentina	Facundo Mater	MF	23 July 1998 (age 28)	Academy
	Argentina	Gonzalo Menéndez	LM	16 December 1992 (age 33)	Deportivo Santaní
	Argentina	Gonzalo Miceli	DM	18 September 1997 (age 29)	Academy
	Argentina	Saúl Nelle	CM	24 November 1993 (age 32)	Independiente (loan)
	Argentina	Esteban Orfano	RM	13 January 1992 (age 34)	Aldosivi
	Argentina	Álvaro Pavón	CM	24 February 1993 (age 33)	San Jorge
	Uruguay	Matías Santos	AM	11 March 1994 (age 32)	Defensor Sporting
	Argentina	Leandro Teijo	DM	27 July 1991 (age 35)	Koper
	Argentina	Emiliano Trovento	MF	10 January 1995 (age 31)	Real Pilar
	Argentina	Alexis Vázquez	MF	23 September 1996 (age 30)	Academy
	Argentina	Gonzalo Vivas	MF	16 February 1993 (age 33)	Academy
Forwards
	Argentina	Mauricio Asenjo	CF	23 July 1994 (age 32)	Banfield (loan)
	Argentina	Matías Bazán	FW	20 January 1997 (age 29)	Academy
	Argentina	Facundo Carrillo	FW	26 February 1997 (age 29)	Academy
	Argentina	Gastón Espósito	FW	6 February 1998 (age 28)	Academy
	Argentina	Santiago González	CF	25 July 1999 (age 27)	San Lorenzo (loan)
	Argentina	Horacio Martínez	FW	24 April 1987 (age 39)	Atlanta
	Argentina	Juan Sánchez Sotelo	CF	2 October 1987 (age 39)	Temperley
	Argentina	Federico Vasilchik	CF	8 January 1992 (age 34)	Ferro Carril Oeste
	Argentina	Valentín Viola	LW	28 August 1991 (age 35)	San Martín (T)
Out on loan					Loaned to
	Argentina	Paul Charpentier	FW	1 May 2000 (age 26)	Sacachispas
	Argentina	Juan Cruz Monteagudo	DF	26 October 1995 (age 31)	Deportes Puerto Montt
	Argentina	Mirko Luna	MF	2001	O'Higgins

== Transfers ==
Domestic transfer windows:
3 July 2019 to 24 September 2019
20 January 2020 to 19 February 2020.

=== Transfers in ===
Date from	Position	Nationality	Name	From	Ref.
3 July 2019 (Note: Deal agreed on 20 June 2019)	LM	Argentina	Gonzalo Menéndez	Deportivo Santaní	
3 July 2019 (Note: Deal agreed on 20 June 2019)	CF	Argentina	Federico Vasilchik	Ferro Carril Oeste	
3 July 2019 (Note: Deal agreed on 20 June 2019)	FW	Argentina	Horacio Martínez	Atlanta	
3 July 2019 (Note: Deal agreed on 1 July 2019)	CB	Argentina	Cata Díaz	Fuenlabrada	
10 July 2019	CM	Argentina	Álvaro Pavón	San Jorge	
10 July 2019	LB	Argentina	César More	San Jorge	
18 July 2019	LW	Argentina	Valentín Viola	San Martín (T)	
19 July 2019	LM	Argentina	Leonardo Baima	Chacarita Juniors	
31 July 2019	AM	Uruguay	Matías Santos	Defensor Sporting	
3 August 2019	MF	Argentina	Emiliano Trovento	Real Pilar	
5 August 2019	RB	Argentina	Rodrigo Izco	Comunicaciones	
14 August 2019	AM	Argentina	Christian Gómez	Unattached	

=== Transfers out ===
Date from	Position	Nationality	Name	To	Ref.
1 July 2019	AM	Argentina	Christian Gómez	Retired	
2 July 2019 (Note: Deal agreed on 23 June 2019)	FW	Argentina	Nicolás Franco	Oriente Petrolero	
8 July 2019 (Note: Deal agreed on 11 June 2019)	FW	Argentina	David Achucarro	Cúcuta Deportivo	
11 July 2019	RB	Argentina	Adrián Scifo	Santamarina	

=== Loans in ===
Start date	Position	Nationality	Name	From	End date	Ref.
3 July 2019 (Note: Deal agreed on 30 June 2019)	CF	Argentina	Santiago González	San Lorenzo	30 June 2020	
3 July 2019 (Note: Deal agreed on 1 July 2019)	CM	Argentina	Saúl Nelle	Independiente	30 June 2020	
22 July 2019	AM	Argentina	Aldo Araujo	Talleres	30 June 2020	
14 August 2019	CF	Argentina	Mauricio Asenjo	Banfield	30 June 2020	

=== Loans out ===
Start date	Position	Nationality	Name	To	End date	Ref.
10 July 2019	FW	Argentina	Paul Charpentier	Sacachispas	30 June 2020	
23 July 2019 (Note: Deal agreed on 20 June 2019)	DF	Argentina	Juan Cruz Monteagudo	Deportes Puerto Montt	31 December 2019	
23 July 2019 (Note: Deal agreed on 28 June 2019)	MF	Argentina	Mirko Luna	O'Higgins	31 December 2019	

== Friendlies ==
=== Pre-season ===
An exhibition match with Almagro, set for 3 August 2019, was scheduled on 3 July. Argentino revealed a friendly with Nueva Chicago on 9 July. They'd also face Boca Juniors Reserves in Ezeiza and Sportivo Italiano in Buenos Aires. Nueva Chicago also agreed a friendly with Uruguayan club Fénix. Matches were also set with Alvarado and Almagro.

Win Draw Loss

17 July 2019 Friendly	Boca Juniors Reserves	0–0	Nueva Chicago	Ezeiza, Argentina
		Olé; 60 min. match		Stadium: Predio Entrenamiento Boca Juniors

17 July 2019 Friendly	Boca Juniors Reserves	3–0	Nueva Chicago	Ezeiza, Argentina
	Goal	Olé; 60 min. match		Stadium: Predio Entrenamiento Boca Juniors

20 July 2019 Friendly	Nueva Chicago	0–0	Sportivo Italiano	Buenos Aires, Argentina
09:00 GMT-3		Grupo La Provincia; 60 min. match		Stadium: Estadio Nueva Chicago

20 July 2019 Friendly	Nueva Chicago	1–0	Sportivo Italiano	Buenos Aires, Argentina
09:00 GMT-3	F. Brizuela	Grupo La Provincia; 60 min. match		Stadium: Estadio Nueva Chicago

24 July 2019 Friendly	Nueva Chicago	1–1	Argentino	Buenos Aires, Argentina
10:00 GMT-3	S. González	Perspectiva Sur; 70 min. match	B. Chávez	Stadium: Estadio Nueva Chicago

24 July 2019 Friendly	Nueva Chicago	0–0	Argentino	Buenos Aires, Argentina
		Perspectiva Sur; 70 min. match		Stadium: Estadio Nueva Chicago

27 July 2019 Friendly	Nueva Chicago	Cancelled	Fénix	Argentina

30 July 2019 Friendly	Alvarado	1–1	Nueva Chicago	Ezeiza, Argentina
	S. Giordana	La Capital MdP; 70 min. match	A. Araujo	Stadium: Complejo Deportivo de Ezeiza

30 July 2019 Friendly	Alvarado	2–1	Nueva Chicago	Ezeiza, Argentina
	D. Becker; R. Giacomini (pen.)	La Capital MdP; 70 min. match	F. Vasilchik	Stadium: Complejo Deportivo de Ezeiza

3 August 2019 Friendly	Nueva Chicago	1–0	Almagro	Buenos Aires, Argentina
	C. Díaz	Almagro; Grupo La Provincia		Stadium: Estadio Nueva Chicago

3 August 2019 Friendly	Nueva Chicago	2–1	Almagro	Buenos Aires, Argentina
	F. Brizuela; C. More	Almagro; Mundo Ascenso	N. Paparatto	Stadium: Estadio Nueva Chicago

== Competitions ==
=== Primera B Nacional ===
==== Results summary ====
Overall								Home						Away					
Pld	W	D	L	GF	GA	GD	Pts	W	D	L	GF	GA	GD	W	D	L	GF	GA	GD
3	0	3	0	2	2	0	3	0	2	0	1	1	0	0	1	0	1	1	0

Last updated: 4 September 2019.
Source: Soccerway

==== Matches ====
The fixtures for the 2019–20 league season were announced on 1 August 2019, with a new format of split zones being introduced. Nueva Chicago were drawn in Zone A.

Win Draw Loss

19 August 2019 1	Nueva Chicago	0–0	Deportivo Morón	Buenos Aires, Argentina
15:35 GMT-3		La Voz del Interior; Soccerway		Stadium: Estadio Nueva Chicago; Referee: Fabricio Llobet (Argentina)

24 August 2019 2	Temperley	1–1	Nueva Chicago	Buenos Aires, Argentina
13:05 GMT-3	L. Rinaldi 75'	InfoRegión; Soccerway	L. Baima 87'	Stadium: Estadio Alfredo Beranger; Referee: Ramiro López (Argentina)

3 September 2019 3	Nueva Chicago	1–1	Platense	Buenos Aires, Argentina
17:05 GMT-3	J. Fleita 69'	TyC Sports; Soccerway	G. Suso 57'	Stadium: Estadio Nueva Chicago; Referee: Pablo Dóvalo (Argentina)

8 September 2019 4	Independiente Rivadavia	–	Nueva Chicago	Mendoza, Argentina
17:30 GMT-3				Stadium: Estadio Bautista Gargantini

== Squad statistics ==
=== Appearances and goals ===
No.	Pos.	Nationality	Name	League		Cup		League Cup		Continental		Other		Total		Discipline		Ref
No.	Pos.	Nationality	Name	Apps	Goals	Apps	Goals	Apps	Goals	Apps	Goals	Apps	Goals	Apps	Goals	Yellow card	Red card	Ref
–	GK	Argentina	Augusto Bottini	0	0	—		—		—		0	0	0	0	0	0	
–	GK	Argentina	Alan Minaglia	0	0	—		—		—		0	0	0	0	0	0	
–	GK	Argentina	Agustín Silva	3	0	—		—		—		0	0	3	0	0	0	
–	DF	Argentina	Alan Brondino	0	0	—		—		—		0	0	0	0	0	0	
–	DF	Argentina	Julián Cosi	0	0	—		—		—		0	0	0	0	0	0	
–	CB	Argentina	Cata Díaz	3	0	—		—		—		0	0	3	0	2	0	
–	CB	Argentina	Jonatan Fleita	3	1	—		—		—		0	0	3	1	2	0	
–	DF	Argentina	Adrián González	0	0	—		—		—		0	0	0	0	0	0	
–	RB	Argentina	Rodrigo Izco	1	0	—		—		—		0	0	1	0	0	0	
–	DF	Argentina	Enzo Lettieri	0	0	—		—		—		0	0	0	0	0	0	
–	RB	Argentina	Alan Lorenzo	0	0	—		—		—		0	0	0	0	0	0	
–	LB	Argentina	Diego Martínez	3	0	—		—		—		0	0	3	0	0	0	
–	DF	Argentina	Juan Cruz Monteagudo	0	0	—		—		—		0	0	0	0	0	0	
–	LB	Argentina	César More	0	0	—		—		—		0	0	0	0	0	0	
–	DF	Argentina	Tomás Paschetta	0	0	—		—		—		0	0	0	0	0	0	
–	AM	Argentina	Aldo Araujo	1	0	—		—		—		0	0	1	0	0	0	
–	LM	Argentina	Leonardo Baima	1(2)	1	—		—		—		0	0	1(2)	1	0	0	
–	MF	Argentina	Favio Brizuela	2	0	—		—		—		0	0	2	0	0	0	
–	RM	Argentina	Claudio Curima	0	0	—		—		—		0	0	0	0	0	0	
–	AM	Argentina	Christian Gómez	0	0	—		—		—		0	0	0	0	0	0	
–	AM	Argentina	Arnaldo González	0	0	—		—		—		0	0	0	0	0	0	
–	AM	Argentina	Axel Juárez	0	0	—		—		—		0	0	0	0	0	0	
–	MF	Argentina	Lucas López	0	0	—		—		—		0	0	0	0	0	0	
–	MF	Argentina	Facundo Mater	1(2)	0	—		—		—		0	0	1(2)	0	2	0	
–	LM	Argentina	Gonzalo Menéndez	0	0	—		—		—		0	0	0	0	0	0	
–	DM	Argentina	Gonzalo Miceli	3	0	—		—		—		0	0	3	0	0	0	
–	CM	Argentina	Saúl Nelle	2	0	—		—		—		0	0	2	0	0	0	
–	RM	Argentina	Esteban Orfano	0	0	—		—		—		0	0	0	0	0	0	
–	CM	Argentina	Álvaro Pavón	1	0	—		—		—		0	0	1	0	1	0	
–	AM	Uruguay	Matías Santos	0(1)	0	—		—		—		0	0	0(1)	0	0	0	
–	DM	Argentina	Leandro Teijo	0	0	—		—		—		0	0	0	0	0	0	
–	MF	Argentina	Emiliano Trovento	0	0	—		—		—		0	0	0	0	0	0	
–	MF	Argentina	Alexis Vázquez	0	0	—		—		—		0	0	0	0	0	0	
–	MF	Argentina	Gonzalo Vivas	2	0	—		—		—		0	0	2	0	0	0	
–	CF	Argentina	Mauricio Asenjo	3	0	—		—		—		0	0	3	0	0	0	
–	FW	Argentina	Matías Bazán	0	0	—		—		—		0	0	0	0	0	0	
–	FW	Argentina	Facundo Carrillo	0	0	—		—		—		0	0	0	0	0	0	
–	FW	Argentina	Paul Charpentier	0	0	—		—		—		0	0	0	0	0	0	
–	FW	Argentina	Gastón Espósito	0	0	—		—		—		0	0	0	0	0	0	
–	MF	Argentina	Mirko Luna	0	0	—		—		—		0	0	0	0	0	0	
–	CF	Argentina	Santiago González	1(2)	0	—		—		—		0	0	1(2)	0	0	0	
–	FW	Argentina	Horacio Martínez	1(1)	0	—		—		—		0	0	1(1)	0	0	0	
–	CF	Argentina	Juan Sánchez Sotelo	0	0	—		—		—		0	0	0	0	0	0	
–	CF	Argentina	Federico Vasilchik	1	0	—		—		—		0	0	1	0	0	0	
–	LW	Argentina	Valentín Viola	2	0	—		—		—		0	0	2	0	0	0	
Own goals				—	0	—		—		—		—	0	—	0	—	—	—

Statistics accurate as of 4 September 2019.

=== Goalscorers ===
Rank	Pos	No.	Nat	Name	League	Cup	League Cup	Continental	Other	Total	Ref
1	LM	–	Argentina	Leonardo Baima	1	—	—	—	0	1	
1	CB	–	Argentina	Jonatan Fleita	1	—	—	—	0	1	
Own goals					0	—	—	—	0	0	
Totals					2	—	—	—	0	2	—
