= Marko Živkovic =

Croatian footballer

Marko Živković
Personal information
- Full name: Marko Živković
- Date of birth: 3 May 1999 (age 27)
- Place of birth: Zagreb, Croatia
- Position: Goalkeeper

Youth career
- 2007-2018: Dinamo Zagreb

Senior career*
Years	Team	Apps	(Gls)
2018-2021	F.C. Casertana	2	(0)
- * Club domestic league appearances and goals

Marko Živković (born 3 May 1999) is a Croatian footballer who most recently played as a goalkeeper for Casertana.

== Career ==
=== Dinamo Zagreb ===
Živković was Member of Dinamo Zagreb 11 Years and in their U-17 team and U-19 team.

=== Casertana ===
Živković made 2 appearances for Casertana in 2019–20 season in a 2–1 win against Bisceglie and 2–0 loss against Catanzaro.
