= Facundo Carrillo =

Argentine professional footballer

Personal information
- Full name: Facundo Nahuel Carrillo
- Date of birth: 26 February 1997 (age 29)
- Place of birth: Monte Grande, Argentina
- Position: Forward

Youth career
- Banfield

Senior career*
Years	Team	Apps	(Gls)
2017–2018	Nueva Chicago	3	(0)
- * Club domestic league appearances and goals

Facundo Nahuel Carrillo (born 26 February 1997) is an Argentine professional footballer who plays as a forward.

== Career ==
After a stint in the academy of Banfield, Carrillo started out his senior career with Nueva Chicago. Facundo Argüello moved the forward into the club's first-team during the 2017–18 Primera B Nacional, kicking off Carrillo's professional experience by selecting him on the bench for an encounter with Quilmes on 11 November 2017. Carrillo made his debut against Villa Dálmine later that month, prior to featuring in fixtures versus Gimnasia y Esgrima and Los Andes in December. He departed in 2018.

== Career statistics ==
As of 18 July 2020.

Appearances and goals by club, season and competition
Club	Season	League			Cup		Continental		Other		Total	
Club	Season	Division	Apps	Goals	Apps	Goals	Apps	Goals	Apps	Goals	Apps	Goals
Nueva Chicago	2017–18	Primera B Nacional	3	0	0	0	—		0	0	3	0
Career total			3	0	0	0	—		0	0	3	0
