= Ricardo Melogno =

Argentine spree killer

- Born: Ricardo Luis Melogno; 1961 or 1962 (age 63–64); Buenos Aires, Argentina
- Status: In psychiatric facility
- Other name: The Taxi Drivers Killer
- Conviction: Aggravated murder (x4)
- Penalty: Life imprisonment (in Buenos Aires Province); Indefinite commitment (Buenos Aires city)

Details
- Victims: 4
- Country: Argentina
- Target: Taxi drivers
- Date apprehended: 15 October 1982

Ricardo Luis Melogno (born 1961 or 1962), dubbed The Taxi Drivers Killer, is an Argentine spree killer responsible for the murders of four taxi drivers during a five-day rampage in September 1982 in Mataderos and Lomas del Mirador.

Deemed legally insane by a court in the city of Buenos Aires (Mataderos crimes), he was committed to a psychiatric penitentiary unit. However, the courts in Buenos Aires Province (Lomas del Mirador killing) found Melogno competent to stand trial and sentenced him to life imprisonment.

== Background and crimes ==
Little is known about Melogno's childhood or background other than he was born in Buenos Aires and did not have permanent residence when he was arrested. His mother was a religious fanatic woman who fuelled Melogno's fears for ghosts and the paranormal. Melogno sometimes lived with his father Antonio in Mataderos or with his older brother in La Paternal. Described as a shy and quiet young man, Melogno struggled with severe mental health problems, including schizophrenia and delusions, and had completed his military service in Villa Martelli shortly before the series of murders.

On 23 September 1982, Melogno armed himself with a .22 caliber pistol and decided that he would stop a taxi to kill the driver. In Mataderos, he boarded the car of Ángel Redondo, a 51-year-old married man who drove a Fiat 125. Melogno shot and killed Redondo during the trip and stayed with his body for about ten minutes while he smoked a cigarette, a ritual that would become part of his modus operandi. After killing Redondo, Melogno went to a restaurant and asked for French fries and milanesa with tomato sauce, another particularity of his MO.

That same day at night, Melogno took another taxi, also in Mataderos, and again a Fiat 125. The car was driven by 33-year-old Carlos Alberto Cauderano, whom Melogno shot and severely injured during the trip. When Melogno left and police found Cauderano, he was still alive but in a serious condition. The man died shortly after being taken to a hospital.

On 27 September 1982, a third killing in Mataderos brought the attention of the media, which suspected that there was a serial killer at large targeting taxi drivers. The victim was 56-year-old Spaniard Juan de la Santísima Trinidad Gálvez, who drove a Peugeot 504. Melogno shot Trinidad Gálvez in the head and went to a nearby restaurant where he had gone on every occasion after killing his victims.

While dining at the restaurant, Melogno recalled in a later interview in the 2010s that he felt that the silverware was attached or glued to his hands. He did not realize that he had his hands stained with Trinidad Gálvez's blood. Other taxi drivers were talking in the restaurant about the serial killings and no one noticed his blood-soaked hands.

In the 10 days that followed the last murder, police did not have any clue and the investigation was stuck. Detectives released an identikit of the attacker and asked for help to identify him but no tip came until 15 October 1982. That day, a young man went to the Palace of Justice of the Argentine Nation in Buenos Aires and requested to speak with the judge in charge of the serial killings case. The man said that his younger brother, 20-year-old Ricardo Melogno, was responsible for the murders. He added that he and his father had found a makeshift shrine in Melogno's bedroom with three identification cards on top; the IDs were those of the murdered taxi drivers in Mataderos.

== Arrest and trials ==
After the declaration of his older brother, police raided Melogno's older brother's apartment in La Paternal and arrested him. He quickly confessed to the three murders and, in addition, to a fourth killing (the first in the series) of another taxi driver in Lomas del Mirador. In admitting to this murder in Buenos Aires Province, Melogno explained that he did not have a motive for the crimes and that he did not know why he had killed those men.

Psychiatric evaluations differed by jurisdiction, with the City of Buenos Aires (CABA) finding that Melogno was not fit to stand trial and ordered his commitment to a psychiatric unit of the Federal Penitentiary Service. Melogno was first housed in a Villa Devoto psychiatric prison facility and later in Unit 20 of the Hospital Borda.

However, Buenos Aires Province psychiatric evaluators, who interviewed Melogno due to his first killing, found him competent to understand the consequences of his actions and therefore fit to face a trial. Melogno was subsequently convicted of aggravated murder in the province, and sentenced to life imprisonment.

== Incarceration and aftermath ==
The CABA justice system and that of the province never reached an agreement on what to do with Melogno, and he spent many years in the psychiatric unit of different prison facilities. He served his last five years in the penitentiary system at the Ezeiza Federal Complex in Ezeiza, Buenos Aires. In 2016, Melogno was given release from the prison system and sent to a private mental clinic, where he is expected to remain for the rest of his life.

Argentine writer Carlos Busqued interviewed Melogno for more than 90 hours during his stay at the psychiatric unit of Ezeiza. Melogno argued that his "main problem" to be granted parole was that he was never able to explain a motive behind his actions. He added that he did not hate taxi drivers or had any problem with them, stating that if he had killed for a motive like money or even pleasure, he could have been freed. Melogno also explained the shrine found by his father and brother, saying that he had kept it to "scare away" the taxi drivers' spirits.

Busqued wrote a book about Melogno, where he told how "normal" and coherent Melogno spoke to him, and that his case had puzzled investigators in Argentina, where unusual crimes (with no clear motive) are not as common as in other places.

== Victims ==
#	Name	Age	Date of murder	Place
1	Surname "T."	?	early September 1982	Lomas del Mirador
2	Ángel Redondo	51	23 September 1982	Mataderos
3	Carlos Alberto Cauderano	33	23 September 1982	Mataderos
4	Juan de la Santísima Trinidad Gálvez	56	27 September 1982	Mataderos
