= Adrián González (disambiguation) =

Adrián González (born 1982) is an American baseball first baseman.

Adrian Gonzalez or Adrián González may also refer to:

== Sports ==
- Adrián González (cyclist) (born 1992), Spanish cyclist
- Adrián González (footballer, born 1976), Argentine footballer
- Adrián González (footballer, born 1988), Spanish footballer
- Adrián González (football manager, born 1989), Spanish football manager
- Adrián González (footballer, born 1995), Argentine footballer
- Adrián González (footballer, born 2003), Mexican footballer

== Others ==
- Adrián González Costa (born 1983), Puerto Rican lawyer and politician
- Adrian Gonzalez (kidnapper) (born 2000), American kidnapper
- Adrián Luis González (born 1939), Mexican potter
- Adrian Gonzalez, American police officer; see Uvalde school shooting

== See also ==
- Adrian Gonzales (1937–1998), Filipino comics artist
