= Lettieri (surname) =

Lettieri is an Italian surname. Notable people with the surname include:

- Al Lettieri (1928–1975), American actor
- Dave Lettieri (born 1964), American cyclist
- Enzo Lettieri (born 1998), Argentine footballer
- Gabriel Lettieri (born 1975), Argentine footballer
- Gino Lettieri (born 1966), Italian football manager
- Mark Lettieri (born c. 1984), American guitarist
- Paola Lettieri, British-Italian chemical engineer
- Tino Lettieri (born 1957), Canadian international footballer
- Vinni Lettieri (born 1995), American ice hockey player
