= Juan Cruz Monteagudo =

Argentine footballer

Personal information
- Date of birth: 26 October 1995 (age 31)
- Place of birth: San Martín, Argentina
- Height: 1.92 m (6 ft 4 in)
- Position: Defender

Team information
- Current team: Defensores

Senior career*
Years	Team	Apps	(Gls)
2015–2019	Nueva Chicago	59	(2)
2019	→ Deportes Puerto Montt (loan)	13	(1)
2021–2022	Catania	32	(0)
2022–2023	Viterbese	29	(1)
2023–2024	Virtus Francavilla	33	(0)
2024–2026	Nacional	37	(2)
2026–	Defensores	1	(0)
- * Club domestic league appearances and goals as of 17:44, 25 April 2026 (UTC)

Juan Cruz Monteagudo (born 26 October 1995) is an Argentine professional footballer who plays as a defender for Defensores de Belgrano.

== Career ==
Nueva Chicago was Monteagudo's first club. He became a senior member of their first-team during the 2015 Primera División campaign, though didn't appear in a matchday squad as the club was relegated to Primera B Nacional. He made his bow versus Independiente Rivadavia on 5 March 2016, prior to scoring his opening goal in April against Villa Dálmine in a 6–4 victory. Monteagudo featured nine times in 2016, the last appearance coming in a defeat to Crucero del Norte which he left after eighty-eight minutes via a straight red card. Forty-nine appearances occurred in the next three campaigns for the Mataderos outfit, along with one further goal.

June 2019 saw Monteagudo agree an eighteen-month loan deal with Deportes Puerto Montt, effective with the Chilean transfer window's opening on 23 July.

He then joined Catania of Italian Serie C in 2021. On 9 April 2022, he was released together with all of his Catania teammates following the club's exclusion from Italian football due to its inability to overcome a number of financial issues.

On 25 July 2022, Monteagudo signed with Serie C club Viterbese.

On 20 July 2023, Monteagudo moved to Virtus Francavilla.

== Career statistics ==
As of 20 June 2019.

Appearances and goals by club, season and competition
Club	Season	League			Cup		League Cup		Continental		Other		Total	
Club	Season	Division	Apps	Goals	Apps	Goals	Apps	Goals	Apps	Goals	Apps	Goals	Apps	Goals
Nueva Chicago	2015	Primera División	0	0	0	0	—		—		0	0	0	0
Nueva Chicago	2016	Primera B Nacional	9	1	0	0	—		—		0	0	9	1
Nueva Chicago	2016–17	Primera B Nacional	16	0	2	0	—		—		0	0	18	0
Nueva Chicago	2017–18	Primera B Nacional	23	0	0	0	—		—		0	0	23	0
Nueva Chicago	2018–19	Primera B Nacional	8	1	0	0	—		—		0	0	8	1
Career total			56	2	2	0	—		—		0	0	58	2
