= Favio Brizuela =

Argentine professional footballer

Personal information
- Date of birth: 7 September 1997 (age 29)
- Place of birth: Argentina
- Height: 1.69 m (5 ft 7 in)
- Position: Midfielder

Team information
- Current team: Nueva Chicago

Senior career*
Years	Team	Apps	(Gls)
2017–	Nueva Chicago	13	(1)
- * Club domestic league appearances and goals as of 19:14, 10 December 2020 (UTC)

Favio Brizuela (born 7 September 1997) is an Argentine professional footballer who plays as a midfielder for Nueva Chicago.

== Career ==
Brizuela started out in Nueva Chicago's ranks. He was selected off the bench for his debut on 23 July 2017 for a Primera B Nacional match with Chacarita Juniors by manager Facundo Argüello, who then picked him to start a loss to San Martín one week later. Brizuela made two appearances in the 2016–17 season, which was followed by six more in 2017–18 as he also scored for the first time versus San Martín on 3 March 2018.

== Career statistics ==
As of 24 February 2019.

Appearances and goals by club, season and competition
Club	Season	League			Cup		Continental		Other		Total	
Club	Season	Division	Apps	Goals	Apps	Goals	Apps	Goals	Apps	Goals	Apps	Goals
Nueva Chicago	2016–17	Primera B Nacional	2	0	0	0	—		0	0	2	0
Nueva Chicago	2017–18	Primera B Nacional	6	1	0	0	—		0	0	6	1
Nueva Chicago	2018–19	Primera B Nacional	0	0	0	0	—		0	0	0	0
Career total			8	1	0	0	—		0	0	8	1
