= Lucas López =

Lucas López may refer to:

- Lucas López (footballer, born 1994), Argentine defender
- Lucas López (footballer, born 1998), Argentine midfielder
