= Alan Minaglia =

Argentine footballer

Personal information
- Full name: Alan Lionel Minaglia
- Date of birth: 16 July 1992 (age 34)
- Place of birth: Buenos Aires, Argentina
- Height: 1.80 m (5 ft 11 in)
- Position: Goalkeeper

Senior career*
Years	Team	Apps	(Gls)
2015–2021	Nueva Chicago	48	(0)
2022	Sportivo Desamparados	8	(0)
2022	Botev Vratsa	0	(0)
- * Club domestic league appearances and goals as of 25 December 2022

Alan Lionel Minaglia (born 16 July 1992) is an Argentine professional footballer who plays as a goalkeeper.

== Career ==
Minaglia began his career in Mataderos with Nueva Chicago. Minaglia was unused on the bench while the club was participating in the 2015 Primera División, but went on to make his professional bow in Primera B Nacional, after relegation, on 16 April 2016 versus Guillermo Brown. That was one of three appearances in 2016, with the final one coming in a 6–4 victory over Villa Dálmine. He featured fourteen further times across the next two campaigns. In July 2022 Minaglia joined Bulgarian club Botev Vratsa.

== Career statistics ==
As of 19 February 2019.

Appearances and goals by club, season and competition
Club	Season	League			Cup		Continental		Other		Total	
Club	Season	Division	Apps	Goals	Apps	Goals	Apps	Goals	Apps	Goals	Apps	Goals
Nueva Chicago	2015	Primera División	0	0	0	0	—		0	0	0	0
Nueva Chicago	2016	Primera B Nacional	3	0	0	0	—		0	0	3	0
Nueva Chicago	2016–17	Primera B Nacional	9	0	0	0	—		0	0	9	0
Nueva Chicago	2017–18	Primera B Nacional	5	0	0	0	—		0	0	5	0
Nueva Chicago	2018–19	Primera B Nacional	0	0	0	0	—		0	0	0	0
Career total			17	0	0	0	—		0	0	17	0
