= Facundo Argüello =

Facundo Argüello may refer to:

- Facundo Argüello (footballer) (born 1979), association football player
- Facundo Argüello (tennis) (born 1992), tennis player
