= Gonzalo Vivas =

Argentine footballer

Personal information
- Full name: Gonzalo Leonel Vivas
- Date of birth: 16 February 1993 (age 33)
- Place of birth: San Justo, Argentina
- Height: 1.67 m (5 ft 6 in)
- Position: Midfielder

Team information
- Current team: Temperley

Senior career*
Years	Team	Apps	(Gls)
2013–2020	Nueva Chicago	105	(2)
2020–	Temperley	0	(0)
- * Club domestic league appearances and goals as of 14:14, 1 September 2020 (UTC)

Gonzalo Leonel Vivas (born 16 February 1993) is an Argentine professional footballer who plays as a midfielder for Temperley.

== Career ==
Vivas began his career with Nueva Chicago. Despite being on the substitutes bench for a 2012–13 Primera B Nacional fixture with Huracán, Vivas didn't make his professional bow until August 2015 when he played fifteen minutes of a 0–1 win against Crucero del Norte in the Primera División; after promotion in 2014. He participated in further matches versus Lanús, River Plate and Independiente as Nueva Chicago were relegated back to tier two. Vivas scored for the first time in April 2017 against Brown. In August 2020, after over one hundred appearances for Nueva, Vivas was signed by Temperley.

== Career statistics ==
As of 1 September 2020.

Appearances and goals by club, season and competition
Club	Season	League			Cup		Continental		Other		Total	
Club	Season	Division	Apps	Goals	Apps	Goals	Apps	Goals	Apps	Goals	Apps	Goals
Nueva Chicago	2012–13	Primera B Nacional	0	0	0	0	—		0	0	0	0
Nueva Chicago	2013–14	Primera B Nacional	0	0	0	0	—		0	0	0	0
Nueva Chicago	2014	Primera B Nacional	0	0	0	0	—		0	0	0	0
Nueva Chicago	2015	Primera División	4	0	0	0	—		0	0	4	0
Nueva Chicago	2016	Primera B Nacional	13	0	0	0	—		0	0	13	0
Nueva Chicago	2016–17	Primera B Nacional	36	1	2	0	—		0	0	38	1
Nueva Chicago	2017–18	Primera B Nacional	12	0	0	0	—		0	0	12	0
Nueva Chicago	2018–19	Primera B Nacional	22	1	0	0	—		0	0	22	1
Nueva Chicago	2019–20	Primera B Nacional	18	0	0	0	—		0	0	18	0
Nueva Chicago	Total		105	2	2	0	—		0	0	107	2
Temperley	2020–21	Primera B Nacional	0	0	0	0	—		0	0	0	0
Career total			105	2	2	0	—		0	0	107	2
