= Tomás Paschetta =

Argentine footballer

Personal information
- Full name: Tomás Agustín Paschetta
- Date of birth: 3 August 1993 (age 33)
- Place of birth: Carmen de Areco, Argentina
- Height: 1.87 m (6 ft 2 in)
- Position: Centre-back

Team information
- Current team: Sant Julià
- Number: 30

Youth career
- Defensores de Belgrano

Senior career*
Years	Team	Apps	(Gls)
2015–2018	Nueva Chicago	38	(2)
2019–2020	Fénix de Pilar	5	(0)
2021	Lanusei	0	(0)
2021	Siracusa		
2022–	Sant Julià	8	(1)
- * Club domestic league appearances and goals as of 18:19, 12 July 2022 (UTC)

Tomás Agustín Paschetta (born 3 August 1993) is an Argentine professional footballer who plays as a centre-back for UE Sant Julià.

== Career ==
Before playing at senior level for Nueva Chicago, Paschetta spent time in the youth of Defensores de Belgrano. In 2015, Nueva Chicago selected the defender on the substitutes bench for a Primera División fixture but he didn't come on in a goalless draw with Colón; that came in a season which concluded with relegation to Primera B Nacional. Paschetta subsequently made twelve appearances in the 2016 campaign, whilst also netting goals against Central Córdoba and Instituto as they finished seventh.

In July 2019, Paschetta moved to Primera B Metropolitana side Fénix de Pilar. After a year at the club, he moved abroad and joined Italian Serie D club Lanusei. However, without making his debut for the team, he left and signed with fellow Italian club Siracusa on 10 September 2021. He left the team at the end of 2021. In January 2022, Paschetta moved to Andorran club UE Sant Julià.

== Career statistics ==
As of 24 February 2019.

Appearances and goals by club, season and competition
Club	Season	League			Cup		Continental		Other		Total	
Club	Season	Division	Apps	Goals	Apps	Goals	Apps	Goals	Apps	Goals	Apps	Goals
Nueva Chicago	2015	Primera División	0	0	0	0	—		0	0	0	0
Nueva Chicago	2016	Primera B Nacional	12	2	0	0	—		0	0	12	2
Nueva Chicago	2016–17	Primera B Nacional	26	0	1	0	—		0	0	27	0
Nueva Chicago	2017–18	Primera B Nacional	0	0	0	0	—		0	0	0	0
Nueva Chicago	2018–19	Primera B Nacional	0	0	0	0	—		0	0	0	0
Career total			38	2	1	0	—		0	0	39	2
