= Aldo Araujo =

Argentine footballer

Personal information
- Full name: Aldo Andrés Araujo
- Date of birth: 3 January 1992 (age 34)
- Place of birth: Corrientes, Argentina
- Height: 1.65 m (5 ft 5 in)
- Position: Midfielder

Team information
- Current team: Olimpo

Senior career*
Years	Team	Apps	(Gls)
2012–2014	Textil Mandiyú	57	(11)
2015–2022	Talleres	59	(5)
2019–2020	→ Nueva Chicago (loan)	10	(2)
2020–2021	→ Olimpo (loan)	25	(4)
2022	→ Sarmiento (R) (loan)	23	(0)
2023–	Olimpo	4	(0)
- * Club domestic league appearances and goals as of 19:46, 7 June 2023 (UTC)

Aldo Andrés Araujo (born 3 January 1992) is an Argentine professional footballer who plays as a midfielder for Olimpo.

== Career ==
Textil Mandiyú became Araujo's first club in 2012. He remained with Textil Mandiyú until 2014, making fifty-eight appearances and scoring eleven goals; the last two coming during 2014 against Atlético Paraná on 5 October. In January 2015, Araujo joined Torneo Federal A side Talleres. He made his debut on 23 March in a fixture with 9 de Julio, whilst he scored his first Talleres goal in the following September versus Tiro Federal. Araujo won back-to-back promotions as Talleres rose from Torneo Federal A in 2015 to the Argentine Primera División in 2016–17. His first top-flight goal arrived against San Lorenzo on 26 January 2018.

== Career statistics ==
As of 5 August 2018.

Club statistics
Club	Season	League			Cup (Note: Includes the Copa Argentina)		League Cup		Continental		Other		Total	
Club	Season	Division	Apps	Goals	Apps	Goals	Apps	Goals	Apps	Goals	Apps	Goals	Apps	Goals
Talleres	2015	Torneo Federal A	23	3	0	0	—		—		0	0	23	3
Talleres	2016	Primera B Nacional	2	0	1	1	—		—		0	0	3	1
Talleres	2016–17	Primera División	13	0	0	0	—		—		0	0	13	0
Talleres	2017–18	Primera División	16	2	0	0	—		—		0	0	16	2
Talleres	2018–19	Primera División	0	0	1	0	—		—		0	0	1	0
Career total			54	5	2	1	—		—		0	0	56	6

== Honours ==
Talleres

- Torneo Federal A: 2015
- Primera B Nacional: 2016
