= Alan Brondino =

Argentine professional footballer

Personal information
- Date of birth: 11 April 1998 (age 28)
- Place of birth: Argentina
- Height: 1.91 m (6 ft 3 in)
- Position: Centre-back

Team information
- Current team: FADEP

Youth career
- 2007–2017: River Plate
- 2017: Nueva Chicago

Senior career*
Years	Team	Apps	(Gls)
2017–2020	Nueva Chicago	10	(0)
2020	Barracas Central	0	(0)
2021–	FADEP		
- * Club domestic league appearances and goals

Alan Brondino (born 11 April 1998) is an Argentine professional footballer who plays as a defender for Barracas Central.

== Career ==
Brondino began his career with Nueva Chicago. He was moved into their senior squad for the 2017–18 Primera B Nacional season, making his professional debut in a win over All Boys on 2 October 2017. Nine further appearances followed, all of which were starts, as Nueva Chicago finished twenty-third. Brondino was released in June 2020.

On 30 July 2020, Brondino signed with Barracas Central. In August 2021, Brondino joined FADEP (Fundación Amigos por el Deporte).

== Career statistics ==
As of 24 June 2020.

Appearances and goals by club, season and competition
Club	Season	League			Cup		Continental		Other		Total	
Club	Season	Division	Apps	Goals	Apps	Goals	Apps	Goals	Apps	Goals	Apps	Goals
Nueva Chicago	2017–18	Primera B Nacional	10	0	0	0	—		0	0	10	0
Nueva Chicago	2018–19	Primera B Nacional	0	0	0	0	—		0	0	0	0
Nueva Chicago	2019–20	Primera B Nacional	0	0	0	0	—		0	0	0	0
Career total			10	0	0	0	—		0	0	10	0
