= Julián Cosi =

Argentine footballer

Alex Julián Cosi
Personal information
- Full name: Alex Julián Cosi
- Date of birth: 8 September 1998 (age 28)
- Place of birth: Argentina
- Position: Defender

Team information
- Current team: Deportivo Madryn

Senior career*
Years	Team	Apps	(Gls)
2017–2023	Nueva Chicago	42	(0)
2023–2024	Villa San Carlos	27	(2)
2024–2025	San Telmo	37	(1)
2025–2026	Ferro Carril Oeste	27	(1)
2026–	Deportivo Madryn	7	(1)
- * Club domestic league appearances and goals as of 16:30, 27 April 2026 (UTC)

Alex Julián Cosi (born 8 September 1998) is an Argentine professional footballer who plays as a defender for Deportivo Madryn.

== Career ==
Cosi started his senior career in the ranks of Nueva Chicago. Having been an unused substitute once, versus San Martín, in the 2016–17 campaign, he made his bow in professional football in 2017–18 during a 3–0 defeat away to Aldosivi on 25 September 2017 with Cosi receiving a straight red card on sixty minutes. He didn't appear competitively until the following March against Deportivo Riestra, though went on to feature a further six times that season in Primera B Nacional.

== Career statistics ==
As of 22 February 2019.

Appearances and goals by club, season and competition
Club	Season	League			Cup		Continental		Other		Total	
Club	Season	Division	Apps	Goals	Apps	Goals	Apps	Goals	Apps	Goals	Apps	Goals
Nueva Chicago	2016–17	Primera B Nacional	0	0	0	0	—		0	0	0	0
Nueva Chicago	2017–18	Primera B Nacional	8	0	0	0	—		0	0	8	0
Nueva Chicago	2018–19	Primera B Nacional	0	0	0	0	—		0	0	0	0
Career total			8	0	0	0	—		0	0	8	0
