= Agustín Silva =

Argentine footballer

Personal information
- Full name: Agustín Silva
- Date of birth: 28 June 1989 (age 37)
- Place of birth: Bragado, Argentina
- Height: 1.91 m (6 ft 3 in)
- Position: Goalkeeper

Team information
- Current team: Macará
- Number: 22

Youth career
- Estudiantes LP

Senior career*
Years	Team	Apps	(Gls)
2009–2016	Estudiantes LP	35	(0)
2016–2018	Sol de América	48	(0)
2018–2019	Nueva Chicago	40	(0)
2020–	Macará	4	(0)
- * Club domestic league appearances and goals as of 22:54, 16 September 2019 (UTC)

Agustín Silva (born 28 June 1989) is an Argentine football goalkeeper currently playing for Macará in the Liga PRO Ecuador. He made his first appearance on 10 September 2011 against Tigre.
