= Alexis Vázquez =

Argentine footballer

Personal information
- Full name: Alexis Iván Vázquez
- Date of birth: 23 September 1996 (age 30)
- Place of birth: Merlo, Argentina
- Position: Midfielder

Team information
- Current team: Nueva Chicago

Senior career*
Years	Team	Apps	(Gls)
2016–	Nueva Chicago	40	(2)
- * Club domestic league appearances and goals as of 19:32, 10 December 2020 (UTC)

Alexis Iván Vázquez (born 23 September 1996) is an Argentine professional footballer who plays as a midfielder for Nueva Chicago.

== Career ==
Vázquez started out in the system of Nueva Chicago. A 2–1 loss at home to Estudiantes on 4 September 2016 saw Vázquez make his bow in professional football, with the midfielder going on to make thirty-six appearances across the 2016–17 and 2017–18 seasons in Primera B Nacional; he also netted two goals in that period, against Los Andes and Deportivo Morón respectively.

== Career statistics ==
As of 27 February 2019.

Appearances and goals by club, season and competition
Club	Season	League			Cup		Continental		Other		Total	
Club	Season	Division	Apps	Goals	Apps	Goals	Apps	Goals	Apps	Goals	Apps	Goals
Nueva Chicago	2016–17	Primera B Nacional	23	1	1	0	—		0	0	24	1
Nueva Chicago	2017–18	Primera B Nacional	13	1	0	0	—		0	0	13	1
Nueva Chicago	2018–19	Primera B Nacional	1	0	0	0	—		0	0	1	0
Career total			37	2	1	0	—		0	0	38	2
