= Jonatan Fleita =

Argentine footballer (born 1995)

Personal information
- Full name: Jonatan Brian David Fleita
- Date of birth: 20 January 1995 (age 31)
- Place of birth: Santa Fe, Argentina
- Height: 1.80 m (5 ft 11 in)
- Position: Centre-back

Team information
- Current team: Rincón

Youth career
- Unión Santa Fe

Senior career*
Years	Team	Apps	(Gls)
2015–2021	Unión Santa Fe	18	(0)
2018–2019	→ Nueva Chicago (loan)	28	(1)
2019–2021	→ Temperley (loan)	4	(0)
2021	→ Nueva Chicago (loan)	21	(0)
2022–2023	Atlético Rafaela	20	(0)
2023–2024	Guillermo Brown	22	(0)
2024–2025	Olimpo	31	(0)
2025–2026	Chaco For Ever	3	(0)
2026–	Rincón	0	(0)
- * Club domestic league appearances and goals as of 17:37, 21 July 2025 (UTC)

Jonatan Brian David Fleita (born 20 January 1995) is an Argentine footballer who plays for Torneo Federal A club Rincón.
