= Axel Juárez =

Argentine footballer

Personal information
- Full name: Axel Fernando Juárez
- Date of birth: 27 July 1990 (age 36)
- Place of birth: Bella Vista, Argentina
- Height: 1.77 m (5 ft 10 in)
- Position: Midfielder

Team information
- Current team: 12 de Octubre
- Number: 31

Youth career
- San Lorenzo

Senior career*
Years	Team	Apps	(Gls)
2009–2011	San Lorenzo	12	(0)
2011	→ Indep. Rivadavia (loan)	9	(0)
2012–2013	Mérida	32	(2)
2013–2016	Defensa y Justicia	46	(1)
2016–2017	Nueva Chicago	41	(1)
2017–2018	Apollon Smyrnis	21	(0)
2018–2020	Nueva Chicago	22	(0)
2020–2021	Guillermo Brown	33	(0)
2022–	12 de Octubre	3	(0)
- * Club domestic league appearances and goals as of 21:02, 24 July 2022 (UTC)

Axel Juárez (born 27 July 1990) is an Argentine footballer who plays for Paraguayan side 12 de Octubre as a midfielder.
He made his senior debut in Primera División for San Lorenzo on 18 May 2009, when he came on as a substitute in the first half against Gimnasia Jujuy.
