= Horacio Martínez (footballer) =

Argentine professional footballer

Personal information
- Full name: Horacio Raúl Martínez
- Date of birth: 24 April 1987 (age 39)
- Place of birth: Rosario, Argentina
- Height: 1.79 m (5 ft 10 in)
- Position: Forward

Team information
- Current team: San Telmo

Youth career
- Estudiantes

Senior career*
Years	Team	Apps	(Gls)
2009–2010	Grupo Universitario	28	(11)
2010–2011	Latina	25	(7)
2011–2014	Arezzo	76	(27)
2015	Mitre	0	(0)
2016	Sportivo Las Parejas	5	(3)
2016–2017	Cañuelas	31	(23)
2017–2018	Douglas Haig	25	(11)
2018–2019	Atlanta	31	(17)
2019–2021	Nueva Chicago	31	(3)
2022–	San Telmo	11	(1)
- * Club domestic league appearances and goals as of 20:12, 31 July 2022 (UTC)

Horacio Raúl Martínez (born 24 April 1987) is an Argentine professional footballer who plays as a forward for San Telmo.

== Career ==
Martínez left Estudiantes to play for Grupo Universitario, with the forward scoring eleven goals in twenty-eight Torneo Argentino B fixtures. In 2010, Martínez moved to Italian football with Latina. He scored seven goals in the 2010–11 Lega Pro Seconda Divisione as the club won promotion to Lega Pro Prima Divisione as Group C winners. Martínez subsequently left the club, joining Serie D side Arezzo. He remained for three seasons in the fourth tier, netting thirteen goals in his opening season before scoring eight and six in his remaining two; he also scored another six across cup and play-off football. Martínez departed Italy in 2014.

In 2015, Martínez joined Torneo Federal A's Mitre back in his homeland. After no appearances for the Santiago del Estero club, Martínez signed for Sportivo Las Parejas in January 2016. Having spent the 2016–17 campaign in Primera C Metropolitana with Cañuelas, where he netted twenty-three times in thirty-one fixtures, Douglas Haig became Martínez's seventh senior club on 22 August 2017. He scored two goals in his first two matches - versus Central Córdoba and Libertad respectively - on the way to eleven goals in 2017–18. In June 2018, Martínez joined Atlanta. He scored sixteen times after twenty-three games in tier three.

== Career statistics ==
As of 30 April 2019.

Appearances and goals by club, season and competition
Club	Season	League			Cup		League Cup		Continental		Other		Total	
Club	Season	Division	Apps	Goals	Apps	Goals	Apps	Goals	Apps	Goals	Apps	Goals	Apps	Goals
Grupo Universitario	2009–10	Torneo Argentino B	28	11	0	0	—		—		0	0	28	11
Latina	2010–11	Lega Pro Seconda Divisione	25	7	0	0	0	0	—		0	0	25	7
Arezzo	2011–12	Serie D	27	13	0	0	0	0	—		0	0	27	13
Arezzo	2012–13	Serie D	25	8	1	0	0	0	—		0	0	26	8
Arezzo	2013–14	Serie D	24	6	0	0	0	0	—		0	0	24	6
Arezzo	Total		76	27	1	0	0	0	—		0	0	77	27
Mitre	2015	Torneo Federal A	0	0	0	0	—		—		0	0	0	0
Sportivo Las Parejas	2016	Torneo Federal A	5	3	0	0	—		—		1 (Note: Appearance(s) in the Torneo Federal A play-offs)	0	6	3
Cañuelas	2016–17	Primera C Metropolitana	31	23	1	0	—		—		0	0	32	23
Douglas Haig	2017–18	Torneo Federal A	25	11	4	1	—		—		0	0	29	12
Atlanta	2018–19	Primera B Metropolitana	28	16	0	0	—		—		0	0	28	16
Career total			218	98	6	1	0	0	—		1	0	225	99
