= Rodrigo Izco =

Argentinian association football player

Personal information
- Full name: Rodrigo Ariel Izco
- Date of birth: 17 October 1994 (age 32)
- Place of birth: Caballito, Argentina
- Height: 1.80 m (5 ft 11 in)
- Position: Right back

Team information
- Current team: Tivoli

Youth career
- Huracán
- –2014: San Lorenzo

Senior career*
Years	Team	Apps	(Gls)
2014–2021	Comunicaciones	46	(0)
2016–2017	→ Ferro Carril Oeste (loan)	32	(0)
2017–2018	→ Estudiantes (loan)	10	(0)
2018–2019	→ Almagro (loan)	18	(0)
2019	→ Nueva Chicago (loan)	4	(0)
2021	Licata	14	(4)
2021–2022	Bisceglie	36	(1)
2022	Licata	9	(0)
2022–2023	Fasano	12	(0)
2023–2024	Castrovillari	6	(0)
2024–	Tivoli	15	(1)
- * Club domestic league appearances and goals as of 27 November 2024

Rodrigo Ariel Izco (born 17 October 1994) is an Argentine professional footballer who plays as a defender for Italian club Tivoli.

== Career ==
=== Club ===
Izco started his senior career with Comunicaciones, after youth spells with Huracán and San Lorenzo. He was selected for his senior debut in November 2013, with manager Jorge Vivaldo choosing him to start a Copa Argentina match with Deportivo Morón; his first appearance in Primera B Metropolitana arrived on 12 February 2014 against Almagro. Overall, Izco made forty-four appearances in his first seasons with Comunicaciones. Primera B Nacional side Ferro Carril Oeste completed the loan signing of Izco on 19 January 2016. He remained with them for the 2016 and 2016–17 campaigns, appearing thirty-two times.

August 2017 saw Izco join Estudiantes on loan. Ten appearances followed, with his final match coming in a 1–0 loss to former team Ferro Carril Oeste on 14 April 2018. Two months later, in June, Izco was loaned by fellow Primera B Nacional side Almagro.

On 25 August 2021, he joined Italian Serie D club Bisceglie.

=== International ===
Izco has previously been selected by the Argentina U23s for training, notably in preparation for the 2016 Sait Nagjee Trophy.

== Personal life ==
He is the younger brother of Mariano Julio Izco.

== Career statistics ==
As of 14 November 2018.

Club statistics
Club	Season	League			Cup (Note: Includes the Copa Argentina)		League Cup		Continental		Other		Total	
Club	Season	Division	Apps	Goals	Apps	Goals	Apps	Goals	Apps	Goals	Apps	Goals	Apps	Goals
Comunicaciones	2013–14	Primera B Metropolitana	8	0	1	0	—		—		0	0	9	0
Comunicaciones	2014	Primera B Metropolitana	9	0	1	0	—		—		0	0	10	0
Comunicaciones	2015	Primera B Metropolitana	24	0	1	0	—		—		0	0	25	0
Comunicaciones	2016	Primera B Metropolitana	0	0	0	0	—		—		0	0	0	0
Comunicaciones	2016–17	Primera B Metropolitana	0	0	0	0	—		—		0	0	0	0
Comunicaciones	2017–18	Primera B Metropolitana	0	0	0	0	—		—		0	0	0	0
Comunicaciones	2018–19	Primera B Metropolitana	0	0	0	0	—		—		0	0	0	0
Comunicaciones	Total		41	0	3	0	—		—		0	0	44	0
Ferro Carril Oeste (loan)	2016	Primera B Nacional	13	0	1	0	—		—		0	0	14	0
Ferro Carril Oeste (loan)	2016–17	Primera B Nacional	19	0	1	0	—		—		0	0	20	0
Ferro Carril Oeste (loan)	Total		32	0	2	0	—		—		0	0	34	0
Estudiantes (loan)	2017–18	Primera B Nacional	10	0	0	0	—		—		0	0	10	0
Almagro (loan)	2018–19	Primera B Nacional	1	0	1	0	—		—		0	0	2	0
Career total			84	0	6	0	—		—		0	0	90	0
