= Enzo Lettieri =

Argentine footballer

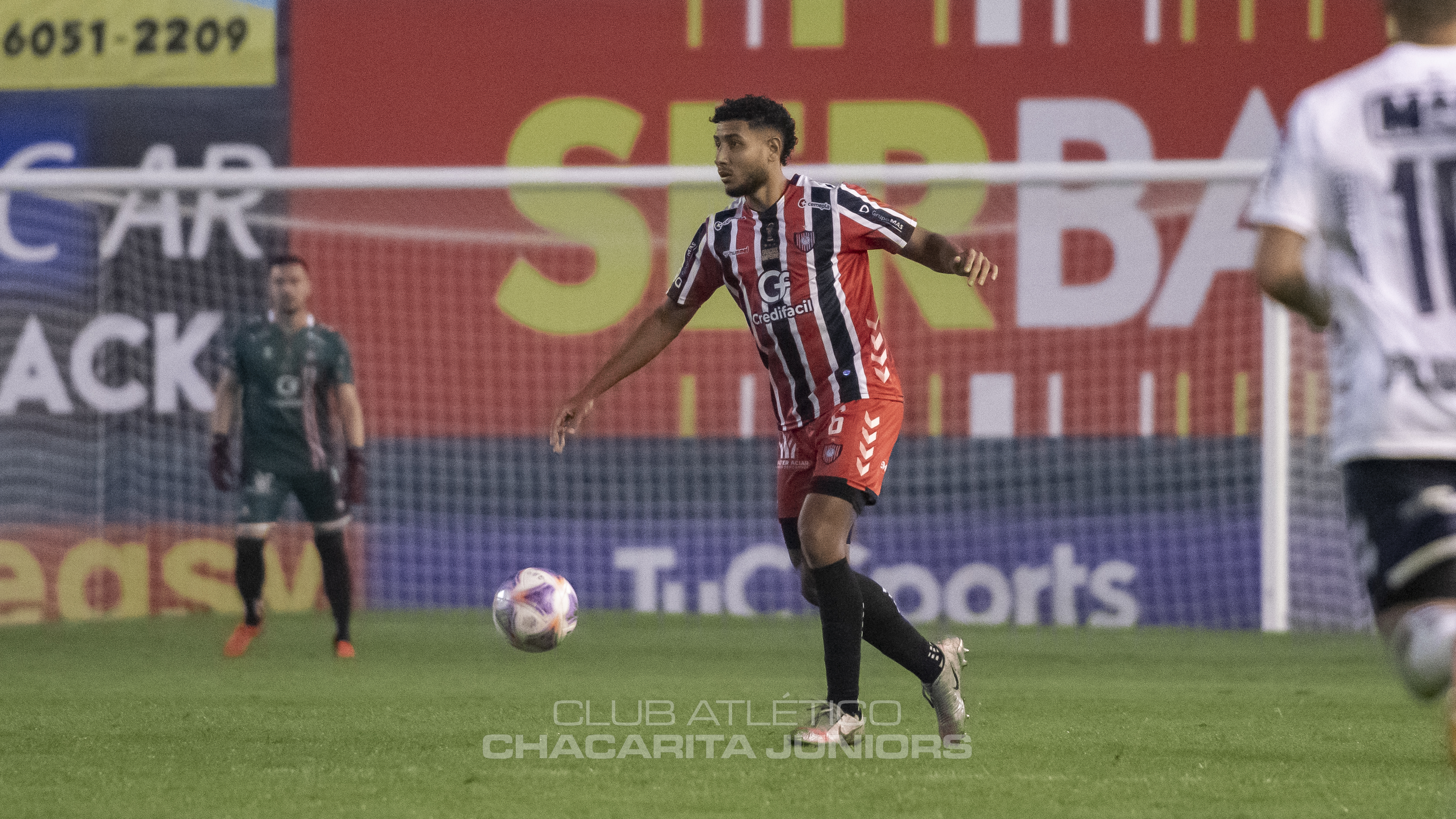

Personal information
- Full name: Enzo Adrián Lettieri
- Date of birth: 19 July 1998 (age 28)
- Place of birth: San Miguel del Monte, Argentina
- Height: 1.90 m (6 ft 3 in)
- Position: Defender

Team information
- Current team: Deportes Temuco
- Number: 5

Youth career
- 2006–2014: Independiente de Monte
- 2015–2017: Nueva Chicago

Senior career*
Years	Team	Apps	(Gls)
2017–2022	Nueva Chicago	53	(1)
2023	Chacarita Juniors	15	(0)
2024	Agropecuario	23	(1)
2025–	Deportes Temuco	0	(0)
- * Club domestic league appearances and goals as of 6 January 2025

Enzo Adrián Lettieri (born 19 July 1998) is an Argentine professional footballer who plays as a defender for Chilean club Deportes Temuco.

== Career ==
After a nine-year stint in the youth of Independiente de Monte, Lettieri joined Nueva Chicago's academy in 2015. A 2–0 defeat at the Estadio La Ciudadela to San Martín on 28 July 2017 in Primera B Nacional saw Lettieri make his professional debut, with the defender starting and finishing the fixture under manager Facundo Argüello. At the end of 2022, his contract with Nueva Chicago ended and he joined Club Atletico Chacarita Juniors until the end of 2023.

In 2025, Lettieri moved to Chile and joined Deportes Temuco.

== Career statistics ==
As of 24 February 2019.

Appearances and goals by club, season and competition
Club	Season	League			Cup		Continental		Other		Total	
Club	Season	Division	Apps	Goals	Apps	Goals	Apps	Goals	Apps	Goals	Apps	Goals
Nueva Chicago	2016–17	Primera B Nacional	1	0	0	0	—		0	0	1	0
Nueva Chicago	2017–18	Primera B Nacional	0	0	1	0	—		0	0	1	0
Nueva Chicago	2018–19	Primera B Nacional	0	0	0	0	—		0	0	0	0
Nueva Chicago	2019-20	Primera B Nacional	1	0	0	0	0	0	0	0	1	0
Nueva Chicago	2020-21	Primera B Nacional	5	0	0	0	0	0	0	0	5	0
Nueva Chicago	2021	Primera B Nacional	25	0	0	0	0	0	0	0	25	0
Nueva Chicago	2022	Primera B Nacional	21	1	0	0	0	0	0	0	21	1
Chacarita Juniors	2023	Primera Nacional	11	0	1	0	0	0	0	0	12	0
Career total			64	1	2	0	—		0	0	66	1
