= Tommaso Coletti =

Italian football manager

Personal information
- Date of birth: 9 May 1984 (age 42)
- Place of birth: Canosa di Puglia, Italy
- Height: 1.80 m (5 ft 11 in)
- Position: Midfielder

Team information
- Current team: Calcio Foggia 1920 (head coach)

Youth career
- Bari

Senior career*
Years	Team	Apps	(Gls)
2004–2005	Lavello	29	(1)
2005–2007	Martina Franca	52	(1)
2007–2009	Foggia	47	(4)
2009–2010	Pescara	43	(4)
2010–2011	Cosenza	13	(0)
2011	Andria BAT	13	(1)
2011	Foggia	3	(0)
2012	Pergocrema	13	(0)
2012–2013	Teramo	31	(6)
2013–2014	Brescia	30	(2)
2014–2015	Matera	38	(3)
2015–2018	Foggia	77	(4)
2018–2019	Triestina	50	(3)
2019–2020	Cerignola	24	(0)
2021	Di Benedetto Trinitapoli		
2021–	Bisceglie	9	(1)

Managerial career
- 2024-: Calcio Foggia 1920
- * Club domestic league appearances and goals as of 7 November 2021

Tommaso Coletti (born 9 May 1984) is an Italian football manager of Italian Serie C/C club Calcio Foggia 1920 and former football player as central midfielder.

== Club career ==
Born in Canosa di Puglia, Coletti spent the vast majority of his career playing for Serie C1 clubs, before signing with Serie C2 side Teramo in August 2012. After being an important midfield unit for Teramo he moved to Serie B side Brescia in the following year.

On 7 September Coletti made his division debut, starting in a 1–1 home draw against Novara; his first goal came on 12 October, netting his side's last of a 2–2 draw at Spezia.

On 27 June 2015, he was signed by Foggia for free.

On 25 August 2019, he joined Serie D club Cerignola. On 24 August 2021, he moved to Bisceglie.
