= Alan Lorenzo =

Argentine footballer

Personal information
- Date of birth: 27 July 1998 (age 28)
- Place of birth: Buenos Aires, Argentina
- Height: 1.79 m (5 ft 10 in)
- Position: Defender

Team information
- Current team: Ferro Carril Oeste
- Number: 6

Senior career*
Years	Team	Apps	(Gls)
2017–2023	Nueva Chicago	49	(0)
2024–	Ferro Carril Oeste	38	(0)
- * Club domestic league appearances and goals as of 16:30, 16 June 2025 (UTC)

Alan Lorenzo (born 27 July 1998) is an Argentine professional footballer who plays as a defender for Ferro Carril Oeste.

== Career ==
Lorenzo began his career in Nueva Chicago's system. His first appearance in senior football came in July 2017 during a Primera B Nacional loss to San Martín, he had previously been an unused substitute that month for a fixture with Argentinos Juniors on 12 July. Lorenzo was substituted on against San Martín, with his first start arriving on 18 March 2018 as Instituto defeated Nueva Chicago 1–0.

== Career statistics ==
As of 24 February 2019.

Appearances and goals by club, season and competition
Club	Season	League			Cup		Continental		Other		Total	
Club	Season	Division	Apps	Goals	Apps	Goals	Apps	Goals	Apps	Goals	Apps	Goals
Nueva Chicago	2016–17	Primera B Nacional	1	0	0	0	—		0	0	1	0
Nueva Chicago	2017–18	Primera B Nacional	3	0	0	0	—		0	0	3	0
Nueva Chicago	2018–19	Primera B Nacional	0	0	0	0	—		0	0	0	0
Career total			4	0	0	0	—		0	0	4	0
