= Gonzalo Menéndez (footballer) =

Argentinian footballer

Personal information
- Full name: Gonzalo Ezequiel Menéndez
- Date of birth: 16 December 1992 (age 33)
- Place of birth: Avellaneda (Buenos Aires), Argentina
- Height: 1.81 m (5 ft 11 in)
- Position: Midfielder

Team information
- Current team: 12 de Octubre
- Number: 24

Youth career
- Arsenal de Sarandí

Senior career*
Years	Team	Apps	(Gls)
2010–2011	Arsenal de Sarandí	5	(0)
2012–2013	Deportivo Merlo	32	(0)
2013–2015	Audax Italiano	15	(0)
2015–2016	→ Coquimbo Unido (loan)	13	(0)
2016–2017	Shkëndija	7	(0)
2017–2018	Juventud Antoniana	20	(0)
2018–2019	Deportivo Santaní	20	(0)
2019	Nueva Chicago	2	(0)
2020–	12 de Octubre	5	(0)
- * Club domestic league appearances and goals as of 17:56, 11 May 2020 (UTC)

Gonzalo Ezequiel Menéndez (born 16 December 1992) is an Argentine footballer. He was born in Avellaneda (Buenos Aires), Argentina and currently plays for 12 de Octubre in Paraguay.
