= Mariano Izco =

Argentine footballer

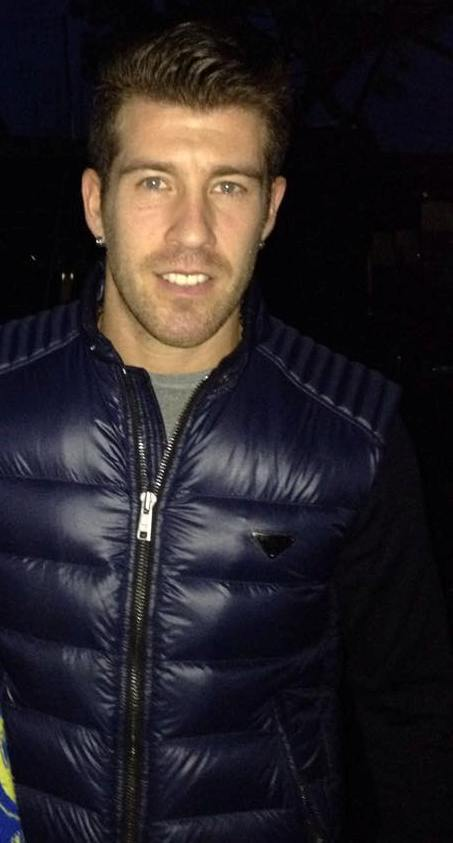
- Izco in 2011

Personal information
- Full name: Mariano Julio Izco
- Date of birth: 13 March 1983 (age 43)
- Place of birth: Buenos Aires, Argentina
- Height: 1.80 m (5 ft 11 in)
- Position: Midfielder

Youth career
- San Telmo

Senior career*
| Years | Team | Apps | (Gls) |
| 2000–2004 | San Telmo | 93 | (4) |
| 2004–2005 | Almagro | 6 | (0) |
| 2005–2006 | Tigre | 27 | (1) |
| 2006–2014 | Catania | 218 | (6) |
| 2014–2017 | Chievo | 53 | (2) |
| 2017–2018 | Crotone | 5 | (0) |
| 2019 | Cosenza | 3 | (0) |
| 2019–2020 | Juve Stabia | 10 | (0) |
| 2020–2022 | Catania | 43 | (0) |
- * Club domestic league appearances and goals as of 3 April 2022

Mariano Julio Izco (born 13 March 1983) is an Argentine former professional footballer. He also holds an Italian passport.

== Club career ==
=== CA San Telmo ===
Izco began his career in the regionalised 3rd division of Argentine football with Club Atlético San Telmo, in 2000. The player went on to make 93 appearances, scoring 4 goals for his club, in 4 full seasons. In 2004, he was signed by Club Almagro, of the Argentine Primera Division.

=== Club Almagro ===
In July 2004, Izco signed for Club Almagro, where he would play during the 2004–05 season. Izco made just 6 appearances, and could not help Almagro avoid relegation at the end of the season. With the relegation of Almagro, Izco was transferred to 2nd Division team Club Atlético Tigre.

=== Club Atlético Tigre ===
After a season in the top flight, Izco spent one season with Club Atlético Tigre, where he made 27 appearances, scoring a single goal.

After one season with Tigre, Izco was scouted by newly promoted Serie A club, Calcio Catania and made his transfer to the Italian club in August 2006.

=== Calcio Catania ===
Izco officially transferred to the Sicilian club in August 2006, as the club looked for reinforcements following their promotion from Serie B. Izco made his debut for the Catania in their 2–0 victory over Parma. In his first season with Catania, Izco made 19 appearances in the league under then-coach Pasquale Marino, helping his team to a 13th-place finish. In his second season in Italy, Izco had a greater impact with his team, starting regularly, and helping his team to avoid relegation yet again. He made 32 appearances in the league under Silvio Baldini for the 2007–08 season. Walter Zenga took charge of Catania for the 2008–09 campaign, and Izco went on to make 27 appearances under the new coach, helping Catania to a 15th-place finish. Gianluca Atzori took the helm at the club at the start of the 2009–10 season, but after three months was sacked as the club lingered in 19th place with just 1 win. On 8 December 2009, Siniša Mihajlović became manager, and the club started off with a bang, as they defeated Serie A giants Juventus 2–1, with Izco scoring his first Serie A goal. Izco managed just 15 total appearances during the 2010–11 Serie A season for his club, helping lift the club to a 13th-place finish and a record points total for the club for a third consecutive season.

Since his debut in 2006, Izco has been one of Catania's most valuable players throughout his stint at the Sicilian club, consistently being featured in the starting lineup. He was the club's vice-captain and holds the club's record in number of league appearances in Serie A. He was also part of a record-breaking Catania outfit that had picked up 56 points from 38 Serie A matches. This performance saw the club also break its record number of home victories in a single season, its record number of victories overall in a single top flight campaign, as well as its record points total in Serie A for the fifth consecutive season.

=== Cosenza ===
On 22 February 2019, he signed with Serie B club Cosenza until the end of the 2018–19 season.

=== Juve Stabia ===
On 2 August 2019, Izco signed with S.S. Juve Stabia.

=== Return to Catania ===
On 9 September 2020 he returned to Catania and signed a one-year contract with the club holding an option to extend it for another year.

On 9 April 2022, he was released together with all of his Catania teammates following the club's exclusion from Italian football due to its inability to overcome a number of financial issues.

On 4 November 2022, Izco announced his retirement.

== Personal life ==
He is the older brother of Rodrigo Izco.
