= Nicolás Franco (footballer) =

Argentine footballer

Personal information
- Date of birth: 29 April 1996 (age 30)
- Place of birth: Azul, Argentina
- Height: 1.83 m (6 ft 0 in)
- Position: Centre-forward

Team information
- Current team: Santamarina

Youth career
- River Plate

Senior career*
Years	Team	Apps	(Gls)
2016–2018	River Plate	0	(0)
2016	→ Freamunde (loan)	0	(0)
2017–2018	→ Aldosivi (loan)	8	(0)
2018–2019	Nueva Chicago	21	(9)
2019	Oriente Petrolero	17	(7)
2020	Peñarol	1	(0)
2021	Patronato	14	(0)
2022–2024	San Martín SJ	60	(10)
2025–2026	Colegiales	18	(1)
2026–	Santamarina	0	(0)
- * Club domestic league appearances and goals as of 17:50, 13 March 2026 (UTC)

Nicolás Franco (born 29 April 1996) is an Argentine professional footballer who plays as a centre-forward for Torneo Federal A club Santamarina.

== Career ==
Franco played for the River Plate youth academy, featuring for the U20 side at the 2016 U-20 Copa Libertadores. Franco started his senior career in 2016 with Argentine Primera División side River Plate, he was an unused substitute for a match with Vélez Sarsfield on 30 April. On 4 July 2016, Franco joined LigaPro side Freamunde on loan. He returned to River Plate six months later without featuring. In July 2017, Aldosivi loaned Franco. He made his professional debut on 4 September in a Copa Argentina home loss to Vélez Sarsfield, prior to making a first league appearance against Santamarina on 16 September.

Franco permanently departed River Plate in June 2018 to join Nueva Chicago of Primera B Nacional. He scored nine goals in his sole season with them, notably netting braces against Independiente Rivadavia; once in the regular season and once in the play-offs, which they lost. June 2019 saw Franco head abroad to Bolivian Primera División team Oriente Petrolero. Seven goals occurred during 2019, which included braces over Real Potosí and Bolívar. In March 2020, Franco headed to Uruguay with Peñarol. He made his debut against Montevideo City Torque on 12 September, though was subbed off early due to injury.

Franco returned to Argentina with Patronato in January 2021. After a year at Patronato, Franco signed with San Martín de San Juan in January 2022.

== Career statistics ==
As of 30 January 2021.

Club statistics
Club	Season	League			Cup		League Cup		Continental		Other		Total	
Club	Season	Division	Apps	Goals	Apps	Goals	Apps	Goals	Apps	Goals	Apps	Goals	Apps	Goals
River Plate	2016	Argentine Primera División	0	0	0	0	—		0	0	0	0	0	0
River Plate	2016–17	Argentine Primera División	0	0	0	0	—		0	0	0	0	0	0
River Plate	2017–18	Argentine Primera División	0	0	0	0	—		0	0	0	0	0	0
River Plate	Total		0	0	0	0	—		0	0	0	0	0	0
Freamunde (loan)	2016–17	LigaPro	0	0	0	0	—		—		0	0	0	0
Aldosivi (loan)	2017–18	Primera B Nacional	8	0	1	0	—		—		0	0	9	0
Nueva Chicago	2018–19	Primera B Nacional	21	9	0	0	—		—		0	0	21	9
Oriente Petrolero	2019	Bolivian Primera División	17	7	—		—		—		0	0	17	7
Peñarol	2020	Uruguayan Primera División	1	0	—		—		0	0	0	0	1	0
Patronato	2021	Argentine Primera División	0	0	0	0	—		—		0	0	0	0
Career total			47	16	1	0	—		0	0	0	0	48	16

== Honours ==
Aldosivi

- Primera B Nacional: 2017–18
