= AS Bisceglie Calcio 1913 =

Italian football club

Bisceglie
- Full name: Associazione Sportiva Bisceglie Calcio 1913
- Founded: 1913
- Ground: Stadio Gustavo Ventura, Bisceglie, Italy
- Capacity: 3,200
- President: Antonio Mari
- Head coach: Pino di Meo
- League: Eccellenza Apulia
- 2024–25: 4th of 18
- Website: https://www.asbiscegliecalcio.it/
| Home colours | Away colours | Third colours |

Associazione Sportiva Bisceglie Calcio 1913, commonly referred to as Bisceglie, is an Italian association football club based in Bisceglie, Apulia.

As of 2025–26, it plays in Eccellenza, the fifth tier of Italian football.

== History ==
Associazione Sportiva Bisceglie Calcio 1913 was founded in 1913.

The club has played 4 seasons in Serie C and 12 in Serie C2.

=== Coppa Italia Dilettanti ===
In the 2011–12 season the club won:

- Coppa Italia Dilettanti 2011–12, obtaining so the direct promotion to Serie D, beating 2–1 Pisa Sporting Club A.S.D., a team from Eccellenza Tuscany Group A.
- Coppa Italia Puglia.

== Colors and badge ==
The team's kit has black and blue stripes.

== Honours ==
- Serie D:
  - Winner (3): 1957,58, 1959–60, 1985–86
- Coppa Italia Dilettanti:
  - Champion (1): 2011–12
- Regional Coppa Italia Apulia:
  - Winner (1): 2011–12

== Current squad ==
As of 1 July 2022

Note: Flags indicate national team as defined under FIFA eligibility rules; some limited exceptions apply. Players may hold more than one non-FIFA nationality.

| No. | Pos. | Nation | Player |
|---|---|---|---|
| 1 | GK | ITA | Alessio Martorel |
| 3 | DF | ITA | Roberto Farinola |
| 4 | DF | ARG | Rodrigo Izco |
| 5 | MF | ITA | Walter Cozza |
| 6 | DF | ITA | Mario D'Angelo |
| 8 | MF | ITA | Michele Di Prisco |
| 9 | FW | ITA | Savino Leonetti |
| 10 | FW | ITA | Calogero La Piana |
| 11 | FW | ITA | Giovanni Lorusso |
| 12 | GK | ITA | Giacinto Zinfollino |
| 14 | MF | ITA | Davide Liso |
| 16 | MF | ITA | Claudio Ferrante |

| No. | Pos. | Nation | Player |
|---|---|---|---|
| 17 | MF | ITA | Fortunato Carbone |
| 18 | MF | ITA | Alessio Tuttisanti |
| 19 | DF | ITA | Luigi Barletta |
| 21 | MF | ITA | Tommaso Coletti |
| 23 | DF | ITA | Giacomo Ligorio |
| 24 | DF | ARG | Facundo Urquiza |
| 27 | MF | ITA | Angelo Rubino |
| 30 | MF | ITA | Brandon Goffredo |
| 33 | DF | ITA | Daniele Marino |
| 41 | MF | ITA | Michele Fucci |
| 70 | FW | ITA | Cristofaro Morra |
