= Gonzalo Miceli =

Argentine footballer

Personal information
- Date of birth: 18 September 1997 (age 29)
- Place of birth: Argentina
- Height: 1.75 m (5 ft 9 in)
- Position: Midfielder

Team information
- Current team: Villarrobledo

Youth career
- Nueva Chicago

Senior career*
Years	Team	Apps	(Gls)
2017–2021	Nueva Chicago	46	(1)
2021	Banfield	2	(0)
2022–2023	Brown de Adrogué	20	(0)
2024	Deportivo Merlo	29	(1)
2024	SJK	1	(0)
2025–	Villarrobledo	0	(0)
- * Club domestic league appearances and goals as of 26 August 2024

Gonzalo Miceli (born 18 September 1997) is an Argentine professional footballer who plays as a midfielder for Villarrobledo.

== Career ==
Miceli was promoted into the senior side of Primera B Nacional team Nueva Chicago in 2017–18, initially being a substitute for matches against Deportivo Morón, Quilmes and Gimnasia y Esgrima. Juan José Serrizuela was the manager who selected Miceli for his professional debut on 18 March 2018 against Instituto, which was followed by three more appearances in his debut campaign.

For the 2021 season, Miceli signed with Banfield in top-tier Primera División, but made only three appearances for the club.

During 2022–2023, he played for Brown de Adrogué in Argentine second-tier Primera Nacional.

In early 2024, Miceli signed with Deportivo Merlo in third-tier Primera B Metropolitana.

On 21 August 2024, Miceli moved to Finland and signed with Seinäjoen Jalkapallokerho (SJK) in country's top-tier Veikkausliiga on a deal until June 2025, with an option to extend until the end of the 2026 season. His deal was terminated on 16 January 2025. He made only one appearance for the club, as a substitute.

== Career statistics ==
As of 26 August 2024.

Appearances and goals by club, season and competition
Club	Season	League			Cup		Continental		Other		Total	
Club	Season	Division	Apps	Goals	Apps	Goals	Apps	Goals	Apps	Goals	Apps	Goals
Nueva Chicago	2017–18	Primera Nacional	4	0	0	0	—		—		4	0
Nueva Chicago	2018–19	Primera Nacional	20	0	0	0	—		—		20	0
Nueva Chicago	2019–20	Primera Nacional	15	1	1	0	—		—		16	1
Nueva Chicago	2020	Primera Nacional	1	0	0	0	—		—		1	0
Nueva Chicago	2021	Primera Nacional	6	0	0	0	—		—		6	0
Nueva Chicago	Total		46	1	1	0	0	0	0	0	46	1
Banfield	2021	Primera División	2	0	1	0	—		—		3	0
Brown de Adrogué	2022	Primera Nacional	20	0	1	0	—		—		21	0
Brown de Adrogué	2023	Primera Nacional	0	0	0	0	—		—		0	0
Brown de Adrogué	Total		20	0	1	0	0	0	0	0	21	0
Deportivo Merlo	2024	Primera B Metropolitana	29	1	0	0	—		—		29	1
SJK Seinäjoki	2024	Veikkausliiga	1	0	0	0	–		0	0	1	0
Villarrobledo	2024–25	Tercera Federación	0	0	–		–		–		0	0
Career total			98	2	3	0	0	0	0	0	101	2
