= Lomas del Mirador =

- City
- Location in Greater Buenos Aires
- Coordinates: 34°40′00″S 58°31′47″W
- Country: Argentina
- Province: Buenos Aires
- Partido: La Matanza
- Established: 1909

Area
  - Total: 5.5 km^{2} (2.1 sq mi)
- Elevation: 22 m (72 ft)

Population (2001 census [INDEC])
  - Total: 51,488
  - Density: 9,400/km^{2} (24,000/sq mi)
- CPA Base: B 1752
- Area code: +54 011
- Website: Municipio de La Matanza: Lomas del Mirador

Lomas del Mirador is a city of the La Matanza Partido in Greater Buenos Aires. Located outside Buenos Aires along the southwest edge of the General Paz Freeway, the city has a population of 51,488 (INDEC, 2001).

The land where Lomas del Mirador is located was sold by Ezequiel Ramos Mexía to Pablo Pelluse in 1868. The ranch at the site was known as Terrenos del Mirador ("the lookout property") in reference to the estancia therein, Mirador Santa Lucía. A neighboring property was owned by the descendants of Governor Manuel Dorrego, a key figure in the Argentine Civil Wars of the 19th century, and the city shield would include a red lookout tower in reference to both the town's name and that family's allegiance to the Federalists during the civil wars.

These properties were later sold, and in 1909, the first lots were parceled to investors and homesteaders. It would later be home to a diversified base of light industry, notably the former Jabón Federal ("Federal Soap") facility. The Provincial Legislature declared Lomas del Mirador a city in 1984.

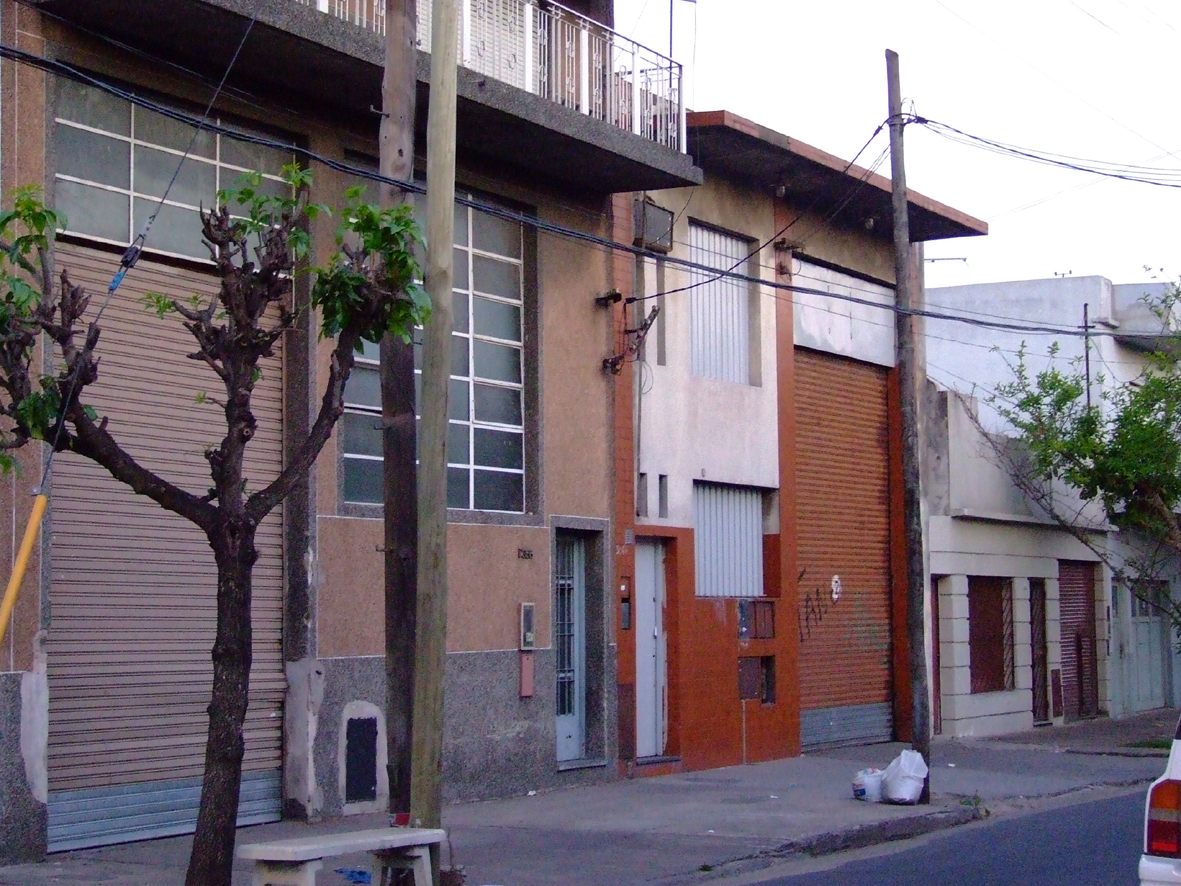
Characteristic street in Lomas del Mirador
