= Paul Charpentier =

Argentine professional footballer

Personal information
- Date of birth: 1 May 2000 (age 26)
- Place of birth: Buenos Aires, Argentina
- Height: 1.88 m (6 ft 2 in)
- Position: Forward

Team information
- Current team: Atlético Tembetary (on loan from Nueva Chicago)
- Number: 11

Senior career*
Years	Team	Apps	(Gls)
2017–	Nueva Chicago	57	(8)
2019–2020	→ Sacachispas (loan)	2	(0)
2023	→ Sportivo Luqueño (loan)	44	(8)
2024	→ Guaraní (loan)	15	(2)
2024	→ Sportivo Trinidense (loan)	16	(5)
2025	→ Deportes Limache (loan)	7	(0)
2025–	→ Atlético Tembetary (loan)	17	(5)
- * Club domestic league appearances and goals as of 14:41, 4 June 2023 (UTC)

Paul Charpentier (born 1 May 2000) is an Argentine professional footballer who plays as a forward for Paraguayan club Atlético Tembetary on loan from Nueva Chicago.

== Club career ==
Charpentier got his senior career underway with Nueva Chicago. The 2016–17 campaign in Primera B Nacional saw Charpentier make the breakthrough into senior, professional football, with the forward coming off the substitutes bench in a defeat away to Juventud Unida on 21 June 2017 for his debut; he was aged seventeen at the time. He made four more appearances that season, whilst also netting his first goal during a home match with eventual champions Argentinos Juniors in July. In 2017, Charpentier had a trial with River Plate; without the permission of Nueva Chicago, who accused them of tapping up the player.

In January 2025, Charpentier was loaned out to Chilean club Deportes Limache. In the second half of the same year, he switched to Paraguayan club Atlético Tembetary.

== International career ==
In February 2018, Charpentier received a call-up to train with the Argentina U19s.

== Career statistics ==
As of 11 October 2022.

Appearances and goals by club, season and competition
Club	Division	League			Cup		Continental		Total	
Club	Division	Season	Apps	Goals	Apps	Goals	Apps	Goals	Apps	Goals
Nueva Chicago	Primera B Nacional	2016-17	5	1	0	0	—		5	1
Nueva Chicago	Primera B Nacional	2017-18	1	0	0	0	—		1	0
Nueva Chicago	Primera B Nacional	2018-19	0	0	0	0	—		0	0
Nueva Chicago	Total		6	1	0	0	0	0	6	1
Sacachispas	Primera B Nacional	2022	2	0	0	0	—		2	0
Nueva Chicago	Primera B Nacional	2020	1	0	0	0	—		1	0
Nueva Chicago	Primera B Nacional	2021	20	2	0	0	—		20	2
Nueva Chicago	Primera B Nacional	2022	29	5	0	0	—		29	5
Nueva Chicago	Total		50	7	0	0	0	0	50	7
Sportivo Luqueño	Paraguayan Primera División	2023	25	6	0	0	1	0	26	6
Career total			84	14	0	0	0	0	84	14
