= Estadio Nueva Chicago =

Football stadium in Buenos Aires, Argentina

Nueva Chicago Stadium
- Estadio Nueva Chicago
- Estadio República de Mataderos

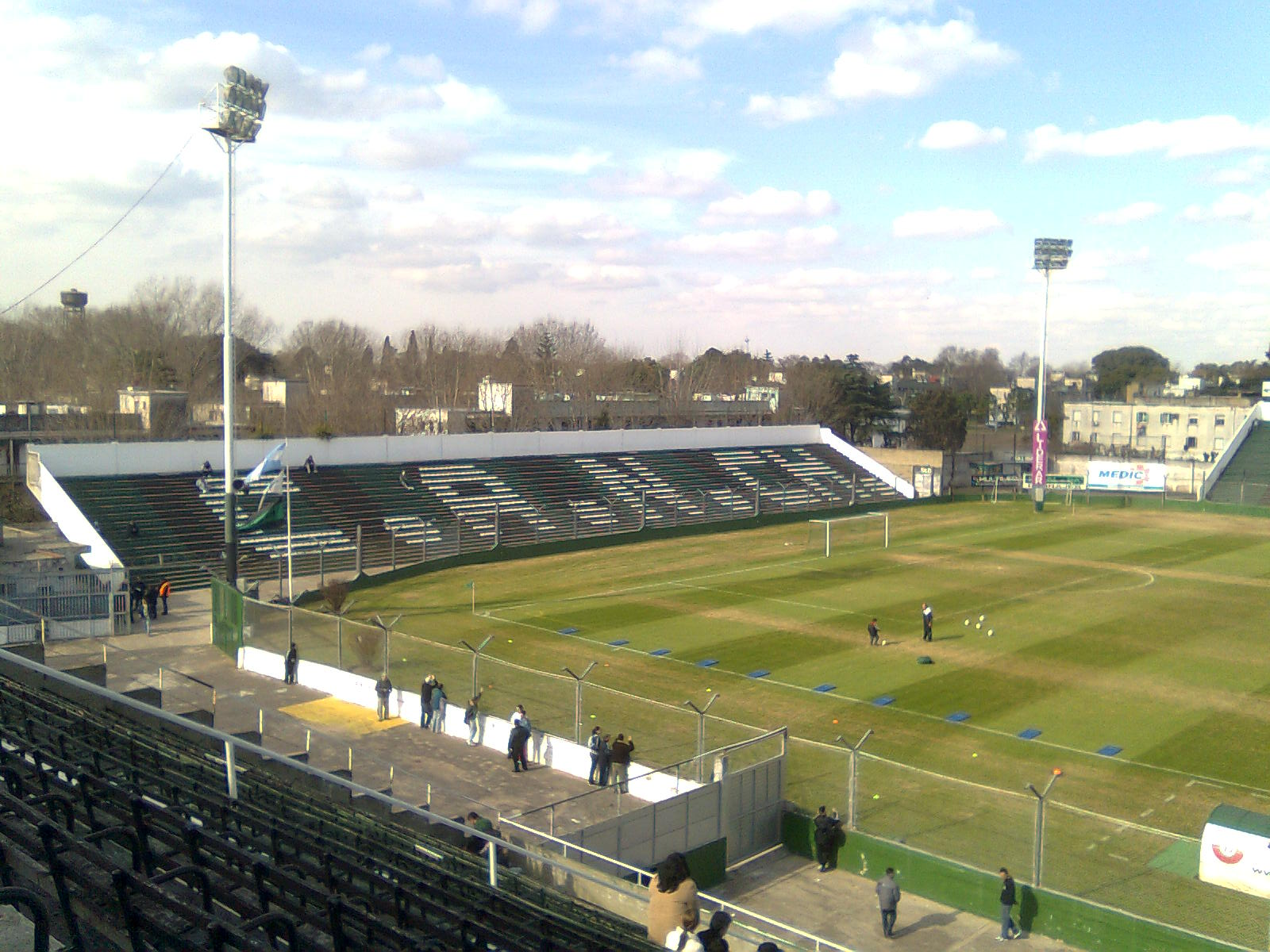
- The stadium in 2010
- Interactive map of Nueva Chicago Stadium
- Address: Justo Suárez 6900; Buenos Aires; Argentina
- Coordinates: 34°40′05″S 58°29′59″W
- Owner: C.A. Nueva Chicago
- Capacity: 18,000
- Type: Stadium
- Surface: Grass

Construction
- Opened: 27 October 1940; 85 years ago
- Architect: Dartiguelongue

Estadio Nueva Chicago is a football stadium located in the Mataderos neighborhood of Buenos Aires, Argentina. It is also popularly known as Estadio República de Mataderos. The stadium, inaugurated in 1940, is owned and operated by Club Atlético Nueva Chicago. It has a capacity of 18,000.

== History ==
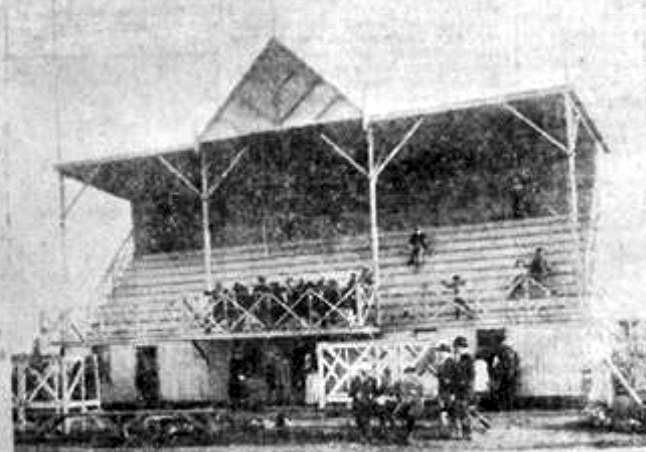
The first field, on Piedrabuena and Campana streets, c. 1925

During their first years of existence, Nueva Chicago played in fields located near the "Mercado de Hacienda" in Mataderos. In 1920 the club started using a field on Piedrabuena and Av. Campana (now "Avenida del Trabajo") streets. Nueva Chicago played their home matches there until 1934. In successive years, the team played in other clubs stadiums.

As the land on Piedrabuena and Av. Campana was chosen to build a new hospital (current Mataderos Health Center), Nueva Chicago had to leave it. The club acquired a new land, starting to build a stadium, which was inaugurated in 1940 in a Tercera División match vs Sportivo Buenos Aires, won by Chicago 2–0. That victory also allowed the team to be crowned champion, promoting to Segunda División.

In September 1944, the club inaugurated a velodrome, surrounding the pitch of the stadium. The track had a circumference of 370 metre. Between mid-1970s and early 1990s, the stadium hosted speedway and midget races, held in the former velodrome track.
