= Adrián González (footballer, born 1995) =

Argentine footballer

Personal information
- Full name: Adrián Américo González
- Date of birth: 6 July 1995 (age 31)
- Place of birth: San Justo, Argentina
- Height: 1.78 m (5 ft 10 in)
- Position: Centre-back

Team information
- Current team: Crucero del Norte

Senior career*
Years	Team	Apps	(Gls)
2016–2020	Nueva Chicago	49	(1)
2020	Huracán CR		
2021	Comunicaciones	12	(0)
2022–	Crucero del Norte	11	(0)
- * Club domestic league appearances and goals as of 21:02, 22 January 2023 (UTC)

Adrián Américo González (born 6 July 1995) is an Argentine professional footballer who plays as a centre-back for Crucero del Norte.

== Career ==
González made his bow into senior football with Nueva Chicago. After featuring in a 6–4 victory over Villa Dálmine on 29 April 2016 and a defeat to Juventud Unida Universitario in May, González scored his first goal in his third appearance against Central Córdoba on 1 June 2016. He made a total of six appearances in the 2016 Primera B Nacional, which was followed by a further thirty-seven across his next two seasons. González was released in June 2020.

== Career statistics ==
As of 23 June 2020.

Appearances and goals by club, season and competition
Club	Season	League			Cup		Continental		Other		Total	
Club	Season	Division	Apps	Goals	Apps	Goals	Apps	Goals	Apps	Goals	Apps	Goals
Nueva Chicago	2016	Primera B Nacional	6	1	0	0	—		0	0	6	1
Nueva Chicago	2016–17	Primera B Nacional	18	0	1	0	—		0	0	19	0
Nueva Chicago	2017–18	Primera B Nacional	18	0	0	0	—		0	0	18	0
Nueva Chicago	2018–19	Primera B Nacional	6	0	0	0	—		0	0	6	0
Nueva Chicago	2019–20	Primera B Nacional	1	0	0	0	—		0	0	1	0
Career total			49	1	1	0	—		0	0	50	1
