= Lucas López (footballer, born 1998) =

Argentine footballer

Personal information
- Date of birth: 30 January 1998 (age 28)
- Place of birth: Argentina
- Height: 1.79 m (5 ft 10 in)
- Position: Midfielder

Team information
- Current team: Nueva Chicago

Youth career
- Nueva Chicago

Senior career*
Years	Team	Apps	(Gls)
2019–	Nueva Chicago	31	(0)
2024	→ Barracas Central (loan)	2	(0)
- * Club domestic league appearances and goals as of 17:14, 13 April 2026 (UTC)

Lucas López (born 30 January 1998) is an Argentine professional footballer who plays as a midfielder for Nueva Chicago.

== Career ==
López progressed through the Nueva Chicago youth academy. He was moved to the first-team in 2019 under Walter Perazzo for an encounter against Central Córdoba on 3 April 2019 in the Copa Argentina, as he came off the substitutes bench on sixty-one minutes in place of Gonzalo Miceli during a home defeat. López made his Primera B Nacional debut as a second-half substitute in a 3–2 loss to Quilmes, where he was fouled in the area in the 91st minute and teammate Alejandro Melo converted the resulting penalty.

== Career statistics ==
As of 4 April 2019.

Appearances and goals by club, season and competition
Club	Season	League			Cup		Continental		Other		Total	
Club	Season	Division	Apps	Goals	Apps	Goals	Apps	Goals	Apps	Goals	Apps	Goals
Nueva Chicago	2018–19	Primera B Nacional	2	0	1	0	—		0	0	3	0
Career total			2	0	1	0	—		0	0	3	0
