= Mataderos =

Coordinates: 34°40′S 58°30′W

- Neighborhood of Buenos Aires
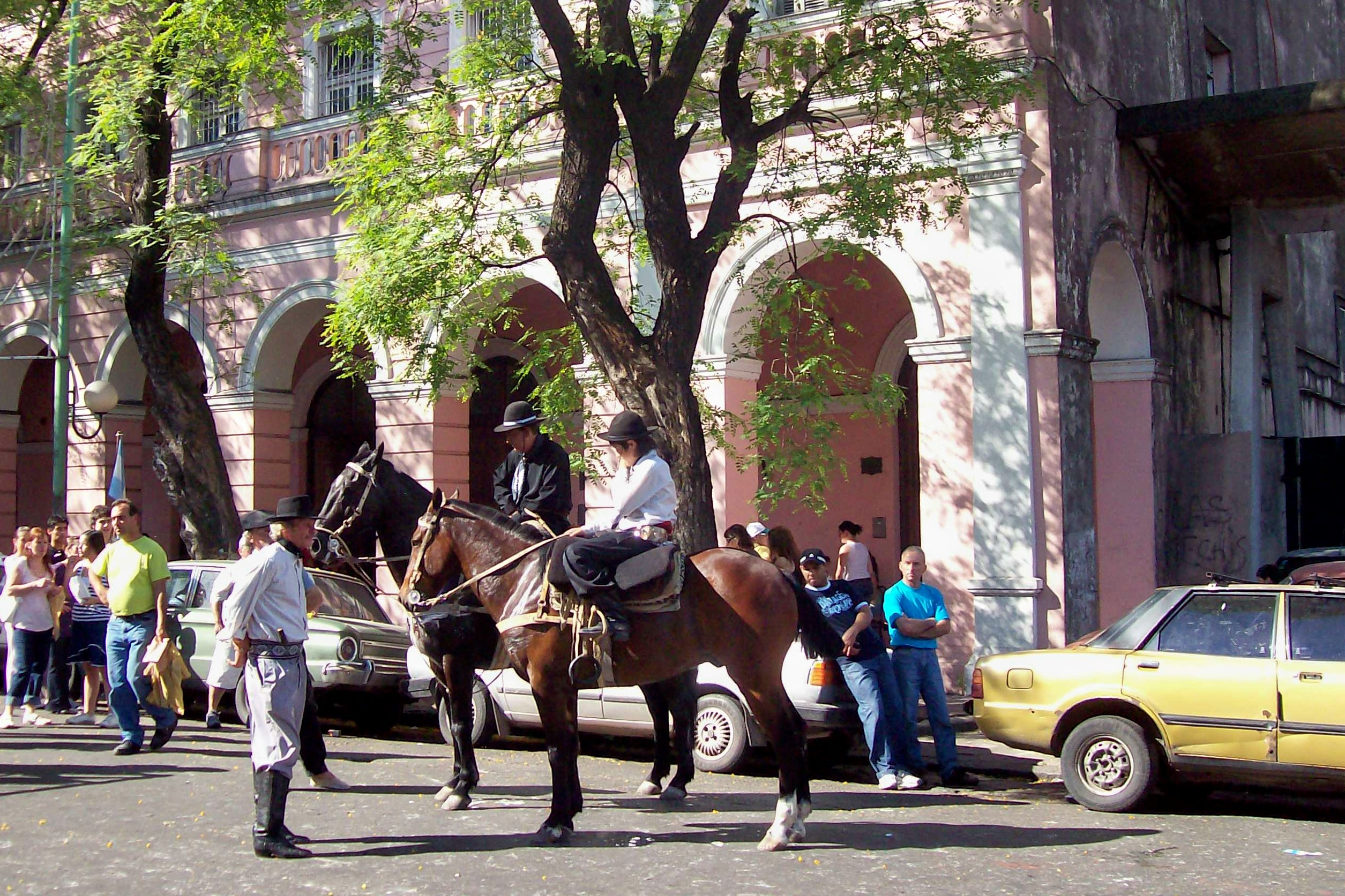
- Gauchos at the annual Mataderos Fair

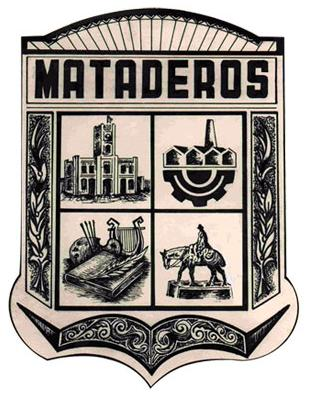
- Seal

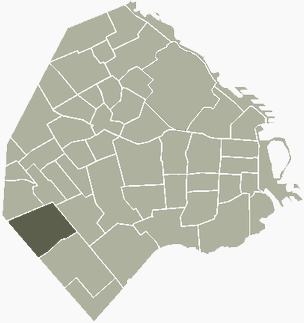
- Location of Mataderos within the Autonomous City of Buenos Aires
- Country: Argentina
- Autonomous City: Buenos Aires
- Comuna: C9
- Important sites: Estadio Nueva Chicago

Area
  - Total: 7.6 km^{2} (2.9 sq mi)

Population ((INDEC 2001))
  - Total: 64,932
  - Density: 8,500/km^{2} (22,000/sq mi)
- Time zone: UTC-3 (ART)

Mataderos (Spanish for "slaughterhouses") is a barrio (neighbourhood) in Buenos Aires, Argentina. It is one of the three barrios that make up the Comuna 9, alongside Liniers and Parque Avellaneda. Located in the south-west end of the city, it takes its name from the livestock market and various slaughterhouses located within it.

== History ==
For much of its history, the area was a meeting point between the city and the countryside, and thus became a hub for rural commerce, and the main stop for gauchos inside city limits. Many famous payadas (improvised lyric contests) took place in the neighborhood bars.

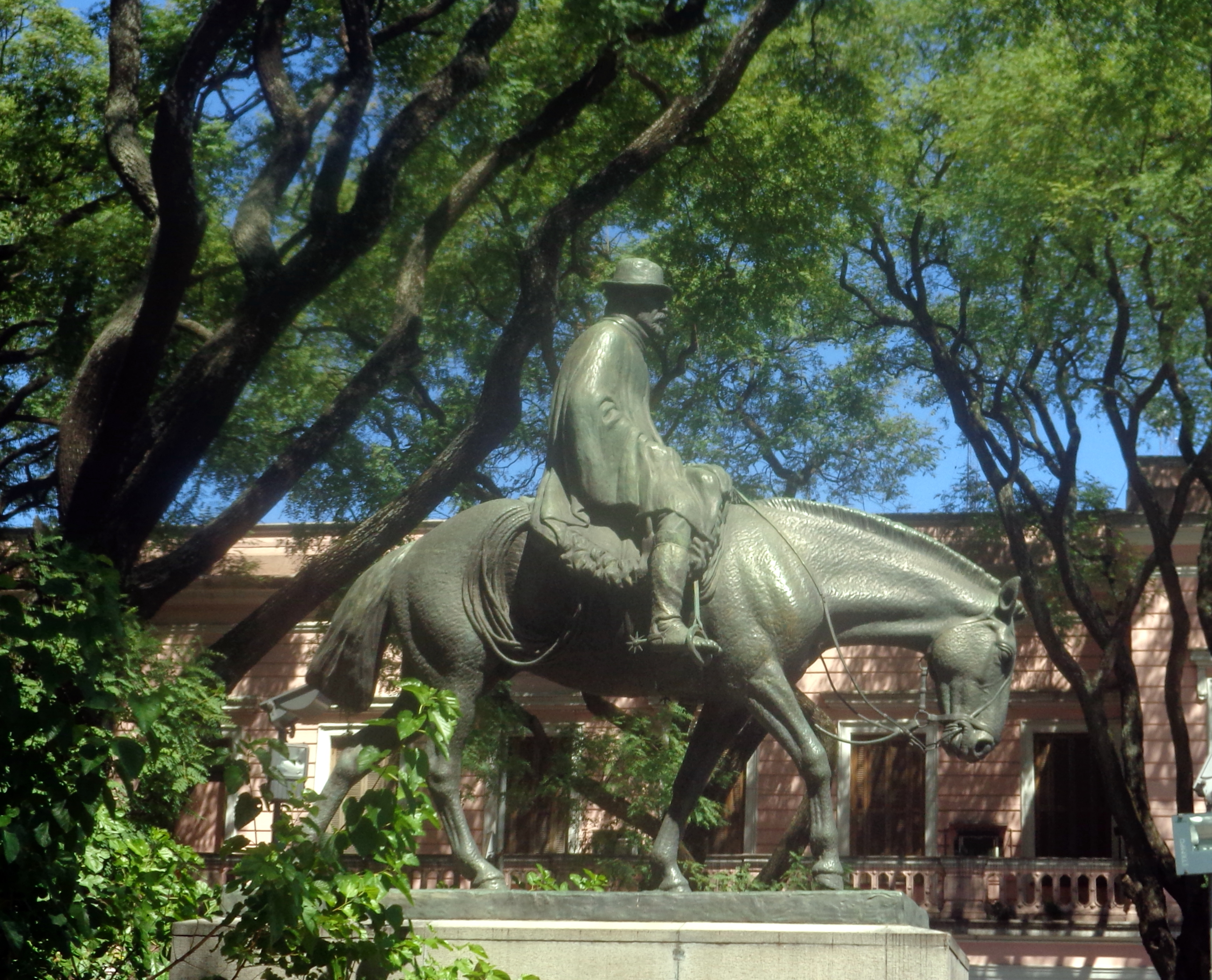
El Resero, a monument to the herdsmen that wrangle the thousands of cattle sold daily at the Liniers Market.

Mataderos is the site of the 34 hectares (84 acres) Mercado de Liniers (the National Cattle Ranchers' Market), established in 1900, where up to 50,000 cattle are sold weekly to supply the beef market for the Greater Buenos Aires area; its headquarters, an Italianate arcade completed in 1899, also houses the Museo de los Corrales Viejos (Old Corrals Museum). The courtyard facing the headquarters is known for Emilio Sarniguet's monument, El Resero (The Herdsman), completed in 1931 and moved to its present location in 1934. A 2001 municipal ordinance mandating the market's relocation to San Vicente, 45 kilometres (28 mi) southwest of Buenos Aires, has been repeatedly postponed due to cattle vendor objections regarding the cost of relocation.

== Features ==
Block parties at the old marketplace on Avenida de los Corrales, sometimes featuring tango and milonga, are famous for their vibrancy. The neighborhood also features a lively commercial area along Eva Perón avenue, and the colorful Mataderos Fair; established on June 8, 1986, the Mataderos Fair is held on Sundays and showcases gaucho traditions, cuisine, and crafts.

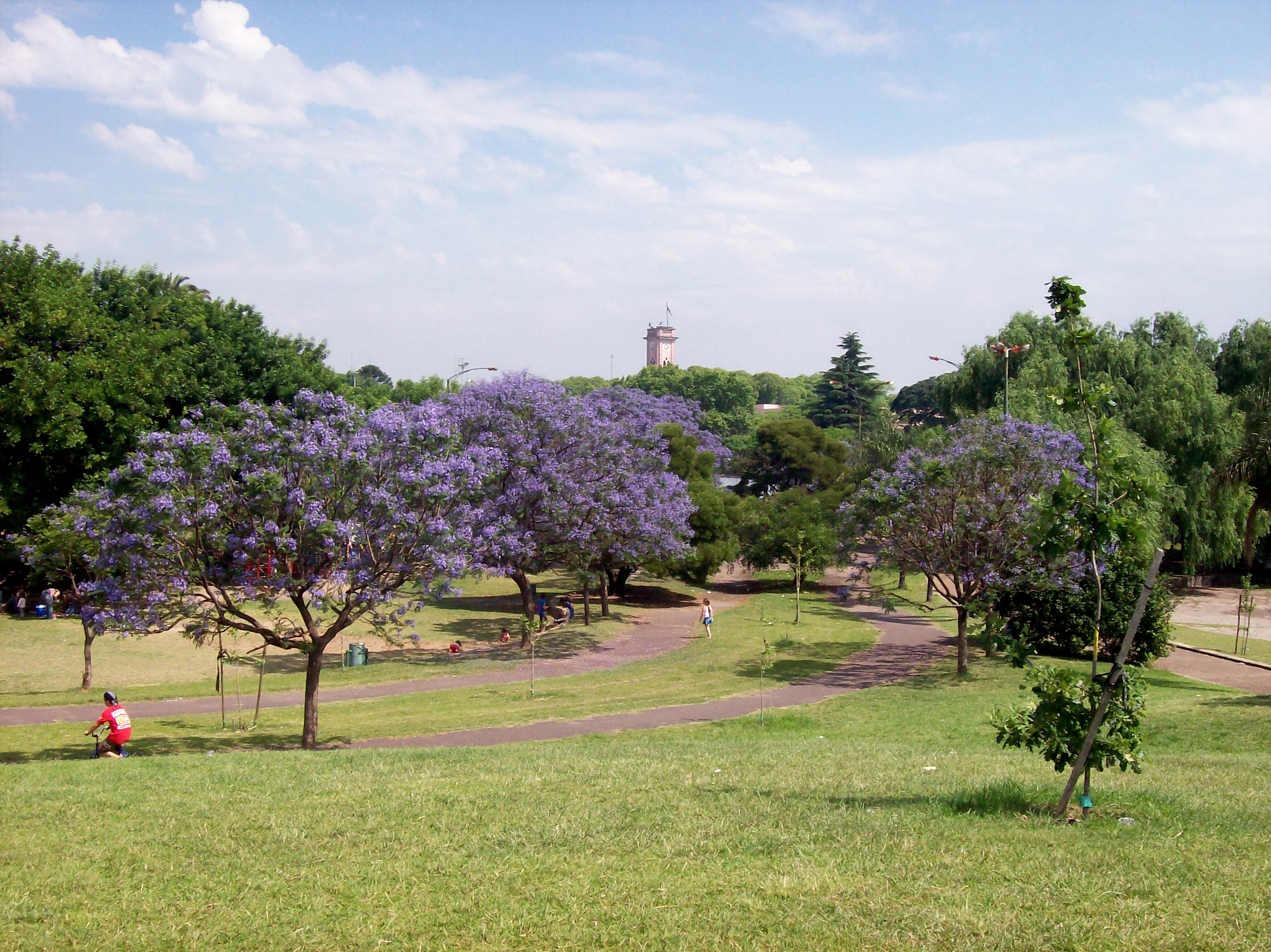
Jacarandas in bloom, Alberdi Park.

One of the city's largest public housing developments, Los Perales, was built just south of the Liniers Market by Juan Perón's administration in 1949. The neighborhood football club, Club Atlético Nueva Chicago, currently play in the Primera Nacional, the second division of Argentine football league system.

== Notable people ==
- Ernesto Bessone, stock-car race driver
- Alberto Castillo, singer and actor
- Nicolás Cabré, actor
- The Lombard Twins, twin dancers, choreographers, actors, directors, composers and producers, known for their role in the Step Up series
- Ricardo Melogno, spree killer known as the Taxi Drivers Killer
- Justo Suárez, known as El Torito de Mataderos ("the Little Bull from Mataderos"), boxer. Fought for the Lightweight world title in 1931, and lost to Billy Petrolle
- Saúl Ubaldini, trade unionist and politician
