= Facundo Argüello (footballer) =

Argentine footballer (born 1979)

Personal information
- Full name: Facundo Matías Argüello
- Date of birth: 23 February 1979 (age 47)
- Place of birth: Buenos Aires, Argentina
- Position: Defender

Team information
- Current team: Nueva Chicago

Senior career*
Years	Team	Apps	(Gls)
1998–2003	Nueva Chicago	51	(3)
2003–2004	Huracán		
2004	Atlético de Rafaela		
2005	Millonarios		
2006	Hapoel Petah Tikva		
2006	Kuala Lumpur FA		
2006–2007	Instituto		
2008–	Nueva Chicago		
- * Club domestic league appearances and goals as of 5 May 2008

Facundo Martin Argüello (born 23 February 1979 in Buenos Aires) is an Argentine footballer who currently plays for Club Atlético Nueva Chicago.
