= Club Atlético Nueva Chicago =

Association football club in Argentina

Nueva Chicago
- Full name: Club Atlético Nueva Chicago
- Nicknames: El Torito de Mataderos; Verdinegro; Gigante
- Founded: 1 July 1911; 115 years ago
- Ground: Estadio Nueva Chicago; Mataderos, Buenos Aires
- Capacity: 28,500
- Chairman: Rodolfo Block
- Coach: Germán Lanaro
- League: Primera Nacional
- 2025: Primera Nacional Zone B, 11th of 18
- Website: canuevachicago.com.ar
Home colours	Away colours

Club Atlético Nueva Chicago is an Argentine sports club based in Mataderos, a neighborhood in the west side of Buenos Aires, formerly called "Nueva Chicago". The club's nickname, El Torito (lit. 'The Little Bull') is an allusion to legendary 1930s boxer Justo Suárez, known as El Torito de Mataderos ('The Little Bull of Mataderos').

The club is mostly known for its football team, which currently plays in Primera B Nacional, the second division of the Argentine football league system. Other sports practised at the club are basketball, boxing, field hockey, futsal, handball, roller skating and volleyball.

== History ==
On 1 July 1911, a group of young people aged 15 to 30 met in a public park (more specifically on the wooden bridge located in the corner of Tellier and Francisco Bilbao streets) to form a football team. The name chosen was "Los Unidos de Nueva Chicago", naming Pedro San Martín as president, along with Felipe Maglio as vice-president. The club's activities started on an empty lot located behind a slaughterhouse.

There were many proposals to define the team colours. Some wished to adopt the colours from Alumni, red and white; others suggested to use Racing Club colors, light blue and white. During their discussion, a truck loaded with bundles which had green and black colours went pass the Campana (today Crovara) Avenue. Those colours were immediately adopted as club colours.

The club executives worked intensively in getting a field where to play. Alejandro Morh, a Mercado de Hacienda manager, donated the land where the first field was established. But it lasted a short time due to the flood waters that cross under the field. Nueva Chicago was given a land on Tellier and Francisco Bilbao Avenues. The team played there from 1912 to 1920.

The third field was located on Piedrabuena and Campana (currently Eva Perón) avenues. That was the field where Chicago played its first games in Primera División and opened in June 1920 when the team defeated Huracán by 2–0. In this field, Nueva Chicago would also win the Copa de Competencia Jockey Club in 1933, its first title in Primera División. When football became professional in Argentina, the Football Association did not authorise to play official matches there, so Nueva Chicago had to play in other stadiums. Three years later, the land were expropriated to build a hospital.

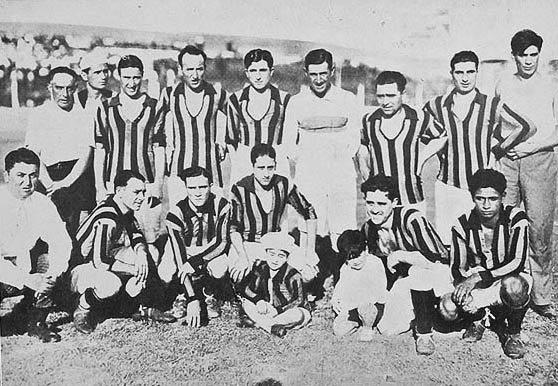
Nueva Chicago won its first title, Primera B championship, in 1930

The first time Chicago promoted to Primera División was in 1930, when winning the Primera B title after disputing a championship playoff with All Boys and Temperley. Chicago debuted in the Asociación Amateurs Argentina de Football (the amateur rival league of the professional Liga Argentina de Football) in 1931, playing there until 1935 when the LAF merged with the professional league, being all its teams relegated to second division. In 1932, Chicago played a relegation playoff with Sportivo Buenos Aires and Sportivo Palermo (which would be finally relegated to second division due to points average). One year later the team made a great campaign, finishing 2nd after champion Sportivo Dock Sud with only 3 losses over 19 matches played.

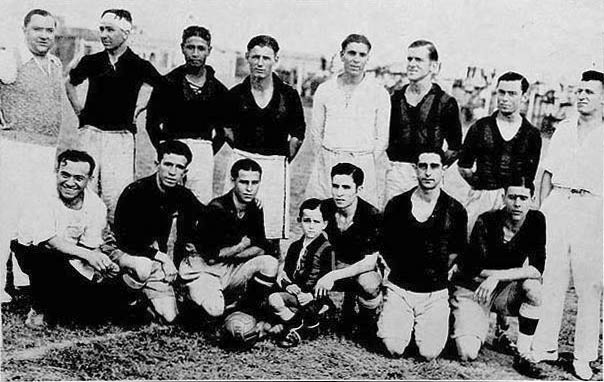
Nueva Chicago won its first first division title in 1933, the Copa Competencia Jockey Club

In 1933, Nueva Chicago won its first official title, the last edition of the Copa Competencia Jockey Club, a traditional national cup established 1907. The team made a great campaign, arriving to the final unbeaten with 3 matches won (to Estudiantes (BA), Sportivo Barracas and Sp. Buenos Aires) and 2 draws. Nueva Chicago won the title defeating Banfield by 1–0 at the final, played at Almagro stadium. The line-up was: Scali; Palacio, Diani; Mercado, Vivanco, Fernández; Berlanga, Noguera, Vargas, Gagliano, Sanabria.

In 1937, Nueva Chicago was relegated to the second division after Banfield defeated Excursionistas. Then president of the club Amadeo Cozza made an agreement with Sportivo Buenos Aires so the team hosted their home games at that stadium, then located in Almagro, Buenos Aires. By 1939, Nueva Chicago played its home games at All Boys stadium. That same year the club made the arrangements to get a new field where to build a stadium. The Municipality of Buenos Aires donated the club a land where a dump had operated. A group of club members and neighborhoods collaborated to level the playing field until it was in conditions to host games.

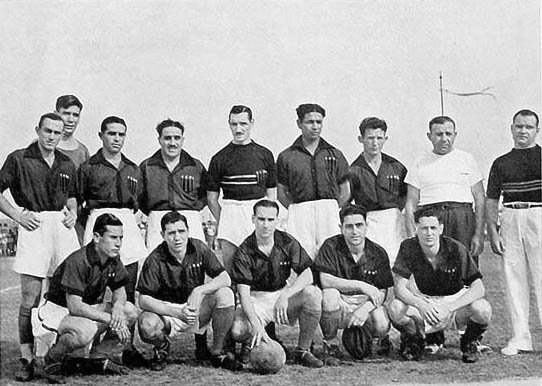
The team that won its second title, the Primera C championship in 1940

The stadium was inaugurated on 27 October 1940 vs. Sportivo Buenos Aires, which was defeated by 2–0. The team celebrated not only the victory but its second local title, the Primera C championship. Nueva Chicago has been playing at that stadium since then.

In 1966, Nueva Chicago was near to promote to Primera División but the team lost the final match to Deportivo Español, remaining in the second division. Nueva Chicago would not play in the top division of Argentine football until 1981, when it won its second Primera B title. The team played 22 matches, with 14 draws and 6 losses. Chicago also scored 66 goals and conceded 40. In Primera División, the team's highlight was an outstanding win against Boca Juniors by 5–0, on 2 November 1983. Despite this historic fact, the team was relegated at the end of the season.

Nueva Chicago remained in lower divisions until 1991 when the team promoted to Primera B Nacional defeating Gimnasia y Esgrima de Concepción del Uruguay at playoffs via penalty shoot-out (association football). In 2001, the squad promoted to Primera División for the second time in club's history after defeating Instituto de Córdoba 3–2 in the Estadio Chateau Carreras with an attendance of 12,000 fans that celebrated the goal scored by Oscar Gómez in the last minute of the match, after running 50 metres with the ball.

Nueva Chicago played in the top division of Argentine football until 2004 when it was relegated. The third promotion to Primera División was in 2006. At the end of the 2007 season and due to the poor campaign, Nueva Chicago had to play the "Promoción" (a relegation playoff consisting in two matches to determine which team would be remain in Primera) vs. Tigre. The first game was won by Tigre by 1–0. Next match was played on 25 June 2007. When Tigre was leading Nueva Chicago by 2–1 (and therefore sending it to Primera B Nacional) hundreds of Chicago's hooligans jumped into the field without being stopped by the police (although there were 200 police officers in the stadium), taking off the uniforms to players and then attacking Tigre's supporters which were peacefully celebrating their return to Primera División. The violent acts continued outside the stadium, where the hooligans of both teams clashed and a fan of Tigre, Marcelo Cejas, was hit by a brick and killed.

A month after the violent struggling, the Court of Discipline of the Argentine Football Association punished Nueva Chicago with the loss of 20 points for the 2007–08 Primera B Nacional tournament (although 18 points were finally deducted). Moreover, the Government of Argentina closed Chicago stadium for 20 fixtures, therefore the team could not play at its venue during all 2007–08 season and had to use other stadiums, mainly the Argentinos Juniors and Ferro Carril Oeste facilities.

Nueva Chicago totalized 52 points that finally were 34 (when the deduction of 18 points was applied), which forced the team to play the Promoción again, facing Los Andes. The team from Lomas de Zamora won both matches (1–0 and 2–0), relegating Nueva Chicago to Primera B Metropolitana, the third division of Argentine football.

In 2012, the club promoted to Primera B Nacional after a 1–1 draw to Chacarita Juniors at the relegation playoff final (the first game had been won by Nueva Chicago). although the team would be relegated next season, five fixtures before the end of the tournament. Nueva Chicago finished in the last position and was sent to Primera B Nacional along with Deportivo Merlo.

In May 2014, Nueva Chicago won its sixth official title to date, the 2013–14 Primera B Metropolitana after defeating Colegiales therefore returning to the Primera B Nacional.

== Players ==
=== Current squad ===
As of 4 January 2023

Note: Flags indicate national team as defined under FIFA eligibility rules; some limited exceptions apply. Players may hold more than one non-FIFA nationality.

No.	Pos.	Nation	Player
1	GK	ARG	Daniel Monllor (captain)
2	DF	ARG	Lucas Vesco
3	DF	ARG	Tobías Ostchega (on loan from Belgrano)
4	DF	ARG	Gustavo Mendoza
5	MF	ARG	Gaspar Vega
6	DF	ARG	Facundo Monteseirín
7	MF	ARG	Esteban Obregón (on loan from Estudiantes)
8	MF	ARG	Leonardo López
9	FW	ARG	Aaron Spetale (on loan from Estudiantes)
10	FW	ARG	Agustín Curruhinca (on loan from Huracán)
11	MF	ARG	Ezequiel Gallegos
12	GK	ARG	Facundo Ferrero (on loan from Sarmiento)
13	DF	ARG	Juan Manuel Fedorco
14	DF	ARG	Brayan Sosa
15	MF	ARG	Diego Mercado
16	DF	ARG	Julián Gauna
17	MF	ARG	Gastón Ada
18	MF	ARG	Matías Bergara

No.	Pos.	Nation	Player
19	FW	URU	Maximiliano Brito
20	FW	ARG	Ezequiel Naya (on loan from Estudiantes)
—	DF	ARG	Lautaro Amarilla
—	MF	PER	Gonzalo Aguirre
—	MF	ARG	Fabricio Brener (on loan from Belgrano)
—	MF	ARG	Franco Cáceres
—	GK	ARG	Juan Cruz Carranza
—	MF	ARG	Román Digión
—	FW	ARG	Gastón Espósito
—	MF	ARG	Gustavo Fernández
—	FW	ARG	Lautaro Ortega
—	FW	ARG	Catriel Quinteros
—	MF	ARG	Nahuel Rivero
—	MF	ARG	Tomás Rodríguez
—	MF	ARG	Luciano Romero
—	DF	ARG	José Tomino (on loan from Sarmiento)
—	FW	ARG	Ignacio Zanzi

=== Out on loan ===
As of 6 February 2023

Note: Flags indicate national team as defined under FIFA eligibility rules; some limited exceptions apply. Players may hold more than one non-FIFA nationality.

No.	Pos.	Nation	Player
—	MF	ARG	Lucas Goberville (at Ierapetra until 30 June 2023)
—	MF	ARG	Lucas López (at Barracas Central until 31 December 2023)
—	FW	ARG	Paul Charpentier (at Sportivo Luqueño until 31 December 2023)
—	FW	ARG	Aaron Martínez (at Berazategui until 31 December 2023)

== Titles ==
=== League ===
- Primera B Metropolitana (3): 1930, 1981, 2013–14
- Tercera División (1): 1940

=== National cups ===
- Copa de Competencia Jockey Club (1): 1933
