= List of Brazilian footballers in Serie B =

Football

The list of Brazilian footballers in Serie B records the association football players from Brazil who have appeared at least once for a team in the Italian Serie B. Entries in bold denote players still active in actual season.

== A ==
- Adaílton – Verona, Genoa, Bologna – 2002–08
- Adriano (Adriano Pereira da Silva) – Atalanta – 2005–06
- Adriano (Adriano Louzada) – Reggina – 2012–14
- Adryan – Brescia – 2022–23
- Aílton – Bari – 2001–02
- Aldair – Genoa – 2003–04
- Alemão – Vicenza, Varese – 2010–12
- Alfred – Salernitana – 2000–01
- Amarildo – Cesena – 1991–92
- Anderson – Venezia, Brescia, Ancona – 2002–06, 2008–09
- Robert Anderson – Genoa, Treviso – 2003–04, 2006–07
- Ângelo – Crotone, Lecce, Siena, Latina – 2006–08, 2009–10, 2013–15
- **Matias Antonini** – **Catanzaro** – 2023–
- Artur – Cesena – 2007–08
- **Paulo Azzi** – Cittadella, Spezia, **Modena**, Cagliari, Cremonese, Monza – 2013–14, 2015–16, 2022–23, 2024–

== B ==
- Babù – Salernitana, Venezia, Lecce, Verona, Triestina, Avellino – 2001–04, 2006–09
- Barreto – Treviso, Bari – 2003–05, 2007–09
- Bruno Bertinato – Venezia – 2022–24
- Fábio Bilica – Venezia, Palermo – 2000–01, 2002–03
- Binho – Empoli, Livorno – 1999–00, 2002–03
- Bondi – Salernitana, Arezzo, Grosseto – 2002–03, 2006–07, 2010–11
- Eric Botteghin – Ascoli, Modena – 2021–25
- Branco – Brescia – 1987–88
- Gabriel Brazão – SPAL – 2022–23
- Brenno – Bari – 2023–24

== C ==
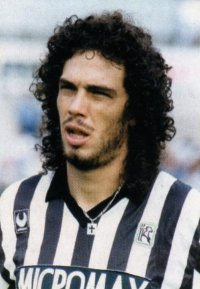
Walter Casagrande won the Serie B scorers ranking in 1990–91 season.

- Caetano – Frosinone, Crotone, Varese – 2009–14
- Caio Secco – Crotone – 2013–15
- Canè – Napoli, Bari – 1963–65, 1970–71
- Carlos Augusto – Monza – 2020–22
- Walter Casagrande – Ascoli – 1990–91
- Catê – Sampdoria – 1999–2000
- Mateus Cecchini Müller – Entella – 2020–21
- César – Catania, Chievo, Padova, Juve Stabia, Virtus Entella – 2004–06, 2007–08, 2009–12, 2014–15
- **Charlys** – Cosenza, Reggiana – 2024–
- Lucas Chiaretti – Cittadella, Foggia, Pordenone – 2016–20
- Claiton – Varese, Bari, Crotone, Cremonese – 2010–13, 2014–16, 2017–20
- Sergio Clerici – Lecco – 1962–66
- Igor Coronado – Trapani, Palermo – 2015–18
- Cribari – Empoli – 1999–2002
- Felipe Curcio – Brescia, Salernitana – 2017–21

== D ==
- Da Costa – Ancona, Sampdoria, Bologna – 2008–10, 2011–12, 2014–15
- Victor Da Silva – Pescara, Brescia – 2014–15
- William Da Silva – Verona – 2006–07
- Danilo – Parma – 2021–22
- Caio De Cenco – Trapani – 2015–17
- Marcos de Paula – Padova, Bari – 2010–12
- Rodrigo Defendi – Avellino – 2007–09
- Armando del Debbio – Lucchese – 1925–26
- Di Fabio – Cagliari – 2002–04
- Diego – Padova – 2009–10
- Digão – Rimini, Lecce, Crotone – 2005–07, 2009–10
- Diniz – Livorno – 2008–09
- Guilherme do Prado – Catania, Mantova, Perugia, Spezia, Cesena – 2002–03, 2004–05, 2007–08, 2009–10
- Doriva – Sampdoria – 1999–2000
- **Matheus Luz Priveato Dos Santos** – **Juve Stabia** – 2025–

== E ==
- Edmar – Pescara – 1989–91
- Edinho – Lecce – 2009–10
- Édson – Genoa – 1997–98
- Eloi – Genoa – 1984–85
- Rodrigo Ely – Reggina, Varese, Avellino – 2012–15
- Emerson – Reggina, Livorno – 2011–13, 2014–15
- Alan Empereur – Livorno, Salernitana, Foggia, Bari, Verona – 2014–16, 2017–19

== F ==
- Fabiano (Fabiano Lima Rodrigues) – Arezzo, Genoa, Vicenza – 2005–07, 2009–10
- Fabiano (Fabiano Medina da Silva) – Lecce – 2007–08, 2009–10
- Fabinho – Modena, Perugia – 2011–12, 2014–15
- Diego Farias – Nocerina, Padova, Cagliari, Benevento – 2011–13, 2015–16, 2021–23
- Faustinho – Palermo – 1964–65
- Fernando (José Ferdinando Puglia) – Bari – 1964–65
- Adriano Ferreira Pinto – Perugia, Cesena, Atalanta, Varese – 2004–06, 2010–11, 2012–14
- Filipe – Varese – 2011–13
- Lucas Finazzi – Brescia – 2012–14

== G ==
- Denilson Gabionetta – Pisa, Albinoleffe, Crotone, Torino, Salernitana – 2007–13, 2015–16
- Gabriel (Gabriel Appelt Pires) – Pro Vercelli, Spezia, Pescara – 2012–15
- Gabriel (Gabriel Vasconcelos Ferreira) – Carpi, Empoli, Perugia, Lecce – 2014–15, 2017–19, 2020–22
- Gilberto – Latina – 2016–17
- Gladestony – Pro Vercelli – 2017–18
- Gladstone – Verona – 2005–06
- Gelson – Pistoiese – 2001–02
- Gleison Santos – Atalanta, Albinoleffe, Reggina – 2003–04, 2006–07, 2009–10
- Goliardo Gelardi – Padova – 1934–35
- Leandro Gobatto – Piacenza – 2006–07
- Leandro Guerreiro – Salernitana, Pescara – 2003–05
- Rodrigo Guth – Pescara – 2020–21

== H ==
- **Hernani** – Reggina, Parma, Monza, **Palermo** – 2022–24, 2025–
- Humberto – Torino – 2004–05

== J ==
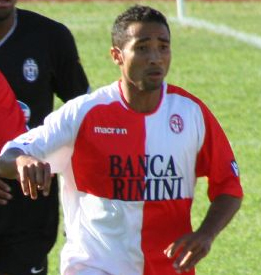
Jeda is the second most capped Brazilian player and the second best foreign goalscorers in Serie B.

- Jeda – Vicenza, Siena, Palermo, Piacenza, Catania, Crotone, Rimini – 2001–08
- Jéffe – Frosinone, Latina, Livorno – 2009–10, 2013–16
- Jefferson – Modena – 2011–12
- João Paulo – Bari – 1992–94
- Joelson – Albinoleffe, Pisa, Reggina, Grosseto – 2004–07, 2008–10
- Jonathas – Brescia, Latina – 2011–12, 2013–14
- Juliano – Lecce, Pisa – 2006–08

== L ==
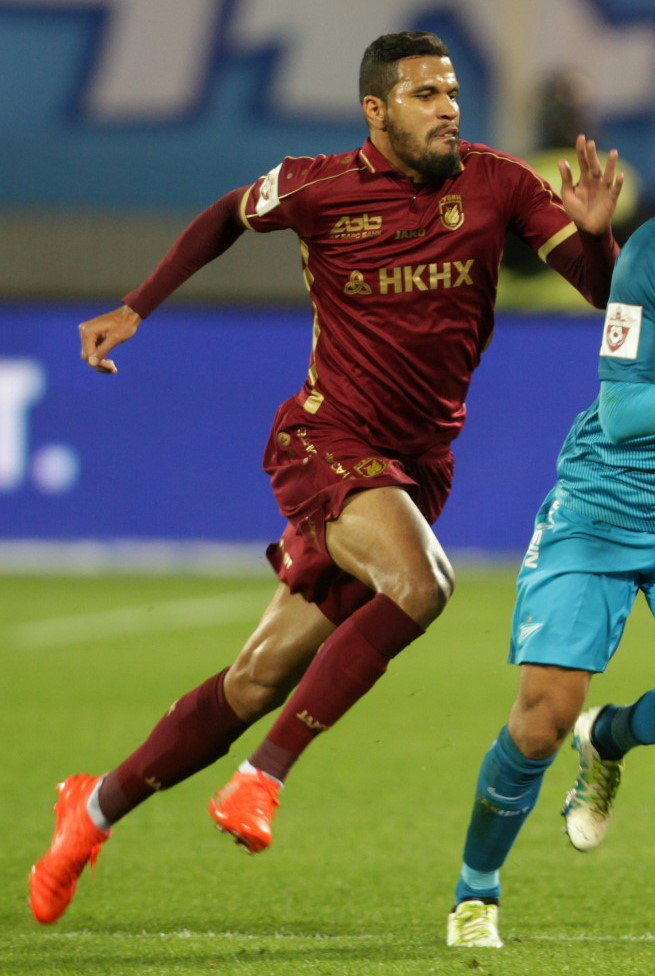
Jonathas is the top scorer of Latina in Serie B.

- Francisco Lima – Brescia – 2006–08
- **Lucas Felippe** – **Entella** – 2026–
- Luciano – Chievo – 2000–01, 2007–08
- **Mateus Lusuardi** – Frosinone, Reggiana – 2024–
- Luvanor – Catania – 1984–86

== M ==
- Filipe Machado – Salernitana – 2009–10
- Maicon – Reggina, Livorno – 2011–12, 2013–16, 2018–19
- Marcelinho – Catania – 2014–15
- Mancini – Venezia – 2002–03
- Marco Aurélio – Vicenza, Palermo, Cosenza – 1999–2000, 2001–03
- Marcón – Venezia – 2002–03
- Martinho – Verona, Catania, Bari, Ascoli – 2012–13, 2014–15, 2016–19
- Ryder Matos – Verona, Empoli, Perugia – 2018–19, 2020–23
- Matuzalém – Napoli, Bologna – 1999–2000, 2014–15
- Fernando Menegazzo – Catania – 2004–05
- Junior Messias – Crotone – 2019–20
- Mezavilla – Catania, Cesena, Pisa, Juve Stabia – 2004–05, 2006–08, 2011–13, 2019–20
- Milton – Como – 1989–90
- Montresor – Treviso – 2006–07
- Mozart – Reggina – 2001–02
- Müller – Torino – 1989–90
- Murilo – Livorno – 2018–20

== N ==
- Nenê – Spezia, Bari – 2014–18
- Neto Pereira – Varese – 2010–15
- Nícolas – Verona, Lanciano, Trapani, Reggina, Pisa – 2012–13, 2014–17, 2020–25

== O ==
- Oliveira – Cittadella, Vicenza – 2008–11

== P ==
- Paco Soares – Fidelis Andria – 1997–98
- Paquito – Ravenna, Cosenza, Crotone – 2000–02, 2005–06
- Paulinho – Grosseto, Livorno, Cremonese – 2007–09, 2011–13, 2017–19
- Pedrinho – Catania – 1984–86
- Pelado – Treviso – 1999–01
- Luís Atílio Pennacchi – Lucchese – 1939–41
- Paulo Pereira – Genoa – 1996–98
- Inácio Piá – Ascoli, Napoli, Treviso, Torino, Portogruaro – 2003–04, 2006–08, 2009–11
- Guglielmo Piantoni – Palermo – 1931–32
- Pinga – Torino, Siena – 2000–05

== R ==
- Rafael – Verona, Cagliari – 2011–13, 2015–16
- Reginaldo – Treviso, Parma, Siena, Pro Vercelli – 2003–05, 2008–09, 2010–11, 2017–18
- Renan – Sampdoria – 2011–12
- Rincon – Ancona, Piacenza, Grosseto – 2008–11
- Romeu – Ravenna – 1999–2000
- Ronaldo Pompeu – Mantova, Padova, Grosseto, Empoli, Pro Vercelli, Salernitana, Novara – 2009–18
- Rubinho – Genoa, Torino – 2006–07, 2010–11

== S ==
- Vítor Saba – Brescia – 2012–14
- Luís Gabriel Sacilotto – Cesena, Nocerina – 2006–08, 2011–12
- César Augusto Sant'Anna – Crotone – 2000–01
- Bruno Siciliano – Bari – 1964–65
- **Jonathan Silva** – Padova, **Mantova** – 2025–
- Guilherme Siqueira – Ancona – 2008–09
- Sodinha – Bari, Brescia, Trapani – 2008–09, 2012–16
- **Stênio** – **Modena** – 2026–
- **Gabriel Strefezza** – SPAL, Cremonese, Lecce, Como, **Palermo** – 2016–17, 2018–19, 2020–22, 2023–24, 2026–

== T ==
- Rodrigo Taddei – Siena, Perugia – 2002–03, 2014–15
- Teco – Salernitana – 2002–03
- Tesser – Lecce – 2006–07
- Thiago – Genoa – 2003–05
- Thomas – Siena – 2013–14
- Tita – Pescara – 1989–90
- Rômulo Eugênio Togni – Arezzo, Pescara, Avellino – 2006–07, 2011–12, 2013–14
- Robson Toledo – Ascoli, Ravenna, Triestina – 2004–05, 2007–08, 2010–11

== V ==
- Vanderson – Treviso – 2008–09
- Ronaldo Vanin – Catanzaro – 2005–06
- Vincente – Treviso, Padova – 2008–09, 2010–11
- Vinícius – Padova, Perugia – 2013–15

== W ==
- Wágner – Modena – 2010–11
- William (Justino Clovis William) – Ascoli – 2008–09
- William (William Nascimento Lacerda) – Modena – 2012–13
- Wilker – Treviso – 2006–07, 2008–09

== Z ==
- Adrián Zanettin – Verona – 1935–36
- Zé Elias – Genoa – 2003–04
- Zé Eduardo – Empoli, Padova – 2011–13

== See also ==
- List of foreign Serie B players
- List of Brazilian footballers in Serie A

== Notes ==
1. Capped for the Italy national under-20 football team
2. Capped for the Italy national under-19 football team
