= List of Brazilian footballers in Serie A =

Listed are all the Brazilian players that have appeared at least once for a team in Italy's Serie A. In Bold are the players still active in current season and their teams for this.

== A ==
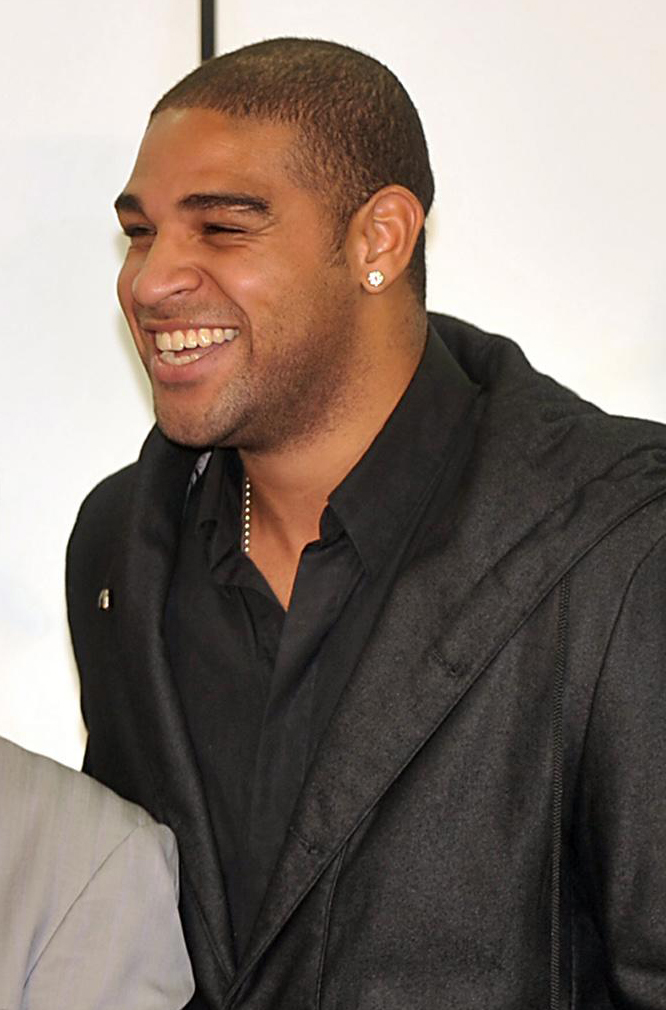
Adriano Leite Ribeiro

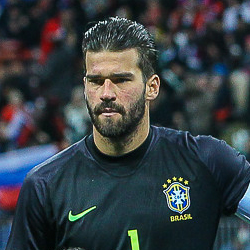
Alisson Becker

- Adaílton – Parma, Verona, Bologna – 1997–98, 1999–2002, 2008–10
- Adriano (Adriano Leite Ribeiro) – Inter, Fiorentina, Parma, Roma – 2001–09, 2010–11
- Adriano (Adriano Pereira da Silva) – Palermo, Atalanta – 2004–05, 2006–08
- Adryan – Cagliari – 2013–14
- Alberto – Udinese, Siena – 1999–2008
- Aldair – Roma – 1990–2003
- Alemão – Napoli, Atalanta – 1988–94
- Alex – Milan – 2014–16
- Alex Sandro – Juventus – 2015–24
- Alisson – Roma – 2017–18
- Allan – Udinese, Napoli – 2012–20
- Almir – Genoa – 1962–63
- Yeso Amalfi – Torino – 1951–52
- Amaral – Parma, Fiorentina – 1996–97, 2000–02
- Amarildo (Amarildo Souza do Amaral) – Lazio, Cesena – 1989–91
- Amarildo (Amarildo Tavares da Silveira) – Milan, Fiorentina, Roma – 1963–72
- **Alex Amorim** – **Genoa** – 2025–
- Amoroso – Udinese, Parma, Milan – 1996–2001, 2005–06
- Anderson (Anderson Luís de Abreu Oliveira) – Fiorentina – 2013–14
- Anderson (Anderson Robert Cavalheiro) – Como, Treviso – 2002–03, 2005–06
- Andrade – Roma – 1988–89
- Ângelo – Lecce, Parma, Siena – 2004–06, 2008–09, 2010–13
- Anselmo – Genoa, Palermo – 2012–13
- Antoninho – Fiorentina – 1960–61
- Guilherme Arana – Atalanta – 2019–20
- Vicente Arnoni – Milan – 1935–38
- Arthur – Juventus, Fiorentina – 2020–22, 2023–24
- Artur Moraes – Roma – 2008–10
- Marcos Assunção – Roma – 1999–2002
- Athirson – Juventus – 2000–01
- Danilo Avelar – Cagliari, Torino – 2012–17
- Paulo Azzi – Cagliari – 2023–25

== B ==
- Babú – Lecce, Catania – 2004–06, 2007–08
- Júlio Baptista – Roma – 2008–11
- Amilcar Barbuy – Lazio – 1931–32
- Barreto – Udinese, Bari, Torino – 2005–07, 2009–15
- Josias Basso – Reggina – 2008–09
- Michel Bastos – Roma – 2013–14
- Batista – Lazio, Avellino – 1983–86
- Roberto José Battaglia – Catania, Atalanta – 1962–65
- Rodrigo Becão – Udinese – 2019–23
- Benedicto – Torino, Lazio – 1933–39
- Demostene Bertini – Torino, Sampdoria – 1932–36
- Beto – Napoli – 1996–97
- Carlos Alberto "Careca" Bianchezi – Atalanta – 1991–92
- Fábio Bilica – Venezia, Brescia, Ancona – 1998–2000, 2001–04
- Binho – Empoli – 1997–99
- Renato Bondi – Messina – 2005–06
- Branco – Brescia, Genoa – 1986–87, 1990–93
- **Bremer** – Torino, **Juventus** – 2018–
- Brenner – Udinese – 2023–25
- Bruno Henrique – Palermo – 2016–17
- Bruno Peres – Torino, Roma – 2014–18, 2019–21

== C ==
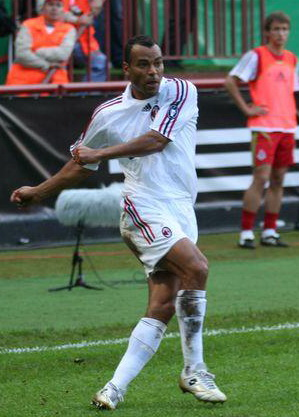
Cafu

- Arthur Cabral – Fiorentina – 2021–23
- Caetano – Siena – 2007–08
- Cafu – Roma, Milan – 1997–2008
- Caio Rangel – Cagliari – 2014–15
- Caio Ribeiro – Inter, Napoli – 1995–97
- Antonio Roberto Camatta – Venezia – 1962–63
- Gustavo Campanharo – Verona – 2014–15
- Heitor Canalli – Torino – 1933–34
- Cané – Napoli, Bari – 1962–63, 1965–70, 1972–75
- Luan Capanni – Lazio – 2018–19
- Careca – Napoli – 1987–93
- Carlão – Torino – 2016–17
- **Carlos Augusto** – Monza, **Inter** – 2022–
- Carlos de Souza – SPAL – 1962–64
- **Diego Carlos** – Como, **Parma** – 2025–
- Roberto Carlos – Inter – 1995–96
- Roger Carvalho – Genoa, Bologna – 2011–13
- Walter Casagrande – Ascoli, Torino – 1987–90, 1991–93
- Leandro Castán – Roma, Torino, Cagliari – 2012–18
- José Castelli – Lazio – 1931–34
- Catê – Sampdoria – 1998–99
- Toninho Cerezo – Roma, Sampdoria – 1983–92
- César (César Aparecido Rodrigues) – Lazio, Inter, Livorno, Bologna – 2001–09
- César (César Vinicio Cervo de Luca) – Chievo, Catania – 2003–05, 2006–07, 2008–09
- Charlys – Verona – 2023–24
- China – Sampdoria, Roma, Vicenza, Mantova – 1962–68
- Chinesinho – Modena, Catania, Juventus, Vicenza – 1962–72
- Cicinho – Roma – 2007–12
- Claiton – Bologna, Chievo, Crotone – 2000–01, 2013–14, 2016–17
- Sérgio Clerici – Lecco, Bologna, Atalanta, Verona, Fiorentina, Napoli, Lazio – 1960–62, 1966–78
- Coelho – Bologna – 2008–09
- Leonardo Colella – Juventus – 1955–56
- Philippe Coutinho – Inter – 2010–13
- **Yan Couto** – **Como** – 2026–
- Emílson Cribari – Empoli, Udinese, Lazio, Siena, Napoli – 2002–11
- André Cruz – Napoli, Milan, Torino – 1994–2000
- Felipe Curcio – Brescia – 2019–20
- Davide Curte – Genoa – 1947–48

== D ==
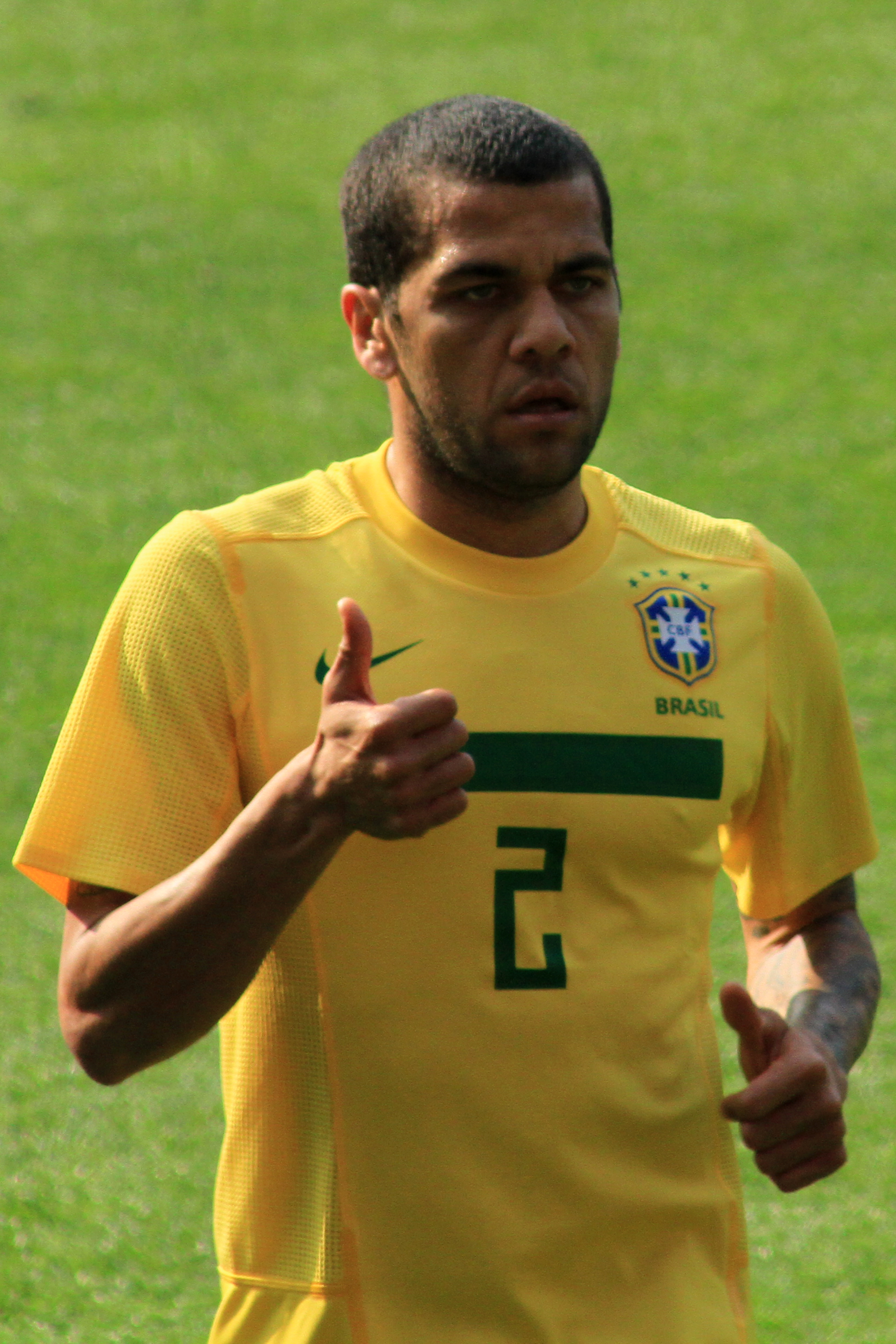
Dani Alves

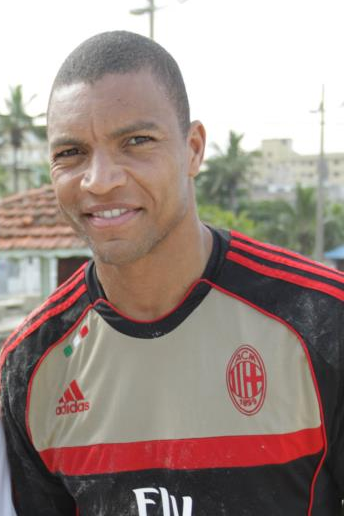
Dida

- Da Costa – Sampdoria, Bologna – 2010–11, 2012–14, 2015–18, 2019–21
- Da Silva (Victor da Silva) – Chievo – 2012–13
- Dalbert – Inter, Fiorentina, Cagliari – 2017–20, 2021–22
- Dani Alves – Juventus – 2016–17
- Danilo (Danilo Larangeira) – Udinese, Bologna – 2011–21
- Danilo (Danilo Luiz da Silva) – Juventus – 2019–25
- Danilo Sacramento – Genoa – 2007–08
- Rodrigo Defendi – Udinese – 2005–06
- Armando del Debbio – Lazio – 1931–35
- Emanuele del Vecchio – Verona, Napoli, Padova, Milan – 1957–63
- Alexandre De Maria – Lazio – 1931–35
- Marcos de Paula – Chievo – 2002–03, 2009–11
- André Dias – Lazio – 2009–14
- Dida – Milan – 2000–01, 2002–10
- Dido – Spal – 1955–57
- Diego – Juventus – 2009–10
- Digão – Milan – 2007–08
- Marcus Diniz – Livorno – 2009–10
- Mario Di Pietro – Genoa – 1955–56
- Dirceu – Verona, Napoli, Ascoli, Como, Avellino – 1982–87
- **Dodô (Domilson Cordeiro dos Santos)** – **Fiorentina** – 2022–
- Dodô (José Rodolfo Pires Ribeiro) – Roma, Inter, Sampdoria – 2012–17
- Doni – Roma – 2005–11
- Guilherme do Prado – Perugia – 2003–04
- Doriva – Sampdoria – 1998–99
- Douglas Costa – Juventus – 2017–21
- **Douglas Luiz** – **Juventus** – 2024–25, 2026–
- Douglas Santos – Udinese – 2013–14
- Léo Duarte – Milan – 2019–21
- Dunga – Pisa, Fiorentina, Pescara – 1987–93

== E ==
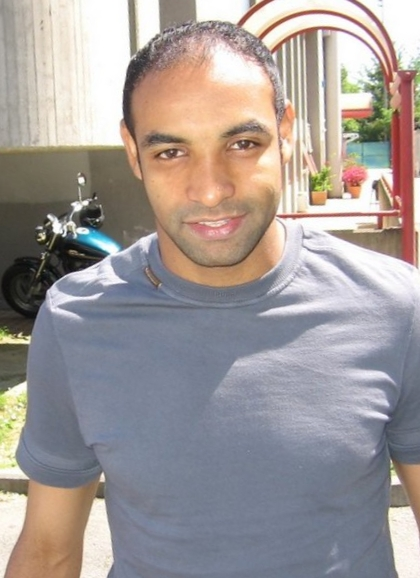
Emerson Ferreira da Rosa

- Edenílson – Genoa, Udinese – 2014–17
- Ederson (Ederson Honorato Campos) – Lazio – 2012–15
- **Éderson (Éderson José dos Santos Lourenço da Silva)** – Salernitana, **Atalanta** – 2021–
- Edimar – Chievo – 2014–15
- Edinho (Edimo Ferreira Campos) – Lecce – 2008–09
- Edinho (Edino Nazareth Filho) – Udinese – 1982–87
- Edmar – Pescara – 1988–89
- Edmundo – Fiorentina, Napoli – 1997–99, 2000–01
- Edu – Torino – 1988–89
- Eduardo Henrique – Crotone – 2020–21
- Eloi – Genoa – 1983–84
- Rodrigo Ely – Milan – 2015–16
- Emerson (Emerson Ferreira da Rosa) – Roma, Juventus, Milan – 2000–06, 2007–09
- Emerson (Emerson Pereira da Silva) – Perugia – 1998–99
- Emerson (Emerson Ramos Borges) – Livorno – 2013–14
- Alan Empereur – Verona – 2019–21
- Enéas – Bologna – 1980–81
- Evair – Atalanta – 1988–91
- Lucas Evangelista – Udinese – 2014–15, 2016–17
- Everton Luiz – SPAL – 2017–19
- Ewandro – Udinese – 2016–17

== F ==
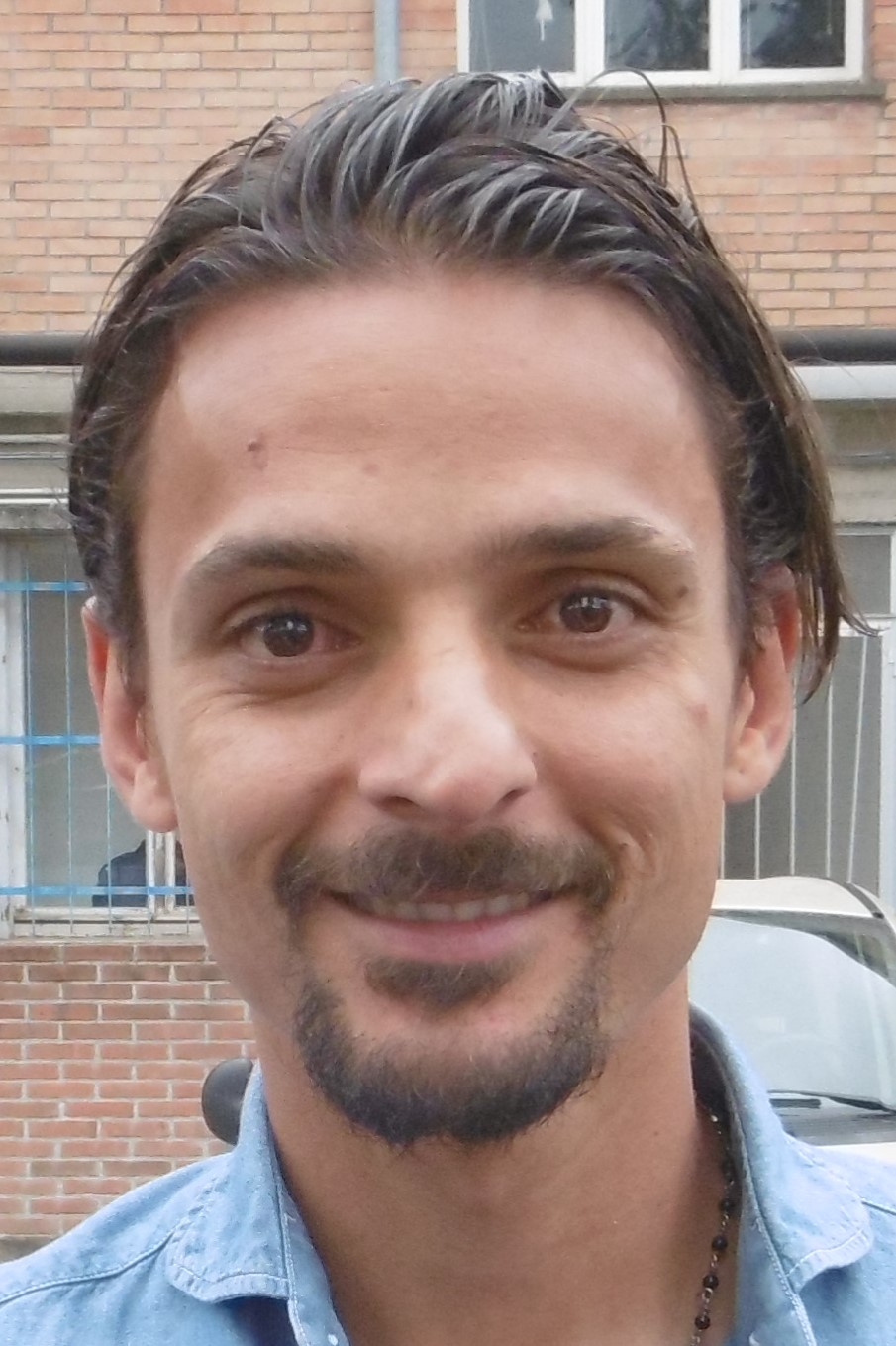
Felipe is one of the most capped foreign players with 376 appearances.

- Fabiano (Fabiano Lima Rodrigues) – Perugia, Genoa – 2003–04, 2007–08
- Fabiano (Fabiano Medina da Silva) – Lecce – 2008–09, 2010–11
- Fábio Júnior – Roma – 1998–2000
- Falcão – Roma – 1980–85
- Orlando Fantoni – Lazio – 1947–48
- Diego Farias – Sassuolo, Cagliari, Empoli, Lecce, Spezia – 2013–15, 2016–22
- Faustinho – Palermo – 1962–63
- Felipe – Udinese, Fiorentina, Cesena, Siena, Parma, Inter, SPAL – 2002–20
- Felipe Anderson – Lazio – 2013–18, 2021–24
- Lucas Felippe – Verona – 2019–20
- Fernandinho – Verona – 2014–15
- Fernando (Fernando Giudicelli) – Torino – 1931–33
- Fernando (Fernando Lucas Martins) – Sampdoria – 2015–16
- Fernando (José Ferdinando Puglia) – Palermo, Bari – 1961–64
- Adriano Ferreira Pinto – Atalanta – 2006–10, 2011–12
- Filipe – Roma – 2008–09
- Daniel Fuzato – Roma – 2019–21

== G ==
- Gabriel (Gabriel Barbosa Almeida) – Inter – 2016–17
- Gabriel (Gabriel Vasconcelos Ferreira) – Milan, Napoli, Cagliari, Lecce – 2013–14, 2015–17, 2019–20
- Gabriel Silva – Novara, Udinese, Carpi, Genoa – 2011–17
- Gaúcho Toffoli – Lecce – 1993–94
- Goliardo Gelardi – Napoli – 1933–34
- Geovani – Bologna – 1989–90
- Germano – Milan, Genoa – 1962–63
- Gérson (Gerson Candido de Paula) – Bari, Lecce – 1989–91, 1993–96
- Gerson (Gerson Santos da Silva) – Roma, Fiorentina – 2016–19
- Gilberto (Gilberto da Silva Melo) – Inter – 1998–99
- Gilberto (Gilberto Moraes Junior) – Fiorentina, Verona – 2015–16
- **Giovane** – Verona, **Napoli** – 2025–
- Gleison Santos – Genoa, Reggina – 2007–09
- Guilherme (Costa Marques) – Benevento – 2017–18
- Gustavo (Gustavo Franchin Schiavolin) – Lecce – 2010–11
- Gustavo (Gustavo Lazzaretti de Araújo) – Udinese, Treviso – 2004–06

== H ==
- Henrique (Henrique Adriano Buss) – Napoli – 2013–15
- Henrique (Henrique Matheus de Souza) – Sassuolo – 2021–24
- Hernanes – Lazio, Inter, Juventus – 2010–17
- Hernani – Parma, Genoa – 2019–22, 2024–26
- Higo – Chievo – 2003–04

== I ==
- Roger Ibañez – Atalanta, Roma – 2018–23
- Ibson – Bologna – 2013–14
- Igor – SPAL, Fiorentina – 2019–23
- Isaac – Verona – 2025–26

== J ==
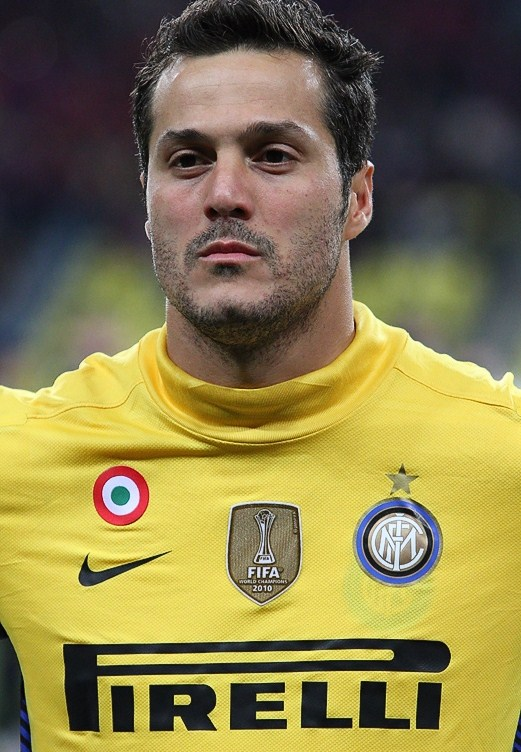
Júlio César

- Jadson – Udinese – 2013–14
- Jair – Inter, Roma – 1962–72
- Jandrei – Genoa – 2018–19
- Mário Jardel – Ancona – 2003–04
- Jeda – Vicenza, Cagliari, Lecce, Novara – 2000–01, 2007–12
- João Paulo – Bari – 1989–92
- Joelson – Reggina – 2007–08
- Jonathan – Inter, Parma – 2011–15
- Jonathas – Brescia, Pescara, Torino – 2010–11, 2012–13
- Jorginho (Jorginho Paulista)– Udinese – 1999–2000
- Juan – Roma – 2007–12
- **Juan Jesus** – Inter, Roma, Napoli, **Venezia** – 2011–
- Juárez – Lecce, Como, Siena, Bologna, Udinese – 1999–2006
- Juary – Avellino, Inter, Ascoli, Cremonese – 1980–85
- Julinho – Fiorentina – 1955–58
- Júlio César (Júlio César da Silva) – Juventus – 1990–94
- Júlio César (Júlio César Santos Correa) – Milan – 2000–01
- Júlio César (Júlio César Soares de Espíndola) – Inter – 2005–12
- Júlio Sérgio – Roma, Lecce – 2009–12
- Júnior (Leovegildo Lins da Gama Júnior) – Torino, Pescara – 1984–89
- Júnior (Jenílson Ângelo de Souza) – Parma, Siena – 2000–04

== K ==
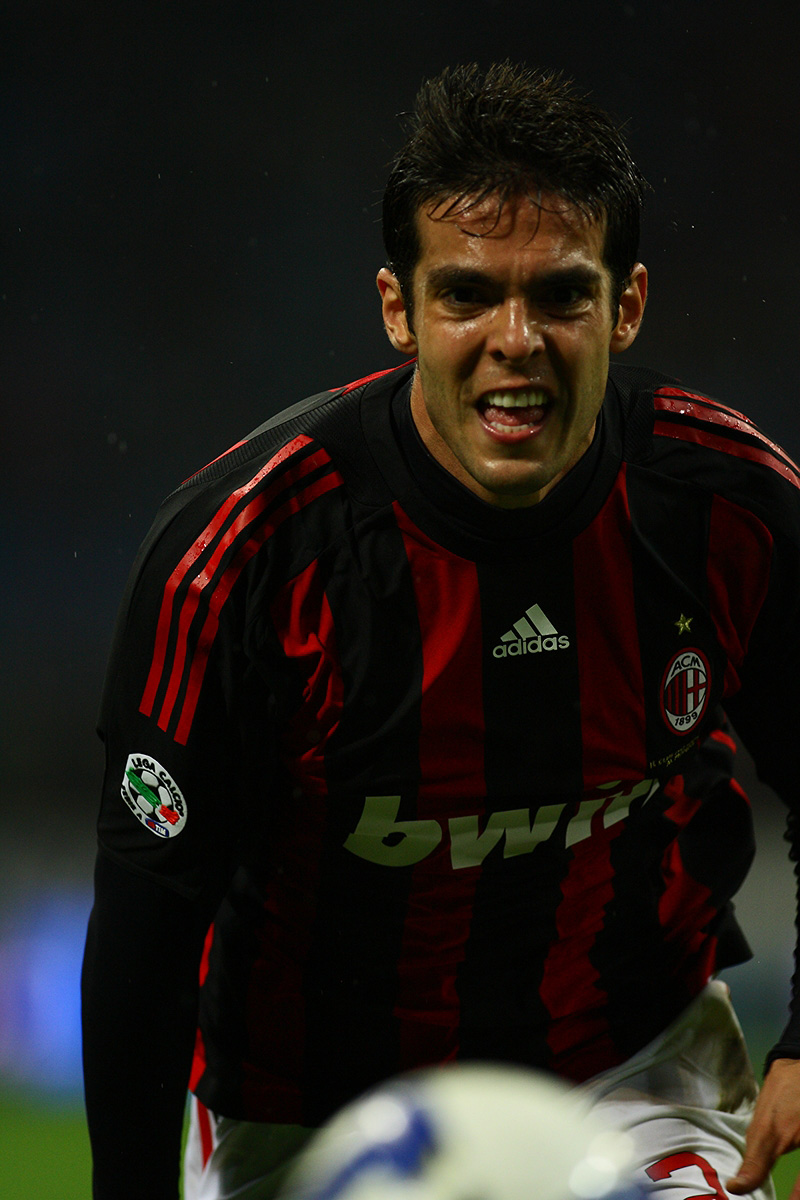
Kaká

- **Bruno Kaiki** – **Como** – 2026–
- Kaio Jorge – Juventus, Frosinone – 2021–22, 2023–24
- Kaká – Milan – 2003–09, 2013–14
- Keirrison – Fiorentina – 2009–10
- Kerlon – Chievo – 2008–09

== L ==
- Bruno Lança – Reggina – 2005–06
- Leandro – Fiorentina – 2000–02
- Lucas Leiva – Lazio – 2017–22
- Leonardo – Milan – 1997–2001, 2002–03
- Francisco Lima – Lecce, Bologna, Roma – 1999–2004
- Lorran – Pisa – 2025–26
- Lucas Souza – Parma – 2014–15
- Luciano – Bologna, Chievo Verona, Inter – 1998–2000, 2001–07, 2008–13
- Lúcio – Inter, Juventus – 2009–13
- **Luis Henrique** – **Inter** – 2025–
- Luís Sílvio Danuello – Pistoiese – 1980–81
- Luiz Adriano – Milan – 2015–17
- Mateus Lusuardi – Frosinone, Pisa – 2023–24, 2025–26
- Luvanor – Catania – 1983–84
- Lyanco – Torino, Bologna – 2017–21

== M ==
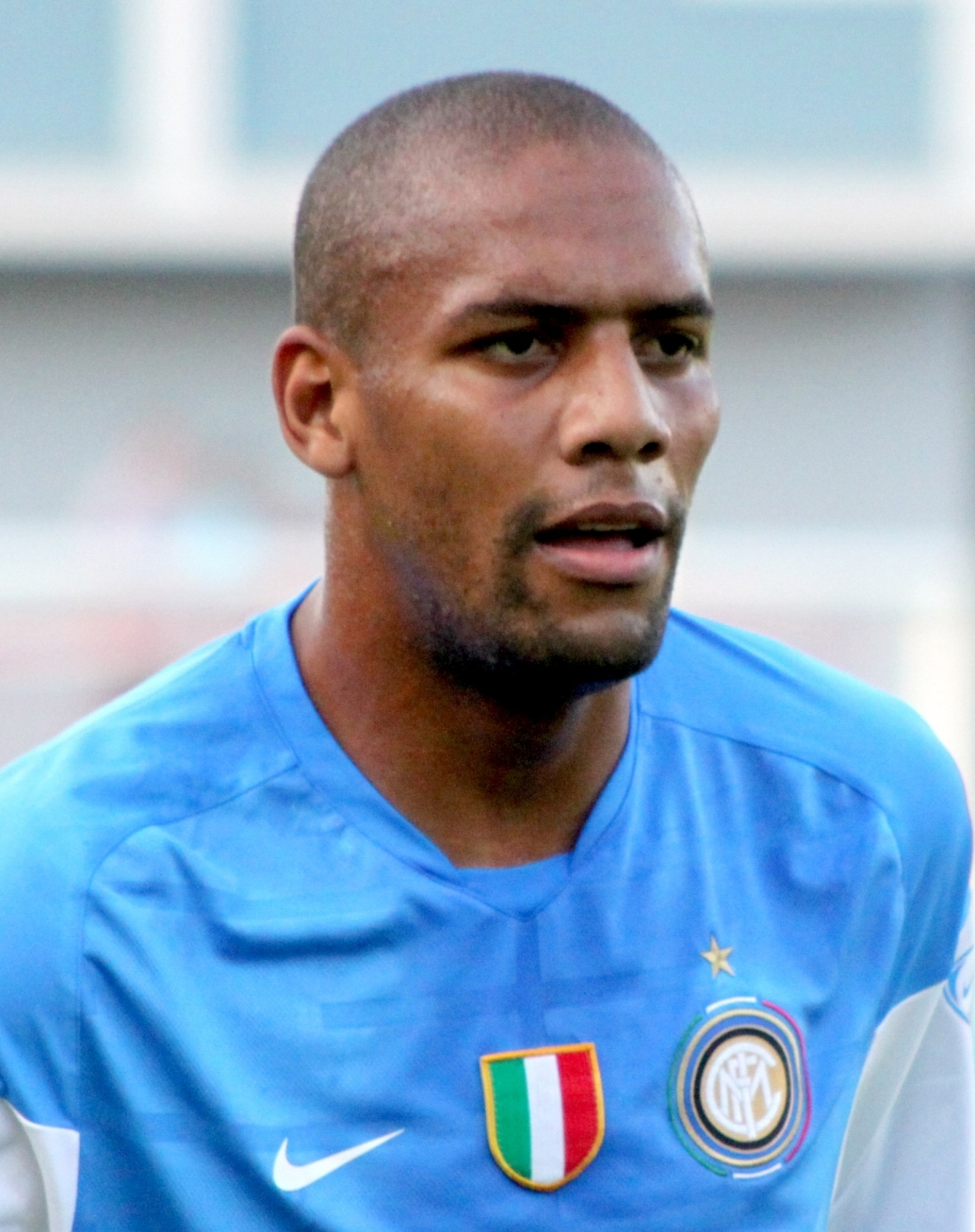
Maicon

- Maicon – Inter, Roma – 2006–12, 2013–16
- Maicosuel – Udinese – 2012–14
- Mancini – Roma, Inter, Milan – 2003–11
- Marcão – Torino – 1994–95
- Marco Aurélio – Vicenza – 1998–99, 2000–01
- Marcos Antônio – Lazio – 2022–23
- Marcos Paulo – Udinese – 2001–02
- Marlon – Sassuolo, Monza – 2018–21, 2022–23
- Rafael Marques – Verona – 2013–15
- Marquinho – Roma, Verona, Udinese – 2011–14, 2015–16
- Marquinhos – Roma – 2012–13
- Raphael Martinho – Catania, Cesena, Verona, Carpi – 2010–12, 2013–14, 2015–16
- Ryder Matos – Fiorentina, Carpi, Udinese, Verona – 2013–14, 2015–18, 2020–21
- Felipe Mattioni – Milan – 2008–09
- Matuzalém – Napoli, Piacenza, Brescia, Lazio, Genoa, Verona – 2000–04, 2008–14, 2015–16
- Maurício – Lazio – 2014–16, 2017–18
- Maxwell – Inter – 2006–09
- Mazinho – Lecce, Fiorentina – 1990–92
- Felipe Melo – Fiorentina, Juventus, Inter – 2008–11, 2015–17
- Fernando Menegazzo – Siena – 2003–05
- **Junior Messias** – Crotone, Milan, **Genoa** – 2020–
- Mikael – Salernitana – 2021–22
- Milton – Como – 1988–89
- Armando Miranda – Juventus, Catania – 1962–64
- Miranda (João Miranda de Souza Filho) – Inter – 2015–19
- Mozart – Reggina, Livorno – 2000–01, 2002–05, 2009–10
- Müller – Torino, Perugia – 1988–89, 1990–91, 1996–97
- Américo Murolo – Vicenza – 1955–56

== N ==
- Naldo – Bologna, Udinese – 2012–14
- Natan – Napoli – 2023–24
- Nelsinho – Mantova – 1961–62
- Nenê (Ânderson Miguel da Silva) – Cagliari, Verona – 2009–15
- Nené (Claudio Olinto de Carvalho) – Juventus, Cagliari – 1963–76
- **David Neres** – **Napoli** – 2024–
- Neto – Fiorentina, Juventus – 2011–17
- Neuton – Udinese – 2011–12
- Nícolas – Verona, Udinese, Pisa – 2013–14, 2017–18, 2020–21, 2025–26
- Niginho – Lazio – 1930–35
- Ninão – Lazio – 1930–35

== O ==
- Ricardo Oliveira – Milan – 2006–07
- Orlando – Udinese – 1981–82

== P ==
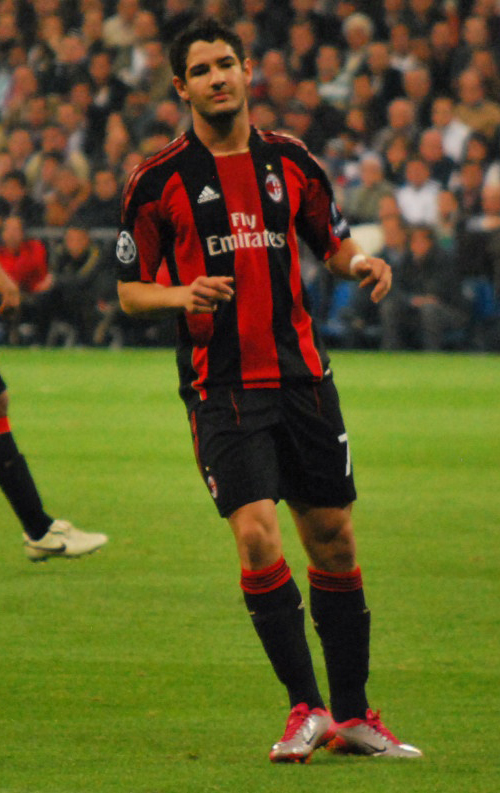
Alexandre Pato

- Packer – Siena – 2005–06, 2008–09
- Paco Soares – Sampdoria – 1997–98
- Lucas Paquetá – Milan – 2018–20
- Lucas Piazon – Chievo – 2018–19
- Alexandre Pato – Milan – 2007–13
- Paulinho – Livorno – 2004–07, 2013–14
- Paulo Sérgio – Roma – 1997–99
- Pedrinho – Catania – 1983–84
- Pedro – Fiorentina – 2019–20
- Pedro Felipe – Sassuolo – 2025–26
- Andreas Pereira – Lazio – 2020–21
- Matheus Pereira – Empoli, Juventus – 2016–17, 2018–19
- **Lucas Perri** – **Torino** – 2026–
- Inácio Piá – Atalanta, Catania, Napoli – 2001–03, 2004–05, 2007–10
- Guglielmo Piantoni – Torino, Palermo – 1929–31, 1932–33
- Pinga – Torino, Treviso – 1999–2000, 2001–02, 2005–06
- César Prates – Livorno, Chievo – 2005–07

== R ==
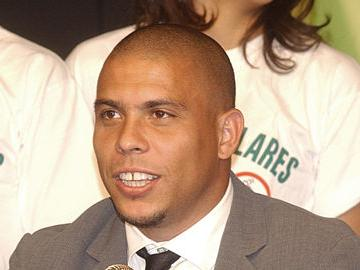
Ronaldo Luiz Nazário da Lima

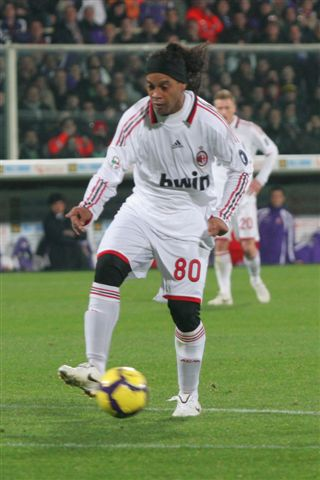
Ronaldinho

- Rafael (Rafael Bittencourt de Andrade) – Verona, Cagliari, Spezia – 2013–18, 2019–21
- Rafael (Rafael Cabral Barbosa) – Napoli, Sampdoria – 2013–15, 2016–17, 2018–19
- Rafael (Rafael Pereira da Silva) – Messina – 2004–06
- Rafinha (Márcio Rafael Ferreira de Souza) – Genoa – 2010–11
- Rafinha (Rafael Alcântara do Nascimento) – Inter – 2017–18
- Gaetano Ragusa – Napoli – 1933–34
- Reginaldo – Treviso, Fiorentina, Parma, Siena – 2005–08, 2009–10, 2011–12
- Reinaldo – Verona – 1996–97
- Reinier – Frosinone – 2023–24
- Renan – Sampdoria – 2012–14
- Renato Portalupi – Roma – 1988–89
- Thiago Ribeiro – Cagliari – 2011–13
- Rivaldo – Milan – 2002–03
- Pedro Rizzetti – Lazio – 1931–34
- Robinho – Milan – 2010–14
- **Robinho Júnior** – **Genoa** – 2026–
- Rogério – Sassuolo – 2017–23
- Ronaldinho – Milan – 2008–11
- Ronaldo (Ronaldo Luiz Nazario da Lima) – Inter, Milan – 1997–2000, 2001–02, 2006–08
- Ronaldo (Ronaldo Pompeu da Silva) – Empoli – 2015–16
- Roque Júnior – Milan, Siena – 2000–04
- Emerson Royal – Milan – 2024–25
- Rubinho – Genoa, Palermo, Livorno, Juventus – 2007–10, 2012–14, 2016–17

== S ==
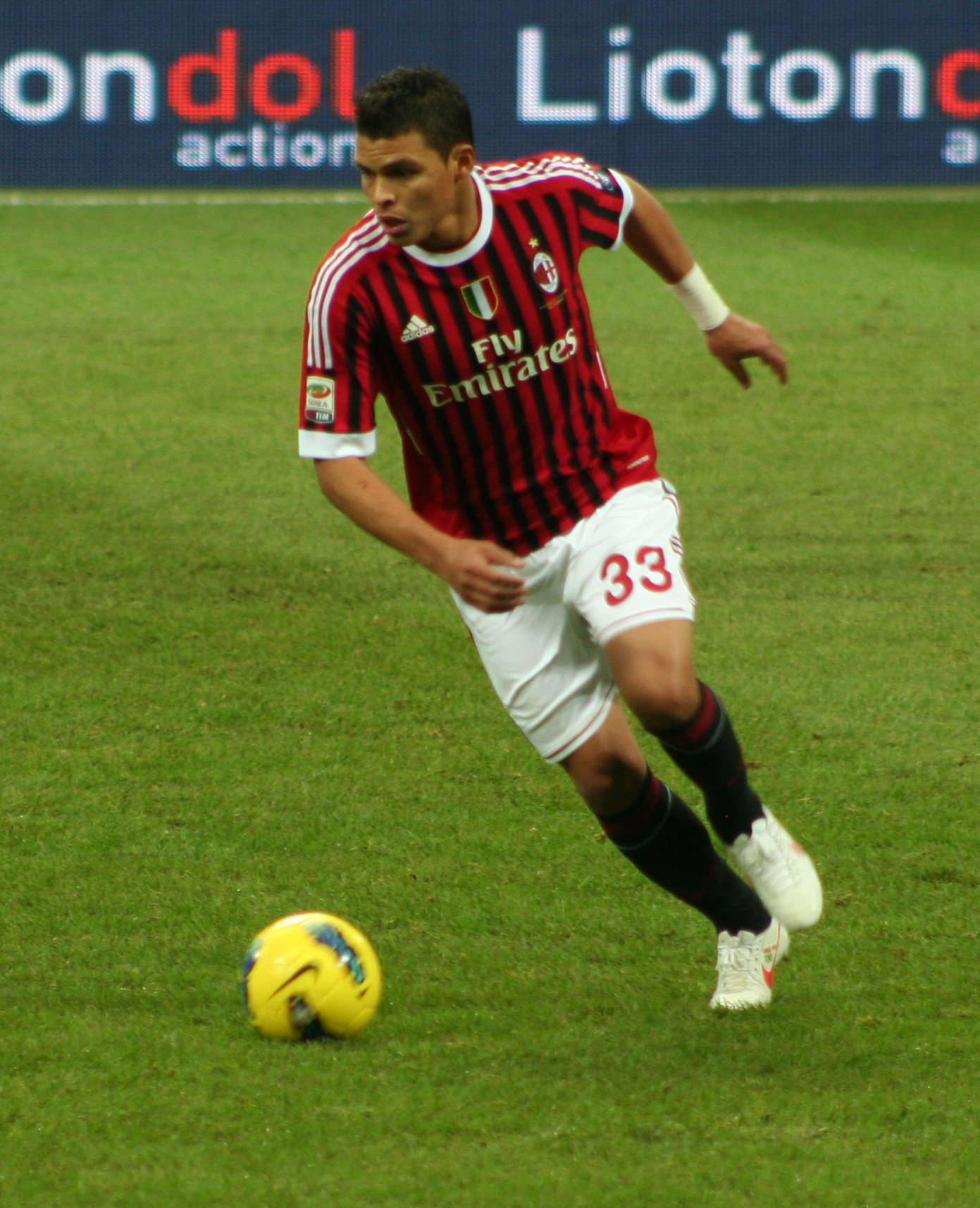
Thiago Silva

- Duilio Salatin – Lazio – 1933–34
- Samir – Verona, Udinese – 2015–22
- Samuel – Perugia – 2001–02
- Sandro – Benevento, Genoa, Udinese – 2017–19
- Dino Sani – Milan – 1961–64
- Juvenal Santillo – Napoli – 1933–34
- **Alisson Santos** – **Napoli** – 2025–
- Márcio Santos – Fiorentina – 1994–95
- Rafael Santos – Bologna – 2009–10
- Schumacher – Udinese – 2006–07
- Léo Sena – Spezia – 2020–21
- Henrique Serafini – Lazio – 1931–35
- Serginho – Milan – 1999–2008
- Bruno Siciliano – Vicenza, Venezia, Juventus, Bari – 1960–64
- Sidny – Livorno – 2007–08
- Silas – Cesena, Sampdoria – 1990–92
- Thiago Silva – Milan – 2009–12
- Fábio Simplício – Parma, Palermo, Roma – 2004–12
- Guilherme Siqueira – Udinese – 2006–08, 2009–10
- Sócrates – Fiorentina – 1984–85
- Wilson Sorio – Spal – 1957–59
- Gabriel Strefezza – SPAL, Lecce, Como, Parma – 2019–20, 2022–26

== T ==
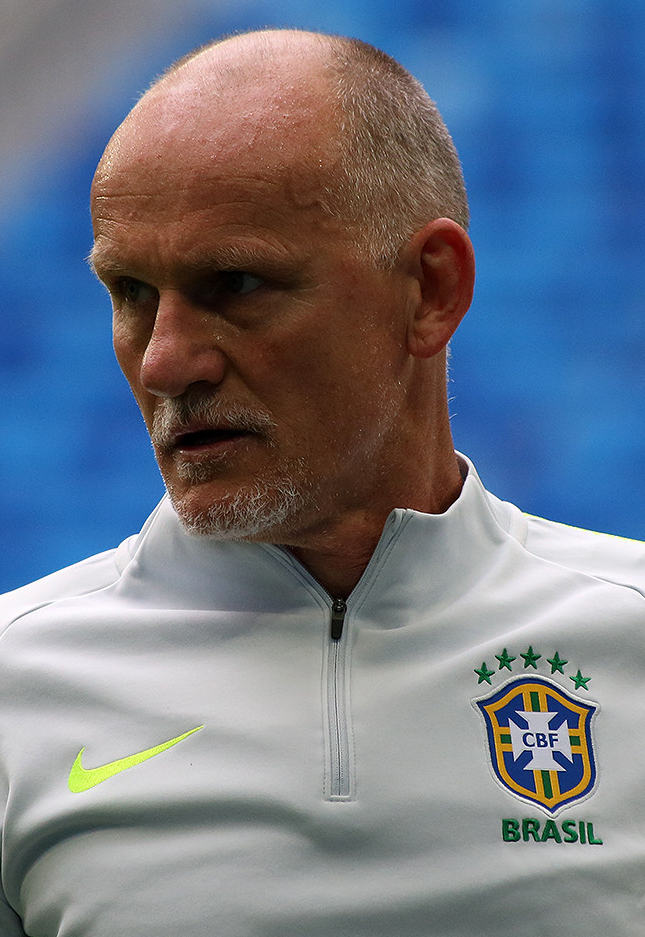
Cláudio Taffarel

- Rodrigo Taddei – Siena, Roma – 2003–14
- Cláudio Taffarel – Parma, Reggiana – 1990–94, 2001–02
- Júnior Tavares – Sampdoria – 2018–19
- André Tedesco – Lazio – 1931–32
- Alex Telles – Inter – 2015–16
- Tita – Pescara – 1988–89
- Eugênio Rômulo Togni – Pescara – 2012–13
- Humberto Tozzi – Lazio – 1956–60
- Ruan Tressoldi – Sassuolo – 2021–24
- Tuta – Venezia – 1998–99

== U ==
- Bruno Uvini – Napoli – 2013–14

== V ==
- Vágner – Roma – 1997–98
- Vampeta – Inter – 2000–01
- Ronaldo Vanin – Torino – 2002–03
- **Viery** – **Fiorentina** – 2026–
- Vinício – Napoli, Bologna, Vicenza, Inter – 1955–68
- Vitor Hugo – Fiorentina – 2017–19
- Felipe Vizeu – Udinese – 2018–19

== W ==
- Walace – Udinese – 2019–24
- Wallace (Wallace Fortuna dos Santos) – Lazio – 2016–19
- Wallace (Wallace Oliveira dos Santos) – Inter, Carpi – 2013–14, 2015–16
- Warley – Udinese – 1999–2000, 2001–03
- Wellington – Catania – 2011–12
- **Wesley** – **Roma** – 2025–
- Wilker – Treviso – 2005–06
- Willians – Udinese – 2012–13
- Wilson – Genoa – 2007–08

== Z ==
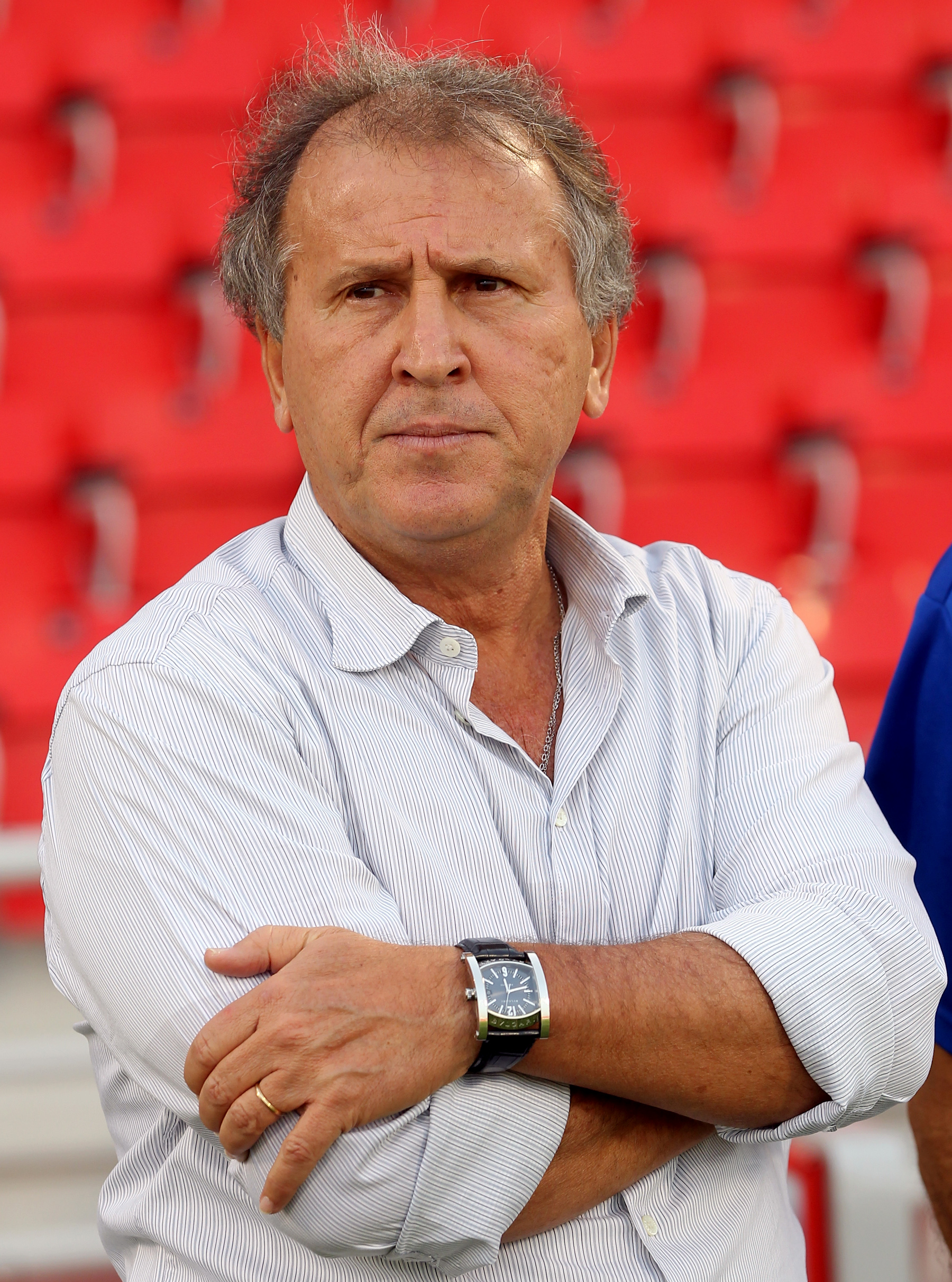
Zico

- Antônio Carlos Zago – Roma – 1997–2002
- Zé Eduardo (Bischofe de Almeida ) – Genoa, Siena – 2011–13
- Zé Eduardo (de Araújo) – Parma, Cesena – 2010–12, 2014–15
- Zé Elias – Inter, Bologna – 1997–2000
- Zé Maria – Parma, Perugia, Inter – 1996–99, 2000–06
- Agostinho Zeola – Napoli – 1957–58
- Zico – Udinese – 1983–85

== See also ==
- List of foreign Serie A players
- Foreign Serie A Footballer of the Year
- List of Brazilian footballers in Serie B
- Oriundo

== Notes ==
1. Born in Belgium
2. Capped for the Belgium national under-17 football team
3. Capped for the Belgium national under-16 football team
4. Capped for the Belgium national under-15 football team
5. Capped for the Italy national under-20 football team
6. Capped for the Italy national under-19 football team
7. Capped for the Sardinia national football team
8. Capped for the Serbia national under-19 football team
9. Capped for the Spain national under-19 football team
10. Capped for the Spain national under-17 football team
11. Capped for the Spain national under-16 football team
