= Binho =

Binho is a nickname. It may refer to:

== Football ==
- Binho (footballer, born 1975), born Fábio Eduardo Cribari, Brazilian defender
- Binho (footballer, born 1977), born George Miranda dos Santos, Brazilian midfielder

== Politics ==
- Binho Marques (born 1962), Brazilian politician
