= 2000–01 Ekstraklasa =

74th season of top-tier football league in Poland

Liga
- Season: 2000–01
- Champions: Wisła Kraków; 8th Ekstraklasa title 7th Polish title
- Relegated: Orlen Płock; Ruch Radzionków
- Top goalscorer: Tomasz Frankowski (18 goals)
- Average attendance: 4,465 ▼3.4%

Statistics of Ekstraklasa for the 2000–01 season.

== Overview ==
16 teams competed in the 2000–01 season. Wisła Kraków won the championship.

== League table ==
Pos	Team	Pld	W	D	L	GF	GA	GD	Pts	Qualification or relegation
1	Wisła Kraków (C)	30	19	5	6	66	27	+39	62	Qualification to Champions League second qualifying round
2	Pogoń Szczecin	30	16	5	9	43	33	+10	53	Qualification to UEFA Cup qualifying round
3	Legia Warsaw	30	14	8	8	45	29	+16	50	Qualification to UEFA Cup qualifying round
4	Polonia Warsaw	30	13	7	10	38	30	+8	46	Qualification to UEFA Cup qualifying round
5	Zagłębie Lubin	30	14	4	12	43	40	+3	46	Qualification to Intertoto Cup first round
6	Ruch Chorzów	30	13	5	12	50	48	+2	44	
7	Amica Wronki	30	13	5	12	48	44	+4	44	
8	GKS Katowice	30	9	15	6	28	22	+6	42	
9	Odra Wodzisław	30	10	9	11	39	46	−7	39	
10	Groclin Grodzisk	30	9	10	11	35	38	−3	37	Qualification to Intertoto Cup first round
11	Śląsk Wrocław	30	9	9	12	32	38	−6	36	
12	Widzew Łódź	30	9	9	12	33	40	−7	36	
13	Górnik Zabrze	30	9	7	14	29	35	−6	34	
14	Stomil Olsztyn (O)	30	10	4	16	22	41	−19	34	Qualification to relegation playoffs
15	Orlen Płock (R)	30	9	4	17	37	55	−18	31	Relegated to II liga
16	Ruch Radzionków (R)	30	9	4	17	29	51	−22	31	Relegated to II liga

Source: 90minut.pl (in Polish)
(C) Champions; (O) Play-off winners; (R) Relegated

== Results ==
Home \ Away	AMC	KAT	GÓR	DSK	LEG	ODR	OPŁ	POG	PWA	RUC	RAD	STO	ŚLĄ	WID	WIS	ZLU
Amica Wronki		1–1	3–0	2–2	3–2	4–0	2–0	1–2	1–0	2–1	3–0	2–0	0–1	3–1	2–1	1–1
GKS Katowice	4–1		1–1	1–1	1–0	2–2	0–0	0–0	0–0	1–1	3–0	2–0	1–1	3–1	0–3	0–2
Górnik Zabrze	1–0	0–0		1–2	1–0	1–1	1–0	1–0	2–1	4–1	0–1	2–0	2–0	0–2	1–2	1–1
Dyskobolia	1–1	1–0	2–1		0–1	1–1	1–2	2–1	0–0	0–2	3–0	1–0	1–2	1–1	0–3	2–0
Legia Warsaw	3–0	0–2	1–1	3–1		2–0	1–1	3–2	1–0	1–0	3–0	2–1	3–1	0–0	1–2	1–0
Odra Wodzisław	2–1	0–0	0–0	2–1	1–5		4–0	4–0	2–0	2–1	2–2	2–1	1–1	2–2	0–2	0–1
Orlen Płock	2–6	0–0	1–0	1–0	1–0	1–2		1–4	0–1	3–4	6–3	1–2	2–1	4–1	0–5	1–3
Pogoń Szczecin	2–1	1–2	2–1	2–0	1–1	2–1	3–2		3–4	3–3	1–0	1–0	2–0	3–0	0–0	1–1
Polonia Warsaw	3–0	1–1	0–2	1–1	0–0	1–2	1–0	1–2		1–2	2–1	4–1	3–1	3–1	0–2	2–0
Ruch Chorzów	3–1	0–0	3–2	4–3	1–4	3–0	1–1	0–1	0–3		1–2	4–1	3–1	2–1	2–1	1–2
Ruch Radzionków	1–2	0–1	3–1	2–1	0–1	0–1	2–1	1–0	1–1	0–3 (Note: The match between Ruch Radzionków and Ruch Chorzów (originally finished 2–3) verified to wo. An ineligible player fielded by Ruch R. (Marcin Klaczka).)		0–0	2–0	1–0	0–2	2–1
Stomil Olsztyn	2–1	1–0	1–0	0–0	2–1	3–1	1–0	0–1	0–3	0–0	1–0		1–2	1–0	0–3	1–3
Śląsk Wrocław	1–1	0–1	1–0	1–1	1–1	2–2	0–1	1–0	0–1	3–2	1–1	0–1		0–0	0–1	2–1
Widzew Łódź	0–1	0–0	1–0	1–2	0–0	4–1	3–2	1–0	0–0	1–0	3–1	1–1	0–3		3–0	1–0
Wisła Kraków	4–0	3–1	3–0	1–1	3–3	2–1	1–2	1–2	4–0	2–0	4–0	2–0	2–2	2–2		3–0
Zagłębie Lubin	3–2	1–0	2–2	1–3	3–1	1–0	2–1	0–1	0–1	0–2	3–1	2–0	1–3	4–2	4–2	

Source: 90minut.pl (in Polish)
Legend: Blue = home team win; Yellow = draw; Red = away team win.

== Relegation playoffs ==
The matches were played on 20 and 24 June 2001.

Team 1	Agg.	Team 2	1st leg	2nd leg
Górnik Polkowice	0–0 (a.e.t.) (4–5 p)	Stomil Olsztyn	0–0	0–0

== Top goalscorers ==
Rank	Player	Club	Goals
1	(Poland) Tomasz Frankowski	Wisła Kraków	19
2	(Poland) Zbigniew Grzybowski	Zagłębie Lubin	14
3	(Poland) Marcin Mięciel	Legia Warsaw	13
4	(Poland) Mariusz Śrutwa	Ruch Chorzów	11
5	(Poland) Arkadiusz Klimek	Zagłębie Lubin	10
5	(Poland) Olgierd Moskalewicz	Wisła Kraków	10
7	(Brazil) Giuliano	Legia Warsaw	9
7	(Poland) Grzegorz Mielcarski	Pogoń Szczecin	9
7	(Poland) Grzegorz Rasiak	Odra Wodzisław	9
7	(Poland) Paweł Sibik	Odra Wodzisław	9

== Attendances ==
Club	Average
Pogoń Szczecin	9,967
Legia Warszawa	8,353
Wisła Kraków	8,267
Śląsk Wrocław	5,000
Stomil Olsztyn	4,500
Wisła Płock	4,000
GKS Katowice	3,800
Górnik Zabrze	3,602
Widzew Łódź	3,462
Zagłębie Lubin	3,433
Ruch Chorzów	3,411
Ruch Radzionków	3,367
Polonia Warszawa	2,960
Dyskobolia	2,767
Odra Wodzisław Śląski	2,627
Amica Wronki	1,920
