= Tessem =

Tessem is a Norwegian surname. Notable people with the surname include:

- Jo Tessem (born 1972), Norwegian footballer
- Peter Tessem, Norwegian carpenter and member of Roald Amundsen's 1918 Arctic expedition

== See also ==
- Tesser
- Tjessem
