= Cruzeiro do Sul =

Cruzeiro do Sul is the name of the Southern Cross (Crux) constellation in Portuguese.

It may refer to any of the following:

- Cruzeiro do Sul, Acre, a town in the state of Acre, Brazil
- Cruzeiro do Sul, Paraná, a town in the state of Paraná, Brazil
- Cruzeiro do Sul, Rio Grande do Sul, a town in the state of Rio Grande do Sul, Brazil
- Serviços Aéreos Cruzeiro do Sul, a defunct Brazilian airline, founded in 1927
- Order of the Southern Cross (Ordem Nacional do Cruzeiro do Sul), Brazil's highest order of merit
- Cruzeiro do Sul is an old Samba school in Novo Hamburgo, Rio Grande do Sul
- Cruzeiro do Sul (film), a 1966 film by Fernando Lopes
- Cruzeiro do Sul, a 1922 picture by Jorge Colaço, representing a Portuguese ship navigating by the stars in the Southern Cross, exhibited in Pavilhão Carlos Lopes in Lisbon (Lisboa, Portugal.)
