= Bruno Leonardo Vicente =

Brazilian footballer (born 1989)

Personal information
- Date of birth: 18 February 1989 (age 37)
- Place of birth: Cruzeiro do Sul, Paraná, Brazil
- Height: 1.76 m (5 ft 9 1/2 in)
- Position: Midfielder

Team information
- Current team: Matera
- Number: 8

Youth career
- 2006–2008: Figueirense
- 2008–2009: Campo Grande
- 2008–2009: → Treviso (loan)

Senior career*
Years	Team	Apps	(Gls)
2008–2009	Campo Grande	0	(0)
2008–2009	→ Treviso (loan)	1	(0)
2009–2010	Portogruaro	25	(0)
2010–2013	Padova	16	(1)
2011–2012	→ Como (loan)	16	(0)
2012–2013	→ Botev Vratsa (loan)	22	(0)
2013–2014	Parma	0	(0)
2013–2014	→ Gorica (loan)	21	(0)
2015–2016	Akragas	26	(1)
2016–2017	Melfi	30	(2)
2017–2018	Akragas	17	(0)
2018–2020	Juve Stabia	44	(0)
2020–2021	Catania	12	(0)
2021	Renate	6	(0)
2021–2022	Casertana	29	(3)
2022–	Matera	30	(0)
- * Club domestic league appearances and goals as of 6 May 2023

Bruno Leonardo Vicente (born 18 February 1989) is a Brazilian footballer who plays as a midfielder for Italian club Matera. He also holds Italian citizenship.

== Club career ==
Born in Cruzeiro do Sul, Paraná, Vicente started his career at Santa Catarina side Figueirense. He signed a 3-year contract in 2006. In June 2008, he was signed by Campo Grande until December 2009 (de facto associated with agent company Pedrinho VRP), but in August 2008, he was loaned to Serie B strugglers Treviso, along with Vanderson and Ricardo. Primary a Primavera team player, Vicente made his Serie B debut on 25 April 2009, replacing Federico Piovaccari in the 68th minute. Treviso relegated after the season and he was signed by Lega Pro Prima Divisione side Portogruaro. He became one of the regular starter of the team, started 20 league matches and won the Group B champion. On 13 July 2010, he signed a 1+3-year contract with Serie B side Padova.

In July 2013, Vicente was signed by Parma for an undisclosed fee, with Francesco Modesto moving in the opposite direction for a fee of €250,000. Vicente was immediately left for Slovenian club ND Gorica, along with other Parma-contracted players Abel Gigli and Ronaldo Vanin.

After the bankruptcy of Parma in the summer of 2015, Vicente was signed by Akragas.

On 26 September 2016 Vicente was signed by Melfi on another free transfer.

On 7 January 2020, he signed a 1.5-year contract with Catania.

On 18 January 2021, he moved to Renate.

He finished his contract with Renate at the end of the season. On 16 September 2021 he joined Serie D club Casertana.

== Honours ==
Portogruaro

- Lega Pro Prima Divisione (Group B): 2009–10
