= Diego Simões =

Brazilian footballer (born 1991)

Personal information
- Full name: Diego de Souza Simões
- Date of birth: 18 January 1991 (age 35)
- Place of birth: São Lourenço, Brazil
- Height: 1.75 m (5 ft 9 in)
- Position: Attacking midfielder

Team information
- Current team: Cheraschese

Youth career
- 2004: Campo Grande
- 2005–2010: Padova
- 2009: → Palmeiras (loan)
- 2009–2010: → Grêmio (loan)

Senior career*
Years	Team	Apps	(Gls)
2010–2011	Padova	1	(0)
2010–2011	→ Carpi (loan)	2	(0)
2011–2012	Lugano II	15	(2)
2012–2013	Giorgione	21	(1)
2013	Ragusa	15	(3)
2014	Noto	10	(1)
2014	Orizzonti		
2014–2015	Pinerolo		
2015–2016	San Domenico Savio		
2016	Gozzano	10	(1)
2016–2017	Argentina	5	(0)
2017–2018	Alpignano		
2018	Bra	11	(1)
2018–2019	Alba		
2019	Bagnolese		
2019–2021	Benarzole		
2021	Fossano	9	(3)
2021–2022	Benarzole		
2022	Fossano		
2022–2023	Benarzole		
2023–	Fossano	21	(2)
- * Club domestic league appearances and goals as of 10 November 2024

Diego de Souza Simões (born 18 January 1991) is a Brazilian footballer who plays for Italian Serie D club Fossano. He also holds a Portuguese passport.

== Biography ==
Born in Brazil, Simões started his Italy career in Calcio Padova. He was the member of U17 team in 2006–07 season. and 2007–08 season. In October 2008, he was absent from training without leave and FIGC imposed a minor sentence, as he had an excuse of visiting injured relatives in London. He then returned to Brazil for Palmeiras and Grêmio on loan while his registration rights were held by his agent Pedrinho VRP via Campo Grande.

In 2010, he returned to Padova On 9 April, he replaced Claudio Matias Cuffa in the last minutes and made his Serie B debut. That match was a 0–0 draw with Salernitana. He wore shirt number 69 that season.

In August 2010, he was loaned to Carpi.
