= Tjessem =

Tjessem is a Norwegian surname. Notable people with the surname include:

- Charles Tjessem (born 1971), Norwegian chef
- Mette-Marit Tjessem Høiby (born 1973), Crown Princess of Norway

== See also ==
- Tessem
