= Giuliano (footballer, born 1977) =

Brazilian footballer

Personal information
- Full name: Giuliano Marinho dos Santos
- Date of birth: 13 August 1977 (age 49)
- Place of birth: Cruzeiro do Sul, Paraná, Brazil
- Height: 1.76 m (5 ft 9 1/2 in)
- Position: Right midfielder

Senior career*
| Years | Team | Apps | (Gls) |
| 1994–1996 | José Bonifácio EC | | |
| 1996–2000 | Ituano | | |
| 1997 | → Sãocarlense (loan) | | |
| 1998 | → Comercial (RP) (loan) | | |
| 1999 | → Ferroviária (loan) | | |
| 1999 | → XV de Piracicaba (loan) | | |
| 2000–2001 | Legia Warsaw | 27 | (9) |
| 2001 | Vasco da Gama | 2 | (0) |
| 2002 | Ituano | | |
| 2002–2003 | Widzew Łódź | 25 | (2) |
| 2003–2004 | Panionios | 20 | (0) |
| 2004–2005 | Pogoń Szczecin | 7 | (0) |
| 2005 | Paraná | | |
| 2005–2008 | Panachaiki | 29 | (0) |
| 2006–2007 | → Niki Volos (loan) | | |
| 2008 | → Comercial (RP) (loan) | | |
| 2008–2009 | Budućnost Podgorica | 16 | (1) |
- * Club domestic league appearances and goals

Giuliano Marinho dos Santos, better known simply as Giuliano (born 13 August 1977) is a Brazilian former professional footballer who played as a right midfielder.

== Honours ==
Ituano

- Campeonato Paulista: 2002
