= Tesser =

Tesser is a surname. Notable people with the surname include:

- Abraham Tesser (born 1941), American psychologist
- Attilio Tesser (born 1958), Italian footballer and manager
- Gregory Tesser (born 1946), English journalist
- Kristina Tesser Derksen, Canadian politician
- Rafael Tesser (born 1981), Brazilian footballer
- Ray Tesser (1912–1982), American football player
