= Leandro Gobatto =

Brazilian footballer (born 1982)

Personal information
- Date of birth: 4 April 1982 (age 44)
- Place of birth: São Paulo, Brazil
- Height: 1.65 m (5 ft 5 in)
- Position: Midfielder

Senior career*
Years	Team	Apps	(Gls)
2000–2004	Juventus-SP		
2004–2008	Brujas		
2006–2007	→ Piacenza (loan)	9	(0)
2009	Santa Cruz		
2010–2012	São Bernardo FC	23	(3)
2013	Grêmio Osasco	1	(0)
2015	Flamengo-SP	14	(0)
- * Club domestic league appearances and goals

Leandro Gobatto (born 4 April 1982) is a Brazilian former footballer who played as a midfielder.

== Career ==
Having started his career at Juventus-SP, Gobatto also played in Costa Rica for Brujas F.C. and in Italy for Piacenza. He also had spells at Santa Cruz, São Bernardo, and Grêmio Osasco. He ended his career at Flamengo de Guarulhos in 2015.
