= César (footballer, born May 1979) =

Brazilian footballer

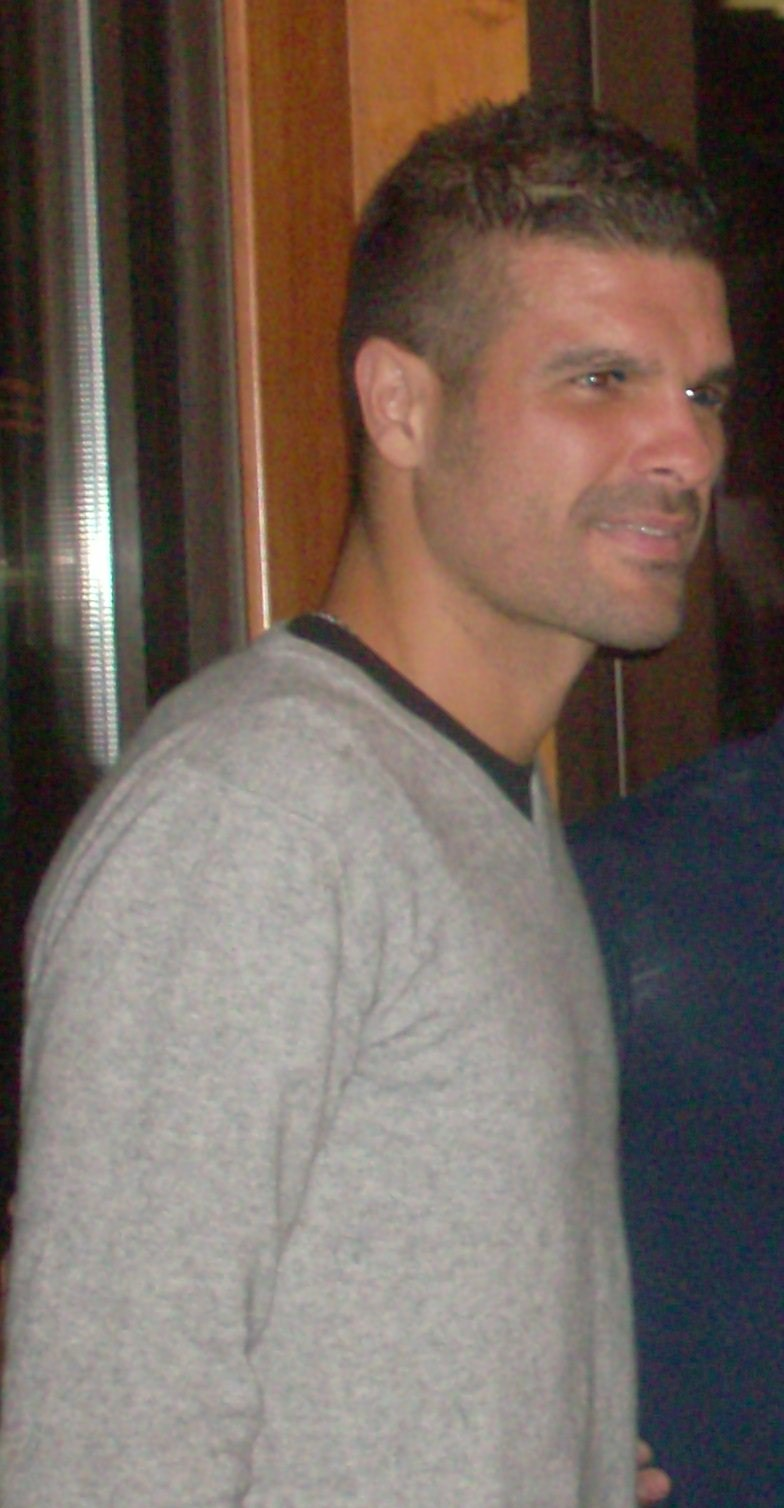

Personal information
- Full name: César Vinicio Cervo de Luca
- Date of birth: 19 May 1979 (age 47)
- Place of birth: Rio de Janeiro, Brazil
- Height: 1.83 m (6 ft 0 in)
- Position: Centre back

Senior career*
Years	Team	Apps	(Gls)
2000–2003	Fluminense	97	(8)
2004–2005	Chievo	7	(1)
2005	→ Catania (loan)	19	(0)
2005–2007	Catania	37	(1)
2007–2009	Chievo	39	(4)
2009	→ Padova (loan)	37	(0)
2009–2011	Padova	36	(0)
2011	Juve Stabia	1	(0)
2012	Cremonese	14	(0)
2012–2015	Virtus Entella	94	(5)
- * Club domestic league appearances and goals

César Vinicio Cervo de Luca (born 19 May 1979), known as just César, is a Brazilian football coach and former defender. César also holds Italian nationality through descent.

== Playing career ==
Born in Rio de Janeiro, Brazil, César started his career with hometown club Fluminense.

=== Chievo and Catania ===
In January 2004, he was signed by Italian Serie A club Chievo on a free transfer. He signed a 6-month contract with an option to extend to 30 June 2007. In January 2005 he was loaned to Serie B club Catania along with Higo. Catania later bought him in co-ownership deal for €150,000. He followed the team promoted to Serie A and played his first Serie A match on 18 February 2007 against Fiorentina since he left Chievo 3 years before. That season, he only played 8 Serie A matches. In June 2007, Chievo was announced to buy back the player from Catania through a closed tender bid mediated by Lega Calcio for €440,000. He was a regular starter for Chievo in 2007–08 Serie B, partnered with Davide Mandelli, winning the cadetto that season and promoted back to Serie A in 2008. With arrival of Santiago Morero and Mario Yepes, César became a backup again in 2008–09 Serie A.

=== Padova ===
In January 2009, he was loaned to Padova. He won Lega Pro Prima Divisione runner-up with team and promoted to Serie B. But Padova did not exercise the right to buy him in co-ownership deal. However, in July 2009 he was signed outright for free, agreed a 2-year contract.

== Post-playing and coaching career ==
After retirement as a professional footballer, César became a "team manager" of Virtus Entella.

In May 2019, he joined Alfredo Aglietti's coaching staff at Verona. He subsequently followed Aglietti at Chievo and Reggina. On 21 December 2022, César was hired by Brescia as an assistant following Aglietti's appointment as head coach. He left Brescia together with Aglietti a few months later, then re-joining him at fellow Serie B club Lecco between February and April 2024.

== Honours ==
- Serie B: 2008
