= Eloi (footballer) =

Brazilian footballer (born 1955)

Personal information
- Full name: Francisco Chagas Eloia
- Date of birth: 17 February 1955 (age 71)
- Place of birth: Brazil
- Position: Midfielder

Senior career*
Years	Team	Apps	(Gls)
-1977	Juventus (SP)		
1978-1979	Portuguesa	37	(8)
1980	Inter de Limeira	22	(10)
1981	Santos		
1982	Cruzeiro		
1982	America (RJ)	6	(3)
1983	Vasco da Gama	22	(9)
1983-1985	Genoa	34	(0)
1985	Botafogo	17	(9)
1985-1987	FC Porto	20	(7)
1988-1989	Boavista	21	(4)
1989-1990	Louletano	21	(7)
1992	Fluminense	11	(2)
1993	Fortaleza	3	(1)
1994	Ceará	10	(0)
1996	Nacional (AM)	1	(0)
- * Club domestic league appearances and goals

Francisco Chagas Eloia (born 17 February 1955 in Brazil), known as just Eloi, is a Brazilian retired footballer.

== Honours ==
Porto

- Primeira Divisão: 1985–86
