= Rafael Bondi =

Brazilian footballer

Personal information
- Full name: Renato Rafael Bondi
- Date of birth: March 20, 1981 (age 45)
- Place of birth: São João de Meriti, RJ, Brazil
- Height: 1.80 m (5 ft 11 in)
- Position: Midfielder

Team information
- Current team: Alessandria

Senior career*
Years	Team	Apps	(Gls)
1997–1998	Londrina	33	(15)
1999–2000	Atlético Paranaense	35	(16)
2001	Juan Aurich	12	(6)
2002	Dom Pedro Bandeirante		
2002–2003	Salernitana	7	(0)
2003–2004	Cavese	31	(7)
2004–2006	Teramo	49	(6)
2006	→ Messina (loan)	11	(0)
2006–2009	Arezzo	98	(9)
2009–2010	Perugia	33	(10)
2010–2011	Grosseto	8	(0)
2011	Alessandria	16	(1)
- * Club domestic league appearances and goals as of May 2011

Renato Rafael Bondi (born 20 March 1981 in São João de Meriti, Rio de Janeiro) is a Brazilian former footballer. He played as a midfielder.

He arrived in Italy from Dom Pedro Bandeirante on 28 August 2002.

In June 2010 he completed his transfer from Perugia Calcio to US. Grosseto. In January 2011 he moved to the Italian 3rd tier club Alessandria.
