= Bruno Siciliano (footballer) =

Brazilian footballer (born 1938)

Personal information
- Date of birth: 19 January 1938 (age 88)
- Place of birth: Rio de Janeiro, Brazil
- Position: Striker

Senior career*
Years	Team	Apps	(Gls)
1958–1960	Botafogo		
1960	Juventus	0	(0)
1960–1961	L.R. Vicenza	21	(0)
1961–1962	Venezia	23	(8)
1962–1963	Juventus	12	(4)
1963–1966	Bari	75	(10)
1967	New York Generals	8	(0)
- * Club domestic league appearances and goals

Bruno Siciliano (born 19 January 1938) is a retired Brazilian professional footballer who played as a forward. He spent most of his career in Italy with L.R. Vicenza, Venezia, Juventus, and Bari before finishing his career playing for the New York Generals of the National Professional Soccer League.
