= Lucas Felippe =

Brazilian footballer (born 2000)

Personal information
- Full name: Lucas Martello Felippe Nascimento
- Date of birth: 3 May 2000 (age 26)
- Place of birth: São Paulo, Brazil
- Height: 1.78 m (5 ft 10 in)
- Position: Midfielder

Team information
- Current team: Virtus Entella (on loan from Potenza)
- Number: 55

Youth career
- 2017–2020: Hellas Verona

Senior career*
Years	Team	Apps	(Gls)
2020–2021	Hellas Verona	2	(0)
2020–2021	→ Mantova (loan)	29	(0)
2021–2022	Farense	0	(0)
2022–2023	Giugliano	31	(3)
2023–2025	Crotone	32	(2)
2024–2025	→ Potenza (loan)	24	(2)
2025–	Potenza	38	(8)
2026–	→ Virtus Entella (loan)	1	(0)
- * Club domestic league appearances and goals as of 22 August 2026

Lucas Martello Felippe Nascimento (born 3 May 2000) is a Brazilian professional footballer who plays as a midfielder for Serie B club Virtus Entella, on loan from Potenza.

== Career ==
On 1 February 2019, Felippe signed a professional contract with Hellas Verona until 2022. He made his professional debut with Hellas Verona in a 2–0 Serie A loss to Brescia on 5 July 2020.

On 5 October 2020, he joined Serie C club Mantova on loan.

On 2 August 2021, he joined Portuguese side Farense on a permanent basis.

On 21 July 2023, Felippe signed a three-year contract with Crotone.

== Personal life ==
Felippe was born in Brazil, and is of Italian and Spanish descent. He holds Spanish nationality.
