= Rafael Tesser =

Brazilian footballer (born 1981)

Personal information
- Full name: Rafael Luiz Baüml Tesser
- Date of birth: 16 May 1981 (age 45)
- Place of birth: Curitiba, Brazil
- Height: 1.81 m (5 ft 11 in)
- Position: Full back

Team information
- Current team: América-SP

Senior career*
Years	Team	Apps	(Gls)
2001–2004	Coritiba	9	(0)
2003	→ Dinamo Tbilisi (loan)		
2005	Atlético Mineiro	1	(0)
2006	Joinville	0	(0)
2006	Ituano	12	(1)
2007	Lecce	13	(0)
2007–2008	Taranto	15	(2)
2008	Benevento	12	(1)
2009	Marcílio Dias	6	(0)
2009–2010	Joinville	10	(0)
2011	Red Bull Brasil	0	(0)
2011	Grêmio Prudente	4	(0)
2012–	América-SP		
- * Club domestic league appearances and goals

Rafael Luiz Baüml Tesser (born 16 May 1981), better known as Tesser, is a Brazilian footballer who plays as defender.

== Career ==
He began his professional career playing for Tarmandaré in 2000. From 2001 to 2004, he was at Coritiba at Série A. In January 2005, he signed a one-year contract with Atlético Mineiro at Série A. He then played for Joinville and Ituano at Série B.

In January 2007, transfer window he joined Italian Serie B team U.S. Lecce . He then joined Taranto Sport. Tesser was on a tryout at Serbian Red Star Belgrade which was managed by his former coach at US Lecce, Zdenek Zeman, but he did not pass tryout at Serbian Red Star Belgrade. Then he was signed by Italian Lega Pro side Benevento.

In March 2009, he signed a contract until the end of season with Marcílio Dias at Série C.

In August 2009, he rejoined Joinville.
