= Anderson (footballer, born April 1983) =

Brazilian footballer

Personal information
- Full name: Robert Anderson Cavalheiro
- Date of birth: 1 April 1983 (age 43)
- Place of birth: Guimarães, Brazil
- Height: 1.86 m (6 ft 1 in)
- Position: Left back

Senior career*
| Years | Team | Apps | (Gls) |
| 2000–2003 | Padova | 13 | (1) |
| 2002 | → Pordenone (loan) | 8 | (1) |
| 2003 | → Como (loan) | 1 | (0) |
| 2004–2006 | Genoa | 2 | (0) |
| 2004–2005 | → Pro Vercelli (loan) | 31 | (1) |
| 2005–2006 | → Treviso (loan) | 2 | (0) |
| 2006–2007 | Treviso | 2 | (0) |
| 2007–2008 | Reggiana | 33 | (1) |
| 2008–2009 | Venezia | 27 | (1) |
| 2009–2010 | Reggiana | 28 | (3) |
| 2009–2011 | Hellas Verona | 12 | (0) |
| 2012 | Vila Nova | 2 | (0) |
- * Club domestic league appearances and goals

Robert Anderson Cavalheiro (born 1 April 1983) is a former Brazilian footballer who played as a left back.
