= Higo (footballer) =

Brazilian footballer (born 1986)

Personal information
- Full name: Higo Seara Santos de Oliveira
- Date of birth: May 1, 1986 (age 40)
- Place of birth: Santa Luzia, Brazil
- Height: 1.75 m (5 ft 9 in)
- Position: Midfielder

Senior career*
| Years | Team | Apps | (Gls) |
| 2003–2007 | Chievo | 1 | (0) |
| 2005 | → Catania (loan) | 0 | (0) |
| 2005–2006 | → Bellaria Igea (loan) | 10 | (0) |
| 2006 | → Nocerina (loan) | 12 | (1) |
| 2007 | → Koper (loan) | 5 | (0) |
- * Club domestic league appearances and goals

Higo Seara Santos de Oliveira, commonly known simply as Higo (born 1 May 1986) is a Brazilian former football midfielder.

He usually played as a left winger.

In 2003, he signed with A.C. ChievoVerona and he debuted in the Serie A being only 17. In the following seasons he was member of Calcio Catania in the Serie B and A.C. Bellaria Igea Marina and A.S.G. Nocerina in the Serie C2. In the winter break of the 2006-07 season he moved to the neighbouring Slovenia playing half season with FC Koper playing in the First League.

== External sources ==
- Higo at TuttoCalciatori.net (in Italian)
- Stats from Slovenia at PrvaLiga (in Slovene)
- Higo at WorldFootball.net
