= Wilker (footballer, born 1987) =

Brazilian footballer (born 1987)

Personal information
- Full name: Wilker Pereira dos Santos
- Date of birth: 16 June 1987 (age 39)
- Place of birth: Bahia, Brazil
- Height: 1.75 m (5 ft 9 in)
- Position: Forward

Team information
- Current team: Tërbuni Pukë
- Number: 7

Senior career*
Years	Team	Apps	(Gls)
2005–2009	Treviso	5	(0)
2007–2008	→ Lanciano (loan)	23	(1)
2009–2010	Genoa	0	(0)
2009–2010	→ Saint-Gilloise (loan)	25	(7)
2010–2011	Prato	0	(0)
2013	Lokomotiv Sofia	3	(0)
2014	Serrano	4	(0)
2016–	Tërbuni Pukë	1	(0)
- * Club domestic league appearances and goals

Wilker Pereira dos Santos, known simply as Wilker, (born 16 June 1987) is a Brazilian former footballer who played as a forward for Tërbuni Pukë in the Albanian Superliga.

== Career ==
Wilker began his career with Treviso. During the 2005–06 season, at the age of 18, he made his Serie A debut, coming on as a substitute in a 2–1 home win over Udinese on 14 May 2006.
