= Binho (footballer, born 1975) =

Brazilian footballer

Personal information
- Full name: Fábio Eduardo Cribari
- Date of birth: February 13, 1975 (age 51)
- Place of birth: Cambará, Brazil
- Height: 1.80 m (5 ft 11 in)
- Position: Defender

Senior career*
Years	Team	Apps	(Gls)
1997	Londrina	30	(4)
1998–2000	Empoli	44	(0)
2000–2006	Lucchese	98	(10)
2003	→ Livorno (loan)	5	(0)
2006–2007	Castelnuovo	15	(0)
- * Club domestic league appearances and goals

Fábio Eduardo Cribari (born 13 February 1975 in Cambará, Paraná)), better known as Binho, is a Brazilian football defender. He last played for Castelnuovo in 2006-07 season.

== Football career ==
He started his professional career at his state, for Londrina. In January 1998, he left for Empoli with his brother Emílson. In summer 2000, he left for Lucchese, where he played for 6 seasons, excepted on 30 January 2003, left on loan for Livorno.
