= Cruzeiro do Sul, Paraná =

Cruzeiro do Sul
- Municipality
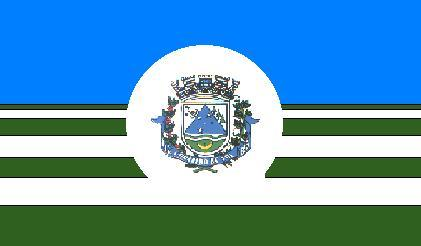
- Flag

- Municipal location within the State of Paraná

- Location in Brazil
- Coordinates: 22.961944°S 52.160833°W
- Country: Brazil
- State: Paraná
- Municipality: Cruzeiro do Sul

Government
  - Mayor: Ademir Mulon

Area
  - Total: 259.103 km^{2} (100.040 sq mi)
- Elevation: 465 m (1,526 ft)

Population (2020)
  - Total: 4,449
  - Density: 17.17/km^{2} (44.47/sq mi)
- Demonym: cruzeirense-do-sul
- Time zone: [[UTCBRT]]
  - Summer (DST): −3

Cruzeiro do Sul (Portuguese pronunciation: [kɾuˈzejɾu du ˈsuw], Southern Cross) is a municipality in the Brazilian state of Paraná. It has an area of 259.103 square kilometres (100.040 sq mi). It has a Humid subtropical climate. As of 2020 the estimated population was 4,449.

== Geography ==
Cruzeiro do Sul is in the state of Paraná, Brazil. It has an area of 259.103 square kilometres (100.040 sq mi) as of 2019. The elevation above sea level is about 465 metres (1,526 ft).

== Climate ==
The Köppen climate type is Cfa : Humid subtropical climate. The average annual temperature is 23 °C (73 °F). The average annual rainfall is 1,934 millimetres (76.1 in).

Cruzeiro do Sul, Paraná (state)|Paraná

Climate chart (precipitation, max. and min. temperature)
J	F	M	A	M	J	J	A	S	O	N	D
180 28 19	228 28 20	216 29 20	147 29 18	144 24 14	280 24 14	78 22 12	22 27 15	157 30 16	116 33 17	155 32 19	212 32 20
- █ Average max. and min. temperatures in °C
- █ Precipitation totals in mm
Imperial conversion
J	F	M	A	M	J	J	A	S	O	N	D
7.1 82 66	9 82 68	8.5 84 68	5.8 84 64	5.7 75 57	11 75 57	3.1 72 54	0.9 81 59	6.2 86 61	4.6 91 63	6.1 90 66	8.3 90 68
- █ Average max. and min. temperatures in °F
- █ Precipitation totals in inches

== Demographics ==
The population in the 2010 census was 4,563. The estimated population as of 2019 was 4,469. Population density as of 2010 was 17.61 inhabitants per square kilometre (45.6/sq mi). As of 2010, 98.5% of the population had attended school between the ages of 6 and 14. Also as of 2010, the municipal Human Development Index was 0.713. This compares to 0.437 in 1991 and 0.582 in 2000.

On the 2010 census religion was reported as Catholic by 3,409 people, Evangelical by 805 people and Animism by 59 people.

In 2017, the average monthly salary of formal workers was 2.2 minimum wages. Formally employed people were 12.1% of the total population. Households with monthly income of up to half a minimum wage per person represent 32.7% of the population. Estimates of GDP per capita:

== Health and sanitation ==
1.1% of households have adequate sanitation, 97.2% of urban households are on public roads with afforestation and 72.5% of urban households are on public roads with adequate urbanization (presence of manhole, sidewalk, pavement and curb). Annual hospitalizations due to diarrhea are 0 per 1,000 inhabitants. Deaths per 1,000 live births:

== Municipal finances ==
Committed municipal expenditure by year:

Realized municipal revenue by year:

== Sources ==
- Brasil / Paraná (state)|Paraná / Cruzeiro do Sul, IBGE
- "Cruzeiro do Sul", Geonames
- Cruzeiro do Sul, Brazilian Institute of Geography and Statistics
- "Cruzeiro do Sul, Brazil", Mindat
- NASA Earth Observations Data Set Index, NASA, archived from the original on 10 May 2020
- NASA Earth Observations: Rainfall (1 month - TRMM), NASA/Tropical Rainfall Monitoring Mission, archived from the original on 19 April 2019
