= Pedrinho (footballer, born 1957) =

Brazilian footballer

Personal information
- Full name: Pedro Luís Vicençote
- Date of birth: 22 October 1957 (age 69)
- Place of birth: Santo André, Brazil
- Height: 1.75 m (5 ft 9 in)
- Position: Defender

Senior career*
Years	Team	Apps	(Gls)
1977–1981	Palmeiras	47	(4)
1981–1983	Vasco da Gama	34	(3)
1983–1985	Catania	88	(10)
1986	Vasco da Gama	18	(0)
1987–1988	Bangu	21	(0)
Total		208	(17)

International career
1979–1983	Brazil	13	(1)
- * Club domestic league appearances and goals

Pedro Luís Vicençote (born 22 October 1957), best known as Pedrinho, is a Brazilian former footballer who played as a defender.

He played for Palmeiras (1977–1981), Vasco da Gama (1981–1983 and 1986), Bangu (1987–1988) and in Italian Serie A with Catania (1983–1985). He won two Rio de Janeiro State Championship in 1982 and 1987.

For the Brazil national football team he won 13 international caps (one goal scored), from July 1979 to June 1983, and was in the squad for the 1982 FIFA World Cup, although without playing a game during the tournament.

After retiring, he also worked as a football agent, and was known as Pedrinho VRP.

== Honours ==
Vasco da Gama

- Campeonato Carioca: 1982, 1987

Bangu

- Taça Rio: 1987
