= List of Italian football transfers summer 2016 =

This is a list of Italian football transfers featuring at least one Serie A or Serie B club which were completed from 1 July to 31 August 2016, the date which the summer transfer window closed. Free agents could join any club at any time.

== Transfers ==
Legend

- Those clubs in Italic indicate that the player already left the team on loan on this or the previous season or new signing that immediately left the club

=== February - May ===
| Date | Name | Moving from | Moving to | Fee |
|---|---|---|---|---|
| 1 February 2016 (Note: The player's contract will be effective on 1 July 2016) | (Argentina) Lucas Boyé | (Argentina) Newell's Old Boys | Torino | Undisclosed |
| 30 March 2016 | (Croatia) Ante Budimir | (Germany) St. Pauli | Crotone | Undisclosed (Note: The player already played for his new club in 2015–16 season, the deal turned from temporary to definitive.) |
| 30 March 2016 | (Gabon) Mario Lemina | (France) Marseille | Juventus | €9.5M |
| 9 May 2016 | (Tunisia) Hamdi Harbaoui | (Belgium) Lokeren | Udinese | Free |
| 23 May 2016 | Lorenzo Tonelli | Empoli | Napoli | Undisclosed |
| 30 May 2016 | (Germany) Antonio Rüdiger | (Germany) Stuttgart | Roma | €9M |
| 30 May 2016 | Manuel Pasqual | Fiorentina | Empoli | Free |

=== June ===
| Date | Name | Moving from | Moving to | Fee |
|---|---|---|---|---|
| 1 June 2016 | (Turkey) Caner Erkin | (Turkey) Fenerbahçe | Inter | Free |
| 4 June 2016 | (Chile) Manuel Iturra | Udinese | (Mexico) Necaxa | Undisclosed |
| 6 June 2016 | (Portugal) Bruno Alves | (Turkey) Fenerbahçe | Cagliari | Free |
| 7 June 2016 | (Denmark) Simon Makienok | Palermo | (England) Preston North End | Loan |
| 8 June 2016 | Maurizio Domizzi | Udinese | Venezia | Free |
| 9 June 2016 | Ivan Pedrelli | Rimini | Cittadella | Free |
| 10 June 2016 | Luca Strizzolo | Pordenone | Cittadella | Free |
| 13 June 2016 | (Bosnia and Herzegovina) Miralem Pjanić | Roma | Juventus | €32M |
| 14 June 2016 | Andrea La Mantia | Cosenza | Pro Vercelli | Undisclosed |
| 15 June 2016 | (Croatia) Stipe Perica | (England) Chelsea | Udinese | Undisclosed |
| 15 June 2016 | (Switzerland) Matteo Fedele | (Switzerland) Sion | Carpi | Undisclosed |
| 16 June 2016 | (Switzerland) Roberto Rodríguez | Novara | (Switzerland) Zürich | Undisclosed |
| 17 June 2016 | Alberto Paloschi | (Wales) Swansea City | Atalanta | Undisclosed |
| 17 June 2016 | (Brazil) Gabriel Appelt Pires | Juventus | (Spain) Leganés | Undisclosed |
| 17 June 2016 | Cristian Buonaiuto | Pescara | Perugia | Free |
| 21 June 2016 | (Slovakia) Norbert Gyömbér | Catania | Roma | €1.5M |
| 21 June 2016 | (Spain) Álvaro Morata | Juventus | (Spain) Real Madrid | €30M |
| 21 June 2016 | Stephan El Shaarawy | Milan | Roma | €13M |
| 21 June 2016 | (Nigeria) Umar Sadiq | Spezia | Roma | Undisclosed |
| 21 June 2016 | (Nigeria) Nura Abdullahi | Spezia | Roma | Undisclosed |
| 21 June 2016 | Marco Crimi | Bologna | Carpi | Undisclosed |
| 22 June 2016 | (Croatia) Bruno Petković | Catania | Trapani | Undisclosed |
| 22 June 2016 | (Brazil) Igor Coronado | (Malta) Floriana | Trapani | Undisclosed |
| 22 June 2016 | (Belgium) Stephane Omeonga | (Belgium) Anderlecht | Avellino | Undisclosed |
| 22 June 2016 | (Poland) Paweł Wszołek | Sampdoria | Verona | Undisclosed |
| 22 June 2016 | (Liechtenstein) Marcel Büchel | Juventus | Empoli | Undisclosed |
| 22 June 2016 | (Ghana) Moses Odjer | Catania | Salernitana | Undisclosed |
| 23 June 2016 | (Croatia) Duje Javorčić | (Croatia) RNK Split | Lazio | Undisclosed |
| 23 June 2016 | (France) Seko Fofana | (England) Manchester City | Udinese | Undisclosed |
| 23 June 2016 | Loris Bacchetti | Catania | Pro Vercelli | Undisclosed |
| 23 June 2016 | Francesco Caputo | Cittadella | Virtus Entella | Undisclosed |
| 23 June 2016 | Michele Pellizzer | Cittadella | Virtus Entella | Undisclosed |
| 23 June 2016 | (Slovakia) Ľubomír Tupta | Catania | Verona | Undisclosed |
| 23 June 2016 | (Guinea) Oumar Toure | Santarcangelo | Juventus | Undisclosed |
| 24 June 2016 | (Brazil) Jadson | Udinese | (Brazil) Santa Cruz | Loan |
| 24 June 2016 | Fabrizio Brignani | Cremonese | Bologna | Undisclosed |
| 24 June 2016 | (Albania) Rey Manaj | Cremonese | Inter | Undisclosed |
| 24 June 2016 | Luca Tremolada | Arezzo | Virtus Entella | Free |
| 24 June 2016 | (Slovakia) Jakub Hromada | Sampdoria | (Czech Republic) Viktoria Plzeň | Loan |
| 24 June 2016 | Paolo Frascatore | Roma | (Switzerland) Lausanne | Loan |
| 24 June 2016 | Francesco Margiotta | Juventus | (Switzerland) Lausanne | Loan |
| 25 June 2016 | Valerio Verre | Udinese | Pescara | Undisclosed |
| 25 June 2016 | Gianluca Lapadula | Pescara | Milan | Undisclosed |
| 27 June 2016 | Giuseppe Fornito | Rimini | Trapani | Undisclosed |
| 27 June 2016 | Federico Di Francesco | Lanciano | Bologna | Undisclosed |
| 27 June 2016 | (Romania) Deian Boldor | Lanciano | Bologna | Undisclosed |
| 27 June 2016 | Bryan Cristante | (Portugal) Benfica | Pescara | Loan |
| 28 June 2016 | (Ivory Coast) Seydou Doumbia | Roma | (Switzerland) Basel | Loan |
| 28 June 2016 | Emanuele Rovini | Udinese | Pistoiese | Loan |
| 28 June 2016 | (Ukraine) Vasyl Pryima | Torino | Frosinone | Free |
| 28 June 2016 | (Brazil) Matheus Pereira | (Brazil) Corinthians | Empoli | Undisclosed |
| 28 June 2016 | Housem Ferchichi | Palermo | Livorno | Loan |
| 28 June 2016 | Roberto Pirrello | Palermo | Livorno | Loan |
| 28 June 2016 | Davide Petermann | Palermo | Teramo | Loan |
| 28 June 2016 | (Brazil) Dani Alves | (Spain) Barcelona | Juventus | Free |
| 29 June 2016 | Mirco Antenucci | (England) Leeds United | S.P.A.L. | Free |
| 29 June 2016 | (Argentina) José María Basanta | Fiorentina | (Mexico) Monterrey | Undisclosed |
| 29 June 2016 | Matteo Legittimo | Lecce | Trapani | Undisclosed |
| 29 June 2016 | Simone Pontisso | Udinese | S.P.A.L. | Loan |
| 29 June 2016 | (Argentina) Lucas Ocampos | (France) Marseille | Genoa | Loan |
| 29 June 2016 | Andrea Nalini | Salernitana | Crotone | Undisclosed |
| 30 June 2016 | (Poland) Bartłomiej Drągowski | (Poland) Jagiellonia Białystok | Fiorentina | Undisclosed |
| 30 June 2016 | (Croatia) Ante Rebić | Fiorentina | (Germany) Eintracht Frankfurt | Loan |
| 30 June 2016 | (Moldova) Artur Ioniță | Verona | Cagliari | Undisclosed |
| 30 June 2016 | Andrea Arrighini | Avellino | Cittadella | Loan |
| 30 June 2016 | Giuseppe Panico | Genoa | Cesena | 2-year loan |
| 30 June 2016 | Francesco Renzetti | Cesena | Genoa | Undisclosed |
| 30 June 2016 | Paolo Ghiglione | Genoa | S.P.A.L. | Loan |
| 30 June 2016 | Mario Gargiulo | Chievo | Lucchese | Loan |

=== July ===
| Date | Name | Moving from | Moving to | Fee |
|---|---|---|---|---|
| 1 July 2016 | Gabriele Angella | (England) Watford | Udinese | Undisclosed |
| 1 July 2016 | Giuseppe Bellusci | (England) Leeds United | Empoli | Loan |
| 1 July 2016 | Simone Pasa | Inter | Cittadella | Undisclosed |
| 1 July 2016 | (Colombia) Víctor Ibarbo | Cagliari | Panathinaikos | Loan |
| 1 July 2016 | Marco Perrotta | Pescara | Avellino | Loan |
| 1 July 2016 | Andrea Schiavone | Juventus | Cesena | Undisclosed |
| 1 July 2016 | Alberto Paleari | Giana Erminio | Cittadella | Undisclosed |
| 1 July 2016 | Federico Dimarco | Inter | Empoli | Loan |
| 1 July 2016 | Romano Perticone | Trapani | Cesena | Undisclosed |
| 1 July 2016 | Simone Benedetti | Cagliari | Virtus Entella | Undisclosed |
| 1 July 2016 | Davide Diaw | Tamai | Virtus Entella | Undisclosed |
| 1 July 2016 | Niccolò Belloni | Inter | Avellino | Loan |
| 1 July 2016 | Gianluca Litteri | Latina | Cittadella | Undisclosed |
| 1 July 2016 | (Serbia) Uroš Radaković | Bologna | (Czech Republic) Sigma Olomouc | Undisclosed |
| 2 July 2016 | (Croatia) Marko Pajač | (Slovenia) Celje | Cagliari | Undisclosed |
| 2 July 2016 | Giuseppe Mastinu | Olbia | Spezia | Undisclosed |
| 2 July 2016 | Stefano Sorrentino | Palermo | Chievo | Free |
| 2 July 2016 | (Senegal) Joel Baraye | Brescia | Virtus Entella | Undisclosed |
| 2 July 2016 | Simone Colombi | Cagliari | Carpi | Loan (Note: This is a deal with an obligation to automatically buy the player at the end of the loan) |
| 4 July 2016 | Francesco Bardi | Inter | Frosinone | Loan |
| 4 July 2016 | (The Gambia) Lamin Jawo | Finale | Carpi | Undisclosed |
| 4 July 2016 | (Spain) Fernando Torres | Milan | (Spain) Atlético Madrid | Free |
| 4 July 2016 | Davide Marsura | Udinese | Venezia | Undisclosed |
| 4 July 2016 | (Croatia) Robert Kristo | Spezia | Osnabrück | Undisclosed |
| 4 July 2016 | Simone Padoin | Juventus | Cagliari | Undisclosed |
| 4 July 2016 | (Poland) Rafał Wolski | Fiorentina | (Poland) Lechia Gdańsk | Undisclosed |
| 4 July 2016 | (Poland) Kamil Glik | Torino | (France) Monaco | Loan |
| 4 July 2016 | (Netherlands) Marten de Roon | Atalanta | (England) Middlesbrough | Undisclosed |
| 4 July 2016 | (Spain) Jaime Romero | Udinese | (Spain) Osasuna | Free |
| 4 July 2016 | Marco Calderoni | Chievo | Novara | Loan |
| 4 July 2016 | (Brazil) Filipe Gomes | Perugia | Padova | Undisclosed |
| 4 July 2016 | (Colombia) Andrés Tello | Juventus | Empoli | Loan |
| 4 July 2016 | (Brazil) Gerson | (Brazil) Fluminense | Roma | Undisclosed |
| 4 July 2016 | (Brazil) Edimar Fraga | Chievo | (Brazil) Cruzeiro | Undisclosed |
| 5 July 2016 | (Croatia) Šime Vrsaljko | Sassuolo | (Spain) Atlético Madrid | Undisclosed |
| 5 July 2016 | Nicola Falasco | Roma | Cesena | Loan |
| 5 July 2016 | (Greece) Vangelis Moras | Verona | Bari | Free |
| 5 July 2016 | Guglielmo Vicario | Udinese | Venezia | Undisclosed |
| 5 July 2016 | Sacha Cori | Cesena | Santarcangelo | Undisclosed |
| 5 July 2016 | (Croatia) Ante Budimir | Crotone | Sampdoria | Undisclosed |
| 5 July 2016 | (Poland) Tomasz Kupisz | Chievo | Novara | Loan |
| 5 July 2016 | Matteo Ricci | Roma | Perugia | Loan |
| 5 July 2016 | Michele Camporese | Empoli | Benevento | Undisclosed |
| 5 July 2016 | Filippo Falco | Bologna | Benevento | Loan |
| 5 July 2016 | Lorenzo Laverone | Vicenza | Salernitana | Free |
| 5 July 2016 | Luigi Vitale | Ternana | Salernitana | Free |
| 5 July 2016 | Giuseppe Caccavallo | Paganese | Salernitana | Free |
| 5 July 2016 | Amedeo Benedetti | Chievo | Cittadella | Loan |
| 5 July 2016 | Daniele Sarzi Puttini | Carpi | Südtirol | Loan |
| 6 July 2016 | (Brazil) Ewandro | (Brazil) São Paulo | Udinese | Undisclosed |
| 6 July 2016 | (Argentina) Albano Bizzarri | Chievo | Pescara | Free |
| 6 July 2016 | Mattia Vitale | Juventus | Cesena | Loan |
| 6 July 2016 | (Argentina) Éver Banega | (Spain) Sevilla | Inter | Free |
| 6 July 2016 | (Netherlands) Kevin Diks | (Netherlands) Vitesse | Fiorentina | Undisclosed |
| 6 July 2016 | Giacomo Calò | Sampdoria | Pontedera | Loan |
| 6 July 2016 | (Ghana) Isaac Donkor | Inter | Avellino | Loan |
| 6 July 2016 | Riccardo Cazzola | Atalanta | Alessandria | Undisclosed |
| 6 July 2016 | Andrea Catellani | Spezia | Carpi | Loan |
| 6 July 2016 | Enrico Baldini | Inter | Pro Vercelli | Loan |
| 6 July 2016 | (Brazil) Alisson | (Brazil) Internacional | Roma | €8M |
| 6 July 2016 | (Hungary) Bálint Vécsei | Bologna | (Switzerland) Lugano | Loan |
| 6 July 2016 | Federico Ceccherini | Livorno | Crotone | Undisclosed |
| 6 July 2016 | (France) Sebastian De Maio | Genoa | (Belgium) Anderlecht | Undisclosed |
| 6 July 2016 | Nicola Stefanelli | Virtus Entella | Renate | Loan |
| 6 July 2016 | Lorenzo Vasco | Roma | Südtirol | Loan |
| 7 July 2016 | Davide Luppi | Modena | Verona | Undisclosed |
| 7 July 2016 | (Serbia) Željko Brkić | Udinese | (Greece) PAOK | Undisclosed |
| 7 July 2016 | Alberto Gilardino | Palermo | Empoli | Free |
| 7 July 2016 | Andrea Palazzi | Inter | Pro Vercelli | Loan |
| 7 July 2016 | Leonardo Spinazzola | Juventus | Atalanta | 2-year loan |
| 7 July 2016 | Felice Evacuo | Novara | Parma | Free |
| 7 July 2016 | Matteo Mancosu | Bologna | (Canada) Montreal Impact | Loan |
| 7 July 2016 | Roberto Ogunseye | Inter | Prato | Loan |
| 7 July 2016 | Doudou Mangni | Atalanta | (Portugal) Olhanense | Loan |
| 7 July 2016 | Gianmarco Gerevini | Bologna | (Portugal) Olhanense | Loan |
| 7 July 2016 | (Croatia) Josip Elez | Lazio | (Croatia) HNK Rijeka | Loan |
| 7 July 2016 | Ferdinando Mastroianni | Este | Carpi | Undisclosed |
| 7 July 2016 | Nicola Leali | Juventus | (Greece) Olympiacos | Loan |
| 7 July 2016 | Hicham Kanis | AlbinoLeffe | Novara | Free |
| 7 July 2016 | (Switzerland) Zoran Josipovic | Juventus | (Switzerland) Aarau | Undisclosed |
| 7 July 2016 | (Switzerland) Philippe Koch | (Switzerland) Zürich | Novara | Free |
| 7 July 2016 | (Czech Republic) Ladislav Krejčí | (Czech Republic) Sparta Prague | Bologna | Loan |
| 7 July 2016 | (Spain) Marcelo Djaló | Juventus | (Spain) Lugo | Loan |
| 7 July 2016 | (Bolivia) Sebastián Gamarra | Milan | FeralpiSalò | Undisclosed |
| 7 July 2016 | (Venezuela) Manuel Arteaga | Palermo | (Bolivia) The Strongest | Loan |
| 8 July 2016 | (Brazil) Rafael | Verona | Cagliari | Undisclosed |
| 8 July 2016 | Marco Ezio Fossati | Cagliari | Verona | Loan |
| 8 July 2016 | Luigi Canotto | Melfi | Trapani | Free |
| 8 July 2016 | Pierluigi Gollini | Verona | (England) Aston Villa | Undisclosed |
| 8 July 2016 | Gianluca Caprari | Pescara | Inter | Undisclosed |
| 8 July 2016 | Gianluca Caprari | Inter | Pescara | Loan |
| 8 July 2016 | (France) Guillaume Gigliotti | Foggia | Ascoli | Undisclosed |
| 8 July 2016 | Luca Crosta | Milan | Cagliari | Free |
| 8 July 2016 | Lorenzo Venuti | Fiorentina | Benevento | Loan |
| 8 July 2016 | (Morocco) Nabil Jaadi | Udinese | Ascoli | Loan |
| 8 July 2016 | (Colombia) Alexis Zapata | Udinese | Perugia | Loan |
| 8 July 2016 | (Sweden) Joakim Olausson | Unattached | Perugia | Free |
| 8 July 2016 | (Argentina) Franco Zuculini | Bologna | Verona | Free |
| 8 July 2016 | (Portugal) Mário Rui | Empoli | Roma | Loan |
| 8 July 2016 | (Bulgaria) Radoslav Kirilov | Chievo | (Bulgaria) Beroe Stara Zagora | Loan |
| 8 July 2016 | Ivan Provedel | Chievo | Pro Vercelli | Loan |
| 8 July 2016 | (Serbia) Lazar Petković | Padova | Carpi | Undisclosed |
| 8 July 2016 | Andrea Mazzarani | Modena | Crotone | Free |
| 8 July 2016 | Fabio Ceravolo | Ternana | Benevento | Free |
| 8 July 2016 | Filippo Perucchini | Bologna | Benevento | Loan |
| 8 July 2016 | Gennaro Armeno | Ischia | Novara | Undisclosed |
| 8 July 2016 | Alex Rolfini | Virtus Castelfranco | Carpi | Undisclosed |
| 8 July 2016 | (San Marino) Elia Benedettini | Pianese | Novara | Free |
| 8 July 2016 | Marco Martin | Pordenone | Cittadella | Undisclosed |
| 8 July 2016 | (Czech Republic) Stefan Simić | Milan | (Belgium) Royal Excel Mouscron | Loan |
| 8 July 2016 | Manuel Scavone | Pro Vercelli | Parma | Undisclosed |
| 8 July 2016 | (Senegal) Mohamed Coly | Pro Vercelli | Parma | Undisclosed |
| 8 July 2016 | (Venezuela) Rafael Romo | Udinese | (Cyprus) AEL Limassol | Free |
| 8 July 2016 | Francesco Nicastro | Juve Stabia | Pescara | Free |
| 8 July 2016 | Daniele Borra | Virtus Entella | Arezzo | Loan |
| 8 July 2016 | Luca Oneto | Virtus Entella | Santarcangelo | Loan |
| 8 July 2016 | Massimo Sammartino | Roma | Pistoiese | Loan |
| 8 July 2016 | Francesco Corsinelli | Genoa | Pontedera | Loan |
| 8 July 2016 | Wladimiro Falcone | Sampdoria | Livorno | Loan |
| 8 July 2016 | Marco Cellini | S.P.A.L. | Livorno | Undisclosed |
| 9 July 2016 | Lys Gomis | Torino | Lecce | Loan |
| 9 July 2016 | Stefano Antezza | Spezia | Como | Loan |
| 9 July 2016 | Marco Chiosa | Torino | Perugia | Loan |
| 9 July 2016 | (Finland) Niklas Moisander | Sampdoria | (Germany) Werder Bremen | Undisclosed |
| 9 July 2016 | (Croatia) Karlo Lulić | Sampdoria | (Croatia) Osijek | Loan |
| 9 July 2016 | Michael De Marchi | Cerea | Carpi | Undisclosed |
| 9 July 2016 | Marco Valotti | Brescia | Fidelis Andria | Loan |
| 9 July 2016 | Ernesto Starita | Pro Vercelli | Fidelis Andria | Loan |
| 10 July 2016 | Francesco Fedato | Sampdoria | Bari | Loan |
| 10 July 2016 | (Albania) Arlind Ajeti | Frosinone | Torino | Free |
| 10 July 2016 | (Romania) Ianis Hagi | (Romania) Viitorul Constanța | Fiorentina | Undisclosed |
| 10 July 2016 | (Brazil) Leandro Castán | Roma | Sampdoria | Loan |
| 10 July 2016 | (Argentina) Joaquín Correa | Sampdoria | (Spain) Sevilla | Undisclosed |
| 11 July 2016 | Simone Verdi | Milan | Bologna | Undisclosed |
| 11 July 2016 | (Albania) Rey Manaj | Inter | Pescara | Loan |
| 11 July 2016 | Cristiano Biraghi | Inter | Pescara | Undisclosed |
| 11 July 2016 | (Morocco) Soufiane Bidaoui | Latina | Avellino | Undisclosed |
| 11 July 2016 | (Venezuela) Adalberto Peñaranda | (England) Watford | Udinese | Loan |
| 11 July 2016 | Carlo Pelagatti | Catania | Cittadella | Undisclosed |
| 11 July 2016 | Simone Farelli | Latina | Trapani | Free |
| 11 July 2016 | Luca Crecco | Lazio | Trapani | Loan |
| 11 July 2016 | Guido Guerrieri | Lazio | Trapani | Loan |
| 11 July 2016 | (Kosovo) Samir Ujkani | Genoa | Pisa | Loan |
| 11 July 2016 | (Argentina) Santiago Colombatto | Cagliari | Pisa | Loan |
| 11 July 2016 | Gennaro Scognamiglio | Trapani | Pisa | Undisclosed |
| 11 July 2016 | Massimiliano Gatto | Chievo | Pisa | Loan |
| 11 July 2016 | Andrea Tabanelli | Cesena | Pisa | Loan |
| 11 July 2016 | Dario Del Fabro | Cagliari | Pisa | Loan |
| 11 July 2016 | Alessandro Longhi | Sassuolo | Pisa | Free |
| 11 July 2016 | Ludovico Gargiulo | Empoli | Pistoiese | Loan |
| 12 July 2016 | (Argentina) Facundo Roncaglia | Fiorentina | (Spain) Celta de Vigo | Free |
| 12 July 2016 | (Uruguay) Juan Surraco | Lecce | Ternana | Free |
| 12 July 2016 | Richard Marcone | Trapani | Südtirol | Loan |
| 12 July 2016 | Claudio Sparacello | Trapani | Südtirol | Loan |
| 12 July 2016 | Filippo Bandinelli | Fiorentina | Latina | Undisclosed |
| 12 July 2016 | (Australia) Joshua Brillante | Fiorentina | (Australia) Sydney | Undisclosed |
| 12 July 2016 | (Senegal) Maodo Malick Mbaye | Chievo | Carpi | Loan |
| 12 July 2016 | Simone Andrea Ganz | Juventus | Verona | Loan |
| 12 July 2016 | Alessandro Crescenzi | Roma | Pescara | Undisclosed |
| 12 July 2016 | Fabrizio Alastra | Palermo | Matera | Loan |
| 12 July 2016 | Rosario Costantino | Palermo | Gubbio | Loan |
| 12 July 2016 | Andrea Accardi | Palermo | Modena | Loan |
| 12 July 2016 | Marco Albertoni | Genoa | Pistoiese | Loan |
| 12 July 2016 | Alessandro Giacomel | Empoli | Pontedera | Loan |
| 12 July 2016 | Luca Barlocco | Juventus | Alessandria | Loan |
| 13 July 2016 | Luca Valzania | Atalanta | Cittadella | Loan |
| 13 July 2016 | Marco Soprano | Genoa | Bassano | Loan |
| 13 July 2016 | (Czech Republic) Patrik Schick | (Czech Republic) Sparta Prague | Sampdoria | Undisclosed |
| 13 July 2016 | Gian Filippo Felicioli | Milan | Ascoli | Loan |
| 13 July 2016 | Andrea Ferretti | Pavia | Trapani | Undisclosed |
| 13 July 2016 | Gianluca Sansone | Sampdoria | Novara | Undisclosed |
| 13 July 2016 | (Iceland) Hörður Magnússon | Juventus | (England) Bristol City | Loan |
| 13 July 2016 | Daniele Sciaudone | Salernitana | Spezia | Undisclosed |
| 13 July 2016 | (Mali) Alassane També | Genoa | (Portugal) Tondela | Undisclosed |
| 13 July 2016 | Morgan De Sanctis | Roma | (France) Monaco | Free |
| 13 July 2016 | Alessandro Piu | Empoli | Spezia | Loan |
| 13 July 2016 | Stefano Padovan | Juventus | Foggia | Loan |
| 13 July 2016 | Davide Agazzi | Atalanta | Foggia | Loan |
| 13 July 2016 | Felice Piccolo | Spezia | Alessandria | Free |
| 13 July 2016 | Gabriel Lunetta | Atalanta | Gubbio | Loan |
| 14 July 2016 | (Brazil) Gabriel Silva | Udinese | (Spain) Granada | Loan |
| 14 July 2016 | Mariano Arini | Avellino | S.P.A.L. | Undisclosed |
| 14 July 2016 | (Hungary) Ádám Nagy | (Hungary) Ferencvárosi | Bologna | Undisclosed |
| 14 July 2016 | Lorenzo Tassi | Inter | Avellino | Loan |
| 14 July 2016 | Salvatore Caturano | Bari | Lecce | Loan |
| 14 July 2016 | (Paraguay) Iván Piris | Udinese | (Mexico) Monterrey | Undisclosed |
| 14 July 2016 | Alex Meret | Udinese | S.P.A.L. | Loan |
| 14 July 2016 | (Bulgaria) Antonio Vutov | Udinese | Lecce | Loan |
| 14 July 2016 | (Brazil) Juan Jesus | Inter | Roma | Loan |
| 14 July 2016 | Enrico Bearzotti | Verona | Arezzo | Loan |
| 14 July 2016 | Francesco Karkalis | Pescara | Teramo | Loan |
| 14 July 2016 | Tomasch Calore | Pescara | Teramo | Loan |
| 14 July 2016 | Gianluca Barba | Pescara | Piacenza | Loan |
| 14 July 2016 | (Morocco) Hachim Mastour | Milan | Zwolle | Loan |
| 15 July 2016 | (Morocco) Medhi Benatia | (Germany) Bayern Munich | Juventus | Loan |
| 15 July 2016 | Gianmarco Zigoni | Milan | S.P.A.L. | Loan |
| 15 July 2016 | Matteo Pessina | Milan | Como | Loan |
| 15 July 2016 | Mario Sampirisi | Vicenza | Crotone | Free |
| 15 July 2016 | (Bulgaria) Aleksandar Tonev | Frosinone | Crotone | Free |
| 15 July 2016 | (Ghana) Yussif Raman Chibsah | Sassuolo | Benevento | Loan |
| 15 July 2016 | Gianmario Comi | Milan | Carpi | Undisclosed |
| 15 July 2016 | Alessio Cragno | Cagliari | Benevento | Loan |
| 15 July 2016 | (Romania) George Pușcaș | Inter | Benevento | Loan |
| 15 July 2016 | (Ghana) Bright Gyamfi | Inter | Benevento | Loan |
| 15 July 2016 | Giorgio Piacentini | Milan | Como | Undisclosed |
| 15 July 2016 | (Albania) Olger Merkaj | Sampdoria | Tuttocuoio | Loan |
| 15 July 2016 | (Hungary) Ákos Kecskés | Atalanta | (Hungary) Újpest | Loan |
| 15 July 2016 | Luigi Giorgi | Atalanta | Ascoli | Undisclosed |
| 15 July 2016 | Janis Cavagna | Atalanta | Bassano | Loan |
| 15 July 2016 | Davide Agazzi | Atalanta | Foggia | Loan |
| 15 July 2016 | Mirco Miori | Atalanta | Piacenza | Loan |
| 15 July 2016 | Christian Mora | Atalanta | Renate | Loan |
| 15 July 2016 | (Uruguay) Rubén Bentancourt | Atalanta | Unattached | Released |
| 15 July 2016 | Roberto Ranieri | Atalanta | Cosenza | Loan |
| 15 July 2016 | Francesco Rossi | Atalanta | Teramo | Loan |
| 15 July 2016 | Fabio Eguelfi | Inter | Pro Vercelli | Loan |
| 15 July 2016 | Nicolas La Vigna | Atalanta | Piacenza | Loan |
| 15 July 2016 | Jacopo Petriccione | Fiorentina | Ternana | Loan |
| 15 July 2016 | Alex Redolfi | Atalanta | (Portugal) Olhanense | Loan |
| 15 July 2016 | Antonio Palma | Atalanta | Renate | Loan |
| 15 July 2016 | Fabio Castellano | Atalanta | Pro Vercelli | Loan |
| 15 July 2016 | (Bosnia and Herzegovina) Andrej Modić | Milan | Brescia | Loan |
| 15 July 2016 | Andrea Vassallo | Bologna | Brescia | 2-year loan |
| 15 July 2016 | Michele Messina | Atalanta | Parma | Loan |
| 15 July 2016 | Luca Milesi | Atalanta | Arezzo | Loan |
| 15 July 2016 | Nadir Minotti | Atalanta | Sambenedettese | Loan |
| 15 July 2016 | Stefano Cason | Atalanta | Ternana | Loan |
| 15 July 2016 | Alessio Vita | Sassuolo | Vicenza | Loan |
| 15 July 2016 | Antonio Balzano | Cagliari | Cesena | Loan |
| 15 July 2016 | Matteo Brighi | Bologna | Perugia | Free |
| 15 July 2016 | (Brazil) Marquinho | Udinese | (Brazil) Fluminense | Undisclosed |
| 15 July 2016 | (Paraguay) Antonio Sanabria | Roma | (Spain) Real Betis | €7,5M |
| 15 July 2016 | Jacopo Manconi | Novara | Reggiana | Loan |
| 15 July 2016 | Alberto Gallinetta | Juventus | Santarcangelo | Loan |
| 16 July 2016 | Daniele Verde | Roma | Avellino | Loan |
| 16 July 2016 | (Colombia) Juan Camilo Zúñiga | Napoli | (England) Watford | Loan |
| 16 July 2016 | Emanuele Giaccherini | (England) Sunderland | Napoli | Undisclosed |
| 16 July 2016 | (Sweden) Melker Hallberg | Udinese | Ascoli | Loan |
| 16 July 2016 | (Romania) Mihai Bălașa | Roma | Trapani | Loan |
| 16 July 2016 | (Serbia) Boris Radunović | Atalanta | Avellino | Loan |
| 16 July 2016 | Samuele Longo | Inter | (Spain) Girona | Loan |
| 16 July 2016 | (Brazil) Guilherme | Udinese | (Spain) Deportivo La Coruña | Loan |
| 16 July 2016 | Claudio Morra | Torino | Pro Vercelli | Undisclosed |
| 16 July 2016 | (Spain) Sergio Postigo | Spezia | (Spain) Levante | Loan |
| 16 July 2016 | (Croatia) Marko Dabro | Fiorentina | (Croatia) Cibalia | Undisclosed |
| 16 July 2016 | (Ivory Coast) Dramane Konaté | Empoli | Pro Vercelli | Free |
| 17 July 2016 | (Romania) Ionuț Pop | Roma | Fidelis Andria | Loan |
| 17 July 2016 | Dimitri Bisoli | Fidelis Andria | Brescia | Loan |
| 18 July 2016 | (Brazil) Fernando | Sampdoria | (Russia) Spartak Moscow | Undisclosed |
| 18 July 2016 | Lorenzo Carissoni | Torino | Trapani | Loan |
| 18 July 2016 | Davide Di Quinzio | S.P.A.L. | Como | Undisclosed |
| 18 July 2016 | Flavio Lazzari | Novara | Ascoli | Undisclosed |
| 18 July 2016 | (Spain) Iago Falque | Roma | Torino | Loan |
| 18 July 2016 | (Serbia) Adem Ljajić | Roma | Torino | Undisclosed |
| 18 July 2016 | Matteo Procopio | Torino | Cremonese | Loan |
| 18 July 2016 | Giuseppe De Luca | Atalanta | Bari | Loan |
| 18 July 2016 | Giovanni Crociata | Milan | Brescia | Loan |
| 18 July 2016 | Giovanni Graziano | Torino | Renate | Loan |
| 18 July 2016 | Luca Forte | Pescara | Teramo | Loan |
| 18 July 2016 | Michael Agazzi | Milan | Cesena | Undisclosed |
| 18 July 2016 | Andrea Razzitti | Brescia | Piacenza | Loan |
| 18 July 2016 | Jacopo Segre | Torino | Piacenza | Loan |
| 18 July 2016 | Giacomo Sciacca | Inter | Piacenza | Loan |
| 18 July 2016 | Valerio Nava | Atalanta | Catania | Loan |
| 18 July 2016 | (Serbia) David Milinković | Genoa | Messina | Loan |
| 18 July 2016 | Ettore Marchi | Pro Vercelli | Reggiana | Undisclosed |
| 18 July 2016 | Mattia Lombardo | Pro Vercelli | Reggiana | Undisclosed |
| 18 July 2016 | Davide Di Molfetta | Milan | Prato | Loan |
| 19 July 2016 | (Argentina) Santiago Gentiletti | Lazio | Genoa | Undisclosed |
| 19 July 2016 | Antonio Cinelli | Cagliari | Chievo | Free |
| 19 July 2016 | (Uruguay) Alejandro González | Verona | Avellino | Loan |
| 19 July 2016 | (Switzerland) Daniel Pavlović | (Switzerland) Grasshoppers | Sampdoria | Free |
| 19 July 2016 | Kevin Bonifazi | Torino | S.P.A.L. | Loan |
| 19 July 2016 | Antonino La Gumina | Palermo | Ternana | Loan |
| 19 July 2016 | Lorenzo Marchionni | Chievo | Pro Piacenza | Undisclosed |
| 19 July 2016 | (Ghana) Isaac Ntow | Chievo | Sambenedettese | Undisclosed |
| 19 July 2016 | Franco Vázquez | Palermo | (Spain) Sevilla | Undisclosed |
| 19 July 2016 | Marco Berardi | Fiorentina | Tuttocuoio | Loan |
| 19 July 2016 | Stefano Beltrame | Juventus | (Netherlands) Den Bosch | Undisclosed |
| 20 July 2016 | (Argentina) Rodrigo De Paul | (Spain) Valencia | Udinese | Undisclosed |
| 20 July 2016 | Alberto Brignoli | Juventus | (Spain) Leganés | Loan |
| 20 July 2016 | (Albania) Armando Vajushi | Chievo | Pro Vercelli | Undisclosed |
| 20 July 2016 | Matteo Grandi | Cesena | Catanzaro | Loan |
| 20 July 2016 | Gabriele Marchegiani | Roma | S.P.A.L. | Undisclosed |
| 20 July 2016 | Marco Sansovini | Pescara | Teramo | Undisclosed |
| 20 July 2016 | Enrico Guarna | Bari | Foggia | Loan |
| 20 July 2016 | Giuseppe Rizzo | Perugia | Vicenza | Loan |
| 20 July 2016 | Carlo Pinsoglio | Juventus | Latina | Loan |
| 20 July 2016 | (Spain) Pol García | Juventus | Latina | Loan |
| 20 July 2016 | Luca Cigarini | Atalanta | Sampdoria | Undisclosed |
| 20 July 2016 | (Argentina) Nicolás López | Udinese | (Brazil) Internacional | Undisclosed |
| 20 July 2016 | Francesco Di Mariano | Roma | Novara | Undisclosed |
| 20 July 2016 | Alessandro Bassoli | Verona | Südtirol | Loan |
| 20 July 2016 | Ettore Gliozzi | Sassuolo | Südtirol | Loan |
| 20 July 2016 | (Senegal) Abou Diop | Torino | Viterbese | Loan |
| 20 July 2016 | Matteo Ricci | Empoli | (Portugal) Olhanense | Loan |
| 20 July 2016 | (Greece) Anastasios Donis | Juventus | (France) Nice | Loan |
| 21 July 2016 | (Nigeria) Simy | (Portugal) Portimonense | Crotone | Undisclosed |
| 21 July 2016 | (Guinea) Gaston Camara | Inter | Brescia | Loan |
| 21 July 2016 | (Greece) Albert Roussos | Juventus | (Greece) Iraklis | Undisclosed |
| 21 July 2016 | (Romania) Răzvan Popa | Inter | (Spain) Real Zaragoza | Undisclosed |
| 21 July 2016 | Michele Rigione | Lanciano | Cesena | Free |
| 21 July 2016 | (Bosnia and Herzegovina) Ervin Zukanović | Roma | Atalanta | Loan |
| 21 July 2016 | (Romania) Gabriel Torje | Udinese | (Russia) Terek Grozny | Undisclosed |
| 21 July 2016 | Fausto Coppola | Virtus Entella | Akragas | Loan |
| 21 July 2016 | Eric Lanini | Juventus | (Belgium) Westerlo | Loan |
| 21 July 2016 | Leonardo Blanchard | Frosinone | Carpi | Undisclosed |
| 21 July 2016 | Andrea Gemignani | Empoli | Pontedera | Loan |
| 22 July 2016 | (Serbia) Filip Đuričić | (Portugal) Benfica | Sampdoria | Loan |
| 22 July 2016 | Federico Bonazzoli | Sampdoria | Brescia | Loan |
| 22 July 2016 | (Brazil) Caio De Cenco | Pavia | Trapani | Undisclosed |
| 22 July 2016 | Luca Cecchini | Virtus Entella | Lucchese | Undisclosed |
| 22 July 2016 | (Belgium) Jordan Lukaku | (Belgium) Oostende | Lazio | Undisclosed |
| 22 July 2016 | (Serbia) Petar Golubović | Roma | Pisa | Loan |
| 22 July 2016 | Lorenzo Filippini | Lazio | Cesena | Loan |
| 22 July 2016 | Francesco Forte | Inter | Lucchese | Loan |
| 22 July 2016 | Alessandro Ligi | Bari | Cesena | Undisclosed |
| 22 July 2016 | Luca Di Matteo | Lanciano | Latina | Free |
| 22 July 2016 | (Kazakhstan) Alexander Merkel | Udinese | Pisa | Loan |
| 22 July 2016 | (Ghana) Patrick Asmah | Atalanta | Avellino | Loan |
| 22 July 2016 | Emmanuel Gyasi | Torino | Pistoiese | Undisclosed |
| 22 July 2016 | Federico Proia | Torino | Pistoiese | Undisclosed |
| 22 July 2016 | Raffaele Pucino | Chievo | Vicenza | Loan |
| 22 July 2016 | Giammario Piscitella | Roma | Catania | Loan |
| 22 July 2016 | Tiziano Tulissi | Atalanta | Modena | Loan |
| 22 July 2016 | King Udoh | Juventus | Pontedera | Loan |
| 22 July 2016 | Luca Antonini | Ascoli | Prato | Free |
| 23 July 2016 | (Netherlands) Fabian Sporkslede | Chievo | NAC Breda | Undisclosed |
| 23 July 2016 | Raffaele Imparato | Maceratese | Perugia | Undisclosed |
| 24 July 2016 | (Argentina) Pablo Andrés González | Novara | Alessandria | Undisclosed |
| 25 July 2016 | (Argentina) Juan Sánchez Miño | Torino | (Argentina) Independiente | Undisclosed |
| 25 July 2016 | Alessandro Martinelli | Sampdoria | Brescia | Loan |
| 25 July 2016 | (Venezuela) Andrés Ponce | Sampdoria | (Switzerland) Lugano | Loan |
| 25 July 2016 | (Argentina) Mariano Andújar | Napoli | (Argentina) Estudiantes | Undisclosed |
| 25 July 2016 | (Romania) Sergiu Suciu | Torino | Pordenone | Undisclosed |
| 25 July 2016 | Timothy Nocchi | Juventus | Tuttocuoio | Loan |
| 25 July 2016 | Michele Cremonesi | Crotone | S.P.A.L. | Loan |
| 25 July 2016 | Stefano Pellini | Juventus | Tuttocuoio | Loan |
| 25 July 2016 | Giorgio Siani | Juventus | Tuttocuoio | Loan |
| 25 July 2016 | (Serbia) Nenad Krstičić | Sampdoria | (Spain) Deportivo Alavés | Free |
| 25 July 2016 | (Argentina) Hernán Toledo | (Argentina) Vélez | Fiorentina | Loan |
| 25 July 2016 | Carlo Crialese | Cesena | Bassano | Loan |
| 25 July 2016 | Andrea Bandini | Inter | Mantova | Loan |
| 25 July 2016 | Fabrizio Danese | Nuorese | Chievo | Undisclosed |
| 25 July 2016 | Andrea Gulli | Genoa | Santarcangelo | Loan |
| 26 July 2016 | Iacopo Galli | Crotone | Spezia | Loan |
| 26 July 2016 | Valerio Mantovani | Torino | Salernitana | Undisclosed |
| 26 July 2016 | Mattia Cassani | Sampdoria | Bari | Undisclosed |
| 26 July 2016 | Daniele Altobelli | Frosinone | Pro Vercelli | Undisclosed |
| 26 July 2016 | (Argentina) Gonzalo Higuaín | Napoli | Juventus | €90M |
| 26 July 2016 | (France) Alexandre Coeff | Udinese | (France) Brest | 2-year loan |
| 26 July 2016 | Alan Empereur | Salernitana | Foggia | Undisclosed |
| 26 July 2016 | Alessandro Polidori | Pescara | Arezzo | Loan |
| 27 July 2016 | Agostino Camigliano | Udinese | Juve Stabia | Loan |
| 27 July 2016 | Ciro Immobile | (Spain) Sevilla | Lazio | Undisclosed |
| 27 July 2016 | (Montenegro) Marko Bakić | Fiorentina | (Portugal) Braga | Undisclosed |
| 27 July 2016 | (Croatia) Duje Čop | Cagliari | (Spain) Sporting de Gijón | Loan |
| 27 July 2016 | Tommaso Fantacci | Empoli | Padova | Loan |
| 27 July 2016 | Antonio Donnarumma | Genoa | (Greece) Asteras Tripolis | Free |
| 27 July 2016 | (Ivory Coast) Christian Kouamé | Prato | Cittadella | Loan |
| 28 July 2016 | (Argentina) Fabricio Fontanini | (Argentina) San Lorenzo | Vicenza | Free |
| 28 July 2016 | (Spain) Pol Lirola | Juventus | Sassuolo | 2-year loan |
| 28 July 2016 | (Switzerland) Fabio Daprelà | Carpi | Chievo | Free |
| 28 July 2016 | (Switzerland) Fabio Daprelà | Chievo | Bari | Loan |
| 28 July 2016 | Mattia Bani | Pro Vercelli | Chievo | Undisclosed |
| 28 July 2016 | Mattia Bani | Chievo | Pro Vercelli | Loan |
| 28 July 2016 | Emanuele Gatto | Chievo | Santarcangelo | Loan |
| 28 July 2016 | Nicolò Pozzebon | Juventus | (Netherlands) Groningen | Loan |
| 28 July 2016 | Simone Moschin | Pro Vercelli | Siena | Loan |
| 28 July 2016 | (Bosnia and Herzegovina) Dario Šarić | Carpi | Siena | Loan |
| 28 July 2016 | Marco Firenze | Crotone | Siena | Loan |
| 28 July 2016 | Aimone Calì | Lazio | Carrarese | Loan |
| 28 July 2016 | Federico Angiulli | Benevento | Reggiana | Undisclosed |
| 28 July 2016 | Simone Calvano | Verona | Reggiana | Loan |
| 28 July 2016 | Daniele Cardelli | Latina | Pisa | Undisclosed |
| 29 July 2016 | (Brazil) Wallace | (Portugal) Braga | Lazio | Undisclosed |
| 29 July 2016 | Alberto Torelli | Carpi | Carrarese | Loan |
| 29 July 2016 | Federico Franchini | Carpi | Maceratese | Loan |
| 29 July 2016 | Alex Rolfini | Carpi | Carrarese | Loan |
| 29 July 2016 | (Uruguay) Andrés Schetino | Fiorentina | (Spain) Sevilla Atlético | Loan |
| 29 July 2016 | Nicolò Brighenti | Vicenza | Frosinone | Undisclosed |
| 29 July 2016 | (Poland) Karol Linetty | (Poland) Lech Poznań | Sampdoria | Undisclosed |
| 29 July 2016 | Alfredo Bifulco | Napoli | Carpi | Loan |
| 29 July 2016 | (Argentina) Cristian Ansaldi | (Russia) Zenit Saint Petersburg | Genoa | Undisclosed |
| 29 July 2016 | (Serbia) Saša Lukić | (Serbia) Partizan | Torino | Loan |
| 29 July 2016 | Francesco Di Nolfo | Roma | Perugia | Undisclosed |
| 29 July 2016 | Michele Rocca | Sampdoria | Latina | Loan |
| 29 July 2016 | Gabriele Rolando | Sampdoria | Latina | Loan |
| 29 July 2016 | Roberto Criscuolo | Latina | Sampdoria | Undisclosed |
| 29 July 2016 | Roberto Criscuolo | Sampdoria | Latina | 2-year loan |
| 29 July 2016 | (Romania) Bogdan Mitrea | Ascoli | (Romania) Steaua București | Loan |
| 29 July 2016 | Marco Baldan | Perugia | Südtirol | Undisclosed |
| 29 July 2016 | (Albania) Entonjo Elezaj | Pro Vercelli | Perugia | Undisclosed |
| 29 July 2016 | Riccardo Barbuti | Pescara | Lumezzane | Undisclosed |
| 30 July 2016 | (Uruguay) Diego Laxalt | Inter | Genoa | Undisclosed |
| 30 July 2016 | (Argentina) Cristian Ansaldi | Genoa | Inter | Undisclosed |
| 30 July 2016 | (Hungary) Roland Sallai | (Hungary) Puskás Akadémia | Palermo | Loan |
| 30 July 2016 | Antonio Romano | Napoli | Prato | Loan |
| 30 July 2016 | Gennaro Tutino | Napoli | Carrarese | Loan |
| 30 July 2016 | (Brazil) Raphael Martinho | Carpi | Bari | Free |
| 31 July 2016 | (Portugal) Miguel Veloso | (Ukraine) Dynamo Kyiv | Genoa | Free |
| 31 July 2016 | Michael Ventre | Genoa | Siena | Loan |
| 31 July 2016 | Mirko Esposito | Crotone | Catanzaro | Loan |

=== August - September ===
| Date | Name | Moving from | Moving to | Fee |
|---|---|---|---|---|
| 1 August 2016 | Alberto Cerri | Juventus | S.P.A.L. | Loan |
| 1 August 2016 | (France) Jérémy Ménez | Milan | (France) Bordeaux | Undisclosed |
| 1 August 2016 | Gianluca Mancini | Fiorentina | Perugia | Undisclosed |
| 1 August 2016 | (Serbia) Slobodan Rajković | (Germany) Darmstadt | Palermo | Undisclosed |
| 1 August 2016 | Thomas Saloni | Spezia | Prato | Loan |
| 1 August 2016 | Gaetano Monachello | Atalanta | Bari | Loan |
| 1 August 2016 | Simone Palombi | Lazio | Ternana | Loan |
| 1 August 2016 | (Croatia) Anton Krešić | Atalanta | Trapani | Loan |
| 2 August 2016 | (Poland) Arkadiusz Milik | (Netherlands) Ajax | Napoli | Undisclosed |
| 2 August 2016 | Alessandro De Vitis | Sampdoria | Latina | Loan |
| 2 August 2016 | (Hungary) Atila Varga | Sampdoria | Latina | Loan |
| 2 August 2016 | Francesco Posocco | S.P.A.L. | Santarcangelo | Loan |
| 2 August 2016 | (Nigeria) Ogenyi Onazi | Lazio | (Turkey) Trabzonspor | Undisclosed |
| 2 August 2016 | Alessandro Gazzi | Torino | Palermo | Undisclosed |
| 2 August 2016 | Cristian Riggio | Crotone | Akragas | Loan |
| 2 August 2016 | Francesco Salvemini | Ternana | Akragas | Loan |
| 2 August 2016 | (Guinea) Alhassane Soumah | Juventus | (Belgium) Cercle Brugge | Loan |
| 2 August 2016 | (Kosovo) Drilon Cenaj | Chievo | Salernitana | Free |
| 2 August 2016 | Roberto Soriano | Sampdoria | (Spain) Villarreal | Undisclosed |
| 2 August 2016 | Giacomo Ferrazzo | Pordenone | Sampdoria | Undisclosed |
| 3 August 2016 | (Denmark) Søren Mussmann | (Denmark) SønderjyskE | Pro Vercelli | Free |
| 3 August 2016 | (Sweden) Marcus Rohdén | (Sweden) Elfsborg | Crotone | Undisclosed |
| 3 August 2016 | (Netherlands) Timo Letschert | (Netherlands) Utrecht | Sassuolo | Undisclosed |
| 3 August 2016 | Andrea Cocco | Pescara | Frosinone | Loan |
| 3 August 2016 | (Egypt) Mohamed Salah | (England) Chelsea | Roma | Undisclosed |
| 3 August 2016 | Patrick Ciurria | Spezia | Südtirol | Loan |
| 3 August 2016 | (Argentina) Federico Fazio | (England) Tottenham | Roma | Loan |
| 3 August 2016 | (France) Eddy Gnahoré | Napoli | Crotone | Loan |
| 3 August 2016 | Marco Borriello | Atalanta | Cagliari | Free |
| 3 August 2016 | Riccardo Gaiola | Inter | Padova | Loan |
| 3 August 2016 | Antonio Candreva | Lazio | Inter | Undisclosed |
| 3 August 2016 | (Poland) Błażej Augustyn | (Scotland) Hearts | Ascoli | Free |
| 3 August 2016 | (Ukraine) Vyacheslav Churko | (Ukraine) Shakhtar Donetsk | Frosinone | Loan |
| 3 August 2016 | Alessandro Mastalli | Milan | Juve Stabia | Undisclosed |
| 4 August 2016 | Giuseppe Torromino | Crotone | Lecce | Undisclosed |
| 4 August 2016 | Andrea Bovo | Salernitana | Reggiana | Undisclosed |
| 4 August 2016 | (Norway) Haitam Aleesami | (Sweden) Göteborg | Palermo | Loan |
| 4 August 2016 | (Poland) Wojciech Szczęsny | (England) Arsenal | Roma | Loan |
| 4 August 2016 | (Spain) Diego Capel | Genoa | (Belgium) Anderlecht | Undisclosed |
| 4 August 2016 | Gabriele Moncini | Cesena | Prato | Loan |
| 4 August 2016 | Emanuele Calaiò | Spezia | Parma | Undisclosed |
| 4 August 2016 | (Poland) Piotr Zieliński | Udinese | Napoli | Undisclosed |
| 4 August 2016 | (Guinea-Bissau) José Correia | Inter | (Portugal) Tondela | Loan |
| 4 August 2016 | Davide Voltan | Genoa | Ancona | Loan |
| 4 August 2016 | Stefano Pellizzari | Juventus | Carrarese | Loan |
| 4 August 2016 | Andrea Zaccagno | Torino | Pro Vercelli | Loan |
| 5 August 2016 | Paolo Bartolomei | Reggiana | Cittadella | Undisclosed |
| 5 August 2016 | (Greece) Panagiotis Tachtsidis | Genoa | Torino | Undisclosed |
| 5 August 2016 | (Argentina) Ezequiel Ponce | Roma | Granada | Loan |
| 5 August 2016 | Riccardo Melgrati | Cesena | Prato | Loan |
| 5 August 2016 | (Argentina) Tiago Casasola | Roma | Trapani | Loan |
| 5 August 2016 | (Equatorial Guinea) José Machín | Roma | Trapani | Loan |
| 5 August 2016 | (Paraguay) Gustavo Gómez | (Argentina) Lanús | Milan | Undisclosed |
| 5 August 2016 | Luca Parodi | Torino | FeralpiSalò | Undisclosed |
| 5 August 2016 | (Czech Republic) Michael Rabušic | Verona | (Czech Republic) Vysočina Jihlava | Undisclosed |
| 5 August 2016 | Massimiliano Busellato | Cittadella | Salernitana | Loan |
| 6 August 2016 | Luca Maniero | Crotone | Mantova | Loan |
| 6 August 2016 | Daniele Mignanelli | Pescara | Ascoli | Undisclosed |
| 6 August 2016 | Lorenzo Rosseti | Juventus | (Switzerland) Lugano | Loan |
| 6 August 2016 | Gennaro Scognamiglio | Pisa | Novara | Undisclosed |
| 7 August 2016 | Nicola Sansone | Sassuolo | (Spain) Villarreal | Undisclosed |
| 7 August 2016 | Osarimen Ebagua | Vicenza | Pro Vercelli | Free |
| 8 August 2016 | (Greece) Savvas Gentsoglou | Bari | (Croatia) Hajduk Split | Loan |
| 8 August 2016 | (Ecuador) Bryan Cabezas | (Ecuador) Independiente del Valle | Atalanta | Undisclosed |
| 8 August 2016 | Antonio Cinelli | Chievo | Cesena | Loan |
| 8 August 2016 | (Belgium) Thomas Vermaelen | (Spain) Barcelona | Roma | Loan |
| 9 August 2016 | (Ivory Coast) Cedric Gondo | Fiorentina | (Greece) Asteras Tripolis | Undisclosed |
| 9 August 2016 | (Brazil) Bruno Uvini | Napoli | (Saudi Arabia) Al-Nassr | Undisclosed |
| 9 August 2016 | (France) Paul Pogba | Juventus | (England) Manchester United | €105M |
| 9 August 2016 | (Portugal) João Silva | Udinese | Virtus Entella | Loan |
| 9 August 2016 | (Sweden) Samuel Gustafson | (Sweden) BK Häcken | Torino | Undisclosed |
| 9 August 2016 | Federico Zenuni | Torino | Tuttocuoio | Loan |
| 9 August 2016 | (Colombia) Carlos Sánchez | (England) Aston Villa | Fiorentina | Loan |
| 9 August 2016 | (Nigeria) Jerry Mbakogu | Carpi | (Russia) Krylia Sovetov | Loan |
| 9 August 2016 | Cristian Pasquato | Juventus | (Russia) Krylia Sovetov | Loan |
| 9 August 2016 | Paolo Rozzio | Pisa | Reggiana | Undisclosed |
| 9 August 2016 | (Republic of the Congo) Granddi Ngoyi | Palermo | Unattached | Released |
| 10 August 2016 | (Argentina) Gaspar Iñíguez | Udinese | (Argentina) Tigre | Loan |
| 10 August 2016 | (Chile) Mauricio Isla | Juventus | Cagliari | €4M |
| 10 August 2016 | Filippo Florio | Ischia | Ascoli | Free |
| 10 August 2016 | Filippo Florio | Ascoli | Lucchese | Loan |
| 10 August 2016 | Jacopo Dezi | Napoli | Perugia | Loan |
| 10 August 2016 | (Greece) Michalis Iliadis | (Greece) Olympiacos | Salernitana | Free |
| 10 August 2016 | Francesco Cassata | Juventus | Ascoli | Loan |
| 10 August 2016 | Giampiero Pinzi | Chievo | Brescia | Free |
| 10 August 2016 | Danilo Bulevardi | Pescara | Teramo | Free |
| 10 August 2016 | Andrea Tripicchio | Crotone | Reggina | Loan |
| 10 August 2016 | (Morocco) Abdelhamid El Kaoutari | Palermo | (France) Bastia | Loan |
| 10 August 2016 | Simone Edera | Torino | Venezia | Loan |
| 10 August 2016 | Gianluca Di Chiara | Catanzaro | Perugia | Loan |
| 10 August 2016 | Jacopo Dezi | Napoli | Perugia | Loan |
| 10 August 2016 | Alessandro Marotta | Benevento | Siena | Undisclosed |
| 11 August 2016 | Antonio Caracciolo | Brescia | Verona | Undisclosed |
| 11 August 2016 | Alberto Almici | Atalanta | Ascoli | Loan |
| 11 August 2016 | Francesco Tavano | Avellino | Prato | Free |
| 11 August 2016 | Vittorio Parigini | Torino | Chievo | Loan |
| 11 August 2016 | Francesco Vicari | Novara | S.P.A.L. | Undisclosed |
| 11 August 2016 | (Argentina) Emanuel Insúa | Udinese | (Argentina) Racing Club | Loan |
| 11 August 2016 | (Slovakia) Norbert Gyömbér | Roma | Pescara | Loan |
| 11 August 2016 | Nicolò Corticchia | Vicenza | Unattached | Released |
| 11 August 2016 | Piergiuseppe Maritato | Vicenza | Unattached | Released |
| 12 August 2016 | (Germany) Moritz Leitner | (Germany) Borussia Dortmund | Lazio | Undisclosed |
| 12 August 2016 | Daniel Bessa | Inter | Verona | Loan |
| 12 August 2016 | (The Gambia) Ali Sowe | Chievo | Prato | Loan |
| 12 August 2016 | Michele Canini | Atalanta | Parma | Loan |
| 12 August 2016 | (Albania) Migjen Basha | (Switzerland) Luzern | Bari | Undisclosed |
| 13 August 2016 | Fabio Gavazzi | Novara | AlbinoLeffe | Undisclosed |
| 14 August 2016 | Andrea Bianchimano | Milan | Reggina | Loan |
| 14 August 2016 | Alessandro Bellemo | S.P.A.L. | Fano | Loan |
| 14 August 2016 | (France) Prince-Désir Gouano | Atalanta | (Portugal) Vitória Guimarães | Loan |
| 15 August 2016 | (Slovenia) Dejan Lazarević | Chievo | (Turkey) Karabükspor | Loan |
| 15 August 2016 | (Kazakhstan) Alexander Merkel | Pisa | Bochum | Undisclosed |
| 16 August 2016 | (Spain) Cristian Tello | (Spain) Barcelona | Fiorentina | Loan |
| 16 August 2016 | (Brazil) Bruno Peres | Torino | Roma | Loan |
| 16 August 2016 | Luca Rossettini | Bologna | Torino | Undisclosed |
| 16 August 2016 | (Portugal) Bruno Fernandes | Udinese | Sampdoria | Loan |
| 16 August 2016 | Alessandro Matri | Milan | Sassuolo | Undisclosed |
| 16 August 2016 | Marco Moscati | Livorno | Virtus Entella | Loan |
| 16 August 2016 | (Croatia) Hrvoje Milić | (Croatia) Hajduk Split | Fiorentina | Undisclosed |
| 16 August 2016 | (Spain) Rubén Palomeque | Bologna | Lupa Roma | Loan |
| 17 August 2016 | Andrea Feola | Trapani | Olbia | Undisclosed |
| 17 August 2016 | Salvatore Aloi | Trapani | Lupa Roma | Loan |
| 17 August 2016 | (Argentina) José Sosa | (Turkey) Beşiktaş | Milan | Undisclosed |
| 17 August 2016 | (Albania) Frédéric Veseli | (Switzerland) Lugano | Empoli | Free |
| 17 August 2016 | Pasquale Schiattarella | Latina | S.P.A.L. | Free |
| 17 August 2016 | (Angola) Bastos | (Russia) Rostov | Lazio | Undisclosed |
| 17 August 2016 | (Switzerland) Blerim Džemaili | (Turkey) Galatasaray | Bologna | Undisclosed |
| 17 August 2016 | Giuseppe Fornito | Trapani | Catania | Loan |
| 17 August 2016 | Christian D'Urso | Roma | Latina | Loan |
| 17 August 2016 | Filippo Capitanio | Cesena | Teramo | Loan |
| 18 August 2016 | Lorenzo De Silvestri | Sampdoria | Torino | Undisclosed |
| 18 August 2016 | (Brazil) Leandro Castán | Roma | Torino | Loan |
| 18 August 2016 | (Argentina) Giovanni Simeone | (Argentina) River Plate | Genoa | Undisclosed |
| 18 August 2016 | (Sweden) Pontus Jansson | Torino | (England) Leeds | Loan |
| 18 August 2016 | (Uruguay) Gastón Silva | Torino | (Spain) Granada | Loan |
| 18 August 2016 | Alessandro Rosina | Catania | Salernitana | Free |
| 18 August 2016 | (Germany) Mario Gómez | Fiorentina | (Germany) Wolfsburg | Undisclosed |
| 18 August 2016 | Lorenzo Bardini | Fiorentina | Cesena | Undisclosed |
| 18 August 2016 | Antonio Mazzotta | Pescara | Frosinone | Loan |
| 18 August 2016 | (France) Sebastian De Maio | (Belgium) Anderlecht | Fiorentina | Loan |
| 18 August 2016 | (Uruguay) Rodrigo Aguirre | Udinese | (Switzerland) Lugano | Loan |
| 18 August 2016 | (Brazil) Dodô | Inter | Sampdoria | 2-year loan |
| 18 August 2016 | (Bosnia and Herzegovina) Marko Đurić | Cesena | Ancona | Loan |
| 19 August 2016 | (Slovenia) Armin Bačinović | Virtus Lanciano | Ternana | Free |
| 19 August 2016 | Riccardo Improta | Genoa | Salernitana | Loan |
| 19 August 2016 | Fabio Della Giovanna | Inter | Ternana | Loan |
| 19 August 2016 | Raffaele Di Gennaro | Inter | Ternana | Loan |
| 19 August 2016 | (Democratic Republic of the Congo) Luzayadio Bangu | Fiorentina | Reggina | Loan |
| 19 August 2016 | Manél Minicucci | Bari | Fidelis Andria | Undisclosed |
| 19 August 2016 | (France) Abdoulay Konko | Lazio | Atalanta | Free |
| 19 August 2016 | Ferdinando Mastroianni | Carpi | Albinoleffe | Loan |
| 19 August 2016 | Alberto Picchi | Empoli | S.P.A.L. | Loan |
| 19 August 2016 | (Switzerland) Cephas Malele | Palermo | (Portugal) Leixões | Loan |
| 19 August 2016 | (Lithuania) Tomas Švedkauskas | Roma | Lupa Roma | Loan |
| 19 August 2016 | Nikita Contini | Napoli | Carrarese | Loan |
| 20 August 2016 | (Argentina) Roberto Pereyra | Juventus | (England) Watford | €13M |
| 21 August 2016 | (Mexico) Carlos Salcedo | (Mexico) Guadalajara | Fiorentina | Loan |
| 22 August 2016 | (Croatia) Josip Maganjić | (Croatia) Hajduk | Fiorentina | Undisclosed |
| 22 August 2016 | Alessio Sestu | Chievo | Alessandria | 2-year loan |
| 22 August 2016 | (Croatia) Robert Murić | (Netherlands) Ajax | Pescara | Loan |
| 22 August 2016 | (France) Jean-Christophe Bahebeck | (France) PSG | Pescara | Loan |
| 22 August 2016 | (Serbia) Uroš Đurđević | Palermo | (Serbia) Partizan | Free |
| 23 August 2016 | Aleandro Rosi | Genoa | Crotone | Loan |
| 23 August 2016 | Nicholas Bensaja | Pescara | Catanzaro | Loan |
| 23 August 2016 | (Romania) Constantin Nica | Atalanta | Latina | 2-year loan |
| 23 August 2016 | Federico Furlan | Ternana | Bari | Undisclosed |
| 23 August 2016 | (Brazil) Matheus Cassini | Palermo | Siracusa | Loan |
| 23 August 2016 | Marco Toscano | Palermo | Siracusa | Loan |
| 23 August 2016 | Ivan De Santis | Milan | Catania | Loan |
| 24 August 2016 | (Croatia) Ricardo Bagadur | Fiorentina | Benevento | Loan |
| 24 August 2016 | Marino Defendi | Bari | Ternana | Undisclosed |
| 24 August 2016 | Cristian Bunino | Juventus | Siena | Loan |
| 24 August 2016 | (Belgium) Dennis Praet | (Belgium) Anderlecht | Sampdoria | Undisclosed |
| 24 August 2016 | (North Macedonia) Nikola Jakimovski | Bari | Benevento | Undisclosed |
| 24 August 2016 | Stefano Amadio | Teramo | Latina | Undisclosed |
| 24 August 2016 | Giacomo Beretta | Milan | Virtus Entella | Loan |
| 24 August 2016 | (Portugal) João Pedro | Avellino | Salernitana | Free |
| 24 August 2016 | (Serbia) Milan Biševac | Lazio | (France) Metz | Free |
| 25 August 2016 | Stefano Pettinari | Roma | Pescara | Undisclosed |
| 25 August 2016 | Simone Pepe | Chievo | Pescara | Free |
| 25 August 2016 | (Belgium) Samuel Bastien | (Belgium) Anderlecht | Chievo | Undisclosed |
| 25 August 2016 | Davide Lanzafame | Novara | (Hungary) Honvéd | Undisclosed |
| 25 August 2016 | (Slovakia) Richard Lásik | (Slovakia) Slovan Bratislava | Avellino | Undisclosed |
| 25 August 2016 | Giovanni Di Noia | Bari | Ternana | Loan |
| 25 August 2016 | (Brazil) Victor da Silva | Chievo | Perugia | Loan |
| 25 August 2016 | Luca Zanon | Fiorentina | Pistoiese | Loan |
| 25 August 2016 | (Slovakia) Dávid Ivan | Sampdoria | Bari | Loan |
| 25 August 2016 | (Belgium) Noë Dussenne | (Belgium) Royal Excel Mouscron | Crotone | Undisclosed |
| 25 August 2016 | Alessandro De Leidi | Cittadella | Como | Undisclosed |
| 26 August 2016 | Adriano Montalto | Trapani | Juve Stabia | Undisclosed |
| 25 August 2016 | Alessandro Piacenti | Perugia | Ternana | Free |
| 25 August 2016 | Nicola Pozzi | Vicenza | Unattached | Released |
| 25 August 2016 | Thomas Manfredini | Vicenza | Unattached | Released |
| 25 August 2016 | (Lithuania) Vykintas Slivka | Juventus | (Netherlands) Den Bosch | Loan |
| 26 August 2016 | (Netherlands) Jonathan de Guzmán | Napoli | Chievo | Loan |
| 26 August 2016 | Sebastiano Luperto | Napoli | Pro Vercelli | Loan |
| 26 August 2016 | (Guinea) Amadou Diawara | Bologna | Napoli | Undisclosed |
| 26 August 2016 | (Spain) David López | Napoli | (Spain) Espanyol | Undisclosed |
| 26 August 2016 | Guido Marilungo | Atalanta | Empoli | Loan |
| 26 August 2016 | Alberto Aquilani | (Portugal) Sporting Lisbon | Pescara | Free |
| 26 August 2016 | (Netherlands) Ouasim Bouy | Juventus | Palermo | Loan |
| 26 August 2016 | Luca Crecco | Lazio | Avellino | Loan |
| 26 August 2016 | (Spain) Juande | Spezia | (Spain) UCAM Murcia | Loan |
| 26 August 2016 | Pietro Visconti | Avellino | Trapani | Undisclosed |
| 26 August 2016 | Mel Taufer | Inter | Trapani | Loan |
| 26 August 2016 | (Nigeria) Theophilus Awua | Spezia | Inter | Loan |
| 26 August 2016 | Antonino Ragusa | Cesena | Sassuolo | Undisclosed |
| 26 August 2016 | Luca Germoni | Lazio | Ternana | Loan |
| 26 August 2016 | Lorenzo Ariaudo | Sassuolo | Frosinone | Undisclosed |
| 27 August 2016 | Matteo Contini | Atalanta | Ternana | Loan |
| 27 August 2016 | (Croatia) Mario Pašalić | (England) Chelsea | Milan | Loan |
| 27 August 2016 | (Croatia) Marko Rog | (Croatia) Dinamo Zagreb | Napoli | Undisclosed |
| 27 August 2016 | (Portugal) João Mário | (Portugal) Sporting Lisbon | Inter | €45M |
| 27 August 2016 | (Uruguay) Sebastián Cristóforo | (Spain) Sevilla | Fiorentina | Loan |
| 27 August 2016 | Karim Laribi | Sassuolo | Cesena | Loan |
| 27 August 2016 | (Switzerland) Jonathan Rossini | Sassuolo | Livorno | Loan |
| 27 August 2016 | (Poland) Adam Chrzanowski | (Poland) Lechia Gdańsk | Fiorentina | Loan |
| 27 August 2016 | Giuseppe Rossi | Fiorentina | (Spain) Celta | Loan |
| 27 August 2016 | (Greece) Lazaros Christodoulopoulos | Verona | (Greece) AEK Athens | Loan |
| 28 August 2016 | Simone Zaza | Juventus | (England) West Ham | Loan |
| 28 August 2016 | (Morocco) Achraf Lazaar | Palermo | (England) Newcastle | Undisclosed |
| 28 August 2016 | (Portugal) Pedro Delgado | Inter | (Portugal) Sporting Lisbon | Undisclosed |
| 29 August 2016 | (Uruguay) Jaime Báez | Fiorentina | Spezia | Loan |
| 29 August 2016 | Simon Laner | Verona | Modena | Loan |
| 29 August 2016 | Filippo Romagna | Juventus | Novara | Loan |
| 29 August 2016 | Andrea Rossi | Pescara | Brescia | Loan |
| 29 August 2016 | (Brazil) Bruno Henrique | (Brazil) Corinthians | Palermo | Undisclosed |
| 29 August 2016 | (Croatia) Marko Pajač | Cagliari | Benevento | Loan |
| 29 August 2016 | (Cameroon) Steve Leo Beleck | Fiorentina | (Turkey) Ümraniyespor | Loan |
| 29 August 2016 | Alessandro Diamanti | (China) Guangzhou Evergrande | Palermo | Free |
| 29 August 2016 | Leonardo Capezzi | Crotone | Sampdoria | Undisclosed |
| 29 August 2016 | Leonardo Capezzi | Sampdoria | Crotone | Loan |
| 29 August 2016 | (Croatia) Niko Datković | (Croatia) HNK Rijeka | Spezia | Undisclosed |
| 29 August 2016 | (Nigeria) Stanley Amuzie | (Portugal) Olhanense | Sampdoria | Undisclosed |
| 29 August 2016 | (Belgium) Sven Kums | (Belgium) Gent | Udinese | Loan |
| 29 August 2016 | (Brazil) Maurício | Lazio | (Turkey) Spartak Moscow | Loan |
| 30 August 2016 | Ernesto Torregrossa | Verona | Brescia | Loan |
| 30 August 2016 | Franco Brienza | Bologna | Bari | Undisclosed |
| 30 August 2016 | Nicola Lancini | Brescia | Bassano | Loan |
| 30 August 2016 | (Tunisia) Hamdi Harbaoui | Udinese | (Belgium) Anderlecht | Undisclosed |
| 30 August 2016 | (Brazil) Gabriel Barbosa | (Brazil) Santos | Inter | Undisclosed |
| 30 August 2016 | (Turkey) Caner Erkin | Inter | (Turkey) Beşiktaş | Undisclosed |
| 30 August 2016 | (Switzerland) Matteo Fedele | Carpi | Bari | Loan |
| 30 August 2016 | José Mauri | Milan | Empoli | Loan |
| 30 August 2016 | Lorenzo Di Livio | Roma | Ternana | Loan |
| 30 August 2016 | (Spain) Carlos Blanco | Juventus | (Switzerland) Lausanne | Loan |
| 30 August 2016 | (Switzerland) Andi Zeqiri | (Switzerland) Lausanne | Juventus | Loan |
| 30 August 2016 | (Serbia) Boško Janković | Verona | Unattached | Released |
| 30 August 2016 | (Romania) Deian Boldor | Bologna | Verona | Loan |
| 30 August 2016 | (Croatia) Frane Bitunjac | Fiorentina | (Croatia) HNK Šibenik | Loan |
| 30 August 2016 | Andrea Scicchitano | Crotone | Lupa Roma | Loan |
| 30 August 2016 | Alberto Grassi | Napoli | Atalanta | Loan |
| 30 August 2016 | Simone Minelli | Fiorentina | AlbinoLeffe | Loan |
| 30 August 2016 | (Norway) Morten Knudsen | Inter | Reggina | Loan |
| 30 August 2016 | Davide Monteleone | Palermo | Padova | Loan |
| 30 August 2016 | (Romania) Ionuț Rada | Bari | Fidelis Andria | Undisclosed |
| 30 August 2016 | Luca Marrone | Juventus | (Belgium) Zulte Waregem | Loan |
| 30 August 2016 | (Sweden) Joakim Olausson | Perugia | Unattached | Released |
| 31 August 2016 | Salvatore Molina | Atalanta | Avellino | Loan |
| 31 August 2016 | (Albania) Berat Djimsiti | Atalanta | Avellino | Loan |
| 31 August 2016 | (Brazil) Gilberto | Fiorentina | Latina | Loan |
| 31 August 2016 | Simone Aresti | Pescara | Ternana | Undisclosed |
| 31 August 2016 | (England) Joe Hart | (England) Manchester City | Torino | Loan |
| 31 August 2016 | (Morocco) Ismail H'Maidat | Roma | Vicenza | Loan |
| 31 August 2016 | (Colombia) Carlos Carbonero | (Uruguay) Fénix | Sampdoria | Loan |
| 31 August 2016 | Davide Biraschi | Avellino | Genoa | Loan |
| 31 August 2016 | (Uruguay) Salvador Ichazo | Torino | Bari | Loan |
| 31 August 2016 | (Venezuela) Franco Signorelli | Empoli | Spezia | Undisclosed |
| 31 August 2016 | Alessio Lo Porto | Ternana | Tuttocuoio | Undisclosed |
| 31 August 2016 | Nicolao Dumitru | Napoli | (England) Nottingham Forest | Loan |
| 31 August 2016 | (Colombia) Juan Cuadrado | (England) Chelsea | Juventus | 3-year loan |
| 31 August 2016 | (Croatia) Igor Bubnjić | Udinese | Brescia | Loan |
| 31 August 2016 | Giovanni Sbrissa | Sassuolo | Brescia | Loan |
| 31 August 2016 | Leonardo Fontanesi | Sassuolo | Brescia | Loan |
| 31 August 2016 | Matteo Ardemagni | Atalanta | Avellino | Undisclosed |
| 31 August 2016 | (Slovenia) Aljaž Struna | Palermo | Carpi | Loan |
| 31 August 2016 | Luca Mazzoni | Ternana | Livorno | Undisclosed |
| 31 August 2016 | (Spain) Marcos Alonso | Fiorentina | (England) Chelsea | Undisclosed |
| 31 August 2016 | Gennaro Acampora | Spezia | Perugia | Loan |
| 31 August 2016 | Loris Bacchetti | Pro Vercelli | Monopoli | Loan |
| 31 August 2016 | Davide Brivio | Atalanta | Genoa | Undisclosed |
| 31 August 2016 | Riccardo Secondo | Pro Vercelli | Siena | Loan |
| 31 August 2016 | (Uruguay) Pablo Granoche | Modena | Spezia | Free |
| 31 August 2016 | Simone Emmanuello | Atalanta | Pro Vercelli | Loan |
| 31 August 2016 | (Switzerland) Joel Untersee | Juventus | Brescia | Loan |
| 31 August 2016 | (Austria) Renny Smith | (England) Burnley | Vicenza | Loan |
| 31 August 2016 | Luca Checchin | Verona | Prato | Loan |
| 31 August 2016 | Alfred Gomis | Torino | Bologna | Loan |
| 31 August 2016 | Antonio Palumbo | Ternana | Sampdoria | Undisclosed |
| 31 August 2016 | Antonio Palumbo | Sampdoria | Ternana | Loan |
| 31 August 2016 | (Argentina) Santiago Colombatto | Cagliari | Trapani | Loan |
| 31 August 2016 | (Slovenia) Gregor Bajde | (Slovenia) Maribor | Novara | Loan |
| 31 August 2016 | Stefano Moreo | Virtus Entella | Venezia | Loan |
| 31 August 2016 | Christian Silenzi | Inter | Reggina | Undisclosed |
| 31 August 2016 | Vincenzo Tommasone | Inter | Reggina | Loan |
| 31 August 2016 | Andrea Romanò | Inter | Reggina | Loan |
| 31 August 2016 | Luca Ceccarelli | Bologna | Unattached | Released |
| 31 August 2016 | Federico Viviani | Verona | Bologna | Loan |
| 31 August 2016 | Gennaro Troianiello | Salernitana | Verona | Undisclosed |
| 31 August 2016 | Cristian Zaccardo | Carpi | Vicenza | Loan |
| 31 August 2016 | (Serbia) Nikola Maksimović | Torino | Napoli | Loan |
| 31 August 2016 | Alessandro Deiola | Cagliari | Spezia | Loan |
| 31 August 2016 | (Slovenia) Damir Bartulovič | Chievo | Como | Loan |
| 31 August 2016 | Filippo Damian | Chievo | Como | Loan |
| 31 August 2016 | (The Gambia) Yusupha Bobb | Chievo | Taranto | Loan |
| 31 August 2016 | (Colombia) Jherson Vergara | Milan | (Russia) Arsenal Tula | Loan |
| 31 August 2016 | Federico Ricci | Roma | Sassuolo | Loan |
| 31 August 2016 | Pietro Cianci | Fidelis Andria | Sassuolo | Undisclosed |
| 31 August 2016 | Pietro Cianci | Sassuolo | Fidelis Andria | Loan |
| 31 August 2016 | (Nigeria) Umar Sadiq | Roma | Bologna | Loan |
| 31 August 2016 | Gian Marco Ferrari | Crotone | Sassuolo | Undisclosed |
| 31 August 2016 | Gian Marco Ferrari | Sassuolo | Crotone | Loan |
| 31 August 2016 | Pietro Iemmello | Spezia | Sassuolo | Undisclosed |
| 31 August 2016 | (Ghana) Amidu Salifu | Fiorentina | Mantova | Loan |
| 31 August 2016 | Mauro Coppolaro | Udinese | Latina | Loan |
| 31 August 2016 | (Gabon) Yrondu Musavu-King | Udinese | (France) Toulouse | Loan |
| 31 August 2016 | (Ghana) Ransford Selasi | Pescara | Novara | Loan |
| 31 August 2016 | Luca Bittante | Empoli | Cagliari | Loan |
| 31 August 2016 | (Algeria) Najib Ammari | Latina | Virtus Entella | Undisclosed |
| 31 August 2016 | (Republic of the Congo) Paul-José M'Poku | Chievo | (Greece) Panathinaikos | Loan |
| 31 August 2016 | Cristiano Del Grosso | Atalanta | S.P.A.L. | Loan |
| 31 August 2016 | Giuseppe Figliomeni | Latina | Trapani | Free |
| 31 August 2016 | (Spain) Diego López | Milan | (Spain) Espanyol | Loan |
| 31 August 2016 | (Spain) Luis Alberto | Liverpool | Lazio | Undisclosed |
| 31 August 2016 | (Slovenia) Luka Krajnc | Cagliari | Sampdoria | Loan |
| 31 August 2016 | Lorenzo Crisetig | Inter | Bologna | Undisclosed |
| 31 August 2016 | Lorenzo Crisetig | Bologna | Crotone | Loan |
| 31 August 2016 | Daniele Buzzegoli | Novara | Benevento | Undisclosed |
| 31 August 2016 | Mirko Valdifiori | Napoli | Torino | Undisclosed |
| 31 August 2016 | (France) William Vainqueur | Roma | (France) Olympique de Marseille | Loan |
| 31 August 2016 | (Argentina) Lucas Orbán | (Spain) Valencia | Genoa | Undisclosed |
| 31 August 2016 | Francesco Renzetti | Genoa | Cesena | Loan |
| 31 August 2016 | (Serbia) Aleksandar Pešić | (France) Toulouse | Atalanta | Loan |
| 31 August 2016 | (Romania) Valentin Cojocaru | (Romania) Steaua București | Crotone | Loan |
| 31 August 2016 | (Slovenia) Žan Benedičič | Ascoli | Unattached | Released |
| 31 August 2016 | (Croatia) Josip Radošević | Napoli | (Austria) Red Bull Salzburg | Free |
| 31 August 2016 | (Senegal) Mame Baba Thiam | Juventus | (Greece) PAOK | Loan |
| 31 August 2016 | (Brazil) Jefferson | Latina | Teramo | Undisclosed |
| 31 August 2016 | (Sweden) Filip Helander | Verona | Bologna | Loan |
| 31 August 2016 | Diego Falcinelli | Sassuolo | Crotone | Loan |
| 31 August 2016 | Marcello Trotta | Sassuolo | Crotone | Loan |
| 31 August 2016 | Nicolò Cherubin | Bologna | Verona | Loan |
| 31 August 2016 | (Turkey) Rayyan Baniya | Modena | Verona | Undisclosed |
| 31 August 2016 | Alessandro Sbaffo | Avellino | Reggiana | Loan |
| 31 August 2016 | Francesco Nicastro | Pescara | Perugia | Loan |
| 31 August 2016 | Andrea Esposito | Latina | Vicenza | Undisclosed |
| 31 August 2016 | Marco Pinato | Vicenza | Latina | Undisclosed |
| 31 August 2016 | Elio Capradossi | Roma | Bari | Loan |
| 31 August 2016 | (Greece) Panagiotis Tachtsidis | Torino | Cagliari | Loan |
| 31 August 2016 | Simone Bastoni | Spezia | Carrarese | Loan |
| 31 August 2016 | (Albania) Kastriot Dermaku | Empoli | Lucchese | Loan |
| 31 August 2016 | Enrico Zampa | Ternana | Ancona | Undisclosed |
| 31 August 2016 | Andrea Favilli | Livorno | Ascoli | Loan |
| 31 August 2016 | (Slovenia) Enis Nadarević | Trapani | Unattached | Released |
| 31 August 2016 | (Algeria) Djamel Mesbah | Sampdoria | Unattached | Released |
| 31 August 2016 | Angelo Rea | Avellino | Messina | Undisclosed |
| 31 August 2016 | (Brazil) Edenílson | Udinese | Genoa | Loan |
| 31 August 2016 | (Greece) Vasilis Torosidis | Roma | Bologna | Undisclosed |
| 31 August 2016 | (Albania) Etrit Berisha | Lazio | Atalanta | Loan |
| 31 August 2016 | Antonio Rozzi | Lazio | Lupa Roma | Loan |
| 31 August 2016 | (Australia) Chris Ikonomidis | Lazio | (Denmark) AGF | Loan |
| 31 August 2016 | (Colombia) Brayan Perea | Lazio | (Spain) Lugo | Loan |
| 31 August 2016 | (Brazil) Ronaldo Pompeu | Lazio | Salernitana | Loan |
| 31 August 2016 | Lorenzo Montipò | Novara | Carpi | Loan |
| 31 August 2016 | (Chile) Matías Fernández | Fiorentina | Milan | Loan |
| 31 August 2016 | Francesco Della Rocca | Perugia | Salernitana | Undisclosed |
| 31 August 2016 | Davide Moro | Salernitana | Cremonese | Undisclosed |
| 31 August 2016 | (Poland) Paweł Wszołek | Verona | (England) QPR | Loan |
| 31 August 2016 | Nunzio Di Roberto | Crotone | Cesena | Loan |
| 31 August 2016 | Gabriele Perico | Unattached | Salernitana | Free |
| 1 September 2016 | (Algeria) Djamel Mesbah | Unattached | Crotone | Free |
| 5 September 2016 | Enzo Maresca | Unattached | Verona | Free |
| 5 September 2016 | (Croatia) Tomislav Gomelt | Bari | (Romania) CFR Cluj | Loan |
