= Davide Balestrero =

Italian footballer (born 1995)

Personal information
- Date of birth: 6 October 1995 (age 31)
- Place of birth: Genoa, Italy
- Height: 1.87 m (6 ft 2 in)
- Position: Midfielder

Team information
- Current team: Union Brescia
- Number: 8

Youth career
- Lavagnese

Senior career*
| Years | Team | Apps | (Gls) |
| 2013–2014 | Sestri Levante | 19 | (7) |
| 2014–2015 | Novese | 35 | (8) |
| 2015–2016 | Lavagnese | 35 | (6) |
| 2016–2017 | Monopoli | 28 | (0) |
| 2017 | Vibonese | 2 | (0) |
| 2017–2018 | Savona | 17 | (7) |
| 2018–2019 | Albissola | 33 | (1) |
| 2019–2020 | Arzignano | 24 | (2) |
| 2020–2021 | Matelica | 36 | (6) |
| 2021–2025 | Feralpisalò | 128 | (21) |
| 2025– | Union Brescia | 36 | (4) |
- * Club domestic league appearances and goals as of 29 April 2026

Davide Balestrero (born 6 October 1995) is an Italian footballer who plays as a midfielder for Serie C Group A side Union Brescia.

== Club career ==
Balestrero started his career in Lavagnese, he signed to Serie D side Sestri Levante in December 2013. He started the 2014–15 season at Novese, to 2015–16 he returned to the Lavagnese. On the summer of 2016, he signed to Lega Pro side Monopoli. He made his debut at the third tier of Italian football on 4 September 2016, in the 2nd round against Casertana, playing 90 minutes. He left Monopoli on the summer of 2017 to fourth-tier Vibonese, but he played 42 minutes in 2 match. In winter, he left for Savona. On the summer of 2018, he returned to Serie C as Albissola signed him.

On 6 July 2019, he joined Arzignano.

On 24 August 2020 he signed with Matelica, freshly promoted into Serie C.

On 29 June 2021, he moved to Feralpisalò.

== Sources ==
- Davide Balestrero at TuttoCalciatori.net (in Italian)
- Davide Balestrero at Soccerway
