= Andrea Gulli =

Italian footballer (born 1997)

Personal information
- Date of birth: 9 November 1997 (age 29)
- Place of birth: Savona, Italy
- Height: 1.79 m (5 ft 10 in)
- Position: Defender

Team information
- Current team: Derthona

Youth career
- Genoa

Senior career*
Years	Team	Apps	(Gls)
2016–2018	Genoa	0	(0)
2016–2017	→ Santarcangelo (loan)	13	(0)
2017–2018	→ Albissola (loan)	29	(4)
2018–2019	Albissola	11	(0)
2019–2020	Ligorna	19	(3)
2020–2021	Vado	24	(0)
2021–2022	PDHAE	37	(5)
2022–2023	Ligorna	26	(5)
2023–	Derthona	9	(1)
- * Club domestic league appearances and goals as of 20 December 2023

Andrea Gulli (born 9 November 1997) is an Italian footballer who plays as a defender for Serie D club Derthona.

== Club career ==
Gulli started his career in Genoa. In the summer of 2016, he was loaned to Lega Pro side Santarcangelo. He made his professional debut in the first round of the 2016–17 season, coming on as a substitute in the 83rd minute for Francesco Posocco in the 3–1 home won against Feralpisalò. He played only 13 matches, then Genoa loaned him Serie D side Albissola to the 2017–18 season in the summer of 2017. The team was promoted to Serie C, and made Gulli's signing permanent in the summer of 2018.

== Sources ==
- Andrea Gulli at TuttoCalciatori.net (in Italian)
- Andrea Gulli at Soccerway (archived)
