= Christian Silenzi =

Italian footballer (born 1997)

Personal information
- Date of birth: 24 May 1997 (age 29)
- Place of birth: Treviso, Italy
- Height: 1.90 m (6 ft 3 in)
- Position: Midfielder

Team information
- Current team: Real Calepina

Youth career
- Inter
- 2015–2016: → Reggiana (loan)

Senior career*
Years	Team	Apps	(Gls)
2016–2018	Reggina	7	(0)
2018	Olbia	14	(1)
2018–2019	Albissola	21	(0)
2019	Calcio Cittanovese	14	(4)
2019–2020	Chieri	9	(1)
2020–2021	Cittanova Calcio	32	(10)
2021–2022	Pro Vercelli	8	(1)
2022	Vis Pesaro	10	(0)
2022–2023	Seregno	26	(7)
2023	Sanremese	5	(0)
2023–	Real Calepina	0	(0)
- * Club domestic league appearances and goals as of 16 December 2023

Christian Silenzi (born 24 May 1997) is an Italian footballer who plays as a midfielder for Serie D club Real Calepina.

== Career ==
Silenzi started his career in Inter, he was loaned to Reggina to the 2015–16 season, before he was signed permanently on the summer of 2016 for an undisclosed fee. He made his professional debut on 25 January 2016, in the 19th round of 2015–16 season against Lumezzane, coming on as a substitute in the 89th minute for Nicholas Siega. On 31 January 2018, fellow Serie C team Olbia signed him, but he played 14 matches here. In November 2018, newly-promoted Albissola signed him.

On 4 September 2019, he joined Cittanovese.

On 4 September 2019, he signed for Cittanova Calcio.

On 28 August 2021, he joined Serie C club Pro Vercelli.

On 21 January 2022, he transferred to Vis Pesaro.

On 28 September 2022, Silenzi joined Seregno.

== Personal life ==
He is the son of former footballer Andrea Silenzi.

== Sources ==
- Christian Silenzi at TuttoCalciatori.net (in Italian)
