= João Silva =

João Silva or da Silva may refer to:

- João Silva (footballer, born 1926), Portuguese footballer
- João Silva (photographer) (born 1966), Portuguese journalist and photographer based in South Africa
- João Pedro Silva (triathlete) (born 1989), competitor in the ITU World Championship Series competitions
- João Silva (footballer, born 1990), Portuguese footballer
- João Luiz Ferreira da Silva (born 1981), Brazilian footballer known as Preto
- João Batista da Silva (born 1955), Brazilian football defender
- João Batista da Silva (athlete) (born 1963), Brazilian sprint athlete
- Jô (João Alves de Assis Silva, born 1987), Brazilian footballer
- Almeida Garrett (João Baptista da Silva Leitão de Almeida Garrett, 1799–1854), Portuguese poet, playwright, novelist and politician
- João Carlos Marinho Silva (born 1935), Brazilian writer
- João Domingos da Silva Pinto (born 1961), Portuguese footballer and manager
- João J. R. Fraústo da Silva (born 1933), Portuguese chemist
- João Marques da Silva Oliveira (1853–1927), Portuguese painter
- João da Silva (boxer) (born 1946), Brazilian Olympic boxer
- João Silva (footballer, born 1998), Portuguese footballer
- João Pedro Silva (handballer), Brazilian handballer
- Joao Silva (footballer, born 1997), Brazilian footballer
- João Silva (footballer, born 1999), Portuguese footballer
