= Gerevini =

Gerevini is an Italian surname. Notable people with the surname include:

- Gianmarco Gerevini (born 1993), Italian footballer
- Sveva Gerevini (born 1996), Italian heptathlete
