= Davide Ferrari =

Italian footballer (born 1992)

Personal information
- Date of birth: 20 February 1992 (age 34)
- Positions: Defender; midfielder

Youth career
- –2012: Brescia
- 2010–2011: → Rodengo–Saiano (loan)
- 2011: → Como (loan)

Senior career*
Years	Team	Apps	(Gls)
2012–2014	Brescia	0	(0)
2012–2013	→ San Marino (loan)	21	(0)
2013–2014	→ Viareggio (loan)	8	(0)
- * Club domestic league appearances and goals

Davide Ferrari (born 20 February 1992) is an Italian footballer who plays as a defender or midfielder. He appeared in the third tier of football in Italy for San Marino and Viareggio.

== Career ==
A youth product of Brescia Calcio, Ferrari was a player of the youth reserve team during the 2008–09 season. In 2010 Ferrari was signed by Rodengo–Saiano in co-ownership deal for a peppercorn fee of €250. Ferrari remained as a player for the reserve team. In January 2011 Brescia bought back Ferrari for a peppercorn of €500. He was signed by Calcio Como in another co-ownership deal ca 2011. On 31 August 2011, Ferrari was bought back by Brescia. Emanuele Bardelloni also moved to Como in co-ownership as part of the deal. Ferrari was a player for the reserve team of Brescia in 2011–12 season. In mid-2012 Ferrari was signed by San Marino Calcio in another co-ownership deal, for €500. On 21 June 2013 Brescia bought back Ferrari for €1,000. On 1 August 2013 Viareggio signed Ferrari, Nicola Falasco and Gianmarco Gerevini in temporary deals.
