= Emanuele Bardelloni =

Italian footballer (born 1990)

Personal information
- Date of birth: 15 May 1990 (age 36)
- Place of birth: Brescia, Italy
- Height: 1.82 m (6 ft 0 in)
- Position: Forward

Team information
- Current team: Legnano

Youth career
- –2010: Brescia
- 2009–2010: → Sampdoria (loan)

Senior career*
Years	Team	Apps	(Gls)
2010–2012	Como	43	(2)
2012–2013	Venezia	2	(0)
2013	Andria	1	(0)
2013–2014	Pergolettese	29	(7)
2014–2015	Real Vicenza	32	(6)
2015	Pergolettese	16	(3)
2016	Santarcangelo	14	(2)
2016–2017	Forlì	37	(8)
2017	Giana Erminio	13	(1)
2017–2018	Trento	29	(7)
2018–2020	Franciacorta	40	(17)
2020–2021	Crema	30	(14)
2021–2022	Virtus Bergamo	34	(18)
2022–2023	Desenzano	31	(7)
2023	Crema	17	(6)
2023–2024	Legnano	18	(3)
2024-	Castiglione	12	(8)

International career
2006	Italy U16	4	(0)
- * Club domestic league appearances and goals as of 20 November 2024

Emanuele Bardelloni (born 15 May 1990) is an Italian footballer who plays as a forward for Castiglione.

== Career ==
Born in Brescia, Lombardy, Bardelloni started his career at Brescia Calcio. In 2010 Bardelloni joined Como in temporary deal. On 31 August 2011 Como signed half of the registration rights of Bardelloni, with Davide Ferrari returned to Brescia outright. In June 2012 Brescia gave up the remain registration rights to Como. On 31 August 2012 Bardelloni joined Venezia in 1-year deal. On 30 January 2013 Bardelloni joined Andria, with Andrea Menegon moved to opposite direction.

In mid-2013 Bardelloni joined Lega Pro Seconda Divisione club Pergolettese. On 24 January 2014 his contract was extended to 30 June 2015.

In 2026, he joins the Kings League Italy with the Zebras. In 13 matches, he records 13 goals and 3 assists.
