= Gennaro Armeno =

Italian footballer (born 1994)

Personal information
- Date of birth: 12 February 1994 (age 32)
- Place of birth: Pozzuoli, Italy
- Height: 1.75 m (5 ft 9 in)
- Position: Left midfielder

Team information
- Current team: Scafatese
- Number: 15

Youth career
- Puteolana

Senior career*
Years	Team	Apps	(Gls)
2012–2016	Ischia	115	(6)
2016–2019	Novara	3	(0)
2017	→ Matera (loan)	11	(0)
2018	→ Reggina (loan)	16	(0)
2019	Teramo	10	(0)
2019–2020	Bisceglie	12	(0)
2020–2021	Puteolana	22	(0)
2021–2022	Frattese		
2022–2023	San Marzano		
2023–2024	Afragolese		
2024–	Scafatese	8	(0)
- * Club domestic league appearances and goals as of 17 November 2024

Gennaro Armeno (born 12 February 1994) is an Italian professional footballer who plays as a left midfielder for Serie D club Scafatese.

== Club career ==
He made his Serie C debut for Ischia on 31 August 2014 in a game against Benevento.

On 16 January 2019, he was released from his contract with Novara by mutual consent.

On 5 February 2019, he joined Teramo.

On 19 November 2019, he signed with Serie C club Bisceglie.
