= Marco Albertoni =

Italian football player

Personal information
- Date of birth: 5 August 1995 (age 31)
- Place of birth: Genoa, Italy
- Height: 1.88 m (6 ft 2 in)
- Position: Goalkeeper

Team information
- Current team: Celle Varazze
- Number: 95

Youth career
- –2014: Genoa

Senior career*
Years	Team	Apps	(Gls)
2014–2019	Genoa	0	(0)
2014–2015	→ SPAL (loan)	1	(0)
2015–2016	→ Mantova (loan)	0	(0)
2016–2017	→ Pistoiese (loan)	11	(0)
2017–2018	→ Lucchese (loan)	36	(0)
2018–2019	→ Albissola (loan)	20	(0)
2019–2020	Perugia	0	(0)
2020–2021	Ravenna	6	(0)
2021–2022	Renate	4	(0)
2023–2024	Catania	10	(0)
2024–2025	Perugia	3	(0)
2026–	Celle Varazze	7	(0)
- * Club domestic league appearances and goals as of 15 February 2026

Marco Albertoni (born 5 August 1995) is an Italian footballer who plays as a goalkeeper for Serie D club Celle Varazze.

== Club career ==
He made his Serie C debut for SPAL on 8 February 2015 in a game against Ascoli.

On 20 September 2019, he signed a 1-year deal with Perugia.

On 9 September 2021, he joined Serie C club Renate.

On 16 August 2024, Albertoni returned to Perugia on a one-year contract.
