= Andrea Menegon =

Italian footballer (born 1988)

Personal information
- Date of birth: 26 September 1988 (age 38)
- Place of birth: Tolmezzo, Italy
- Height: 1.95 m (6 ft 5 in)
- Position: Goalkeeper

Youth career
- Padova

Senior career*
Years	Team	Apps	(Gls)
2006–2011	Padova	0	(0)
2006–2008	→ Salò (loan)	45	(0)
2008–2009	→ Giacomense (loan)	14	(0)
2011	Pergocrema	5	(0)
2012	Andria	4	(0)
2013	Venezia	0	(0)
- * Club domestic league appearances and goals

Andrea Menegon (born 26 September 1988) is an Italian footballer who played as a goalkeeper in the third and fourth tiers of football in Italy.

== Career ==
Born in Tolmezzo, Friuli, Menegon started his career at Veneto club Calcio Padova. Menegon received call-up to Italy youth national team for 2005 European Youth Olympic Festival. He played once, as a substitute for Riccardo Delfino on 8 July, the final of the tournament. Italy lost 0–2 to Georgia, which Menegon conceded a goal from Janelidze. From 2006 to 2008 Menegon was a player for Salò in Serie D, top level of amateur league, or fifth level of the Italian football system (until 2014). On 10 July 2008 he was signed by the fourth division club Giacomense in co-ownership deal. In June 2009 Menegon returned to Padua. In mid-2011 Menegon joined Italian third division club Pergocrema. However, on 31 December 2011, Menegon was signed by fellow L.P. Prime Division club Andria.

Menegon did not play any game in 2012–13 season. On 30 January 2013 he was swapped with Emanuele Bardelloni of Venezia.
