= Aimone Calì =

Italian footballer (born 1997)

Personal information
- Date of birth: 11 February 1997 (age 29)
- Place of birth: Rome, Italy
- Height: 1.80 m (5 ft 11 in)
- Position: Forward

Team information
- Current team: Valmontone
- Number: 13

Youth career
- Romulea
- Nueva Tor Tre Teste
- –2015: Roma
- 2015–2016: Lazio

Senior career*
Years	Team	Apps	(Gls)
2016–2017	Carrarese	1	(0)
2017	Racing Roma	2	(0)
2017–2018	Audace	30	(28)
2018–2019	Montespaccato	29	(28)
2019–2020	Atalanta	0	(0)
2019–2020	→ Catanzaro (loan)	4	(0)
2020	Viterbese	8	(0)
2021–2023	Montespaccato	81	(24)
2023–2024	Romana	33	(18)
2024–2025	Guidonia	41	(18)
2025–	Valmontone	2	(0)
- * Club domestic league appearances and goals as of 4 January 2026

Aimone Calì (born 11 February 1997) is an Italian football player who plays for Serie D club Valmontone.

== Club career ==
In his youth career he represented Roma and Lazio.

He made his professional Serie C debut for Carrarese on 18 September 2016 in a game against Cremonese.

From 2017 to 2019 he played in the fifth-tier Eccellenza league.

In July 2019 he was signed by Serie A club Atalanta, who then on 13 July 2019 loaned him to Catanzaro in Serie C for a two-year term with a purchase option.

On 8 August 2020 he signed a 3-year contract with Viterbese. The contract was terminated by mutual consent on 30 December 2020. He then returned to one of his previous club Montespaccato, which was promoted into Serie D.
