= Filippo Florio =

Italian footballer

Personal information
- Date of birth: 23 April 1996 (age 30)
- Place of birth: Naples, Italy
- Height: 1.80 m (5 ft 11 in)
- Position: Defender

Team information
- Current team: Ischia
- Number: 11

Youth career
- –2014: Ischia
- 2014: → Torino (loan)

Senior career*
| Years | Team | Apps | (Gls) |
| 2011–2013 | Ischia | 4 | (0) |
| 2014–2016 | Ischia | 35 | (3) |
| 2015 | → Rimini (loan) | 13 | (1) |
| 2016–2018 | Ascoli | 4 | (0) |
| 2016–2017 | → Lucchese (loan) | 13 | (0) |
| 2017 | → Santarcangelo (loan) | 14 | (0) |
| 2018–2019 | Pordenone | 15 | (0) |
| 2019–2020 | Teramo | 13 | (0) |
| 2020– | Ischia | 5 | (0) |
- * Club domestic league appearances and goals as of 8 October 2023

Filippo Florio (born 23 April 1996) is an Italian football player who plays for Serie D club Ischia.

== Club career ==
He made his Serie C debut for Ischia on 6 September 2015 in a game against Lupa Castella Romani.

On 2 September 2019, he signed with Teramo.
