= Roberto Criscuolo =

Italian football player

Personal information
- Date of birth: 21 February 1997 (age 29)
- Place of birth: Palestrina, Italy
- Height: 1.78 m (5 ft 10 in)
- Position: Midfielder

Team information
- Current team: Audace 1919

Youth career
- –2014: Lazio
- 2014: Latina

Senior career*
Years	Team	Apps	(Gls)
2015–2016	Latina	0	(0)
2016–	Sampdoria	0	(0)
2016–2017	→ Latina (loan)	1	(0)
2017–2018	→ Arezzo (loan)	1	(0)
2018–2019	→ Rieti (loan)	7	(0)
2019–2020	Sora	0	(0)
2020–	Audace 1919	0	(0)
- * Club domestic league appearances and goals as of 5 May 2019

Roberto Criscuolo (born 21 February 1997) is an Italian football player. He plays for Audace 1919.

== Club career ==
He made his professional debut in the Serie B for Latina on 27 August 2016 in a game against Hellas Verona F.C.
