= Giacomo Ferrazzo =

Italian footballer

Personal information
- Date of birth: 2 March 1999 (age 27)
- Place of birth: San Donà di Piave, Italy
- Height: 1.79 m (5 ft 10 in)
- Position: Left back

Youth career
- Pordenone
- –2019: Sampdoria

Senior career*
Years	Team	Apps	(Gls)
2018–2019	→ Juve Stabia (loan)	1	(0)
2019–2021	Como	1	(0)
2021-	Spinea		
- * Club domestic league appearances and goals as of 20 January 2021

Giacomo Ferrazzo (born 2 March 1999) is an Italian footballer who plays as a defender.

== Career ==
=== Como ===
In July 2019, Ferrazzo moved to Como, signing a three-year contract. He made his league debut for the club on 24 November 2019, coming on as an 84th minute substitute for Gabriele De Nuzzo in a 4–1 victory over Pianese. On 22 January 2021, his contract was terminated by mutual consent.
