= Simone Moschin =

Italian footballer

Personal information
- Date of birth: 20 January 1995 (age 31)
- Place of birth: Vittorio Veneto, Italy
- Height: 1.88 m (6 ft 2 in)
- Position: Goalkeeper

Youth career
- –2014: Chievo

Senior career*
Years	Team	Apps	(Gls)
2014–2016	Chievo	0	(0)
2014–2015	→ Pisa (loan)	2	(0)
2015–2016	→ Renate (loan)	10	(0)
2016–2021	Pro Vercelli	0	(0)
2016–2017	→ Siena (loan)	36	(0)
2017–2018	→ Carrarese (loan)	11	(0)
2018	→ Cuneo (loan)	8	(0)
2021–2022	Fermana	4	(0)
2023	Pietà Hotspurs	4	(0)
2023	Džiugas	15	(0)
2024	Transinvest	11	(0)
2025	Feronikeli	14	(0)
2026	FK Riteriai	16	(0)
- * Club domestic league appearances and goals as of 2 July 2026

Simone Moschin (born 20 January 1995) is an Italian professional footballer who plays as a goalkeeper for Riteriai Club.

== Club career ==
Moschin started his career at Chievo; on 11 July 2014 Moschin left for Pisa on loan. Moschin made his Lega Pro (Serie C) debut for Pisa on 7 September 2014 in a game against Santarcangelo. At the end of season he returned to Cheivo, only loaned out again at the start of 2015–16 season.

In July 2016, Chievo sold Moschin to Serie B club Pro Vercelli for €4 million; at the same time the Verona-based team signed Mattia Bani from Vercelli also for €4 million.

Pro Vercelli immediately loaned Moschin to Lega Pro club Siena; in the next season Moschin was a player of another Serie C club Carrarese. On 14 January 2018 he left for Cuneo.

On 23 July 2021, he left Pro Vercelli and joined Fermana.

After spending six months without a club, on 31 January 2023 Moschin officially joined Maltese side Pietà Hotspurs on a free transfer.

On 8 July 2023, Moschin joined Lithuanian A Lyga side Džiugas.
