= Nicola Stefanelli =

Italian footballer

Personal information
- Date of birth: 14 April 1997 (age 29)
- Place of birth: Padua, Italy
- Height: 1.88 m (6 ft 2 in)
- Position: Centre back

Team information
- Current team: Bassano

Youth career
- –2014: Padova
- 2014–2016: Virtus Entella

Senior career*
Years	Team	Apps	(Gls)
2016–2018	Virtus Entella	0	(0)
2016–2017	→ Renate (loan)	0	(0)
2017	→ Gubbio (loan)	0	(0)
2017–2018	→ Mestre (loan)	11	(0)
2018–2019	AlbinoLeffe	22	(0)
2019–2021	Modena	14	(0)
2021–2022	Legnago	30	(0)
2022–2023	Plateola		
2023–	Bassano	15	(0)
- * Club domestic league appearances and goals as of 20 December 2023

Nicola Stefanelli (born 14 April 1997) is an Italian professional footballer who plays as a defender for Serie D club Bassano.

== Club career ==
He made his Serie C debut for Mestre on 8 October 2017 in a game against Feralpisalò.

On 11 July 2018, he joined Serie C side AlbinoLeffe.

For 2019–20 season, he joined Modena.

On 5 January 2021, he moved to Legnago.
