= Thomas Saloni =

Italian footballer

Personal information
- Date of birth: 17 July 1996 (age 30)
- Place of birth: La Spezia, Italy
- Height: 1.96 m (6 ft 5 in)
- Position: Goalkeeper

Youth career
- –2014: Valdivara
- 2014–2016: Spezia

Senior career*
Years	Team	Apps	(Gls)
2016–2019	Spezia	4	(0)
2016–2017	→ Prato (loan)	0	(0)
2017	→ Carrarese (loan)	0	(0)
2018	→ Virtus Francavilla (loan)	5	(0)
2018–2019	→ Monopoli (loan)	0	(0)
2019	→ Virtus Francavilla (loan)	2	(0)
2020	Siena	0	(0)
- * Club domestic league appearances and goals as of 22 February 2020

Thomas Saloni (born 17 July 1996) is an Italian footballer.

== Club career ==
He made his Serie B debut for Spezia on 14 October 2017 in a game against Ternana.

On 30 July 2018, he joined Monopoli on loan for the 2018–19 season.

On 17 January 2019, he joined Virtus Francavilla on loan for the second time.

On 13 February 2020, he signed with Serie C club Siena until the end of the 2019–20 season.
