= Mattia Bani =

Italian footballer (born 1993)

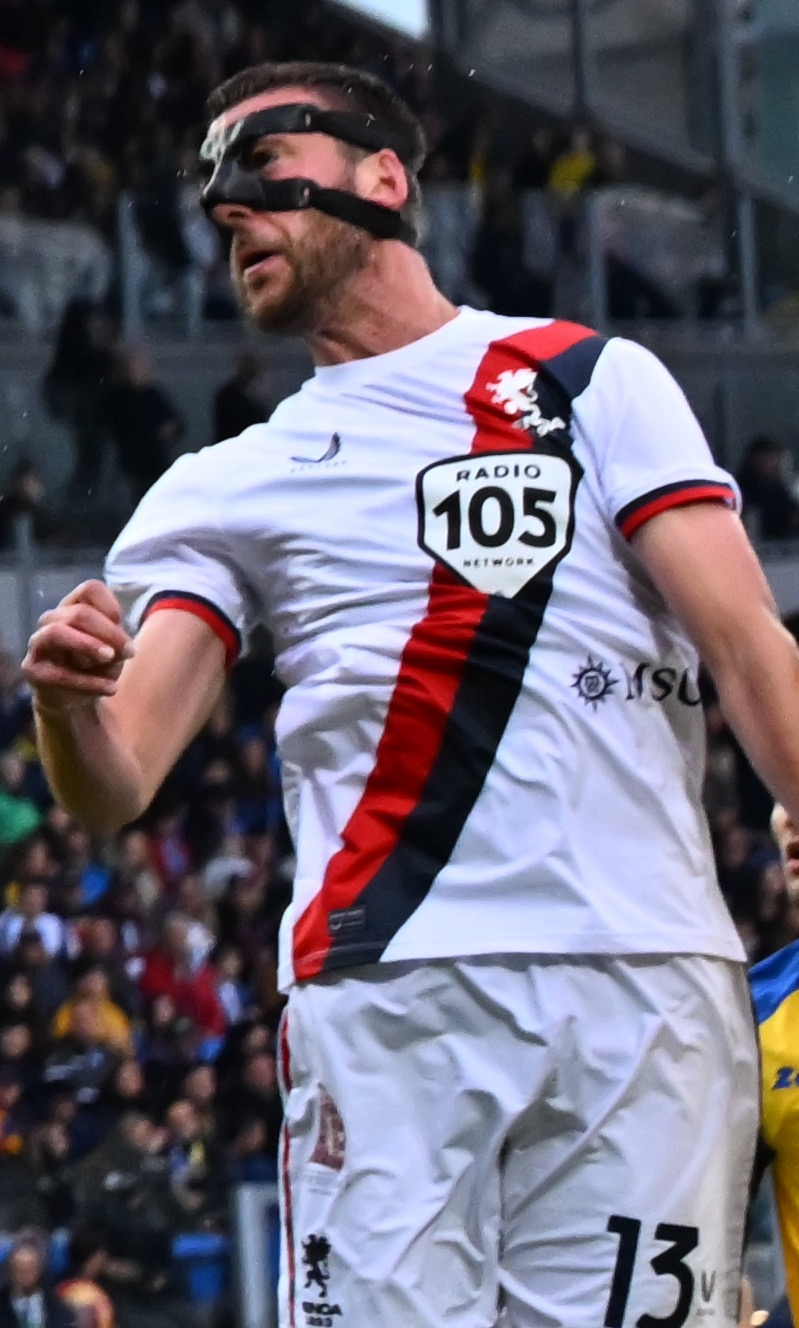

Personal information
- Date of birth: 10 December 1993 (age 32)
- Place of birth: Borgo San Lorenzo, Italy
- Height: 1.88 m (6 ft 2 in)
- Position: Centre-back

Team information
- Current team: Palermo
- Number: 13

Youth career
- Genoa

Senior career*
| Years | Team | Apps | (Gls) |
| 2012–2013 | Reggiana | 22 | (1) |
| 2013–2016 | Pro Vercelli | 57 | (2) |
| 2016–2019 | Chievo | 46 | (0) |
| 2016–2017 | → Pro Vercelli (loan) | 37 | (0) |
| 2019–2020 | Bologna | 27 | (4) |
| 2020–2025 | Genoa | 108 | (4) |
| 2021 | → Parma (loan) | 15 | (0) |
| 2025– | Palermo | 31 | (3) |
- * Club domestic league appearances and goals as of 12 May 2026

Mattia Bani (born 10 December 1993) is an Italian professional footballer who plays as a centre-back for Serie B club Palermo.

== Career ==
Born in Borgo San Lorenzo, Tuscany, Bani started his career at Ligurian club Genoa's under-20 team, which plays in Campionato Nazionale Primavera.

=== Reggiana ===
On 9 July 2012, Bani signed for Reggiana in a co-ownership deal for a peppercorn of €500. On 20 June 2013, Reggiana acquired Bani outright for free.

=== Pro Vercelli ===
On 3 July 2013, Bani joined Pro Vercelli in another co-ownership deal. In June 2014 the co-ownership of Bani and Ardizzone were renewed.

On 25 June 2015, Vercelli acquired the remaining 50% registration rights of Bani.

=== Chievo ===
On 28 July 2016, Bani moved to Serie A club Chievo from Pro Vercelli for €4 million transfer fee; at the same time Chievo sold goalkeeper Simone Moschin to Vercelli also for €4 million fee. Bani was immediately returned to Vercelli on a temporary deal.

Bani formally became part of the squad of Chievo in 2017–18 Serie A pre-season. He made his club debut in competitive match in the Italian cup; on 5 January 2018 Bani made his Serie A debut against Udinese.

=== Bologna ===
On 22 June 2019, Bani signed with Bologna.

=== Genoa ===
On 5 October 2020, he joined Genoa on a season-long loan with an obligation to buy.

=== Parma ===
On 1 February 2021, Bani joined Parma on loan with an option to buy until 30 June 2021.

=== Palermo ===
On 27 July 2025, Bani joined Serie B side Palermo with multi-years contract.

== Career statistics ==
As of match played 25 May 2025

Appearances and goals by club, season and competition
| Club | Season | League | | | National cup | | Continental | | Other | | Total | |
| Club | Season | Division | Apps | Goals | Apps | Goals | Apps | Goals | Apps | Goals | Apps | Goals |
|---|---|---|---|---|---|---|---|---|---|---|---|---|
| Reggiana | 2012–13 | Lega Pro | 22 | 1 | 1 | 0 | — | | 1 | 0 | 24 | 1 |
| Pro Vercelli | 2013–14 | Lega Pro | 10 | 1 | 1 | 0 | — | | — | | 11 | 1 |
| Pro Vercelli | 2014–15 | Serie B | 20 | 0 | 0 | 0 | — | | — | | 20 | 0 |
| Pro Vercelli | 2015–16 | Serie B | 27 | 1 | 0 | 0 | — | | — | | 27 | 1 |
| Pro Vercelli | 2016–17 | Serie B | 37 | 0 | 1 | 0 | — | | — | | 38 | 0 |
| Pro Vercelli | Total | | 94 | 2 | 2 | 0 | 0 | 0 | 0 | 0 | 96 | 2 |
| Chievo | 2017–18 | Serie A | 16 | 0 | 2 | 0 | — | | — | | 18 | 0 |
| Chievo | 2018–19 | Serie A | 30 | 0 | 1 | 0 | — | | — | | 31 | 0 |
| Chievo | Total | | 46 | 0 | 3 | 0 | 0 | 0 | 0 | 0 | 49 | 0 |
| Bologna | 2019–20 | Serie A | 27 | 4 | 0 | 0 | — | | — | | 27 | 4 |
| Genoa | 2020–21 | Serie A | 11 | 0 | 2 | 0 | — | | — | | 13 | 0 |
| Parma | 2020–21 | Serie A | 7 | 0 | 0 | 0 | — | | — | | 7 | 0 |
| Genoa | 2021–22 | Serie A | 17 | 0 | 2 | 0 | — | | — | | 19 | 0 |
| Genoa | 2022–23 | Serie B | 33 | 2 | 3 | 0 | — | | — | | 36 | 2 |
| Genoa | 2023–24 | Serie A | 27 | 2 | 1 | 0 | — | | — | | 28 | 2 |
| Genoa | 2024–25 | Serie A | 20 | 0 | 2 | 0 | — | | — | | 22 | 0 |
| Genoa | Total | | 108 | 4 | 10 | 0 | 0 | 0 | 0 | 0 | 118 | 4 |
| Career total | | | 304 | 11 | 16 | 0 | 0 | 0 | 1 | 0 | 321 | 11 |
