= Marco Valotti =

Italian footballer

Personal information
- Date of birth: 13 November 1995 (age 30)
- Place of birth: Montichiari, Italy
- Position: Forward

Team information
- Current team: Folgore Caratese

Youth career
- Brescia

Senior career*
Years	Team	Apps	(Gls)
2013–2017	Brescia	31	(1)
2015–2016	→ Renate (loan)	16	(3)
2016	→ Lumezzane (loan)	9	(1)
2016–2017	→ Fidelis Andria (loan)	5	(1)
2017	→ Lupa Roma (loan)	6	(0)
2017–2018	Virtus Francavilla	10	(0)
2018	Catanzaro	3	(0)
2018–	Folgore Caratese		

International career
2014	Italy U19	5	(0)
- * Club domestic league appearances and goals as of 22 April 2018

Marco Valotti (born 13 November 1995) is an Italian footballer who currently plays for Folgore Caratese as a forward.

== Career ==
Valotti made his professional debut with Brescia on 9 November 2013 against Avellino in a Serie B game. He came in as a 63rd-minute substitute for Vítor Saba in a 0-2 away defeat.

On 6 February 2014 Valotti signed a new 3 1/2-year contract with Brescia.

On 2 July 2015 Valotti was signed by Renate in a temporary deal.

== Career statistics ==
As of November 22, 2013

Club	Season	Serie B		Coppa Italia		International		Others		Total	
Club	Season	App	Goals	App	Goals	App	Goals	App	Goals	App	Goals
Brescia	2013–14	11	1	0	0	0	0	–	–	11	1
Brescia Total		11	1	0	0	0	0	0	0	11	1
