= Joakim Olausson =

Swedish footballer (born 1995)

Personal information
- Full name: Joakim Olausson
- Date of birth: 14 April 1995 (age 31)
- Place of birth: Nol, Sweden
- Height: 1.79 m (5 ft 10 in)
- Position: Midfielder

Team information
- Current team: Ljungskile SK
- Number: 6

Youth career
- –2011: Örgryte IS
- 2011–2014: Atalanta

Senior career*
Years	Team	Apps	(Gls)
2011	Örgryte IS	2	(0)
2014	Atalanta	1	(0)
2015	BK Häcken	1	(0)
2015	Örgryte IS	5	(0)
2016	Qviding FIF	7	(0)
2016	Perugia	0	(0)
2017	Assyriska BK	24	(4)
2018–2019	Utsiktens BK	52	(2)
2020–	Ljungskile SK	15	(0)

International career
2010–2012	Sweden U17	18	(1)
2012–2014	Sweden U19	14	(3)
- * Club domestic league appearances and goals as of 20:34, 13 September 2020 (UTC)

Joakim Olausson (born 14 April 1995) is a Swedish footballer who plays for Ljungskile SK as a midfielder.

== Club career ==
Olausson joined Atalanta in 2011 from Örgryte IS. He made his Serie A debut on 18 May 2014 in a 2–1 away defeat against Catania.

On 14 November 2019, Ljungskile SK announced the signing of Olausson.

== Career statistics ==
Club	Season	League			Cup			Continental			Total		
Club	Season	Apps	Goals	Assists	Apps	Goals	Assists	Apps	Goals	Assists	Apps	Goals	Assists
Atalanta	2013–14	1	0	0	0	0	0	0	0	0	1	0	0
Career total		1	0	0	0	0	0	0	0	0	1	0	0
