= Nura Abdullahi =

Nigerian footballer (born 1997)

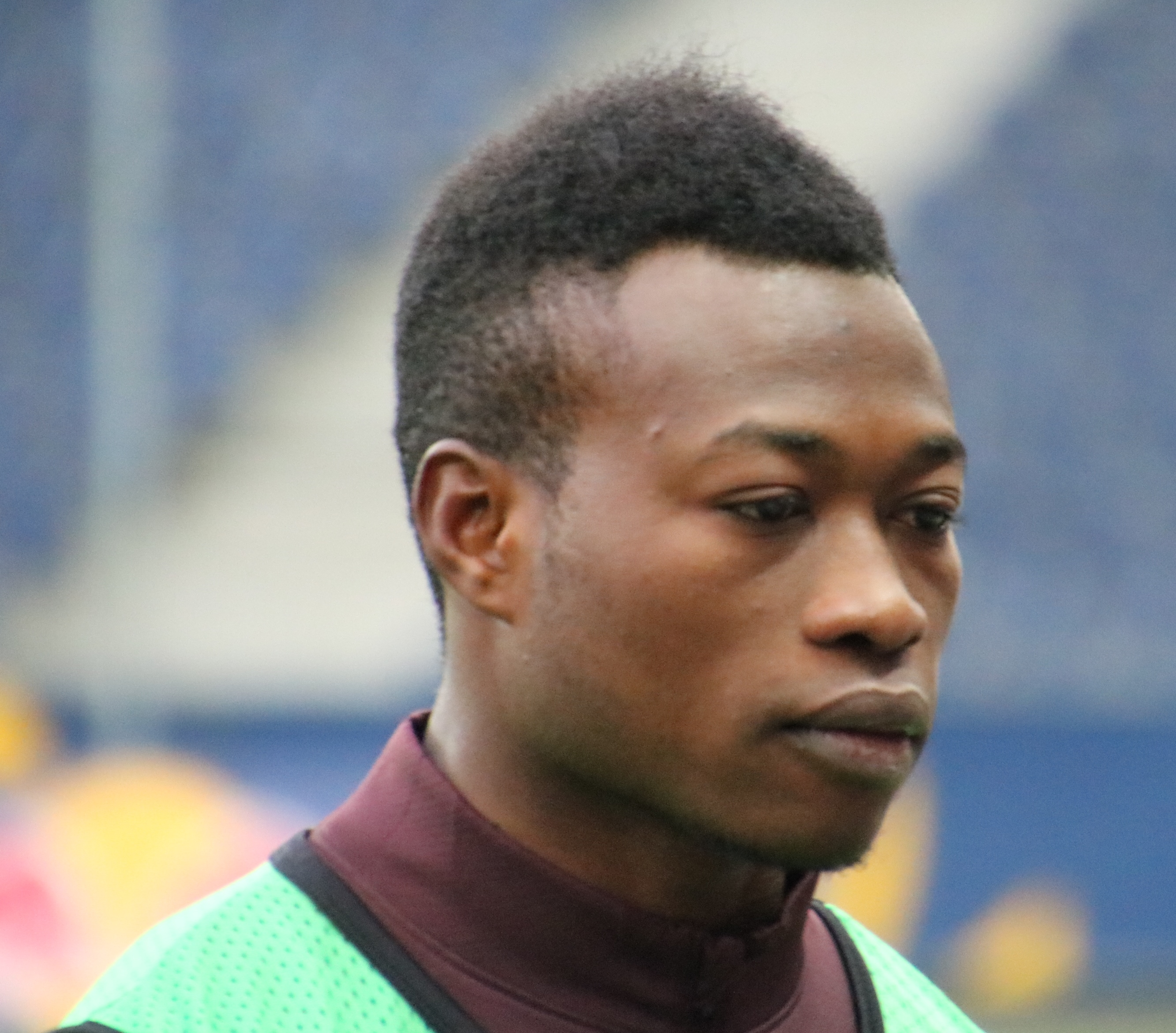
- Abdullahi in 2016

Personal information
- Date of birth: 17 August 1997 (age 29)
- Place of birth: Kachia, Nigeria
- Height: 1.82 m (6 ft 0 in)
- Position: Defender

Youth career
- –2013: Abuja

Senior career*
Years	Team	Apps	(Gls)
2013–2015	Spezia	0	(0)
2013–2014	→ Lavagnese (loan)	8	(2)
2015–2019	Roma	0	(0)
2018	→ Perugia (loan)	3	(0)
- * Club domestic league appearances and goals

Nura Abdullahi (born 17 August 1997) is a Nigerian former professional footballer who played as a defender.

== Career ==
Abdullahi made his Serie B debut for Perugia on 3 February 2018 in a game against Cittadella.

He retired in April 2019 on medical grounds.
