= Fausto Coppola =

Italian football player

Personal information
- Date of birth: 29 April 1997 (age 29)
- Place of birth: Naples, Italy
- Height: 1.75 m (5 ft 9 in)
- Position: Midfielder

Team information
- Current team: Manfredonia
- Number: 27

Youth career
- –2016: Virtus Entella

Senior career*
Years	Team	Apps	(Gls)
2016–2017	Virtus Entella	1	(0)
2016–2017	→ Akragas (loan)	35	(1)
2017–2019	AlbinoLeffe	22	(0)
2019	Viterbese	5	(0)
2020	Avezzano	4	(0)
2020–2021	Gladiator	32	(1)
2021–2022	Imperia	37	(6)
2022–2024	Gravina	53	(8)
2024–	Manfredonia	12	(0)
- * Club domestic league appearances and goals as of 17 November 2024

Fausto Coppola (born 29 April 1997) is an Italian football player who plays for Serie D club Manfredonia.

== Club career ==
He made his Serie B debut for Virtus Entella on 9 April 2016 in a game against Virtus Lanciano.

On 31 January 2019, he signed with Viterbese. From 21 January 2020, he play with Avezzano Calcio in serie D.
