= Stefano Cason =

Italian football player

Personal information
- Date of birth: 9 July 1995 (age 31)
- Place of birth: Belluno, Italy
- Height: 1.87 m (6 ft 1 1/2 in)
- Position: Centre back

Team information
- Current team: Nocerina
- Number: 5

Youth career
- –2014: Atalanta
- 2013–2014: → Varese (loan)

Senior career*
Years	Team	Apps	(Gls)
2014–2018	Atalanta	0	(0)
2014–2015	→ Siena (loan)	31	(5)
2015–2016	→ Melfi (loan)	33	(2)
2016–2017	→ Ternana (loan)	1	(0)
2017	→ Trapani (loan)	0	(0)
2017	→ Carrarese (loan)	17	(0)
2018	→ Catanzaro (loan)	1	(0)
2018–2019	Virtus Francavilla	18	(1)
2019–2020	Pianese	21	(0)
2020–2021	Matelica	17	(1)
2021	Fano	18	(0)
2021–	Nocerina	9	(0)
- * Club domestic league appearances and goals as of 7 November 2021

Stefano Cason (born 9 July 1995) is an Italian football player. He plays for Nocerina.

== Club career ==
He made his professional debut in the Lega Pro for Melfi on 6 September 2015 in a game against Juve Stabia and scored twice on his debut.

He joined Serie C club Virtus Francavilla on permanent basis on 7 July 2018, signing a 3-year contract.

On 14 July 2019, he signed with Pianese.

On 24 September 2020 he joined Matelica.

On 22 January 2021 he moved to Fano.

On 16 September 2021 he joined Nocerina in Serie D.
