= Gianmarco Gerevini =

Italian footballer (born 1993)

Personal information
- Date of birth: 11 May 1993 (age 33)
- Place of birth: Brescia, Italy
- Height: 1.81 m (5 ft 11 in)
- Position: Midfielder

Team information
- Current team: Luparense

Youth career
- Brescia

Senior career*
Years	Team	Apps	(Gls)
2012–2014	Brescia	0	(0)
2012–2014	→ Viareggio (loan)	34	(3)
2014–2017	Bologna	0	(0)
2014–2015	→ Ischia (loan)	17	(0)
2015–2016	→ Atlético CP (loan)	33	(3)
2016–2017	→ Olhanense (loan)	29	(2)
2017–2018	Matelica	27	(1)
2018–2019	Monterosi	33	(2)
2019	Latina	12	(0)
2019–2020	Adriese	10	(0)
2020–2021	Sona	30	(12)
2021–2022	Desenzano	31	(4)
2022–2023	Cjarlins Muzane	26	(2)
2023–2024	Campodarsego	26	(3)
2024–	Luparense	11	(0)
- * Club domestic league appearances and goals as of 10 November 2024

Gianmarco Gerevini (born 11 May 1993) is an Italian footballer who plays as a midfielder for Serie D club Luparense.

== Career ==
Born in Brescia, Lombardy, Gerevini was a youth product of hometown club Brescia Calcio. In summer 2012 he left the reserve team for Serie C1 club Viareggio in temporary deal. On 1 August 2013 he returned to the Tuscan town along with Nicola Falasco and Davide Ferrari.

On 27 June 2014, few days before the closure of 2013–14 financial year, Gerevini was sold to Bologna for €800,000. However Brescia also simultaneously signed Matteo Boccaccini from Bologna also for €800,000.

On 1 September 2014 Gerevini was signed by Ischia for the first Serie C season since 1978.

On 10 August 2015 he moved to Portuguese club Atlético Clube de Portugal. The club relegated at the end of season from the third division.
