= Lorenzo Vasco =

Italian footballer

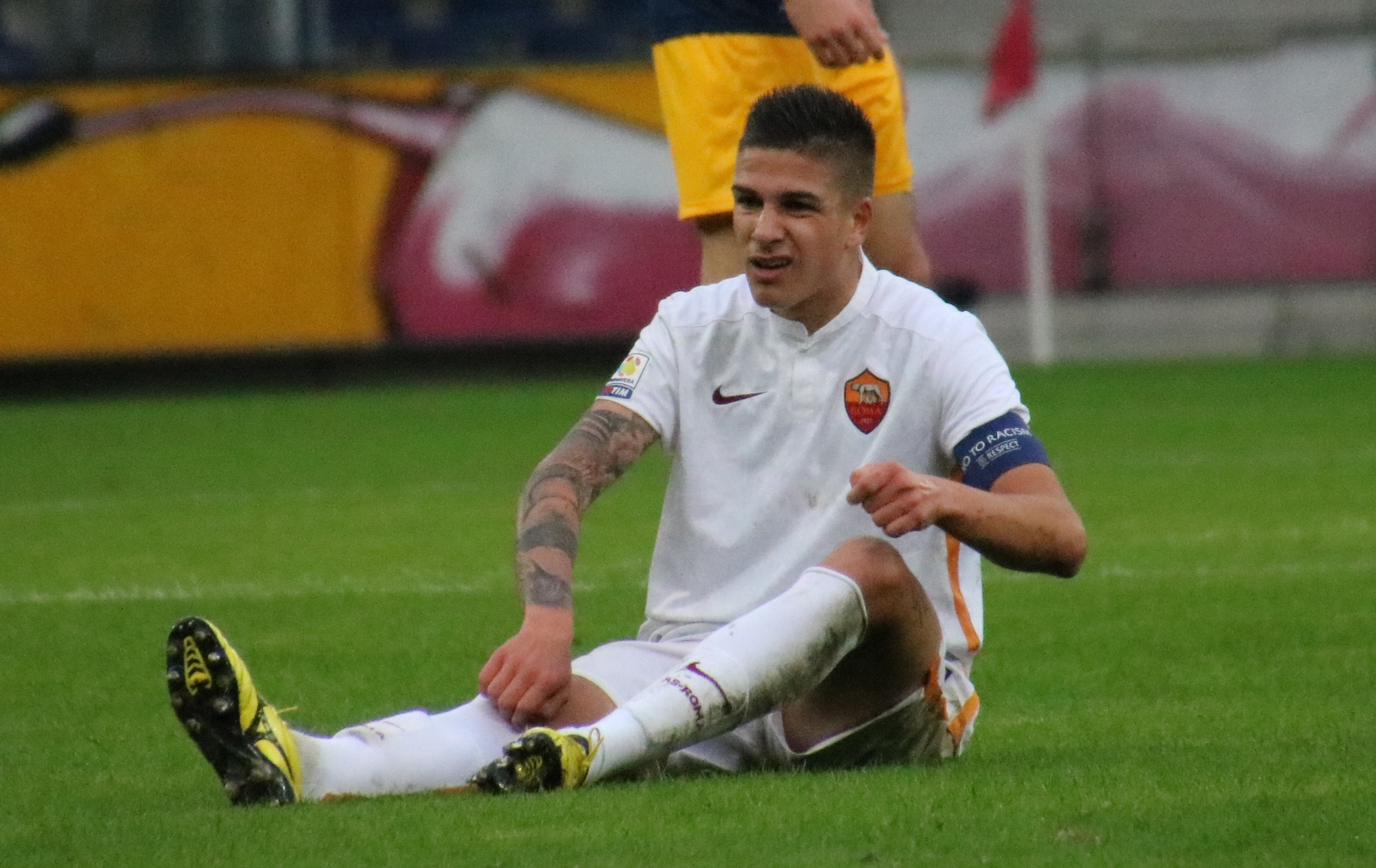
- Vasco during a UEFA Youth League game against Red Bull Salzburg

Personal information
- Date of birth: 19 June 1997 (age 29)
- Place of birth: Aprilia, Italy
- Height: 1.79 m (5 ft 10 1/2 in)
- Position: Midfielder

Team information
- Current team: Roma City
- Number: 5

Youth career
- Aprilia
- 2007–2014: Roma

Senior career*
Years	Team	Apps	(Gls)
2014–2018	Roma	0	(0)
2016–2017	→ Südtirol (loan)	7	(0)
2017	→ Fidelis Andria (loan)	10	(0)
2017–2018	→ Racing Fondi (loan)	23	(0)
2018–2019	Aprilia	23	(0)
2019–2021	Ostia Mare	34	(4)
2021	Aprilia	24	(8)
2021	Ostia Mare	9	(3)
2021–2022	Aprilia	19	(5)
2022–2023	Vis Artena	21	(4)
2023–	Roma City	1	(0)
- * Club domestic league appearances and goals as of 20 December 2023

Lorenzo Vasco (born 19 June 1997) is an Italian professional football midfielder who plays for Serie D club Roma City. Typically deployed in a more defensive-midfield role, he states that his role model is Yaya Touré.

== Career ==
=== Early career ===
Vasco was born in Aprilia, Lazio, Italy, and began his career in the youth teams of local side Aprilia, before he signed for Serie A giants Roma. He eventually made his way into the Primavera side, making over fifty appearances in the Campionato Nazionale Primavera and UEFA Youth League, and winning the former with Roma in the 2015–16 season. He was also the captain of the Primavera side during this triumph, and scored a vital penalty in the shoot-out against Juventus Primavera at the Mapei Stadium in Reggio-Emilia.

=== Loans ===
Vasco made a loan move in 2016, joining Lega Pro side Südtirol on an initial one-year loan. After making few appearances, Roma recalled the young midfielder early, in January 2017, and subsequently sent him out on another loan, this time to Fidelis Andria. He made his debut for the Leoni Azzurri on 22 January 2017, starting in central midfield and playing 58 minutes of a 1–1 draw with Catanzaro.
