= Tomasch Calore =

Italian football player

Personal information
- Date of birth: 22 January 1997 (age 29)
- Place of birth: Pescara, Italy
- Height: 1.88 m (6 ft 2 in)
- Position: Goalkeeper

Team information
- Current team: Spoltore

Youth career
- Villa Raspa
- –2015: Pescara

Senior career*
Years	Team	Apps	(Gls)
2015–2019	Pescara	0	(0)
2015–2016	→ San Nicolò (loan)	33	(0)
2016–2018	→ Teramo (loan)	27	(0)
2018–2019	→ Piacenza (loan)	0	(0)
2019–	Spoltore		
- * Club domestic league appearances and goals as of 15 June 2019

Tomasch Calore (born 22 January 1997) is an Italian football player born in Pescara. He plays for Spoltore.

== Club career ==
He made his Serie C debut for Teramo on 26 November 2016 in a game against Reggiana.
