= Nicola Falasco =

Italian footballer

Personal information
- Date of birth: 5 October 1993 (age 33)
- Place of birth: Piove di Sacco, Italy
- Height: 1.86 m (6 ft 1 in)
- Positions: Left-back; left midfielder

Team information
- Current team: Livorno
- Number: 54

Youth career
- Brescia

Senior career*
Years	Team	Apps	(Gls)
2012–2014	Brescia	0	(0)
2012–2013	→ Feralpisalò (loan)	14	(0)
2013–2014	→ Viareggio (loan)	24	(0)
2014–2016	Pistoiese	36	(0)
2016–2018	Roma	0	(0)
2016–2017	→ Cesena (loan)	17	(0)
2017–2018	→ Avellino (loan)	21	(0)
2018–2020	Perugia	41	(2)
2020–2022	Pordenone	41	(2)
2022–2024	Ascoli	60	(1)
2025	Trento	11	(0)
2025	Rimini	8	(1)
2026–	Livorno	11	(1)
- * Club domestic league appearances and goals as of 30 April 2026

Nicola Falasco (born 5 October 1993) is an Italian professional footballer who plays as a left-back for Serie C Group B club Livorno.

== Career ==
=== Early career ===
Born in Piove di Sacco, Veneto, Falasco started his career at Lombard club Brescia. In summer 2012 he was signed by Feralpisalò in a temporary deal. On 1 August 2013 Falasco, Ferrari and Gerevini were signed by Viareggio. On 4 August 2014 Falasco was signed by Pistoiese in another temporary deal. On 25 June 2015 Falasco renewed his contract with Pistoiese.

=== Roma and Cesena ===
On 1 February 2016, Falasco was signed by Roma for a €180,000 fee (plus €20,000 to agent(s)) in a 4 1/2-year contract. He immediately left for Serie B club Cesena in a half-season temporary deal, with an option to purchase.

Having made six appearances including four starts for Cesena, he rejoined the club on a season-long loan on 5 July 2016, again with an option to purchase for Cesena as well as buy-back clause for Roma.

=== Avellino ===
On 29 June 2017, Falasco was signed by Avellino on loan, with an obligation to sign outright at the end of season.

=== Perugia ===
On 9 August 2018, he signed a three-year contract with Serie B club Perugia.

=== Pordenone ===
Falasco signed for Pordenone from Perugia for €180,000 on the 9 September 2020.

=== Ascoli ===
On 13 January 2022, he moved to Ascoli on a one-and-a-half-year contract.
