= Marco Martin =

Italian footballer

Personal information
- Full name: Marco Martin
- Date of birth: December 25, 1987 (age 38)
- Place of birth: Pordenone, Italy
- Height: 1.75 m (5 ft 9 in)
- Position: Left back

Team information
- Current team: San Pietro
- Number: 11

Youth career
- Treviso

Senior career*
Years	Team	Apps	(Gls)
2006–2009	Treviso	3	(0)
2007–2008	→ Viterbese (loan)	26	(0)
2009–2015	Südtirol	148	(6)
2012	→ Pescara (loan)	1	(0)
2015–2016	Pavia	13	(0)
2016	Pordenone	17	(0)
2016–2017	Cittadella	15	(0)
2017–2019	FeralpiSalò	42	(1)
2019	Vicenza Virtus	12	(0)
2020–	Montebelluna	17	(2)
- * Club domestic league appearances and goals as of 17:33, 15 February 2021 (UTC)

Marco Martin (born 25 December 1987) is an Italian footballer who plays as a defender for San Pietro in Promozione.

== Career ==
Martin was acquired by Pescara on loan from Südtirol on 27 December 2011 to strengthen the team's defensive core. He was half of the duo brought in by Zdeněk Zeman during the winter transfer window, along with midfielder Matti Lund Nielsen.

On 30 June 2015 Martin was signed by Pavia.

On 14 January 2019, he joined Vicenza Virtus.
