= João Silva (footballer, born 1998) =

Portuguese footballer

João da Silva
Personal information
- Full name: João Afonso Paula da Silva
- Date of birth: 1 February 1998 (age 28)
- Place of birth: Coimbra, Portugal
- Height: 1.89 m (6 ft 2 in)
- Position: Centre back

Team information
- Current team: ASD Chisola Calcio
- Number: 23

Youth career
- 2006–2009: Futsal
- 2009–2011: Alto Colina
- 2011–2012: Imortal
- 2012–2013: Benfica
- 2013–2014: Imortal
- 2014–2015: Juventus
- 2015–2017: Udinese
- 2016–2017: → Virtus Entella (loan)
- 2017–2018: Palermo

Senior career*
Years	Team	Apps	(Gls)
2018	Palermo	0	(0)
2018–2020	Trapani	31	(0)
2020	Bisceglie	6	(0)
2020–2021	FC Messina	20	(0)
2021–2022	Olhanense	28	(1)
2022–2023	Fasano	23	(0)
2023	Lamezia	7	(0)
2023–2024	Chieri	24	(0)
2024–2025	Akragas	21	(1)
2025	Lucchese 1905	1	(0)
2025-2026	FC Pompei		

International career
	Portugal U18	1	(0)
- * Club domestic league appearances and goals as of 17 November 2024

João Afonso Paula da Silva (born 1 February 1998) is a Portuguese professional footballer who plays as a defender for Italian Serie D club FC Pompei.

== Football career ==
On 27 October 2018, Silva made his professional debut with Trapani in a 2018–19 Serie C match against Cavese.

On 29 January 2020, he signed with Serie C club Bisceglie.
