= Audace 1919 =

Italian football club

- Full name: Audace 1919
- Founded: 1919
- Ground: Stadio Le Rose; Genazzano,
- Chairman: Giuseppe Spinelli
- Manager: Daniele Scarfini
- League: Eccellenza Lazio
Home colours	Away colours

Audace 1919 is an Italian association football club based in Genazzano, Lazio.

== History ==
They will play in season 2021–22 on Eccellenza Lazio championship.

== Colors and badge ==
The team's colors are blue, white and red.

== Staff ==
As of 16 July 2020

Position	Name
Manager	Ruggero Susini
Goalkeeper Coach	Renato Cera
Athletic Trainer	Giammarco Schiavoni
Technical Assistant, Match Analyst	Alessandro Imbrogno
Team Manager	Angelo Manni
