= Francesco Posocco =

Italian footballer

Personal information
- Date of birth: 28 April 1996 (age 30)
- Place of birth: Vittorio Veneto, Italy
- Height: 1.82 m (5 ft 11 1/2 in)
- Position: Wide midfielder

Team information
- Current team: A.C.Mestre
- Number: 11

Senior career*
Years	Team	Apps	(Gls)
2011–2014	Vittorio Falmec		
2014–2015	Belluno	30	(5)
2015–2018	SPAL	5	(1)
2016–2017	→ Santarcangelo (loan)	23	(0)
2017–2018	→ Pontedera (loan)	25	(1)
2018–2019	Catanzaro	7	(0)
2019	Clodiense	4	(0)
2020–2021	Belluno	31	(3)
2021–2022	Dolomiti Bellunesi	30	(4)
2022–	Treviso	16	(6)
- * Club domestic league appearances and goals as of 20 December 2023

Francesco Posocco (born 28 April 1996) is an Italian football player who plays for Serie D club A.C.Mestre.

== Club career ==
He made his Serie C debut for SPAL on 26 September 2015 in a game against Pontedera.

On 28 October 2019 he joined Serie D club Clodiense, and on 13 December he was released from his contract.
