= ASD Albissole 1909 =

Italian football club

Albissola
- Full name: Associazione Sportiva Dilettantistica; Albissole 1909
- Founded: 1909; 2010 (merger); 2019 (refounded)
- Ground: Faraggiana, Albissola Marina, Italy
- Capacity: 500
- Chairman: Lorenzo Barlassina
- Manager: Carlo Sarpero
- League: Promozione Liguria A
- 2024–25: Promozione Liguria A, 6th
Home colours	Away colours	Third colours

Associaione Sportiva Dilettantistica Albissole 1909, or simply Albissole, is an Italian association football club, jointly representing the towns of Albissola Marina and Albisola Superiore, Province of Savona, Liguria.

== History ==
The club, named initially Associazione Sportiva Dilettantistica Albissola 2010, was born in 2010 as the consequence of several mergers involving different football teams based in the bordering cities of Albissola Marina and Albisola Superiore.

Starting as a Prima Categoria club, ASD Albissola achieved its first promotion in the 2011–12 season. In 2015–16, it began to climb above all the amateur leagues by winning consecutively the Promozione and Eccellenza regional leagues in back-to-back seasons.

In 2017–18, on its first season of appearance in the Serie D, Albissola won the group title, thus ensuring itself a spot in the professional Serie C league for the 2018–19 season.

Due to the unsuitability of the historic home stadium "Faraggiana" to comply with Serie C regulations, Albissola starts the 2018–19 season by temporarily playing its home games in the Stadio Comunale of Chiavari (the same venue as fellow Serie C club Virtus Entella) until finding a way to adequate the Albissola's stadium or to build a new home ground.

After escaping relegation in its first Serie C campaign, however, Albissola did not submit an application to take part in the following 2019–20 Serie C season due to not having been able to find a suitable home venue; the club had to restart from the amateur leagues, eventually entering the Seconda Categoria league.
