= SSD Ischia Calcio =

Italian football club

Ischia Calcio
- Full name: Società Sportiva Dilettantistica; Ischia Calcio
- Founded: 1922; 1998; 2017
- Ground: Stadio Enzo Mazzella, Ischia, Italy
- Capacity: 5,000
- President: Luigi Lauro
- Team Manager: Augustine Good
- League: Serie D Group G
- 2023–24: Serie D Group G, 4th of 18
Home colours	Away colours	Third colours

Società Sportiva Dilettantistica Ischia Calcio (formerly Societa Sportiva Ischia Isolaverde, better known simply as Ischia) is an amateur Italian association football club located in Ischia, Campania. It currently plays in Serie D, the fourth tier of Italian football.

== History ==
Ischia played in Serie C2 from 1983 to 1987, and then Serie C1 until 1990, when Ischia were relegated to Serie C2. Ischia returned to Serie C1 the next year and played in the third-highest-ranked Italian division until 1998 when the club was excluded by the federation due to financial troubles.

=== Scudetto Dilettanti 2012–13 and back into professionalism ===
In 2012–13, Ischia was promoted to Lega Pro Seconda Divisione and won also the Scudetto Dilettanti under the guidance of head coach Salvatore Campilongo. The club's first season back into professionalism in 2013–14 was more troublesome as head coach Campilongo was sacked during the season and replaced with Antonio Porta, who led the club to a respectable seventh place and a spot in the inaugural season of the unified Lega Pro league, the new third tier of Italian football. After the end of the season, chairman Raffaele Carlino (a national clothing entrepreneur) relinquished his role on the board, remaining only as the main club sponsor, and former Napoli goalkeeper and Ischia local Giuseppe Taglialatela was named as the new chairman for a few weeks before he resigned to become a goalkeeper coach because of a defeat against Paganese Calcio 1926.

== Honours ==
Serie D:

- Scudetto Dilettanti: Winners 1: 2012–13
- Winners (1): 2012–13
