= List of Italian football transfers summer 2015 =

This is a list of Italian football transfers featuring at least one Serie A or Serie B club which were completed after the end of the 2014–15 season and before the end of the 2015 summer transfer window. The window formally opened on 1 July and closed on 31 August 2015 (two months), but Lega Serie A and Lega Serie B accepted to document any transfer before that day; however, those players would only able to play for their new club at the start of the 2015–16 season. Free agents could join any club at any time. Ascoli and Virtus Entella were given ten extra days to complete signatures. This list does not include co-ownership resolutions, which had to be resolved no later than 25 June 2015.

== July to September 2015 ==
Legend

- Those clubs in Italic indicate that the player already left on loan in previous season or that the player is a 2015 new signing who immediately left the club.

| Date | Name | Moving from | Moving to | Fee |
|---|---|---|---|---|
| 21 January 2015 (Note: The player contract will be effective on 1 July 2015) | (Netherlands) Wesley Hoedt | (Netherlands) AZ | Lazio | Free |
| 25 March 2015 | (Finland) Niklas Moisander | (Netherlands) Ajax | Sampdoria | Free |
| 27 April 2015 | (Spain) José Ángel Crespo | Bologna | (Spain) Córdoba | Undisclosed (Note: The player already played for his new club in 2014–15 season, the deal turned from temporary to definitive.) |
| 13 May 2015 | (Brazil) Robinho | Milan | Unattached | Released |
| 15 May 2015 | (Argentina) Leandro Paredes | (Argentina) Boca Juniors | Roma | €4,5M |
| 2 June 2015 | (Ghana) Michael Essien | Milan | (Greece) Panathinaikos | Free |
| 3 June 2015 | (Argentina) Gonzalo Bergessio | Sampdoria | (Mexico) Club Atlas | Free |
| 4 June 2015 | Davide Raffaello | Lupa Roma | Trapani | Free |
| 4 June 2015 | (Switzerland) David Da Costa | (Switzerland) Zürich | Novara | Undisclosed |
| 4 June 2015 | (Argentina) Paulo Dybala | Palermo | Juventus | €32M |
| 5 June 2015 | Salvatore Caturano | Melfi | Bari | Undisclosed |
| 8 June 2015 | (North Macedonia) Aleksandar Trajkovski | (Belgium) Zulte Waregem | Palermo | Undisclosed |
| 8 June 2015 | Davide Biraschi | Grosseto | Avellino | Undisclosed |
| 8 June 2015 | (Libya) Ahmad Benali | Brescia | Palermo | Free |
| 9 June 2015 | (Germany) Sami Khedira | (Spain) Real Madrid | Juventus | Free |
| 9 June 2015 | (Brazil) Rodrigo Ely | Avellino | Milan | Free |
| 9 June 2015 | Adriano Montalto | Martina Franca | Trapani | Undisclosed |
| 9 June 2015 | (Spain) Patric | (Spain) Barcelona | Lazio | Free |
| 9 June 2015 | (Czech Republic) Milan Nitrianský | (Czech Republic) Slavia Prague | Avellino | Undisclosed |
| 10 June 2015 | (Spain) Pedro Obiang | Sampdoria | (England) West Ham United | Undisclosed |
| 11 June 2015 | Daniel Offredi | AlbinoLeffe | Avellino | Undisclosed |
| 11 June 2015 | (Bosnia and Herzegovina) Ervin Zukanović | (Belgium) Gent | Chievo | Undisclosed |
| 13 June 2015 | Angelo Rea | Varese | Avellino | Free |
| 17 June 2015 | (Brazil) Danilo Avelar | Cagliari | Torino | Undisclosed |
| 17 June 2015 | Antonio Barreca | Torino | Cagliari | Loan |
| 19 June 2015 | (Ghana) Afriyie Acquah | (Germany) TSG Hoffenheim | Torino | Undisclosed |
| 19 June 2015 | (Germany) Giuseppe Gemiti | Livorno | Bari | Free |
| 20 June 2015 | Mirko Valdifiori | Empoli | Napoli | Undisclosed |
| 21 June 2015 | (Bosnia and Herzegovina) Enis Nadarević | Genoa | Trapani | Undisclosed |
| 21 June 2015 | Romano Perticone | Empoli | Trapani | Undisclosed |
| 22 June 2015 | (France) Geoffrey Kondogbia | (France) Monaco | Internazionale | Undisclosed |
| 22 June 2015 | (Croatia) Mario Mandžukić | (Spain) Atlético Madrid | Juventus | €19M |
| 22 June 2015 | Luca Checchin | Alessandria | Verona | Undisclosed |
| 22 June 2015 | Paolo Bartolomei | Pontedera | Teramo | Undisclosed |
| 23 June 2015 | Tommaso Bianco | Delta Porto Tolle | Avellino | Undisclosed |
| 23 June 2015 | (Guinea) Amadou Diawara | San Marino | Bologna | Undisclosed |
| 23 June 2015 | Federico Melchiorri | Pescara | Cagliari | Undisclosed |
| 23 June 2015 | Luca Rossettini | Cagliari | Bologna | Undisclosed |
| 23 June 2015 | (Argentina) Roberto Pereyra | Udinese | Juventus | €14M |
| 23 June 2015 | (Greece) Savvas Gentsoglou | (Greece) Ergotelis | Bari | Undisclosed |
| 23 June 2015 | Riccardo Bocalon | Internazionale | Alessandria | Undisclosed |
| 23 June 2015 | (Spain) Pepe Reina | (Germany) Bayern Munich | Napoli | Undisclosed |
| 24 June 2015 | (Argentina) Diego Novaretti | Lazio | (Mexico) Club León | Released |
| 24 June 2015 | (Ivory Coast) Sol Bamba | Palermo | (England) Leeds United | Undisclosed |
| 24 June 2015 | Gianmario Comi | Milan | Livorno | Loan |
| 24 June 2015 | Marco Ezio Fossati | Milan | Cagliari | Free |
| 24 June 2015 | Manuel De Luca | Südtirol | Torino | Undisclosed |
| 24 June 2015 | Juri Cisotti | Chievo | Spezia | Undisclosed |
| 24 June 2015 | (Brazil) Diego Farias | Chievo | Cagliari | Undisclosed |
| 24 June 2015 | Emiliano Viviano | Palermo | Sampdoria | Loan (Note: This is a deal with an obligation to automatically buy the player at the end of the loan) |
| 24 June 2015 | (Cameroon) Samuel Eto'o | Sampdoria | (Turkey) Antalyaspor | Free |
| 25 June 2015 | (Croatia) Josip Elez | Lazio | (Denmark) Aarhus | Loan |
| 25 June 2015 | (Slovenia) Jasmin Kurtić | Sassuolo | Atalanta | Undisclosed |
| 26 June 2015 | (Argentina) Carlos Tevez | Juventus | (Argentina) Boca Juniors | €6,5M |
| 26 June 2015 | Mario Piccinocchi | Milan | Vicenza | Undisclosed |
| 26 June 2015 | (France) Maxime Giron | Chieti | Avellino | Undisclosed |
| 26 June 2015 | Raffaele Maiello | Napoli | Crotone | Undisclosed |
| 26 June 2015 | Gian Marco Ferrari | Parma | Crotone | Free |
| 27 June 2015 | Marco Sansovini | Virtus Entella | Pescara | Undisclosed |
| 27 June 2015 | Gianluca Barba | Atalanta | Pescara | €1.5 million (swap with Di Rocco) |
| 27 June 2015 | Denis Di Rocco | Pescara | Atalanta | €1.5 million (swap with Barba) |
| 27 June 2015 | Michele Fornasier | Sampdoria | Pescara | Undisclosed |
| 27 June 2015 | Vittorio Esposito | Chieti | Pescara | Undisclosed |
| 27 June 2015 | (Uruguay) Lucas Torreira | Pescara | Sampdoria | Undisclosed |
| 27 June 2015 | (Uruguay) Lucas Torreira | Sampdoria | Pescara | Loan |
| 27 June 2015 | Davide Bassi | Empoli | Atalanta | Free |
| 29 June 2015 | (Brazil) Matheus Cassini | (Brazil) Corinthians | Palermo | Undisclosed |
| 29 June 2015 | Kevin Magri | Chievo | Vicenza | Undisclosed |
| 29 June 2015 | (Slovenia) Damir Bartulovič | Vicenza | Chievo | Undisclosed |
| 29 June 2015 | (Argentina) Lucas Castro | Catania | Chievo | Undisclosed |
| 29 June 2015 | Matteo Pessina | Monza | Milan | Undisclosed |
| 29 June 2015 | Andrea Bertolacci | Roma | Milan | €20M |
| 30 June 2015 | Matteo Brunelli | Carpi | Chievo | Undisclosed |
| 30 June 2015 | (Ghana) Sulley Muntari | Milan | Unattached | Released |
| 30 June 2015 | Dejan Danza | Pro Vercelli | Reggiana | Loan |
| 30 June 2015 | Luca Rizzo | Sampdoria | Bologna | Loan |
| 30 June 2015 | Massimo Gobbi | Parma | Chievo | Free |
| 30 June 2015 | Claudio Sparacello | Tiger Brolo | Trapani | Undisclosed |
| 30 June 2015 | (Serbia) Zdravko Kuzmanović | Internazionale | (Switzerland) Basel | Undisclosed |
| 30 June 2015 | (France) Samuel Souprayen | (France) Dijon | Verona | Free |
| 30 June 2015 | Federico Viviani | Roma | Verona | €4M |
| 30 June 2015 | Lorenzo Pellegrini | Roma | Sassuolo | €1,25M |
| 30 June 2015 | (Poland) Łukasz Skorupski | Roma | Empoli | 2-year loan |
| 30 June 2015 | (Bosnia and Herzegovina) Rade Krunić | (Serbia) Borac Čačak | Empoli | Undisclosed |
| 1 July 2015 | (Paraguay) Édgar Barreto | Palermo | Sampdoria | Free |
| 1 July 2015 | (Czech Republic) Matěj Vydra | Udinese | (England) Watford | Undisclosed |
| 1 July 2015 | Alessio Esposito | Gubbio | Pro Vercelli | Free |
| 1 July 2015 | (Spain) Iago Falque | Genoa | Roma | Loan |
| 1 July 2015 | Thomas Manfredini | Sassuolo | Vicenza | Undisclosed |
| 1 July 2015 | (France) Adil Rami | Milan | (Spain) Sevilla | Undisclosed |
| 1 July 2015 | Luigi Scaglia | Brescia | Latina | Free |
| 1 July 2015 | (Denmark) Simon Makienok | Palermo | (England) Charlton | Loan |
| 1 July 2015 | (Brazil) Miranda | (Spain) Atlético Madrid | Internazionale | Loan |
| 1 July 2015 | (Poland) Kamil Wilczek | (Poland) Piast Gliwice | Carpi | Free |
| 1 July 2015 | Luca Valzania | Cesena | Atalanta | Undisclosed |
| 1 July 2015 | (Albania) Isnik Alimi | Chievo | Atalanta | Undisclosed |
| 1 July 2015 | Davide Savi | Atalanta | Chievo | Undisclosed |
| 1 July 2015 | Francesco Signori | Modena | Novara | Free |
| 1 July 2015 | (Iraq) Ali Adnan | (Turkey) Çaykur Rizespor | Udinese | Undisclosed |
| 2 July 2015 | Pasquale Fazio | Ternana | Trapani | Free |
| 2 July 2015 | Christian Puggioni | Chievo | Sampdoria | Free |
| 2 July 2015 | Andrea Rispoli | Parma | Palermo | Free |
| 2 July 2015 | (Colombia) Carlos Bacca | (Spain) Sevilla | Milan | €30M |
| 2 July 2015 | Luca Siligardi | Livorno | Verona | Free |
| 2 July 2015 | Mattia Cassani | Parma | Sampdoria | Free |
| 2 July 2015 | Luca Valzania | Atalanta | Cesena | Loan |
| 2 July 2015 | Alberto Brignoli | Juventus | Sampdoria | Loan |
| 2 July 2015 | (Nigeria) Joel Obi | Internazionale | Torino | Undisclosed |
| 2 July 2015 | (Greece) José Holebas | Roma | (England) Watford | €2,5M |
| 2 July 2015 | Mattia Sprocati | Parma | Pro Vercelli | Free |
| 2 July 2015 | Matteo Politano | Roma | Sassuolo | Loan |
| 2 July 2015 | (Brazil) Luiz Adriano | (Ukraine) Shakhtar Donetsk | Milan | Undisclosed |
| 3 July 2015 | (Brazil) Tulio Bagatini | Este | Trapani | Undisclosed |
| 3 July 2015 | (Slovenia) Valter Birsa | Milan | Chievo | Undisclosed |
| 3 July 2015 | Francesco Benussi | Verona | Carpi | Free |
| 3 July 2015 | Samuel Di Carmine | Juve Stabia | Perugia | Undisclosed |
| 3 July 2015 | (Switzerland) Roberto Rodríguez | (Switzerland) St. Gallen | Novara | Undisclosed |
| 3 July 2015 | Filippo Berra | Udinese | Pro Vercelli | Undisclosed |
| 3 July 2015 | Marco Storari | Juventus | Cagliari | Undisclosed |
| 3 July 2015 | (Colombia) Jeison Murillo | (Spain) Granada | Internazionale | Undisclosed |
| 3 July 2015 | Andrea Palazzi | Internazionale | Livorno | Loan |
| 3 July 2015 | Roberto Codromaz | Udinese | FeralpiSalò | Undisclosed |
| 3 July 2015 | (Brazil) Neto | Fiorentina | Juventus | Free |
| 3 July 2015 | Antonio Mirante | Parma | Bologna | Free |
| 3 July 2015 | (Sweden) Valmir Berisha | Roma | (Netherlands) Cambuur | Loan |
| 3 July 2015 | Andrea Gemignani | Empoli | Pontedera | Loan |
| 3 July 2015 | Matteo Ricci | Empoli | Livorno | Loan |
| 3 July 2015 | (Colombia) Víctor Ibarbo | Cagliari | Roma | Loan |
| 3 July 2015 | Federico Mattiello | Juventus | Chievo | Loan |
| 3 July 2015 | (Uruguay) Walter Gargano | Napoli | (Mexico) Monterrey | Undisclosed |
| 3 July 2015 | (Spain) Martín Montoya | (Spain) Barcelona | Internazionale | Loan |
| 3 July 2015 | (Argentina) Rubén Botta | Internazionale | (Mexico) Pachuca | Undisclosed |
| 6 July 2015 | Andrea Pirlo | Juventus | (United States) New York City | Free |
| 6 July 2015 | (Portugal) Pedro Mendes | Parma | (France) Stade Rennais | Free |
| 6 July 2015 | (Ghana) Yussif Raman Chibsah | Sassuolo | Frosinone | Loan |
| 6 July 2015 | (Cameroon) Joseph Minala | Lazio | Latina | Loan |
| 6 July 2015 | Riccardo Secondo | Pro Vercelli | Pontedera | Loan |
| 6 July 2015 | Alessandro Ligi | Bari | Avellino | Loan |
| 6 July 2015 | (Argentina) José Mauri | Parma | Milan | Free |
| 6 July 2015 | (Brazil) Alan Empereur | Livorno | Teramo | Undisclosed |
| 6 July 2015 | (Brazil) Fernando | (Ukraine) Shakhtar Donetsk | Sampdoria | Undisclosed |
| 7 July 2015 | (North Macedonia) Stefan Ristovski | Parma | Spezia | Free |
| 7 July 2015 | (North Macedonia) Stefan Ristovski | Spezia | (Croatia) HNK Rijeka | Loan |
| 7 July 2015 | Denis Tonucci | Modena | Bari | Undisclosed |
| 7 July 2015 | Giovanni Sbrissa | Vicenza | Sassuolo | Undisclosed |
| 7 July 2015 | Giovanni Sbrissa | Sassuolo | Vicenza | Loan |
| 7 July 2015 | (North Macedonia) Goran Pandev | (Turkey) Galatasaray | Genoa | Free |
| 7 July 2015 | Nicola Ravaglia | Parma | Cremonese | Free |
| 7 July 2015 | (Brazil) Jefferson | Livorno | Latina | Undisclosed |
| 7 July 2015 | Massimo Volta | Sampdoria | Perugia | Undisclosed |
| 7 July 2015 | Paolo Regoli | Pontedera | Latina | Undisclosed |
| 7 July 2015 | Francesco Karkalis | Pescara | Maceratese | Loan |
| 7 July 2015 | Mattia Valoti | AlbinoLeffe | Verona | Free |
| 7 July 2015 | Mattia Placido | Sampdoria | Pistoiese | Loan |
| 7 July 2015 | Simone Zaza | Sassuolo | Juventus | €18M |
| 7 July 2015 | Leonardo Pavoletti | Sassuolo | Genoa | Undisclosed |
| 7 July 2015 | Andrea Accardi | Palermo | Trapani | Loan |
| 7 July 2015 | Mario Piccinocchi | Vicenza | (Switzerland) Lugano | Loan |
| 8 July 2015 | (Brazil) Ryder Matos | Fiorentina | Carpi | Loan |
| 8 July 2015 | Giuseppe Maiorano | Internazionale | Ancona | Loan |
| 8 July 2015 | Luca Marrone | Juventus | Carpi | Loan |
| 8 July 2015 | Carlo Crialese | Cesena | Cremonese | Loan |
| 8 July 2015 | Federico Di Francesco | Parma | Virtus Lanciano | Free |
| 8 July 2015 | Marco Di Benedetto | Juventus | Virtus Lanciano | Undisclosed |
| 8 July 2015 | Filippo Penna | Juventus | Virtus Lanciano | Undisclosed |
| 8 July 2015 | Alex Cordaz | Parma | Crotone | Free |
| 8 July 2015 | Marco Firenze | Sestri Levante | Crotone | Undisclosed |
| 8 July 2015 | Lorenzo Caselli | Sassuolo | Catanzaro | Undisclosed |
| 8 July 2015 | Francesco Bergamini | Bologna | Arezzo | Loan |
| 8 July 2015 | Antonio Calabrese | Bologna | Arezzo | Loan |
| 9 July 2015 | (Portugal) Diogo Figueiras | (Spain) Sevilla | Genoa | Loan |
| 9 July 2015 | Gianluca Pollace | Lazio | Salernitana | Loan |
| 9 July 2015 | (Iceland) Birkir Bjarnason | Pescara | (Switzerland) Basel | Undisclosed |
| 9 July 2015 | (Argentina) Matías Silvestre | Internazionale | Sampdoria | Free |
| 9 July 2015 | Andrea Arrighini | Avellino | Cosenza | Loan |
| 9 July 2015 | (Romania) Mihai Bălașa | Roma | Crotone | Loan |
| 9 July 2015 | Federico Ricci | Roma | Crotone | Loan |
| 9 July 2015 | Janis Cavagna | Atalanta | Trapani | Loan |
| 9 July 2015 | Daniele Verde | Roma | Frosinone | Loan |
| 9 July 2015 | Alessandro Martinelli | Sampdoria | Brescia | Loan |
| 9 July 2015 | (Brazil) Sodinha | Brescia | Trapani | Undisclosed |
| 9 July 2015 | Iacopo Galli | Pontedera | Crotone | Undisclosed |
| 9 July 2015 | (Cameroon) Steve Leo Beleck | Fiorentina | (Romania) CFR Cluj | Loan |
| 9 July 2015 | Cristiano Piccini | Fiorentina | (Spain) Real Betis | Undisclosed |
| 9 July 2015 | Antonio Fiordilino | Palermo | Cosenza | Loan |
| 9 July 2015 | Gianluca Lapadula | Parma | Pescara | Free |
| 10 July 2015 | (France) Modibo Diakité | Cagliari | Frosinone | Free |
| 10 July 2015 | Salvatore Molina | Atalanta | Cesena | Loan |
| 10 July 2015 | (Ivory Coast) Moussa Koné | Atalanta | Cesena | Undisclosed |
| 10 July 2015 | Federico Varano | Atalanta | Cesena | Undisclosed |
| 10 July 2015 | Andrea Tozzo | Sampdoria | Novara | Loan |
| 10 July 2015 | (Croatia) Tomislav Gomelt | (England) Tottenham Hotspur | Bari | Undisclosed |
| 10 July 2015 | Gianluca Mancini | Fiorentina | Perugia | Loan |
| 10 July 2015 | (Ivory Coast) Guy Yao | Internazionale | Crotone | Loan |
| 10 July 2015 | Mirko Esposito | Parma | Crotone | Free |
| 10 July 2015 | Simone Corazza | Sampdoria | Novara | Undisclosed |
| 10 July 2015 | (Uruguay) Gastón Brugman | Pescara | Palermo | Loan |
| 10 July 2015 | Angelo Ogbonna | Juventus | (England) West Ham United | €11M |
| 10 July 2015 | Marco Pinato | Milan | Vicenza | Undisclosed |
| 10 July 2015 | Davide Gavazzi | Sampdoria | Avellino | Undisclosed |
| 10 July 2015 | Gabriele Rolando | Sampdoria | Matera | Loan |
| 10 July 2015 | Alex Redolfi | Atalanta | Pro Vercelli | Loan |
| 10 July 2015 | Mario Sampirisi | Genoa | Vicenza | Loan |
| 10 July 2015 | (Croatia) Antonio Lukanović | Parma | Novara | Free |
| 10 July 2015 | Leonardo Gatto | Atalanta | Vicenza | Loan |
| 10 July 2015 | Francesco Pacini | Poggibonsi | Novara | Undisclosed |
| 10 July 2015 | Marco Frediani | Roma | Ascoli | Loan |
| 10 July 2015 | (France) Jonathan Biabiany | Unattached | Internazionale | Free |
| 10 July 2015 | Gianni Manfrin | Chievo | Alessandria | 2-year loan |
| 10 July 2015 | Daniele Capelli | Atalanta | Cesena | Undisclosed |
| 10 July 2015 | Davide Zappacosta | Atalanta | Torino | Undisclosed |
| 10 July 2015 | Raffaele Di Gennaro | Internazionale | Latina | Loan |
| 10 July 2015 | Michele Somma | Roma | Brescia | Loan |
| 10 July 2015 | (Guinea-Bissau) Carlos Apna Embaló | Palermo | Brescia | Loan |
| 10 July 2015 | Luca Mazzitelli | Roma | Brescia | Loan |
| 10 July 2015 | Mattia Caldara | Atalanta | Cesena | Loan |
| 10 July 2015 | Alessandro Bacci | Empoli | Pisa | Undisclosed |
| 10 July 2015 | Ludovico Gargiulo | Empoli | Cremonese | Loan |
| 10 July 2015 | Matteo Brumat | Empoli | Arezzo | Loan |
| 10 July 2015 | Daniele Baselli | Atalanta | Torino | Undisclosed |
| 11 July 2015 | Giampaolo Pazzini | Milan | Verona | Free |
| 11 July 2015 | (Denmark) Frederik Sørensen | Juventus | (Germany) 1. FC Köln | Undisclosed |
| 11 July 2015 | Francesco Ingretolli | Pescara | Catanzaro | Loan |
| 11 July 2015 | (Poland) Tomasz Kupisz | Chievo | Brescia | Loan |
| 11 July 2015 | Marco Festa | Mantova | Crotone | Undisclosed |
| 11 July 2015 | Matteo Darmian | Torino | (England) Manchester United | Undisclosed |
| 11 July 2015 | Mattia Lombardo | Sampdoria | Pro Vercelli | Free |
| 12 July 2015 | Francesco Tavano | Empoli | Avellino | Undisclosed |
| 12 July 2015 | (Netherlands) Marten de Roon | (Netherlands) Heerenveen | Atalanta | Undisclosed |
| 12 July 2015 | Arturo Calabresi | Roma | Livorno | Loan |
| 12 July 2015 | (Belgium) Luis Pedro Cavanda | Lazio | (Turkey) Trabzonspor | Undisclosed |
| 12 July 2015 | Emanuele Rovini | Udinese | Pistoiese | Loan |
| 13 July 2015 | Stephan El Shaarawy | Milan | (France) Monaco | Loan |
| 13 July 2015 | Simone Colombi | Cagliari | Palermo | Loan |
| 13 July 2015 | Davide Di Gennaro | Palermo | Cagliari | Undisclosed |
| 13 July 2015 | Marco Chiosa | Torino | Avellino | Loan |
| 13 July 2015 | (Sweden) Oscar Hiljemark | (Netherlands) PSV Eindhoven | Palermo | Undisclosed |
| 13 July 2015 | Marco Calderoni | Chievo | Latina | Loan |
| 13 July 2015 | Aleandro Rosi | Genoa | Frosinone | Loan |
| 13 July 2015 | (France) Thomas Mangani | Chievo | (France) Angers | Undisclosed |
| 13 July 2015 | (Argentina) Guido Vadalá | (Argentina) Boca Juniors | Juventus | 2-year loan |
| 13 July 2015 | Filippo Costa | Chievo | (England) Bournemouth | Loan |
| 13 July 2015 | Nicola Leali | Juventus | Frosinone | Loan |
| 13 July 2015 | Matteo Contini | Atalanta | Bari | Loan |
| 13 July 2015 | Juri Cisotti | Spezia | HNK Rijeka | Loan |
| 13 July 2015 | (Democratic Republic of the Congo) Paul-Jose M'Poku | (Belgium) Standard Liège | Chievo | Loan |
| 13 July 2015 | (Belgium) Jean-François Gillet | Catania | Mechelen | Loan |
| 13 July 2015 | (Ghana) Isaac Donkor | Internazionale | Bari | Loan |
| 13 July 2015 | Daniele Corvia | Brescia | Latina | Free |
| 13 July 2015 | (Brazil) Bruno Uvini | Napoli | (Netherlands) Twente | Loan |
| 13 July 2015 | Gabriele Marchegiani | Roma | Pistoiese | Loan |
| 13 July 2015 | Massimo Sammartino | Roma | Pistoiese | Loan |
| 13 July 2015 | Roberto Colombo | Napoli | Cagliari | Free |
| 14 July 2015 | Matteo Scozzarella | Atalanta | Trapani | Undisclosed |
| 14 July 2015 | Alessandro Iacobucci | Parma | Virtus Entella | Free |
| 14 July 2015 | Matteo Ardemagni | Atalanta | Perugia | Loan |
| 14 July 2015 | (Cameroon) Allan Nyom | Udinese | (England) Watford | Undisclosed |
| 14 July 2015 | Piergiuseppe Maritato | Vicenza | Südtirol | Loan |
| 14 July 2015 | Fabio Pisacane | Avellino | Cagliari | Undisclosed |
| 14 July 2015 | Daniele Mignanelli | Reggiana | Pescara | Undisclosed |
| 14 July 2015 | Michele Pazienza | Bologna | Vicenza | Free |
| 14 July 2015 | (Uruguay) Rubén Bentancourt | Atalanta | Arezzo | Loan |
| 14 July 2015 | Antonino Ragusa | Genoa | Cesena | Undisclosed |
| 14 July 2015 | Vittorio Parigini | Torino | Perugia | Loan |
| 14 July 2015 | Umberto Eusepi | Benevento | Salernitana | Undisclosed |
| 14 July 2015 | Luca Milesi | Atalanta | Arezzo | Loan |
| 14 July 2015 | (Slovenia) Luka Krajnc | Genoa | Cagliari | Undisclosed |
| 14 July 2015 | Alessandro Mastalli | Milan | (Switzerland) Lugano | Loan |
| 15 July 2015 | Matteo Lomolino | Internazionale | Savona | Loan |
| 15 July 2015 | (Slovenia) Jan Koprivec | Perugia | (Cyprus) Anorthosis | Undisclosed |
| 15 July 2015 | (Albania) Rey Manaj | Cremonese | Internazionale | Undisclosed |
| 15 July 2015 | Marco Soprano | Genoa | Cosenza | Loan |
| 15 July 2015 | (Brazil) Ângelo | Latina | Foggia | Undisclosed |
| 15 July 2015 | Fabrizio Roberti | Trastevere | Latina | Undisclosed |
| 15 July 2015 | Simone Sini | Roma | Virtus Entella | Undisclosed |
| 15 July 2015 | (Portugal) Bruno Pereirinha | Lazio | (Brazil) Atlético Paranaense | Free |
| 15 July 2015 | (Ghana) Amidu Salifu | Fiorentina | Perugia | Loan |
| 15 July 2015 | Roberto Insigne | Napoli | Avellino | Loan |
| 15 July 2015 | Leonardo Citti | Juventus | Pontedera | Loan |
| 15 July 2015 | Nicolò Curti | Juventus | Pontedera | Loan |
| 15 July 2015 | Daniele Martinelli | Trapani | Bassano | Loan |
| 15 July 2015 | (Ivory Coast) Tallo Gadji | Roma | (France) Lille | Undisclosed |
| 15 July 2015 | Luigi Sepe | Napoli | Fiorentina | Loan |
| 15 July 2015 | (Brazil) Gabriel | Milan | Napoli | Loan |
| 15 July 2015 | Giacomo Risaliti | Empoli | Pontedera | Loan |
| 15 July 2015 | Gianluca Sansone | Sampdoria | Bari | Loan |
| 15 July 2015 | (Switzerland) Karim Rossi | (Belgium) Zulte Waregem | Spezia | Free |
| 15 July 2015 | Matteo Paro | Mantova | Crotone | Undisclosed |
| 15 July 2015 | Marco Supino | Napoli | Pontedera | Loan |
| 15 July 2015 | Lorenzo Bardini | Fiorentina | Prato | Loan |
| 15 July 2015 | (Brazil) Nícolas Andrade | Verona | Trapani | Loan |
| 15 July 2015 | Gennaro Tutino | Napoli | Avellino | Loan |
| 15 July 2015 | Giuliano Regolanti | Frosinone | Matera | Loan |
| 16 July 2015 | Antonio Rosati | Fiorentina | Perugia | Undisclosed |
| 16 July 2015 | Andrea Russotto | Catanzaro | Salernitana | Undisclosed |
| 16 July 2015 | Lorenzo Crisetig | Internazionale | Bologna | 2-year loan |
| 16 July 2015 | (Croatia) Marijan Ćorić | Parma | Spezia | Free |
| 16 July 2015 | (Guinea) Ismaël Karba Bangoura | Cesena | Fidelis Andria | Loan |
| 16 July 2015 | Nicola Capellini | Cesena | Fidelis Andria | Undisclosed |
| 16 July 2015 | Alfredo Donnarumma | Pescara | Teramo | Undisclosed |
| 16 July 2015 | (Georgia (country)) Irakli Shekiladze | Latina | Tuttocuoio | Undisclosed |
| 16 July 2015 | Giuseppe De Luca | Atalanta | Bari | Loan |
| 16 July 2015 | David Speziale | Verona | Pistoiese | Loan |
| 16 July 2015 | Federico Proia | Torino | Pistoiese | Loan |
| 16 July 2015 | (Slovenia) Dejan Lazarević | Chievo | (Turkey) Antalyaspor | Undisclosed |
| 16 July 2015 | Armando Anastasio | Napoli | Padova | Loan |
| 16 July 2015 | (Croatia) Duje Čop | Cagliari | (Spain) Málaga | Loan |
| 16 July 2015 | Gregorio Luperini | Juventus | Pro Vercelli | Loan |
| 16 July 2015 | Andrea Marconi | Pro Vercelli | Como | Undisclosed |
| 17 July 2015 | (Switzerland) Jonathan Rossini | Sassuolo | Savona | Loan |
| 17 July 2015 | Marco Piredda | Cagliari | Siena | Loan |
| 17 July 2015 | (Spain) Mamadou Tounkara | Lazio | Crotone | Loan |
| 17 July 2015 | Luca Bittante | Fiorentina | Empoli | Undisclosed |
| 17 July 2015 | (Brazil) Naldo | Udinese | (Portugal) Sporting CP | Undisclosed |
| 17 July 2015 | Mattia Muroni | Cagliari | Tuttocuoio | Loan |
| 17 July 2015 | Werther Carboni | Cagliari | Tuttocuoio | Loan |
| 17 July 2015 | (Paraguay) Iván Piris | (Uruguay) Deportivo Maldonado | Udinese | Undisclosed |
| 17 July 2015 | (Togo) Serge Gakpé | (France) Nantes | Genoa | Free |
| 17 July 2015 | (Brazil) Nenê | Verona | Latina | Loan |
| 17 July 2015 | Ferdinando Coppola | Bologna | Verona | Free |
| 17 July 2015 | (Ghana) Alimeyaw Salifu | Verona | Latina | Loan |
| 17 July 2015 | (Argentina) Gonzalo Escalante | Catania | (Spain) Eibar | Loan |
| 17 July 2015 | (Argentina) Fabián Rinaudo | Catania | (Argentina) Gimnasia | Loan |
| 17 July 2015 | (Spain) José Campaña | Sampdoria | (Spain) Alcorcón | Loan |
| 17 July 2015 | Lorenzo Venuti | Fiorentina | Brescia | Loan |
| 17 July 2015 | (Bulgaria) Radoslav Kirilov | Chievo | Südtirol | Loan |
| 17 July 2015 | Andrea Russotto | Catanzaro | Salernitana | Undisclosed |
| 17 July 2015 | (Serbia) Željko Brkić | Udinese | Carpi | Loan |
| 17 July 2015 | Daniele Giorico | Venezia | Modena | Undisclosed |
| 17 July 2015 | Fabrizio Cacciatore | Sampdoria | Chievo | Loan |
| 17 July 2015 | (Bosnia and Herzegovina) Ervin Zukanović | Chievo | Sampdoria | Loan |
| 17 July 2015 | Simone Emmanuello | Atalanta | Pro Vercelli | Loan |
| 20 July 2015 | Andrea Lazzari | Fiorentina | Carpi | Free |
| 18 July 2015 | Albero Rizzo | Trapani | Bologna | Loan |
| 18 July 2015 | (Sweden) Albin Ekdal | Cagliari | (Germany) Hamburger sv | Undisclosed |
| 18 July 2015 | (Bulgaria) Pavel Vidanov | Trapani | Unattached | Released |
| 18 July 2015 | (Serbia) Darko Lazović | (Serbia) Red Star Belgrade | Genoa | Free |
| 18 July 2015 | Francesco Todisco | Genoa | Rimini | Loan |
| 18 July 2015 | Matteo Fissore | Torino | Fidelis Andria | Loan |
| 18 July 2015 | (Serbia) Boris Radunović | (Serbia) FK Rad | Atalanta | Undisclosed |
| 18 July 2015 | Riccardo Improta | Genoa | Cesena | Loan |
| 18 July 2015 | (Switzerland) Daniel Pavlović | (Switzerland) Grasshopper | Frosinone | Loan |
| 18 July 2015 | Mario Gargiulo | Chievo | Bassano | Loan |
| 18 July 2015 | (Uruguay) Salvador Ichazo | (Uruguay) Danubio | Torino | Undisclosed |
| 18 July 2015 | (Argentina) Ezequiel Muñoz | Palermo | Genoa | Free |
| 18 July 2015 | Andrea Schiavone | Juventus | Livorno | Loan |
| 19 July 2015 | Davide Toso | Internazionale | Bassano | Loan |
| 19 July 2015 | Davide Costa | Internazionale | Bassano | Loan |
| 19 July 2015 | (Albania) Samir Ujkani | Palermo | Genoa | Free |
| 20 July 2015 | Matteo Brighi | Sassuolo | Bologna | Free |
| 20 July 2015 | Matteo Paccagnini | Spezia | Pisa | Loan |
| 20 July 2015 | Ernesto Starita | Pro Vercelli | Pisa | Loan |
| 20 July 2015 | Simone Bastoni | Spezia | Siena | Loan |
| 20 July 2015 | Andrea Lazzari | Fiorentina | Carpi | Free |
| 20 July 2015 | (Montenegro) Stefan Savić | Fiorentina | (Spain) Atlético Madrid | Undisclosed |
| 20 July 2015 | Jacopo Ferri | Roma | S.P.A.L. | Loan |
| 20 July 2015 | Gianmarco Vannucchi | Juventus | Alessandria | Undisclosed |
| 20 July 2015 | Luca Parodi | Torino | Ancona | Loan |
| 20 July 2015 | Andrea Fulignati | Palermo | Trapani | Loan |
| 20 July 2015 | Antonio Matera | Entella | Fidelis Andria | Free |
| 20 July 2015 | (Czech Republic) Michael Rabušic | Verona | (Czech Republic) Slovan Liberec | Loan |
| 20 July 2015 | Tommaso D'Orazio | Ancona | Teramo | Undisclosed |
| 20 July 2015 | Victor De Lucia | Frosinone | Latina | Undisclosed |
| 20 July 2015 | (Romania) Constantin Nica | Atalanta | Avellino | Loan |
| 20 July 2015 | Pietro Iemmello | Spezia | Lanciano | Loan |
| 20 July 2015 | Stefano D'Agostino | Fondi | Teramo | Undisclosed |
| 20 July 2015 | (France) Issa Cissokho | (France) Nantes | Genoa | Undisclosed |
| 20 July 2015 | (Greece) Anastasios Donis | Juventus | (Switzerland) Lugano | Loan |
| 21 July 2015 | (Czech Republic) Lukáš Zima | Genoa | Perugia | Loan |
| 21 July 2015 | (Ghana) Abass Alhassan | Sassuolo | Fidelis Andria | Loan |
| 21 July 2015 | Kevin Bonifazi | Torino | Benevento | Loan |
| 21 July 2015 | (Brazil) Cláudio Winck | (Brazil) Internacional | Verona | Loan |
| 21 July 2015 | Andrea Boron | Carpi | Siena | Loan |
| 21 July 2015 | Alberto Torelli | Carpi | Siena | Loan |
| 21 July 2015 | Richard Gabriel Marcone | Trapani | Vicenza | Loan |
| 21 July 2015 | (Spain) Sergio Postigo | (Spain) Leganés | Spezia | Free |
| 21 July 2015 | (England) Myles Anderson | Chievo | L'Aquila | Undisclosed |
| 21 July 2015 | Eric Lanini | Juventus | Lanciano | Loan |
| 21 July 2015 | Stefano Padovan | Juventus | Lanciano | Loan |
| 21 July 2015 | (Romania) Alexandru Mitriță | (Romania) Viitorul Constanța | Pescara | Undisclosed |
| 21 July 2015 | Francesco Fedato | Sampdoria | Livorno | Loan |
| 22 July 2015 | (Nigeria) Nnamdi Oduamadi | Milan | (Turkey) Şanlıurfaspor | Loan |
| 22 July 2015 | (Brazil) Ederson | Lazio | (Brazil) Flamengo | Free |
| 22 July 2015 | (Brazil) Wallace | (England) Chelsea | Carpi | Loan |
| 22 July 2015 | Nicolò Sperotto | Carpi | Arezzo | Loan |
| 22 July 2015 | Leonardo Spinazzola | Juventus | Perugia | Loan |
| 22 July 2015 | Riccardo Ferrara | Trapani | Lucchese | Loan |
| 22 July 2015 | Ernesto Torregrossa | Verona | Trapani | Loan |
| 22 July 2015 | (Chile) Manuel Iturra | (Spain) Granada | Udinese | Undisclosed |
| 22 July 2015 | (Croatia) Damjan Đoković | Bologna | (France) Gazélec Ajaccio | Free |
| 22 July 2015 | (Brazil) Gilberto | (Brazil) Botafogo | Fiorentina | Undisclosed |
| 22 July 2015 | (Montenegro) Filip Raičević | Lucchese | Vicenza | Undisclosed |
| 22 July 2015 | (Sweden) Filip Helander | (Sweden) Malmö FF | Verona | Undisclosed |
| 22 July 2015 | (Bulgaria) Antonio Vutov | Udinese | Cosenza | Loan |
| 22 July 2015 | (Spain) Mario Suárez | (Spain) Atlético Madrid | Fiorentina | Undisclosed |
| 22 July 2015 | Davide Lodesani | Sassuolo | Foggia | Undisclosed |
| 22 July 2015 | Francesco Joyce Anacoura | Juventus | Rimini | Loan |
| 22 July 2015 | Nicolò Gigli | Fiorentina | Lecce | Loan |
| 22 July 2015 | Michael Ventre | Genoa | Cosenza | Loan |
| 22 July 2015 | (Brazil) Allan | (Spain) Granada | Napoli | Undisclosed |
| 22 July 2015 | (Colombia) Duván Zapata | Napoli | Udinese | 2-year loan |
| 22 July 2015 | (Uruguay) Miguel Britos | Napoli | (England) Watford | Undisclosed |
| 22 July 2015 | (Nigeria) Nnamdi Oduamadi | Milan | (Turkey) Şanlıurfaspor | Undisclosed |
| 23 July 2015 | Gennaro Scognamiglio | Benenvento | Trapani | Undisclosed |
| 23 July 2015 | (Senegal) Ansoumana Sané | Chievo | Pontedera | Loan |
| 23 July 2015 | Giuseppe Rizzo | Reggina | Perugia | Undisclosed |
| 23 July 2015 | (Slovenia) Rene Krhin | Internazionale | (Spain) Granada | Undisclosed |
| 23 July 2015 | Ivan Provedel | Chievo | Modena | Loan |
| 23 July 2015 | Lorenzo Marchionni | Chievo | Modena | Loan |
| 23 July 2015 | Niccolò Giannetti | Spezia | Cagliari | Undisclosed |
| 23 July 2015 | Walter Bressan | Cesena | Chievo | Free |
| 23 July 2015 | (Romania) Deian Boldor | Roma | Lanciano | Free |
| 23 July 2015 | (Argentina) Diego Peralta | Fiorentina | Pisa | Loan |
| 23 July 2015 | (Croatia) Igor Bubnjić | Udinese | Carpi | Loan |
| 23 July 2015 | Francesco Zampano | Verona | Pescara | Undisclosed |
| 23 July 2015 | (Ghana) Alfred Duncan | Sampdoria | Sassuolo | Loan |
| 23 July 2015 | Pierluigi Cappelluzzo | Verona | Pescara | Loan |
| 23 July 2015 | Vincenzo Fiorillo | Juventus | Pescara | Loan |
| 23 July 2015 | Mattia Valoti | Verona | Pescara | Loan |
| 23 July 2015 | Rolando Mandragora | Genoa | Pescara | Loan |
| 23 July 2015 | Gaetano Monachello | (France) Monaco | Atalanta | Undisclosed |
| 24 July 2015 | Stefano Pettinari | Roma | Vicenza | Loan |
| 24 July 2015 | (Argentina) Nicolás Spolli | Catania | Carpi | Free |
| 24 July 2015 | (Hungary) David Forgács | Atalanta | Pisa | Loan |
| 24 July 2015 | Franco Brienza | Cesena | Bologna | Free |
| 24 July 2015 | Andrea Demontis | Cagliari | Melfi | Loan |
| 24 July 2015 | Giuseppe Ruggiero | Pro Vercelli | Cuneo | Loan |
| 24 July 2015 | Alessandro Masia | Cagliari | Melfi | Loan |
| 24 July 2015 | Michele Camporese | Fiorentina | Empoli | Undisclosed |
| 24 July 2015 | (Brazil) Victor da Silva | Chievo | Teramo | Loan |
| 24 July 2015 | Gianluca Barba | Pescara | Pro Piacenza | Loan |
| 25 July 2015 | Francesco Bardi | Internazionale | (Spain) Espanyol | Loan |
| 25 July 2015 | Roberto Maurantonio | Carpi | Akragas | Free |
| 26 July 2015 | (Senegal) Mame Baba Thiam | Juventus | (Belgium) Zulte Waregem | Loan |
| 27 July 2015 | (Argentina) Sergio Romero | Sampdoria | (England) Manchester United | Free |
| 27 July 2015 | Nicola Belmonte | Catania | Perugia | Undisclosed |
| 27 July 2015 | Fabio Gavazzi | Novara | Mantova | Loan |
| 27 July 2015 | Andrea Mantovani | Perugia | Vicenza | Free |
| 27 July 2015 | Mirko Eramo | Sampdoria | Trapani | Loan |
| 27 July 2015 | Andrea Zanchi | Perugia | Matera | Undisclosed |
| 27 July 2015 | Nadir Minotti | Atalanta | Como | Loan |
| 27 July 2015 | (Spain) Pol García | Juventus | Como | Loan |
| 27 July 2015 | Mario Mercadante | Bari | Ischia | Undisclosed |
| 28 July 2015 | (Morocco) Abdelhamid El Kaoutari | (France) Montpellier | Palermo | Undisclosed |
| 28 July 2015 | Stefano Okaka | Sampdoria | (Belgium) Anderlecht | Undisclosed |
| 28 July 2015 | (Chile) Arturo Vidal | Juventus | (Germany) Bayern Munich | €37M |
| 28 July 2015 | (Ghana) Nii Nortey Ashong | Latina | Lucchese | Free |
| 28 July 2015 | Doudou Mangni | Atalanta | (Turkey) Şanlıurfaspor | Undisclosed |
| 28 July 2015 | (Brazil) Raphael Martinho | Catania | Carpi | Free |
| 28 July 2015 | (Poland) Igor Łasicki | Napoli | Maceratese | Loan |
| 28 July 2015 | (Ukraine) Nikita Contini Baranovsky | Napoli | S.P.A.L. | Loan |
| 29 July 2015 | (Netherlands) Ricardo Kishna | (Netherlands) Ajax | Lazio | Undisclosed |
| 29 July 2015 | (Poland) Wojciech Szczęsny | (England) Arsenal | Roma | Loan |
| 29 July 2015 | Roberto Gagliardini | Atalanta | Vicenza | Loan |
| 29 July 2015 | (Croatia) Josip Brezovec | (Croatia) HNK Rijeka | Spezia | Loan |
| 29 July 2015 | Gianni Munari | Parma | Cagliari | Free |
| 29 July 2015 | Lorenzo Benucci | Juventus | Prato | Loan |
| 29 July 2015 | (Croatia) Zoran Kvržić | (Croatia) HNK Rijeka | Spezia | Loan |
| 30 July 2015 | (Switzerland) Matteo Fedele | (Switzerland) Sion | Carpi | Loan |
| 30 July 2015 | (Brazil) Gabriel Silva | Udinese | Carpi | Loan |
| 30 July 2015 | Elio Calderini | Cosenza | Catania | Undisclosed |
| 30 July 2015 | (Germany) Mario Gómez | Fiorentina | (Turkey) Beşiktaş | Loan |
| 30 July 2015 | (Lithuania) Tomas Švedkauskas | Roma | Ascoli | Loan |
| 30 July 2015 | Andrea Doninelli | Benevento | Modena | Undisclosed |
| 30 July 2015 | Alfred Gomis | Torino | Cesena | Loan |
| 30 July 2015 | (Romania) Vlad Chiricheș | (England) Tottenham Hotspur | Napoli | Undisclosed |
| 30 July 2015 | Michelangelo Albertazzi | Milan | Verona | Undisclosed |
| 30 July 2015 | Guido Gómez | Sassuolo | Juve Stabia | Undisclosed |
| 31 July 2015 | (Angola) Cephas Malele | Palermo | (Portugal) Atlético CP | Loan |
| 31 July 2015 | Nicolò Scalini | Bologna | Torres | Loan |
| 31 July 2015 | (Serbia) Uroš Radaković | Bologna | (Czech Republic) Sigma Olomouc | Loan |
| 31 July 2015 | (France) Olivier Jules Ntcham | (England) Manchester City | Genoa | 2-year loan |
| 31 July 2015 | (Montenegro) Stevan Jovetić | (England) Manchester City | Internazionale | 18-month loan |
| 31 July 2015 | Riccardo Melgrati | Cesena | Pro Vercelli | Loan |
| 31 July 2015 | (Ghana) Masahudu Alhassan | Udinese | Perugia | Undisclosed |
| 31 July 2015 | Giacomo Beretta | Milan | Pro Vercelli | Loan |
| 31 July 2015 | Dario Giacomarro | Palermo | Melfi | Loan |
| 31 July 2015 | (Croatia) Ivan Martić | Verona | Spezia | Undisclosed |
| 31 July 2015 | Luca Belingheri | Livorno | Modena | Free |
| 1 August 2015 | Gianluca Nicco | Perugia | Alessandria | Undisclosed |
| 1 August 2015 | William Jidayi | Juve Stabia | Avellino | Undisclosed |
| 1 August 2015 | Lorenzo Del Prete | Catania | Perugia | Undisclosed |
| 1 August 2015 | Simone Calvano | Verona | Teramo | Loan |
| 1 August 2015 | Antonio Bocchetti | Paganese | Salernitana | Undisclosed |
| 2 August 2015 | Nicolas Viola | Palermo | Novara | Free |
| 3 August 2015 | (France) Yohan Benalouane | Atalanta | (England) Leicester City | Undisclosed |
| 3 August 2015 | Lorenzo Ferrari | Verona | Rimini | Loan |
| 3 August 2015 | (Denmark) Magnus Troest | Lanciano | Novara | Free |
| 3 August 2015 | Emanuele Calaiò | Catania | Spezia | Undisclosed |
| 3 August 2015 | Antonio Rozzi | Lazio | Lanciano | Loan |
| 3 August 2015 | Luca Crecco | Lazio | Lanciano | Loan |
| 3 August 2015 | Gennaro Troianiello | Palermo | Salernitana | Free |
| 3 August 2015 | (Albania) Elseid Hysaj | Empoli | Napoli | Undisclosed |
| 3 August 2015 | (Serbia) Sergej Milinković-Savić | (Belgium) Genk | Lazio | Undisclosed |
| 3 August 2015 | Carlo Pinsoglio | Juventus | Livorno | Loan |
| 4 August 2015 | Claudio Terzi | Palermo | Spezia | Undisclosed |
| 4 August 2015 | Andrea Barberis | Varese | Crotone | Free |
| 4 August 2015 | Claudio Morra | Torino | Fidelis Andria | Loan |
| 4 August 2015 | (Croatia) Mario Šitum | (Croatia) Dinamo Zagreb | Spezia | Loan |
| 4 August 2015 | (Croatia) Dario Čanađija | (Croatia) HNK Rijeka | Spezia | Loan |
| 4 August 2015 | (Romania) George Pușcaș | Internazionale | Bari | Loan |
| 4 August 2015 | (Guinea) Gaston Camara | Internazionale | Bari | Loan |
| 4 August 2015 | Silvano Raggio Garibaldi | Entella | Mantova | Undisclosed |
| 4 August 2015 | Paolo Valagussa | Entella | Renate | Loan |
| 4 August 2015 | Davide Astori | Cagliari | Fiorentina | Loan |
| 4 August 2015 | (France) Alexandre Coeff | Udinese | (France) Gazélec Ajaccio | Undisclosed |
| 4 August 2015 | Alessio Sestu | Chievo | Virtus Entella | Loan |
| 4 August 2015 | (Romania) Sergiu Suciu | Torino | Lecce | Loan |
| 4 August 2015 | Samuele Longo | Internazionale | Frosinone | Loan |
| 4 August 2015 | (Slovakia) Tomáš Vestenický | Roma | Modena | Loan |
| 5 August 2015 | (Uruguay) Nicolás López | Udinese | (Spain) Granada | Loan |
| 5 August 2015 | Fabio Formato | Frosinone | Prato | Loan |
| 5 August 2015 | Matteo Pisseri | Parma | Ternana | Free |
| 5 August 2015 | Federico Furlan | Bassano | Ternana | Free |
| 5 August 2015 | (Netherlands) Jens Janse | Unattached | Ternana | Free |
| 5 August 2015 | (France) Gregoire Defrel | Cesena | Sassuolo | Undisclosed |
| 5 August 2015 | (Bosnia and Herzegovina) Andrej Modić | Milan | Vicenza | Loan |
| 6 August 2015 | (Hungary) Krisztián Tamás | Milan | Spezia | Undisclosed |
| 6 August 2015 | (Croatia) Mato Miloš | (Croatia) HNK Rijeka | Spezia | Loan |
| 6 August 2015 | (Egypt) Mohamed Salah | (England) Chelsea | Roma | Loan |
| 6 August 2015 | (Uruguay) Mathías Abero | Bologna | (Uruguay) Nacional | Undisclosed |
| 6 August 2015 | Filippo Boni | Verona | Prato | Loan |
| 6 August 2015 | Simone Scuffet | Udinese | Como | Loan |
| 6 August 2015 | Daniel Bessa | Internazionale | Como | Loan |
| 6 August 2015 | Simone Rosso | Torino | Brescia | Loan |
| 6 August 2015 | Alexis Zapata | Udinese | Perugia | Loan |
| 6 August 2015 | Luca Liverani | Barletta | Salernitana | Free |
| 6 August 2015 | Raffaele Schiavi | Catania | Salernitana | Undisclosed |
| 6 August 2015 | Daniele Sciaudone | Catania | Salernitana | Undisclosed |
| 6 August 2015 | Caleb Ekuban | Chievo | Renate | Loan |
| 6 August 2015 | (France) Kevin Yamga | Chievo | Siena | Loan |
| 6 August 2015 | Francesco Cosenza | Pro Vercelli | Lecce | Free |
| 7 August 2015 | Giovanni Graziano | Torino | Renate | Loan |
| 7 August 2015 | (Chile) Erick Pulgar | (Chile) Universidad Católica | Bologna | Undisclosed |
| 7 August 2015 | (France) Prince-Désir Gouano | Atalanta | (England) Bolton Wanderers | Loan |
| 7 August 2015 | (Greece) Antonis Petropoulos | (Greece) Kalloni | Bari | Undisclosed |
| 7 August 2015 | Alessandro De Vitis | Sampdoria | S.P.A.L. | Loan |
| 8 August 2015 | (Brazil) Zé Eduardo | Cesena | Virtus Lanciano | Loan |
| 8 August 2015 | Antonio Palma | Atalanta | Juve Stabia | Loan |
| 8 August 2015 | (Portugal) Aladje | Sassuolo | Prato | Loan |
| 8 August 2015 | Luca Bruno | Brescia | Crotone | Undisclosed |
| 8 August 2015 | Francesco Forte | Carpi | Maceratese | Undisclosed |
| 8 August 2015 | Marco Baldan | Perugia | Lumezzane | Loan |
| 8 August 2015 | Raffaele Esposito | Salernitana | Paganese | Loan |
| 8 August 2015 | (Montenegro) Marko Vešović | Torino | Spezia | Loan |
| 8 August 2015 | (Montenegro) Marko Vešović | Spezia | (Croatia) HNK Rijeka | Loan |
| 9 August 2015 | Antonio Cassano | Unattached | Sampdoria | Free |
| 9 August 2015 | Salvatore Aloi | Trapani | Akragas | Loan |
| 9 August 2015 | Alessio Lo Porto | Perugia | Ternana | Free |
| 9 August 2015 | (Albania) Hysen Memolla | Verona | (Slovenia) Koper | Loan |
| 10 August 2015 | (Ivory Coast) Seydou Doumbia | Roma | (Russia) CSKA Moscow | 6-month loan |
| 10 August 2015 | Matteo Pessina | Milan | Lecce | Loan |
| 10 August 2015 | Gianluigi Salvato | Trapani | Fano | Loan |
| 10 August 2015 | Pierantonio Sassano | Trapani | Ancona | Undisclosed |
| 10 August 2015 | (Croatia) Frano Mlinar | Udinese | (Croatia) Inter Zaprešić | Loan |
| 10 August 2015 | Raffaele Maiello | Napoli | Empoli | 2-year loan |
| 10 August 2015 | Gianmarco Gerevini | Bologna | (Portugal) Atlético CP | Loan |
| 10 August 2015 | (Argentina) Julián Velázquez | Palermo | (Croatia) Hajduk Split | Undisclosed |
| 10 August 2015 | Camillo Ciano | Crotone | Cesena | Undisclosed |
| 11 August 2015 | Alessio Romagnoli | Roma | Milan | €25M |
| 11 August 2015 | (Paraguay) Antonio Sanabria | Roma | (Spain) Sporting Gijón | Loan |
| 11 August 2015 | Marco Vittiglio | Entella | Fidelis Andria | Undisclosed |
| 11 August 2015 | (Switzerland) Xherdan Shaqiri | Internazionale | (England) Stoke City | £12M |
| 11 August 2015 | Simone Pepe | Juventus | Chievo | Free |
| 11 August 2015 | Raffaele Maiello | Crotone | Napoli | Undisclosed |
| 12 August 2015 | (Romania) Ștefan Popescu | Cagliari | Modena | Undisclosed |
| 12 August 2015 | (Brazil) Vinícius Freitas | Lazio | (Switzerland) Zürich | Loan |
| 12 August 2015 | (Bulgaria) Andrey Galabinov | Livorno | Novara | Free |
| 12 August 2015 | Antonio Loi | Cagliari | Reggiana | Loan |
| 12 August 2015 | (Croatia) Simon Sluga | (Croatia) HNK Rijeka | Spezia | Loan |
| 12 August 2015 | Osarimen Ebagua | Spezia | Como | Undisclosed |
| 12 August 2015 | Nicola Madonna | Spezia | Como | Loan |
| 12 August 2015 | (Paraguay) Antonio Sanabria | Roma | (Spain) Sporting de Gijón | Loan |
| 12 August 2015 | (Bosnia and Herzegovina) Edin Džeko | (England) Manchester City | Roma | Loan |
| 12 August 2015 | Enrico Zampa | Lazio | Ternana | Undisclosed |
| 12 August 2015 | Ettore Mendicino | Lazio | Siena | Undisclosed |
| 12 August 2015 | Valerio Nava | Atalanta | Ascoli | Loan |
| 12 August 2015 | (Slovakia) Jakub Hromada | Sampdoria | (Slovakia) Senica | 2-year loan |
| 12 August 2015 | (Slovakia) Michal Tomič | (Slovakia) Senica | Sampdoria | 2-year loan |
| 12 August 2015 | Elia Legati | Unattached | Pro Vercelli | Free |
| 12 August 2015 | Valerio Di Cesare | Brescia | Bari | Undisclosed |
| 13 August 2015 | Massimiliano Busellato | Cittadella | Ternana | Loan |
| 13 August 2015 | (Colombia) Brayan Perea | Lazio | (France) Troyes | Loan |
| 13 August 2015 | Marco Zambelli | Brescia | Empoli | Free |
| 13 August 2015 | Niccolò Belloni | Internazionale | Ternana | Loan |
| 13 August 2015 | Federico Moretti | Catania | Latina | Undisclosed |
| 14 August 2015 | (Brazil) Igor Coronado | (Malta) Floriana | Trapani | Loan |
| 14 August 2015 | Davide Monteleone | Palermo | Ternana | Loan |
| 14 August 2015 | (France) Granddi Ngoyi | Palermo | (France) Dijon | Loan |
| 14 August 2015 | (Austria) György Garics | Bologna | (Germany) Darmstadt 98 | Free |
| 14 August 2015 | Francesco Lo Bue | Trapani | Lecce | Undisclosed |
| 14 August 2015 | (Croatia) Nikola Kalinić | (Ukraine) Dnipro Dnipropetrovsk | Fiorentina | Undisclosed |
| 15 August 2015 | (France) Mapou Yanga-Mbiwa | Roma | (France) Lyon | €8M |
| 15 August 2015 | (Senegal) Mbaye Diagne | Juventus | (Hungary) Újpest | Loan |
| 16 August 2015 | Simone Verdi | Milan | (Spain) Eibar | Loan |
| 16 August 2015 | (Croatia) Robert Kristo | Spezia | Fidelis Andria | Loan |
| 17 August 2015 | (Brazil) Caio Rangel | Cagliari | (Portugal) Arouca | 2-year loan |
| 17 August 2015 | Luca Mazzoni | Livorno | Ternana | Free |
| 17 August 2015 | (Argentina) Juan Alberto Mauri | Milan | Akragas | Loan |
| 18 August 2015 | Leonardo Capezzi | Fiorentina | Crotone | Loan |
| 18 August 2015 | Paolo Castellini | Unattached | Brescia | Free |
| 18 August 2015 | (Croatia) Mateo Kovačić | Internazionale | (Spain) Real Madrid | Undisclosed |
| 18 August 2015 | Andrea Belotti | Palermo | Torino | Undisclosed |
| 18 August 2015 | (Serbia) Uroš Đurđević | (Netherlands) Vitesse Arnhem | Palermo | Free |
| 18 August 2015 | Filippo Falco | Lecce | Bologna | Loan |
| 18 August 2015 | (Spain) Diego Capel | (Portugal) Sporting CP | Genoa | Undisclosed |
| 18 August 2015 | (Brazil) Marquinho | Roma | Udinese | Undisclosed |
| 18 August 2015 | Pasquale Schiattarella | Spezia | Latina | Undisclosed |
| 18 August 2015 | (Uruguay) Alejandro González | Verona | Ternana | Loan |
| 19 August 2015 | (Switzerland) Gökhan Inler | Napoli | (England) Leicester City | Undisclosed |
| 19 August 2015 | (Argentina) Gaspar Iñíguez | (Spain) Granada | Carpi | Loan |
| 19 August 2015 | Pasquale De Vita | Verona | Trapani | Undisclosed |
| 19 August 2015 | (Albania) Armando Vajushi | Chievo | Livorno | Loan |
| 19 August 2015 | (Croatia) Josip Mišić | (Croatia) HNK Rijeka | Spezia | Loan |
| 19 August 2015 | (Brazil) Edimar Fraga | Chievo | (Portugal) Rio Ave | Loan |
| 19 August 2015 | (Germany) Antonio Rüdiger | (Germany) VfB Stuttgart | Roma | Loan |
| 19 August 2015 | (Norway) Vajebah Sakor | Juventus | (Belgium) Westerlo | 2-year loan |
| 20 August 2015 | (Slovakia) Norbert Gyömbér | Catania | Roma | Loan |
| 20 August 2015 | Mattia Destro | Roma | Bologna | €6,5M |
| 20 August 2015 | (Brazil) Alex Sandro | (Portugal) Porto | Juventus | €26M |
| 21 August 2015 | Alberto Cerri | Juventus | Cagliari | Loan |
| 21 August 2015 | (Ghana) Isaac Ntow | Chievo | Como | Loan |
| 24 August 2015 | (Chile) Eduardo Vargas | Napoli | (Germany) TSG 1899 Hoffenheim | Undisclosed |
| 24 August 2015 | Alessio Sabbione | Carpi | Crotone | Loan |
| 24 August 2015 | (Uruguay) Jaime Báez | (Uruguay) Juventud | Fiorentina | Undisclosed |
| 24 August 2015 | Axel Gulin | Fiorentina | Pordenone | Loan |
| 24 August 2015 | Marco Berardi | Fiorentina | Pordenone | Loan |
| 24 August 2015 | (Ivory Coast) Diomandè Gondo | Fiorentina | Ternana | Loan |
| 25 August 2015 | (Colombia) Juan Cuadrado | (England) Chelsea | Juventus | Loan |
| 25 August 2015 | (Romania) Adrian Stoian | Chievo | Crotone | Free |
| 25 August 2015 | Pietro Menegatti | S.P.A.L. | Cesena | Undisclosed |
| 25 August 2015 | Nicolao Dumitru | Napoli | Latina | Loan |
| 25 August 2015 | Matteo Grandi | Cesena | Catanzaro | Loan |
| 25 August 2015 | Paolo Grossi | Verona | Ternana | Free |
| 25 August 2015 | (Albania) Simon Laner | Verona | (Switzerland) Chiasso | Loan |
| 25 August 2015 | (Ghana) Godfred Donsah | Cagliari | Bologna | Loan |
| 25 August 2015 | (Albania) Charalampos Kiakis | Verona | (Albania) Partizan Tirana | Loan |
| 25 August 2015 | (Colombia) Jherson Vergara | Milan | Livorno | Loan |
| 26 August 2015 | (France) Lucas Digne | (France) Paris Saint-Germain | Roma | Loan |
| 26 August 2015 | (Morocco) Younes Bnou Marzouk | Juventus | (Belgium) Westerlo | Loan |
| 26 August 2015 | Nicolò Fazzi | Fiorentina | Virtus Entella | Loan |
| 26 August 2015 | Luca Zanon | Fiorentina | Virtus Entella | Loan |
| 26 August 2015 | Simone Pasa | Internazionale | Pordenone | Loan |
| 26 August 2015 | (Ivory Coast) Franck Kessié | Atalanta | Cesena | Loan |
| 26 August 2015 | Jacopo Petriccione | Fiorentina | Pistoiese | Loan |
| 26 August 2015 | (Hungary) Bálint Vécsei | (Hungary) Honvéd | Bologna | Undisclosed |
| 26 August 2015 | (Hungary) Bálint Vécsei | Bologna | Lecce | Loan |
| 26 August 2015 | (Brazil) Rafael Toloi | (Brazil) São Paulo | Atalanta | Undisclosed |
| 27 August 2015 | Manuel Coppola | Catania | Ternana | Undisclosed |
| 27 August 2015 | (Bulgaria) Aleksandar Tonev | (England) Aston Villa | Frosinone | Undisclosed |
| 27 August 2015 | Mario Balotelli | (England) Liverpool | Milan | Loan |
| 27 August 2015 | Cristiano Biraghi | Internazionale | (Spain) Granada | Loan |
| 27 August 2015 | Gianluca Litteri | Latina | Cittadella | Loan |
| 27 August 2015 | Gabriel Paletta | Milan | Atalanta | Loan |
| 27 August 2015 | (Spain) Fernando Llorente | Juventus | (Spain) Sevilla | Free |
| 27 August 2015 | Martino Borghese | Spezia | Como | Undisclosed |
| 27 August 2015 | Antonio Bocchetti | Salernitana | Paganese | Undisclosed |
| 27 August 2015 | Ivan Castiglia | Salernitana | Catania | Undisclosed |
| 27 August 2015 | Andrea Bianchimano | Olginatese | Milan | Undisclosed |
| 27 August 2015 | Francesco Valiani | Latina | Bari | Undisclosed |
| 27 August 2015 | Alberto Gilardino | (China) Guangzhou Evergrande | Palermo | Undisclosed |
| 28 August 2015 | Raffaele Pucino | Chievo | Lanciano | Loan |
| 28 August 2015 | Alex Valentini | Spezia | (Switzerland) Lugano | Loan |
| 28 August 2015 | Guido Marilungo | Atalanta | Lanciano | Loan |
| 28 August 2015 | Stefano Gori | Milan | Bari | Undisclosed |
| 28 August 2015 | Michael Fabbro | Milan | Bassano | Undisclosed |
| 28 August 2015 | (Brazil) Paulo Azzi | (Brazil) Tombense | Spezia | Loan |
| 28 August 2015 | (Slovakia) Juraj Kucka | Genoa | Milan | Undisclosed |
| 28 August 2015 | (Senegal) Moussa Souare | Santarcangelo | Bologna | Loan |
| 28 August 2015 | Matteo Malagoli | Bologna | Santarcangelo | Undisclosed |
| 28 August 2015 | (Spain) Joan Verdú | (United Arab Emirates) Baniyas | Fiorentina | Undisclosed |
| 28 August 2015 | Filippo Porcari | Carpi | Bari | Undisclosed |
| 28 August 2015 | Rolando Bianchi | Bologna | (Spain) Mallorca | Free |
| 29 August 2015 | Andrea Rossi | Pescara | Salernitana | 2-year loan |
| 29 August 2015 | (France) Anthony Mounier | (France) Montpellier | Bologna | Undisclosed |
| 29 August 2015 | Massimo Coda | Parma | Salernitana | Free |
| 29 August 2015 | Cristiano Del Grosso | Atalanta | Bari | Loan |
| 29 August 2015 | Michael Agazzi | Milan | (England) Middlesbrough | Loan |
| 29 August 2015 | (Libya) Ahmad Benali | Palermo | Pescara | Loan |
| 29 August 2015 | (Australia) Joshua Brillante | Empoli | Como | Loan |
| 29 August 2015 | Federico Gerardi | Cittadella | Como | Undisclosed |
| 30 August 2015 | Francesco Della Rocca | Palermo | Perugia | Free |
| 30 August 2015 | Andrea Petagna | Milan | Ascoli | Loan |
| 30 August 2015 | (France) Kingsley Coman | Juventus | (Germany) Bayern Munich | 2-year loan |
| 31 August 2015 | Alessandro Camisa | Vicenza | Lecce | Undisclosed |
| 31 August 2015 | (Brazil) Alex Telles | (Turkey) Galatasaray | Internazionale | Loan |
| 31 August 2015 | Gianluca Freddi | Novara | Lecce | Undisclosed |
| 31 August 2015 | (Serbia) Adem Ljajić | Roma | Internazionale | Loan |
| 31 August 2015 | (Senegal) Abou Diop | Torino | Lecce | Loan |
| 31 August 2015 | (Brazil) Felipe Melo | (Turkey) Galatasaray | Internazionale | Undisclosed |
| 31 August 2015 | Michele Rocca | Internazionale | Sampdoria | Undisclosed |
| 31 August 2015 | (Lithuania) Giedrius Matulevičius | Arezzo | Sampdoria | Free |
| 31 August 2015 | Marco Marchionni | Sampdoria | Latina | Undisclosed |
| 31 August 2015 | (France) Mario Lemina | (France) Marseille | Juventus | Loan |
| 31 August 2015 | Riccardo Maciucca | Latina | Grosseto | Loan |
| 31 August 2015 | (Spain) Alejandro Rodríguez | Cesena | Sampdoria | Loan |
| 31 August 2015 | Paolo De Ceglie | Juventus | (France) Marseille | Loan |
| 31 August 2015 | (Ghana) Boadu Maxwell Acosty | Fiorentina | Latina | Undisclosed |
| 31 August 2015 | (Argentina) Ezequiel Ponce | (Argentina) Newell's Old Boys | Roma | €4.2M |
| 31 August 2015 | Antonio Di Nardo | Latina | Sampdoria | €1M |
| 31 August 2015 | (Brazil) Hernanes | Internazionale | Juventus | €11M |
| 31 August 2015 | (Morocco) Hachim Mastour | Milan | (Spain) Málaga | 2-year loan |
| 31 August 2015 | Alessandro Matri | Milan | Lazio | Loan |
| 31 August 2015 | (France) William Vainqueur | (Russia) Dynamo Moscow | Roma | Undisclosed |
| 31 August 2015 | Cristian Bunino | Juventus (at Pro Vercelli, t) | Livorno | Loan |
| 31 August 2015 | Fausto Rossi | Juventus | Pro Vercelli | Loan |
| 31 August 2015 | (Poland) Bartosz Salamon | Sampdoria | Cagliari | Undisclosed |
| 31 August 2015 | (Senegal) Maodo Malick Mbaye | Chievo | Latina | Loan |
| 31 August 2015 | (Brazil) Emerson Palmieri | (Brazil) Santos | Roma | Loan |
| 31 August 2015 | Cristian Pasquato | Juventus | Livorno | Loan |
| 31 August 2015 | Riccardo Cazzola | Atalanta | Livorno | Loan |
| 31 August 2015 | (Chile) Mauricio Isla | Juventus | (France) Marseille | Loan |
| 31 August 2015 | Maikol Negro | Latina | Casertana | Loan |
| 31 August 2015 | (Albania) Lorik Cana | Lazio | (France) Nantes | Undisclosed |
| 31 August 2015 | (Poland) Paweł Wszołek | Sampdoria | Verona | Loan |
| 31 August 2015 | (Greece) Lazaros Christodoulopoulos | Verona | Sampdoria | Loan |
| 31 August 2015 | (Uruguay) Álvaro González | Lazio | (Mexico) Club Atlas | Loan |
| 31 August 2015 | Fabrizio Roberti | Latina | Lupa Castelli Romani | Loan |
| 31 August 2015 | (Venezuela) Andrés Ponce | (Portugal) Olhanense | Sampdoria | Undisclosed |
| 31 August 2015 | Filippo Bandinelli | Fiorentina | Latina | Loan |
| 31 August 2015 | Alessandro Rosina | Catania | Bari | Loan |
| 31 August 2015 | Accursio Bentivegna | Palermo | Como | Loan |
| 31 August 2015 | Giampiero Pinzi | Udinese | Chievo | Undisclosed |
| 31 August 2015 | Francesco Caputo | Bari | Virtus Entella | Loan |
| 31 August 2015 | (The Gambia) Ali Sowe | Chievo | Modena | Loan |
| 31 August 2015 | Luca Maniero | Pordenone | Crotone | Undisclosed |
| 31 August 2015 | (Slovakia) Žan Benedičič | Milan | Como | Undisclosed |
| 31 August 2015 | Cristian Galano | Bari | Vicenza | Loan |
| 31 August 2015 | Davide Voltan | Crotone | Bassano | Loan |
| 31 August 2015 | Alberto Frison | Catania | Salernitana | Loan |
| 31 August 2015 | Andrea Russotto | Salernitana | Catania | Undisclosed |
| 31 August 2015 | (Croatia) Ante Budimir | (Germany) St. Pauli | Crotone | Loan |
| 31 August 2015 | Antonio Martiniello | Salernitana | Paganese | Loan |
| 31 August 2015 | (Bosnia and Herzegovina) Sanjin Prcić | (France) Rennes | Torino | Loan |
| 31 August 2015 | Mirko Esposito | Crotone | Paganese | Loan |
| 31 August 2015 | (Brazil) Caetano Calil | Salernitana | Catania | Undisclosed |
| 31 August 2015 | (Ghana) Moses Odjer | Catania | Salernitana | Loan |
| 31 August 2015 | (Republic of the Congo) Ravy Tsouka | Crotone | Paganese | Loan |
| 31 August 2015 | Andrea Russotto | Salernitana | Catania | Undisclosed |
| 31 August 2015 | Alfredo Donnarumma | Teramo | Salernitana | Undisclosed |
| 31 August 2015 | (Switzerland) Blerim Džemaili | (Turkey) Galatasaray | Genoa | Loan |
| 31 August 2015 | Antonio Grillo | Salernitana | Paganese | Loan |
| 31 August 2015 | (Serbia) Alen Stevanović | Torino | (Serbia) Partizan | Free |
| 31 August 2015 | Luca Liverani | Salernitana | Catania | Undisclosed |
| 31 August 2015 | (Slovakia) Ľubomír Tupta | Catania | Verona | Loan |
| 31 August 2015 | Alessandro Sbaffo | Chievo | Como | Loan |
| 31 August 2015 | Lys Gomis | Torino | Frosinone | Loan |
| 31 August 2015 | Riccardo Maniero | Catania | Bari | Undisclosed |
| 31 August 2015 | (Argentina) Cristian Ansaldi | (Russia) Zenit Saint Petersburg | Genoa | Loan |
| 31 August 2015 | Lorenzo Andrenacci | Brescia | Como | Loan |
| 31 August 2015 | Salvatore Caturano | Bari | Ascoli | Loan |
| 31 August 2015 | Valerio Foglio | Novara | Mantova | Undisclosed |
| 31 August 2015 | (Brazil) Neuton | Udinese | (Spain) Granada | Loan |
| 31 August 2015 | Cristian Dell'Orco | Sassuolo | Novara | Loan |
| 31 August 2015 | (Belgium) Nicolas Napol | Atalanta | Avellino | Loan |
| 31 August 2015 | (Venezuela) Franco Signorelli | Empoli | Ternana | Loan |
| 31 August 2015 | Fabrizio Poli | Carpi | Novara | Loan |
| 31 August 2015 | (Uruguay) Federico Gino | (Uruguay) Defensor Sporting | Carpi | Loan |
| 31 August 2015 | (Belgium) Nicolás Castillo | (Belgium) Club Brugge | Frosinone | Loan |
| 31 August 2015 | Marco Davide Faraoni | Udinese | Novara | Loan |
| 31 August 2015 | Damiano Zanon | Frosinone | Ternana | Undisclosed |
| 31 August 2015 | (Ghana) Isaac Cofie | Genoa | Carpi | Loan |
| 31 August 2015 | (Brazil) Felipe dal Belo | Unattached | Udinese | Free |
| 31 August 2015 | (Slovenia) Vid Belec | Internazionale | Carpi | Undisclosed |
| 31 August 2015 | Cristian Zaccardo | Milan | Carpi | Undisclosed |
| 31 August 2015 | (Belgium) Samuel Bastien | (Belgium) Anderlecht | Avellino | Loan |
| 31 August 2015 | Michele Rigione | Teramo | Lanciano | Undisclosed |
| 31 August 2015 | Luca Di Matteo | Teramo | Lanciano | Undisclosed |
| 1 September 2015 | Marco Borriello | Unattached | Carpi | Free |
| 1 September 2015 | Gionathan Perna | Bari | Fidelis Andria | Free |
| 16 September 2015 | Federico Casarini | Unattached | Novara | Free |
| 16 September 2015 | Dario Bergamelli | Novara | Catania | Undisclosed |
| 16 September 2015 | Desiderio Garufo | Novara | Catania | Undisclosed |
| 18 September 2015 | Michele Canini | Atalanta | Ascoli | Loan |
