= 2014 Torneo di Viareggio =

2014 Viareggio Cup World Football Tournament Coppa Carnevale
66° Torneo di Viareggio

Tournament details
- Host country: Italy
- City: Viareggio
- Dates: February 3, 2014
- Teams: 32

This is the 66th edition of Torneo di Viareggio. The 2014 winners of the Torneo di Viareggio (in English, the Viareggio Tournament, officially the Viareggio Cup World Football Tournament Coppa Carnevale), the annual youth football tournament held in Viareggio, Tuscany, are listed below.

== Format ==
The 32 teams are seeded in 8 pools, split up into 6-pool groups. Each team from a pool meets the others in a single tie. The winning club from each pool and two best runners-up from both group A and group B progress to the final knockout stage. All matches in the final rounds are single tie. The Round of 16 after envisions penalties and no extra time, while the rest of the final round matches include 30 minutes extra time and penalties to be played if the draw between teams still holds.

Four additional clubs are allowed to enter the competition from the Round of 16 onward through a wild card, according to their record of achievements. The wild card will be given at the incontestable discretion of the organising committee. 2014 wild card: Juventus F.C., A.C. Milan, AACF Fiorentina, F.C. Internazionale Milano.

== Participating teams ==
32 teams participate in the tournament. The list of the teams are below.

Italian teams

- (Italy) Atalanta
- (Italy) Serie D Selection U20
- (Italy) Napoli
- (Italy) Palermo
- (Italy) Livorno
- (Italy) Roma
- (Italy) A.C. Siena
- (Italy) Torino
- (Italy) Genoa
- (Italy) U.C. Sampdoria
- (Italy) S.S. Lazio
- (Italy) Varese
- (Italy) Empoli F.C.
- (Italy) Hellas Verona F.C.
- (Italy) Parma
- (Italy) Spezia

European teams

- (Denmark) FC Nordsjælland
- (Belgium) R.S.C. Anderlecht
- (Portugal) S.L. Benfica
- (Norway) Stabæk Fotball
- (Croatia) HNK Rijeka
- (North Macedonia) FK Belasica
- (Netherlands) PSV Eindhoven

American teams

- (Paraguay) Club Guaraní
- (Colombia) Envigado
- (Mexico) Santos Laguna
- (Uruguay) Nacional
- (United States) LIAC New York
- (Brazil) Desportivo Brasil

Asian teams

- (Uzbekistan) Pakhtakor

African teams

- (Democratic Republic of the Congo) Congo U-17

Oceanian teams

- (Australia) APIA Leichhardt

== Group stage ==
=== Group A ===
==== Pool 1 ====
Team	Pld	W	D	L	GF	GA	GD	Pts
(Italy) Atalanta	2	1	1	0	4	3	+1	4
(Italy) Serie D Selection U20	2	1	0	1	3	3	+0	3
(Denmark) FC Nordsjælland	1	0	1	0	1	1	+0	1
(Paraguay) Club Guaraní	1	0	0	1	0	1	-1	0

3 February 2014
16:00 (CET)

Atalanta (Italy)	1–1	(Denmark) FC Nordsjælland
Savi 45'		Ingvartsen 85'

3 February 2014
16:00 (CET)

Serie D Selection U20 (Italy)	1–0	(Paraguay) Club Guaraní
Isoardi 73'

5 February 2014
16:00 (CET)

Atalanta (Italy)	3–2	(Italy) Serie D Selection U20
Bangal 13', 77'; Marchini 79'		Petricciuolo 19'; Gabrielloni 74'

==== Pool 2 ====
Team	Pld	W	D	L	GF	GA	GD	Pts
(Italy) Palermo	2	2	0	0	6	0	+6	6
(Belgium) R.S.C. Anderlecht	1	1	0	0	1	0	+1	3
(Italy) Napoli	2	0	0	2	0	2	-2	0
(Australia) APIA Leichhardt	1	0	0	1	0	5	-5	0

3 February 2014
16:00 (CET)

Napoli (Italy)	0–1	(Belgium) R.S.C. Anderlecht
		Kawaya 54'

3 February 2013
16:00 (CET)

Palermo (Italy)	5–0	(Australia) APIA Leichhardt
Cucchiara 8'; Neves Lourenço 49'; Malele 76'; Aquino 77'; Pirrello 82'

5 February 2014
16:00 (CET)

Napoli (Italy)	0–1	(Italy) Palermo
		Pirrello 45'

==== Pool 3 ====
Team	Pld	W	D	L	GF	GA	GD	Pts
(Colombia) Envigado	2	2	0	0	3	0	+3	6
(Italy) Livorno	2	1	0	1	3	4	-1	3
(Portugal) S.L. Benfica	2	0	1	1	0	1	-1	1
(Italy) Roma	2	0	1	1	2	3	-1	1

3 February 2014
16:00 (CET)

Envigado (Colombia)	2–0	(Italy) Livorno
Moreno 30'; Londoño 39'

3 February 2014
18:15 (CET)

S.L. Benfica (Portugal)	0–0	(Italy) Roma

5 February 2014
16:00 (CET)

Roma (Italy)	2–3	(Italy) Livorno
Ferri 38'; Capradossi 70'		Biasci 5'; Stampa 14'; Gasbarro 27'

5 February 2014
16:00 (CET)

S.L. Benfica (Portugal)	0–1	(Colombia) Envigado
		Londoño 89'

==== Pool 4 ====
Team	Pld	W	D	L	GF	GA	GD	Pts
(Italy) Torino	2	1	1	0	4	0	+4	4
(Mexico) Santos Laguna	2	1	1	0	6	3	+3	4
(Italy) A.C. Siena	2	0	2	0	2	2	+0	2
(Norway) Stabæk Fotball	2	0	0	2	1	8	-7	0

3 February 2013
16:00 (CET)

A.C. Siena (Italy)	2–2	(Mexico) Santos Laguna
Monni 62', 64'		Róbinson 19'; Salas 52'

3 February 2013
16:00 (CET)

Torino (Italy)	4–0	(Norway) Stabæk Fotball
Gyasi 36'; Colombi 66', 90'; Rosa Gastaldo 74'

5 February 2013
16:00 (CET)

Stabæk Fotball (Norway)	1–4	(Mexico) Santos Laguna
Hjorth 37'		Najera 8', 39'; Lacayo 30'; Róbinson 87'

5 February 2014
16:00 (CET)

Torino (Italy)	0–0	(Italy) A.C. Siena

=== Group B ===
==== Pool 5 ====
Team	Pld	W	D	L	GF	GA	GD	Pts
(Italy) Genoa	1	1	0	0	3	0	+3	3
(Italy) U.C. Sampdoria	1	1	0	0	1	0	+1	3
(Croatia) HNK Rijeka	1	0	0	1	0	1	-1	0
(Democratic Republic of the Congo) Congo U-17	1	0	0	1	0	3	-3	0

4 February 2013
16:00 (CET)

Genoa (Italy)	3–0	(Democratic Republic of the Congo) Congo U-17
Tommasone 19'; Sokoli 38'; Giuseppe Panico 90+2'

4 February 2013
16:00 (CET)

U.C. Sampdoria (Italy)	1–0	(Croatia) HNK Rijeka
Lombardo 62' (pen.)

==== Pool 6 ====
Team	Pld	W	D	L	GF	GA	GD	Pts
(Uruguay) Nacional	1	1	0	0	2	0	+2	3
(Italy) S.S. Lazio	1	1	0	0	1	0	+1	3
(North Macedonia) FK Belasica	1	0	0	1	0	1	-1	0
(Italy) Varese	1	0	0	1	0	2	-2	0

4 February 2013
16:00 (CET)

S.S. Lazio (Italy)	1–0	(North Macedonia) FK Belasica
Filippini 86'

4 February 2013
16:00 (CET)

Varese (Italy)	0–2	(Uruguay) Nacional
		Alvarez 32'; Gonzales 55'

==== Pool 7 ====
Team	Pld	W	D	L	GF	GA	GD	Pts
(Italy) Hellas Verona F.C.	1	1	0	0	10	2	+8	3
(Netherlands) PSV Eindhoven	1	1	0	0	2	0	+2	3
(Italy) Empoli F.C.	1	0	0	1	0	2	-2	0
(United States) LIAC New York	1	0	0	1	2	10	-10	0

4 February 2013
16:00 (CET)

Hellas Verona F.C. (Italy)	10–2	(United States) LIAC New York
Gatto 5', 13', 41'; Alba 29', 31'; Varricchio 35'; Zaccagni 45+1'; Birlea 61', 86'; Formigoni 81'		Mills 10'; Lamberti 74'

4 February 2013
18:15 (CET)

Empoli F.C. (Italy)	0–2	(Netherlands) PSV Eindhoven
		Hiwat 14'; Wouters 49'

==== Pool 8 ====
Team	Pld	W	D	L	GF	GA	GD	Pts
(Italy) Parma	1	1	0	0	3	1	+2	3
(Brazil) Desportivo Brasil	1	1	0	0	2	0	+2	3
(Italy) Spezia	1	0	0	1	0	2	-2	0
(Uzbekistan) Pakhtakor	1	0	0	1	1	3	-2	0

4 February 2013
16:00 (CET)

Parma (Italy)	3–1	(Uzbekistan) Pakhtakor
Dias 21'; Cerri 62' (pen.); Silipo 80'		Thchatw 43'

4 February 2013
16:00 (CET)

Spezia (Italy)	0–2	(Brazil) Desportivo Brasil
		Juninho 20'; Arthur 43'
