= Antonio Negro =

Italian footballer (born 1998)

Personal information
- Date of birth: 10 May 1998 (age 28)
- Place of birth: Marcianise, Italy
- Height: 1.90 m (6 ft 3 in)
- Position: Forward

Team information
- Current team: Savoia
- Number: 9

Youth career
- 2005–2012: ADS Recale 2002
- 2012–2017: Napoli

Senior career*
Years	Team	Apps	(Gls)
2017–2019	Napoli	0	(0)
2017	→ Latina (loan)	2	(0)
2017–2018	→ Paganese (loan)	7	(0)
2019–2020	Pontedera	10	(0)
2020	Foligno	9	(1)
2020	Matese	5	(2)
2020–2021	Nola	5	(1)
2021	Giugliano	6	(0)
2021	Real Normanna	11	(0)
2021	Sora		
2021	Albanova		
2021–2023	Isernia		
2023–2024	Castelvolturno		
2024–	Savoia	8	(3)

International career
2014	Italy U16	2	(0)
- * Club domestic league appearances and goals as of 17 November 2024

Antonio Negro (born 10 June 1998) is an Italian footballer who plays as a forward for Serie D club Savoia.

== Club career ==
=== Napoli ===
Negro joined the Napoli football academy in 2012 from ADS Recale 2002.

==== Loan to Latina ====
On 31 January 2017, Negro was signed by Serie B club Latina on a 6-month loan deal. On 13 May, Negro made his professional debut for Latina in Serie B as a substitute replacing Riccardo Maciucca in the 75th minute of a 2–2 draw against Perugia. On 18 May he played his second match for Latina, against as a substitute, replacing Roberto Insigne in the 56th minute of a 2–1 away defeat against Avellino. Negro ended his 6-month loan to Latina with only 2 appearances, both as a substitute.

==== Loan to Paganese ====
On 17 July 2017, Negro was loaned to Serie C side Paganese on a season-long loan deal. On 30 July he made his debut for Paganese in a 6–0 away defeat against Trapani in the first round of Coppa Italia, he played the entire match. On 26 August, Negro made his Serie C debut for Paganese in a 2–0 home defeat against Bisceglie, he was replaced by Giuliano Regolanti in the 55th minute. Negro ended his season-long loan to Paganese with only 7 appearances, only 1 as a starter.

=== Pontedera ===
On 26 July 2019, he signed with Pontedera.

=== Foligno ===
On 4 January 2020, he joined Serie D club Foligno.

== International career ==
Negro represented the Italy national under-16 football team in 2014.

== Career statistics ==
=== Club ===
As of 11 February 2018

Appearances and goals by club, season and competition
Club	Season	League			Cup		Europe		Other		Total	
Club	Season	League	Apps	Goals	Apps	Goals	Apps	Goals	Apps	Goals	Apps	Goals
Latina (loan)	2016–17	Serie C	2	0	—		—		—		2	0
Paganese (loan)	2017–18	Serie C	7	0	1	0	—		—		8	0
Career total			9	0	1	0	—		—		10	0
