= Muslimović =

Muslimović is a surname. Notable people with the surname include:

- Halid Muslimović (born 1961), Bosnian singer
- Kenan Muslimović (born 1997), Austrian and Bosnian footballer
- Nusret Muslimović (born 1975), Bosnian football manager
- Zlatan Muslimović (born 1981), Bosnian footballer
