= Novara Calcio Youth Sector =

Italian football club

- Full name: Novara Calcio Youth Sector
- Nickname: I Biancoazzurri (The White-Blues)
- Ground: Novarello Villaggio Azzurro – Novara, Italy
- Head coach: Giuseppe Mascara
- League: Campionato Primavera 4 (Group A)
- 2023–24: Campionato Primavera 4 (Group A), 5th
- Website: http://www.novaracalcio.com/en/squadre/berretti
Home colours	Away colours	Third colours

Novara Calcio Youth Sector (Italian: Settore Giovanile) comprised the under-19 team and the academy of Italian professional football club Novara Calcio. The club played in Group C of the Campionato Nazionale Primavera. They played in Group A of the league until the end of the 2015–16 season.

== Primavera ==
=== Squad ===
As of 29 August 2016.

Note: Flags indicate national team as defined under FIFA eligibility rules; some limited exceptions apply. Players may hold more than one non-FIFA nationality.

No.	Pos.	Nation	Player
—	GK	ITA	Alessandro Frigione
—	GK	ITA	Cristiano Ragone
—	GK	ITA	Niccolò Intorre
—	GK	ITA	Stefano Frattini
—	DF	ITA	Alberto Zacchi
—	DF	ITA	Andrea Malberti
—	DF	POR	Carvalho Demetrio Rafael Mendes
—	DF	ITA	Davide Bove
—	DF	ITA	Federico D'Astoli
—	DF	ITA	Federico Pasqualoni
—	DF	POR	Ferreira Tiago Alexandre Oliveira
—	DF	ITA	Mario Bellich
—	DF	ITA	Nicolò Carrara
—	DF	ITA	Pietro Guatieri
—	MF	ITA	Alessandro Campus

No.	Pos.	Nation	Player
—	MF	ITA	Andrea Salmoiraghi
—	MF	GHA	Emmanuel Agyemang
—	MF	ITA	Filippo Nardi
—	MF	ITA	Isaia Lattarulo
—	MF	ITA	Massimo Trabuio
—	MF	POR	Oliveira Almeida Pereira Pedro Manuel Gomes
13	MF	ITA	Riccardo Collodel
—	FW	ITA	Andrea Penna
23	FW	CRO	Antonio Lukanović
—	FW	ITA	Axel Caldirola
—	FW	ITA	Dario Bollini
—	FW	POR	Eynel Domingo Lima Soares
33	FW	ITA	Francesco Salucci
—	FW	BEL	Moutir Chajia

'*' denotes a player with first-team appearances

== Non-playing staff ==
As of 29 September 2015.

- Manager: Giacomo Gattuso
- Fitness Coach: Stefano Pavon
- Goalkeeping Coach: Renato Redaelli
- Team Doctor: Dario Dameno
- Team Manager: Dino Lo Curto
- Team Manager: Marco Morganti

== Players with dual nationality ==
- (France) (Algeria) Mouloud Sana
- (Italy) (Russia) Andrea Antonielli

== Youth system ==
The training facility(s) of Novara's Youth Sector is based at Novarello Villaggio Azzurro.

Below the Primavera team (U19), there are ten other teams:

- Allievi Nazionali (U17)
- Allievi Lega Pro (U16)
- Giovanissimi Nazionali (U15)
- Giovanissimi Regionali (U14)
- Giovanissimi Sperimentali (U13)
- Esordienti (U12)
- Pulcini Regionali (U11)
- Pulcini B (U10)
- Pulcini C (U9)
- Scuola Calcio (U8)

Moreover, Novara has 53 affiliated clubs around Italy, such as:

- Accademia Calcio Sabaudia
- Amor Sportiva
- Aquile della Brianza
- Don Bosco
- Beata Giuliana
