= Bardini =

Bardini is an Italian surname. Notable people with the surname include:

- Aleksander Bardini (1913–1995), Polish theatre and opera director, actor, and professor
- Gaetano Bardini (1926–2017), Italian tenor
- Lorenzo Bardini (born 1996), Italian footballer
- Samanta Bardini (born 1977), Italian softball player
- Stefano Bardini (1836–1922), Italian connoisseur and art dealer
