= Kenan Muslimović =

Austrian footballer (born 1997)

Personal information
- Date of birth: 13 February 1997 (age 29)
- Place of birth: Vienna, Austria
- Height: 1.86 m (6 ft 1 in)
- Position: Forward

Team information
- Current team: DJK Ammerthal
- Number: 30

Youth career
- 2012–2013: Austria Wien
- 2013–2014: Admira Wacker
- 2014: Austria Wien
- 2014–2015: First Vienna
- 2015: Novara

Senior career*
Years	Team	Apps	(Gls)
2014–2015	First Vienna II	18	(2)
2016	Mladost Doboj Kakanj	1	(0)
2016–2017	Novi Pazar	11	(0)
2017	1. FC Kaiserslautern II	11	(0)
2018	Jahn Regensburg II	30	(18)
2019	Mladost Doboj Kakanj	10	(0)
2019	FC Pipinsried	12	(5)
2020	Lokomotiv Plovdiv	12	(1)
2021–2022	SV Donaustauf	20	(7)
2022	DSV Leoben	10	(1)
2022	SpVgg SV Weiden	0	(0)
2022–	DJK Ammerthal	16	(7)
- * Club domestic league appearances and goals as of 12 November 2022

Kenan Muslimović (born 13 February 1997) is an Austrian and Bosnian professional footballer who plays as a forward for German amateur club DJK Ammerthal.

== Career ==
Born in Vienna, he started playing in the youth teams of Austrian clubs Austria Wien and Admira Wacker. In the summer 2014, he joined the senior team of First Vienna FC, however, he played for the B team.

Following summer, in 2015, he moved to Italy and signed for the youth team of Novara Calcio During the first half of the season, making three appearances in the youth league. Novara won the race with Red Bull Salzburg in signing him.

During the winter-break of the 2015–16 season, he left Italy and moved to former-Yugoslavia to join Bosnian side Mladost Doboj Kakanj. playing in the Premier League of Bosnia and Herzegovina. Regarded as a major talent, in summer 2016 he moved to Serbia. Initially, he was about to join FK Partizan's farm-club FK Teleoptik, thus following a family tradition, since his father, who had ended his career prematurely because of illness, had played for the Partizan youth team. However, instead, he ended up joining top-league side Novi Pazar.

He failed to debut in the SuperLiga during the first half of the 2016–17 season. In December 2016 and January 2017, he was on trials at German club Hertha BSC. He ended up staying at Novi Pazar, and made his debut in the Serbian SuperLiga on 18 February 2017, in the first round played after winter-break. In August 2017, he left Novi Pazar.

Between summer 2017 and January 2019, Muslimović played in Germany for the second teams of 1. FC Kaiserslautern and Jahn Regensburg.

On 25 January 2019, he returned to Mladost Doboj Kakanj in the Premier League of Bosnia and Herzegovina. After half a season, on 9 June 2019, Muslimović left Mladost.

Ahead of the 2019–20 season, Muslimović returned to Germany and joined FC Pipinsried. After a spell in Bulgaria, he moved back to Germany once more to play for SV Donaustauf.

== Personal life ==
Kenan is the nephew of Bosnian singer Halid Muslimović.

== Honours ==
Lokomotiv Plovdiv

- Bulgarian Cup: 2019–20
- Bulgarian Supercup: 2020
