= Giuseppe Mascara =

Italian football coach and former player (born 1979)

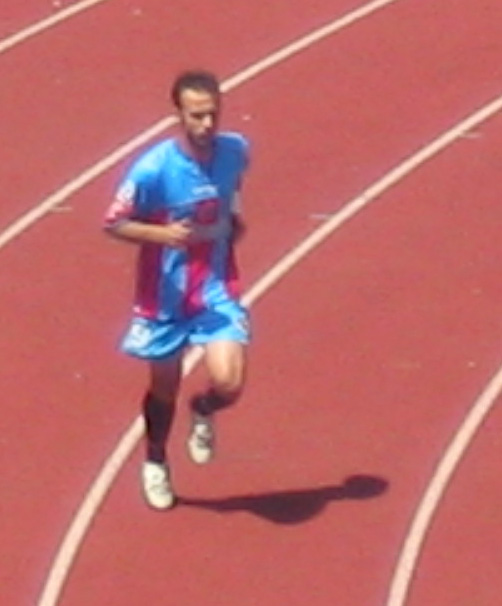

Personal information
- Date of birth: 22 August 1979 (age 47)
- Place of birth: Caltagirone, Italy
- Height: 1.73 m (5 ft 8 in)
- Position: Forward

Team information
- Current team: Pontedera (head coach)

Youth career
- 1994–1995: Comiso

Senior career*
Years	Team	Apps	(Gls)
1995–1997	Ragusa	29	(5)
1997–2000	Battipagliese	48	(10)
2000–2001	Avellino	29	(16)
2001	Salernitana	1	(1)
2001–2003	Palermo	38	(9)
2002–2003	→ Genoa (loan)	13	(2)
2003–2011	Catania	226	(58)
2004–2005	→ Perugia (loan)	37	(4)
2011–2012	Napoli	21	(4)
2012	Novara	15	(3)
2012–2013	Al Nasr	22	(13)
2013–2014	Pescara	27	(4)
2014–2015	Siracusa	31	(14)
2016	Scordia	17	(9)

International career
2009	Italy	1	(0)

Managerial career
- 2017–2018: Giarre
- 2018: Sancataldese
- 2019–2020: Biancavilla
- 2020–2021: Troina
- 2021–2022: Siracusa
- 2023: Comiso
- 2024: Real Aci
- 2025: Novara
- 2025: Paternò
- 2026–: Pontedera
- * Club domestic league appearances and goals

Giuseppe Mascara (Italian pronunciation: [dʒuˈzɛppe maˈskaːra]; born 22 August 1979) is an Italian football coach and former player who played as a striker or a wide forward. He is the head coach of Serie D club Pontedera.

== Club career ==
=== Ragusa ===
Mascara started out playing for the youth side of Sicilian amateurs Comiso before transferring to neighbouring club Ragusa to start his professional career. He earned some valuable experience over a two-season period, turning out for the first team and scoring 5 goals in 29 appearances.

=== Battipagliese ===
Successively, Mascara moved to the mainland, joining Campanian side Battipagliese in 1997, and remained with the then-Serie C1 club until June 2000, playing just under 50 games for them also scoring 67 goals. Following his impressive three-season stint with the club, he transferred to another Campanian team, Avellino.

=== Avellino and Salernitana ===
Following his 2000 transfer to Avellino, Mascara was soon a big hit at the southern Italian club, where he strongly impressed during his lone season with the club, securing 16 goals in 29 games. He then briefly moved to nearby rivals Salernitana, scoring in his only appearance for the club, before moving back to Sicily with Palermo.

=== Palermo ===
In January 2001, Mascara officially transferred to Palermo, who had just been promoted back into Serie B. He began his career well in the Sicilian capital, grabbing 8 Serie B goals in 38 league appearances. In his second and final season with Palermo, Mascara was sent on loan to Genoa, where he made just 13 league starts, scoring twice. He returned to Palermo but was transfer-listed and soon signed for Sicilian rivals, Catania.

=== Catania ===
In July 2003, Mascara joined Catania. In his first season with the club, then playing in Serie B, he was an undisputed starter, making 41 league appearances and scoring 13 goals. Following an impressive first season in Catania, however, the player was surprisingly sent out on loan for the 2004–05 Serie B season, playing for Perugia. During his season-long loan, he made 37 league appearances, scoring four goals.

Mascara returned to Sicily for the 2005–06 Serie B season, where Catania went on to finish second in the league and earn promotion to Serie A. He contributed 14 goals in 36 appearances following his return. In his first Serie A season, the 26-year-old formed a formidable partnership with Gionatha Spinesi, as the duo led Catania to an impressive 13th-place league finish. Mascara ended his season with six league goals in 28 starts.

In his second Serie A season, Mascara again impressed, making 35 league appearances and scoring four goals, playing the season as a second striker. The player shined during the 2008–09 Serie A campaign, scoring 12 goals in just 34 appearances. That tally also increases to 15 goals, including the Coppa Italia; to date, it was his most successful season under then-coach Walter Zenga. On 1 March 2009, Mascara scored a remarkable goal in the Sicilian derby away to Palermo at Stadio Renzo Barbera, taking a long-lobbed shot on the volley from around 55 metres out which left Italian international goalkeeper Marco Amelia falling back into his own net. Catania went on to win that match 0–4 courtesy of goals from Pablo Ledesma, Takayuki Morimoto, Mascara and Michele Paolucci. The goal was later nominated as the Serie A goal of the season.

The 2009–10 season also proved successful, as his club finished well above the relegation zone in 12th, reaching the club's record points total in Serie A. With eight goals scored, Mascara was his club's fourth-top goalscorer, behind Maxi López (12), Takayuki Morimoto (12) and Jorge Martínez (9). He played over 150 matches and also served as the captain of the Rossazzurri.

=== Napoli ===
On 31 January 2011, the final day of the January transfer window, Mascara signed for Napoli for a €1.3 million transfer fee, signing a contract lasting until 2013. He made his debut on 6 February 2011 against Cesena, coming on as a 74th-minute substitute for midfielder Marek Hamšík. In this game, he supplied an assist to José Sosa to make the score 2–0. Mascara made his European debut on 17 February in a 0–0 draw with Villarreal in the UEFA Europa League, a game in which he also started. Mascara's first goal for the Azzurri came on 10 April 2011, the first in a 0–2 victory over Bologna.

=== Novara ===
On 11 January 2012, Mascara signed for Novara on a contract lasting until 2014.

=== Al Nasr ===
On 24 June 2012, Mascara joined Emirati club Al Nasr on a one-year deal pending a successful medical. He was targeted by head coach Walter Zenga after Al Nasr striker Luca Toni asked to leave the club after poor form in the first six months of his one-year stay in Dubai. The contract for Mascara was understood to include an option for a further season. On 5 July 2012, Novara announced his contract was finally terminated, leaving him free to join the Dubai-based club. On 5 October 2012, Mascara broke the deadlock and scored his first two goals with Al Nasr to help his team in an eventual away 4–2 victory over Al Shabab.

=== Pescara ===
Mascara joined Serie B side Pescara in 2013, marking his return to Italy. However, he was released after only a season.

=== Post-professional clubs ===
In 2014 Mascara joined amateur club Siracusa and won Eccellenza Sicily in 2015.

== International career ==
Following his impressive performances with Catania in the 2008–09 season, Mascara received his first call-up to the Italy national team for the 6 June 2009 friendly game against Northern Ireland, together with teammate Marco Biagianti. Mascara played the entire first half of the game, becoming the first Catania player to mark an appearance with the Italian team.

== Coaching career ==
After retiring in 2016, he accepted an offer from Catania to coach their Under-15 youth team.

On 24 October 2017, he was named new head coach of Eccellenza Sicily amateurs Giarre.

In June 2018 he was named head coach of Sicilian Serie D club Sancataldese, a role from which he resigned later in December of the same year due to poor results.

On 12 October 2019, he was appointed head coach of Serie D club Biancavilla, exactly one day before his new club hosted Sicilian powerhouse Palermo. He left the club at the end of the season.

On 29 December 2020 he was named new head coach of Serie D club Troina. He left the club by the end of the season.

On 20 September 2021, he was hired as the new head coach of Eccellenza club Siracusa. After guiding the club to fifth place in the league table, he was confirmed for the 2022–23 season, but was fired on 24 October 2022 due to negative results.

He then briefly served as head coach of Eccellenza Sicily club Comiso during the 2023–24 pre-season. Following that, Mascara worked as head coach of Acireale-based Promozione amateurs Real Aci from February to April 2024.

In July 2024, Mascara was announced as the new manager of Novara FC's U-19 team, Novara Primavera. On 1 April 2025, he was promoted in charge of the first team following the dismissal of Giacomo Gattuso.
