= Halid Muslimović =

Bosnian singer

- Birth name: Halid Muslimović
- Born: 21 January 1961 (age 64); Prijedor, SFR Yugoslavia
- Genres: Folk, Pop-folk
- Occupation: Musician

Halid Muslimović (born 21 January 1961) is a Bosnian singer. He is considered to be one of the best-known and best-selling folk singers in the former Yugoslavia. He is also considered to be among the progenitors of turbo folk genre. His 1985 album, Putuj, putuj, srećo moja was sold in over 800 000 units and was, at the time, the third best-selling album ever in former Yugoslavia.

He is married to Adelisa. The couple has two children, son Enis (b. 1991) and daughter Lejla (b. 1995). Footballer Kenan Muslimović is his nephew.

== Discography ==
He released the following albums:

- Amela, Ti i Ja (1982, Gold)
- Stoj jarane (1983, Platinum)
- Hej ljubavi, u dalekom gradu (1984, 2*Diamond)
- Putuj, putuj srećo moja (1985, over 800 000 sold)
- Piši, piši jarane (1986, Diamond)
- Idi druže, laku noć (1987.)
- Ljube mi se tvoje usne (1988.)
- Vrati se, dok mladosti ima (1988.)
- Kunem se (1989.)
- Izdala me snaga (1990.)
- Ne dozvoli (1992.)
- Mene je učilo vrijeme No 1 (1993.)
- Mene Je učilo vrijeme No 2 (1993.)
- Sve je ovo prokleto (1994.)
- Loša navika (1997.)
- Bolje svatovi (1998.)
- Stranac u svom gradu (2000.)
- Želiš me (2002.)
- Opsesija (2005.)
- Greška Najmilija (2008.)
- Adrenalin (2013.)
