= Antonio Loi =

Italian footballer (born 1996)

Personal information
- Date of birth: 25 August 1996 (age 30)
- Place of birth: Isili, Italy
- Height: 1.71 m (5 ft 7 1/2 in)
- Position: Attacking midfielder

Team information
- Current team: Costa Orientale Sarda
- Number: 10

Youth career
- –2013: Cagliari

Senior career*
Years	Team	Apps	(Gls)
2013–2016	Cagliari	5	(0)
2015	→ Carpi (loan)	0	(0)
2015–2016	→ Reggiana (loan)	7	(0)
2016–2017	Modena	24	(1)
2018	FeralpiSalò	1	(0)
2018–2019	Arzachena	10	(0)
2019–2020	Muravera Calcio	22	(3)
2020–2023	Arzachena	57	(9)
2023–	Costa Orientale Sarda	51	(2)

International career
- Italy U15
- * Club domestic league appearances and goals as of 6 October 2025

Antonio Loi (born 25 August 1996) is an Italian footballer who plays as an attacking midfielder for Serie D club Costa Orientale Sarda.

== Career ==
On 16 July 2016, he joined Modena.

On 23 July 2019, he signed with Serie D club Muravera.
