= Andrea Russotto =

Italian footballer (born 1988)

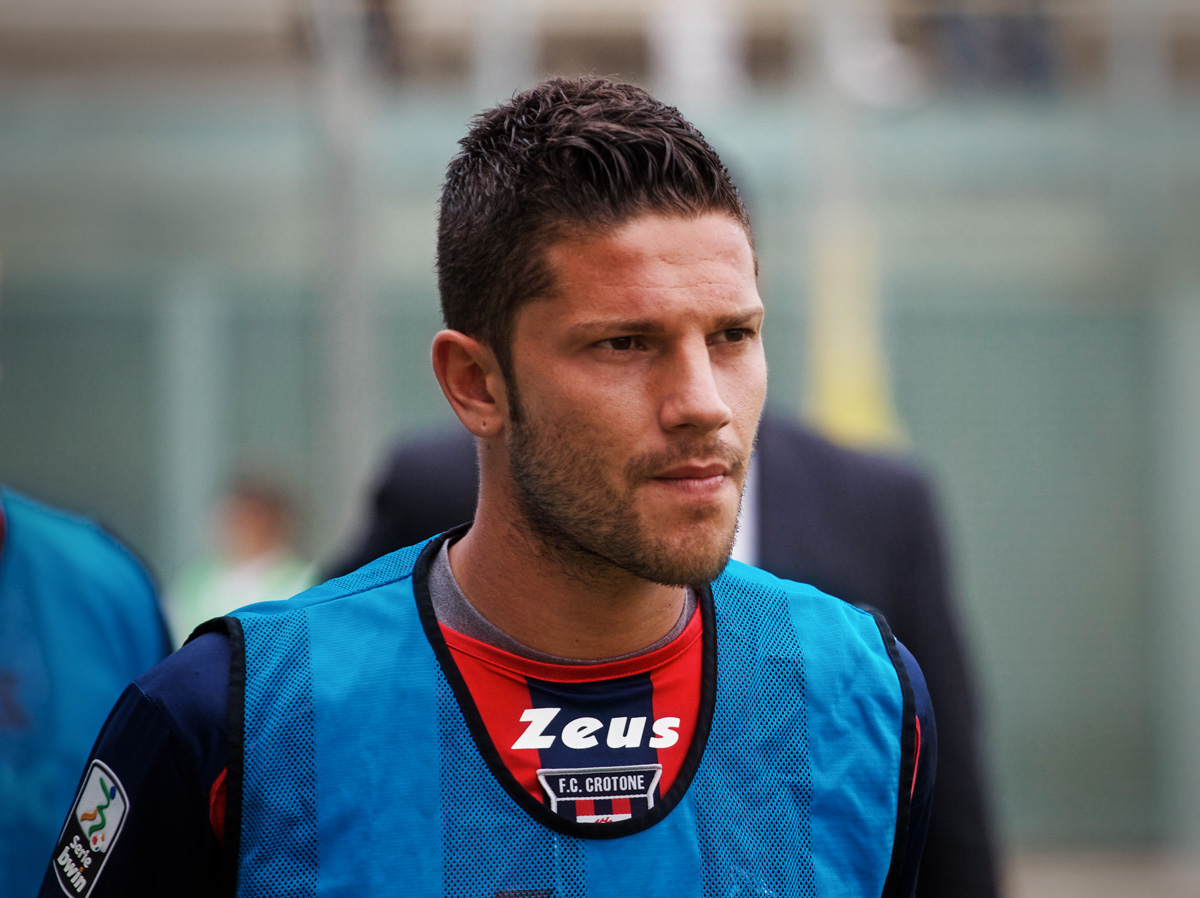

Personal information
- Date of birth: 25 May 1988 (age 38)
- Place of birth: Rome, Italy
- Height: 1.75 m (5 ft 9 in)
- Position: Attacking midfielder

Team information
- Current team: Acireale

Youth career
- Lazio

Senior career*
Years	Team	Apps	(Gls)
2004–2011	Bellinzona	17	(1)
2005	→ Cisco Roma (loan)	2	(0)
2005–2008	→ Treviso (loan)	67	(5)
2008–2009	→ Napoli (loan)	15	(0)
2010–2011	→ Crotone (loan)	45	(3)
2011–2012	Livorno	3	(0)
2012	→ Carrarese (loan)	11	(1)
2012–2015	Catanzaro	79	(15)
2015	Salernitana	0	(0)
2015–2018	Catania	75	(14)
2018–2019	Sambenedettese	32	(1)
2019–2021	Cavese	40	(8)
2021–2022	Catania	39	(6)
2022–2023	Catania	26	(8)
2023–2025	Siracusa	39	(9)
2025–	Acireale	0	(0)

International career
2003	Italy U15	4	(0)
2003–2004	Italy U16	14	(6)
2003–2005	Italy U17	11	(3)
2005	Italy U18	2	(0)
2006	Italy U19	1	(0)
2006–2007	Italy U20	3	(0)
2006–2008	Italy U21	9	(2)
2008	Italy U23	0	(0)
- * Club domestic league appearances and goals as of 4 May 2025

Andrea Russotto (born 25 May 1988) is an Italian footballer who plays as an attacking midfielder for Serie D club Acireale.

== Club career ==
He started his career as part of the S.S. Lazio youth system.

=== Bellinzona and loans ===
In 2004, Russotto, already a regular in the national youth teams, was approached by football agency GEA World, which wanted to represent the rising star. Russotto refused the pressure from GEA and, in order to get away from their continuing pressure, he moved to Switzerland, where he signed for AC Bellinzona, a team from the Italian part of Switzerland that was playing in the Swiss Challenge League at the time.

In 2005, newly promoted Serie A club Treviso acquired his services on loan but made him play with the Primavera side all season, where he formed a valid striking partnership with Italian youth international Robert Acquafresca. Russotto did later make his debut in Serie A that season, at the age of 17, and completed the season with four first-team appearances. Famed magazine World Soccer even inserted Russotto on the list of the top 50 young players in the world, as one of only two Italians (the other being Lorenzo De Silvestri).

The following season, Treviso extended the loan (although they had been relegated to Serie B) and Russotto finally started to show signs of a potential explosion. He made his Italy U21 debut at the age of 18 and racked up 32 appearances and 4 goals that season. Treviso extended his loan for one more year in 2007–08, but even though he played 31 times and scored 1 goal, Russotto failed to perform at a high level like the previous season and was used mainly as a sub.

In the summer of 2008, he finally returned to Bellinzona, and then left out again on loan, this time to join Napoli in the Serie A, with an option for the Southern Italian side to make the move permanent. However, the young trequartista was used sparingly by head coach Edy Reja and his end-of-season substitute Roberto Donadoni, and Napoli then decided not to exercise the buy-out clause; therefore, Russotto was sent back to Switzerland again.

He consequently returned to Switzerland, where he spent the first half of the season playing with AC Bellinzona's first team in the Swiss Super League. In January 2010, he was sent on loan (with a permanent move option) to Serie B club Crotone.

=== Livorno ===
In summer 2011, Russotto was signed by Serie B club Livorno in a definitive deal. On 31 January 2012, he was signed by Carrarese Calcio.

=== Serie C ===
In October 2012 Russotto was signed by Lega Pro Prima Divisione club Catanzaro as a free agent. In January 2013 Serie A club Parma signed half of the registration rights of Russotto (by signing Russotto outright and sold back 50% registration rights of Russotto to Catanzaro for a peppercorn fee of €500.). In June 2014, Parma gave up the 50% registration rights for free.

On 16 July 2015, Russotto was sold to Serie B club Salernitana. He played twice for the team in 2015–16 Coppa Italia.

On 31 August 2015, Russotto and Caetano were signed by Lega Pro club Calcio Catania in definitive deals, with Alberto Frison moved in the opposite direction in a definitive deal.

On 19 July 2019, he signed with Cavese.

On 14 January 2021, he returned to Catania on a 1.5-year contract. On 9 April 2022, he was released together with all of his Catania teammates following the club's exclusion from Italian football due to its inability to overcome a number of financial issues.

In August 2022, Russotto re-signed for refounded Serie D club Catania.

== International career ==
Russotto made his U21 team debut against Luxembourg U21 on 12 December 2006, replacing Valerio Virga at half-time and notching an assist. He played once for the U23 team in a friendly match. He was then placed on reserve for the 2008 Olympics squad and was later called up to replace the injured Claudio Marchisio.
