= Francesco Pacini (footballer) =

Italian footballer (born 1995)

Personal information
- Date of birth: 7 January 1995 (age 31)
- Place of birth: Sinalunga, Italy
- Height: 1.96 m (6 ft 5 in)
- Position: Goalkeeper

Team information
- Current team: Poggibonsi
- Number: 1

Youth career
- Empoli

Senior career*
Years	Team	Apps	(Gls)
2014–2015	Poggibonsi	29	(0)
2015–2019	Novara	3	(0)
2017–2018	→ Trapani (loan)	1	(0)
2018–2019	→ Teramo (loan)	9	(0)
2019–2020	Modena	3	(0)
2021–2025	Poggibonsi	124	(0)
2025–2026	Follonica Gavorrano	15	(0)
2026–	Poggibonsi	0	(0)
- * Club domestic league appearances and goals as of 22 February 2026

Francesco Pacini (born 7 January 1995) is an Italian footballer who plays as a goalkeeper for Serie D club Poggibonsi.

== Biography ==
Born in Sinalunga, Tuscany, Pacini started his career at Tuscan side Empoli, which he was a player for their youth teams since 2009–10 season. Pacini was a player for Empoli's reserve team from 2012–13 to 2013–14 season, as the second keeper behind Matteo Ricci and Matteo Biggeri respectively. However, he also received call-up from the first team for the decisive match for the promotion to Serie A, as the third keeper, in May 2014. He did not enter the starting lineup as well as the bench.

In 2014, he was signed by Serie D club Poggibonsi. On 10 July 2015 Pacini was signed by Serie B newcomer Novara.

Pacini made his professional and Serie B debut in April 2016.

For the 2019–20 season, he joined Modena.
