= Alessio Lo Porto =

Italian footballer (born 1996)

Personal information
- Date of birth: 4 April 1996 (age 30)
- Place of birth: Rome, Italy
- Height: 1.81 m (5 ft 11 in)
- Position: Defender

Youth career
- –2014: Siena

Senior career*
Years	Team	Apps	(Gls)
2014–2015	Perugia	2	(0)
2015–2016	Ternana	0	(0)
2016–2017	Tuttocuoio	13	(1)
2017–2019	Gubbio	44	(0)
2019–2020	Arzignano	11	(0)
2021	Rieti	3	(0)
2021	Vis Artena	17	(0)
2021–2023	Trastevere	44	(2)
2023–2024	Pianese	19	(2)

International career^{‡}
2014–2015	Italy U-19	8	(0)
- * Club domestic league appearances and goals as of 5 May 2024 ‡ National team caps and goals as of 25 February 2015

Alessio Lo Porto (born 4 April 1996) is an Italian footballer who plays as a defender.

== Club career ==
He made his Serie B debut for Perugia on 28 October 2014 in a game against Avellino.

On 7 September 2019, he joined Arzignano.

== International career ==
Lo Porto was a youth international for Italy U-19.
