= Giovanni Sbrissa =

Italian footballer

Personal information
- Date of birth: 25 September 1996 (age 30)
- Place of birth: Castelfranco Veneto, Italy
- Height: 1.85 m (6 ft 1 in)
- Position: Midfielder

Team information
- Current team: Bassano

Youth career
- Vicenza

Senior career*
Years	Team	Apps	(Gls)
2013–2015	Vicenza	43	(1)
2015–2019	Sassuolo	0	(0)
2015–2016	→ Vicenza (loan)	26	(1)
2016–2017	→ Brescia (loan)	19	(0)
2017–2018	→ Cesena (loan)	8	(1)
2018	→ Cremonese (loan)	3	(0)
2018–2019	→ Siena (loan)	26	(0)
2019–2020	Pergolettese	6	(0)
2020–2021	Lucchese	25	(0)
2021–2022	RG Ticino	20	(1)
2022	Clodiense	7	(0)
2022–2023	Acireale	17	(4)
2023–2024	Trapani	19	(4)
2024–	Bassano	2	(0)

International career
2014–2015	Italy U19	4	(0)
2015–2016	Italy U20	3	(0)
- * Club domestic league appearances and goals as of 5 May 2024

Giovanni Sbrissa (born 25 September 1996) is an Italian professional footballer who plays as a midfielder for Serie D club Bassano.

== Club career ==
=== Vicenza ===
Born in Castelfranco Veneto, Veneto region, Sbrissa started his career at Venetian club Vicenza. On 17 July 2013, he received a call-up from the first team for a pre-season camp. He made his debut on 4 August, against Feralpisalò in 2013–14 Coppa Italia. Sbrissa played 11 times for Vicenza in 2013–14 Lega Pro Prima Divisione. He extended his contract to 30 June 2016 on 4 March 2014.

In 2014–15 season Vicenza was admitted to 2014–15 Serie B, which Sbrissa played 32 times in the league, as No.20. He also played once in Italian Cup.

On 8 June 2015, Sbrissa signed a new three-year contract. However, less than a month later he was sold.

=== Sassuolo ===
On 30 June 2015, Sbrissa was signed by Sassuolo for €840,000, in a five-year contract; Thomas Manfredini was signed by Vicenza in a definitive deal in exchange on a free transfer. Sbrissa also immediately returned to Vicenza for 2015–16 Serie B, on a temporary deal.

==== Vicenza (loan) ====
Sbrissa returned to Vicenza from Sassuolo, effective on 1 July 2015. He changed to wear No.11 shirt, which previous owners Leonardo Spinazzola and Srđan Spiridonović had returned to Juventus and changed to wear No.20 shirt respectively.

==== Brescia (loan) ====
On 31 August 2016, Sbrissa was signed by Brescia on a temporary deal from Sassuolo. He was part of Sassuolo's 2016 pre-season campaign.

On 21 June 2017, Brescia excised the option to buy the player. However, Sassuolo also excised the counter-option on the next day.

==== Cesena (loan) ====
On 12 July 2017, Sbrissa was signed by Cesena on a temporary basis, with an option to buy him outright from Sassuolo.

==== Siena (loan) ====
On 31 July 2018, Sbrissa joined to Siena on loan until 30 June 2019.

=== Pergolettese ===
On 2 September 2019, he signed with Pergolettese.

== International career ==
Sbrissa played four times for Italy national under-19 football team in 2014–15 season, all friendlies. He missed the elite round of the qualification due to injury. Sbrissa was replaced by Andrea Palazzi instead.
