= Federico Pasqualoni =

Italian footballer

Personal information
- Date of birth: 19 March 1997 (age 29)
- Place of birth: Rome, Italy
- Height: 1.87 m (6 ft 2 in)
- Position: Defender

Senior career*
Years	Team	Apps	(Gls)
2017–2019	Cosenza	10	(0)
2018–2019	→ Casertana (loan)	2	(1)
- * Club domestic league appearances and goals

Federico Pasqualoni (born 19 March 1997) is a former Italian football player.

== Club career ==
He made his Serie C debut for Cosenza on 21 October 2017 in a game against Bisceglie.

He had to retire from playing at the age of 22 due to ACL rupture.
