= Lorenzo Filippini =

Italian footballer

Personal information
- Date of birth: 28 July 1995 (age 31)
- Place of birth: Rome, Italy
- Height: 1.83 m (6 ft 0 in)
- Position: Left back

Team information
- Current team: AC Afragolese 1944
- Number: 23

Youth career
- –2014: Lazio

Senior career*
Years	Team	Apps	(Gls)
2014–2019	Lazio	0	(0)
2014–2015	→ Bari (loan)	10	(0)
2015–2016	→ Pro Vercelli (loan)	14	(0)
2016–2017	→ Cesena (loan)	7	(0)
2017	→ Virtus Entella (loan)	4	(0)
2017–2018	→ Pisa (loan)	35	(1)
2019	→ Cavese (loan)	11	(0)
2019–2020	Gubbio	20	(2)
2020–2021	Triestina	7	(0)
2022	Tritium	12	(0)
2022–2023	Vis Artena	16	(0)
2023–2024	Avezzano	39	(0)
2024–2025	Cassino	23	(2)
2025–	AC Afragolese 1944	24	(1)

International career
2014	Italy U19	2	(0)
- * Club domestic league appearances and goals as of 8 October 2026

Lorenzo Filippini (born 28 July 1995) is an Italian footballer who plays as a left back for Serie D club AC Afragolese 1944.

== Club career ==
=== Lazio ===
==== Loan to Bari ====
On 14 August 2014, Filippini was loaned to Serie B side Bari on a season-long loan deal. On 22 November he made his professional debut in Serie B for Bari as a substitute replacing Stefano Sabelli in the 84th minute of a 2–1 home win over Trapani. On 6 December, Filippini played his first match as a starter, a 1–0 home defeat against Carpi, he was replaced by Giuseppe De Luca in the 78th minute. On 20 December he played his first entire match for Bari, a 1–0 home win over Latina. Filippini ended his season-long loan to Bari with 10 appearances.

==== Loan to Pro Vercelli ====
On 4 August 2015, Filippini was signed by Serie B side Pro Vercelli on a season-long loan deal. On 22 September, he made his Serie B debut in a 2–0 away defeat against Brescia; he played the entire match. Filippini ended his season-long loan to Pro Vercelli with a total of 14 appearances, including 11 as a starter, but in the second part of the season, he played only 2 matches.

==== Loan to Cesena and Virtus Entella ====
On 22 July 2016, Filippini was signed by Serie B club Cesena on a season-long loan deal. On 13 August, he made his debut for Cesena in a 2–0 home win over Ternana in the third round of Coppa Italia. He played the entire match. On 27 September he made his Serie B debut for Cesena as a starter in a 0–0 away draw against Ascoli, he was replaced by Francesco Renzetti in the 72nd minute. On 14 October he played his first entire match for Cesena, a 1–1 home draw against SPAL. In January 2017, Filippini was recalled to Lazio leaving Cesena with only 8 appearances.

On 26 January 2017, Filippini was loaned to Serie B side Virtus Entella on a 6-month loan deal. On 11 February he made his debut for Virtus Entella as a substitute replacing Marco Moscati in the 16th minute of a 3–0 home defeat against SPAL. On 18 February he played his first entire match or Virtus Entella, a 0–0 away draw against Perugia. Filippini ended his 6-month loan to Virtus Entella with only 4 appearances, including 3 as a starter.

==== Loan to Pisa ====
On 25 August 2017, Filippini was loaned to Serie C club Pisa on a season-long loan deal. On 3 September, he made his Serie C debut for Pisa in a 0–0 home draw against Robur Siena. He was replaced by Giulio Favale in the 84th minute. On 10 September he played his first entire match for Pisa, a 0–0 away draw against Monza. On 7 April 2018, Filippini scored his first professional goal in the 50th minute of a 3–2 home win over Pro Piacenza. Filippino ended his season-long loan to Pisa with 35 appearances, 1 goal and 1 assist.

==== Loan to Cavese ====
After not making any appearances for Lazio in the first half of the 2018–19 season, on 31 January 2019 he joined Serie C club Cavese on loan.

=== Serie C ===
On 10 July 2019, Filippini joined Gubbio.

On 5 October 2020, he signed a one-year contract with Triestina.

== Career statistics ==
=== Club ===
As of 28 June 2018

Club	Season	League			Cup		Europe		Other		Total	
Club	Season	League	Apps	Goals	Apps	Goals	Apps	Goals	Apps	Goals	Apps	Goals
Bari (loan)	2014–15	Serie B	10	0	0	0	—		—		10	0
Pro Vercelli (loan)	2015–16	Serie B	14	0	0	0	—		—		14	0
Cesena (loan)	2016–17	Serie B	7	0	1	0	—		—		8	0
Virtus Entella (loan)	2016–17	Serie B	4	0	—		—		—		4	0
Pisa (loan)	2017–18	Serie C	35	1	0	0	—		—		35	1
Career total			70	1	1	0	—		—		71	1

== Honours ==
Lazio Primavera

- Campionato Nazionale Primavera: 2012–13
- Coppa Italia Primavera: 2013–14
