= Davide Lodesani =

Italian footballer (born 1995)

Personal information
- Date of birth: 4 May 1995 (age 31)
- Place of birth: Pavullo nel Frignano, Italy
- Height: 1.81 m (5 ft 11 in)
- Position: Forward

Youth career
- –2014: Sassuolo

Senior career*
Years	Team	Apps	(Gls)
2013–2015	Sassuolo	0	(0)
2014–2015	→ Virtus Castelfranco (loan)	10	(1)
2015–2017	Foggia	3	(0)
2016–2017	→ Melfi (loan)	18	(0)
- * Club domestic league appearances and goals as of 28 December 2017

Davide Lodesani (born 4 May 1995) is an Italian football player.

== Club career ==
In July 2015, he signed for Foggia. He made his Serie C debut for Foggia on 30 April 2016 in a game against Martina Franca.
