= Mario Piccinocchi =

Italian footballer

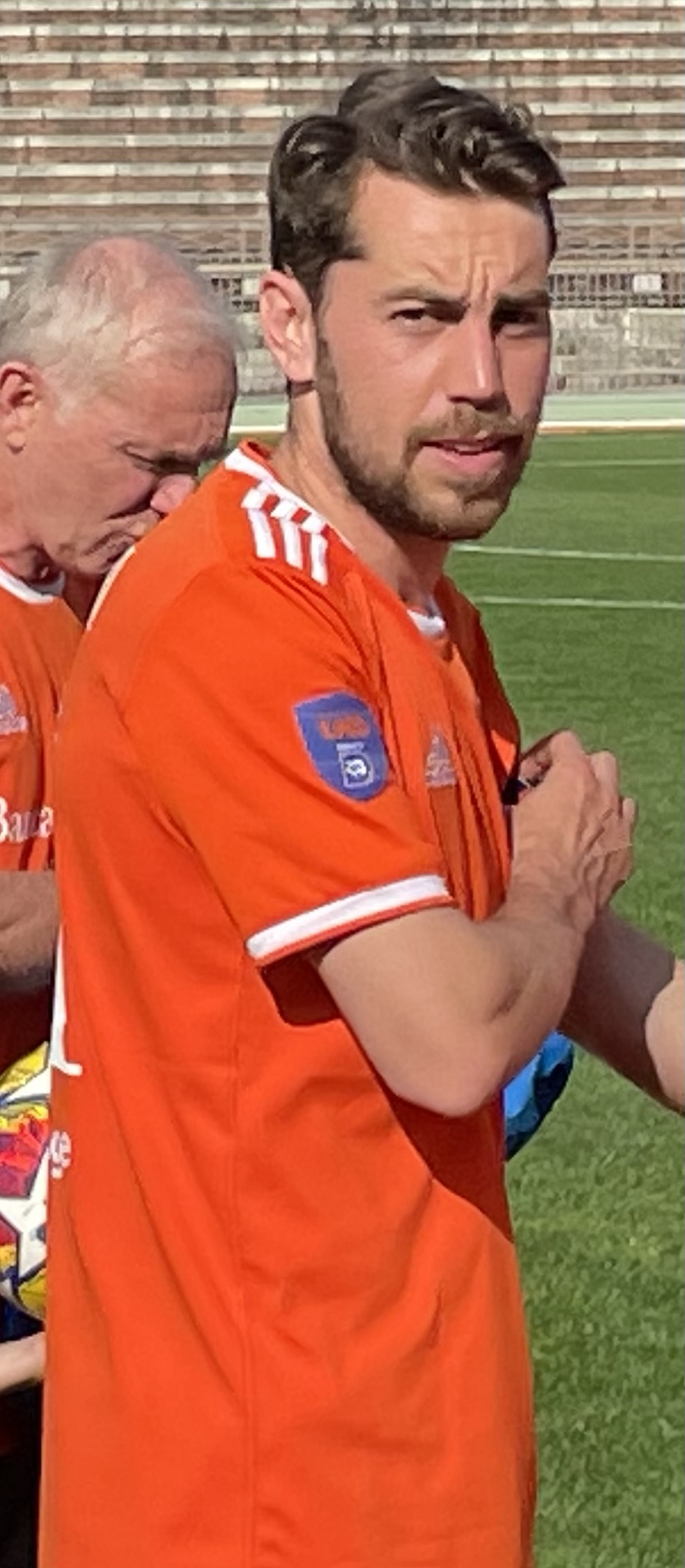

Personal information
- Date of birth: 21 February 1995 (age 31)
- Place of birth: Milan, Italy
- Height: 1.72 m (5 ft 7 1/2 in)
- Position: Midfielder

Youth career
- 2012–2015: AC Milan

Senior career*
Years	Team	Apps	(Gls)
2015–2017	Vicenza	0	(0)
2015–2017	→ Lugano (loan)	54	(2)
2017–2019	Lugano	47	(0)
2019–2020	Ascoli	13	(0)
2021	Seregno	11	(0)
2021–2025	Alcione	77	(2)

International career
2012	Italy U17	7	(0)
2013	Italy U18	2	(0)
2013	Italy U19	5	(0)
- * Club domestic league appearances and goals

Mario Piccinocchi (born 21 February 1995) is an Italian former professional footballer who played as a midfielder.

== Club career ==
On 29 June 2015 he was signed by Vicenza Calcio on a 2-year contract. On 7 July he was farmed to Swiss Super League side FC Lugano.

On 6 July 2016 Piccinocchi signed a new contract with Lugano.

On 15 July 2019, he signed a contract with the Serie B club Ascoli for the term of one year with an option to extend it for 2 more years.

On 4 February 2021, Piccinocchi joined Serie D club Seregno.

On 22 July 2021, he signed a three-year contract with Alcione in Serie D.
