= Paulo Sokoli =

Albanian footballer

Personal information
- Date of birth: 29 March 1995 (age 31)
- Place of birth: Velipojë, Shkodër, Albania
- Position: Defender

Youth career
- –2014: Genoa

Senior career*
Years	Team	Apps	(Gls)
2013–2014	Genoa	0	(0)
2014–2015	Barletta	4	(0)
2015–2016	Monza	23	(2)
2016	FC Cortaillod		
2017	La Chaux-de-Fonds	0	(0)

International career^{‡}
2011–2012	Albania U17	4	(0)
2013	Albania U19	3	(0)
2014–2015	Albania U21	1	(0)
- * Club domestic league appearances and goals as of 10 January 2017 ‡ National team caps and goals as of 8 October 2014

Paulo Sokoli (born 29 March 1995) is an Albanian professional footballer who most recently played as a defender for Swiss club La Chaux-de-Fonds.

== Club career ==
=== Genoa ===
Being a regular starter with primavera team of Genoa C.F.C. he gained entry with the first team in September 2013 as he called up by the coach Fabio Liverani to participate in the 5th game week of the 2013–14 Serie A against Udinese on 28 September 2013. In that match Sokoli remained as an unused substitute for the entire match wearing the 44th shirt number and Udinese won 1–0 scoring with Antonio Di Natale in the 79th minute. He managed to participate with the first team also in the next fixture 4 days later against Napoli and two others during the next year 2014 in January and May, but didn't came in to play in any of these matches.

=== Barletta ===
On 10 July 2014 Sokoli left Genoa to start a professional career at Lega Pro (former Serie C) side S.S. Barletta Calcio. During his first months at Barleta, Sokoli remained with primavera team and involved with the first team on 19 October 2014 by the coach Marco Sesia against Casertana, match finished in the 2–1 loss and Sokoli remained as an unused substitute. He then appeared again at the first team only in the 2015 year in the first match of the year against Messina on 11 January 2015 where he didn't play once again. Then he returned to participate with the first team in March without playing the entire match against Casertana before he made his professional debut on 11 March 2015 against Matera coming on as a substitute in the 85th minute in place of Simone Guarco in a 2–1 away loss.

=== FC La Chaux-de-Fonds ===
On 19 December 2016 Sokoli signed with FC La Chaux-de-Fonds in the Swiss Promotion League, but he left them at the end of the season.

== International career ==
Sokoli was called up for the first time in international level at Albania national under-17 football team by the coach Džemal Mustedanagić to participate in the 2012 UEFA European Under-17 Championship qualifying round in the month October 2011. He managed to play two full 90-minutes matches and helped his team to gain their qualification to the next Elite round by taking the second place in the rank of the group.

Also in the Elite round in March 2012 Sokoli played two full 90-minute matches but Albania U17 eliminated from the tournament finishing in the 3rd place.

Following his good performances with Albania under-17, Sokoli received a call up higher at Albania national under-19 football team by the coach Foto Strakosha, for the 2014 UEFA European Under-19 Championship qualifying round. He played every minute of all 3 matches of the tournament but Albania u19 got eliminated finishing in the last 4th place of the group collecting 2 points.

== Career statistics ==
=== Club ===
As of 11 March 2015

Season	Club	League country	League		League Cup		Europe		Total	
Season	Club	League country	Apps	Goals	Apps	Goals	Apps	Goals	Apps	Goals
2013–14	Genoa	Serie A	0	0	-	-	-	-	0	0
Total			0	0	0	0	0	0	0	0
2014–15	Barletta	Lega Pro	1	0	-	-	-	-	1	0
Total			1	0	0	0	0	0	1	0
Career total			1	0	0	0	0	0	1	0
