= Riccardo Maciucca =

Italian footballer

Personal information
- Date of birth: 24 October 1996 (age 30)
- Place of birth: Cisterna di Latina, Italy
- Height: 1.79 m (5 ft 10 in)
- Position: Defender

Senior career*
Years	Team	Apps	(Gls)
2015–2017	Latina	4	(0)
2015–2016	→ Grosseto (loan)	25	(0)
2017–2018	Matera	6	(0)
2018–2019	Vibonese	23	(0)
- * Club domestic league appearances and goals as of 4 May 2019

Riccardo Maciucca (born 24 October 1996) is an Italian footballer who plays as a defender.

== Professional career ==
Maciucca began his playing career on for Grosseto, on loan from Latina, in the 2015/16 season. Maciucca made his professional debut for Latina in a Serie B 1-0 win over Virtus Entella on 25 April 2017.

Maciucca joined Vibonese on 21 August 2018.
