= Lorenzo Bardini =

Italian footballer (born 1996)

Personal information
- Date of birth: 12 April 1996 (age 30)
- Place of birth: Livorno, Italy
- Height: 1.90 m (6 ft 3 in)
- Position: Goalkeeper

Team information
- Current team: Vastese

Youth career
- –2015: Fiorentina

Senior career*
Years	Team	Apps	(Gls)
2015–2016	Fiorentina	0	(0)
2015–2016	→ Prato (loan)	4	(0)
2016–2018	Cesena	1	(0)
2017–2018	→ Monopoli (loan)	23	(0)
2019	Catania	1	(0)
2019–	Vastese	8	(0)

International career
2012	Italy U-16	3	(0)
- * Club domestic league appearances and goals as of 21:16, 24 November 2019 (UTC)

Lorenzo Bardini (born 12 April 1996) is an Italian football player. He plays for Vastese.

== Club career ==
He made his Serie C debut for Prato on 31 January 2016 in a game against Robur Siena.

On 26 February 2019, he signed with Catania.

On 16 July 2019 he joined Serie D club Vastese.
