= Antonio Lukanović =

Croatian footballer

Personal information
- Date of birth: 6 March 1998 (age 28)
- Place of birth: Rijeka, Croatia
- Height: 1.90 m (6 ft 3 in)
- Position: Forward

Team information
- Current team: Bassano 1903

Youth career
- 2010–2014: Rijeka
- 2014–2015: Parma
- 2015–2016: Novara

Senior career*
Years	Team	Apps	(Gls)
2016–2018	Novara	20	(1)
2017	→ Catanzaro (loan)	7	(1)
2018–2020	Olimpija Ljubljana	3	(0)
2019–2020	→ Jadran Dekani (loan)	13	(3)
2020–2021	Montebelluna	29	(5)
2021	Campodarsego		(0)
2022-	Bassano 1903		(15)
- * Club domestic league appearances and goals as of 29 July 2020

Antonio Lukanović (born 6 March 1998) is a Croatian football player who plays as a forward for Italian 5th tier-outfit Bassano 1903.

== Club career ==
He made his professional debut in the Serie B for Novara on 4 September 2016 in a game against Pisa. In 2020 he joined Montebelluna and he moved to Campodarsego in 2021. He signed up with at the last day of 2021.
