= Giuliano Regolanti =

Italian footballer

Personal information
- Date of birth: 26 July 1994 (age 32)
- Place of birth: Anzio, Italy
- Height: 1.83 m (6 ft 0 in)
- Position: Forward

Team information
- Current team: Cuneo

Youth career
- Frosinone

Senior career*
Years	Team	Apps	(Gls)
2013–2016	Frosinone	0	(0)
2013–2014	→ Fondi (loan)	31	(10)
2014–2015	→ Gubbio (loan)	36	(8)
2015–2016	→ Matera (loan)	9	(0)
2016	→ Prato (loan)	14	(3)
2016–2017	Latina	5	(1)
2017	Paganese	19	(2)
2018	Arezzo	8	(0)
2018	Montegiorgio Calcio 1954	10	(2)
2018–2019	ASD Lavinio Campoverde		
2022	Aprilia		
2022–2023	Anzio		
2023	Sangiovannese	14	(4)
2024	Unipomezia Virtus		
2024–2025	Valenzana		
2025–	Cuneo		
- * Club domestic league appearances and goals as of 23 October 2026

Giuliano Regolanti (born 26 July 1994) is an Italian footballer who plays as a forward for Cuneo.

== Club career ==
He made his professional debut in the Lega Pro for Gubbio on 30 August 2014 in a game against L'Aquila.
