= Davide Savi =

Italian footballer (born 1995)

Personal information
- Date of birth: 14 November 1995 (age 30)
- Place of birth: Treviglio, Italy
- Height: 1.90 m (6 ft 3 in)
- Position: Centre back

Team information
- Current team: USD Pagazzanese

Youth career
- –2014: Atalanta

Senior career*
Years	Team	Apps	(Gls)
2014–2015	Atalanta	0	(0)
2014–2015	→ FeralpiSalò (loan)	2	(0)
2015–2019	Chievo Verona	0	(0)
2015–2016	→ Ischia (loan)	10	(0)
2016–2018	→ Renate (loan)	7	(0)
2018–2019	→ Mosta (loan)	0	(0)
2019	Pontisola	3	(0)
2019–	USD Pagazzanese		
- * Club domestic league appearances and goals as of 18:40, 6 April 2020 (UTC)

Davide Savi (born 14 November 1995) is an Italian football player. He plays for USD Pagazzanese.

== Club career ==
He made his Serie C debut for FeralpiSalò on 20 December 2014 in a game against Lumezzane.

For the 2019–20 season, he joined Serie D club Pontisola. Savi then moved to USD Pagazzanese in the Prima Categoria in December 2019.
