= Mattia Lombardo =

Italian footballer (born 1995)

Personal information
- Date of birth: 14 February 1995 (age 31)
- Place of birth: Genoa, Italy
- Height: 1.84 m (6 ft 0 in)
- Position: Midfielder

Team information
- Current team: Tau Calcio Altopascio

Youth career
- –2014: Sampdoria

Senior career*
Years	Team	Apps	(Gls)
2014–2015	Sampdoria	1	(0)
2014–2015	→ Cremonese (loan)	7	(0)
2015	→ Pontedera (loan)	8	(0)
2015–2016	Pro Vercelli	0	(0)
2016	Mantova	0	(0)
2016–2018	Reggiana	27	(1)
2018–2019	Lucchese	41	(8)
2019–2020	Siena	13	(1)
2020–2021	Monopoli	10	(1)
2021	Sambenedettese	6	(1)
2021–2022	Teramo	16	(0)
2022–2023	Torres	16	(1)
2023–	Tau Calcio Altopascio	1	(0)
- * Club domestic league appearances and goals as of 8 October 2023

Mattia Lombardo (born 14 February 1995) is an Italian footballer who plays as a midfielder for Serie D club Tau Calcio Altopascio. He is the son of former Italy international Attilio Lombardo.

== Club career ==
Lombardo made his professional debut with Sampdoria on 13 April 2014 in the Serie A. He substituted Angelo Palombo after 84 minutes in a 0–4 home defeat against Inter Milan.

On 18 July 2014, he was signed by Cremonese. On 2 February 2015, he was signed by Pontedera.

Lombardo was released by Sampdoria on 1 July 2015.

In July 2015 he moved to Pro Vercelli; in February 2016 he was transferred to Mantova. Ahead of the 2016–17 season he joined Reggiana.

On 24 October 2019 he signed with Siena until 30 June 2020 with a renewal option.

On 7 October 2020, he joined Monopoli on a one-year contract.

On 1 February 2021, he moved to Sambenedettese on a 1.5-year contract.

On 22 October 2021, he signed with Teramo.
