= 2016–17 Virtus Entella season =

Virtus Entella
2016–17 season
- Chairman: Antonio Gozzi
- Manager: Alfredo Aglietti
- Stadium: Stadio Comunale
- Serie B: 12th

== Current squad ==
As of 4 January 2017

Note: Flags indicate national team as defined under FIFA eligibility rules; some limited exceptions apply. Players may hold more than one non-FIFA nationality.

No.	Pos.	Nation	Player
1	GK	ITA	Andrea Paroni
3	DF	MLI	Cheick Keita
4	DF	ITA	Francesco Belli
5	DF	ITA	Luca Ceccarelli
6	MF	ITA	Fabio Gerli
7	MF	POR	Pedro Ferreira
8	MF	ITA	Michele Troiano (captain)
9	FW	ITA	Francesco Caputo
10	FW	ITA	Aniello Cutolo
11	MF	ITA	Simone Palermo
12	GK	TUN	Aladin Ayoub
13	DF	ITA	Simone Benedetti
14	MF	ITA	Luca Tremolada
15	MF	ITA	Michele Pellizzer

No.	Pos.	Nation	Player
17	MF	ITA	Manuel Di Paola
18	MF	MAR	Abderrazzak Jadid
19	DF	ITA	Simone Iacoponi
20	FW	ITA	Davide Diaw
22	GK	ITA	Alessandro Iacobucci
23	DF	ITA	Simone Sini
25	FW	POR	Dany Mota
26	FW	ITA	Gaetano Masucci
27	MF	CZE	Jan Havlena
28	DF	SEN	Joel Baraye
29	MF	FRA	Najib Ammari
30	MF	ITA	Marco Moscati (on loan from Livorno)
32	FW	ITA	Giacomo Beretta (on loan from Milan)

== Out on loan ==
Note: Flags indicate national team as defined under FIFA eligibility rules; some limited exceptions apply. Players may hold more than one non-FIFA nationality.

No.	Pos.	Nation	Player
—	GK	BRA	Joao Zanotti (at Montebelluna until 30 June 2017)
—	GK	ITA	Daniele Borra (at Arezzo until 30 June 2017)
—	DF	ITA	Stefano Lanini (at Alma Juventus Fano until 30 June 2017)
—	DF	ITA	Luca Oneto (at Santarcangelo until 30 June 2017)
—	DF	ITA	Valerio Zigrossi (at Alma Juventus Fano until 30 June 2017)

No.	Pos.	Nation	Player
—	MF	ITA	Paolo Valagussa (at A.S. Gubbio 1910 until 30 June 2017)
—	MF	ITA	Antonio Cardore (at Viterbese until 30 June 2017)
—	MF	ESP	Héctor Otín (at Reggiana until 30 June 2017)
—	FW	ITA	Stefano Moreo (at Venezia until 30 June 2017)

== Transfers ==
=== In ===
Pos.	Player	Age	Moving from	Fee	Notes	Source
DF	(Italy) Michele Pellizzer	36	(Italy) Cittadella	270k €		
DF	(Italy) Simone Benedetti	34	(Italy) Cagliari			
DF	(Senegal) Joel Baraye	29	(Italy) Brescia U19			
MF	(Czech Republic) Jan Havlena	27	U19	Free		
MF	(France) Najib Ammari	34	(Italy) Latina			
MF	(Italy) Luca Tremolada	34	(Italy) Arezzo	Free		
FW	(Portugal) Dany Mota	28	U19	Free		
FW	(Italy) Davide Diaw	34	(Italy) Tamai			
FW	(Italy) Francesco Caputo	38	(Italy) Bari			

=== Out ===
Pos.	Player	Age	Moving to	Fee	Notes	Source
GK	(Netherlands) Maarten van der Want	31	(Italy) Olbia			
DF	(Italy) Lorenzo Negro	28	(Italy) Matelica	Free	^{After joining Matelica he was released.}	
DF	(Italy) Luca Cecchini	23	(Italy) Lucchese			
DF	(Italy) Antony Viscardi	29	(Italy) Fezzanese	Free		
DF	(Mali) Cheick Keita	30	(England) Birmingham	£1.5m		
MF	(Italy) Gennaro Volpe	45	End of career			
MF	(Italy) Lorenzo Staiti	39	(Italy) Feralpisalò	Free		
MF	(Italy) Vittorio Argeri	31	(Italy) Goliardicapolis	Free		
FW	(Italy) Francesco Zottino	29	(Italy) Cordenons	Free		

== Competitions ==
=== League table ===
Pos	Team	Pld	W	D	L	GF	GA	GD	Pts
9	Novara	42	15	11	16	48	50	−2	56
10	Salernitana	42	13	15	14	44	44	0	54 (Note: Salernitana is ahead of Virtus Entella on head-to-head points: Salernitana 1–1 Virtus Entella, Virtus Entella 0–1 Salernitana.)
11	Virtus Entella	42	13	15	14	54	51	+3	54
12	Bari	42	13	14	15	39	44	−5	53 (Note: Bari is ahead of Cesena on head-to-head points: Bari 2–1 Cesena, Cesena 1–1 Bari.)
13	Cesena	42	12	17	13	51	48	+3	53

Source: Lega Serie B
Rules for classification: 1) Points; 2) Head-to-head points; 3) Head-to-head goal difference; 4) Goal difference; 5) Goals scored; 6) Draw.
