= Aminata =

Aminata is a feminine given name. People with this name include:

- Aminata Aidara (born 1984), Italian-Senegalese journalist, short story writer and novelist
- Aminata Barrow (born 2004), Gambian swimmer
- Aminata Camara (footballer) (born 2003), Guinean footballer
- Aminata Camara (hurdler) (born 1973), Malian retired hurdler
- Aminata Coulibaly (born 1989), French retired volleyball player
- Aminata Diallo (born 1995), French footballer
- Aminata Diallo Glez (born 1972), Burkinabé filmmaker, actor, and producer
- Aminata Diaw (1959–2017), Senegalese academic and political philosopher
- Aminata Fall (basketball) (born 1991), Senegalese basketball player
- Aminata Gueye (born 2002), French basketball player
- Aminata Haidara (born 1997), Ivorian footballer
- Aminata Kabba (born 1994), stage name Kabba, British singer and songwriter
- Aminata Konaté (basketball) (born 1990), French basketball player
- Aminata Konaté (sprinter) (born 1968), Guinean sprinter
- Aminata Koné, French lawyer and activist of Ivorian descent
- Aminata Maïga Ka (born 1940), Senegalese writer
- Aminata Mbengue Ndiaye (fl. 2012–present), Senegalese politician and former basketball player, government minister and member of the Pan-African Parliament
- Aminata Moseka, a name adopted by Abbey Lincoln (1930–2010), American jazz vocalist, songwriter and actress
- Aminata Namasia (born 1993), politician in the Democratic Republic of the Congo
- Aminata Nar Diop (born 1983), Senegalese basketball player
- Aminata Sana Congo (born 1974), Burkina Faso politician and diplomat, ambassador to Taiwan and former Minister of Development of the Digital Economy and the Posts
- Aminata Savadogo (born 1993), Latvian singer
- Aminata Sininta (born 1985), Malian basketball player
- Aminata Sow Fall (born 1941), Senegalese-born author
- Aminata Boureima Takoubakoyé (born 1979), Nigerien economist and politician
- Aminata Tall (born 1949), Senegalese politician and government minister
- Aminata Touré (Senegalese politician) (born 1962), former Prime Minister of Senegal (2013–2014) and Justice Minister (2012–2013)
- Aminata Touré (German politician) (born 1992)
- Aminata Touré (Guinean politician) (1952–2022)
- Aminata Traoré (author) (born 1947), Malian politician
- Aminata Traoré (taekwondo) (born 1999), Ivorian taekwondo practitioner
- Aminata Zerbo-Sabané (born 1979), Ivorian-born computer scientist, educator and Burkinabe politician, Minister of Digital Transition, Posts, and Electronic Communications
