= 2022–23 Virtus Entella season =

Virtus Entella
2022–23 season
- Chairman: Antonio Gozzi
- Manager: Gennaro Volpe
- Stadium: Stadio Comunale
- Serie C: 2nd
- Coppa Italia Serie C: Semi-finals

The 2022–23 Virtus Entella season is the club's 109th season in existence and its second consecutive season in the third division of Italian football. In addition to the domestic league, Virtus Entella are participating in this season's edition of the Coppa Italia Serie C. The season covers the period from 1 July 2022 to 30 June 2023.

== Players ==
=== First-team squad ===
As of 1 February 2023.

Note: Flags indicate national team as defined under FIFA eligibility rules; some limited exceptions apply. Players may hold more than one non-FIFA nationality.

No.	Pos.	Nation	Player
1	GK	ITA	Andrea Paroni
3	DF	ITA	Luca Barlocco
4	DF	ITA	Paolo Coly
8	MF	ITA	Giacomo Tomaselli
9	MF	URU	Gastón Ramírez
10	FW	ITA	Luca Clemenza
11	DF	ITA	Giulio Favale
13	DF	ITA	Davide Zappella
14	MF	ITA	Andrea Corbari
15	DF	ITA	Michele Pellizzer
16	MF	ITA	Joshua Tenkorang (on loan from Cremonese)
17	MF	ITA	Simone Tascone
18	FW	ITA	Alessandro Faggioli
19	DF	ITA	Marco Chiosa

No.	Pos.	Nation	Player
20	FW	ITA	Leonardo Morosini
21	MF	ALB	Armand Rada
22	GK	ITA	Victor De Lucia
23	MF	ITA	Andrea Paolucci
24	GK	ITA	Daniele Borra
26	DF	ITA	Claudio Manzi
28	DF	ITA	Stefano Reali
30	FW	ITA	Luca Zamparo
33	FW	ALB	Silvio Merkaj
36	DF	CAN	Kosovar Sadiki
70	MF	ITA	Lorenzo Meazzi
77	DF	ITA	Luca Parodi
88	MF	GRE	Antonis Siatounis

=== Out on loan ===
Note: Flags indicate national team as defined under FIFA eligibility rules; some limited exceptions apply. Players may hold more than one non-FIFA nationality.

No.	Pos.	Nation	Player
—	GK	ITA	Pietro Balducci (at Carpi until 30 June 2023)
—	GK	LTU	Ovidijus Šiaulys (at Virtus Verona until 30 June 2023)
—	DF	ITA	Federico Bonini (at Gubbio until 30 June 2023)
—	DF	ITA	Andrea Bruno (at Livorno until 30 June 2023)

No.	Pos.	Nation	Player
—	MF	ITA	Daniele Dessena (at Olbia until 30 June 2023, obligation to buy)
—	MF	GRE	Ilias Koutsoupias (at Benevento until 30 June 2023, obligation to buy)
—	MF	ITA	Jacopo Lipani (at Monterosi until 30 June 2023)
—	MF	ITA	Federico Macca (at Virtus Francavilla until 30 June 2023)

== Pre-season and friendlies ==
Win Draw Loss Fixtures

August 2022 Friendly	(Italy)	v	(Italy) Virtus Entella
CEST (UTC+2)

== Competitions ==
=== Overview ===
Competition	First match	Last match	Starting round	Final position	Record							
Competition	First match	Last match	Starting round	Final position	Pld	W	D	L	GF	GA	GD	Win %
Serie C	4 September 2022	May 2023	Matchday 1		0	0	0	0	0	0	+0	—
Coppa Italia Serie C	5 October 2022	15 February 2023	First round	Semi-finals	6	3	2	1	10	8	+2	50.00
Total					6	3	2	1	10	8	+2	50.00

Last updated: March 2023
Source: [ Soccerway]

=== Serie C ===
==== League table ====
Pos	Team	Pld	W	D	L	GF	GA	GD	Pts	Qualification
1	Reggiana (C, P)	38	24	9	5	63	27	+36	81	Promotion to Serie B. Qualification for the Supercoppa di Serie C
2	Cesena	38	23	10	5	66	24	+42	79 (Note: Cesena ahead of Virtus Entella due to head-to-head matches: ENT-CES 0-0; CES-ENT 4-0)	Qualification for the promotion play-offs national phase
3	Virtus Entella	38	23	10	5	60	31	+29	79	Qualification for the promotion play-offs national phase
4	Carrarese	38	18	8	12	51	42	+9	62	Qualification for the promotion play-offs group phase
5	Gubbio	38	17	10	11	50	34	+16	61	Qualification for the promotion play-offs group phase

Updated to match(es) played on 6 April 2023. Source: Lega Pro, Soccerway (in English)
Rules for classification: 1) Points; 2) Head-to-head points; 3) Head-to-head goal difference; 4) Goal difference; 5) Goals scored; 6) Lower goals against; 7) Wins; 8) Lower losses; 9) Away wins; 10) Lower home losses.
(C) Champions; (P) Promoted

==== Results summary ====
Overall								Home						Away					
Pld	W	D	L	GF	GA	GD	Pts	W	D	L	GF	GA	GD	W	D	L	GF	GA	GD
38	23	9	6	61	33	+28	78	11	6	2	32	14	+18	12	3	4	29	19	+10

==== Results by round ====
Round	1
Ground	
Result	
Position	

Updated to match(es) played on March 2023. Source:
A = Away; H = Home; W = Win; D = Draw; L = Loss

==== Matches ====
The league fixtures were announced on 26 August 2022.

September 2022	Virtus Entella	–
CET (UTC+1)

=== Coppa Italia Serie C ===
5 October 2022 First round	Virtus Entella	1–1 (5–4 p)	Carrarese	Chiavari
CET (UTC+1)				Stadium: Stadio Comunale

1 November 2022 Second round	Virtus Entella	1–0	Montevarchi Calcio	Chiavari
CET (UTC+1)				Stadium: Stadio Comunale

17 November 2022 Round of 16	Virtus Entella	1–1 (4–2 p)	Lucchese	Chiavari
CET (UTC+1)				Stadium: Stadio Comunale

7 December 2022 Quarter-finals	Virtus Entella	5–2	Renate	Chiavari
CET (UTC+1)				Stadium: Stadio Comunale

18 January 2023 Semi-finals; First leg	Virtus Entella	1–0	Vicenza	Chiavari
CET (UTC+1)				Stadium: Stadio Comunale

15 February 2023 Semi-finals; Second leg	Vicenza	4–1 (4–2 agg.)	Virtus Entella
CET (UTC+1)
