= Senegalese people in Argentina =

Senegalese Argentines
Sénégalais argentins (Wolof) Senegalés-argentinos (Spanish)
- (Argentina) (Senegal)
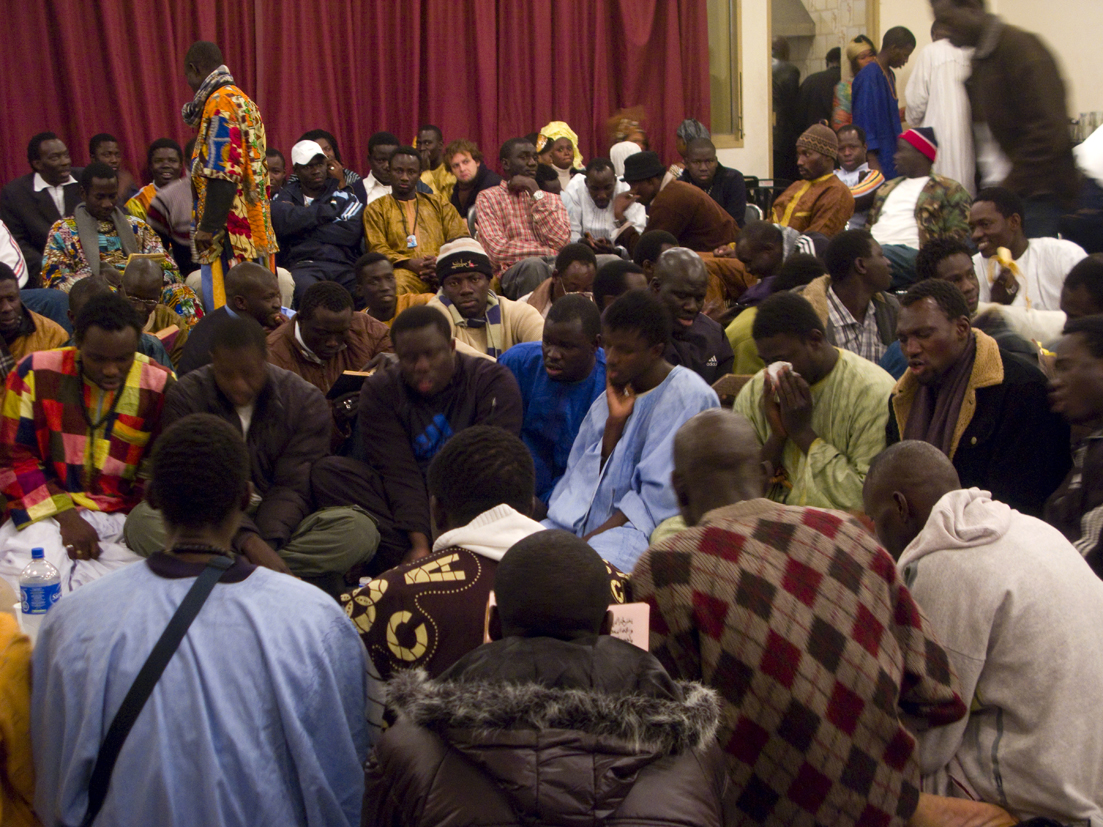
- Senegalese people at the King Fahd Islamic Cultural Center in Buenos Aires

Total population
- 1,120 (by birth, 2022); 2,500 (by ancestry, 2015); 0.005% of the Argentine population

Regions with significant populations
- Buenos Aires • La Plata

Languages
- Majority: Wolof · French; Minority: Spanish · Others

Religion
- Islam (Sunnism)

Related ethnic groups
- Senegalese people Senegalese people in France · Senegalese people in Italy · Senegalese Americans

There is a community of Senegalese living in Argentina consisting of immigrants and expatriates from Senegal as well as their local born descendants. This migratory phenomenon has gained certain strength and importance during the last decade of the 20th century and the first decades of the 21st century, making it a relatively new migratory current in the country.

== Overview ==
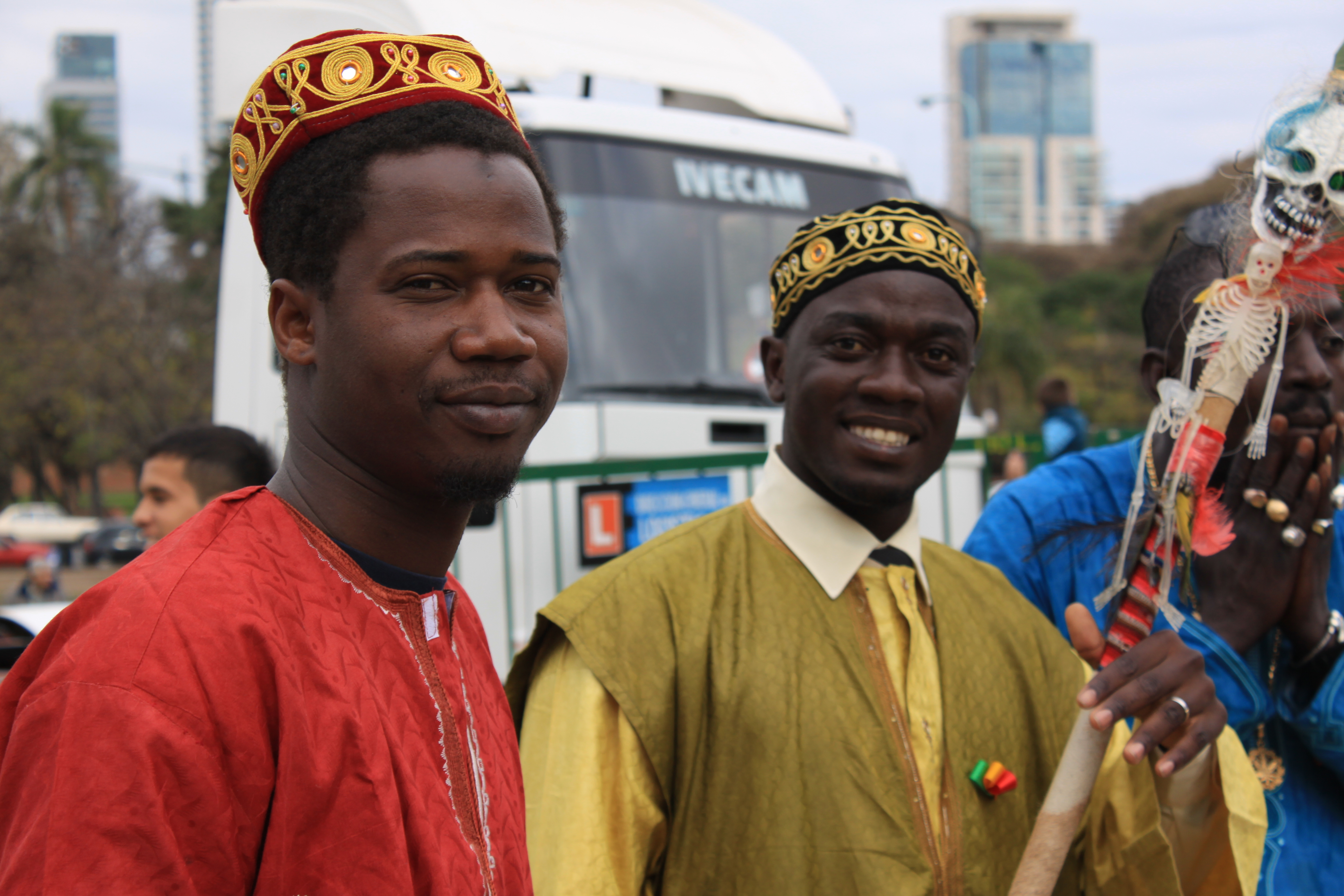
Senegalese immigrants during Immigrants' Day in Buenos Aires.

During the 2000s, many Senegalese migrants travelled first to Brazil, where obtaining an entry visa was more accessible, and subsequently entered Argentina by land. At the time, the absence of an Argentine diplomatic representation in Senegal made direct legal entry difficult. Migrants generally relied on relatives, acquaintances and established community members for initial accommodation, employment and information.

Early research identified two principal networks. A smaller Jola network from southern Senegal was associated with salaried employment, restaurants, construction and artistic work. A larger Wolof and Mouride network, originating principally in northern Senegal, became closely associated with small-scale commerce and street vending.

The area around Once, in the neighbourhood of Balvanera, became the community's most visible residential and commercial centre. It was sometimes described as a "Little Dakar" because of its Senegalese-run shops, shared accommodation and concentration of street vendors. Smaller early concentrations were also recorded in San Telmo. Senegalese residents later settled or worked in municipalities including Morón, Avellaneda, Lomas de Zamora and Florencio Varela.

== Culture and community organization ==
Most Senegalese migrants in Buenos Aires are Muslim, particularly members of the Mouride and Tijani Sufi orders. Religious and mutual-aid associations (dahiras) assist newcomers with accommodation, employment and administrative matters, in addition to organising prayer and religious instruction.

The Grand Magal of Touba, the principal Mouride religious festival, is celebrated annually in Buenos Aires. Local observances include prayer, communal meals, music and traditional dance. Larger religious gatherings have been held in Islamic centres and mosques in the city.

The Asociación de Residentes Senegaleses en Argentina was founded in 2007 and obtained legal recognition in 2010. It was established to represent migrants before Argentine and Senegalese authorities and included members from different ethnic and religious backgrounds. In the wider Buenos Aires Province, the Asociación Senegalesa de La Plata has participated in migrant-rights workshops and campaigns concerning street vending, documentation and institutional violence.

Wolof is widely spoken within the community, while some migrants also speak French or languages associated with particular regions of Senegal. Spanish is generally learned after arrival through work, community contacts and language courses. Senegalese cultural activities in Buenos Aires include classes and performances of sabar. Classes have been held in Villa Crespo and in public spaces including Parque Centenario, Saavedra and Belgrano. Senegalese cuisine is also prepared within the community, including thieboudienne,.

== Demographics ==
Population pyramid of Senegalese immigrants in 2022.

According to the 2022 census, there were 1,120 Senegalese in Argentina, making them the largest African community, almost all of them men. A 2015 study numbered them at 2,500, including Argentine-born descendants of Senegalese nationals; the vast majority of these lived as a minority in Buenos Aires, between Comuna 1 and Comuna 3, being in these places around 2% of the population. However, reports note there is no precise figure for the population. An academic study published in 2011 cited a community estimate of approximately 3,000 Senegalese residents in Argentina, while a 2022 report estimated the national population at between 4,000 and 5,000, most of whom lived in the capital and Greater Buenos Aires.

Informal street vending has been a prominent, although not universal, source of employment. Common products have included jewellery, watches, clothing and mobile-phone accessories acquired from wholesalers in Argentina or Brazil. Established traders have also operated shops in commercial galleries in Once, the Microcentro and Palermo. Other community members have worked in restaurants, construction, information technology, dance and music. New arrivals have often entered commerce through established community networks, which may provide merchandise on credit, instruction in Spanish and accompaniment by more experienced vendors. Income is frequently used to support relatives in Senegal through remittances, while telephone and internet communication maintains close connections with families and religious institutions in the country of origin.

== Discrimination and policing ==
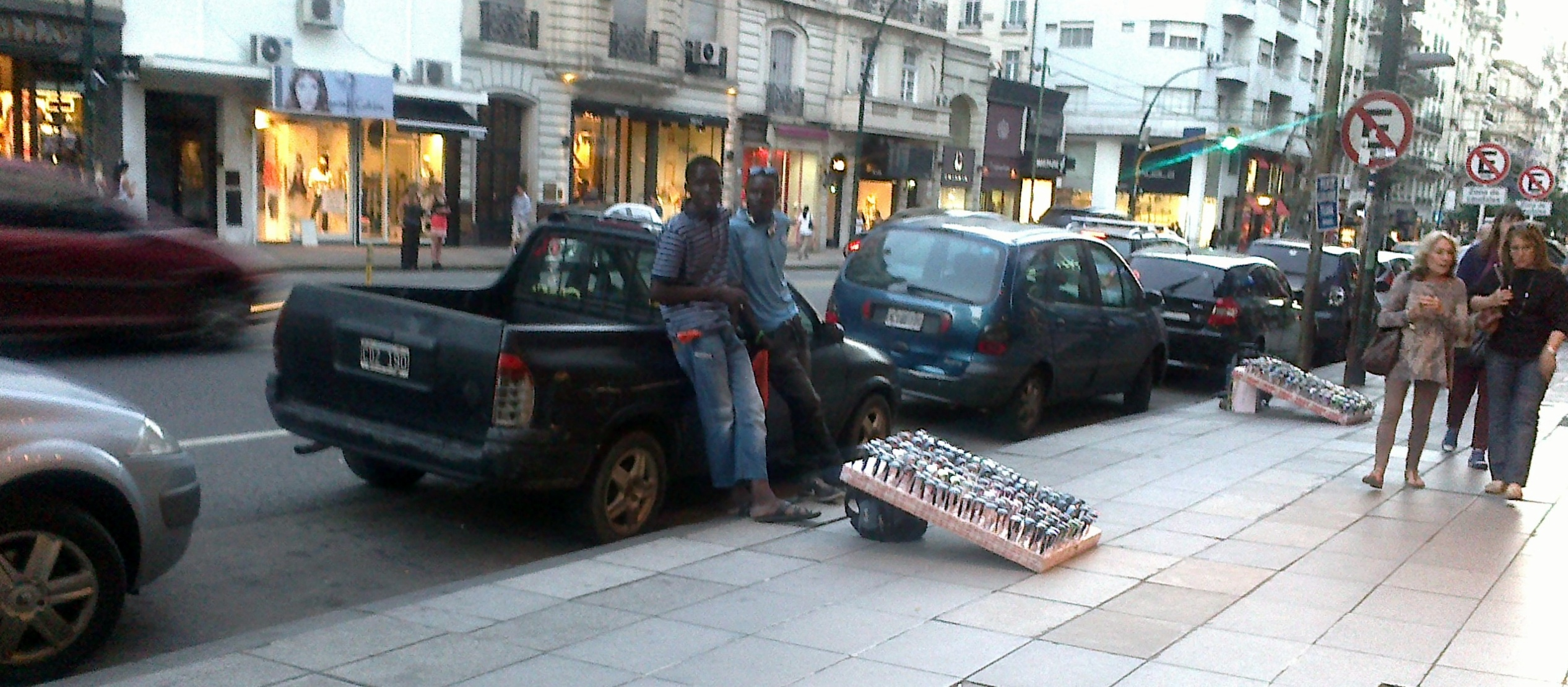
Senegalese vendors in Buenos Aires.

The community's reliance on street commerce has resulted in recurring conflicts with municipal authorities, as unlicensed street vending is restricted in Buenos Aires and several surrounding municipalities. Academic studies and journalistic reports have documented merchandise confiscations, racial discrimination, police harassment and violent enforcement operations affecting Senegalese vendors, particularly in Once, Flores and Constitución.

Senegalese vendors have responded through demonstrations, community assemblies, legal assistance and cooperation with migrant and human-rights organisations. During the COVID-19 pandemic, restrictions on public activity deprived many street vendors of their income. Community networks organised food distribution and created small cooperative projects to support residents who were unable to work or send remittances to Senegal.

== See also ==
- Senegal
- Islam in Argentina
- Afro-Argentines
- Immigration to Argentina
