= Senegalese people in Italy =

Senegalese immigrant community in Italy

Senegalese in Italy
Total population
- 112,598 (2023)

Regions with significant populations
- Senegal

Languages
- Wolof, French, Italian, Pulaar

Religion
- Islam (Sunni)

Related ethnic groups
- Senegalese diaspora

The presence of Senegalese people in Italy dates back to the 1980s.

In 2014 there were 94,030 legally resident immigrants from Senegal in Italy, an increase from 59,857 in 2006. Over time, the number of Senegalese citizens in Italy has grown steadily, rising from 46,478 in 2004 to 110,763 registered residents in 2022, representing a percentage increase of 138%. The diaspora in Italy consists of 81,345 men and 29,418 women, a ratio of approximately 3:1.

As of 2014, the three cities with the largest Senegalese populations in Italy were Milan, Rome, and Genoa.

In 2022, about 30% of all Senegalese legally residing in Italy were concentrated in Lombardy (32,852).

The provinces with the highest numbers of Senegalese residents were Bergamo (9,350), Brescia (6,716), and Milan (6,434).

== Religious brotherhoods ==
Approximately 75% of immigrants in Italy originating from the African continent belong to the Muride brotherhood and maintain strong ties to their cultural roots. Accordingly, about two-thirds of the nearly thirty thousand Senegalese (including both documented and undocumented migrants) present in Italy are affiliated with the Muridiyya. Major centers in Italy are located in Pontevico and Bovezzo in the province of Brescia, and in Zingonia in the province of Bergamo. A smaller portion of Senegalese residents in Italy belong to the Tijaniyya brotherhood.

Group life and festive ritual gatherings highlight their attachment to traditional customs and culture. Marabouts regularly visit Italy to collect offerings and bestow blessings on the faithful, thereby strengthening ties with their homeland. Some migrants are able to return to Touba during the Grand Magal, the major annual pilgrimage commemorating Ahmadou Bamba.

== Notable Senegaleses in Italy ==
Notable Senegalese people based in Italy or Italian-born with Senegalese heritage:

- Aminata Aidara, journalist, short story writer and novelist
- Cheikh Tidiane Gaye, novelist
- Jenny B, singer
- Edrissa Sanneh, former DJ and sports journalist
- Abramo Canka, professional basketball player
- Valentina Diouf, professional volleyball player
- Davide Diaw, professional football player
- Alfred Gomis, professional footballer
- Lys Gomis, footballer
- Mamadou Coulibaly, footballer
- Maurice Gomis, footballer
- Mouhamed Ali Ndiaye, professional boxer
- Cher Ndour, footballer
- Welle Ossou, footballer
- Khaby Lame, social media personality
- Obama, drag queen
- Dame Sarr, basketball player

== See also ==
- Nigerian people in Italy

== Bibliography ==
- Schmidt di Friedberg, Ottavia (1994). Islam, solidarietà e lavoro. I muridi senegalesi in Italia [Islam, Solidarity, and Work: Senegalese Murids in Italy] (in Italian). Turin: Edizioni della Fondazione Giovanni Agnelli.
- Guolo, Renzo (2001). "L'islam nascosto. Adattamento e trasformazione della religiosità nella confraternita senegalese muride in Italia" [Hidden Islam: Adaptation and Transformation of Religious Life in the Senegalese Murid Brotherhood in Italy]. Sociologia Urbana e Rurale (in Italian) (64–65).
- CESNUR. "Un sufismo degli immigrati: i Muridi e i Layennes" [A Sufism of Immigrants: The Murids and the Layennes] (in Italian).
- Casella Paltrinieri, Anna (2006). Un futuro in gioco: tra muridi senegalesi e comunità italiana [A Future at Stake: Between Senegalese Murids and the Italian Community] (in Italian). FrancoAngeli.
- Gasparetti, Fedora (2005). Vengo da Touba, sono muride e lavoro a Torino [I Come from Touba, I Am Murid, and I Work in Turin] (Master’s thesis) (in Italian).
