= Davide Diaw =

Italian footballer (born 1992)

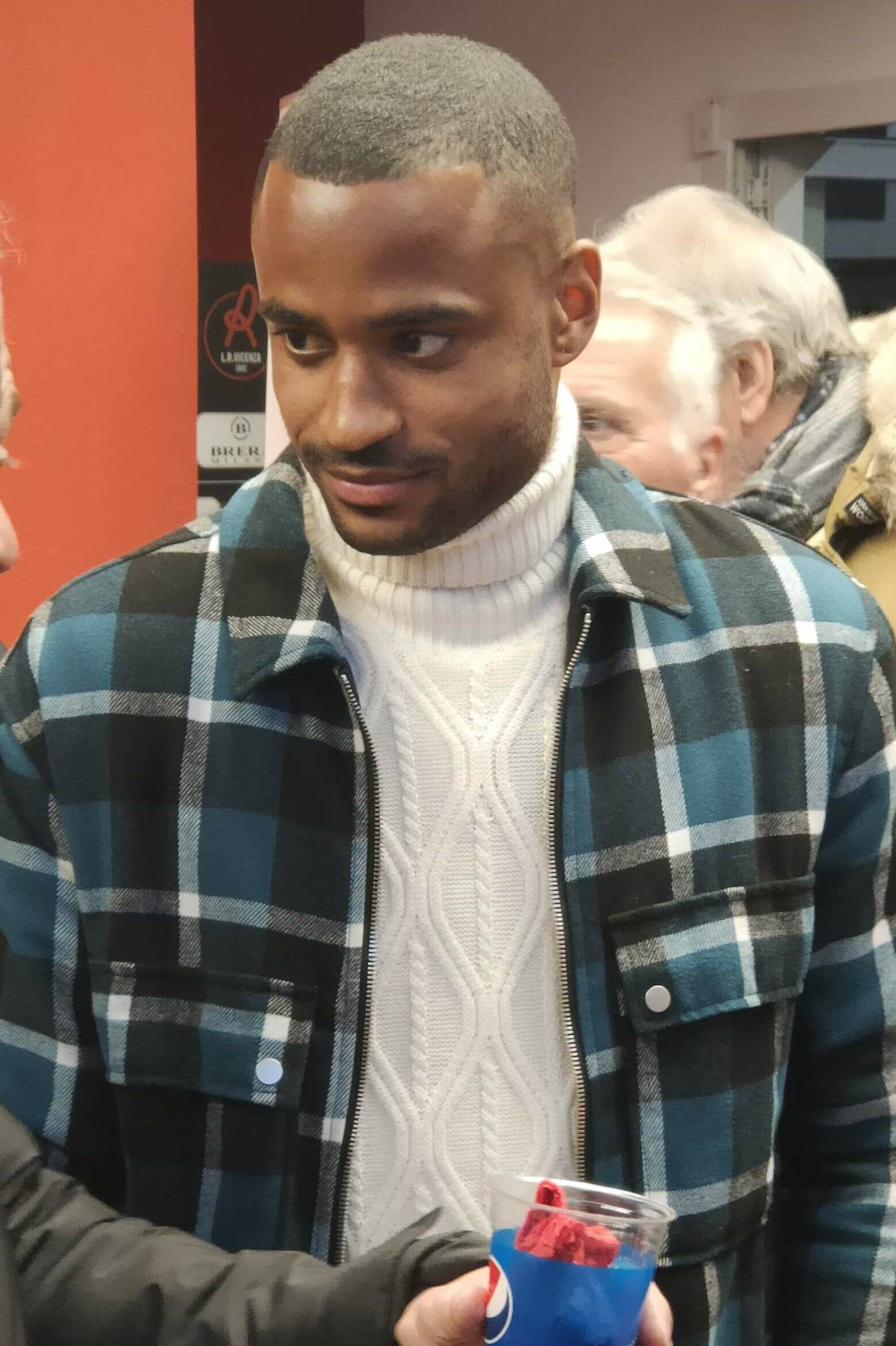
- Diaw in 2022

Personal information
- Full name: Davide Djily Diaw
- Date of birth: 6 January 1992 (age 34)
- Place of birth: Cividale del Friuli, Italy
- Height: 1.91 m (6 ft 3 in)
- Position: Forward

Team information
- Current team: Cjarlins Muzane

Youth career
- Donatello Calcio
- –2010: Ancona Udine

Senior career*
| Years | Team | Apps | (Gls) |
| 2010–2012 | Sanvitese | 52 | (11) |
| 2012–2013 | Tamai | 8 | (1) |
| 2013–2015 | Virtus Corno | 45 | (34) |
| 2015–2016 | Tamai | 27 | (13) |
| 2016–2018 | Virtus Entella | 53 | (10) |
| 2019–2020 | Cittadella | 53 | (20) |
| 2020–2021 | Pordenone | 18 | (10) |
| 2021–2025 | Monza | 18 | (1) |
| 2021–2022 | → Vicenza (loan) | 32 | (7) |
| 2022–2023 | → Modena (loan) | 29 | (10) |
| 2023–2024 | → Bari (loan) | 12 | (2) |
| 2025–2026 | Cittadella | 25 | (2) |
| 2026– | Cjarlins Muzane | 0 | (0) |
- * Club domestic league appearances and goals as of 29 April 2026

Davide Djily Diaw (born 6 January 1992) is an Italian professional football player who plays as a forward for Serie D club Cjarlins Muzane.

== Early life ==
Diaw was born in Cividale del Friuli, Italy, to an Italian mother and a Senegalese father. Prior to becoming a professional footballer, he worked as a warehouse worker.

== Club career ==
=== Early career ===
A youth player for Donatello Calcio and Ancona Udine, in 2010 Diaw moved to Serie D side Sanvitese. After two seasons he moved to Tamai where, due to a knee injury, he had limited gametime. In 2013 he moved to Virtus Corno in the Eccellenza, scoring 34 league goals in 55 games in two seasons, and helping his side win the Coppa Italia Dilettanti. Diaw returned to Tamai on 15 July 2015.

=== Virtus Entella ===
On 1 July 2016, Diaw moved to Serie B side Virtus Entella, on a three-year contract. He made his Serie B debut on 9 October, in a 1–1 draw against Bari; Diaw's first goal came on 30 December, in a 2–1 away defeat to Cittadella. On 27 January 2018, he sustained an ACL injury, prematurely ending his season.

=== Cittadella ===
On 15 January 2019, after having played the first half of the 2018–19 Serie C with Virtus Entella, Diaw moved to Serie B club Cittadella on a three-year contract. He scored his first goal for the club on 4 May, in a 3–0 home win over Hellas Verona. Diaw scored once again on 11 May, in the last game of the regular season against Palermo. On 25 May he scored and made an assist in the promotion play-off semi-final game against Benevento. In the first leg of the play-off final, he scored his first career brace against Hellas Verona, helping his side win 2–0. Despite the two-goal advantage, Cittadella lost the second leg 3–0 and remained in the Serie B.

On 7 December Diaw scored his second brace, in a 4–3 league win over Salernitana. He finished the 2019–20 Serie B season with 15 goals between the regular season and the play-offs. In a year and a half, Diaw scored 22 goals in 56 games for Cittadella.

=== Pordenone ===
On 11 September 2020, Diaw moved to Serie B side Pordenone for €2.5 million, signing a four-year contract. He scored his first goal on 3 October in a home draw against Vicenza. Two weeks later, he scored a brace in a 3–3 draw to SPAL. In the first half of the 2020–21 Serie B, Diaw scored 10 goals in 18 games, and was the joint-top goalscorer to date.

=== Monza ===
On 29 January 2021, Diaw joined Monza in the Serie B on a three-and-a-half-year contract. He made his debut on 31 January, as a substitute against SPAL in a 1–1 league draw. Diaw's first goal for Monza came on 7 May, helping his team win 3–0 in a league game against Cosenza.

==== Loans to Vicenza, Modena and Bari ====
On 8 July 2021, Diaw was sent on a one-year loan to fellow-Serie B side Vicenza. On 19 July 2022, he joined newly-promoted Serie B side Modena on a one-year loan. On 15 August 2023, Diaw moved to Bari on a season-long loan, with Bari holding an obligation to make the transfer permanent in case of promotion to Serie A.

=== Return to Cittadella ===
On 3 February 2025, Diaw returned to Cittadella.

== Style of play ==
Diaw is a quick centre forward known for his high workrate, his first touch, and his movements. Despite being 1.91 m (6 ft 3 in) tall, Diaw is a mobile player.

== Personal life ==
Diaw and his partner, Vanessa Mattiussi, have a daughter named Celeste.

== Career statistics ==
As of match played 4 November 2023

Appearances and goals by club, season and competition
| Club | Season | League | | | National Cup (Note: Includes the Coppa Italia) | | Other | | Total | |
| Club | Season | Division | Apps | Goals | Apps | Goals | Apps | Goals | Apps | Goals |
|---|---|---|---|---|---|---|---|---|---|---|
| Sanvitese | 2010–11 | Serie D | 24 | 3 | — | | — | | 24 | 3 |
| Sanvitese | 2011–12 | Serie D | 28 | 8 | — | | — | | 28 | 8 |
| Sanvitese | Total | | 52 | 11 | 0 | 0 | 0 | 0 | 52 | 11 |
| Tamai | 2012–13 | Serie D | 8 | 1 | — | | — | | 8 | 1 |
| Virtus Corno | 2013–14 | Eccellenza | 29 | 15 | — | | — | | 29 | 15 |
| Virtus Corno | 2014–15 | Eccellenza | 31 | 19 | — | | — | | 31 | 19 |
| Virtus Corno | Total | | 60 | 34 | 0 | 0 | 0 | 0 | 60 | 34 |
| Tamai | 2015–16 | Serie D | 27 | 13 | — | | — | | 27 | 13 |
| Virtus Entella | 2016–17 | Serie B | 17 | 3 | 1 | 0 | — | | 18 | 3 |
| Virtus Entella | 2017–18 | Serie B | 20 | 3 | 1 | 0 | — | | 21 | 3 |
| Virtus Entella | 2018–19 | Serie C | 14 | 3 | 0 | 0 | — | | 14 | 3 |
| Virtus Entella | Total | | 51 | 9 | 2 | 0 | 0 | 0 | 53 | 9 |
| Cittadella | 2018–19 | Serie B | 13 | 2 | 0 | 0 | 4 (Note: Appearance(s) in Serie B promotion play-offs) | 3 | 17 | 5 |
| Cittadella | 2019–20 | Serie B | 35 | 13 | 3 | 2 | 1 | 2 | 39 | 17 |
| Cittadella | Total | | 48 | 15 | 3 | 2 | 5 | 5 | 56 | 22 |
| Pordenone | 2020–21 | Serie B | 18 | 10 | 0 | 0 | — | | 18 | 10 |
| Monza | 2020–21 | Serie B | 18 | 1 | — | | 2 | 0 | 20 | 1 |
| Vicenza (loan) | 2021–22 | Serie B | 32 | 7 | 1 | 0 | — | | 33 | 7 |
| Modena (loan) | 2022–23 | Serie B | 29 | 10 | 3 | 3 | — | | 32 | 13 |
| Bari (loan) | 2023–24 | Serie B | 8 | 2 | 0 | 0 | — | | 8 | 2 |
| Career total | | | 351 | 118 | 9 | 5 | 7 | 5 | 367 | 123 |

== Honours ==
Virtus Corno

- Coppa Italia Dilettanti Friuli-Venezia Giulia: 2014–15
