= Hadja Fatimata Ouattara =

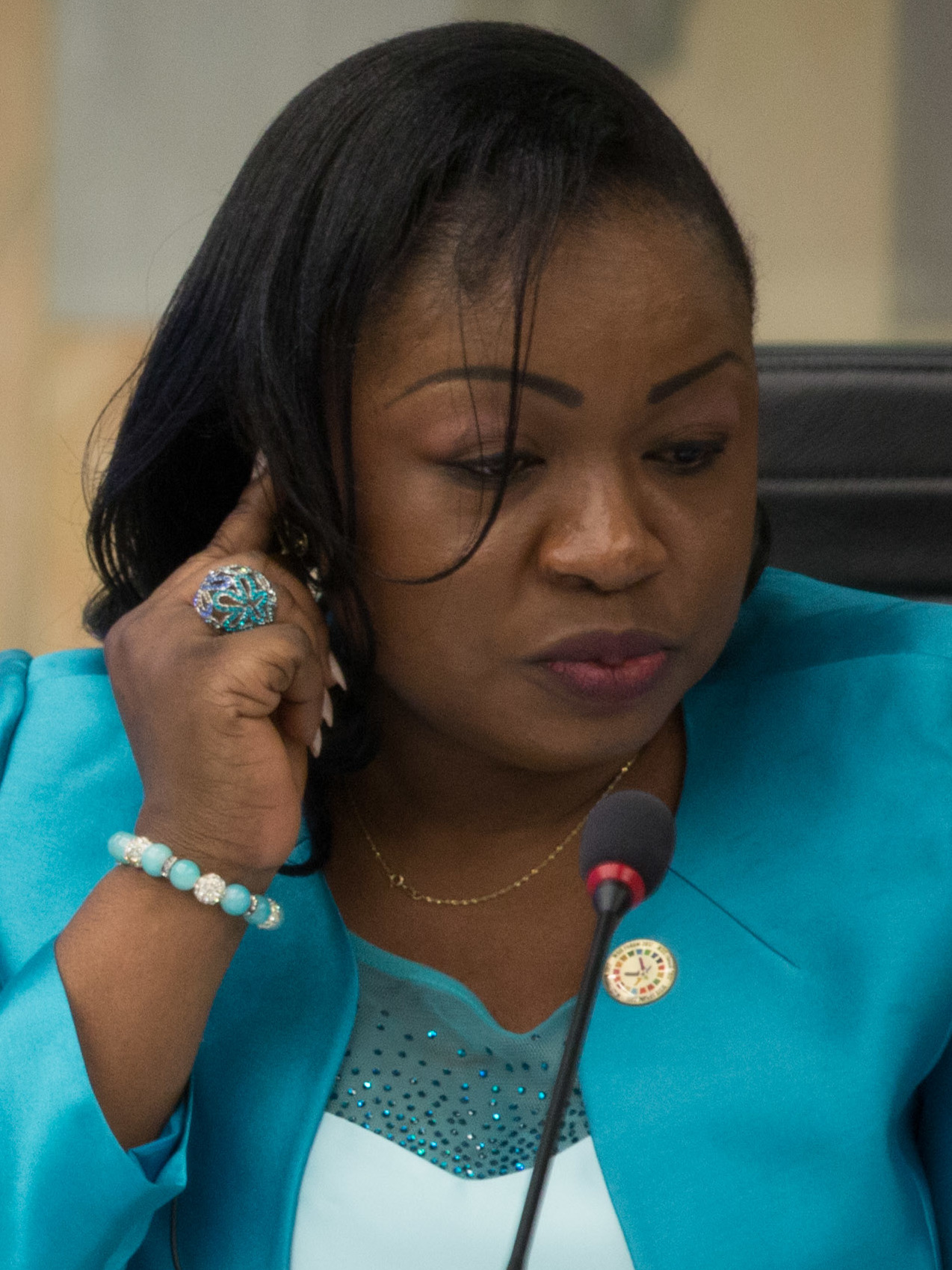

Minister of Digital Economy and Postal Development of Burkina Faso
- In office 23 February 2017 – 24 January 2022
- Prime Minister: Paul Kaba Thieba
- Preceded by: Aminata Sana Congo
- Succeeded by: Aminata Zerbo-Sabané

Personal details
- Education: Polytechnic University of Bobo-Dioulasso; Humber College

Hadja Fatimata Ouattara (nee Sanon) is a Burkina Faso politician who was Minister of Digital Economy and Postal Development from February 2017 to January 2022.

== Early life and education ==
Ouattara attended Sainte-Marie College in the Bobo-Dioulasso neighbourhood of Tounouma and has a degree in computer engineering from the Polytechnic University of Bobo-Dioulasso and a Masters in computer network and multimedia from the International Centre for Applied Advanced Studies at Humber College in Canada.

== Career ==
In 2005, Ouattara became the webmaster of the Burkina Knowledge Management Network and created the Burkinabè Association for Linux and Free Software. She was Technical Advisor to the ICT Ministry. She also worked for several NGOs and is a founding member of the African Free Software Network. During the transitional period after the 2014 Burkinabé uprising, she held the position of Technical Secretary for the Ministry of Civil Service.

Ouattara was appointed Minister of Digital Economy and Postal Development by President Roch Marc Christian Kaboré on 23 February 2017. In April 2017, she launched the construction of thirteen metropolitan fiber optic loops in each regional capital of the country, a 36 million euro project designed called "G-cloud", largely funded through the Danish International Development Agency.

In June, she was one of the founders of the inaugural Francophone African Conference on Open Data and Open Government, with representatives from 22 African countries. In July, she opened the Second IT Forum Burkina Faso in Ouagadougou and affirmed the government's goal to fully computerize its administrative processes and provide universal access to digital technology for all Burkinabès.
