= Céline Yoda =

Burkinabé politician (born 1958)

Son Execellence Celine Yoda
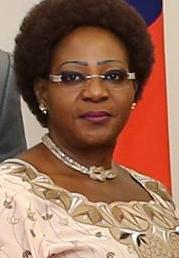
- Céline Yoda in June 2016

Ambassador of Burkina Faso to Taiwan
- In office 2013–2016
- Preceded by: Jacques Yamlaneba Sawadogo
- Succeeded by: Aminata Sana Congo

Personal details
- Born: April 6, 1958 (age 68) Burkina Faso
- Education: social and familial economics
- Honours: Ordre de l’Etoile brillante avec Grand Cordon a Taiwan, 2017

Céline Yoda (born April 6, 1958) is a Burkinabé politician. She was the ambassador of Burkinabe in Taiwan (R.O.C) from 2013-2017.

She also served as the Minister for the Promotion of Women, having formerly been the Ambassador for Burkina Faso to Denmark.

== Early life and education ==
Yoda received her diploma from the École Normale Supérieure d’Enseignement Technique et Professionnel in Dakar, Senegal, where she studied social and familial economics. Before serving in public office, she spent a long career working for non-governmental organizations and some government groups.

== Political career ==
She was the first female secretary general of SPONG (the Secrétariat Permanent des ONG, Burkina Faso's organization of NGO's); she served in this position for two terms. She also worked for a time for the United Nations in Burkina Faso as a national expert on "population creation and development".

From 1997 to 2000, she was the Minister for the Promotion of Women, and was the inaugural holder of that post following its creation. She was subsequently named as the Burkina Faso's Ambassador to Denmark, and held that post until 2007 when she returned to her country to become the Minister for the Promotion of Women once more. She remained in this post until 2011, when she was replaced in the role by Nestorine Sangaré.

She was named her country's Ambassador to Denmark once again in 2016. She later described that she felt that the equal rights between men and women that she saw there and in other Scandinavian countries was something she hoped would eventually be fostered in Africa. One of her addition duties was the sponsor of the diplomatic mission to Taiwan, which reopened that year following an absence of 20 years. She said in an interview that the Taiwanese population shared many similarities with Burkina Faso, and that the model of development undertaken by the country over the past 50 years was one that her country should strive to imitate. Following her duties in Copenhagen, she returned to the Burkina Faso government as the Minister for the Promotion of Women again.
