= Nigerian people in Italy =

- (Italy) (Nigeria)
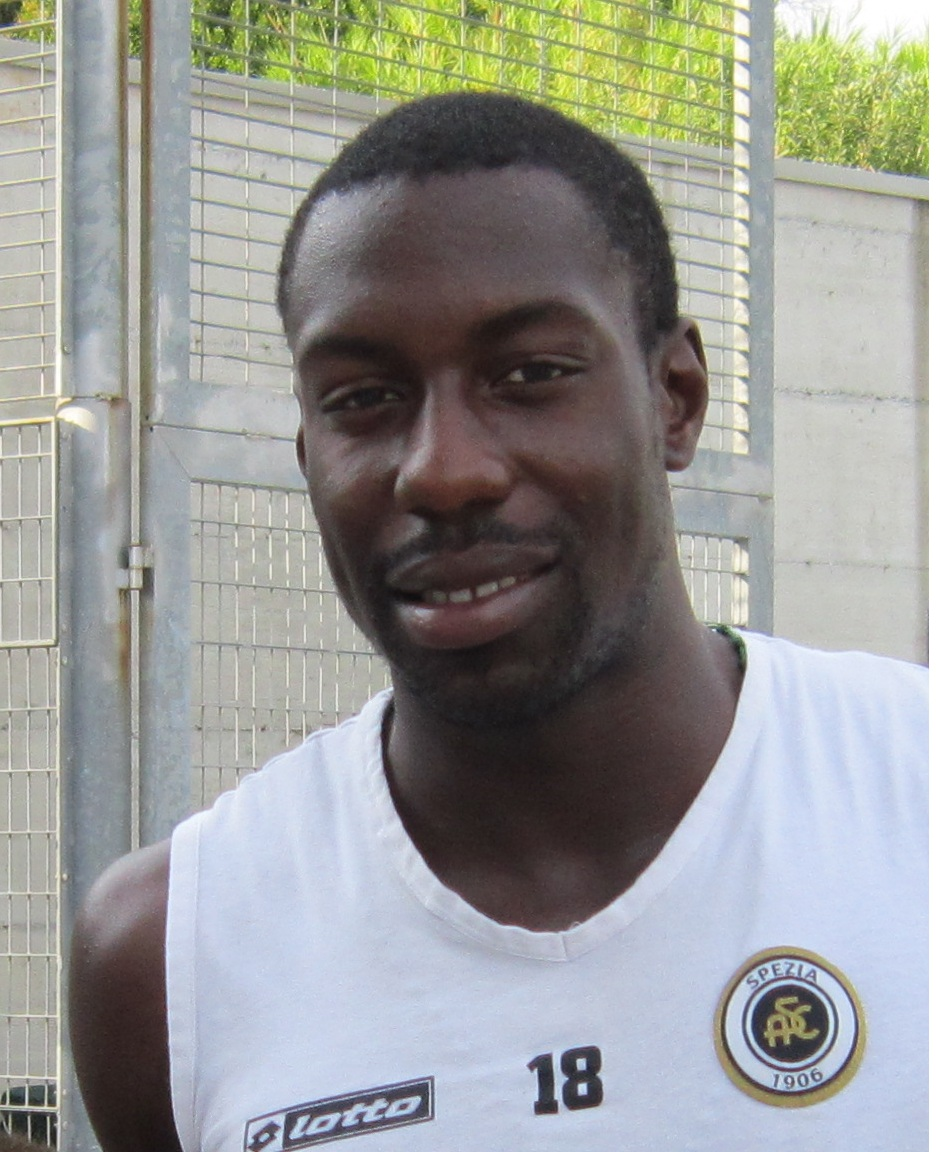
Stefano Okaka

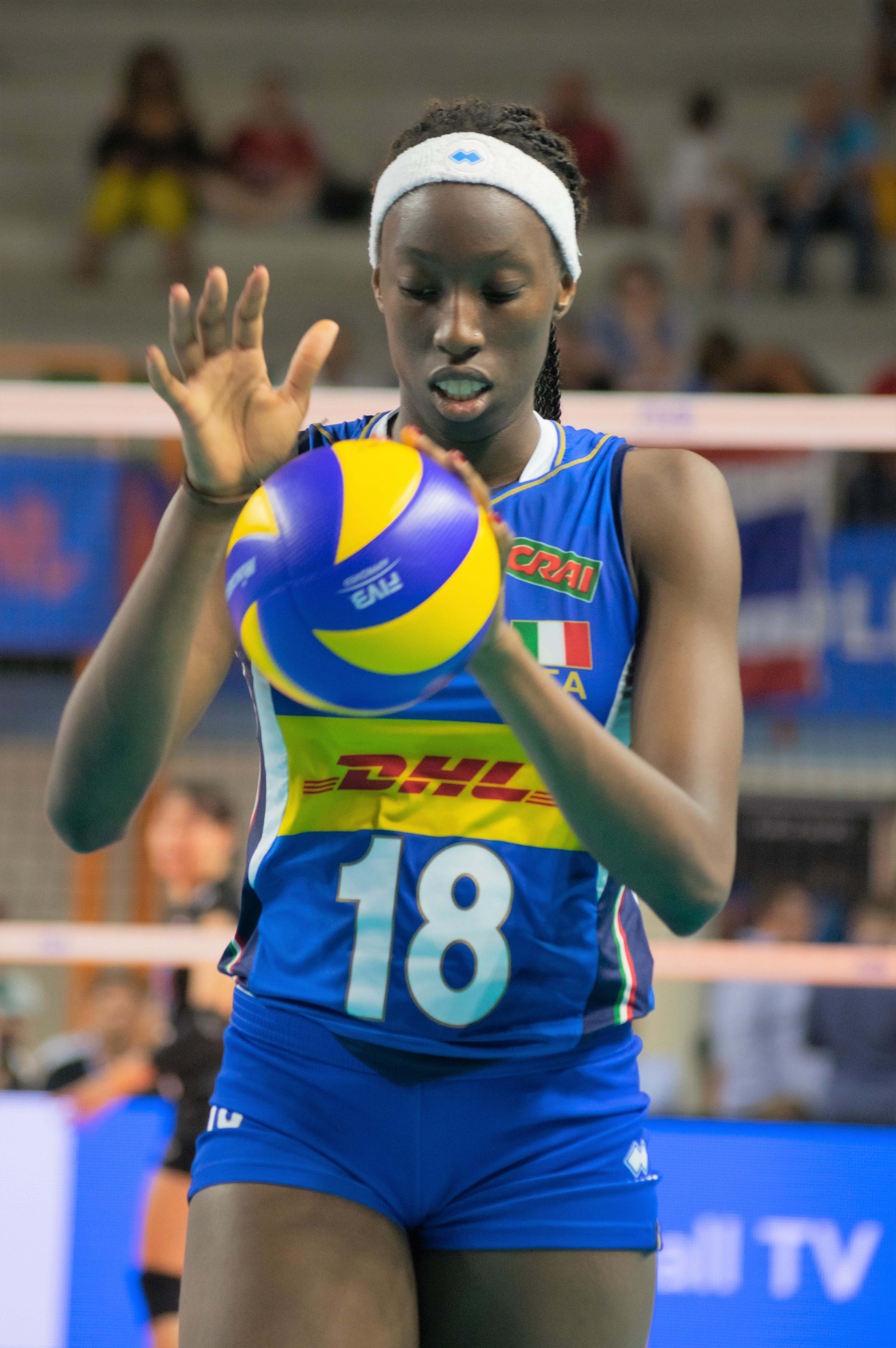
Paola Egonu

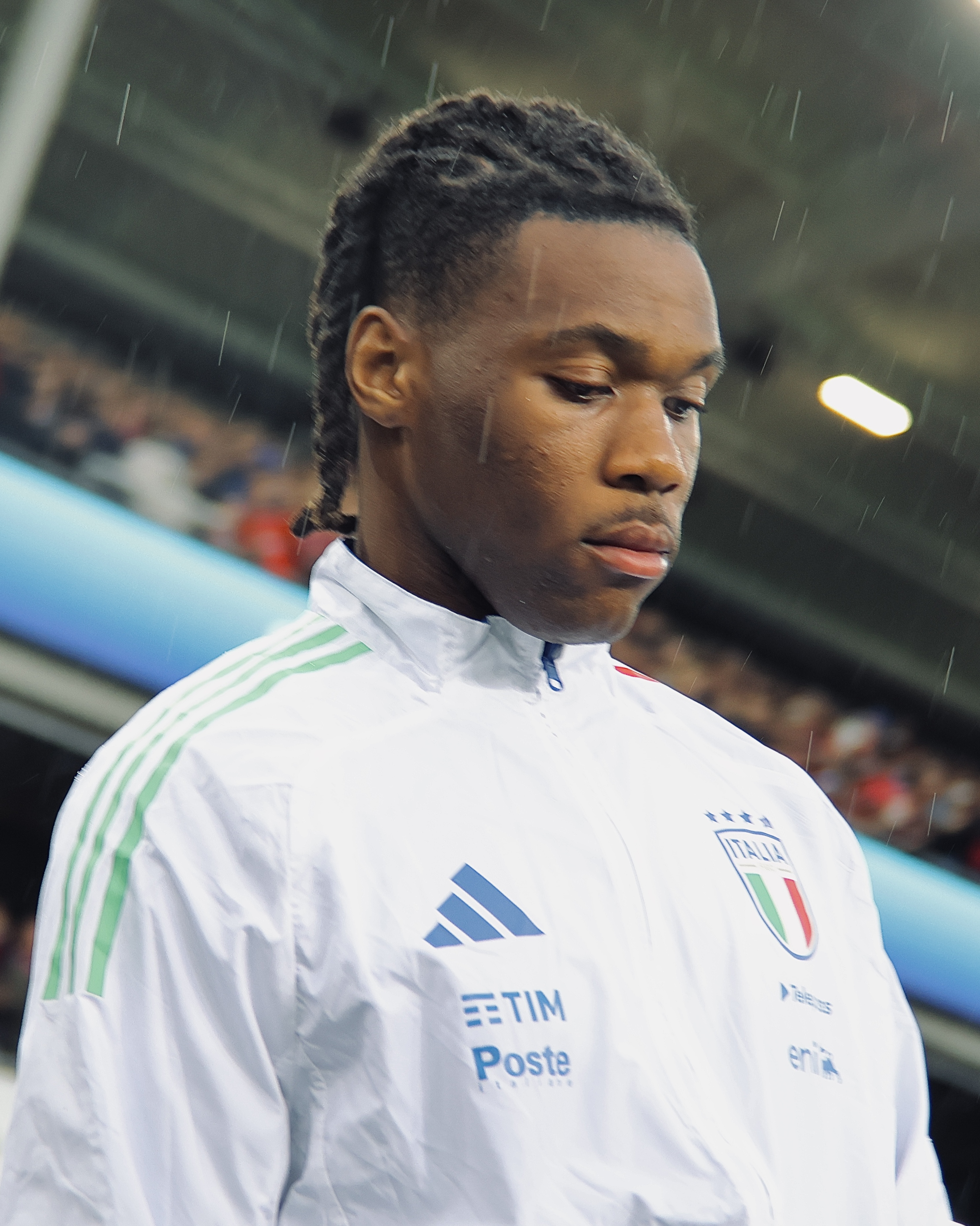
Destiny Udogie

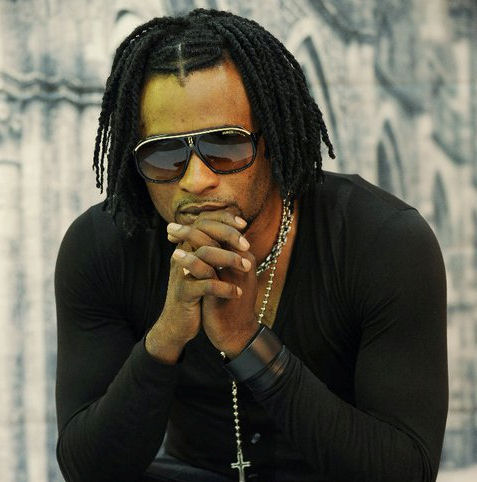
Eddy Wata

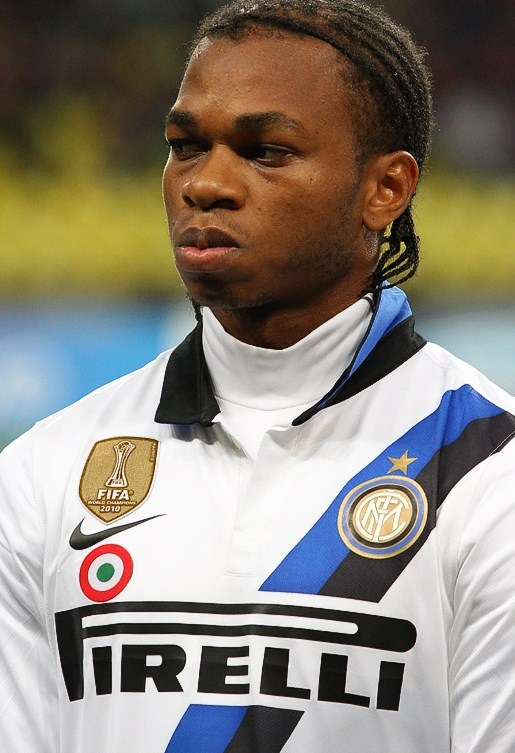
Joel Obi

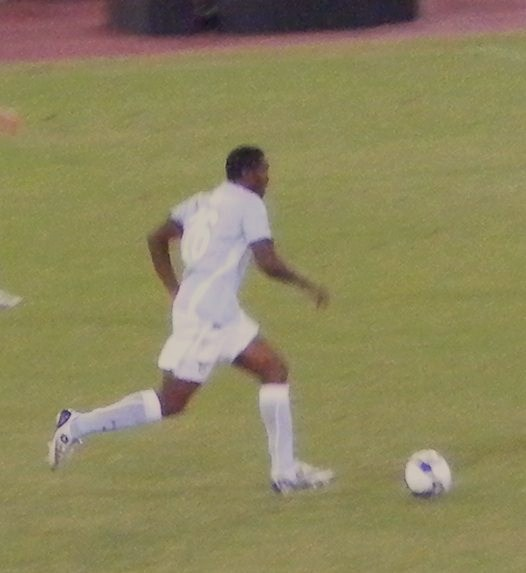
Stephen Makinwa

Total population
- 119,435 (ISTAT: 2021)

Regions with significant populations
- Veneto · Emilia-Romagna · Lombardy · Sicily

Languages
- English · Italian · Niger–Congo languages

Religion
- Protestantism · Catholic Church · Sunni Islam

The presence of Nigerians in Italy dates back to the 1980s.

== Demographics ==
In 2021, there were 119,435 immigrants from Nigeria in Italy. In 2014 in Italy there were 71,158 regular immigrants from Nigeria, while In 2006 there were 37,733. In 2023, the regions with the highest percentages of Nigerians were Emilia-Romagna, Lombardy and Veneto.

== Notable people ==
- Eddy Wata (1976), singer
- Emeka Jude Ugali (1982), footballer
- Stephen Makinwa (1983), footballer
- Osarimen Giulio Ebagua (1986), footballer
- Angelo Ogbonna (1988), footballer
- Maria Benedicta Chigbolu (1989), olympic athlete
- Stefano Okaka (1989), footballer
- Joel Obi (1991), footballer
- Nicolao Dumitru (1991), footballer
- Awudu Abass (1993), basketball player
- Sara Bonifacio (1996), volleyball player
- Paola Egonu (1998), volleyball player
- Victor Osimhen (1998), footballer
- Destiny Udogie (2002), footballer

== See also ==
- Senegalese people in Italy
- African emigrants to Italy
