= Antonio Cardore =

Italian football player (born 1996)

Personal information
- Date of birth: 18 January 1996 (age 30)
- Place of birth: Naples, Italy
- Height: 1.87 m (6 ft 2 in)
- Position: Midfielder

Team information
- Current team: Enna
- Number: 24

Youth career
- 2012–2015: Juve Stabia
- 2014–2015: → Virtus Entella (loan)

Senior career*
Years	Team	Apps	(Gls)
2014	Juve Stabia	2	(0)
2015–2016	Virtus Entella	0	(0)
2015–2016	→ Martina Franca (loan)	3	(0)
2016–2017	Viterbese	13	(0)
2017–2019	Lucchese	13	(0)
2018	→ Arzachena (loan)	8	(0)
2019	Sorrento	9	(0)
2019–2020	US Levico Terme	27	(6)
2020–2021	Bra	14	(3)
2021	Derthona	14	(1)
2021–2022	Gelbison	17	(1)
2022	Cassino	9	(0)
2022–2023	Bitonto	21	(2)
2023	Angri	7	(0)
2023–2024	Rotonda	18	(1)
2024	Acireale	4	(0)
2024–	Enna	7	(0)
- * Club domestic league appearances and goals as of 17 November 2024

Antonio Cardore (born 18 January 1996) is an Italian football player who plays for Serie D club Enna.

== Club career ==
He made his Serie B debut for Juve Stabia on 26 April 2014 in a game against Trapani.

On 22 July 2017 he signed a 2-years deal for Lucchese.

On 30 January 2019 he was released from his contract with Lucchese by mutual consent. After a spell at Sorrento from January to July 2019 and a spell at US Levico Terme for the 2019-20 season, Cardore moved to Bra in the summer 2020. In February 2021, he joined Derthona. On 30 July 2021, Cardore moved to Gelbison.
