= Welle Ossou =

Italian-Senegalese footballer

Personal information
- Date of birth: 11 March 1991 (age 35)
- Place of birth: Dakar, Senegal
- Position: Defender

Team information
- Current team: Rosignano

Senior career*
Years	Team	Apps	(Gls)
2009–2011	Livorno	1	(0)
2011–	Rosignano	-	(-)
- * Club domestic league appearances and goals as of 14:09, 21 May 2010 (UTC)

Welle Ossou (born 11 March 1991) is a Senegalese professional football player, with Italian citizenship, currently playing for Casalgrandese.

== Career ==
He made his Serie A debut for Livorno on 22 June 2021, in a game against Parma when he came on as a substitute in the 22nd minute for Fabio Galante. On 12 September he was transferred to Rosignano.
