= Aminata Boureima Takoubakoyé =

Nigerien economist and politician

- Born: Aminata Takoubakoyé Soumana; September 23, 1979 (age 46); Niamey, Niger
- Occupations: Economist, Politician

Aminata Boureima Takoubakoyé (born Aminata Takoubakoyé Soumana on September 23, 1979, in Niamey, Niger) is a Nigerien economist and politician. Between February 2010 and April 2011, Takoubakoyé headed the Ministry of Communications and Information Technology and Culture in the Transitional Government of the Military Junta of the Supreme Council for the Restoration of Democracy.

== Career ==
On her return to Niger after studying in Rabat, in Morocco, Aminata Takoubakoyé accepted a position as an expert in the National Bureau of Central Revenue at the Niger National Statistical Institute. From April 2004 to September 2009, she was an Information and Evaluation Officer at the Permanent Secretariat of the Poverty Reduction Strategy Plan ( Secrétariat Permanent de la Stratégie de Réduction de la Pauvreté). Subsequently, from September 2009 to March 2010, Takoubakoyé was coordinator at the National Observatory for Poverty ( Observatoire National de la Pauvreté ). In March 2010, General Salou Djibo, Commander-in-Chief of the Nigerien Army, appointed her to the Transitional Government and entrusted her with the Department of Communications, New Information Technologies and Culture. She held the office until April 2011.
