= Aminata Koné =

French housing activist

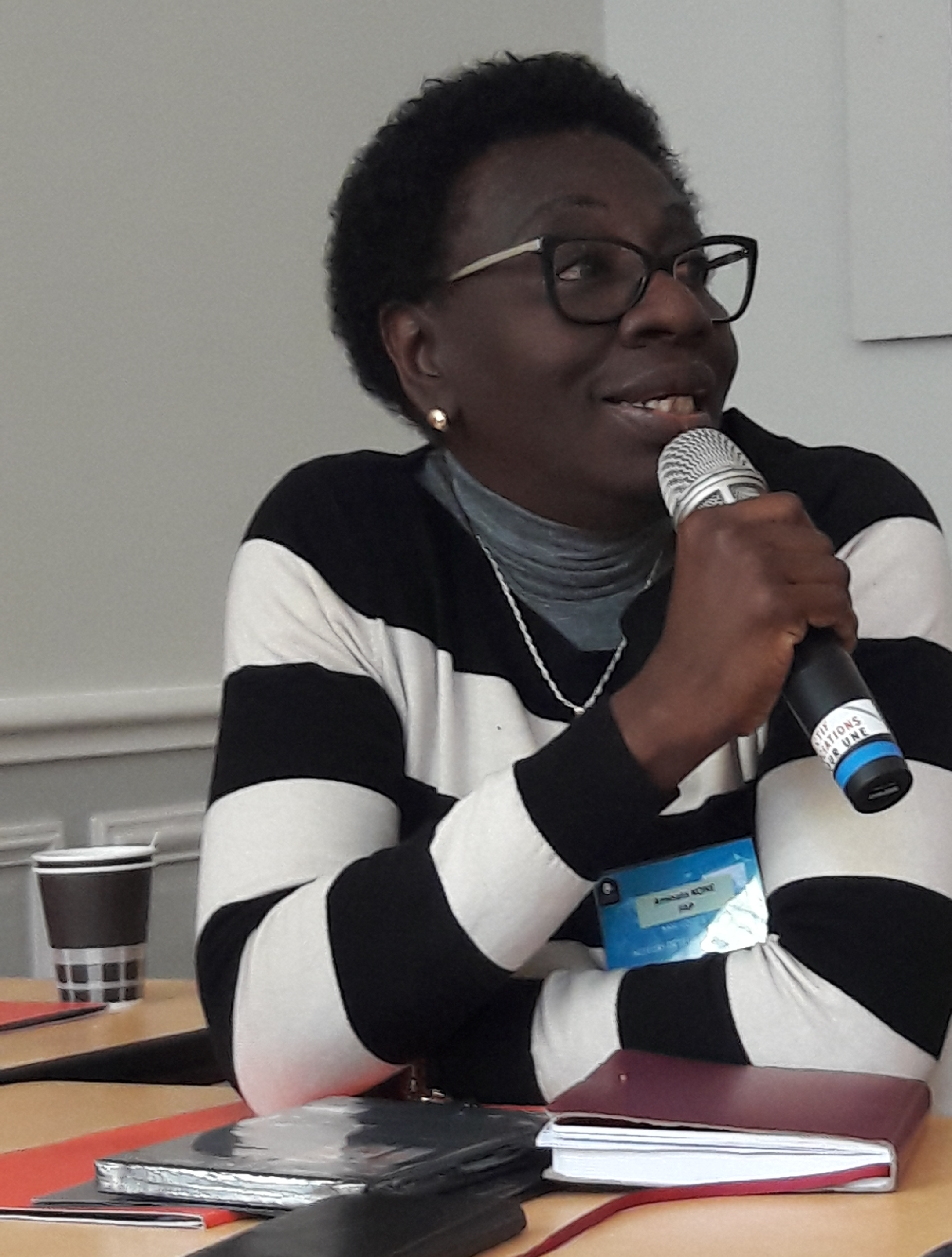
- Awards: Chevalier, Legion of Honour; Officier, Ordre national du Mérite

Aminata Koné is a French lawyer and activist of Ivorian descent for affordable family housing. She has been the vice-president of the Abbé Pierre Foundation for Affordable Housing (fr), the general secretary of the family advocacy union Confédération syndicale des familles (fr), and a member of the French Economic, Social and Environmental Council. She is a Chevalier (Knight) of the Legion of Honour, and an Officier (Officer) of the Ordre national du Mérite.

== Career ==
Koné is a lawyer. She is the General Secretary of the Confédération syndicale des familles (Family Trade Union Confederation), which is a Familial Association in France (fr), a consumer organization for advancing the interests of families. At the Confédération syndicale des familles, Koné works on poverty reduction projects.

Koné is a member of the French Economic, Social and Environmental Council, a consultative assembly which advises lawmakers on social, economic, and environmental policies. At the Economic, Social, and Environmental Council Koné represents the Confédération syndicale des familles. She is also president of the social affairs and health section of the Economic, Social, and Environmental Council, and is a member of the delegation for equality and the rights of women. She represents the Confédération syndicale des familles at the French governmental advisory body Haut Conseil de la famille, de l'enfance et de l'âge (High council for the Family, Childhood, and Age).

Koné is also the vice-president of the Abbé Pierre Foundation for Affordable Housing, which advocates for housing rights and the creation and defense of affordable housing opportunities.

In 2012, she was named a Chevalier of the Legion of Honour after 25 years of service at the Confédération syndicale des familles. In 2019, she was named an Officier of the Ordre national du Mérite.

== Selected awards ==
- 2012: Knight of the Legion of Honour
- 2019: Officer of the French National Order of Merit
