= Héctor Otín =

Spanish footballer

Personal information
- Full name: Héctor Otín Lafuente
- Date of birth: 19 January 1996 (age 30)
- Place of birth: Zaragoza, Spain
- Height: 1.84 m (6 ft 0 in)
- Position: Forward

Youth career
- Real Zaragoza
- 2012–2015: Juventus
- 2014–2015: → Virtus Entella (loan)

Senior career*
Years	Team	Apps	(Gls)
2015–2018	Virtus Entella	6	(0)
2016–2017	→ Reggiana (loan)	6	(0)
2017	→ Gubbio (loan)	5	(0)
2017–2018	→ Marbella (loan)	24	(0)
2018–2020	Ejea	27	(1)
2020	Getafe B	2	(0)
2020–2022	Teruel	22	(0)
2022	Barbastro	8	(1)
2022–2024	Calamocha	54	(0)

International career
2011	Spain U16	1	(0)
- * Club domestic league appearances and goals as of 12 May 2024

Héctor Otín Lafuente (born 19 January 1996) is a Spanish professional footballer who plays as a forward.

== Club career ==
Born in Zaragoza, Otín started his career with the youth academy of local Real Zaragoza and moved to the academy of Italian club Juventus on 31 August 2012. On 1 September 2014, he was loaned out to second-tier club Virtus Entella. However, he made no appearances and instead trained with the youth team. After having scored 10 goals for the reserves, he signed permanently with the club in July 2015. On 18 January 2016, he made his first team debut, coming as a 79th-minute substitute for Pedro Miguel in a 4–0 victory over Ascoli.

Otín spent the first half of 2016–17 season on loan at Reggiana and featured six times in the league. On 17 January 2017, he moved to fellow league club Gubbio on loan. In July, he trialed with English club Bolton Wanderers with The Bolton News writing that the club might offer him a contract.

On 25 August 2017, Otín joined Spanish third-tier club Marbella FC on a loan deal. On 19 July 2018, he signed with fellow league club SD Ejea.

== International career ==
Otín has been once capped at the under-16 level.
