= Joel Baraye =

Senegalese footballer (born 1997)

Personal information
- Date of birth: 5 January 1997 (age 29)
- Place of birth: Dakar, Senegal
- Height: 1.82 m (5 ft 11 1/2 in)
- Position: Defender

Team information
- Current team: Alghero

Youth career
- –2014: Brescia

Senior career*
Years	Team	Apps	(Gls)
2014–2016	Brescia	2	(0)
2016–2020	Entella	20	(0)
2018	→ Carrarese (loan)	12	(0)
2018–2019	→ Catania (loan)	26	(0)
2019–2020	→ Padova (loan)	22	(1)
2020–2022	Padova	2	(0)
2020–2021	→ Salernitana (loan)	1	(0)
2021	→ Avellino (loan)	10	(0)
2021–2022	→ Monopoli (loan)	0	(0)
2023–	Alghero	0	(0)
- * Club domestic league appearances and goals as of 1 July 2022

Joel Baraye (born 5 January 1997) is a Senegalese football player who plays as a defender for Italian club Alghero.

== Club career ==
He made his professional debut in the Serie B for Brescia on 17 May 2014 in a game against Varese.

On 30 January 2018 he joined Carrarese on loan.

On 25 August 2018, he was signed by Catania, in a temporary deal.

On 16 July 2019, he signed by Padova on loan with an obligation to buy.

On 5 October 2020 he joined Salernitana on loan. If certain conditions were met, Salernitana would have held an obligation to purchase his rights at the end of the loan.

On 7 January 2021 he went to Avellino on loan.

On 31 August 2021, he was loaned to Monopoli.
