= Paolo Valagussa =

Italian footballer

Personal information
- Date of birth: 16 May 1993 (age 33)
- Place of birth: Milan, Italy
- Height: 1.82 m (5 ft 11 1/2 in)
- Position: Midfielder

Team information
- Current team: Trevigliese

Youth career
- 2008–2010: Pro Sesto
- 2010–2011: Monza

Senior career*
Years	Team	Apps	(Gls)
2011–2014	Monza	100	(13)
2014–2017	Virtus Entella	4	(0)
2015–2016	→ Renate (loan)	25	(1)
2016–2017	→ Gubbio (loan)	32	(5)
2017–2018	Gubbio	14	(0)
2018	Viterbese	0	(0)
2018–2019	Rezzato	22	(1)
2019–2020	Arzignano	15	(0)
2020–2021	Caratese	30	(7)
2021–2023	Sanremese	65	(11)
2023–2024	Vado	31	(6)
2024–2025	Città di Varese	32	(4)
2025	Sant'Angelo	7	(0)
2025–	Trevigliese	24	(0)
- * Club domestic league appearances and goals as of 29 May 2026

Paolo Valagussa (born 16 May 1993) is an Italian footballer who plays as a midfielder for Serie D club Trevigliese.

== Club career ==
On 24 October 2018 he joined Serie D club Rezzato.

On 29 August 2019 he signed with Arzignano. His contract with Arzignano was dissolved by mutual consent on 21 January 2020.
