= Aminata Sana Congo =

Burkina Faso politician

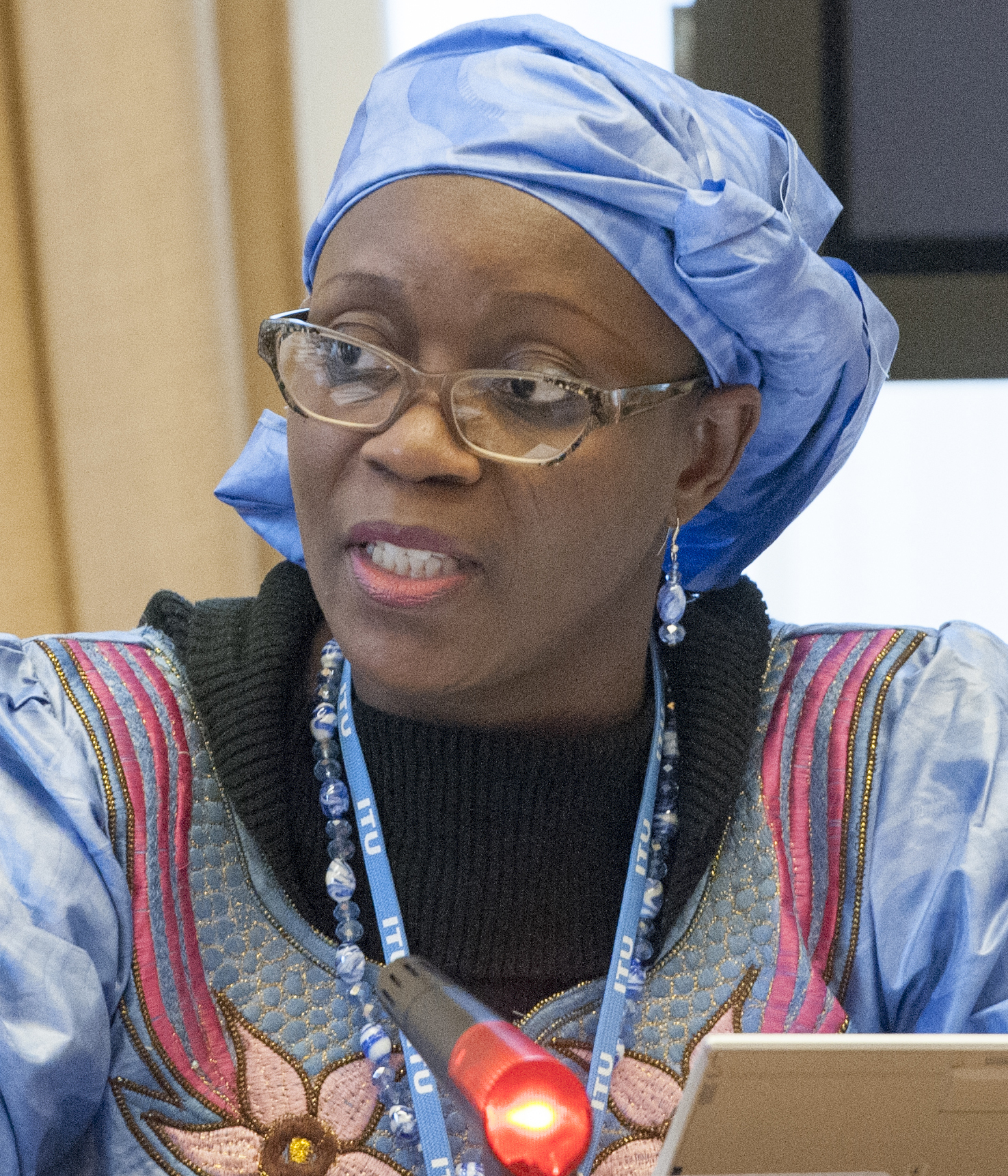

Minister of Digital Economy and Postal Development of Burkina Faso
- In office 12 January 2016 – February 2017
- Prime Minister: Paul Kaba Thieba
- Preceded by: Nébila Amadou Yaro
- Succeeded by: Hadja Fatimata Ouattara

Ambassador of Burkina Faso to Taiwan
- In office 14 August 2017 – May 29, 2018
- President: Roch Marc Christian Kaboré
- Preceded by: Céline Yoda

Personal details
- Born: 1974 (age 51–52)
- Spouse: Aminata Congo

Aminata Sana Congo (born 1974) is a Burkina Faso politician and diplomat. She was a Minister of Development of the Digital Economy and the Posts from January 2016 to February 2017. She was appointed Ambassador to Taiwan in August 2017.

== Career ==
Sana is a computer scientist and worked at the General Delegation of Informatics. In 2010, she joined the Pan African Forum as Director of Organization and Communication. In 2013, she became Director of training and promotion in ICT.

On 12 January 2016, Sana was appointed Minister of Development of the Digital Economy and the Posts by Prime Minister Paul Kaba Thieba. She resigned in February 2017 amid controversy over Huawei tablets given to parliament.

On 14 August 2017, Sana was appointed as Burkina Faso's ambassador to Taiwan by President Roch Marc Christian Kaboré.

== Personal life ==
Sana is married to Aminata Congo and has two children.
