= Lorenzo Staiti =

Italian footballer

Personal information
- Date of birth: 27 February 1987 (age 39)
- Place of birth: Treviso, Italy
- Height: 1.77 m (5 ft 10 in)
- Position: Midfielder

Team information
- Current team: Reggiana
- Number: 23

Senior career*
Years	Team	Apps	(Gls)
2006–2009	Bassano Virtus	67	(2)
2009–2011	Sambonifacese	64	(10)
2011–2016	Virtus Entella	139	(19)
2016–2018	FeralpiSalò	63	(3)
2018–	Reggiana	60	(6)
- * Club domestic league appearances and goals as of 3 June 2018

Lorenzo Staiti (born 27 February 1987) is an Italian footballer who plays for Reggiana as a midfielder.

== Career ==
Staiti began his senior career with Bassano Virtus. In 2009, he joined Sambonifacese. Two years later, Staiti signed with Virtus Entella and was part of the team which won the promotion to the Serie B in 2014.
