= Jan Havlena =

Czech footballer

Personal information
- Date of birth: 9 December 1998 (age 27)
- Place of birth: Náchod, Czech Republic
- Height: 1.81 m (5 ft 11 1/2 in)
- Position: Midfielder

Team information
- Current team: Chrudim
- Number: 9

Youth career
- –2015: Náchod-Deštné
- 2015–2019: Entella

Senior career*
Years	Team	Apps	(Gls)
2016–2019	Entella	1	(0)
2019–2020	Bohemians B	3	(0)
2020–	Chrudim	20	(1)
- * Club domestic league appearances and goals as of 18:46, 25 May 2021 (UTC)

Jan Havlena (born 9 December 1998) is a Czech football player who plays for FK Náchod.

== Club career ==
He made his professional debut in the Serie B for Entella on 1 October 2016 in a game against Vicenza. After three long injuries, latest an anterior cruciate ligament injury in January 2018, Havlena returned to the pitch in August 2018. However, he left Entella at the end of the season.

Ahead of the 2019–20 season, Havlena joined Bohemians 1905 to play for the club's B-team. He played three games for the club before leaving on 22 February 2020 to join MFK Chrudim.
