= Luca Oneto =

Italian footballer

Personal information
- Date of birth: 11 November 1996 (age 29)
- Place of birth: Lavagna, Italy
- Height: 1.83 m (6 ft 0 in)
- Position: Defender

Team information
- Current team: Campodarsego

Youth career
- –2015: Virtus Entella

Senior career*
Years	Team	Apps	(Gls)
2015–2017	Virtus Entella	0	(0)
2015–2016	→ Lavagnese (loan)	37	(3)
2016–2017	→ Santarcangelo (loan)	25	(0)
2017–2019	Südtirol	16	(0)
2019–2021	Lavagnese	62	(3)
2021–	Campodarsego	80	(4)
- * Club domestic league appearances and goals as of 20 December 2023

Luca Oneto (born 11 November 1996) is an Italian football player who plays for Serie D Group C club Campodarsego.

== Club career ==
He made his Serie C debut for Santarcangelo on 27 August 2016 in a game against Feralpisalò.

On 21 August 2019, he returned to his hometown, re-joining his local Serie D club Lavagnese.
