= Aminata Coulibaly =

French volleyball player (born 1989)

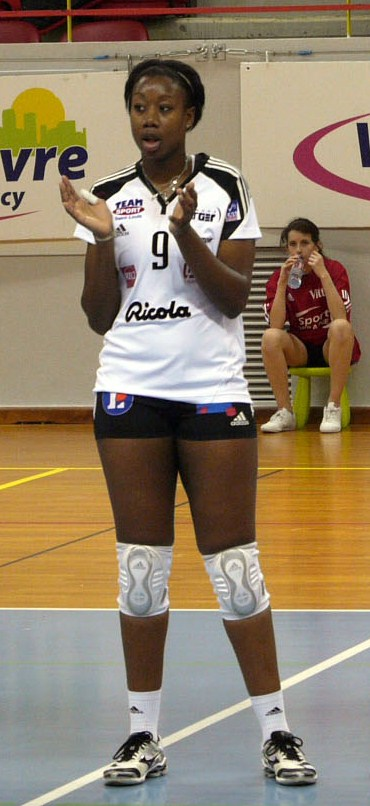

Personal information
- Nationality: French
- Born: 27 September 1989 (age 37)

Volleyball information
- Position: outside hitter
- Number: 3 (national team)

Career
Years	Teams
2009	(France) ASPTT Mulhouse

National team
2009	France

Aminata Coulibaly (born 27 September 1989) is a retired French female volleyball player, playing as an outside hitter. She was part of the France women's national volleyball team.

She competed at the 2009 Women's European Volleyball Championship, and 2011 Women's European Volleyball Championship. On club level she played for ASPTT Mulhouse in 2009.
