= Andrea Paroni =

Italian footballer (born 1989)

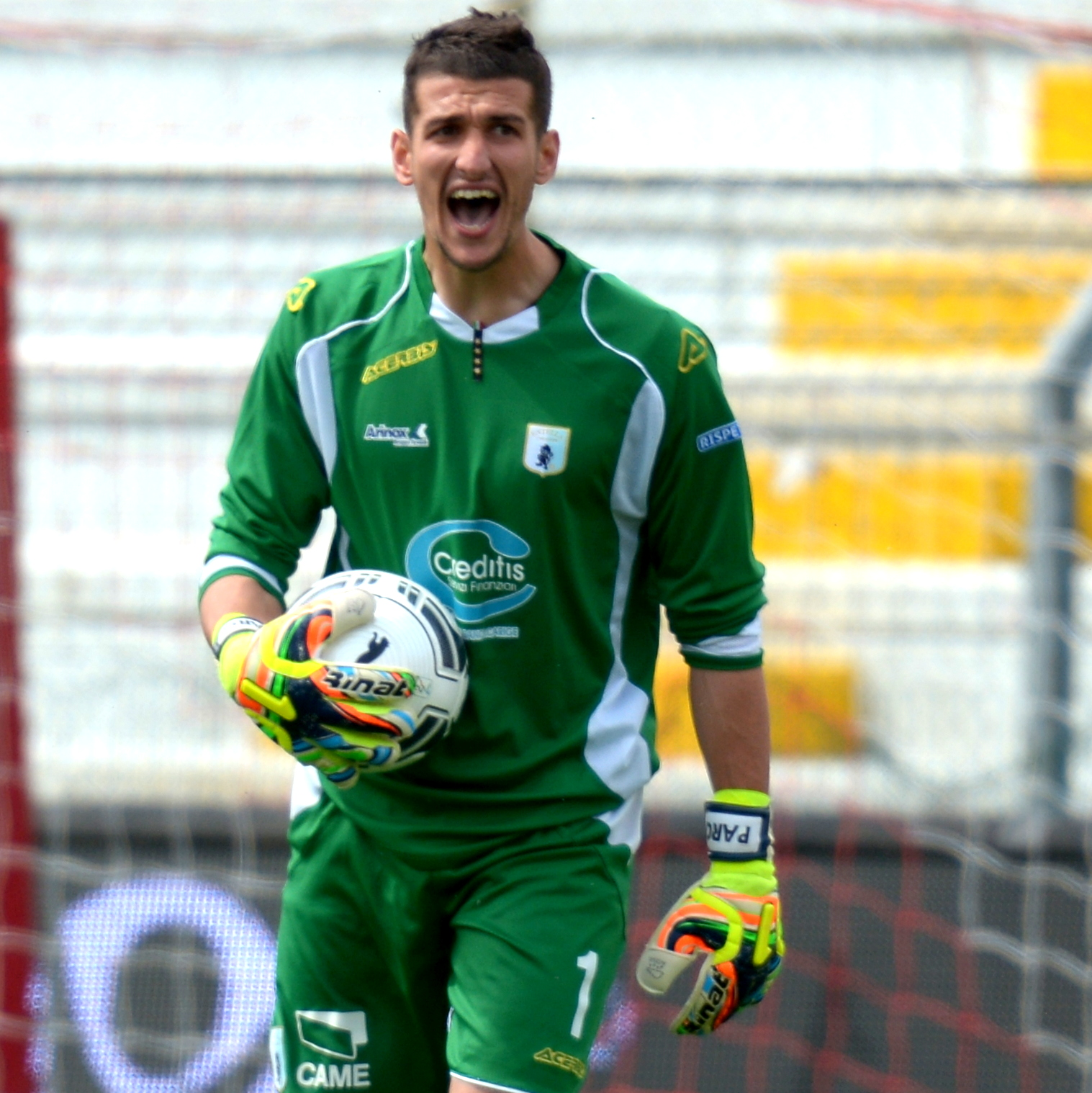
- Andrea Paroni in action during the match Vicenza vs. Entella

Personal information
- Date of birth: 14 October 1989 (age 37)
- Place of birth: San Vito al Tagliamento, Italy
- Height: 1.90 m (6 ft 3 in)
- Position: Goalkeeper

Youth career
- –2008: Udinese

Senior career*
Years	Team	Apps	(Gls)
2008–2025	Virtus Entella	279	(0)
- * Club domestic league appearances and goals

Andrea Paroni (born 14 October 1989) is an Italian former footballer who played as a goalkeeper.

== Career statistics ==
As of match played 19 December 2021

Appearances and goals by club, season and competition
Club	Season	League			National Cup		Other		Total	
Club	Season	Division	Apps	Goals	Apps	Goals	Apps	Goals	Apps	Goals
Virtus Entella	2008–09	Serie D	34	0	—		—		34	0
Virtus Entella	2009–10	Serie D	24	0	—		—		24	0
Virtus Entella	2010–11	Serie D	23	0	—		—		23	0
Virtus Entella	2011–12	Lega Pro 2	35	0	—		4 (Note: Appearance(s) in Promotion Playoffs)	1	39	1
Virtus Entella	2012–13	Lega Pro	32	0	2	0	2	0	36	0
Virtus Entella	2013–14	Lega Pro	30	0	2	0	—		32	0
Virtus Entella	2014–15	Serie B	31	0	0	0	2 (Note: Appearance(s) in Relegation Playoffs)	0	33	0
Virtus Entella	2015–16	Serie B	1	0	0	0	—		1	0
Virtus Entella	2016–17	Serie B	1	0	0	0	—		1	0
Virtus Entella	2017–18	Serie B	4	0	0	0	2	0	6	0
Virtus Entella	2018–19	Serie C	22	0	4	0	—		26	0
Virtus Entella	2019–20	Serie B	1	0	0	0	—		1	0
Virtus Entella	2020–21	Serie B	0	0	0	0	—		0	0
Virtus Entella	2021–22	Serie C	14	0	—		—		14	0
Virtus Entella	Total		252	0	8	0	0	0	270	1
Career total			252	0	8	0	10	1	270	1
