= Florencio Varela =

Florencio Varela could refer to:

- Florencio Varela (writer), Argentine writer, journalist and educator
- Florencio Varela, Buenos Aires, a town named after the writer
- Florencio Varela Partido, the administrative district of the town
