= Latina Calcio 1932 =

Italian football club

Latina
- Full name: Latina Calcio 1932 S.r.l.
- Nickname: Leoni
- Founded: 1932
- Ground: Stadio Domenico Francioni, Latina, Italy
- Capacity: 9,398
- Chairman: Antonio Terracciano
- Manager: Gennaro Volpe
- League: Serie C Group B
- 2025–26: Serie C Group C, 13th of 20
- Website: latinacalcio1932.it
Home colours	Away colours	Third colours

Latina Calcio 1932, commonly referred to as Latina, is an Italian football club based in Latina, Lazio. They currently play in the Serie C Group B.

== History ==
The club was founded in 1932 as Unione Sportiva Latina Calcio and subsequently re-established several times until 2009, when it attained the name U.S. Latina Calcio.

The team reached the Lega Pro Prima Divisione for the first time in 29 years, after being promoted from the Lega Pro Seconda Divisione group C in the 2010–11 season. In 2013, they were promoted to Serie B.

On 21 April 2013, the club won its first trophy, the 2012–13 Coppa Italia Lega Pro, after defeating Viareggio in the finals.

Their first Serie B season ended up in third place and eventually losing in the play-off final against Cesena.

At the end of the 2016–17 Serie B season, the club was declared bankrupt after failing to find a new buyer, with debts of over €6 million, meaning a new incarnation of Latina would have to begin from the amateur leagues. The club was refounded as Latina Calcio 1932 and competed in Serie D for the 2017–18 season. In August 2021, the club was one of four invited into Serie C to replace four that had been excluded.

== Colours and badge ==
The team's colours are black and blue.

Logo of predecessor A.S. Latina

Logo of predecessor U.S. Latina Calcio

== Current squad ==
As of 02 September 2026.

Note: Flags indicate national team as defined under FIFA eligibility rules; some limited exceptions apply. Players may hold more than one non-FIFA nationality.

No.	Pos.	Nation	Player
1	GK	ITA	Matteo Basti
2	DF	ITA	Emanuel Ercolano
3	MF	ITA	Mattia Porro
4	DF	ITA	Antonio De Cristofaro (on loan from Avellino)
5	DF	ITA	Matteo Bruscagin
6	DF	ITA	Bernardo Calabrese
7	MF	URU	Jaime Báez
8	DF	ITA	Gianmarco Castorri (on loan from Cesena)
9	FW	SEN	Youssouph Cheikh Sylla
10	MF	ITA	Alessio Riccardi
13	DF	ITA	Filippo Marenco
14	FW	ITA	Luca Gagliano
16	DF	ITA	Christian Sussi
19	FW	ITA	Gabriele Di Giovannantonio

No.	Pos.	Nation	Player
27	MF	ITA	Sonny D'Angelo
28	FW	ITA	Vincenzo Plescia
30	MF	ARG	Rodrigo De Ciancio
32	DF	ITA	Giulio Parodi
33	DF	ITA	Luigi Carillo
36	MF	ITA	Iacopo Lipani
45	DF	MLI	Cheick Keita
66	DF	ITA	Davide De Marchi
67	GK	ITA	Davide Mastrantonio
70	FW	ITA	Giacomo Tomaselli
77	FW	ITA	Antonio Cioffi
96	GK	ITA	Christian Sbaccanti
99	FW	ITA	Andrea Lo Bianco

Not asssigned a squadnumber as of 02.09.2026

Note: Flags indicate national team as defined under FIFA eligibility rules; some limited exceptions apply. Players may hold more than one non-FIFA nationality.

No.	Pos.	Nation	Player
—	GK	ITA	Alessandro Iosa
—	DF	ITA	Federico Pace
—	MF	CUB	Diego Catasus

=== Out on loan ===
Note: Flags indicate national team as defined under FIFA eligibility rules; some limited exceptions apply. Players may hold more than one non-FIFA nationality.

No.	Pos.	Nation	Player

== Managers ==
- (Argentina) (Italy) Francisco Lojacono (1972–73)
- (Italy) Lamberto Leonardi (1976–79)
- (Italy) Giorgio Puia (1983–84)
- (Italy) Andrea Agostinelli (1994–95)
- (Italy) Stefano Di Chiara (1994–95)
- (Italy) Roberto Rambaudi (2004)
- (Italy) Fabio Pecchia (2012–13)
- (Italy) Roberto Breda (2013–14)
- (Italy) Mario Beretta (2014)
- (Italy) Roberto Breda (2014–15)
- (Italy) Mark Iuliano (2015)
- (Italy) Mario Somma (2015–16)
- (Italy) Carmine Gautieri (2016)
- (Italy) Vincenzo Vivarini (2016–17)
- (Italy) Andrea Chiappini (2017–18)
- (Italy) Carlo Pascucci (2017–18)
- (Italy) Carmine Parlato (2018–19)
- (Italy) Raffaele Di Napoli (2018–19)
- (Italy) Agenore Maurizi (2019–20)
- (Italy) Raffaele Scudieri (2020–21)
- (Italy) Salvatore Ciullo (2020-21)
- (Italy) Raffaele Scudieri (2020-21)
- (Italy) Daniele Di Donato (2021-24)
- (Italy) Gaetano Fontana (2024)
- (Italy) Pasquale Padalino (2024)
- (Italy) Roberto Boscaglia (2024-25)
- (Italy) Allesandro Bruno (2025)
- (Italy) Gennaro Volpe (2025- )

== Honours ==
- Coppa Italia Serie C
  - Winners: 2012–13
- Lega Pro Seconda Divisione
  - Winners: 2010–11 (group C)
