= Aminata Zerbo-Sabané =

Burkinabe politician

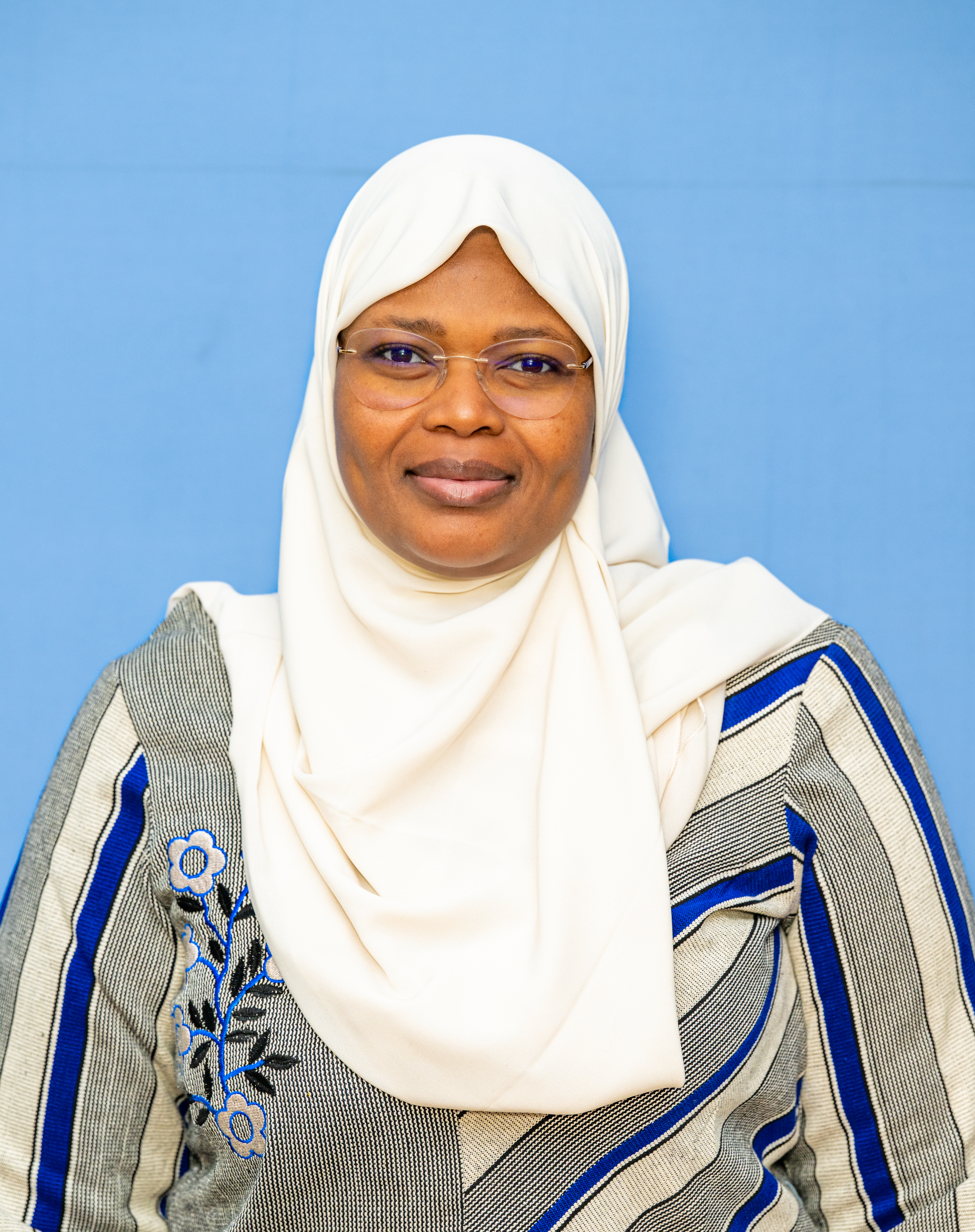
- Sabane in 2026

Minister of Digital Transition, Posts, and Electronic Communications
- Incumbent
- Assumed office 5 March 2022
- President: Paul-Henri Sandaogo Damiba; Ibrahim Traoré
- Prime Minister: Albert Ouédraogo; Apollinaire J. Kyélem de Tambèla
- Preceded by: Hadja Fatimata Ouattara

Personal details
- Born: 1 January 1979 (age 47) Abidjan, Ivory Coast
- Education: École supérieure d'information Polytechnique Montréal
- Occupation: Computer scientist, educator, politician
- Known for: Minister of Digital Transition, Posts, and Electronic Communications

Aminata Zerbo-Sabané (born January 1, 1979, in Abidjan, Ivory Coast), is a computer scientist, educator, and Burkinabe politician. Following the January and September 2022 coups d'état in Burkina Faso, she assumed the role of Minister of Digital Transition, Posts, and Electronic Communications in the transitional governments led by Paul-Henri Sandaogo Damiba and Ibrahim Traoré.

== Biography ==
=== Early life and education ===
Aminata Zerbo-Sabané attended a technical high school in Abidjan. She earned her baccalaureate in 2000 and pursued higher education at the École supérieure d'information in Burkina Faso. Obtaining a degree in computer engineering with a specialization in programming analysis in 2003, followed by a computer design engineering degree in 2006, she then enrolled at École Polytechnique de Montréal in Canada. In 2015, she received her doctorate in computer engineering. Joining Joseph-Ki Zerbo University in 2017 as a teacher-researcher in computer science, she co-initiated and served as deputy coordinator of the university's digital incubator, incub@UO, which fosters and supports student startup projects.

Before assuming the position of Minister of Digital Transition, Posts, and Electronic Communications, she served as the director of the National Agency for the Promotion of Information and Communication Technologies (ANPTIC).

== Career ==
Aminata Zerbo-Sabané coordinates various sectoral projects, including the e-Burkina project, the ICT development support project, and the unique identification project for regional integration and inclusion in West Africa (WURI). She is actively involved in professional and scientific associations, serving as a member of IEEE Burkina (an international scholarly society focusing on research in electronic and computer systems) and the network of teachers and researchers in computer science of Burkina (Rcif).
