= Gennaro Volpe =

Italian footballer and coach

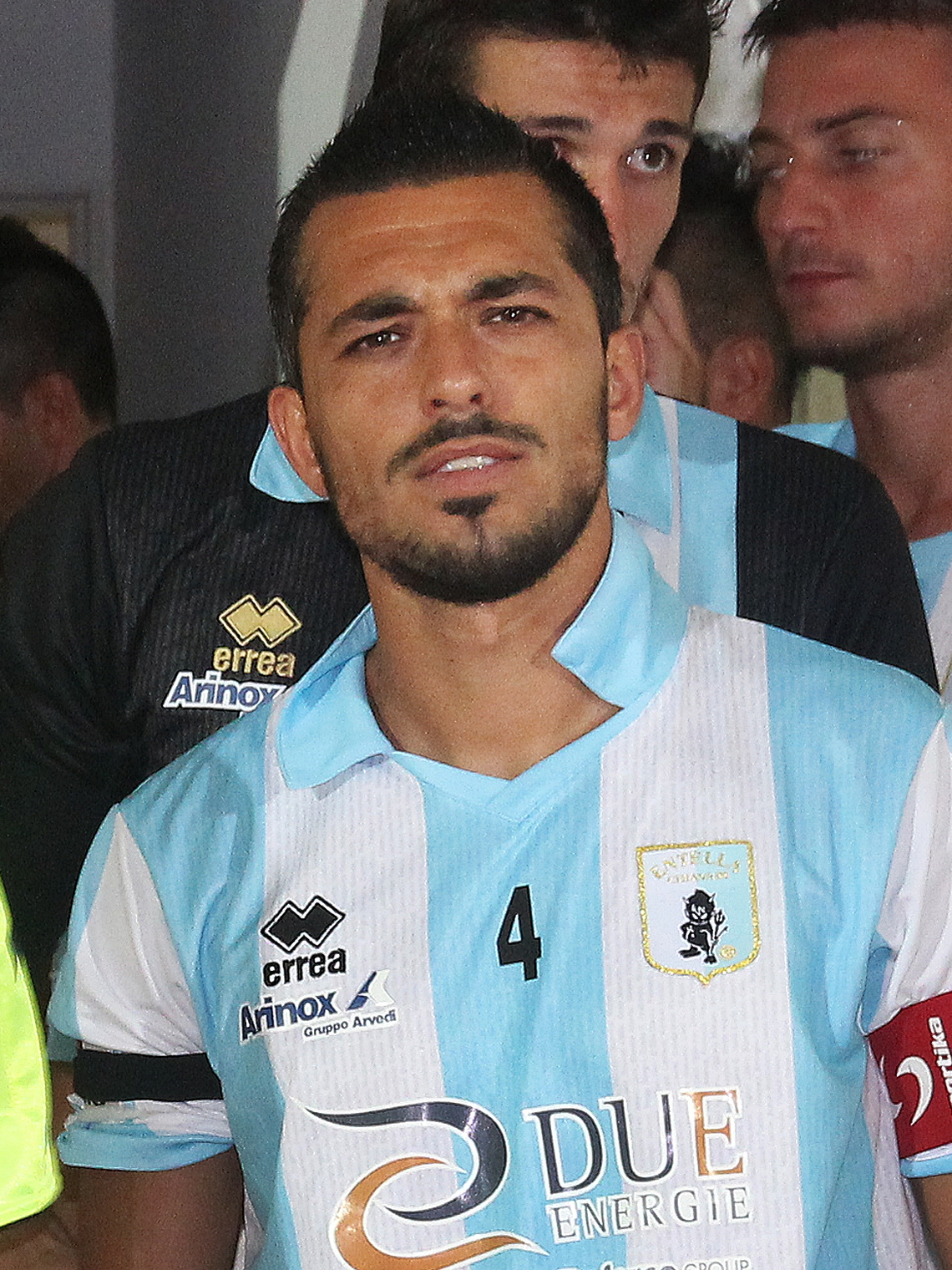
- Volpe with Virtus Entella

Personal information
- Date of birth: 17 February 1981 (age 45)
- Place of birth: Pozzuoli, Italy
- Height: 1.73 m (5 ft 8 in)
- Position: Midfielder

Team information
- Current team: Latina (head coach)

Senior career*
Years	Team	Apps	(Gls)
1999–2000	Empoli	0	(0)
2000–2001	Prato	25	(1)
2001	Ascoli	5	(0)
2002–2006	Mantova	108	(4)
2006–2011	Cittadella	161	(4)
2011–2016	Virtus Entella	142	(2)

Managerial career
- 2018: Virtus Entella
- 2021–2023: Virtus Entella
- 2024–2025: Lecco
- 2025–: Latina
- * Club domestic league appearances and goals

Gennaro Volpe (born 17 February 1981) is an Italian football coach and former player, currently in charge of Serie C Group B club Latina.

== Playing career ==
A former midfielder, he played for Empoli, Prato, Ascoli, Mantova and Cittadella. He retired in 2016 after five years at Virtus Entella.

== Coaching career ==
After retiring as a player, he stayed at Virtus Entella as a youth coach. On 6 May 2018, he was named new head coach in place of dismissed manager Alfredo Aglietti, taking over a Virtus Entella side in deep relegation trouble (20th place with two games to go). Virtus Entella were eventually relegated after losing a two-legged playoff to Ascoli. Volpe returned to coaching the Under-19 team afterwards.

On 12 April 2021, he was once again in charge of the first team, taking over from Vincenzo Vivarini as Virtus Entella was at the bottom of the Serie B league table with five games to go. Later on 1 May 2021, Virtus Entella were relegated to Serie C following a home loss to Vicenza, having achieved only a single point during Volpe's first three games in charge of the club.

After two Serie C seasons with Virtus Entella, failing to win promotion in both cases, Volpe was dismissed on 17 September 2023, one day after a home loss to neighbouring rivals Sestri Levante.

On 29 October 2024, Volpe was signed as the new head coach of Serie C club Lecco. He was dismissed on 2 February 2025 due to negative results. On 2 December 2025, Volpe signed as the new head coach of Serie C club Latina.

== Managerial statistics ==
As of match played 11 February 2023

Managerial record by team and tenure
Team	Nat	From	To	Record							
Team	Nat	From	To	G	W	D	L	GF	GA	GD	Win %
Virtus Entella	(Italy)	6 May 2018	10 July 2018	4	1	2	1	1	1	+0	25.00
Virtus Entella	(Italy)	12 April 2021	17 September 2023	103	51	22	30	126	87	+39	49.51
Lecco	(Italy)	29 October 2024	2 February 2025	14	2	5	7	13	23	−10	14.29
Latina	(Italy)	2 December 2025		28	11	8	9	36	30	+6	39.29
Total				149	65	37	47	221	179	+42	43.62
