= Daniele Borra =

Italian footballer (born 1995)

Personal information
- Date of birth: 28 July 1995 (age 31)
- Place of birth: Chivasso, Italy
- Height: 1.92 m (6 ft 3 1/2 in)
- Position: Goalkeeper

Youth career
- –2012: Valenzana
- 2012–2014: Virtus Entella
- 2013–2014: → Hellas Verona (loan)

Senior career*
Years	Team	Apps	(Gls)
2011–2012	Valenzana	0	(0)
2012–2023	Virtus Entella	66	(0)
2013–2014	→ Hellas Verona (loan)	0	(0)
2014–2015	→ Lucchese (loan)	0	(0)
2015	→ Taranto (loan)	2	(0)
2016–2017	→ Arezzo (loan)	38	(0)
2018–2019	→ Carrarese (loan)	48	(0)
2023–2025	Arezzo	7	(0)
2025–2026	Ravenna	0	(0)
2026	Südtirol	0	(0)
- * Club domestic league appearances and goals as of 8 May 2026

Daniele Borra (born 28 July 1995) is an Italian professional footballer who plays as a goalkeeper.

== Club career ==
He made his Serie C debut for Arezzo on 25 November 2016 in a game against Giana Erminio.

On 6 August 2018, he was signed by Carrarese on loan.

On 4 July 2023, he returned to Arezzo on permanent basis.

On 2 February 2026, Borra joined Südtirol in Serie B until 30 June 2026.
