= Michele Pellizzer =

Italian footballer

Personal information
- Date of birth: 22 May 1989 (age 37)
- Place of birth: Asolo, Italy
- Height: 1.85 m (6 ft 1 in)
- Position: Centre back

Team information
- Current team: Cjarlins Muzane

Youth career
- 2006–2007: Bassano Virtus

Senior career*
Years	Team	Apps	(Gls)
2007–2011	Bassano Virtus	69	(0)
2011–2016	Cittadella	142	(3)
2015–2016	→ Virtus Entella (loan)	37	(2)
2016–2023	Virtus Entella	177	(8)
2023–	Cjarlins Muzane	0	(0)
- * Club domestic league appearances and goals as of 25 June 2017

Michele Pellizzer (born 22 May 1989) is an Italian footballer who plays as a central defender for Serie D club Cjarlins Muzane.

== Club career ==
Born in Asolo, Pellizzer made his senior debuts with Bassano Virtus in Serie C2. In the 2009–10 season he was a part of the squad who won promotion, and after being regularly used in the following season he joined Cittadella.

On 27 August 2011, Pellizzer made his Serie B debut, starting in a 2–1 home win over AlbinoLeffe; his first goal only came on 1 December 2012, netting his side's only of a 1–1 draw at Juve Stabia.

In July 2013, Pellizzer became the captain at Cittadella replacing former captain Alex Cordaz.

On 8 July 2023, Pellizzer signed with Cjarlins Muzane in Serie D.
