= Aminata Aidara =

Italian-Senegalese journalist and writer

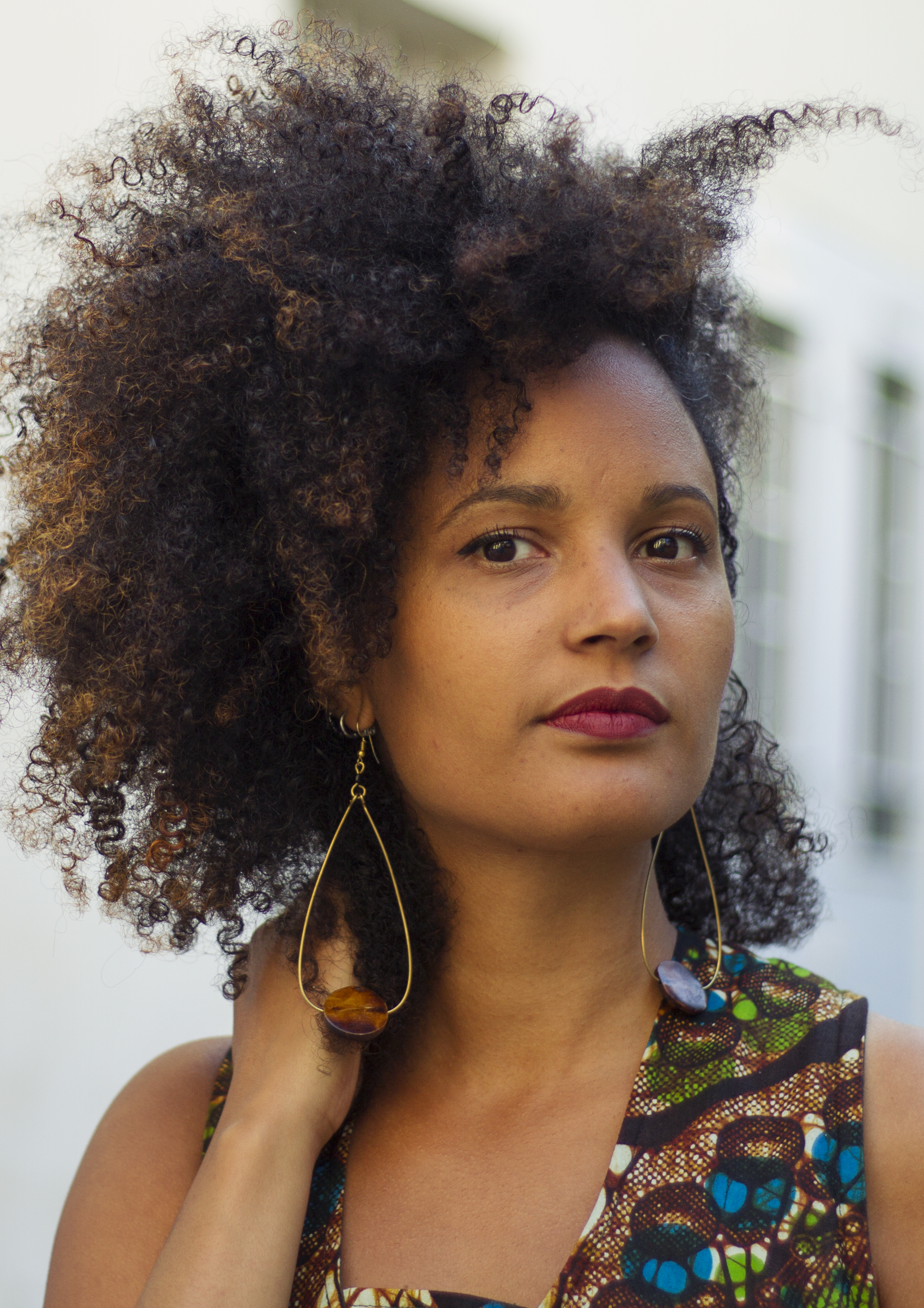
- Aminata Aidara, in 2018
- Born: 20 May 1984 (age 42); Aosta, Italy
- Education: Sorbonne Paris Cité University; University of Turin
- Occupations: Journalist, novelist
- Website: aminataaidara.com

Aminata Aidara (born 20 May 1984) is an Italian-Senegalese journalist, short story writer and novelist.

== Biography ==
Aidara was born in 1984 to an Italian mother and a Senegalese father. She is of Fula, Mandinka and Sardinian descent.

She studied French literature and comparative literature at the Sorbonne Paris Cité University in a partnership with the University of Turin, earning a doctor's degree in 2016 thanks to her research thesis about young French writers of immigrant background (Exister à bout de plume, la littérature des jeunes générations françaises issues de l'immigration au prisme de l'anthropologie littéraire). To complete this work, she had launched the project Exister à bout de plume in 2011, which resulted in a literary contest and in the edition of several works by young writers of immigrant background.

Since 2009, Aidara has authored several short stories in French and Italian. Her 2014 short story collection La ragazza dal cuore di carta (La Fille au cœur du papier in French) was awarded the Premio Chiara inediti in 2014. Besides, she worked as a literary critic and interview journalist for the French-language magazine Africultures. In 2018, Éditions Gallimard published Aidara's first novel, Je suis quelqu'un, the narrative of a family scattered between France and Senegal and a reflection on family origins.
