= 2013 Torneo di Viareggio =

2013 Viareggio Cup World Football Tournament Coppa Carnevale
65° Torneo di Viareggio

Tournament details
- Host country: Italy
- City: Viareggio
- Dates: 11 February 2013 – 25 February 2013
- Teams: 48

Final positions
- Champions: (Belgium) Anderlecht (1st title)
- Runners-up: (Italy) Milan

Tournament statistics
- Matches played: 87
- Goals scored: 262 (3.01 per match)
- Top scorer(s): (Italy) Simone Ganz (Italy) Luigi Canotto (Italy) Eric Lanini (Hungary) Gergely Bobál (Paraguay) Daniel Jara Martínez (5)

The 2013 Torneo di Viareggio is the 65th edition of Torneo di Viareggio (in English, the "Viareggio Tournament"; officially the "iareggio Cup World Football Tournament Coppa Carnevale"), the annual youth football tournament held in Viareggio, Tuscany.

== Format ==
The 48 teams are seeded in 12 pools, split up into 6-pool groups. Each team from a pool meets the others in a single tie. The winning club from each pool and two best runners-up from both group A and group B progress to the final knockout stage. All matches in the final rounds are single tie. The Round of 16 after envisions penalties and no extra time, while the rest of the final round matches include 30 minutes extra time and penalties to be played if the draw between teams still holds.

== Participating teams ==
48 teams participate in the tournament. The list of the teams are below.

Italian teams

- (Italy) Atalanta
- (Italy) Avellion
- (Italy) Città di Marino
- (Italy) Empoli
- (Italy) Fiorentina
- (Italy) Genoa
- (Italy) Inter Milan
- (Italy) Juve Stabia
- (Italy) Juventus
- (Italy) Lazio
- (Italy) Lecce
- (Italy) Milan
- (Italy) Napoli
- (Italy) Padova
- (Italy) Parma
- (Italy) Serie D Representatives
- (Italy) Reggina
- (Italy) Roma
- (Italy) Sampdoria
- (Italy) Siena
- (Italy) Spezia
- (Italy) Torino
- (Italy) Varese
- (Italy) Virtus Entella

European teams

- (Belgium) Anderlecht
- (Denmark) B 93 Copenhagen
- (North Macedonia) Belasica
- (Belgium) Club Brugge
- (Norway) Hønefoss
- (Hungary) Budapest Honvéd
- (Slovenia) Maribor
- (England) Newcastle United
- (Spain) Recreativo Huelva
- (Croatia) Rijeka
- (Russia) Spartak Moscow
- (Serbia) Red Star Belgrade

American teams

- (Argentina) All Boys
- (Paraguay) Club Nacional
- (Chile) Deportes Concepción
- (Ecuador) Norte América
- (United States) LIAC New York
- (United States) Long Island
- (Uruguay) Mutual Uruguaya
- (Mexico) Santos Laguna

African teams

- (Egypt) Nogoom El Mostakbal
- (Democratic Republic of the Congo) Congo U-17

Oceanian teams

- (Australia) APIA Leichhardt
- (Australia) Melbourne Phoenix

== Group stage ==
=== Group A ===
==== Pool 1 ====
Team	Pld	W	D	L	GF	GA	GD	Pts
(Italy) Juventus	3	2	1	0	6	3	+3	7
(Italy) Avellino	3	1	1	1	5	5	0	4
(Slovenia) Maribor	3	1	0	2	8	6	+2	3
(Australia) APIA Leichhardt	3	0	2	1	2	7	−5	2

11 February 2013
15:00 (CET)

Juventus (Italy)	4–2	(Slovenia) Maribor
Lanini 24', 29', 41'; Beltrame 45'	Report	Vuklisevic 32', 79'

11 February 2013
18:00 (CET)

Avellino (Italy)	2–2	(Australia) APIA Leichhardt
Amedoro 54', 85'	Report	Taneski 33'; Micevski 44'

13 February 2013
15:00 (CET)

Maribor (Slovenia)	5–0	(Australia) APIA Leichhardt
Zahovic 6', 44'; Stojanović 9', 78'; Šauperl 46'	Report

13 February 2013
15:00 (CET)

Juventus (Italy)	2–1	(Italy) Avellino
Lanini 18', 89'	Report	Pellegrino 27'

15 February 2013
15:00 (CET)

Juventus (Italy)	0–0	(Australia) APIA Leichhardt
	Report

15 February 2013
15:00 (CET)

Maribor (Slovenia)	1–2	(Italy) Avellino
Stojanović 22'	Report	Pellegrino 38'; Amedoro 51'

==== Pool 2 ====
Team	Pld	W	D	L	GF	GA	GD	Pts
(Italy) Inter Milan	3	3	0	0	7	0	+7	9
(Italy) Virtus Entella	3	2	0	1	8	1	+7	6
(Egypt) Nogoom El Mostakbal	3	1	0	2	4	8	−4	3
(Australia) Melbourne Phoenix	3	0	0	3	1	11	−10	0

11 February 2013
15:00 (CET)

Inter Milan (Italy)	3–0	(Egypt) Nogoom El Mostakbal
Djumo 4'; Mbaye 67'; Gabbianelli 87'	Report

11 February 2013
16:00 (CET)

Virtus Entella (Italy)	4–0	(Australia) Melbourne Phoenix
Rubino 1', 32', 70' (pen.); Amorfini 90'	Report

13 February 2013
15:00 (CET)

Nogoom El Mostakbal (Egypt)	4–1	(Australia) Melbourne Phoenix
Selim Mohamed 10'; Mahmoud Mageid 38'; Tarik Abduo 50'; Ahmed Abdou 88'	Report	Carter 66'

13 February 2013
17:30 (CET)

Inter Milan (Italy)	1–0	(Italy) Virtus Entella
Terrani 20'	Report

15 February 2013
15:00 (CET)

Inter Milan (Italy)	3–0	(Australia) Melbourne Phoenix
Colombi 6', 45'; Garritano 31' (pen.)	Report

15 February 2013
15:00 (CET)

Nogoom El Mostakbal (Egypt)	0–4	(Italy) Virtus Entella
	Report	Bonaventura 10'; Pellegrino 38'; Damiani 48'; Rubino 55'

==== Pool 3 ====
Team	Pld	W	D	L	GF	GA	GD	Pts
(Italy) Torino	3	3	0	0	16	0	+16	9
(Italy) Città di Marino	3	2	0	1	5	5	0	6
(Chile) Deportes Concepción	3	1	0	2	6	4	+2	3
(Norway) Hønefoss	3	0	0	3	0	18	−18	0

11 February 2013
15:00 (CET)

Città di Marino (Italy)	1–0	(Chile) Deportes Concepción
Indelicato 76'	Report

11 February 2013
20:00 (CET)

Torino (Italy)	8–0	(Norway) Hønefoss
Diop 2'; Menga 8'; Coccolo 24'; Kabasele 38', 52', 89'; Diarra 42'; Fumana 56'	Report

13 February 2013
15:00 (CET)

Torino (Italy)	5–0	(Italy) Città di Marino
Ignico 35'; Barbosa 73', 83', 90+2'; Parigini 88'	Report

13 February 2013
15:00 (CET)

Hønefoss (Norway)	0–6	(Chile) Deportes Concepción
	Report	Cardoso Ayala 20'; De Lacerda 26'; Leiva 31'; Muñoz Contreras 40'; Poblete Ossorio 86', 88'

15 February 2013
15:00 (CET)

Hønefoss (Norway)	0–4	(Italy) Città di Marino
	Report	Arcobelli 7'; Indelicato 38', 58', 75'

15 February 2013
15:00 (CET)

Torino (Italy)	3–0	(Chile) Deportes Concepción
da Silva 23' (pen.); Kabasele 50'; Fumana 87' (pen.)	Report

==== Pool 4 ====
Team	Pld	W	D	L	GF	GA	GD	Pts
(Argentina) All Boys	3	2	1	0	5	2	+3	7
(Italy) Sampdoria	3	1	1	1	4	5	−1	4
(Spain) Recreativo Huelva	3	1	0	2	2	3	−1	3
(Italy) Varese	3	0	2	1	4	5	−1	2

11 February 2013
15:00 (CET)

Varese (Italy)	1–1	(Argentina) All Boys
Kiakis 8'	Report	Fernandez 50'

11 February 2013
18:00 (CET)

Sampdoria (Italy)	1–0	(Spain) Recreativo Huelva
Austoni 86'	Report

13 February 2013
15:00 (CET)

Recreativo Huelva (Spain)	0–1	(Argentina) All Boys
	[ Report]	Di Placido 90+3'

13 February 2013
17:00 (CET)

Sampdoria (Italy)	2–2	(Italy) Varese
Ghiglia 26'; Luperini 61'	Report	Zamparo 54'; Forte 80'

15 February 2013
15:00 (CET)

Recreativo Huelva (Spain)	2–1	(Italy) Varese
García 34' (pen.); Quintana 53'	Report	Bruzzone 63'

15 February 2013
15:00 (CET)

Sampdoria (Italy)	1–3	(Argentina) All Boys
Pfrunder 55'	Report	Calleri 20'; Madera 37'; Espindola 90'

==== Pool 5 ====
Team	Pld	W	D	L	GF	GA	GD	Pts
(Italy) Genoa	3	2	0	1	5	4	+1	6
(Italy) Parma	3	2	0	1	5	4	+1	6
(Mexico) Santos Laguna	3	1	0	2	6	4	+2	3
(Croatia) Rijeka	3	1	0	2	4	8	−4	3

11 February 2013
15:00 (CET)

Genoa (Italy)	1–3	(Croatia) Rijeka
Jara Martínez 56'	Report	Solomon 23'; Polic 28' (pen.); Marcius 71'

11 February 2013
17:00 (CET)

Parma (Italy)	2–1	(Mexico) Santos Laguna
Campagna 72'; Cerri 80' (pen.)	Report	Tavano 21'

13 February 2013
15:00 (CET)

Genoa (Italy)	2–1	(Italy) Parma
Jara Martínez 8', 29'	Report	Lauricella 76'

13 February 2013
15:00 (CET)

Rijeka (Croatia)	0–5	(Mexico) Santos Laguna
	Report	Sandoval 6', 48', 61'; Najera 31'; Tovar 69'

15 February 2013
15:00 (CET)

Genoa (Italy)	2–0	(Mexico) Santos Laguna
Alhassan 62'; Velocci 88'	Report

15 February 2013
15:00 (CET)

Rijeka (Croatia)	1–2	(Italy) Parma
Polic 30' (pen.)	Report	Storani 48'; Cerri 49'

==== Pool 6 ====
Team	Pld	W	D	L	GF	GA	GD	Pts
(Belgium) Anderlecht	3	2	0	1	3	1	+2	6
(Italy) Serie D Representatives	3	1	1	1	4	4	0	4
(Italy) Reggina	3	1	1	1	3	4	−1	4
(Ecuador) Club Sport Norte América	3	1	0	2	2	3	−1	3

11 February 2013
15:00 (CET)

Serie D Representatives (Italy)	0–1	(Belgium) Anderlecht
	Report	Heylen 45'

11 February 2013
17:00 (CET)

Reggina (Italy)	1–0	(Ecuador) Club Sport Norte América
Catanese 27'	Report

13 February 2013
15:00 (CET)

Serie D Representatives (Italy)	2–2	(Italy) Reggina
Gatto 14'; Bussi 31'	Report	Akaku 72'; Ammirati 85'

13 February 2013
15:00 (CET)

Anderlecht (Belgium)	0–1	(Ecuador) Club Sport Norte América
	Report	Preciado 21'

15 February 2013
15:00 (CET)

Anderlecht (Belgium)	2–0	(Italy) Reggina
Lukaku 19'; Acheampong 32'	Report

15 February 2013
15:00 (CET)

Serie D Representatives (Italy)	2–1	(Ecuador) Club Sport Norte América
Idromela 69'; Gabrielloni 83'	Report	Guevara 40'

=== Group B ===
==== Pool 7 ====
Team	Pld	W	D	L	GF	GA	GD	Pts
(Italy) Siena	3	3	0	0	3	0	+3	9
(Italy) Atalanta	3	2	0	1	6	1	+5	6
(Belgium) Club Brugge	3	1	0	2	3	5	−2	3
(North Macedonia) Belasica	3	0	0	3	0	6	−6	0

12 February 2013
15:00 (CET)

Siena (Italy)	1–0	(Belgium) Club Brugge
Rosseti 63'	Report

12 February 2013
15:00 (CET)

Atalanta (Italy)	2–0	(North Macedonia) Belasica
Mangni 21'; Olausson 65'	Report

14 February 2013
15:00 (CET)

Belasica (North Macedonia)	0–3	(Belgium) Club Brugge
	Report	Dierckx 8'; Gano 40'; Verstraete 86'

14 February 2013
17:30 (CET)

Atalanta (Italy)	0–1	(Italy) Siena
	Report	Canotto 78' (pen.)

16 February 2013
15:00 (CET)

Belasica (North Macedonia)	0–1	(Italy) Siena
	Report	Canotto 82' (pen.)

16 February 2013
15:00 (CET)

Atalanta (Italy)	4–0	(Belgium) Club Brugge
Mangni 35', 50'; Varano 69', 75'	Report

==== Pool 8 ====
Team	Pld	W	D	L	GF	GA	GD	Pts
(Italy) Fiorentina	3	2	1	0	10	2	+8	7
(Italy) Padova	3	1	2	0	3	1	+2	5
(Denmark) B 93 Copenhagen	3	1	0	2	5	11	−6	3
(Paraguay) Club Nacional	3	0	1	2	2	6	−4	1

12 February 2013
15:00 (CET)

Padova (Italy)	1–1	(Paraguay) Club Nacional
Mbacke 38'	Report	Montiel 29'

12 February 2013
15:00 (CET)

Fiorentina (Italy)	8–2	(Denmark) B 93 Copenhagen
Bernardeschi 20', 52', 85'; Empereur 22'; Zohore 42'; Madrigali 57'; Fossati 90+3' (pen.); Gondo 90+4'	Report	Memeti 9'; Bertelsen 18'

14 February 2013
15:00 (CET)

Fiorentina (Italy)	0–0	(Italy) Padova
	Report

14 February 2013
15:00 (CET)

B 93 Copenhagen (Denmark)	3–1	(Paraguay) Club Nacional
Nielsen 11'; Drost 75'	Report	Alfonso 87'

16 February 2013
15:00 (CET)

B 93 Copenhagen (Denmark)	0–2	(Italy) Padova
	Report	Voltan 28'; Magrassi 80'

16 February 2013
15:00 (CET)

Fiorentina (Italy)	2–0	(Paraguay) Club Nacional
Gondo 38'; Bernardeschi 75'	Report

==== Pool 9 ====
Team	Pld	W	D	L	GF	GA	GD	Pts
(Italy) Milan	3	2	1	0	4	2	+2	7
(England) Newcastle United	3	2	0	1	6	5	+1	6
(Italy) Empoli	3	1	0	2	5	4	+1	3
(Democratic Republic of the Congo) Congo U-17	3	0	1	2	2	6	−4	1

12 February 2013
15:00 (CET)

Empoli (Italy)	3–0	(Democratic Republic of the Congo) Congo U-17
Rovini 16'; Silvetri 81'; Bencini 84'	Report

12 February 2013
17:00 (CET)

Milan (Italy)	2–1	(England) Newcastle United
Cristante 9'; Pedone 64'	Report	Quinn 90+1'

14 February 2013
15:00 (CET)

Newcastle United (England)	2–1	(Democratic Republic of the Congo) Congo U-17
Gilliead 75'; Olley 90+2'	Report	Andzouana 89'

14 February 2013
17:00 (CET)

Milan (Italy)	1–0	(Italy) Empoli
Ganz 56'	Report

16 February 2013
15:00 (CET)

Newcastle United (England)	3–2	(Italy) Empoli
Honey 2'; Quinn 31'; Booth 67'	Report	Bachini 24'; Ruin 65'

16 February 2013
17:00 (CET)

Milan (Italy)	1–1	(Democratic Republic of the Congo) Congo U-17
Prosenik 13'	Report	Bidimbou 63'

==== Pool 10 ====
Team	Pld	W	D	L	GF	GA	GD	Pts
(Italy) Napoli	3	3	0	0	8	0	+8	9
(Hungary) Budapest Honvéd	3	2	0	1	10	5	+5	6
(Italy) Lecce	3	1	0	2	4	6	−2	3
(United States) LIAC New York	3	0	0	3	2	13	−11	0

12 February 2013
15:00 (CET)

Napoli (Italy)	2–0	(Hungary) Budapest Honvéd
Insigne 30'; Fornito 54'	Report

12 February 2013
15:00 (CET)

Lecce (Italy)	3–0	(United States) LIAC New York
Rosafio 18', 30'; Malcore 53' (pen.)	Report

14 February 2013
15:00 (CET)

Budapest Honvéd (Hungary)	8–2	(United States) LIAC New York
Vécsei 4', 23', 26'; Bobál 45', 48', 55', 72'; Holender 77'	Report	Stulac 45+1', 63'

14 February 2013
15:15 (CET)

Napoli (Italy)	4–0	(Italy) Lecce
Radošević 27', 81'; Scielzo 56', 60'	Report

16 February 2013
15:00 (CET)

Budapest Honvéd (Hungary)	2–1	(Italy) Lecce
Holender 60'; Bobál 90+2'	Report	Rosafio 31'

16 February 2013
15:00 (CET)

Napoli (Italy)	2–0	(United States) LIAC New York
Di Stasio 15'; Guardiglio 82' (pen.)	Report

==== Pool 11 ====
Team	Pld	W	D	L	GF	GA	GD	Pts
(Italy) Spezia	3	2	1	0	8	3	+5	7
(Italy) Roma	3	2	0	1	9	3	+6	6
(Russia) Spartak Moscow	3	1	1	1	7	5	+2	4
(United States) Long Island	3	0	0	3	2	15	−13	0

12 February 2013
14:45 (CET)

Roma (Italy)	3–0	(Russia) Spartak Moscow
Bumba 11', 31'; Marciel 80'	Report

12 February 2013
15:30 (CET)

Spezia (Italy)	4–1	(United States) Long Island
Franco 24' (pen.); Galiera 48'; Passamonti 52'; Tabiolati 90+4'	Report	Massiah 66'

14 February 2013
15:00 (CET)

Roma (Italy)	0–2	(Italy) Spezia
	Report	Ciurria 32'; Izzilo 69'

14 February 2013
15:00 (CET)

Spartak Moscow (Russia)	5–0	(United States) Long Island
Makhmudov 2'; Davydov 6'; Fedchuk 15'; Kutepov 28'; Samsonov 45'	Report

16 February 2013
15:00 (CET)

Roma (Italy)	6–1	(United States) Long Island
Ricci 24' (pen.); Ferrante 40'; Ferri 81', 86'; Musto 90', 90+4'	Report	Cortez 67' (pen.)

16 February 2013
15:00 (CET)

Spartak Moscow (Russia)	2–2	(Italy) Spezia
Krotov 53'; Svyatov 85'	Report	Passamonti 54'; Ciurria 87'

==== Pool 12 ====
Team	Pld	W	D	L	GF	GA	GD	Pts
(Italy) Lazio	3	3	0	0	9	3	+6	9
(Italy) Juve Stabia	3	2	0	1	10	4	+6	6
(Uruguay) Mutual Uruguaya	3	1	0	2	1	5	−4	3
(Serbia) Red Star Belgrade	3	0	0	3	0	8	−8	0

12 February 2013
15:00 (CET)

Juve Stabia (Italy)	1–4	(Uruguay) Mutual Uruguaya
Favetta 62' (pen.)	Report	Enriguez 19' (pen.), 33'; Santos 51'; Lemos 70'

- Juve Stabia were awarded a 3–0 win in the game v Mutual Uruguaya even though they lost the game 1–4
12 February 2013
18:00 (CET)

Lazio (Italy)	3–0	(Serbia) Red Star Belgrade
Keita 30', 72'; Falasca 57' (pen.)	Report

14 February 2013
15:00 (CET)

Red Star Belgrade (Serbia)	0–1	(Uruguay) Mutual Uruguaya
	Report	Santos 20'

14 February 2013
18:00 (CET)

Lazio (Italy)	4–3	(Italy) Juve Stabia
Keita 12', 45+1'; Cataldi 25'; Pollace 83'	Report	Gerardi 29'; Festa 33'; Sorriso 73'

16 February 2013
15:00 (CET)

Red Star Belgrade (Serbia)	0–4	(Italy) Juve Stabia
	Report	Guarino 9'; Sorriso 14', 19'; Gerardi 57'

16 February 2013
15:00 (CET)

Lazio (Italy)	2–0	(Uruguay) Mutual Uruguaya
Rozzi 65', 89'	Report

== Ranking of second-placed teams ==
Team	Pld	W	D	L	GF	GA	GD	Pts
(Italy) Virtus Entella	3	2	0	1	8	1	+7	6
(Italy) Juve Stabia	3	2	0	1	10	4	+6	6
(Italy) Roma	3	2	0	1	5	3	+6	6
(Italy) Parma	3	2	0	1	5	4	+1	6
(Italy) Atalanta	3	2	0	1	5	1	+4	6
(England) Newcastle United	3	2	0	1	5	4	+1	6
(Italy) Città di Marino	3	2	0	1	5	5	0	6
(Italy) Padova	3	1	2	0	3	1	+2	5
(Hungary) Budapest Honvéd	3	1	1	1	9	5	+4	4
(Italy) Avellino	3	1	1	1	9	5	+4	4
(Italy) Sampdoria	3	1	1	1	4	5	−1	4
(Italy) Reggina	3	1	1	1	3	4	−1	4

== Final rounds ==
Round of 16
19 February (15:00 CET)
(Argentina) All Boys	1
(Italy) Milan	2
19 February (17:00 CET)
(Italy) Inter Milan	0
(Italy) Spezia	1
19 February (15:00 CET)
(Italy) ACF Fiorentina	0
(Italy) Parma	1
19 February (15:00 CET)
(Italy) Juventus	0
(Italy) Juve Stabia	1
19 February (15:00 CET)
(Italy) Napoli	1
(Italy) Genoa	2
19 February (17:00 CET)
(Italy) Siena	2
(Italy) Virtus Entella	0
19 February (15:00 CET)
(Italy) Torino	2
(Italy) Roma	1
19 February (15:00 CET)
(Italy) Lazio	0 (4)
(Belgium) Anderlecht	0 (5)

Quarter-finals
21 February (15:00 CET)
(Italy) Milan	3
(Italy) Spezia	0
21 February (17:00 CET)
(Italy) Parma	3
(Italy) Juve Stabia	1
21 February (15:00 CET)
(Italy) Genoa	1
(Italy) Siena	3
21 February (15:00 CET)
(Italy) Torino	0 (3)
(Belgium) Anderlecht	0 (4)

Semi-finals
23 February (15:00 CET)
(Italy) Milan	2
(Italy) Parma	1
23 February (17:00 CET)
(Belgium) Anderlecht	1
(Italy) Siena	0

Final
25 February (15:00 CET)
(Italy) Milan	0
(Belgium) Anderlecht	3

=== Round of 16 ===
19 February 2013
15:00 (CET)

All Boys (Argentina)	1–2	(Italy) Milan
Mazur 19'	[ Report]	Henty 14'; Ganz 70' (pen.)

19 February 2013
15:00 (CET)

Fiorentina (Italy)	0–0	(Italy) Parma
	[ Report]
Penalties
	3–4

19 February 2013
15:00 (CET)

Juventus (Italy)	0–1	(Italy) Juve Stabia
	[ Report]	Gargiulo 55'

19 February 2013
15:00 (CET)

Lazio (Italy)	0–0	(Belgium) Anderlecht
	[ Report]
Penalties
	4–5

19 February 2013
15:00 (CET)

Napoli (Italy)	1–1	(Italy) Genoa
Fornito 55'	[ Report]	Martínez 70'
Penalties
	7–8

19 February 2013
15:00 (CET)

Torino (Italy)	1–1	(Italy) Roma
Gyasi 38'	[ Report]	Ricci 23'
Penalties
	4–3

19 February 2013
17:00 (CET)

Inter Milan (Italy)	0–0	(Italy) Spezia
	[ Report]
Penalties
	0–3

19 February 2013
17:00 (CET)

Siena (Italy)	2–0	(Italy) Virtus Entella
Canotto 30'; Rosseti 63'	[ Report]

=== Quarter-finals ===
21 February 2013
(CET)

Milan (Italy)	3–0	(Italy) Spezia
Petagna 12', 45'; Ganz 13'	[ Report]

21 February 2013
(CET)

Parma (Italy)	3–1	(Italy) Juve Stabia
	[ Report]

21 February 2013
(CET)

Genoa (Italy)	1–3	(Italy) Siena
	[ Report]

21 February 2013
(CET)

Torino (Italy)	0–0	(Belgium) Anderlecht
	[ Report]
Penalties
	3–4

=== Semi-finals ===
23 February 2013
16:00 (CET)

Milan (Italy)	2–1	(Italy) Parma
Ganz 29', 61'	[ Report]	Lucarini 83' (o.g.)

23 February 2013
18:00 (CET)

Anderlecht (Belgium)	1–0	(Italy) Siena
D'Alberto 80'	[ Report]

=== Final ===
25 February 2013
15:00 (CET)

Milan (Italy)	0–3	(Belgium) Anderlecht
	[ Report]	Acheampong 50', 76'; Jaadi 90+3'

== Champions ==
Torneo di Viareggio 2013 Champions

R.S.C. Anderlecht
1st time

== Top scorers ==
5 goals (5 players)

- (Italy) Simone Ganz (Milan)
- (Italy) Luigi Canotto (Siena)
- (Italy) Eric Lanini (Juventus)
- (Hungary) Gergely Bobál (Budapest Honvéd)
- (Paraguay) Daniel Jara Martínez (Genoa)

4 goals (7 players)

- (Italy) Federico Bernardeschi (Fiorentina)
- (Senegal) Balde Diao Keita (Lazio)
- (Italy) Indelicato (Città di Marino)
- (Italy) Ambrogio Sorriso (Juve Stabia)
- (Italy) Rubino (Virtus Entella)
- (Belgium) Nathan Kabasele (Torino)
- (Brazil) Willyan da Silva Barbosa (Torino)

3 goals (8 players)

- (Italy) Amedoro (Avellino)
- (Italy) Doudou Mangni (Atalanta)
- (Hungary) Bálint Vécsei (Budapest Honvéd)
- (Italy) Valerio Rosseti (Siena)
- (Switzerland) Marco Rosafio (Lecce)
- (Ghana) Frank Acheampong (Anderlecht)
- (Mexico) Wálter Sandoval (Santos Laguna)
- (Slovenia) Petar Stojanović (Maribor)
