= List of Italian football transfers winter 2016–17 =

This is a list of Italian football transfers featuring at least one Serie A or Serie B club which were completed in the winter of the 2016–17 season. The winter transfer window opened on 1 January 2017, although a few transfers took place prior to that date. The window closed at midnight on 31 January 2017. Players without a club could join one at any time, either during or in between transfer windows, as long as the team registered them.

== Transfers ==
Legend

- Those clubs in Italic indicate that the player already left the team on loan this season or new signing that immediately left the club.

Date	Name	Moving from	Moving to	Fee
23 December 2016	(Colombia) Pablo Armero	Udinese	(Brazil) Bahia	Undisclosed
2 January 2017	Leonardo Pavoletti	Genoa	Napoli	Undisclosed
3 January 2017	(Venezuela) Tomás Rincón	Genoa	Juventus	€8+1M
3 January 2017	Guglielmo Stendardo	Atalanta	Pescara	Undisclosed
3 January 2017	Archimede Morleo	Bologna	Bari	Undisclosed
3 January 2017	Tommaso Costantini	Mezzolara	S.P.A.L.	Undisclosed
3 January 2017	Alberto Aquilani	Pescara	Sassuolo	Loan
3 January 2017	Mirko Eramo	Sampdoria	Benevento	Undisclosed
4 January 2017	Cesare Bovo	Torino	Pescara	Undisclosed
4 January 2017	(Spain) Iago Falque	Roma	Torino	Undisclosed (Note: The player already played for his new club in 2016–17 season, the deal turned from temporary to definitive.)
4 January 2017	(Poland) Bartosz Bereszyński	(Poland) Legia Warsaw	Sampdoria	Undisclosed
4 January 2017	(Paraguay) Juan Iturbe	Roma	Torino	Loan
4 January 2017	(Bosnia and Herzegovina) Milan Đurić	Cesena	(England) Bristol City	Undisclosed
4 January 2017	Alberto Cerri	Juventus	Pescara	Loan
4 January 2017	Ludovico Gargiulo	Empoli	Prato	Loan
5 January 2017	(Ivory Coast) Kouakou Kader	Torino	Carpi	Loan
5 January 2017	Gianmario Comi	Carpi	Pro Vercelli	Loan
5 January 2017	Andrea Beghetto	S.P.A.L.	Genoa	Undisclosed
5 January 2017	Mirko Pigliacelli	Pescara	Trapani	Loan
5 January 2017	Francesco Mele	Pescara	Torino	Undisclosed
5 January 2017	(Switzerland) Cephas Malele	Palermo	(Portugal) Varzim	Loan
5 January 2017	Luigi Grassi	S.P.A.L.	Pontedera	Undisclosed
5 January 2017	Giammario Piscitella	Roma	Prato	Loan
5 January 2017	Leonardo Morosini	Brescia	Genoa	Undisclosed
5 January 2017	(Venezuela) Adalberto Peñaranda	Udinese	(England) Watford	Loan return
5 January 2017	Andrea Ferretti	Trapani	FeralpiSalò	Undisclosed
5 January 2017	Marco Chiosa	Torino	Novara	Loan
5 January 2017	(Chile) Mauricio Pinilla	Atalanta	Genoa	Loan (Note: This is a deal with an obligation to automatically buy the player at the end of the loan)
7 January 2017	(Romania) Vasile Mogos	Reggiana	Ascoli	Undisclosed
8 January 2017	(Brazil) Caio De Cenco	Trapani	Padova	Undisclosed
8 January 2017	(Brazil) Felipe Melo	Inter	(Brazil) Palmeiras	Loan
8 January 2017	Matteo Scozzarella	Trapani	Parma	Undisclosed
9 January 2017	(Belgium) Benjamin Mokulu	Avellino	Frosinone	Loan
9 January 2017	Alberto Gilardino	Empoli	Pescara	Free
9 January 2017	Fausto Rossi	Unattached	Trapani	Free
9 January 2017	(Sweden) Stefan Silva	(Sweden) Sundsvall	Palermo	Free
9 January 2017	Roberto Zammarini	Mantova	Pisa	Undisclosed
9 January 2017	Kingsley Boateng	Bari	(Slovenia) Olimpija Ljubljana	Undisclosed
9 January 2017	Giovanni Mattera	Napoli	Virtus Entella	Loan
10 January 2017	(Morocco) Adel Taarabt	(Portugal) Benfica	Genoa	Loan
10 January 2017	(Slovenia) Luka Krajnc	Cagliari	Frosinone	Loan
10 January 2017	(Brazil) Carlão	(Cyprus) APOEL	Torino	Undisclosed
10 January 2017	(Montenegro) Stevan Jovetić	Inter	(Spain) Sevilla	Loan
10 January 2017	Riccardo Fiamozzi	Genoa	Frosinone	Loan
10 January 2017	Marco Storari	Cagliari	Milan	Undisclosed
10 January 2017	(Brazil) Gabriel	Milan	Cagliari	Loan
10 January 2017	Vittorio Parigini	Torino	Bari	Loan
10 January 2017	Fabio Morselli	Juventus	Carpi	Loan
10 January 2017	Antimo Iunco	Paganese	Cittadella	Free
10 January 2017	(Argentina) Adrián Cubas	(Argentina) Boca Juniors	Pescara	Loan
11 January 2017	Federico Maracchi	FeralpiSalò	Trapani	Undisclosed
11 January 2017	Roberto Gagliardini	Atalanta	Inter	18-month loan
11 January 2017	Stefano Mauri	Unattached	Brescia	Free
11 January 2017	Stefano Amadio	Latina	Teramo	Loan
11 January 2017	Alberto Brignoli	Juventus	Perugia	Loan
11 January 2017	Filippo Florio	Ascoli	Santarcangelo	Loan
11 January 2017	(Equatorial Guinea) Pepín	Roma	(Switzerland) Lugano	Loan
11 January 2017	Lorenzo Laverone	Salernitana	Avellino	Undisclosed
12 January 2017	(Croatia) Bruno Petković	Trapani	Bologna	Undisclosed
12 January 2017	(Croatia) Franjo Prce	Lazio	Brescia	18-month loan
12 January 2017	Roberto Insigne	Napoli	Latina	Loan
12 January 2017	Daniel Di Nicola	Pescara	Taranto	Loan
12 January 2017	Mattia Caldara	Atalanta	Juventus	€15+6+4M
12 January 2017	Mattia Caldara	Juventus	Atalanta	18-month loan
12 January 2017	(Brazil) Leandrinho	(Brazil) Ponte Preta	Napoli	R$2M
12 January 2017	Giovanni Terrani	Lucchese	Perugia	Undisclosed
12 January 2017	Gianluca Mancini	Perugia	Atalanta	Undisclosed
12 January 2017	Gianluca Mancini	Atalanta	Perugia	Loan
12 January 2017	Gennaro Armeno	Novara	Matera	Loan
13 January 2017	Pierluigi Gollini	(England) Aston Villa	Atalanta	18-month loan
13 January 2017	Danilo Cataldi	Lazio	Genoa	Loan
13 January 2017	(Argentina) Alan Martínez	Lecco	Ascoli	Free
13 January 2017	Marco Sportiello	Atalanta	Fiorentina	18-month loan
13 January 2017	(Senegal) Mame Baba Thiam	Juventus	Empoli	Loan
13 January 2017	Michele Franco	Salernitana	Livorno	Undisclosed
13 January 2017	Leonardo Sernicola	Ternana	Fondi	Loan
13 January 2017	Enzo Maresca	Verona	Unattached	Released
14 January 2017	(Brazil) Rubinho	Como	Genoa	Free
14 January 2017	Federico Angiulli	Reggiana	Pisa	Undisclosed
14 January 2017	Osarimen Ebagua	Pro Vercelli	Vicenza	Loan
14 January 2017	Simone Edera	Torino	Parma	Loan
14 January 2017	Federico Moretti	Latina	Avellino	Free
14 January 2017	Fabrizio Lasagna	Carpi	Udinese	Loan
14 January 2017	Fabrizio Lasagna	Udinese	Carpi	Loan
14 January 2017	Aniello Cutolo	Virtus Entella	Juve Stabia	Undisclosed
16 January 2017	Giuseppe Caccavallo	Salernitana	Venezia	Loan
16 January 2017	Nicolò Fazzi	Crotone	Perugia	Undisclosed
16 January 2017	(Cameroon) Didiba Joss	Perugia	Matera	Loan
16 January 2017	(Senegal) Layousse Diallo	Avellino	Casertana	Loan
16 January 2017	Andrea Caponi	Pisa	Pontedera	Undisclosed
16 January 2017	Raffaele Imparato	Perugia	Teramo	Undisclosed
16 January 2017	(France) Modibo Diakité	Unattached	Ternana	Free
16 January 2017	Gianni Munari	Cagliari	Parma	Undisclosed
16 January 2017	Mattia Montini	Monopoli	Bari	Undisclosed
16 January 2017	Mattia Montini	Bari	Monopoli	Loan
16 January 2017	Jacopo Furlan	Lumezzane	Bari	Undisclosed
16 January 2017	Jacopo Furlan	Bari	Monopoli	Loan
16 January 2017	Simone Zaza	Juventus	(Spain) Valencia	Loan
16 January 2017	Filippo Costa	Chievo	S.P.A.L.	Loan
16 January 2017	Andrea Cocco	Pescara	Cesena	Loan
16 January 2017	(Brazil) Luiz Adriano	Milan	(Russia) Spartak Moscow	Free
17 January 2017	Luca Forte	Pescara	Carpi	Loan
17 January 2017	(France) Loïck Landre	(France) Lens	Genoa	Undisclosed
17 January 2017	Mattia Aramu	Torino	Pro Vercelli	Loan
17 January 2017	Davide Riccardi	Verona	Südtirol	Loan
17 January 2017	Robert Gucher	Frosinone	Vicenza	Undisclosed
17 January 2017	Thomas Saloni	Spezia	Carrarese	Loan
18 January 2017	Alfred Gomis	Torino	Salernitana	Loan
18 January 2017	(Senegal) Abou Diop	Torino	Modena	Loan
18 January 2017	(Albania) Rey Manaj	Inter	Pisa	Loan
18 January 2017	(Croatia) Dario Župarić	Pescara	(Croatia) HNK Rijeka	Loan
18 January 2017	Giacomo Beretta	Milan	Carpi	Loan
18 January 2017	Francesco Ardizzone	Pro Vercelli	Virtus Entella	Undisclosed
18 January 2017	Luca Lezzerini	Fiorentina	Avellino	Loan
18 January 2017	(Spain) Héctor Otín Lafuente	Virtus Entella	Gubbio	Loan
18 January 2017	Pierluigi Frattali	Avellino	Parma	Undisclosed
18 January 2017	Luca Bittante	Empoli	Salernitana	Loan
18 January 2017	(Czech Republic) Roman Macek	Juventus	Bari	Loan
18 January 2017	Matteo Di Piazza	Vicenza	Foggia	Undisclosed
18 January 2017	Kevin Magri	Vicenza	Taranto	Loan
18 January 2017	(Morocco) Ismail H'Maidat	Vicenza	Roma	Loan return
19 January 2017	(France) Loïck Landre	Genoa	Pisa	Loan
19 January 2017	Paolo Faragò	Novara	Cagliari	Loan
19 January 2017	Mirco Spighi	S.P.A.L.	Teramo	Undisclosed
19 January 2017	Stefano Pettinari	Pescara	Ternana	Loan
19 January 2017	Sergio Floccari	Bologna	S.P.A.L.	Undisclosed
19 January 2017	Antonio Montella	Pisa	AlbinoLeffe	Undisclosed
19 January 2017	Simone Della Latta	Pontedera	Carpi	Undisclosed
19 January 2017	Simone Della Latta	Carpi	Pontedera	Loan
19 January 2017	(Mali) Cheick Keita	Virtus Entella	(England) Birmingham City	Undisclosed
19 January 2017	(Argentina) Bruno Zuculini	(England) Manchester City	Verona	Loan
19 January 2017	(Argentina) Julian Illanes	(Argentina) Córdoba	Fiorentina	Undisclosed
19 January 2017	Nicolò Fazzi	Perugia	Atalanta	Undisclosed
19 January 2017	Nicolò Fazzi	Atalanta	Perugia	18-month loan
19 January 2017	(Greece) Panagiotis Kone	Udinese	(Spain) Granada	Loan
19 January 2017	Eddi Gava	Ternana	Melfi	Undisclosed
19 January 2017	Valerio Nava	Atalanta	Alessandria	Loan
19 January 2017	Salvatore Molina	Avellino	Atalanta	Loan return
19 January 2017	Davide Bassi	Atalanta	Unattached	Released
19 January 2017	Luca Milesi	Atalanta	Modena	Loan
19 January 2017	Alex Redolfi	Atalanta	Cremonese	Loan
19 January 2017	Daniele Paponi	Latina	Juve Stabia	Undisclosed
20 January 2017	(Cyprus) Grigoris Kastanos	Juventus	Pescara	Loan
20 January 2017	(Bosnia and Herzegovina) Toni Šunjić	(Germany) Vfb Stuttgart	Palermo	Loan
20 January 2017	Antonio Floro Flores	Chievo	Bari	Loan
20 January 2017	Cristian Daniel Ledesma	Unattached	Ternana	Free
20 January 2017	Gaetano Monachello	Atalanta	Ternana	Loan
20 January 2017	(Guinea-Bissau) Zé Turbo	Inter	(Spain) Marbella	Loan
20 January 2017	(The Gambia) Lamin Jallow	Chievo	Trapani	Loan
20 January 2017	(Greece) Georgios Makris	Pisa	Unattached	Released
20 January 2017	Raffaele Maiello	Napoli	Frosinone	Loan
21 January 2017	(Cameroon) Joseph Minala	Lazio	Salernitana	Loan
23 January 2017	Diego Fabbrini	(England) Birmingham City	Spezia	Loan
23 January 2017	(Spain) Gerard Deulofeu	(England) Everton	Milan	Loan
23 January 2017	Giuseppe Figliomeni	Trapani	Foggia	Undisclosed
23 January 2017	Giuseppe Scalera	Bari	Fiorentina	Loan
23 January 2017	Gaetano Castrovilli	Bari	Fiorentina	Loan
23 January 2017	Paolo Branduani	S.P.A.L.	Teramo	Loan
24 January 2017	Aniello Salzano	Crotone	Bari	Undisclosed
24 January 2017	Alessandro Santopadre	Perugia	Atalanta	Undisclosed
24 January 2017	Alessandro Santopadre	Atalanta	Perugia	Loan
24 January 2017	Patrick Ciurria	Spezia	Siena	Loan
24 January 2017	Mattia Mustacchio	Pro Vercelli	Perugia	Undisclosed
24 January 2017	Andrea Catellani	Spezia	Virtus Entella	Undisclosed
24 January 2017	Nikita Contini	Napoli	Taranto	Loan
24 January 2017	Francesco Rossi	Teramo	Atalanta	Loan return
24 January 2017	Emanuele Suagher	Atalanta	Bari	Loan
24 January 2017	Giacomo Poluzzi	Fidelis Andria	S.P.A.L.	Undisclosed
24 January 2017	(Romania) Mihai Bălașa	Roma	(Romania) Steaua București	Undisclosed
25 January 2017	(The Gambia) Ali Sowe	ChievoVerona	Vibonese	Loan
25 January 2017	(Slovenia) Miha Zajc	(Slovenia) Olimpija Ljubljana	Empoli	Undisclosed
25 January 2017	(Argentina) Mauro Zárate	Fiorentina	(England) Watford	Undisclosed
25 January 2017	(Serbia) Nikola Pejović	(Serbia) Zemun	Empoli	Loan
25 January 2017	(Georgia (country)) Roman Chanturia	Empoli	(Portugal) Olhanense	Loan
25 January 2017	Francesco Valiani	Bari	Livorno	Undisclosed
25 January 2017	(Uruguay) Juan Surraco	Ternana	FeralpiSalò	Undisclosed
25 January 2017	Antonio Cassano	Sampdoria	Unattached	Released
25 January 2017	(Lithuania) Vykintas Slivka	Juventus	Ascoli	Loan
26 January 2017	(Sweden) Oscar Hiljemark	Palermo	Genoa	Loan
26 January 2017	Claudio Sparacello	Trapani	Pistoiese	Loan
26 January 2017	Francesco Fedato	Sampdoria	Carpi	Loan
26 January 2017	Lorenzo Filippini	Lazio	Virtus Entella	Loan
26 January 2017	Gaetano Masucci	Virtus Entella	Pisa	Undisclosed
26 January 2017	Rolando Bianchi	Perugia	Unattached	Released
26 January 2017	(Slovakia) Michal Tomič	(Slovakia) Senica	Sampdoria	Undisclosed
26 January 2017	(Belgium) Senna Miangue	Inter	Cagliari	Loan
26 January 2017	(Croatia) Damjan Đoković	(Germany) Greuther Fürth	Spezia	Undisclosed
27 January 2017	(France) M'Baye Niang	Milan	(England) Watford	Loan
27 January 2017	(France) Patrice Evra	Juventus	(France) Olympique de Marseille	Undisclosed
27 January 2017	(France) Anthony Mounier	Bologna	(France) Saint-Étienne	Loan
27 January 2017	Alex Ferrari	Bologna	Verona	Loan
27 January 2017	Janis Cavagna	Atalanta	Monopoli	Loan
27 January 2017	Tiziano Tulissi	Atalanta	Piacenza	Loan
27 January 2017	(Ghana) Boadu Maxwell Acosty	Latina	Crotone	Undisclosed
27 January 2017	Bryan Cristante	(Portugal) Benfica	Atalanta	Loan
27 January 2017	(Poland) Igor Łasicki	Napoli	Carpi	Loan
27 January 2017	Umberto Eusepi	Pisa	Avellino	Loan
27 January 2017	(Ivory Coast) Assane Gnoukouri	Inter	Udinese	Loan
27 January 2017	Alessandro Tonti	Latina	Mantova	Undisclosed
27 January 2017	Matteo Grandi	Cesena	Latina	Loan
27 January 2017	(Spain) Bambo Diaby	Sampdoria	Mantova	Loan
27 January 2017	(Brazil) Caio Rangel	Cagliari	(Brazil) Criciúma	Loan
28 January 2017	Riccardo Saponara	Empoli	Fiorentina	18-month loan
28 January 2017	(France) Clément Grenier	(France) Lyon	Roma	Loan
30 January 2017	Giuseppe Vives	Torino	Pro Vercelli	Undisclosed
30 January 2017	Filippo Mugelli	Scandicci	Carpi	Undisclosed
30 January 2017	Filippo Mugelli	Carpi	Scandicci	Loan
30 January 2017	(Slovenia) Enej Jelenič	Livorno	Carpi	Undisclosed
30 January 2017	(Nigeria) Jerry Mbakogu	(Russia) Krylia Sovetov	Carpi	Loan return
30 January 2017	Leonardo Blanchard	Carpi	Brescia	Loan
30 January 2017	Loris Zonta	Inter	Pisa	18-month loan
30 January 2017	(Ghana) Richmond Boakye	Latina	(Serbia) Red Star Belgrade	18-month loan
30 January 2017	Roberto Criscuolo	Latina	Sampdoria	Loan return
30 January 2017	Cristian Buonaiuto	Perugia	Latina	Loan
30 January 2017	(Slovenia) Saša Živec	(Poland) Piast Gliwice	Latina	Loan
30 January 2017	(Slovenia) Gregor Bajde	Novara	(Slovenia) Maribor	Loan return
30 January 2017	Jacopo Manconi	Novara	Trapani	Loan
30 January 2017	(Portugal) Pedro Pereira	Sampdoria	(Portugal) Benfica	Undisclosed
30 January 2017	(Serbia) Filip Đuričić	(Portugal) Benfica	Sampdoria	Undisclosed
30 January 2017	(Argentina) Lucas Ocampos	(France) Olympique de Marseille	Milan	Loan
30 January 2017	Filippo Perucchini	Bologna	Lecce	Loan
30 January 2017	(Brazil) Rodrigo Ely	Milan	(Spain) Alavés	Loan
30 January 2017	Riccardo Orsolini	Ascoli	Juventus	€6+4M
30 January 2017	Riccardo Orsolini	Juventus	Ascoli	Loan
31 January 2017	(Belgium) Gaby Mudingayi	Pisa	Unattached	Released
31 January 2017	Luigi Scaglia	Latina	Parma	Undisclosed
31 January 2017	(Ivory Coast) Jean Armel Drolé	Perugia	(Turkey) Antalyaspor	Loan
31 January 2017	(Brazil) Matheus Pereira	Empoli	Juventus	Loan
31 January 2017	Riccardo Brosco	Verona	Latina	Loan
31 January 2017	Alberto Picchi	S.P.A.L.	Empoli	Loan
31 January 2017	(Ivory Coast) Pierre Zebli	Perugia	(Belgium) Genk	Undisclosed
31 January 2017	Alessio Benedetti	Torino	Taranto	Loan
31 January 2017	Davide Costa	Inter	Vicenza	Loan
31 January 2017	(Ghana) Isaac Donkor	Inter	Cesena	Loan
31 January 2017	Lorenzo Tassi	Inter	FeralpiSalò	Loan
31 January 2017	Giulio Sanseverino	Pisa	Messina	Loan
31 January 2017	(France) Eddy Gnahoré	Napoli	Perugia	18-month loan
31 January 2017	Andrea Ranocchia	Inter	(England) Hull City	Loan
31 January 2017	Antonio Negro	Napoli	Latina	Loan
31 January 2017	Pietro De Giorgio	Crotone	Latina	Loan
31 January 2017	Fabio Gerli	Entella	Bassano	Loan
31 January 2017	Davide Munari	Bassano	Torino	Loan
31 January 2017	Elia Parolin	Bassano	S.P.A.L.	Loan
31 January 2017	Leonardo Piazza	Bassano	Novara	Loan
31 January 2017	(Austria) Arnel Jakupovic	(England) Middlesbrough	Empoli	Undisclosed
31 January 2017	(Morocco) Omar El Kaddouri	Napoli	Empoli	Undisclosed
31 January 2017	Simone Fautario	Pisa	Modena	Undisclosed
31 January 2017	(Australia) Trent Sainsbury	(Chile) Jiangsu Suning	Inter	Loan
31 January 2017	Alessandro Deiola	Spezia	Cagliari	Loan return
31 January 2017	Valerio Verre	Pescara	Sampdoria	Undisclosed
31 January 2017	Valerio Verre	Sampdoria	Pescara	Loan
31 January 2017	(Colombia) Juan Manuel Valencia	(Colombia) Cortuluá	Bologna	Loan
31 January 2017	(France) Anthony Mounier	Bologna	Atalanta	Loan
31 January 2017	Giuseppe De Luca	Atalanta	Vicenza	Loan
31 January 2017	Michele Canini	Atalanta	Cremonese	Loan
31 January 2017	Marco Carnesecchi	Atalanta	Cesena	Loan
31 January 2017	Stefano Cason	Atalanta	Trapani	Loan
31 January 2017	Alberto Dossena	Atalanta	Perugia	Loan
31 January 2017	(Colombia) Víctor Ibarbo	(Greece) Panathinaikos	Cagliari	Loan return
31 January 2017	(Ghana) Sulley Muntari	Unattached	Pescara	Free
31 January 2017	(Croatia) Lorenco Šimić	(Croatia) Hajduk Split	Sampdoria	Undisclosed
31 January 2017	Davide Arras	Cagliari	Olbia	Undisclosed
31 January 2017	(Ghana) Joseph Tetteh	Olbia	Cagliari	Undisclosed
31 January 2017	(Ghana) Joseph Tetteh	Cagliari	Olbia	Loan
31 January 2017	Lorenzo Musto	Bologna	Lumezzane	Loan
31 January 2017	(Netherlands) Hans Hateboer	(Netherlands) Groningen	Atalanta	Undisclosed
31 January 2017	Niccolò Giannetti	Cagliari	Spezia	Loan
31 January 2017	Manolo Gabbiadini	Napoli	(England) Southampton	Undisclosed
31 January 2017	Christian D'Urso	Roma	Carpi	Loan
31 January 2017	(Senegal) Moustapha Seck	Roma	Carpi	Loan
31 January 2017	Raffaele Palladino	Crotone	Genoa	Undisclosed
31 January 2017	(Togo) Serge Gakpé	Genoa	Chievo	Loan
31 January 2017	Antonio Cinelli	Chievo	Novara	Loan
31 January 2017	(The Gambia) Yusupha Bobb	Chievo	Padova	Loan
31 January 2017	(Senegal) Issa Cissokho	Genoa	(France) Angers	Free
31 January 2017	(Slovenia) Andrej Kotnik	(Slovenia) ND Gorica	Crotone	Loan
31 January 2017	Luca Iotti	Ascoli	Olbia	Loan
31 January 2017	Filippo Romagna	Juventus	Brescia	Loan
31 January 2017	Edoardo Lancini	Brescia	Novara	Loan
31 January 2017	Nicola Lancini	Bassano	Brescia	Loan return
31 January 2017	Simone Pecorini	Ascoli	Virtus Entella	Undisclosed
31 January 2017	(Sweden) Robin Quaison	Palermo	(Germany) 1. FSV Mainz 05	Undisclosed
31 January 2017	Accursio Bentivegna	Palermo	Ascoli	Loan
31 January 2017	(Brazil) Vinícius Freitas	Lazio	(Greece) AEK Athens	Undisclosed
31 January 2017	Luca Crecco	Avellino	Lazio	Loan return
31 January 2017	(Germany) Moritz Leitner	Lazio	(Germany) FC Augsburg	Undisclosed
31 January 2017	Cristian Galano	Vicenza	Bari	Loan
31 January 2017	(Netherlands) Ricardo Kishna	Lazio	(France) Lille	Loan
31 January 2017	(England) Ravel Morrison	Lazio	(England) QPR	Loan
31 January 2017	Robert Acquafresca	Bologna	Ternana	Undisclosed
1 February 2017	(Colombia) Carlos Carbonero	Sampdoria	(Uruguay) Fénix	Loan return
2 February 2017	(Venezuela) Josef Martínez	Torino	(United States) Atlanta United	Loan
9 February 2017	(Uruguay) Álvaro González	Lazio	(Uruguay) Club Nacional	Free
6 February 2017	(Chile) Carlos Carmona	Atalanta	(United States) Atlanta United	Free
7 February 2017	(Serbia) Milan Milanović	Unattached	Pisa	Free
9 February 2017	(Brazil) Hernanes	Juventus	(China) Hebei Fortune	€8+2M
14 February 2017	(Croatia) Marko Jordan	(Czech Republic) Zlín	Latina	Free
17 February 2017	(Mali) Mohamed Sissoko	Unattached	Ternana	Free
