= Santopadre (surname) =

Santopadre is a surname. Notable people with the surname include:

- Alessandro Santopadre (born 1998), Italian football player
- Frank Santopadre (born 1966), American comedy writer and producer
- Vincenzo Santopadre (born 1971), Italian tennis player and coach
