= Lasagna (disambiguation) =

- Lasagna or Lasagne, wide and flat pasta
- Lasagna, a song on the album Even Worse by "Weird Al" Yankovic
- Baby Lasagna, a Croatian musician
- Fabrizio Lasagna, an Italian footballer
- Kevin Lasagna, an Italian footballer
- Louis Lasagna, an American physician and professor of medicine
- Bitch Lasagna, also known as "T-Series Diss Track", a song by PewDiePie
