= 2022–23 FC Südtirol season =

F.C. Südtirol
2022–23 season
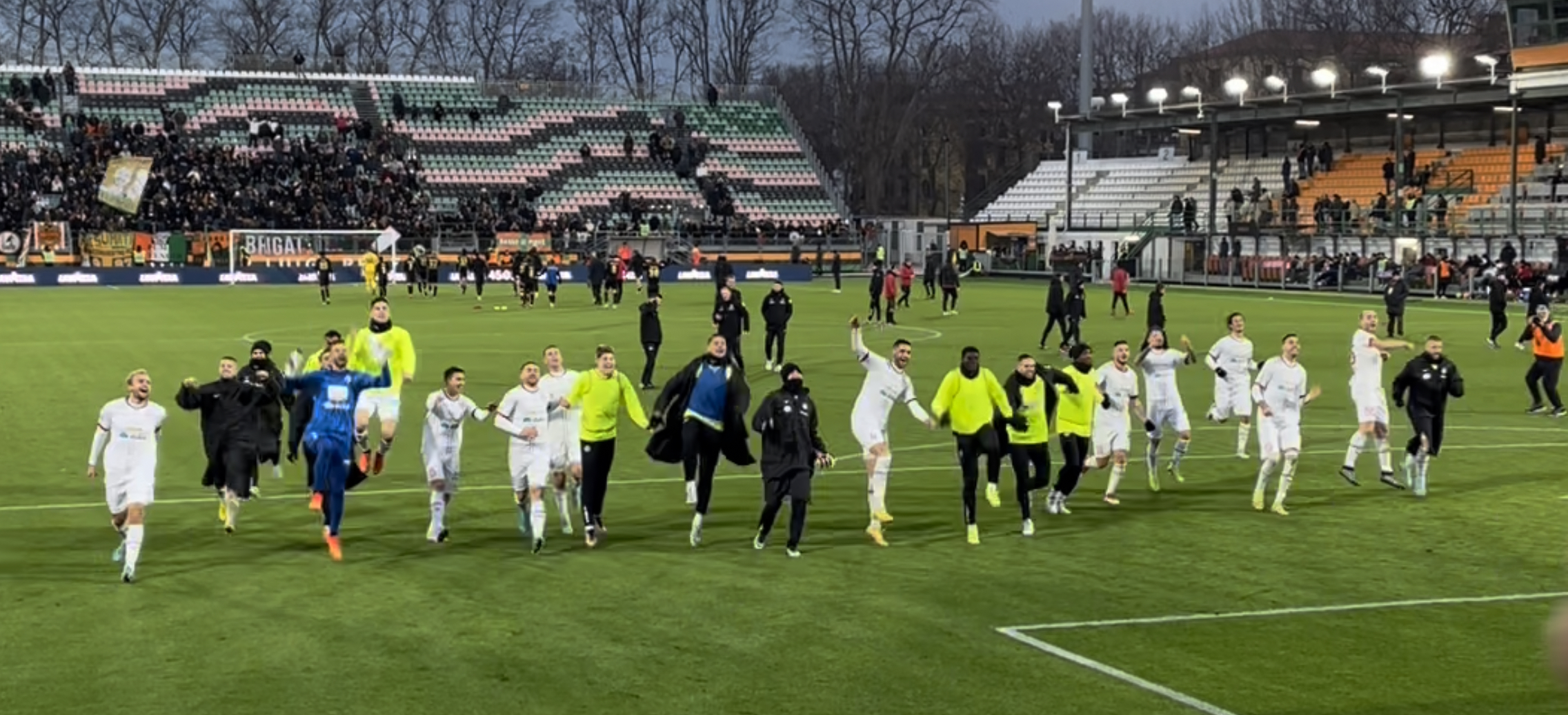
- Chairman: Gerhard Comper
- Head coach: Lamberto Zauli
- Stadium: Stadio Druso
- Serie B: 6th
- Coppa Italia: Preliminary round
Home colours	Away colours

The 2022–23 season was the 49th in the history of the Italian association football club F.C. Südtirol and their first ever season in the second division. The club participated in Serie B and Coppa Italia.

== Players ==
As of 2 February 2023

Note: Flags indicate national team as defined under FIFA eligibility rules; some limited exceptions apply. Players may hold more than one non-FIFA nationality.

No.	Pos.	Nation	Player
1	GK	ITA	Giacomo Poluzzi
2	DF	ITA	Filippo Berra
3	DF	ITA	Alessandro Celli (on loan from Ternana)
4	DF	ITA	Marco Curto
5	DF	FRA	Kevin Vinetot
6	MF	ITA	Luca Fiordilino (on loan from Venezia)
7	MF	ITA	Nicholas Siega
8	MF	ITA	Gabriel Lunetta (on loan from Rijeka)
9	FW	ITA	Simone Mazzocchi (on loan from Atalanta)
10	MF	ITA	Mirko Carretta
12	GK	ITA	Simon Harrasser
14	FW	GUI	Moustapha Cissé (on loan from Atalanta)
16	MF	ITA	Luca Belardinelli (on loan from Empoli)
17	MF	ITA	Daniele Casiraghi
18	FW	ITA	Matteo Rover

No.	Pos.	Nation	Player
19	DF	ITA	Giovanni Zaro
20	MF	GHA	Shaka Mawuli
21	MF	ITA	Fabian Tait
23	MF	ITA	Marco Pompetti (on loan from Inter Milan)
24	DF	ITA	Simone Davì
25	GK	ITA	Stefano Minelli (on loan from Cesena)
26	DF	ITA	Filippo De Col
28	MF	ITA	Raphael Kofler
32	FW	ARG	Joaquin Larrivey
45	DF	ITA	Andrea Giorgini
55	DF	ITA	Andrea Masiello
88	MF	ITA	Andrea Schiavone
90	FW	ITA	Raphael Odogwu
—	MF	ITA	Marco Moscati

=== Out on loan ===
Note: Flags indicate national team as defined under FIFA eligibility rules; some limited exceptions apply. Players may hold more than one non-FIFA nationality.

No.	Pos.	Nation	Player
—	DF	ITA	Alberto Barison (at Trento until 30 June 2023)
—	DF	ITA	Tommaso D'Orazio (at Cosenza until 30 June 2023, obligation to buy)
—	DF	ITA	Niccolò Gabrieli (at Olbia until 30 June 2023)

No.	Pos.	Nation	Player
—	DF	ITA	Jonas Heinz (at Torres until 30 June 2023)
—	MF	ITA	Davide Voltan (at Feralpisalò until 30 June 2023)
—	FW	ITA	Francesco Galuppini (at Novara until 30 June 2023)

== Pre-season and friendlies ==
Win Draw Loss Fixtures

21 July 2022 Friendly	Sassuolo (Italy)	2–0	(Italy) Südtirol	Sterzing
18:00 CEST (UTC+2)	Matheus Henrique 25'; Álvarez 83' (pen.)	Report		Stadium: Centro Sportivo di Vipiteno; Referee: Daniele Perenzoni

6 August 2022 Friendly	Südtirol (Italy)	2–2	(Italy) Mantova	Appiano
16:30 CEST (UTC+2)				Stadium: Campo Maso Ronco

== Competitions ==
=== Overall record ===
Competition	First match	Last match	Starting round	Final position	Record							
Competition	First match	Last match	Starting round	Final position	Pld	W	D	L	GF	GA	GD	Win %
Serie B	14 August 2022	19 May 2023	Matchday 1	6th	38	14	16	8	38	34	+4	36.84
Coppa Italia	30 July 2022		Preliminary round	Preliminary round	1	0	0	1	1	3	−2	0.00
Total					39	14	16	9	39	37	+2	35.90

Source: Soccerway

=== Serie B ===
==== League table ====
Pos	Team	Pld	W	D	L	GF	GA	GD	Pts	Promotion, qualification or relegation
4	Parma (Note: Parma were deducted one point for missing the deadline to fulfil obligations for February taxes on the salary bill.)	38	17	10	11	48	39	+9	60 (Note: Parma finished ahead of Cagliari on head-to-head points: Cagliari 1–1 Parma, Parma 2–1 Cagliari.)	Qualification for promotion play-offs semi-finals
5	Cagliari (O, P)	38	15	15	8	50	34	+16	60	Qualification for promotion play-offs preliminary round
6	Südtirol	38	14	16	8	38	34	+4	58	Qualification for promotion play-offs preliminary round
7	Reggina (Note: Reggina were deducted five points for failing to pay taxes and player salaries on time. The deduction was initially seven points; later relegated to Serie D after enduring serious financial difficulties for several years. Brescia was readmitted into Serie B.) (E)	38	17	4	17	49	45	+4	50	Revival in Serie D
8	Venezia	38	13	10	15	51	50	+1	49	Qualification for promotion play-offs preliminary round

Source: Soccerway (in English)
Rules for classification: 1) Points; 2) Head-to-head points; 3) Head-to-head goal difference; 4) Goal difference; 5) Goals scored; 6) Draw.
(E) Eliminated; (O) Play-off winners; (P) Promoted

==== Results summary ====
Overall								Home						Away					
Pld	W	D	L	GF	GA	GD	Pts	W	D	L	GF	GA	GD	W	D	L	GF	GA	GD
38	14	16	8	38	34	+4	58	6	10	3	21	18	+3	8	6	5	17	16	+1

Source: Serie B

==== Results by round ====
Round	1	2	3	4	5	6	7	8	9	10	11	12	13	14	15	16	17	18	19	20	21	22	23	24	25	26	27	28	29	30	31	32	33	34	35
Ground	A	H	A	H	A	H	A	H	A	H	A	H	A	H	H	A	H	A	H	H	A	H	A	H	A	H	A	H	A	H	A	H	A	A	H
Result	L	L	L	W	W	D	W	D	W	W	D	D	D	D	D	L	D	W	L	W	W	W	W	D	D	D	W	W	D	W	D	L	L	D	D
Position																																			

Source: Serie B
A = Away; H = Home; W = Win; D = Draw; L = Loss

==== Matches ====
The league fixtures were announced on 15 July 2022.

14 August 2022 1	Brescia	2–0	Südtirol	Brescia
20:45 CEST (UTC+2)				Stadium: Stadio Mario Rigamonti

21 August 2022 2	Südtirol	1–2	Venezia	Bolzano

28 August 2022 3	Reggina	4–0	Südtirol	Reggio Calabria

4 September 2022 4	Südtirol	2–1	Pisa	Bolzano

10 September 2022 5	Como	0–2	Südtirol	Como

17 September 2022 6	Südtirol	1–1	Cosenza	Bolzano

1 October 2022 7	Palermo	0–1	Südtirol	Palermo

9 October 2022 8	Südtirol	1–1	Benevento	Bolzano

16 October 2022 9	Perugia	1–2	Südtirol	Perugia

22 October 2022 10	Südtirol	1–0	Parma	Bolzano

29 October 2022 11	SPAL	1–1	Südtirol	Ferrara

5 November 2022 12	Südtirol	2–2	Cagliari	Bolzano

12 November 2022 13	Bari	2–2	Südtirol	Bari

27 November 2022 14	Südtirol	2–2	Ascoli	Bolzano

4 December 2022 15	Südtirol	1–1	Frosinone	Bolzano

8 December 2022 16	Genoa	2–0	Südtirol	Genoa

11 December 2022 17	Südtirol	0–0	Ternana	Bolzano

18 December 2022 18	Cittadella	0–2	Südtirol	Cittadella

26 December 2022 19	Südtirol	0–2	Modena	Bolzano

15 January 2023 20	Südtirol	1–0	Brescia	Bolzano

21 January 2023 21	Venezia	0–1	Südtirol	Venice

28 January 2023 22	Südtirol	2–1	Reggina	Bolzano

4 February 2023 23	Pisa	0–1	Südtirol	Pisa

11 February 2023 24	Südtirol	1–1	Como	Bolzano

18 February 2023 25	Cosenza	0–0	Südtirol	Cosenza

25 February 2023 26	Südtirol	1–1	Palermo	Bolzano

1 March 2023 27	Benevento	0–2	Südtirol	Benevento

5 March 2023 28	Südtirol	2–1	Perugia	Bolzano

=== Coppa Italia ===
30 July 2022 Preliminary round	Südtirol	1–3	Feralpisalò	Bolzano
18:00 CEST (UTC+2)	Zaro (yellow card) 40'; Rover (yellow card) 44'; Voltan 56'	Report	Siligardi 34', 49'; Cernigoi 52'; Pilati (yellow card) 84'	Stadium: Stadio Druso; Referee: Luca Zufferli
