= Gianluca Mancini =

Italian footballer (born 1996)

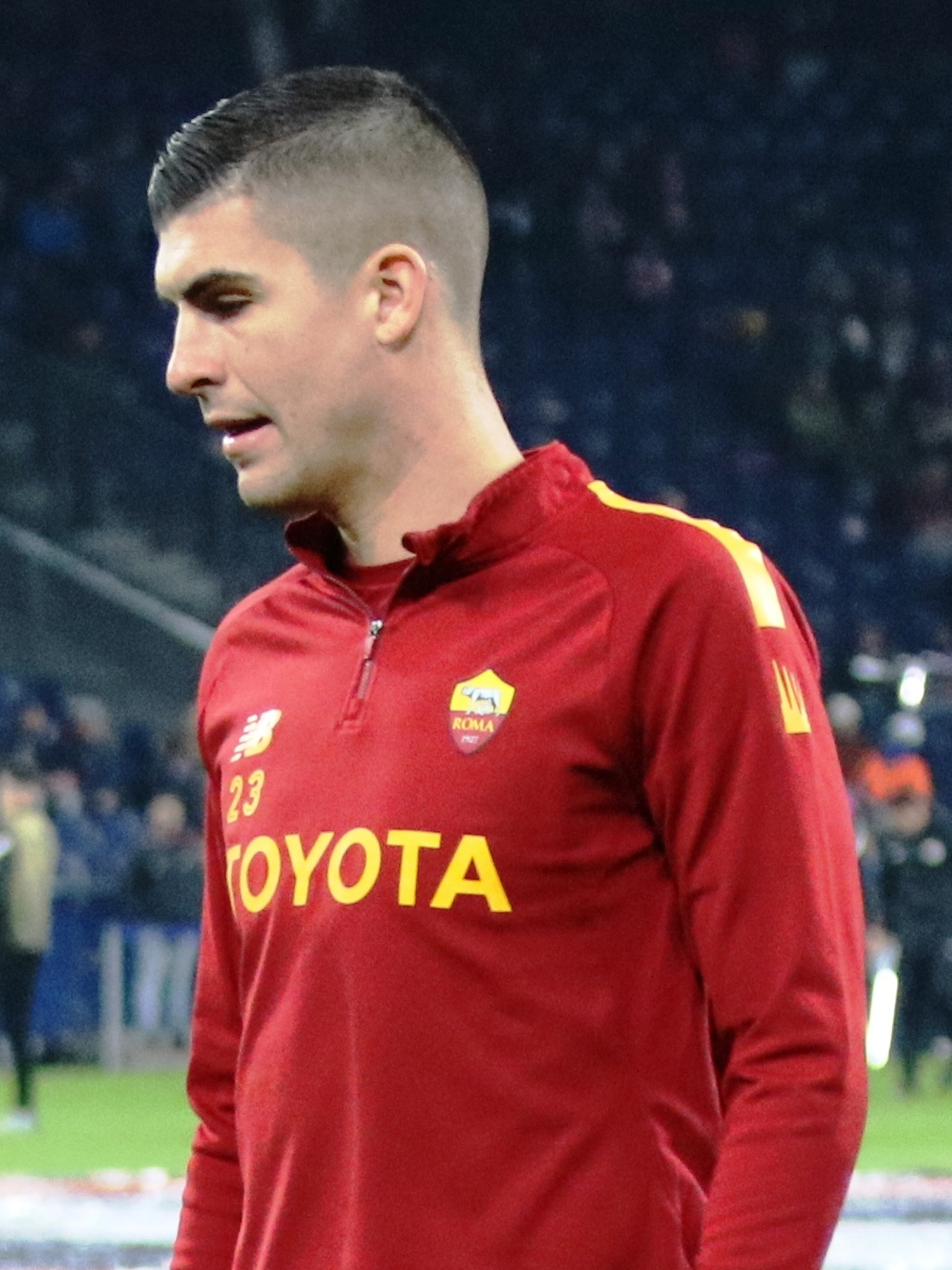
- Mancini with Roma in 2023

Personal information
- Date of birth: 17 April 1996 (age 30)
- Place of birth: Pontedera, Italy
- Height: 1.90 m (6 ft 3 in)
- Position: Centre-back

Team information
- Current team: Roma
- Number: 23

Youth career
- 2006–2015: Fiorentina

Senior career*
Years	Team	Apps	(Gls)
2015–2017	Perugia	25	(1)
2017–2020	Atalanta	41	(6)
2019–2020	→ Roma (loan)	32	(1)
2020–	Roma	213	(15)

International career^{‡}
2017–2019	Italy U21	13	(0)
2019–	Italy	22	(2)
- * Club domestic league appearances and goals as of 23:02, 5 September 2026 (UTC) ‡ National team caps and goals as of 6 October 2026

Gianluca Mancini (Italian pronunciation: [dʒanˈluːka manˈtʃiːni]; born 17 April 1996) is an Italian professional footballer who plays as a centre-back for Serie A club Roma and the Italy national team.

== Club career ==
=== Perugia ===
Mancini left for Perugia on loan in mid–2015, with an option to purchase. Mancini made his professional debut in the Serie B for Perugia on 11 September 2015 in a game against Pescara.

After a brief return to Florence, by the club excising the counter-option. on 1 August 2016, Fiorentina announced that they had sold Mancini to Perugia outright for free. It was later revealed that Fiorentina was eligible to 50% future transfer fee.

=== Atalanta ===
In January 2017, Mancini and Alessandro Santopadre, son of Massimiliano Santopadre, chairman of Perugia, were signed by Atalanta for €200,000 and €1 million transfer fees respectively. They were immediately loaned back to Perugia from Atalanta. The deal was later accused by the prosecutor as a manipulation of transfer fees, which overstated the price-tag of Santopadre and understated Mancini. The chairman and both clubs were acquitted of any wrongdoing in July 2018.

Mancini made his Serie A debut in a 1–1 draw against his former team Fiorentina, replacing Rafael Toloi after 25 minutes.

On 4 February 2018, he scored his first goal in a 1–0 for Atalanta against Chievo in Serie A.

=== Roma ===
On 17 July 2019, Mancini joined Roma on loan with a conditional obligation to buy for €13 million plus bonuses and a 10% sell on fee.

Mancini scored an own goal in the 2023 Europa League final against Sevilla, which Sevilla ultimately won on penalties. This made him the first player to score in a European final against a team managed by José Mourinho since Henrik Larsson in the 2003 UEFA Cup final.

== International career ==
On 1 September 2017, Mancini made his international debut with the Italy U21 team in a 3–0 friendly loss against Spain.

On 15 March 2019, Gianluca Mancini received a call-up from Roberto Mancini for Italy's UEFA Euro 2020 qualifying matches against Finland and Liechtenstein. On 26 March, he made his senior international debut in a 6–0 home win over Liechtenstein.

He took part in the 2019 UEFA European Under-21 Championship.

== Style of play ==
Mancini is a tall and physically strong central defender capable of playing in both a three or a four-man defensive line. Among his strengths are his excellent heading ability, which makes him a likely goal threat in the opposition's penalty box. Besides his regular position, he can also play as a right–sided full-back and a defensive-midfielder, mainly out of necessity. He has cited Marco Materazzi as his favourite defender of all time.

== Personal life ==
In December 2019, Gianluca married his long-term partner, Elisa; together they have two daughters.

Despite sharing a surname, he is not related to Italian football manager Roberto Mancini.

== Career statistics ==
=== Club ===
As of match played 10 September 2026

Appearances and goals by club, season and competition
Club	Season	League			Coppa Italia		Europe		Other		Total	
Club	Season	Division	Apps	Goals	Apps	Goals	Apps	Goals	Apps	Goals	Apps	Goals
Perugia	2015–16	Serie B	12	0	2	0	—		—		14	0
Perugia	2016–17	Serie B	13	1	1	0	—		2 (Note: Appearances in Serie B promotion play-offs)	0	16	1
Perugia	Total		25	1	3	0	—		2	0	30	1
Atalanta	2017–18	Serie A	11	1	2	0	0	0	—		13	1
Atalanta	2018–19	Serie A	30	5	2	0	3 (Note: Appearances in UEFA Europa League)	1	—		35	6
Atalanta	Total		41	6	4	0	3	1	—		48	7
Roma (loan)	2019–20	Serie A	32	1	2	0	7	0	—		41	1
Roma	2020–21	Serie A	33	4	1	0	7	1	—		41	5
Roma	2021–22	Serie A	33	0	1	0	12 (Note: Appearances in UEFA Europa Conference League)	1	—		46	1
Roma	2022–23	Serie A	35	1	2	0	14	0	—		51	1
Roma	2023–24	Serie A	36	4	1	0	12	3	—		49	7
Roma	2024–25	Serie A	37	2	0	0	9	1	—		46	3
Roma	2025–26	Serie A	36	4	0	0	9	1	—		45	5
Roma	2026–27	Serie A	3	0	0	0	1 (Note: Appearance in UEFA Champions League)	0	—		4	0
Roma	Roma total		245	16	7	0	71	7	—		323	23
Career total			311	23	14	0	74	8	2	0	401	31

=== International ===
As of match played 5 October 2026

Appearances and goals by national team and year
National team	Year	Apps	Goals
Italy	2019	3	0
Italy	2020	1	0
Italy	2021	2	0
Italy	2022	3	0
Italy	2023	2	0
Italy	2024	3	0
Italy	2025	4	2
Italy	2026	4	0
Total		22	2

Italy score listed first, score column indicates score after each Mancini goal.

List of international goals scored by Gianluca Mancini
No.	Date	Venue	Cap	Opponent	Score	Result	Competition
1	14 October 2025	Stadio Friuli, Udine, Italy	16	Israel	3–0	3–0	2026 FIFA World Cup qualification
2	13 November 2025	Zimbru Stadium, Chișinău, Moldova	17	Moldova	1–0	2–0	2026 FIFA World Cup qualification

== Honours ==
Roma

- UEFA Europa Conference League: 2021–22
- UEFA Europa League runner-up: 2022–23

Individual

- UEFA Europa League Team of the Season: 2020–21, 2023–24
