= Filippo Mugelli =

Italian footballer (born 1997)

Personal information
- Date of birth: 23 June 1997 (age 29)
- Place of birth: Bagno a Ripoli, Italy
- Height: 1.77 m (5 ft 9 1/2 in)
- Position: Midfielder

Team information
- Current team: Seravezza Pozzi
- Number: 11

Senior career*
| Years | Team | Apps | (Gls) |
| 2014–2017 | Scandicci | 11 | (0) |
| 2017–2019 | Carpi | 0 | (0) |
| 2017 | → Gavorrano (loan) | 3 | (0) |
| 2018 | → Lucchese (loan) | 1 | (0) |
| 2018–2019 | → Sangiovannese (loan) | 33 | (2) |
| 2019–2021 | Scandicci | 51 | (17) |
| 2021–2022 | Follonica Gavorrano | 40 | (5) |
| 2022–2023 | Pianese | 19 | (0) |
| 2023– | Seravezza Pozzi | 16 | (1) |
- * Club domestic league appearances and goals as of 20 December 2023

Filippo Mugelli (born 23 June 1997) is an Italian football player who plays for Serie D club Seravezza Pozzi.

== Club career ==
He made his Serie C debut for Gavorrano on 3 September 2017 in a game against Olbia.

On 15 July 2019, he returned to Scandicci.
