= Ludovico Gargiulo =

Italian footballer

Personal information
- Date of birth: 23 March 1995 (age 31)
- Place of birth: Sarno, Italy
- Height: 1.74 m (5 ft 8 1/2 in)
- Position: Midfielder

Team information
- Current team: Prato
- Number: 7

Youth career
- –2014: Empoli

Senior career*
Years	Team	Apps	(Gls)
2014–2018	Empoli	0	(0)
2014–2015	→ Tuttocuoio (loan)	35	(1)
2015–2016	→ Cremonese (loan)	2	(0)
2016–2017	→ Pistoiese (loan)	18	(1)
2017–2018	→ Prato (loan)	40	(1)
2018	Scandicci	8	(0)
2018–2020	Prato	44	(1)
2020–2021	Caronnese	31	(0)
2021–2022	Livorno		
2022–2023	Tuttocuoio		
2023	Certaldo	15	(0)
2023–	Prato	2	(0)
- * Club domestic league appearances and goals as of 20 December 2023

Ludovico Gargiulo (born 23 March 1995) is an Italian football player who plays for Serie D club Prato.

== Club career ==
He made his Serie C debut for Tuttocuoio on 30 August 2014 in a game against Carrarese.
