= Moustapha Cissé =

Guinean footballer (born 2003)

Personal information
- Full name: Moustapha Elhadji Cissé
- Date of birth: 14 September 2003 (age 23)
- Place of birth: Conakry, Guinea
- Height: 1.82 m (6 ft 0 in)
- Position: Forward

Team information
- Current team: Carrarese (on loan from Atalanta)
- Number: 11

Youth career
- 2019–2021: Rinascita Refugees

Senior career*
Years	Team	Apps	(Gls)
2021–2022	Rinascita Refugees	8	(18)
2022–	Atalanta	3	(1)
2022	→ Pisa (loan)	7	(0)
2023	→ Südtirol (loan)	12	(2)
2023–	→ Atalanta U23 (res.)	48	(10)
2024–2025	→ St. Gallen (loan)	21	(2)
2026–	→ Carrarese (loan)	1	(0)
- * Club domestic league appearances and goals as of 22 August 2026

Moustapha Elhadji Cissé (born 14 September 2003) is a Guinean professional footballer who plays as a forward for Serie B club Carrarese, on loan from Atalanta.

== Club career ==
=== Rinascita Refugees ===
Cissé moved to Italy as a refugee and orphan and was scouted playing for Seconda Categoria club Rinascita Refugees in 2019, a team made of refugees and asylum seekers in Lecce in the eighth tier of Italian football. Whilst at Rinascita Refugees, Cissé scored 18 goals in eight league games for the club.

=== Atalanta ===
On 23 February 2022, Cissé signed for Atalanta. He debuted with their reserves in March 2022, scoring three goals in three games. Cissé made his Serie A debut with Atalanta in a 1–0 win over Bologna; coming on as a substitute in the 65th minute, he scored his side's only goal in the 82nd minute.

==== Loans in Serie B ====
On 5 August 2022, Cissé joined Serie B side Pisa on loan with an option to buy. He subsequently made his debut for the club the following day, starting in a 4–1 Coppa Italia defeat to Brescia.

Having found limited playing time in Tuscany, on 30 January 2023 Cissé was recalled from Pisa by Atalanta, subsequently joining fellow second-tier club Südtirol on loan until the end of the season.

== Career statistics ==
=== Club ===
As of match played 14 December 2023

Appearances and goals by club, season and competition
Club	Season	League			Cup		Europe		Other		Total	
Club	Season	Division	Apps	Goals	Apps	Goals	Apps	Goals	Apps	Goals	Apps	Goals
Atalanta	2021–22	Serie A	3	1	0	0	—		—		3	1
Atalanta	2023–24	Serie A	0	0	0	0	1 (Note: Appearance in UEFA Europa League)	0	—		1	0
Atalanta	Total		3	1	0	0	1	0	—		4	1
Pisa (loan)	2022–23	Serie B	7	0	1	0	—		—		8	0
Südtirol (loan)	2022–23	Serie B	11	2	0	0	—		1 (Note: Appearance in Serie B promotion play-offs)	0	12	2
Career total			21	3	1	0	1	0	1	0	24	3
