= Nathan Kabasele =

Belgian footballer

Personal information
- Full name: Nathan Clement Kabasele Mwamba
- Date of birth: 14 January 1994 (age 32)
- Place of birth: Brussels, Belgium
- Height: 1.78 m (5 ft 10 in)
- Position: Striker

Youth career
- –2010: Anderlecht

Senior career*
Years	Team	Apps	(Gls)
2010–2017	Anderlecht	19	(2)
2012	→ Westerlo (loan)	4	(0)
2013	→ Torino (loan)	0	(0)
2013–2014	→ De Graafschap (loan)	29	(6)
2015–2016	→ De Graafschap (loan)	21	(3)
2017	→ Royal Excel Mouscron (loan)	15	(0)
2017–2018	Gazişehir Gaziantep	12	(2)
2018	→ Union SG (loan)	10	(1)
2018	Voluntari	8	(1)
2020	Al-Diwaniya	6	(1)
2021	AS Vita Club	?	(?)
2022	KVK Westhoek	?	(?)

International career
2009	Belgium U16	6	(1)
2011	Belgium U17	2	(0)
2012–2013	Belgium U19	9	(4)
2013–2015	Belgium U21	8	(4)
- * Club domestic league appearances and goals as of 10 January 2018

Nathan Clement Kabasele Mwamba, commonly known as Nathan Kabasele, (born 14 January 1994) is a Belgian professional footballer who is currently free agent and plays as a striker.

== International career ==
Kabasele was born in Belgium and is of Congolese descent. He is a youth international footballer for Belgium.
