= Lorenzo Rosseti =

Italian footballer (born 1994)

Personal information
- Full name: Valerio Lorenzo Rosseti
- Date of birth: 5 August 1994 (age 32)
- Place of birth: Arezzo, Italy
- Height: 1.82 m (6 ft 0 in)
- Position: Striker

Team information
- Current team: Reggina
- Number: 27

Youth career
- Siena

Senior career*
Years	Team	Apps	(Gls)
2013–2014	Siena	27	(6)
2014–2017	Juventus	0	(0)
2014–2015	→ Atalanta (loan)	1	(0)
2015–2016	→ Cesena (loan)	24	(4)
2016–2017	→ Lugano (loan)	11	(4)
2017–2020	Ascoli	49	(7)
2020–2021	Como	16	(1)
2021–2023	Latina	40	(3)
2023–	Reggina	15	(2)

International career^{‡}
2011	Italy U18	4	(0)
2011–2013	Italy U19	8	(0)
2013–2015	Italy U20	8	(2)
2015–2016	Italy U21	8	(1)
- * Club domestic league appearances and goals as of 8 October 2023 ‡ National team caps and goals as of 11 October 2016

Valerio Lorenzo Rosseti (born 5 August 1994), known as Lorenzo Rosseti, is an Italian professional footballer who plays as a striker for Serie D Group I club Reggina.

== Club career ==
Rosseti was signed by defending Serie A champions Juventus in August 2014 as a free agent; he was released by Siena in July after the club was not admit 2014–15 professional league. On 29 August 2014 Rosseti joined fellow Serie A club Atalanta.

On 21 July 2015 Rosseti was signed by Serie B club A.C. Cesena in a temporary deal. On 6 August 2016 he was signed by FC Lugano in a temporary deal after a month with Juventus's pre-season camp, having scored a goal against South China AA in a friendly.

On 5 October 2020 he signed with Como.

On 20 August 2021, he joined Latina.

== Honours ==
Como

- Serie C: 2020–21 (Group A)
