= Simone Andrea Ganz =

Italian footballer (born 1993)

Simone Ganz
Personal information
- Full name: Simone Andrea Ganz
- Date of birth: 21 September 1993 (age 33)
- Place of birth: Genoa, Italy
- Height: 1.75 m (5 ft 9 in)
- Position: Forward

Team information
- Current team: Piacenza (on loan from Pro Patria)

Youth career
- Masseroni Marchese
- 2008–2013: AC Milan

Senior career*
Years	Team	Apps	(Gls)
2011–2014	AC Milan	0	(0)
2013–2014	→ Lumezzane (loan)	12	(0)
2014	→ Barletta (loan)	6	(0)
2014–2016	Como	70	(27)
2016–2017	Juventus	0	(0)
2016–2017	→ Hellas Verona (loan)	21	(4)
2017	Pescara	5	(0)
2017–2022	Ascoli	23	(2)
2019–2020	→ Como (loan)	24	(8)
2020–2021	→ Mantova (loan)	30	(10)
2021–2022	→ Lecco (loan)	32	(14)
2022–2023	Triestina	22	(4)
2023	→ Latina (loan)	13	(5)
2023–2024	Brindisi	13	(2)
2024	Pontedera	14	(1)
2024–2025	Novara	21	(2)
2025–	Pro Patria	12	(0)
2026–	→ Piacenza (loan)	0	(0)

International career
2011	Italy U-19	5	(1)
- * Club domestic league appearances and goals as of 1 February 2025

Simone Andrea Ganz (born 21 September 1993) is an Italian professional footballer who plays as a striker for Serie D club Piacenza, on loan from Pro Patria.

== Club career ==
=== AC Milan ===
Ganz started playing football as a child at the Masseroni Marchese football academy in Milan, before joining A.C. Milan's youth system at the start of the 2008–09 season. He made his professional debut with the first team on 1 November 2011, coming on as a substitute for Robinho in a UEFA Champions League group stage match against BATE Borisov, which ended in a 1–1 draw.

For the 2013–14 season, he was loaned out to Prima Divisione club Lumezzane. However, the deal was cut short during the January transfer window and he subsequently joined Barletta on another loan for the remainder of the season.

=== Como ===
At the start of the 2014–15 season, Ganz joined Lega Pro club Como.

=== Juventus ===
After scoring 16 goals in Serie B for Como, Juventus signed Ganz on a four-year deal in May 2016. He was immediately sent out on a season-long loan to Hellas Verona.

=== Ascoli ===
On 28 September 2020, he joined Mantova on loan.

On 31 August 2021, he was loaned to Lecco on Serie C.

=== Triestina ===
On 26 July 2022, Ganz signed a two-year contract with Triestina. On 31 January 2023, Ganz was loaned by Latina, with an option to buy.

=== Novara ===
On 14 August 2024, Ganz signed a two-season contract with Novara.

== International career ==
Ganz won 5 caps and scored one goal with the Italy under-19 side in 2011.

== Personal life ==
Ganz is the son of former footballer Maurizio Ganz. He is of Austrian origin through his father.

== Career statistics ==
=== Club ===
Updated 24 March 2021

Club	League	Season	League		Cup		Europe		Other		Total	
Club	League	Season	Apps	Goals	Apps	Goals	Apps	Goals	Apps	Goals	Apps	Goals
AC Milan	Serie A	2011–12	0	0	0	0	1	0	0	0	1	0
AC Milan	Serie A	2012–13	0	0	0	0	0	0	–		0	0
AC Milan	Total		0	0	0	0	1	0	0	0	1	0
Lumezzane (loan)	Serie C	2013–14	12	0	1	0	–		–		13	0
Barletta (loan)	Serie C	2013–14	6	0	0	0	–		–		6	0
Como	Lega Pro	2014–15	35	11	2	0	–		5	4	42	15
Como	Serie B	2015–16	35	16	0	0	–		–		35	16
Como	Total		70	27	2	0	–		5	4	77	31
Hellas Verona (loan)	Serie B	2016–17	21	4	3	1	–		–		24	5
Pescara	Serie B	2017–18	5	0	3	1	–		–		8	1
Ascoli	Serie B	2017–18	12	0	0	0	–		–		12	0
Ascoli	Serie B	2018–19	11	2	1	0	–		–		12	2
Ascoli	Total		23	2	1	0	–		–		24	2
Como (loan)	Serie C	2019–20	24	8	2	0	–		–		26	8
Mantova (loan)	Serie C	2020–21	23	10	0	0	–		–		23	10
Lecco (loan)	Serie C	2021–22	0	0	0	0	–		–		0	0
Career total			184	51	12	2	1	0	5	4	202	57
