= Gianluca Pollace =

Italian footballer

Personal information
- Date of birth: 25 December 1995 (age 30)
- Place of birth: Rome, Italy
- Height: 1.82 m (6 ft 0 in)
- Position: Defender

Youth career
- Urbe Tevere
- –2015: Lazio

Senior career*
Years	Team	Apps	(Gls)
2014–2017	Lazio	0	(0)
2015–2016	→ Salernitana (loan)	1	(0)
2016–2017	→ Gubbio (loan)	4	(0)
2017	→ Racing Roma (loan)	7	(0)
2017–2018	Sicula Leonzio	17	(0)
- * Club domestic league appearances and goals as of 29 July 2018

Gianluca Pollace (born 25 December 1995) is an Italian football player.

== Club career ==
He made his Serie B debut for Salernitana on 2 October 2015 in a game against Crotone.
