= Matteo Bachini =

Italian footballer

Personal information
- Date of birth: 24 May 1995 (age 31)
- Place of birth: Pontedera, Italy
- Height: 1.88 m (6 ft 2 in)
- Position: Centre-back

Team information
- Current team: Livorno
- Number: 4

Youth career
- Empoli

Senior career*
Years	Team	Apps	(Gls)
2014–2015	Empoli	0	(0)
2014–2015	→ Lucchese (loan)	1	(0)
2015–2017	Tuttocuoio	40	(1)
2017–2018	Stabia	28	(2)
2018–2019	Spezia	0	(0)
2019	→ Piacenza (loan)	2	(0)
2019–2020	Arzignano	14	(0)
2020	Sicula Leonzio	9	(0)
2020–2021	Vibonese	30	(0)
2021–2023	Lucchese	52	(0)
2023–2024	Juve Stabia	35	(0)
2024–2025	SPAL	1	(0)
2025–2026	Potenza	25	(0)
2026	Casarano	13	(0)
2026–	Livorno	2	(0)
- * Club domestic league appearances and goals as of 29 August 2026

Matteo Bachini (born 24 May 1995) is an Italian professional footballer who plays as a centre-back for Serie C Group B club Livorno.

== Club career ==
Born in Pontedera, Bachini started his career in Empoli youth sector, and was promoted to the first team for the 2014–15 season. He was loaned to Serie C club Lucchese, and he made his professional debut on 14 September 2014 against Savona.

He left Empoli on 2 February 2015, and signed with Tuttocuoio on Serie C.

On 6 July 2017, he joined to Juve Stabia.

The next year, on 13 September 2018 he signed with Spezia. At the middle of the season, on 8 January 2019 he was loaned to Piacenza.

On 3 September 2020, he joined to Vibonese.

In 2021, he signed with Lucchese.

On 26 July 2023, Bachini signed a two-year contract to return to Juve Stabia.

On 7 August 2024, Bachini moved to SPAL on a two-season deal.
