= Nicolò Fazzi =

Italian footballer

Personal information
- Date of birth: 2 March 1995 (age 31)
- Place of birth: Borgo a Mozzano, Italy
- Height: 1.83 m (6 ft 0 in)
- Positions: Midfielder; left back

Team information
- Current team: Gubbio
- Number: 17

Youth career
- Fiorentina

Senior career*
Years	Team	Apps	(Gls)
2013–2016	Fiorentina	0	(0)
2014–2015	→ Perugia (loan)	30	(1)
2015	→ Virtus Entella (loan)	12	(0)
2016	→ Crotone (loan)	2	(0)
2016	Crotone	1	(0)
2017–2019	Atalanta	0	(0)
2017	→ Perugia (loan)	8	(0)
2017–2018	→ Cesena (loan)	33	(1)
2018–2019	→ Livorno (loan)	17	(0)
2019–2021	Padova	29	(1)
2021	Sambenedettese	19	(1)
2021–2023	Messina	39	(1)
2023	Mantova	11	(0)
2024–2025	Lucchese	28	(0)
2025	Ternana	5	(0)
2025–	Gubbio	29	(0)

International career^{‡}
2011	Italy U16	2	(0)
2011–2012	Italy U17	9	(0)
2012–2013	Italy U18	8	(0)
2014–2015	Italy U20	2	(0)
2015	Italy U21	1	(0)
- * Club domestic league appearances and goals as of 30 April 2026 ‡ National team caps and goals as of 12 August 2015

Nicolò Fazzi (born 2 March 1995) is an Italian footballer who plays as a midfielder or left back for Serie C Group B club Gubbio.

== Club career ==
On 25 January 2016 he moved on loan to Crotone.

On 26 January 2021 he signed a 1.5-year contract with Sambenedettese.

On 2 September 2021 he moved to Messina on a two-year deal.

On 26 January 2023, Fazzi signed with Mantova.

On 5 January 2024, Fazzi signed with his hometown team Lucchese.

== International career ==
Fazzi was a youth international for Italy.

On 12 August 2015, he played a friendly match for Italy U21 against Hungary U21.
