= Giuseppe Fornito =

Italian footballer

Personal information
- Date of birth: 6 September 1994 (age 32)
- Place of birth: Trebisacce, Italy
- Height: 1.75 m (5 ft 9 in)
- Position: Central midfielder

Team information
- Current team: Palmese

Youth career
- 2008–2013: Napoli

Senior career*
Years	Team	Apps	(Gls)
2012–2015	Napoli	0	(0)
2013–2014	→ Pescara (loan)	2	(0)
2014–2015	→ Cosenza (loan)	29	(1)
2015–2016	Rimini	0	(0)
2015–2016	→ Messina (loan)	31	(2)
2016–2017	Trapani	0	(0)
2016–2017	→ Catania (loan)	23	(1)
2017–2020	Catania	13	(2)
2018–2019	→ Paganese (loan)	16	(0)
2020	Rende	9	(0)
2020–2021	Savoia	18	(1)
2021	Giugliano	8	(1)
2021–2023	Gelbison	46	(6)
2023–2024	Virtus Francavilla	11	(1)
2024	→ Pro Sesto (loan)	6	(2)
2024–2026	Cavese	22	(0)
2026–	Palmese	0	(0)

International career
2009–2010	Italy U16	3	(1)
2009–2011	Italy U17	8	(0)
2011	Italy U19	3	(1)
- * Club domestic league appearances and goals as of 26 April 2026

Giuseppe Fornito (born 6 September 1994) is an Italian professional footballer who plays as a central midfielder for Serie D club Palmese.

== Club career ==
=== Napoli ===
Coming from the youth ranks of Napoli, he was called to the first team for a match in the Europa League against PSV Eindhoven on December 6, 2012.

=== Pescara ===
In July 2013 Giuseppe Fornito went on loan to Pescara becoming the second Napoli player in two years to play for the club on loan after the success of Lorenzo Insigne while he was playing there on a loan spell.

=== Catania ===
On 31 August 2017, he joined Catania outright and was given the number 18 shirt.

=== Rende ===
On 7 January 2020 he signed with Rende.

=== Serie D ===
On 17 September 2020 he moved to Savoia.

=== Virtus Francavilla ===
On 18 July 2023, Fornito joined Virtus Francavilla. On 1 February 2024, Fornito was loaned by Pro Sesto.

=== Cavese ===
On 14 July 2024, Fornito signed with Cavese.

== National team ==
Giuseppe Fornito has played for the Italy U16, Italy U17 and Italy U19 teams.
