= Simone Della Latta =

Italian footballer

Personal information
- Date of birth: 7 March 1993 (age 33)
- Place of birth: Viareggio, Italy
- Height: 1.86 m (6 ft 1 in)
- Position: Midfielder

Team information
- Current team: Pistoiese
- Number: 15

Youth career
- Empoli

Senior career*
Years	Team	Apps	(Gls)
2012–2014	Empoli	0	(0)
2012–2013	→ Gavorrano (loan)	33	(2)
2013–2014	→ Viareggio (loan)	24	(0)
2014–2015	Pontedera	17	(2)
2015	Grosseto	14	(0)
2015–2017	Pontedera	51	(5)
2017	Carpi	0	(0)
2017	→ Pontedera (loan)	15	(2)
2017–2020	Piacenza	86	(9)
2020–2022	Padova	73	(16)
2022–2024	Carrarese	68	(5)
2024–2025	Vicenza	33	(3)
2025–2026	Grosseto	15	(1)
2026–	Pistoiese	8	(1)
- * Club domestic league appearances and goals as of 28 February 2026

Simone Della Latta (born 7 March 1993) is an Italian professional footballer who plays as a midfielder for Serie D club Pistoiese.

== Club career ==
On 12 August 2020, he joined Serie C club Padova.

On 2 August 2022, Della Latta moved to Carrarese on a three-year contract.

On 30 August 2024, Della Latta signed a one-season contract with Vicenza.
