= Marco Rosafio =

Italian footballer

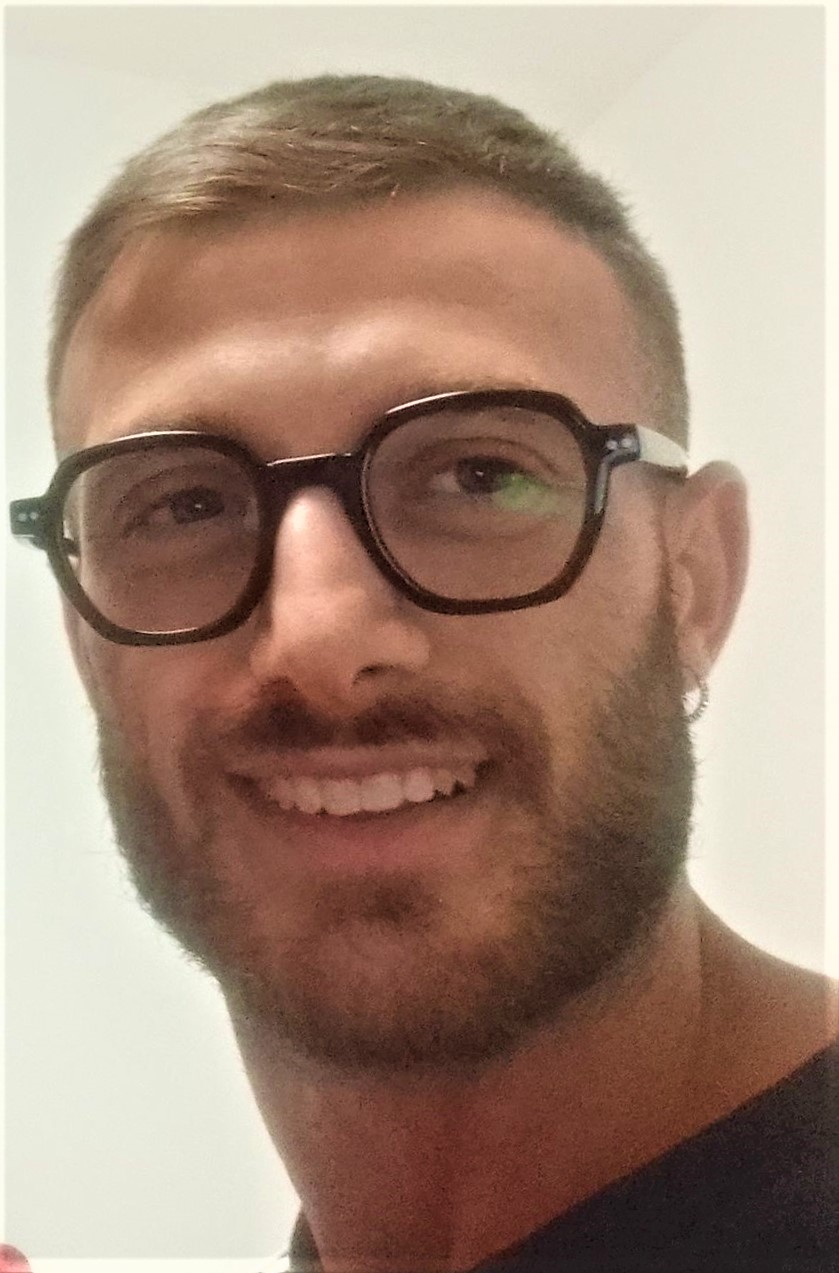

Personal information
- Date of birth: 19 March 1994 (age 32)
- Place of birth: Chur, Switzerland
- Height: 1.78 m (5 ft 10 in)
- Position: Midfielder

Team information
- Current team: Team Altamura
- Number: 7

Youth career
- Salignano
- –2013: Lecce

Senior career*
Years	Team	Apps	(Gls)
2012–2016	Lecce	6	(0)
2013–2014	→ Viareggio (loan)	26	(4)
2015	→ Forlì (loan)	18	(1)
2015–2016	→ Monopoli (loan)	20	(1)
2016–2017	Juve Stabia	11	(2)
2017–2018	ACR Messina	31	(12)
2018–2019	Cavese	30	(6)
2019–2021	Cittadella	50	(2)
2021–2023	Reggiana	59	(8)
2023–2024	SPAL	11	(1)
2024	→ Messina (loan)	16	(2)
2024–2025	Potenza	28	(5)
2025–	Team Altamura	27	(5)
- * Club domestic league appearances and goals as of 1 May 2026

Marco Rosafio (born 19 March 1994) is an Italian professional footballer who plays as a midfielder for Serie C Group C club Team Altamura. He also holds Swiss citizenship.

== Career ==
Rosafio spent the first seven seasons of his senior career in the lower Italian divisions, mostly Serie C.

On 12 July 2019, he signed for Serie B club Cittadella.

Rosafio made his Serie B debut for Cittadella on 28 September 2019, in a game against Juve Stabia, coming off the bench to replace Andrea Bussaglia in the 82nd minute.

On 3 August 2021, he signed a two-year contract with Reggiana.

On 13 August 2023, Rosafio signed a two-year contract with SPAL.

On 28 August 2024, he moved to Potenza, on a one-season contract.
