= Fabrizio Lasagna =

Italian footballer

Personal information
- Date of birth: 19 January 1988 (age 38)
- Place of birth: Palermo, Italy
- Position: Forward

Team information
- Current team: Avellino

Senior career*
Years	Team	Apps	(Gls)
2007–2008	Vibonese	17	(1)
2008–2010	Paganese	50	(5)
2010–2011	Milazzo	8	(2)
2011–2013	Avellino	21	(3)
- * Club domestic league appearances and goals as of 13 november 2010

Fabrizio Lasagna (born 26 June 1988) is an Italian professional footballer who plays as a forward.

On 14 July 2011, he joined Avellino in a definitive deal.

== Caps on Italian Series ==
Serie C1: 50 caps, 5 goal

Serie C2: 24 caps, 3 goal

Total: 74 caps, 8 goal
