= Lorenzo Musto =

Italian footballer

Personal information
- Date of birth: 22 January 1996 (age 30)
- Place of birth: Rome, Italy
- Height: 1.83 m (6 ft 0 in)
- Position: Forward

Youth career
- –2006: Atletico 2000
- 2006–2014: Roma
- 2014–2015: Perugia

Senior career*
Years	Team	Apps	(Gls)
2015–2016	Torres	29	(16)
2016–2018	Bologna	0	(0)
2016–2017	→ Gubbio (loan)	12	(1)
2017	→ Lumezzane (loan)	5	(0)
2017	→ Renate (loan)	9	(0)
2018	→ Arzachena (loan)	9	(1)
2018–2019	Chiasso	0	(0)
- * Club domestic league appearances and goals as of 20:50, 11 August 2019 (UTC)

Lorenzo Musto (born 22 January 1996) is an Italian football player. He plays in Serie D club.

== Club career ==
He made his Serie C debut for Gubbio on 27 August 2016 in a game against Pordenone. On 31 January 2018, he joins Arzachena on loan.

In June 2019, Musto joined Serie D club GS Arconatese.
