= Luca Forte (footballer) =

Italian footballer

Personal information
- Date of birth: 28 July 1994 (age 32)
- Place of birth: Trieste, Italy
- Height: 1.70 m (5 ft 7 in)
- Position: Forward

Team information
- Current team: San Luigi

Youth career
- –2012: Triestina

Senior career*
Years	Team	Apps	(Gls)
2012–2015	Varese	48	(5)
2015–2020	Pescara	7	(1)
2016	→ Pro Vercelli (loan)	1	(0)
2016–2017	→ Teramo (loan)	8	(0)
2017	→ Carpi (loan)	1	(0)
2018	→ Monza (loan)	1	(0)
2020–2021	Siena	8	(2)
2021–2022	Correggese	33	(8)
2022–2023	Lumezzane	23	(6)
2023–2025	Bassano	42	(8)
2025–	San Luigi	6	(4)

International career
2013–2014	Italy U-20	4	(1)
- * Club domestic league appearances and goals as of 22 February 2026

Luca Forte (born 28 July 1994) is an Italian footballer who plays for Serie D club San Luigi.

== Club career ==
He made his professional debut in the Serie B for Varese on 13 May 2013 in a game against Crotone.
