= Davide Voltan =

Italian footballer (born 1995)

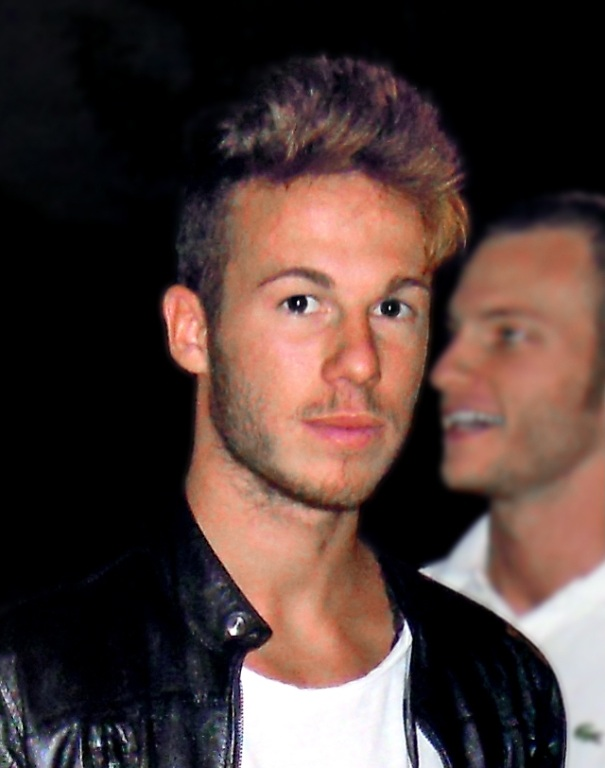

Personal information
- Date of birth: 15 April 1995 (age 31)
- Place of birth: Padua, Italy
- Height: 1.79 m (5 ft 10 in)
- Position: Attacking midfielder

Youth career
- Padova

Senior career*
Years	Team	Apps	(Gls)
2012–2014	Padova	4	(0)
2014–2016	Crotone	0	(0)
2015–2016	→ Bassano Virtus (loan)	10	(1)
2016–2018	Genoa	0	(0)
2016–2017	→ Ancona (loan)	21	(0)
2017–2018	→ FeralpiSalò (loan)	27	(3)
2019–2020	Vis Pesaro	39	(6)
2020–2021	Reggiana	12	(0)
2021	→ Südtirol (loan)	17	(6)
2021–2023	Südtirol	26	(6)
2023	→ FeralpiSalò (loan)	13	(1)
2023–2024	FeralpiSalò	1	(0)
2024–2025	Cittadella	9	(0)
2025–2026	Lecco	15	(0)

International career^{‡}
2013	Italy U18	1	(0)
2013	Italy U19	4	(0)
- * Club domestic league appearances and goals as of 29 April 2026 ‡ National team caps and goals as of 13 November 2013

Davide Voltan (born 15 April 1995) is an Italian footballer who plays as an attacking midfielder.

== Career ==
On 31 August 2017, he joined to FeralpiSalò on loan.

On 11 January 2019, he signed a 2.5-year contract with Serie C club Vis Pesaro.

On 2 September 2020, he signed a three-year contract with Reggiana. On 19 January 2021, he was loaned to Südtirol.

On 7 July 2021, he moved to Südtirol on a permanent basis and signed a three-year contract.

On 3 January 2023, he returned to FeralpiSalò on loan with an obligation to buy.

On 30 August 2024, Voltan signed with Cittadella in Serie B.
