= Alessandro Santopadre =

Italian footballer (born 1998)

Personal information
- Date of birth: 4 October 1998 (age 28)
- Place of birth: Rome, Italy
- Height: 1.85 m (6 ft 1 in)
- Position: Goalkeeper

Youth career
- 2015–2017: Perugia

Senior career*
Years	Team	Apps	(Gls)
2015–2017	Perugia	0	(0)
2017–2021	Atalanta	0	(0)
2017–2018	→ Perugia (loan)	0	(0)
2018–2019	→ Paganese (loan)	21	(0)
2019–2020	→ Rimini (loan)	0	(0)
2020–2021	→ Potenza (loan)	0	(0)
2021–2022	Imolese	10	(0)
- * Club domestic league appearances and goals as of 23 April 2022

Alessandro Santopadre (born 4 October 1998) is an Italian football player who plays as a goalkeeper.

== Club career ==
=== Perugia ===
He started playing for Perugia Under-19 squad in the 2015–16 season and made occasional bench appearances as a back-up goalkeeper for the senior squad.

=== Atalanta ===
==== Loan back to Perugia ====
On 24 January 2017, he signed with Atalanta, who immediately loaned him back to Perugia until June 2018. He became the primary backup goalkeeper for Perugia in the 2017–18 Serie B season, but did not appear on the field.

==== Loan to Paganese ====
For the 2018–19 season, he joined Paganese on loan.

He made his Serie C debut for Paganese on 17 November 2018 in a game against Cavese.

==== Loans to Rimini and Potenza ====
On 26 July 2019 he moved to Serie C club Rimini on loan. On 31 January 2020 he joined Potenza on loan. The loan to Potenza was extended for the 2020–21 season.

=== Imolese ===
On 27 August 2021, he signed a one-year deal with Imolese.
