= Scandicci Calcio =

Italian football club

Scandicci
- Full name: Club Sportivo Scandicci
- Founded: 1908
- Ground: Stadio Comunale Turri, Scandicci, Italy
- Capacity: 1,800
- Chairman: Fabio Rorandelli
- Manager: Claudio Davitti
- League: Serie D/E
- 2024–25: 1st
Home colours	Away colours

Scandicci Calcio is an Italian association football club located in Scandicci, Tuscany. It currently plays in Serie D.

== History ==
The club was founded in 1908.

== Colors and badge ==
The team's colours are blue and white.
